= The Finest Moments =

Compilation album by Sandi Patti
- Released: October 23, 1989
- Recorded: 1979–1989
- Studio: "Exalt The Name" recorded at Nightgale Studios, Nashville, Tennessee; Javalina Recording Studios, Nashville, Tennessee; Pinebrook Recording Studios, Alexandria, Indiana
- Genre: CCM, inspirational music, gospel
- Length: 60:55
- Label: Word
- Producer: Greg Nelson, Sandi Patti, David T. Clydesdale, Neal Joseph

Sandi Patti chronology
Sandi Patti and the Friendship Company (1989)	The Finest Moments (1989)	Another Time...Another Place (1990)

Professional ratings
Review scores
Source	Rating
AllMusic	4.5/5 stars

The Finest Moments is a compilation album by Christian singer Sandi Patti, released in 1989 on Word Records. Although not your typical "best of" album, this collection of songs consists of some live highlights from her 1983 live album More Than Wonderful, some choice songs from the first ten years of her recording career from 1979's Sandi's Song to 1986's Morning Like This and one brand new track "Exalt The Name" recorded specifically for this collection co-written by CCM singer-songwriter Margaret Becker. The album peaked at No. 2 on the Billboard Top Christian Albums chart and was certified Gold by the RIAA in October 1993.

== Track listing ==
No.	Title	Writer(s)	Original album	Length
1.	"How Majestic Is Your Name" (*)	Michael W. Smith	More Than Wonderful	2:36
2.	"Exalt the Name"	Margaret Becker, Mark Hauth	New recording	3:15
3.	"In the Name of the Lord"	Sandi Patti, Gloria Gaither, Phil McHugh	Morning Like This	5:00
4.	"The Day He Wore My Crown" (***)	Phil Johnson	Sandi's Song	5:07
5.	"Pour On the Power"	Dwight Liles, Mark Gersmehl, Niles Borop	Songs from the Heart	3:10
6.	"They Could Not" (**)	Ron Harris, Claire Cloninger	Lift Up the Lord	5:36
7.	"More Than Wonderful" (with Larnelle Harris *)	Lanny Wolfe	More Than Wonderful	5:39
8.	"The Home of the Lord" (with Russ Taff ***)	David Diggs, Robert Mason, Jonathan Michaels	Love Overflowing	3:17
9.	"How Great Thou Art"	Stuart K. Hine	Hymns Just for You	5:23
10.	"Upon This Rock" (*)	Gloria Gaither, Dony McGuire	More Than Wonderful	4:58
11.	"O Magnify the Lord" (*)	Dick and Melodie Tunney	Christmas: The Gift Goes On	2:02
12.	"Via Dolorosa"	Billy Sprague, Niles Borop	Songs from the Heart	4:32
13.	"We Shall Behold Him" (***)	Dottie Rambo	Love Overflowing	5:48
14.	"The Stage Is Bare"	Sandi Patti, Gloria Gaither, Bill Gaither, Bill George	Songs from the Heart	4:19

All tracks produced by Greg Nelson and Sandi Patti except the following tracks:

- Co-produced by David T. Clydesdale (*)
- Produced by Greg Nelson (**)
- Produced by Neal Joseph (***)

== Charts ==
Chart (1990)	Peak position
US Top Christian Albums (Billboard)	2

=== Radio singles ===
Year	Singles	Peak positions
Year	Singles	CCM AC
1989-90	"Exalt The Name"	2

== Certifications and sales ==
Region	Certification	Certified units/sales
United States (RIAA)	Gold	500,000^{^}
^{^} Shipments figures based on certification alone.
