= Via Dolorosa: Songs of Redemption =

Compilation album by Sandi Patty
- Released: 2008
- Genre: CCM
- Length: 50:34
- Labels: Word, Curb
- Producer: Greg Nelson

Sandi Patty chronology
Gospel Greats (2008)	Via Dolorosa: Songs of Redemption (2008)

Via Dolorosa: Songs of Redemption is an Easter compilation of previously released songs by Sandi Patty in which these tracks deals with themes of the crucifixion and resurrection of Jesus Christ.

== Track listing ==
No.	Title	Writer(s)	Original Album	Length
1.	"Via Dolorosa"	Niles Borop; Billy Sprague	Songs From the Heart	4:37
2.	"In the Name of the Lord"	Sandi Patty; Phil McHugh; Gloria Gaither	Morning Like This	5:02
3.	"The Day He Wore My Crown"	Phil Johnson	Sandi's Song	5:16
4.	"Where the Nails Were"	Gary Driskell; Marty Hennis	Find It on the Wings	4:57
5.	"The Old Rugged Cross"	George Bennard	Hymns Just for You	3:35
6.	"O Calvary's Lamb"	Chaz Bosarge; Tommy Greer; Bill George	Another Time...Another Place	5:01
7.	"They Could Not"	Ron Harris; Claire Cloninger	Lift Up the Lord	5:36
8.	"Was It a Morning Like This"	Jim Croegaert	Morning Like This	3:23
9.	"Glorious Morning"	Gary McSpadden; Lari Goss; Linda Dooley	Songs From the Heart	3:32
10.	"Who Will Call Him King of Kings?"	Sandi Patty; Greg Nelson; Bob Farrell	Another Time...Another Place	5:35
11.	"I Will Sing the Wondrous Story"	Frances Rowley; Rick Vale	Artist of My Soul	4:00
Total length:				50:34
