= More Than Wonderful =

Live album by Sandi Patti
- Released: 1983
- Venue: First Assembly of God, Lakeland, Florida; Great Circle Sound, Nashville, Tennessee
- Genre: CCM, inspirational music, gospel
- Length: 59:17
- Label: Impact
- Producer: David T. Clydesdale, Greg Nelson, Sandi Patti

Sandi Patti chronology
Lift Up the Lord (1982)	More Than Wonderful (1983)	Christmas: The Gift Goes On (1983)

Professional ratings
Review scores
Source	Rating
AllMusic	2/5 stars

More Than Wonderful is a live album by gospel singer Sandi Patti issued in 1983 on Impact Records. The album reached No. 2 on the Billboard Top Christian Albums chart. The track "More Than Wonderful" would win many accolades including a Grammy Award for Best Gospel Performance by a Duo or Group at the 26th Grammy Awards, winning both Patti and Larnelle Harris their first Grammys together and a Dove Award for Song of the Year for its writer Lanny Wolfe and the album would win Inspirational Album of the Year and Patti won both Female Vocalist and Artist of the Year at the 15th GMA Dove Awards in 1984. In 1985, the track "Upon This Rock" wins Song of the Year, given to its writers Gloria Gaither and Dony McGuire at the 16th GMA Dove Awards. The album was certified Gold in 1985 and Platinum in 1990 by the Recording Industry Association of America. In 1990, More Than Wonderful was re-issued on Word Records.

== Track listing ==
No.	Title	Writer(s)	Length
1.	"It's Your Song Lord"	Billy Smiley, Claire Cloninger, Sandi Patti Helvering	2:55
2.	"How Majestic Is Your Name"	Michael W. Smith	2:52
3.	"In His Love"	Dana Key, Eddie DeGarmo	3:06
4.	"Jesus Loves Me" (Medley)	Sandi Patti Helvering	13:53
5.	"Upon This Rock"	Dony McGuire, Gloria Gaither	5:32
6.	"Because of Who You Are"	Billy Smiley, Bob Farrell	4:41
7.	"My God Is Real (Yes, God Is Real)"	Kenneth Morris	2:58
8.	"More Than Wonderful" (featuring Larnelle Harris)	Lanny Wolfe	6:07
9.	"When the Time Comes"	David Kavich	2:49
10.	"We Shall Behold Him"	Dottie Rambo	6:58

== Charts ==
Chart (1983)	Peak position
US Top Contemporary Christian Albums	2

=== Radio singles ===
Year	Single	Peak position
Year	Single	CCM AC
1983	"More Than Wonderful" (with Larnelle Harris)	2
1983	"Upon This Rock"	2

== Certifications and sales ==
Region	Certification	Certified units/sales
United States (RIAA)	Platinum	1,000,000^{^}
^{^} Shipments figures based on certification alone.

== Accolades ==
GMA Dove Awards

- 1984 Female Vocalist of the Year
- 1984 Artist of the Year

Year	Winner	Category
1984	More Than Wonderful	Inspirational Album of the Year

Grammy Awards

Year	Winner	Category
1984	"More Than Wonderful" (with Larnelle Harris)	Best Gospel Performance by a Duo or Group
