= List of awards and nominations received by Amy Grant =

Amy Grant awards and nominations
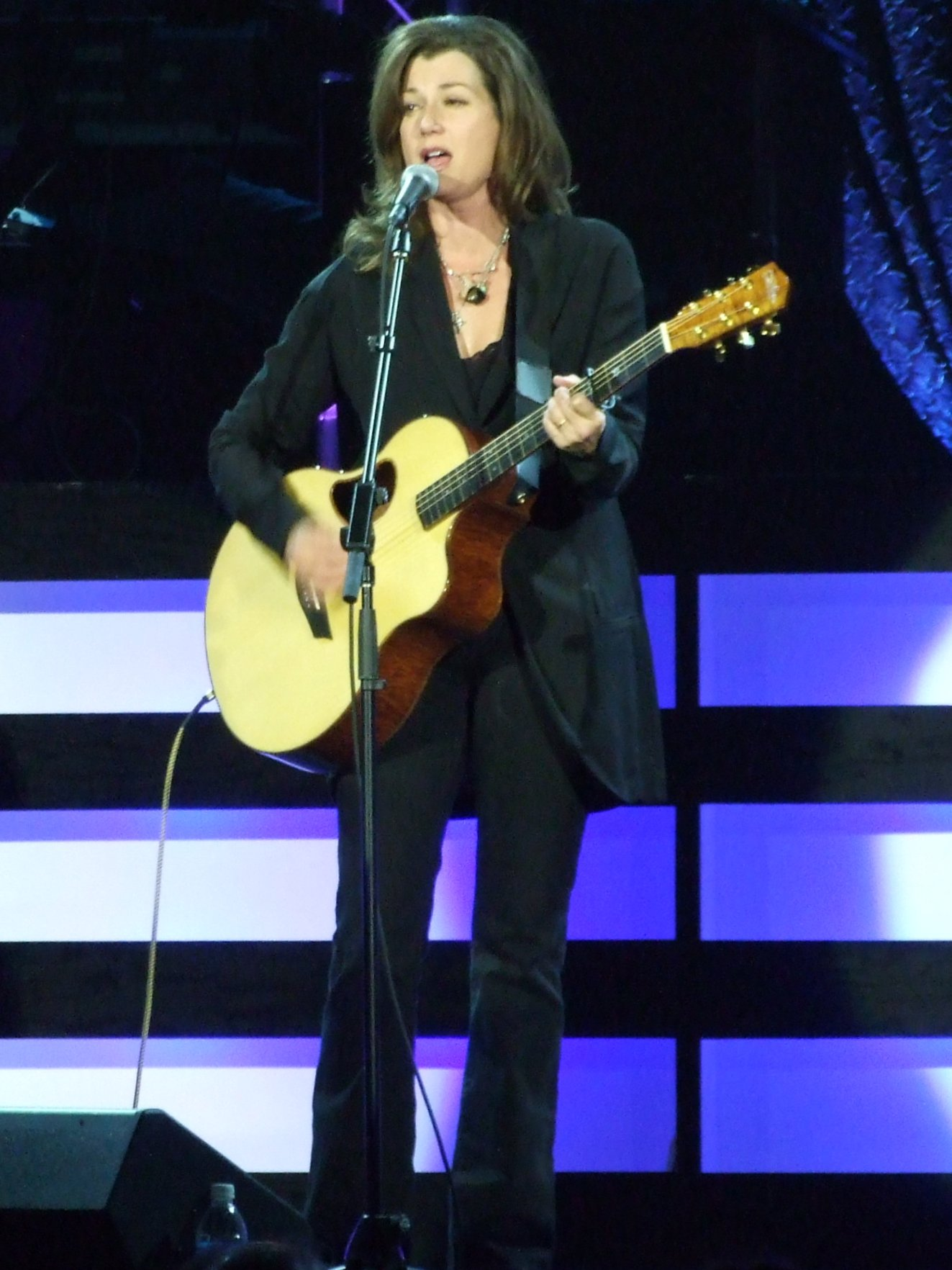
- Grant performing during the Lead Me On anniversary tour
Awards and nominations
Award	Wins	Nominations
American Music Awards	0	1
GMA Dove Awards	22	22
Grammy Awards	6	19
MTV Video Music Awards	0	1

Totals (Note: Certain award groups do not simply award one winner. They acknowledge several different recipients, have runners-up, and have third place. Since this is a specific recognition and is different from losing an award, runner-up mentions are considered wins in this award tally. For simplification and to avoid errors, each award in this list has been presumed to have had a prior nomination.)
- Wins: 28
- Nominations: 36

Amy Grant is an American singer-songwriter, musician, author, media personality and actress, best known for her Christian music. She has been referred to as "The Queen of Christian Pop". As of 2009, Grant remains the best-selling contemporary Christian music singer ever, having sold over 30 million units worldwide.

Grant made her debut as a teenager, and gained fame in Christian music during the 1980s with such hits as "Father's Eyes," "El Shaddai", and "Angels". In 1986, she scored her first number one charting Billboard Hot 100 hit song in a duet with Peter Cetera "The Next Time I Fall". During the 1980s and 1990s, she became one of the first gospel artists to cross over into mainstream pop on the heels of her successful albums Unguarded and Heart in Motion, the latter of which included the number-one single "Baby Baby."

Grant has won six Grammy Awards, 22 Gospel Music Association Dove Awards, and had the first Christian album ever to go Platinum. Heart in Motion is her highest selling album, with over five million copies sold in the United States alone. She was honored with a star on Hollywood Walk of Fame in 2005 for her contributions to the entertainment industry.

== Academy of Achievement ==
The American Academy of Achievement is a nonprofit organization that seeks to educate and inspire youth. Amy Grant has received an award in 1996.

Year	Nominee / work	Award	Result
1996	Amy Grant	Golden Plate Award	Won

== American Music Awards ==
The American Music Awards are awarded annually for outstanding achievements in the record industry in the United States. Amy Grant has received only one nomination.

Year	Nominee / work	Award	Result
1993	Amy Grant	Favorite Pop/Rock Female Artist	Nominated

== American Society of Composers, Authors and Publishers ==
The American Society of Composers, Authors and Publishers is an American not-for-profit performance-rights organization (PRO) that protects its members' musical copyrights by monitoring public performances of their music, whether via a broadcast or live performance, and compensating them accordingly. Grant has received an award in 1996.

Year	Nominee / work	Award	Result
1996	Amy Grant	Voice of America	Won

== Saint John's University ==
The College of Saint Benedict and Saint John's University are partnered liberal arts colleges respectively located in St. Joseph and Collegeville, Minnesota, USA. Grant has received one award.

Year	Nominee / work	Award	Result
1994	Amy Grant	Pax Christi Award	Won

== GMA Dove Awards ==
The GMA Dove Awards are presented annually by the Gospel Music Association for outstanding achievements in the Christian music industry. According to the awards' official site, Grant has received twenty-two awards, though her official site claims twenty-six awards.

Year	Nominee / work	Award	Result
1983	Amy Grant	Artist of the Year	Won
1983	Age to Age	Pop/Contemporary Album of the Year	Won
1983	Age to Age	Recorded Music Packaging of the Year	Won
1984	A Christmas Album	Recorded Music Packaging of the Year	Won
1985	Straight Ahead	Pop/Contemporary Album of the Year	Won
1986	Amy Grant	Artist of the Year	Won
1986	Unguarded	Recorded Music Packaging of the Year	Won
1988	"Stay for Awhile"	Short Form Music Video of the Year	Won
1989	Amy Grant	Artist of the Year	Won
1989	Lead Me On	Pop/Contemporary Album of the Year	Won
1989	"Lead Me On"	Short Form Music Video of the Year	Won
1990	"'Tis So Sweet to Trust in Jesus"	Country Recorded Song of the Year	Won
1992	"Place in this World"	Song of the Year	Won
1992	Amy Grant	Artist of the Year	Won
1994	Songs from the Loft	Praise and Worship Album of the Year	Won
1996	My Utmost for His Highest	Special Event Album of the Year	Won
1998	Behind the Eyes	Pop/Contemporary Album of the Year	Won
2000	Streams	Special Event Album of the Year	Won
2003	Legacy... Hymns and Faith	Inspirational Album of the Year	Won
2003	"The River's Gonna Keep on Rolling"	Country Recorded Song of the Year	Won
2004	Simple Things	Pop/Contemporary Album of the Year	Nominated
2006	Rock of Ages... Hymns and Faith	Inspirational Album of the Year	Won
2007	Time Again… Live	Long Form Music Video of the Year	Won
2011	"Better Than A Hallelujah"	Short Form Music Video of the Year	Nominated

== Grammy Awards ==
The Grammy Awards are awarded annually by the National Academy of Recording Arts and Sciences of the United States for outstanding achievements in the music industry. Often considered the highest music honor, the awards were established in 1958. Amy Grant has won six awards of nineteen nominations. As composer of Better Than a Hallelujah, a gospel song Grant previously wrote and recorded, she was not eligible for an award if Sarah Hart & Chapin Hartford's nominated cover had won in 2011. A performance of a song Amy Grant wrote was nominated but it was not her nomination.

Year	Nominee / work	Award	Result
1979	My Father's Eyes	Best Gospel Performance, Contemporary or Inspirational	Nominated
1980	Never Alone	Best Gospel Performance, Contemporary or Inspirational	Nominated
1981	Amy Grant in Concert	Best Gospel Performance, Contemporary or Inspirational	Nominated
1982	Age to Age	Best Gospel Performance, Contemporary	Won
1983	Ageless Medley	Best Gospel Vocal Performance, Female	Won
1984	"Angels"	Best Gospel Vocal Performance, Female	Won
1985	Unguarded	Best Gospel Vocal Performance, Female	Won
1985	"I Could Never Say Goodbye"	Best Gospel Vocal Performance by a Duo or Group, Choir or Chorus	Nominated
1987	"The Next Time I Fall"	Best Pop Performance by a Duo or Group with Vocal	Nominated
1988	Lead Me On	Best Gospel Vocal Performance, Female	Won
1989	"'Tis So Sweet to Trust in Jesus"	Best Gospel Vocal Performance, Female	Nominated
1992	Heart in Motion	Album of the Year	Nominated
1992	"Baby Baby"	Song of the Year	Nominated
1992	"Baby Baby"	Record of the Year	Nominated
1992	"Baby Baby"	Best Female Pop Vocal Performance	Nominated
1994	The Creation	Best Spoken Word Album for Children	Nominated
2000	"When I Look Into Your Heart"	Best Country Collaboration with Vocals	Nominated
2005	Rock of Ages... Hymns and Faith	Best Southern, Country or Bluegrass Gospel Album	Won
2011	"Better Than a Hallelujah"	Best Gospel Song	Nominated
2012	"Threaten Me with Heaven"	Best Country Song	Nominated

== MTV Video Music Awards ==
The MTV Video Music Awards are awarded annually by MTV. Grant has received one nomination.

Year	Nominee / work	Award	Result
1991	"Baby Baby"	Best Female Video	Nominated

== Nashville Symphony ==
The Nashville Symphony awarded Grant with Harmony Award in 1994.

Year	Nominee / work	Award	Result
1994	Amy Grant	Harmony Award	Won

== United States Junior Chamber ==
The United States Junior Chamber is a leadership training and civic organization for people between the ages of 18 and 41. Areas of emphasis are business development, management skills, individual training, community service, and international connections. Grant has received one award.

Year	Nominee / work	Award	Result
1992	Amy Grant	Young Tennessean of the Year	Won
