= 15th GMA Dove Awards =

1984 US music awards ceremony

- Date: 1984
- Location: Nashville, Tennessee

The 15th Annual GMA Dove Awards were held on 1984 recognizing accomplishments of musicians for the year 1983. The show was held in Nashville, Tennessee. This is the first televised award show, broadcast on the Christian Broadcasting Network.

== Award recipients ==
- Song of the Year
  - "More Than Wonderful"; Lanny Wolfe; Lanny Wolfe Music (ASCAP)
- Songwriter of the Year
  - Lanny Wolfe
- Male Vocalist of the Year
  - Russ Taff
- Female Vocalist of the Year
  - Sandi Patti
- Group of the Year
  - No award given in this category
- Artist of the Year
  - Sandi Patti
- Southern Gospel Album of the Year
  - We Shall Behold the King; Rex Nelon Singers; Ken Harding; Canaan Records
- Inspirational Album of the Year
  - More Than Wonderful; Sandi Patti; Greg Nelson, Sandi Patti, David T. Clydesdale; Impact Records
- Pop/Contemporary Album of the Year
  - Side By Side; The Imperials; Keith Thomas, Neal Joseph; DaySpring Records
- Contemporary Gospel Album of the Year
  - Come Together; Bobby Jones and New Life; Tony Brown; Myrrh Records
- Traditional Gospel Album of the Year
  - We Sing Praises; Sandra Crouch; Sandra Crouch; Light Records
- Instrumentalist
  - Phil Driscoll
- Praise and Worship Album of the Year
  - Celebrate The Joy; David T. Clydesdale; Impact
- Children's Music Album of the Year
  - Music Machine II; Tony Salerno, Fletch Wiley, Ron Kreuger; Birdwing
- Musical Album
  - Dreamer; Cam Floria; Christian Artists
- Recorded Music Packaging of the Year
  - Dennis Hill, Michael Borum, Bill Farrell; A Christmas Album; Amy Grant
- Album by a Secular Artist
  - Surrender; Debby Boone; Brown Bannister; Sparrow Records
