= GMA Dove Award for Vocalist of the Year =

Annual US music award

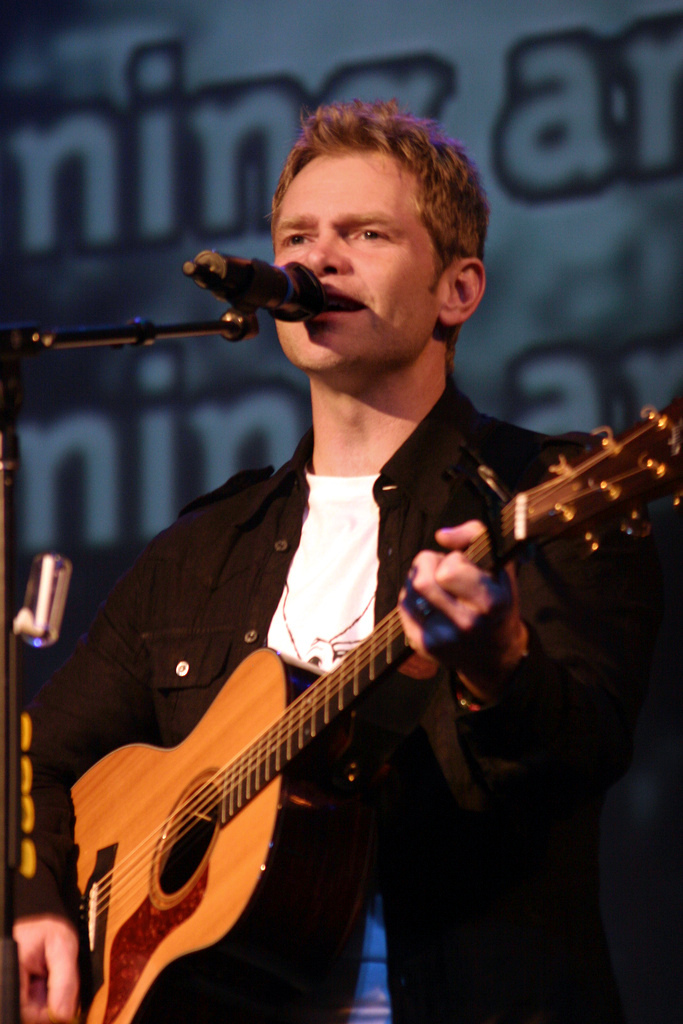
Steven Curtis Chapman won seven Male Vocalist of Years awards between 1990 and 2001.

The Gospel Music Association (GMA) Dove Awards are presented annually by the Gospel Music Association for outstanding achievements in the Christian music industry. The awards for Male and Female Vocalist of the Year Award has been awarded every year that the GMA has given the awards since 1969. Eighteen different men and seventeen different women have won the award in forty-three years. James Blackwood won seven of the first eight (1969–1970, 1972–1975, 1977) Male Vocalist of the Year awards and is tied for the most with Steven Curtis Chapman (1990–1991, 1995, 1997–1998, 2000–2001). Sandi Patty has the most Vocalist of Year awards overall with eleven (1982–1992). Other multiple award winners include Natalie Grant (five), Sue Chenault Dodge (three), Michael English (three), Larnelle Harris (three), Russ Taff (three), Chris Tomlin (three), Twila Paris (three), Francesca Battistelli (two), Jeremy Camp (two), Cynthia Clawson (two), Steve Green (two), Brandon Heath (two), Dallas Holm (two), Nicole C. Mullen (two), Nichole Nordeman (two), Evie (two), Jaci Velasquez (two), and Cece Winans (two). Chapman's seventh and most recent Vocalist of the Year award in 2001 came eleven years after his first in 1990—the longest span between awards. In the awards forty-three year history, only in 1969, 1976, 1996, 1999, 2002, and 2006, did both the male and female award winners win for the first time in the same year. The most recent winners were Jason Crabb and Grant; it was Crabb's first win.

GMA officials rescinded the Dove Awards of 1971 due to solicitation of votes by the James Blackwood family. James Blackwood and Sue Chenault would have won the male and female vocalist of the year awards, respectively. If the awards had not been removed, Blackwood would have had the most male vocalist of the year awards with eight. The only other year in which there were no awards was in 1979 when they were moved from October to April.

== Winners ==
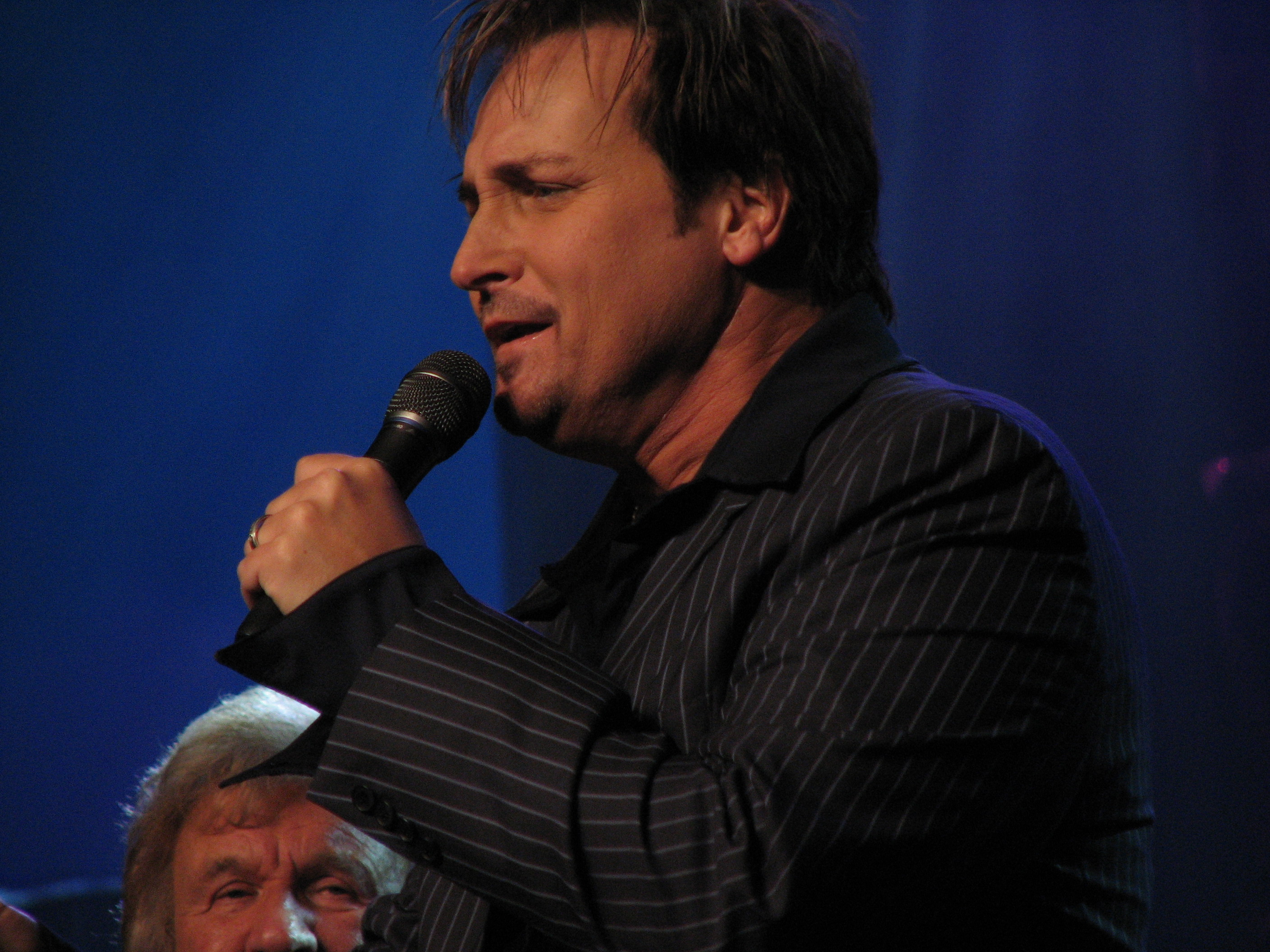
Michael English was Male Vocalist of the Year in 1992, 1993, and 1994.

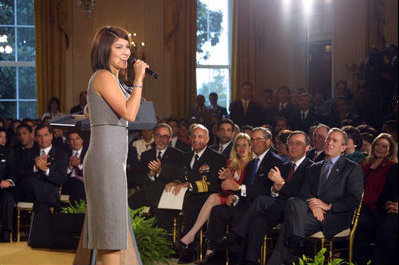
Jaci Velásquez sings at the White House in 2002. She was Female Vocalist of the Year in 1999 and 2000.

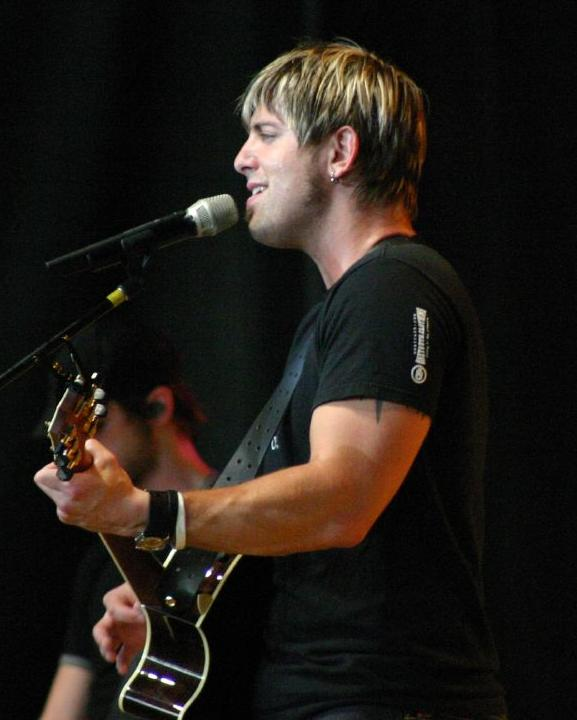
Jeremy Camp performing in 2008. Camp was the Male Vocalist of the Year in 2004 and 2005.

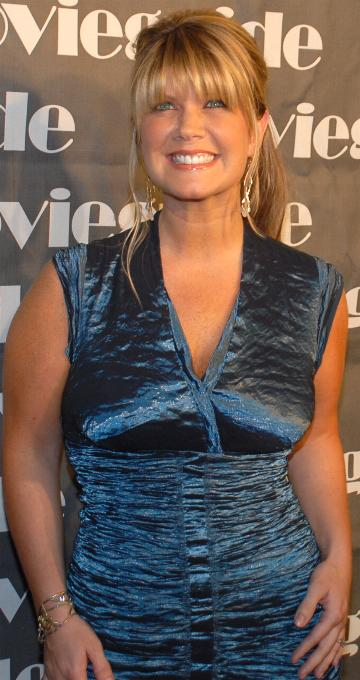
Natalie Grant at the 16th Annual MovieGuide Faith and Values Awards Gala. Grant won four consecutive Female Vocalist of the Year Awards between 2006 and 2009.

Year	Male Vocalist of the Year	Female Vocalist of the Year	Ref
1969	James Blackwood	Vestal Goodman	
1970	James Blackwood	Ann Downing	
1971	No awards	No awards	(Note: Awards were invalidated due to voting irregularities. James Blackwood and Sue Chenault were the original winners.)
1972	James Blackwood	Sue Chenault	
1973	James Blackwood	Sue Chenault	
1974	James Blackwood	Sue Chenault Dodge	
1975	James Blackwood	Jeanne Johnson	
1976	James Blackwood	Joy McGuire	
1977	James Blackwood	Evie Tornquist	
1978	Dallas Holm	Evie Tornquist	
1979	No awards	No awards	(Note: No awards were given in 1979 because the award ceremony was moved from October to April.)
1980	Dallas Holm	Cynthia Clawson	
1981	Russ Taff	Cynthia Clawson	
1982	Russ Taff	Sandi Patty	
1983	Larnelle Harris	Sandi Patty	
1984	Russ Taff	Sandi Patty	
1985	Steve Green	Sandi Patty	
1986	Larnelle Harris	Sandi Patty	
1987	Steve Green	Sandi Patty	
1988	Larnelle Harris	Sandi Patty	
1989	Wayne Watson	Sandi Patty	
1990	Steven Curtis Chapman	Sandi Patty	
1991	Steven Curtis Chapman	Sandi Patty	
1992	Michael English	Sandi Patty	
1993	Michael English	Twila Paris	
1994	Michael English	Twila Paris	
1995	Steven Curtis Chapman	Twila Paris	
1996	Gary Chapman	Cece Winans	
1997	Steven Curtis Chapman	Cece Winans	
1998	Steven Curtis Chapman	Crystal Lewis	
1999	Chris Rice	Jaci Velasquez	
2000	Steven Curtis Chapman	Jaci Velasquez	
2001	Steven Curtis Chapman	Nichole Nordeman	
2002	Mac Powell	Nicole C. Mullen	
2003	Michael W. Smith	Nichole Nordeman	
2004	Jeremy Camp	Stacie Orrico	
2005	Jeremy Camp	Nicole C. Mullen	
2006	Chris Tomlin	Natalie Grant	
2007	Chris Tomlin	Natalie Grant	
2008	Chris Tomlin	Natalie Grant	
2009	Brandon Heath	Natalie Grant	
2010	Brandon Heath	Francesca Battistelli	
2011	Chris August	Francesca Battistelli	
2012	Jason Crabb	Natalie Grant	
