= O Holy Night! =

Studio album by Sandi Patty
- Released: 1996
- Recorded: 1992, 1995
- Studio: Bennett House, Franklin, Tennessee; CTS Studios Limited, Wembley, London, England; Gaither Studios, Alexandria, Indiana; Greg Nelson Music Studio, Nashville, Tennessee; Spotland, Nashville, TN
- Genre: CCM, Christmas music, orchestral music
- Length: 44:22
- Label: Word
- Producer: Greg Nelson, Fred Salem

Sandi Patty chronology
| Find It on the Wings (1994) | O Holy Night! (1996) | An American Songbook (1996) |

Professional ratings
Review scores
| Source | Rating |
|---|---|
| AllMusic | 3/5 stars |

O Holy Night! is a 1996 Christmas album by Christian singer Sandi Patty released on Word Records. It is her sixteenth and second Christmas album (her first since 1983's Christmas: The Gift Goes On) with six tracks produced by Patty's long-time producer Greg Nelson and five songs selected from the 1992 Hallmark Christmas album Celebrate Christmas! produced by Fred Salem with arrangements conducted by David T. Clydesdale featuring the London Symphony Orchestra. The album peaked at number 7 on the Top Christian Albums chart, number 8 on the Top Holiday Albums chart and number 143 on the Top 200 Albums chart on Billboard magazine.

== Track listing ==
| No. | Title | Writer(s) | Length |
|---|---|---|---|
| 1. | "Angels We Have Heard on High" (*) | Traditional | 3:15 |
| 2. | "Carol of the Bells" | Traditional | 3:47 |
| 3. | "(There's No Place Like) Home for the Holidays/I'll Be Home for Christmas" | Robert Allen, Al Stillman/Walter Kent, Kim Gannon, Buck Ram | 6:05 |
| 4. | "White Christmas/Winter Wonderland" | Irving Berlin/Felix Bernard, Richard Bernhard Smith | 4:24 |
| 5. | "O Holy Night" (*) | Adolphe Adam, John Sullivan Dwight | 4:29 |
| 6. | "I Heard the Bells on Christmas Day" | Traditional | 3:10 |
| 7. | "My Favorite Things" | Richard Rodgers, Oscar Hammerstein II | 2:58 |
| 8. | "Silver Bells" (*) | Jay Livingston, Ray Evans | 3:32 |
| 9. | "The Christmas Song" (*) | Mel Tormé, Robert Wells | 3:17 |
| 10. | "Child of Peace" (*) | Bob Farrell | 3:59 |
| 11. | "Star of Bethlehem" | Karla Worley | 5:26 |

Note: (*) - tracks were produced in 1992 by Fred Salem, tracks arranged by David T. Clydesdale. All other tracks produced by Greg Nelson.

== Charts ==
| Chart (1996) | Peak position |
|---|---|
| US Top 200 Albums (Billboard) | 143 |
| US Top Christian Albums (Billboard) | 7 |
| US Top Holiday Albums (Billboard) | 8 |
