= Songs from the Heart (Sandi Patty album) =

Studio album by Sandi Patti
- Released: 1984
- Genre: Contemporary Christian, inspirational music
- Length: 38:58
- Label: Impact
- Producer: Greg Nelson, Sandi Patti

Sandi Patti chronology
Christmas: The Gift Goes On (1983)	Songs from the Heart (1984)	Hymns Just for You (1985)

Professional ratings
Review scores
Source	Rating
AllMusic	3/5 stars

Songs from the Heart is the seventh studio album by Christian gospel singer Sandi Patti, released in 1984 on Impact Records. The album was nominated for Best Gospel Performance, Female at the 27th Annual Grammy Awards and won Inspirational Album at the 16th GMA Dove Awards in 1985. The track "Via Dolorosa" won Song of the Year at the Dove Awards the following year, going to its writers Billy Sprague and Niles Borop. The album peaked at No. 2 on the Billboard Top Christian Albums chart. The album has been certified Gold by the RIAA in 1987. In 1990, Songs from the Heart was re-issued on Word Records.

== Track listing ==
No.	Title	Writer(s)	Length
1.	"Give Him the Glory"	Steven Curtis Chapman, Brent Henderson	2:37
2.	"Sing to the Lord"	Robert Sterling	2:58
3.	"We Will See Him as He Is"	Mark Gersmehl, Scott Douglas	3:42
4.	"Cradle Song"	Mark Gersmehl	2:59
5.	"Wonderful Lord"	Scott Wesley Brown	2:34
6.	"Via Dolorosa"	Billy Sprague, Niles Borop	4:34
7.	"Shine Down"	Billy Smiley, Bob Farrell, Mark Gersmehl	3:29
8.	"Pour On the Power" (guest vocals by First Call)	Dwight Liles, Mark Gersmehl, Niles Borop	3:11
9.	"Glorious Morning"	Gary McSpadden, Lari Goss, Linda Dooley	3:29
10.	"Purest Praise"	Bill George, Scott Wesley Brown, Billy Smiley	2:01
11.	"The Stage Is Bare/I Need Thee Every Hour"	Gloria Gaither, Bill Gaither, Bill George, Sandi Patti/Robert Lowry, Annie Hawks	5:52

== Personnel ==
- Sandi Patti – vocals, rhythm arrangements (1, 2, 4, 5, 7, 8, 10)
- Mitch Humphries – acoustic piano (1, 2, 3, 5, 6, 8, 9, 10), Fender Rhodes (4)
- Shane Keister – synthesizers (1, 2, 3, 5–10), rhythm arrangements (1, 2, 7, 8, 10), acoustic piano (7), synthesizer and track arrangements (7)
- David Huntsinger – acoustic piano (11)
- Jon Goin – guitars (1, 2, 4, 5, 8, 10)
- John Darnall – guitars (3, 6, 9)
- Greg Jennings – guitars (6)
- David Hungate – bass (1, 2, 4, 8)
- Craig Nelson – bass (3, 6, 9)
- Larry Paxton – bass (5, 10)
- Mike Brignardello – bass (7)
- James Stroud – drums (1–6, 8, 9, 10)
- Larrie Londin – drums (7)
- Farrell Morris – percussion (1, 3, 5, 6, 9, 10)
- Billy Wiggins – percussion (3, 6, 9)
- Kim Hutchcroft – brass (1, 8)
- Larry Williams – brass (1, 8)
- Bill Reichenbach Jr. – brass (1, 8)
- Gary Grant – brass (1, 8)
- Jerry Hey – brass (1, 8), brass arrangements (1, 8)
- Hornworks – brass (3)
- Bobby Taylor – oboe (6)
- Greg Nelson – rhythm arrangements (1, 2, 5, 8, 10)

Nashville String Machine (3–7, 9–11)

- Alan Moore – arrangements (2, 4, 10)
- David T. Clydesdale – orchestrations (3, 6, 9), arrangements (3, 6, 9, 11), conductor (3, 6, 9)
- Don Hart – arrangements (4)
- Shane Keister – arrangements (7)
- Greg Nelson – conductor (2, 5, 10, 11)
- Carl Gorodetzky – concertmaster
- Inez Boyle, David Christensen, Roy Christensen, Martha McCrory, Mark Tanner and David Vanderkooi – cello
- Nathan Kahn, Edgar Meyer and Craig Nelson – double bass
- Mary Alice Hopefinger – harp (3, 5, 9)
- John Borg, Virginia Christensen, Connie Collopy, Kathryn Plummer, Gary Vanosdale and Kristin Wilkinson – viola
- George Binkley, Charles Everett, William Fitzpatrick, Rosemary Harris, Larry Harvin, Janet Hazen, Connie Heard, Lee Larrison, Rebecca Lynch, Phyllis Mazza, Ted Madsen, Dennis Molchan, Laura Molyneaux, Pamela Sixfin, Christian Teal and Stephanie Woolf – violin

Backing vocals

- Sandi Patti – arrangements (1, 5, 7, 10)
- Craig Patty – arrangements (1)
- Mike Patty – arrangements (1)
- Alan Moore – arrangements (2, 8)

Singers

- Sandi Patti (1, 2, 3, 5, 7, 8, 9)
- Craig Patty (1, 2, 3, 6–9)
- Mike Patty (1, 3, 6, 9)
- Cozette Byrd (2, 3, 7, 9)
- Bonnie Keen (2, 3, 7, 8, 9)
- Marty McCall (2, 3, 6–9)
- Melodie Tunney (2, 3, 7, 8, 9)
- Lori Brooks (3, 9)
- Jackie Cusic (3, 9)
- Dave Durham (3, 6, 9)
- Rick Gibson (3, 6, 9)
- Steve Green (3, 6, 9)
- Sandie Hall Brooks (3, 8, 9)
- John Mohr (3, 6, 9)
- Luanne Mohr (3, 9)
- Gary Musick (3, 6, 9)
- The Kathie Hill Children's Singers (10)
- The Pinebrook Children's Choir – introductory vocals (10)

== Production ==
- John Helvering – executive producer
- Greg Nelson – producer
- Sandi Patti – producer
- Joe Neil – engineer
- Bill Brunt – design
- Michael Borum – photography

== Charts ==
Chart (1984)	Peak position
US Top Contemporary Christian Albums	2

=== Radio singles ===
Year	Singles	Peak positions
Year	Singles	CCM AC
1984–85	"Sing to the Lord"	1
1985	"We Will See Him As He Is"	4
1985	"Shine Down"	20
1985	"Via Dolorosa"	24

== Certifications and sales ==
Region	Certification	Certified units/sales
United States (RIAA)	Gold	500,000^{^}
^{^} Shipments figures based on certification alone.

== Accolades ==
GMA Dove Awards

- 1985 Female Vocalist of the Year
- 1985 Artist of the Year

Year	Winner	Category
1985	Songs from the Heart	Inspirational Album of the Year
