= Le Voyage (Sandi Patty album) =

Studio album by Sandi Patti
- Released: 1993
- Studio: Bunny Hop Studios (Los Angeles, California); Great Circle Sound, Greg Nelson Music Studio, Javalina West, The Music Mill, Nightengale Studios, Masterfonics, Quad Studios, Woodland Digital and Sixteenth Avenue Sound (Nashville, Tennessee); Studio at Mole End (Franklin, Tennessee); Pinebrook Recording Studios (Alexandria, Indiana)
- Genre: CCM, inspirational music, Christian pop
- Length: 57:44
- Label: Word
- Producer: Greg Nelson

Sandi Patti chronology
The Friendship Company: Open for Business (1991)	Le Voyage (1993)	Find It on the Wings (1994)

Professional ratings
Review scores
Source	Rating
AllMusic	3/5 stars

Le Voyage is the fourteenth studio album by Christian singer Sandi Patti, released in 1993 on Word Records. It's a concept album and it tells the story, done in a musical setting, featuring Patti as a character named Traveler, and she comes from a long line of Sojouners. It has been described as a modern retelling of Pilgrim's Progress featuring songs about traveling on a journey of faith. Le Voyage continues her inspirational sound but also adds some upbeat pop and adult contemporary sounds as well. Patti re-records a new version of "Unexpected Friends," originally from her 1990 album Another Time...Another Place and also features a duet with fellow Christian singer/songwriter and former Kansas lead singer John Elefante called "Home Will Find You." This would be the last album using her last name "Patti." Patti also released a companion book to go with the album. The album would top the Billboard Top Christian Albums chart and was nominated for a Grammy Award for Best Pop/Contemporary Gospel Album. In 1994, her music video for the first single "Hand On My Shoulder" won Short Form Music Video of the Year at the 25th GMA Dove Awards.

== Track listing ==
All songs written by Greg Nelson and Bob Farrell.

1. "Prologue" (instrumental) - 3:01
2. "Little Narrow Gate" - 4:21
3. "Home Will Find You" (duet with John Elefante) - 4:12
4. "Long Look" - 3:44
5. "Hand on My Shoulder" - 5:15
6. "All the Stars" - 5:06
7. "The Dilemma" - 5:03
8. "Forest of Fears" - 5:19
9. "In the Tenderlands" - 4:34
10. "Unexpected Friends" - 3:40
11. "Theme from The City of Rest" (instrumental) - 3:36
12. "Love Can Open the Door" - 3:44
13. "No Place to Lay My Head" - 6:11

== Personnel ==
- Sandi Patti – vocals (2–10, 12, 13)
- Eric Persing – synthesizer programming
- David Hamilton – synthesizers (1), arrangements (1), string arrangements and conductor (1), keyboards (5), concept (11)
- Robbie Buchanan – acoustic piano (2–5), arrangements (2–6, 8, 11, 12), keyboards (4–8), programming (11, 12)
- Blair Masters – synthesizers (2, 10)
- Phil Naish – synthesizers (3)
- David Huntsinger – acoustic piano (10, 13)
- Tom Hemby – guitars (1, 3, 4, 6–9, 11)
- Dann Huff – guitars (2–5, 7, 11, 12)
- Jackie Street – bass (3–5, 7, 8, 11)
- Gary Lunn – bass (9)
- Paul Leim – drums (3–8, 11)
- Farrell Morris – percussion (3, 6, 7, 11)
- Tom McAninch – French horn (1)
- Eberhard Ramm – French horn (1)
- Joy Worland – French horn (1)
- Pamela Sixfin – violin solo (1)
- Mark Douthit – saxophone (6, 8)
- Sam Levine – soprano saxophone (9)
- Nashville String Machine – strings (1, 2, 5, 9–11, 13)
- Carl Gorodetzky – orchestra contractor (1, 2, 5, 9–11, 13)
- Greg Nelson – arrangements (1, 7, 9, 10, 13)
- Jeremy Lubbock – string arrangements and conductor (2, 5, 10, 11, 13)
- Ronn Huff – string arrangements and conductor (9)
- John Elefante – vocals (3)
- Alan Moore – BGV arrangements (3, 4, 12)
- Bob Carlisle – backing vocals (3, 12)
- Beverly Darnall – backing vocals (3, 12)
- Michael Eldred – backing vocals (3, 12)
- Lisa Glasgow – backing vocals (3, 12)
- Mark Ivey – backing vocals (3)
- Tammy Jensen – backing vocals (3, 12)
- Bonnie Keen – backing vocals (3, 12)
- Ellen Musick – backing vocals (3, 12)
- Guy Penrod – backing vocals (3, 12)
- Leah Taylor – backing vocals (3, 12)
- Mervyn Warren – backing vocals (3, 4, 12)
- Chris Willis – backing vocals (3, 12)
- Vicki Hampton – backing vocals (4)
- Donna McElroy – backing vocals (4)

Production

- Matt Baugher – executive producer
- Greg Nelson – producer
- Bill Deaton – engineer, vocal engineer, mixing
- Bob Clark – string engineer
- Brent King – string engineer, vocal engineer
- Chip Birge – assistant engineer, mix assistant
- Robert Charles – assistant engineer
- Todd Little – assistant engineer
- Carry Summers – assistant engineer
- Greg Parker – mix assistant
- Doug Sax – mastering at The Mastering Lab (Hollywood, California)
- Holly Krig-Smith – production coordinator
- Loren Balman – art direction
- Patrick Pollei – art direction, design
- Neill Whitlock – photography

== Charts ==
Chart (1993)	Peak position
US Top Contemporary Christian Albums	1

=== Radio singles ===
Year	Singles	Peak positions
Year	Singles	CCM AC
1993	"Hand on my Shoulder"	6
1993	"Long Look"	2
1993–94	"Love Can Open the Door"	9
1994	"Home Will Find You" (with John Elefante)	20

== Accolades ==
GMA Dove Awards

Year	Winner	Category
1994	"Hand On My Shoulder"	Short Form Music Video of the Year
