= 22nd GMA Dove Awards =

1991 US music awards ceremony

- Date: April 11, 1991
- Location: Grand Ole Opry House, Nashville, Tennessee
- Hosted by: Clifton Davis and Sandi Patti

The 22nd Annual GMA Dove Awards were held on April 11, 1991, recognizing accomplishments of musicians for the year 1990. The show was held at the Grand Ole Opry House in Nashville, Tennessee, and was hosted by Clifton Davis and Sandi Patti.

== Award recipients ==
=== Artists ===
- Artist of the Year
  - Steven Curtis Chapman
- New Artist of the Year
  - 4Him
- Male Vocalist of the Year
  - Steven Curtis Chapman
- Female Vocalist of the Year
  - Sandi Patti
- Group of the Year
  - Petra
- Songwriter of the Year
  - Steven Curtis Chapman

=== Songs ===
- Song of the Year
  - "Another Time, Another Place"; Gary Driskell; Word Music (ASCAP)
- Rap/Hip Hop Recorded Song of the Year
  - "It's Time"; Return; The Winans featuring Teddy Riley
- Rock Recorded Song of the Year
  - "Beyond Belief"; Beyond Belief; Petra
- Pop/Contemporary Recorded Song of the Year
  - "Another Time, Another Place"; Another Time...Another Place; Sandi Patti, Wayne Watson
- Hard Music Song of the Year
  - "Stranger"; Holy Soldier; Holy Soldier
- Southern Gospel Recorded Song of the Year
  - "He Is Here"; The Talleys
- Inspirational Recorded Song of the Year
  - "Who Will Be Jesus?"; The Great Exchange; Bruce Carroll
- Country Recorded Song of the Year
  - "Seein' My Father in Me"; Sowin' Love; Paul Overstreet
- Traditional Gospel Recorded Song of the Year
  - "The Potter's House"; Live; Tramaine Hawkins, Walter Hawkins, V. Michael McKay
- Contemporary Gospel Recorded Song of the Year
  - "I L-O-V-E U"; So Much 2 Say; Take 6

=== Albums ===
- Rap/Hip Hop Album of the Year
  - Nu Thang; DC Talk
- Rock Album of the Year
  - Beyond Belief; Petra
- Pop/Contemporary Album of the Year
  - Go West Young Man; Michael W. Smith
- Hard Music Album of the Year
  - Holy Soldier; Holy Soldier
- Southern Gospel Album of the Year
  - Climbing Higher & Higher; The Cathedrals
- Inspirational Album of the Year
  - Another Time...Another Place; Sandi Patti
- Country Album of the Year
  - Sojouner's Song; Buddy Greene
- Traditional Gospel Album of the Year
  - Live; Tramaine Hawkins
- Contemporary Gospel Album of the Year
  - So Much 2 Say; Take 6
- Instrumental Album of the Year
  - Come Before Him; Dick Tunney
- Praise & Worship Album of the Year
  - Strong And Mighty Hands; Voices of Praise
- Children's Music Album of the Year
  - Hide 'Em In Your Heart: Bible Memory Melodies, Vol. 1; Steve Green
- Musical Album of the Year
  - Handel's Young Messiah; Various Artists
- Choral Collection Album of the Year
  - I Call You to Praise; Steve Green
- Recorded Music Packaging of the Year
  - Buddy Jackson, Mark Tucker; Beyond Belief; Petra

=== Videos ===
- Short Form Music Video of the Year
  - "Revival in the Land"; Carman; Stephen Yake
- Long Form Music Video of the Year
  - Revival in the Land; Carman; Stephen Yake
