= Falling Forward (Sandi Patty album) =

Studio album by Sandi Patty
- Released: April 10, 2007
- Studio: Vibe 56, Masterfonics Tracking Room, OmniSound Studios and Paragon Studios (Nashville, Tennessee): Gaither Studios (Alexandria, Indiana); Area 52 Studios (Saugerties, New York).
- Genre: CCM
- Label: INO
- Producer: David Hamilton

Sandi Patty chronology
The Definitive Collection (2007)	Falling Forward (2007)	The Edge of the Divine (2010)

Falling Forward is the audio companion to Sandi Patty's autobiographical book of the same name presenting a collection of the singer's Christian pop songs.

== Track listings ==
1. "Made Me Glad" - 5:28
2. "Sing to the King" - 4:43
3. "Falling Forward" - 4:11
4. Sweeter Medley: "Sweeter" / "Blessed Be Your Name" / "You Are Good" - 4:54
5. "Step into the Joy" - 3:18
6. "In My Heart" - 4:37
7. "Found" - 4:09
8. Sandi's Medley: "Upon This Rock" / "In the Name of the Lord" / "Who Will Call Him King of Kings?" - 5:43
9. "You Call Me Yours" - 5:08
10. "Grace Flows Down" (with daughter Jenn Helvering) - 4:52

== Awards ==
In 2008, the album was nominated for a Dove Award for Inspirational Album of the Year at the 39th GMA Dove Awards.

== Personnel ==
- Sandi Patty – vocals
- David Hamilton – acoustic piano, Hammond B3 organ, synthesizers, programming, track and vocal arrangements, orchestra arrangements and conductor
- Tyrone Dickerson – Hammond B3 organ (5)
- Mark Baldwin – acoustic guitar, electric guitar, nylon-string guitar
- David Cleveland – acoustic guitar, electric guitar
- Craig Nelson – bass
- Dan Needham – drums
- Eric Darken – percussion
- Sam Levine – alto saxophone, tenor saxophone
- Jimmy Bowland – baritone saxophone
- Roy Agee – trombone
- Vinnie Ciesielski – trumpet
- Steve Patrick – trumpet
- Lloyd Barry – horn arrangements
- Nashville String Machine – orchestra
- Dave Williamson – string arrangements
- Ric Domenico – music director
- Eberhard Ramm – music director
- Angela Cruz – backing vocals (1, 2, 4, 8)
- Sherry Carter – backing vocals (1, 2, 4, 8)
- Ronnie Freeman – backing vocals (1, 2, 4, 8)
- Tammy Jensen – backing vocals (1, 2, 4, 8)
- Jaimee Paul – backing vocals (1, 2, 4, 8)
- Nirva Ready – backing vocals (1, 2, 4, 5, 8)
- Chance Scoggins – backing vocals (1, 2, 4, 8), BGV leader (1, 2, 4, 8)
- Michelle Swift – backing vocals (1, 2, 4)
- Terry White – backing vocals (1, 2, 4, 8)
- Melinda Doolittle – backing vocals (5)
- Peter Penrose – backing vocals (5)
- Jenn Helvering – vocals (10)

Choir

- Jenn Helvering, Lisa Huff, Amy Rouse, Jay Rouse, Sarah Scharborough, Ricky Vale, Steve Williamson and Jennifer Wilson

Production

- Mike Atkins – executive producer
- Jeff Moseley – executive producer
- David Hamilton – producer, additional recording, digital editing
- Danny Duncan – rhythm track recording
- David Beano – vocal recording, musical assistance, digital editing
- David Hill – vocal recording, BGV recording
- David Schober – orchestra recording
- Jeff Aebi – musical assistance
- Jeff Cain – musical assistance, digital editing
- Scott Kidd – musical assistance
- Tom Reeves – musical assistance
- Ronnie Brookshire – mixing
- Jim Cooley – mix assistant
- Juan Portera – digital editing, production assistant
- Andrew Mendelson – mastering at Georgetown Masters (Nashville, Tennessee)
- James Rueger – A&R
- Derek West – A&R
- Ken "Snakehips" Johnson & His West Indian Dance Orchestra – production coordination
- Hans Nelson – production assistant
- Dana Salcedo – creative director, stylist
- Ben Arrowood – design
- Russ Harrington – photography

== Chart performance ==
Chart (2007)	Peak position
US Christian Albums (Billboard)	45
