= Another Time...Another Place =

Studio album by Sandi Patti
- Released: September 17, 1990
- Studio: Bunny Hop, Los Angeles; Digital Recorders, Nashville; Javalina, Nashville; Ocean Way, Hollywood; Schnee Studios, Los Angeles; Pinebrook, Alexandria
- Genre: CCM, inspirational music
- Length: 48:39
- Label: Word
- Producer: Greg Nelson, Sandi Patti

Sandi Patti chronology
| The Finest Moments (1989) | Another Time...Another Place (1990) | The Friendship Company: Open for Business (1991) |

Professional ratings
Review scores
| Source | Rating |
|---|---|
| AllMusic | 3/5 stars |

Another Time...Another Place is the twelfth studio album by Christian singer Sandi Patti, released in 1990 on Word Records. Like her 1986 best seller and award-winning album Morning Like This, Another Time...Another Place was another definitive album with in addition to her inspirational anthems, there are also some pop elements and uptempo songs. The title song features a duet with fellow Christian singer and songwriter Wayne Watson. It became a successful hit climbing to No. 1 on the Christian AC chart and would win them a GMA Dove Award for Pop/Contemporary Song of the Year and it also won Song of the Year, given to its writer Gary Driskell. The album also features popular CCM recording artist Amy Grant providing guest vocals on the song "Unexpected Friends". In 1991, Patti would win her fifth and final Grammy Award for Best Pop/Contemporary Gospel Album at the 33rd Grammy Awards and wins Female Vocalist of the Year and Inspirational Album of the Year at the 22nd GMA Dove Awards. Its music video won Short Form Music Video of the Year in 1992. The album peaked at No. 2 on the Billboard Top Christian Albums chart and was certified Gold in 1992 by the Recording Industry Association of America. The CD version contains a bonus track "Rejoice", originally recorded by Christian pop group NewSong.

== Track listing ==
| No. | Title | Writer(s) | Length |
|---|---|---|---|
| 1. | "Unto Us" (Isaiah 9) | Larry & Lesa Bryant | 4:36 |
| 2. | "Another Time, Another Place" (duet with Wayne Watson) | Gary Driskell | 5:25 |
| 3. | "I Will Rejoice" | Michael W. Smith, Beverly Darnell | 2:32 |
| 4. | "Unexpected Friends" (guest vocals by Amy Grant) | Greg Nelson, Bob Farrell | 5:56 |
| 5. | "I'll Give You Peace" | Dawn Thomas, Tom Yarborough | 4:33 |
| 6. | "For All The World" | Greg Nelson, Bob Farrell | 4:26 |
| 7. | "Rejoice" (bonus track on CD) | Eddie Carswell, Oliver Wells | 2:44 |
| 8. | "Willing To Wait" | Mike Patty, Craig Patty, Brent Henderson | 4:17 |
| 9. | "I Lift My Hands" | Bob Farrell | 3:47 |
| 10. | "Who Will Call Him King of Kings" | Greg Nelson, Bob Farrell, Sandi Patti | 5:29 |
| 11. | "O Calvary's Lamb" | Chaz Bosarge, Bill George, Tommy Greer | 4:54 |

== Personnel ==
- Sandi Patti – vocals, rhythm track arrangements (3, 5, 8, 10, 11)
- Robbie Buchanan – keyboards, synth bass, rhythm track arrangements (4, 6, 10)
- Randy Kerber – keyboards, acoustic piano
- Eric Persing – synthesizer programming
- Dan Lee – guitars (1–4, 6–11)
- Marty Walsh – guitars (5)
- Paul Jackson Jr. – additional guitars (6)
- Nathan East – bass (1–9, 11)
- Gary Lunn – bass (10)
- Jeff Porcaro – drums (1–9, 11), percussion
- John Robinson – drums (10)
- Charles Loper – brass (7, 8)
- Bill Reichenbach Jr. – brass (7, 8)
- Gary Grant – brass (7, 8)
- Jerry Hey – brass (7, 8), brass arrangements (7, 8)
- The Nashville String Machine – strings (1, 2, 4, 5, 6, 9, 10, 11)
- Carl Gorodetzky – string leader (1, 2, 4, 5, 6, 9, 10, 11)
- Alan Moore – string arrangements (1, 7)
- Greg Nelson – string conductor (1, 6, 7), rhythm track arrangements (4, 5, 6, 10, 11), string arrangements (6)
- Jeremy Lubbock – string arrangements and conductor (2, 4, 5)
- David T. Clydesdale – string arrangements and conductor (8, 9, 11), orchestra arrangements and conductor (10)
- John Higgins – rhythm track arrangements (8)
- Craig Patty – rhythm track arrangements (8)
- Michael Patty – rhythm track arrangements (8)
- Bob Farrell – rhythm track arrangements (9)
- Wayne Watson – vocals (2)
- Amy Grant – vocals (4)

Backing vocals

- Alan Moore – arrangements (1, 6)
- John Bahler – arrangements (7, 8)
- John Higgins – vocal concept (8)
- John Darnall – vocal contractor (10)

Singers

- Mike Eldred (1, 6, 10)
- Lisa Glasgow (1, 6)
- Mark Ivey (1, 6, 10)
- Marty McCall (1, 6)
- Sandi Patti (1, 5–10)
- Melodie Tunney (1, 6, 10)
- Kenny Day Jones – ad-lib vocal (3)
- John Bahler (7)
- Tom Bahler (7)
- Susan Boyd (7)
- Debbie Hall (7)
- Jon Joyce (7)
- Mary Bates George (10)
- Ellen Dockery (10)
- Ellen Musick (10)
- Gary Musick (10)
- Guy Penrod (10)
- Gary Robinson (10)
- Leah Taylor (10)

Choirs

- Christ Church Choir (3, 6)
- Landy Gardner – choir director (3, 6)
- The Kid Connection Choir (6)
- Janet McMahon-Wilson – kids choir director (6)

== Production ==
- John Helvering – executive producer
- Greg Nelson – producer
- Sandi Patti – producer
- Jeff Balding – engineer
- Jeff Abbey – additional engineer
- Ken Allardyce – additional engineer
- Mark Aspinall – additional engineer
- Bob Clark – additional engineer
- Tommy Cooper – additional engineer
- James DeMain – additional engineer
- Clark Germain – additional engineer
- Brian Jannsen – additional engineer, production coordinator
- John Kunz – additional engineer
- Bob Loftus – additional engineer
- Rail Rogut – additional engineer
- Michael C. Ross – additional engineer
- Eric Rudd – additional engineer
- Hill Brim Swimmer – additional engineer
- Frank Wolf – additional engineer
- Doug Sax – mastering at The Mastering Lab (Hollywood, California)
- Cindy Wilt – production coordinator
- Bob Muldoon – production assistance
- Brett Perry – production assistance
- Loren Balman – art direction, design, interior photography
- Patrick Pollei – art direction, design
- Pam Allen – design assistant
- Janice Gibson – design assistant
- Neill Whitlock – cover photography, interior photography
- Mary Gross – album coordinator

== Charts ==
| Chart (1990) | Peak position |
|---|---|
| US Top Contemporary Christian Albums | 2 |

=== Radio singles ===
| Year | Singles | Peak positions | |
| Year | Singles | CCM AC | CCM CHR |
|---|---|---|---|
| 1990 | "Another Time, Another Place" (with Wayne Watson) | 1 | 8 |
| 1991 | "I'll Give You Peace" | 3 | 24 |
| 1991 | "For All The World" | 4 | - |
| 1991 | "Unexpected Friends" | 1 | - |
| 1992 | "Who Will Call Him King of Kings" | 32 | - |

== Certifications and sales ==
| Region | Certification | Certified units/sales |
|---|---|---|
| United States (RIAA) | Gold | 500,000^{^} |
^{^} Shipments figures based on certification alone.

== Accolades ==
Grammy Awards

| Year | Winner | Category |
|---|---|---|
| 1991 | Another Time...Another Place | Best Pop/Contemporary Gospel Album |

GMA Dove Awards

- 1991 Female Vocalist of the Year

| Year | Winner | Category |
|---|---|---|
| 1991 | Another Time...Another Place | Inspirational Album of the Year |
| 1991 | "Another Time, Another Place" (with Wayne Watson) | Pop/Contemporary Song of the Year |
| 1992 | "Another Time, Another Place" (with Wayne Watson) | Short Form Music Video of the Year |
| 1992 | "For All The World" (written by Greg Nelson & Bob Farrell) | Inspirational Song of the Year |
