= Upon This Rock =

Upon This Rock may refer to:

- The phrase "Upon this rock I will build my church", taken from the Confession of Peter in the Gospel of Matthew.

== Film and television ==
- Upon This Rock (film), a 1970 British film starring Dirk Bogarde
- "Upon This Rock" (Heroes), a 2010 American TV episode

== Music ==
- Upon This Rock (Larry Norman album), a 1969 album by Larry Norman
- Upon This Rock (Joe Farrell album), a 1974 album by Joe Farrell
- "Upon This Rock," a track by Sandi Patty from her 1983 live LP, More Than Wonderful

== Other ==
- Upon This Rock, a series of SF novels by David Marusek
