= Christmas: The Gift Goes On =

- 1987 Word Records re-issue cover

Studio album by Sandi Patti
- Released: 1983
- Studio: Great Circle Sound, Nashville, Tennessee; Sound Shop, Nashville, Tennessee; Bullet Studios, Nashville, Tennessee
- Genre: Contemporary Christian, Christmas
- Length: 35:24
- Label: Impact (Word 1987 re-issue)
- Producer: David T. Clydesdale, Greg Nelson, Sandi Patti

Sandi Patti chronology
More Than Wonderful (1983)	Christmas: The Gift Goes On (1983)	Songs from the Heart (1984)

Professional ratings
Review scores
Source	Rating
AllMusic	4.5/5 stars

Christmas: The Gift Goes On is the first Christmas album by gospel singer Sandi Patti originally issued in 1983 by Impact Records, then re-issued in 1987 by Word Records with a new album cover. The album consists of some traditional Christmas tunes and hymns along with original Christmas songs. The album reached No. 9 on the Billboard Top Christian Albums chart. The album was nominated for Best Gospel Performance, Female at the 26th Annual Grammy Awards and was certified Gold by the RIAA in 1988.

== Track listing ==
No.	Title	Writer(s)	Length
1.	"Worship The King"	Billy Smiley, Bill George	3:14
2.	"Worship The Gift" (Medley)	Edmund Sears, Richard Storrs Willis, William J. Kirkpatrick, William Chatterton Dix, Phillips Brooks, Lewis Redner	4:01
3.	"The Gift Goes On"	Ron Harris, Claire Cloninger	3:03
4.	"Christmas Was Meant for Children"	Gordon Goodman, Chuck Evans	2:33
5.	"Jesu Bambino/O Holy Night"	Pietro Yon/John Sullivan Dwight, Adolphe Adams	4:40
6.	"Worship The King (Reprise)/Celebrate The Gift" (Medley)	Billy Smiley, Bill George/George F. Handel, Charles Wesley, Felix Mendelssohn, Issac Watts	2:39
7.	"I Wonder As I Wander"	John Jacob Niles	2:50
8.	"O Magnify The Lord"	Dick and Melodie Tunney	2:01
9.	"Bethlehem Morning"	Morris Chapman	5:00
10.	"Merry Christmas With Love/Have Yourself A Merry Little Christmas"	Billy Smiley, Greg Davis/Ralph Blane, Hugh Martin	5:02

== Charts ==
Chart (1983)	Peak position
US Top Contemporary Christian Albums	9

=== Radio singles ===
Year	Singles	Peak positions
Year	Singles	CCM AC
1983-84	"O Magnify The Lord"	6

== Certifications and sales ==
Region	Certification	Certified units/sales
United States (RIAA)	Gold	500,000^{^}
^{^} Shipments figures based on certification alone.
