= Broadway Stories =

Studio album by Sandi Patty
- Released: 2011
- Genres: Contemporary Christian music; gospel
- Label: Stylo Entertainment

Sandi Patty chronology
The Edge of the Divine (2010)	Broadway Stories (2011)	Everlasting (2013)

Broadway Stories is a studio album released by Christian singer Sandi Patty in 2011 on Stylo Entertainment. The album was recorded with The City of Prague Philharmonic Orchestra under the direction of conductor Jack Everly.

== Critical reception ==
Professional ratings
Review scores
Source	Rating
Allmusic	3/5 stars
Indianapolis Business Journal	(favourable)
Christianity Today	4/5 stars

Jon O' Brien of Allmusic gave the album a 3 out of 5 stars rating saying "Broadway Stories' concept may be nothing new, but its sweeping orchestral arrangements, diverse material, and Patty's warm vocals ensure that it's one of the classier musical theater-based releases of the year." With a 4 out of 5 stars rating Andrew Greer of Christianity Today proclaimed "Recorded in Prague with a dreamy orchestra, Patty's illustrious power pipes perfectly master the challenging repertoire. But the five-time Grammy winner is more than a skilled technician. She is a heartfelt storyteller, making Sandi and Stories a winning combo."

== Track listing ==
No.	Title	Writer(s)	Length
1.	"Can't Help Lovin' Dat Man"	Oscar Hammerstein II, Jerome Kern	4:27
2.	"Smile"	Charlie Chaplin, Geoffrey Parsons, John Turner	4:07
3.	"Swingin' Love Medley: I Just Found Out About Love/This Can't Be Love/Our Love Is Here To Stay"	Harold Adamson, George Gershwin, Ira Gershwin, Lorenz Hart, Jimmy McHugh, Richard Rodgers	5:16
4.	"The Sound Of Music Medley: The Sound Of Music/My Favorite Things/Do-Re-Mi/Edelweiss/Climb Every Mountain"	Oscar Hammerstein II, Richard Rodgers	7:43
5.	"The Man I Love"	George Gershwin, Ira Gershwin	3:52
6.	"All Of Me"	Gerald Marks, Seymour Simons	2:36
7.	"A Doll Sings The Guys: Willkommen/If I Were A Rich Man/Ya Got Trouble/Oh, What a Beautiful Mornin'/Get Me To The Church On Time/Bring Him Home"	Jerry Bock, Alain Boublil, Fred Ebb, Sheldon Hamick, Oscar Hammerstein II, John Kander, Herbert Kretzmer, Alan Jay Lerner, Frederick Loewe, Richard Rodgers, Claude-Michel Schönberg, Meredith Willson	8:32
8.	"Send In The Clowns"	Stephen Sondheim	4:41
9.	"Love Is Only Love"	Jerry Herman, Michael Stewart	3:46
10.	"You'll Never Walk Alone"	Oscar Hammerstein II, Richard Rodgers	4:23
Total length:			49:23
