= Find It on the Wings =

Studio album by Sandi Patty
- Released: October 25, 1994
- Studio: Bennett House and Tejas Recorders (Franklin, Tennessee); The Dugout, Great Circle Sound, Greg Nelson Studio, Digital Associates, Sound Stage Studios, OmniSound Studios and Sixteenth Avenue Sound (Nashville, Tennessee); Doppler Studios (Atlanta, Georgia); Gaither Studios (Alexandria, Indiana); Bunny Hop Studios and Schnee Studios (Los Angeles, California); Flying Monkey and Right Track Recording (New York City, New York); Crescent Moon Studios (Miami, Florida)
- Genre: CCM, inspirational music, Christian pop
- Length: 50:22
- Label: Word
- Producer: Greg Nelson, Phil Ramone

Sandi Patty chronology
Le Voyage (1993)	Find It on the Wings (1994)	O Holy Night! (1996)

Professional ratings
Review scores
Source	Rating
AllMusic	3/5 stars

Find It on the Wings is the fifteenth studio album by Christian singer Sandy Patty, released in late 1994 on Word Records. It is the first album on which the singer uses her real last name Patty, and she continued to use it on future releases. Patty collaborated with producer Phil Ramone and songwriters Burt Bacharach and Will Jennings on the song "If I Want To", while her long-time producer Greg Nelson produced the rest of the album. Patty also duetted with R&B singer Peabo Bryson on the gospel track "Make It 'til Tomorrow". Bob Farrell co-wrote the majority of the songs with producer Nelson. Cindy Morgan contributed the song "When I Heal". In 1995, Patty was nominated for Female Vocalist of the Year at the 26th GMA Dove Awards, losing to CeCe Winans, but the album did win Inspirational Album of the Year. In 1996, Find It on the Wings was nominated for a Grammy for Best Pop/Contemporary Gospel Album at the 38th Grammy Awards. The album peaked at number three on the Billboard Top Christian Albums chart.

== Track listing ==
No.	Title	Writer(s)	Length
1.	"Find It on the Wings"	Tommy Sims; Bob Farrell	4:25
2.	"Holy Lord/Carry On"	Sandi Patty	6:20
3.	"Make It 'til Tomorrow" (duet with Peabo Bryson)	Farrell; Greg Nelson; Bruce Martin	4:12
4.	"When I Heal"	Cindy Morgan	5:36
5.	"Where the Nails Were"	Gary Driskell; Marty Hennis	4:55
6.	"Build My World Around You"	Grant Cunningham; Matt Huesmann	3:35
7.	"If I Want To"	Burt Bacharach; Will Jennings	4:08
8.	"Safe Harbour"	Farrell; Nelson	5:18
9.	"God Is Walking Me Through"	Farrell; Cheryl Rogers; Shane Keister	3:54
10.	"Through the Eyes of a Child"	Farrell; Nelson	5:07
11.	"Imagine (How God Can Sing)"	John Barlow Jarvis; Phil McHugh	2:32

Note: "If I Want To" was produced by Phil Ramone. All other tracks were produced by Greg Nelson.

== Personnel ==
- Sandi Patty – vocals, concept (6)
- Tommy Sims – programming (1, 3), arrangements (1, 3), bass (8, 10)
- Danny Duncan – programming assistant (1, 3), additional arrangements (1, 3)
- David Hamilton – programming (2), orchestrations and conductor (2), additional synthesizers (3), acoustic piano (10)
- Phil Naish – additional synthesizers (2, 3, 5, 8)
- Michael Omartian – programming (4), orchestrations and conductor (4)
- Robbie Buchanan – programming (5), arrangements (5)
- Blair Masters – programming (6), arrangements (6)
- Rob Mounsey – keyboard programming (7), arrangements (7)
- Shane Keister – keyboards (8), additional synthesizers (10)
- Alan Pasqua – keyboards (8), additional synthesizers (10)
- Randy Kerber – acoustic piano (11)
- Dann Huff – guitars (2, 4, 5, 10), programming (9), arrangements (9)
- Gary Lunn – bass (2, 4)
- Paul Leim – drums (2, 8)
- David Huff – additional drum programming (9)
- Mark Hammond – drums (10)
- Farrell Morris – percussion (4)
- Jeff Porcaro – percussion (11)
- Andy Snitzer – tenor saxophone (7)
- Nashville String Machine – strings (2, 4, 5, 11)
- Ronn Huff – orchestrations (5)
- Jeremy Lubbock – string arrangements (11)
- Mervyn Warren – BGV arrangements (1), choir arrangements (3)
- Bob Bailey – backing vocals (1), choir (3)
- Kim Fleming – backing vocals (1), choir (3)
- Vicki Hampton – backing vocals (1), choir (3)
- Yvonne Hodges – backing vocals (1), choir (3)
- Skyler Jett – backing vocals (1), choir (3)
- Donna McElroy – backing vocals (1), choir (3)
- Angela Primm – backing vocals (1), choir (3)
- Duawne Starling – backing vocals (1), choir (3)
- Chris Willis – backing vocals (1), choir (3)
- The Kid Connection – choir (1)
- Bob Carlisle – backing vocals (2)
- Chris Eaton – backing vocals (2, 6, 8, 9)
- Mark Ivey – backing vocals (2)
- Peabo Bryson – vocals (3)
- Chris Rodriguez – backing vocals (6)

Production

- Matt Baugher – executive producer
- Sandi Patty – executive producer (7)
- Jeff Balding – engineer (1–6, 8–11)
- Steve Bishir – engineer (1–6, 8–11)
- Terry Christianson – engineer (1–6, 8–11)
- Bob Clark – engineer (1–6, 8–11)
- Tommy Cooper – engineer (1–6, 8–11)
- Bill Deaton – engineer (1–6, 8–11), mixing (1–6, 8–11)
- Brent King – engineer (1–6, 8–11)
- Frank Wolf – engineer (1–6, 8–11)
- Jeff Aebi – second engineer (1–6, 8–11)
- Blake Eiseman – second engineer (1–6, 8–11)
- Joey Grimstead – second engineer (1–6, 8–11)
- Scott Link – second engineer (1–6, 8–11)
- Shawn McLean – second engineer (1–6, 8–11)
- Wayne Mehl – second engineer (1–6, 8–11)
- Ray Mendez – second engineer (1–6, 8–11)
- Michael Moore – second engineer (1–6, 8–11)
- David Murphy – second engineer (1–6, 8–11)
- Brett Perry – second engineer (1–6, 8–11)
- Carry Summers – second engineer (1–6, 8–11), mix assistant (1–6, 8–11)
- Aaron Swihart – second engineer (1–6, 8–11)
- Shane D. Wilson – second engineer (1–6, 8–11)
- Martin Woodlee – second engineer (1–6, 8–11)
- Pete Martinez – mix assistant (1–6, 8–11)
- Richard Alderson – engineer (7)
- John Patterson – mixing (7)
- Phil Ramone – mixing (7)
- Eric Schilling – mixing (7)
- Jay Militscher – mix assistant (7)
- Jen Monnar – mix assistant (7)
- Hank Williams – editing at MasterMix (Nashville, Tennessee) (2)
- Doug Sax – mastering at The Mastering Lab (Hollywood, California) (1–6, 8–11)
- Holly Krig-Smith – production coordinator (1–6, 8–11)
- Jill Dell'Abate – production coordinator (7)
- Benji Cowart – additional production assistant (1–6, 8–11)
- Jacob Wang – additional production assistant (1–6, 8–11)
- Loren Balman – art direction
- Karrine Caulkins – design
- Buddy Jackson – design
- Neill Whitlock – photography

== Charts ==
Chart (1994)	Peak position
US Top Contemporary Christian Albums	3

=== Radio singles ===
Year	Singles	Peak positions
Year	Singles	CCM AC
1994-95	"Carry On"	3
1995	"Find It on the Wings"	6
1995	"Build My World Around You"	4

== Accolades ==
GMA Dove Awards

Year	Winner	Category
1995	Find It on the Way	Inspirational Album of the Year
