= Hymns Just for You =

Studio album by Sandi Patti
- Released: 1985
- Studio: Pinebrook Recording Studios (Alexandria, Indiana)
- Genre: Contemporary Christian music, gospel, hymns
- Length: 45:05
- Label: Benson
- Producer: Greg Nelson, Sandi Patti

Sandi Patti chronology
Songs from the Heart (1984)	Hymns Just for You (1985)	Morning Like This (1986)

Professional ratings
Review scores
Source	Rating
AllMusic	4/5 stars

Hymns Just for You is the eighth album by Christian/Gospel singer Sandi Patti. Released in 1985, it would be her final album on the Benson label. It is an album of hymns with five of the track done in medleys covering a selection of songs that people have sung in churches. The album peaked at No. 2 on the Billboard Top Christian Albums chart. Patti was nominated for Best Gospel Performance, Female at the 28th Annual Grammy Awards in 1986. The album was certified Gold in 1986 and Platinum in 1989 by the Recording Industry Association of America for sales of over one million copies. In 1990, Hymns Just for You was re-issued on Word Records.

== Track listing ==
No.	Title	Writer(s)	Length
1.	"It Is Well with My Soul"	Public Domain	4:18
2.	"Medley: Fairest Lord Jesus/I'd Rather Have Jesus"	Public Domain/Rhea F. Miller, George Beverly Shea	4:23
3.	"How Great Thou Art"	Stuart K. Hine	5:18
4.	"Medley: In The Garden/Just A Closer Walk With Thee/What A Friend We Have in Jesus"	Austin Miles/Public Domain	4:34
5.	"The Old Rugged Cross"	George Bennard	3:30
6.	"The Lord's Prayer"	Albert Hay Malotte	2:38
7.	"Amazing Grace"	Public Domain	3:30
8.	"Medley: To God Be the Glory/Holy, Holy, Holy/Blessed Assurance/Great Is Thy Faithfulness"	Public Domain/Thomas Chisholm	4:44
9.	"Medley: A Mighty Fortress Is Our God/Rock of Ages/Victory in Jesus/Because He Lives"	Public Domain/Eugene Monroe Bartlett/Bill Gaither, Gloria Gaither	4:44
10.	"Medley: Sweet Hour of Prayer/I Need Thee Every Hour/Just As I Am/Turn Your Eyes Upon Jesus"	Public Domain/Annie Hawks, Robert Lowry/Helen Howarth Lemmel	6:23

== Personnel ==
- Sandi Patti – vocals
- David Huntsinger – acoustic piano
- Rex Thomas – guitars
- Steve Dokken – bass
- Mark Hammond – drums
- Farrell Morris – percussion (2, 4, 6, 8, 9, 10)
- David T. Clydesdale – orchestra arrangements and conductor (1, 3, 5, 7)
- Alan Moore – orchestra arrangements and conductor (2, 4, 6, 8, 9, 10)

Backing vocals

- Jim Bittner, Tammy Boyer, Cozette Byrd, Beverly Darnall, John Darnall, Lisa DeHaan, Brian Felter, Sharon Felter, Greg McCaw, Greg Meyer, Sandi Patti Helvering, Craig Patty, Mike Patty, Dwight Robertson, Melodie Tunney and Carol Vader

Production

- John L. Helvering – executive producer
- Greg Nelson – producer
- Sandi Patti – producer
- John Bolt – chief engineer
- Mark Aspinall – assistant engineer (1, 3, 5, 7)
- Steve Archer – assistant engineer (1, 3, 5, 7)
- Kevin Thompson – assistant engineer (2, 4, 6, 8, 9, 10)
- David T. Clydesdale – production assistance
- Kent Hunter – cover design
- Thomas Ryan Design – cover design
- Larry Williams – photography
- The Helvering Agency – management

== Charts ==
Chart (1985)	Peak position
US Top Contemporary Christian Albums	2

=== Radio singles ===
Year	Singles	Peak positions
Year	Singles	CCM AC
1986	"How Great Thou Art"	27

== Accolades ==
GMA Dove Awards

- 1986 Female Vocalist of the Year

== Certifications and sales ==
Region	Certification	Certified units/sales
United States (RIAA)	Platinum	1,000,000^{^}
^{^} Shipments figures based on certification alone.
