= Grammy Award for Best Gospel Vocal Performance, Female =

Music award category

- Awarded for: quality female vocal performances in the gospel music genre
- Country: United States
- Presented by: National Academy of Recording Arts and Sciences
- First award: 1984
- Final award: 1990
- Website: grammy.com

The Grammy Award for Best Gospel Vocal Performance, Female was awarded in from 1984 to 1990. From 1984 to 1989 it was titled the Grammy Award for Best Gospel Performance, Female.

Years reflect the year in which the Grammy Awards were presented, for works released in the previous year.

== Recipients ==
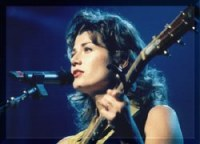
Amy Grant was the first recipient of the Award, in total she was a four-time award winner.

Year	Performing artist	Nationality	Work	Nominees	Ref.
1984	Amy Grant	United States	"Ageless Medley"	Cynthia Clawson – "Come Celebrate Jesus"; Sandi Patty – Christmas: The Gift Goes On; Michele Pillar – Reign On Me; Sheila Walsh – War of Love	
1985	Amy Grant	United States	"Angels"	Debby Boone – Surrender; Sandi Patty – Songs from the Heart; Michele Pillar – Look Who Loves You Now; Kathy Troccoli – Heart And Soul	
1986	Amy Grant	United States	Unguarded	Debby Boone – Choose Life; Sandi Patty – Hymns Just for You; Leslie Phillips – Black and White in a Grey World; Sheila Walsh – Don't Hide Your Heart	
1987	Sandi Patty	United States	Morning Like This	Cynthia Clawson – Immortal; Teri DeSario – Voices In The Wind; Sheila Walsh – Shadowlands; Deniece Williams – "So Glad I Know"	
1988	Deniece Williams	United States	"I Believe In You"	Debby Boone – "The Name Above All Names"; Terri Gibbs – Turn Around; Debbie McClendon – Count It All Joy; Kathy Troccoli – Images	
1989	Amy Grant	United States	Lead Me On	Margaret Becker – The Reckoning; Sandi Patty – "Almighty God"; Deniece Williams – "Do You Hear What I Hear?"; Delores Winans – "Precious Is The Name"	
1990	CeCe Winans	United States	"Don't Cry"	Margaret Becker – Immigrant's Daughter; Debby Boone - Be Thou My Vision; Amy Grant – "'Tis So Sweet To Trust In Jesus"; Sandi Patty – "Forever Friends"; Deniece Williams – "Healing"	

== See also ==
- List of music awards honoring women
