= 16th GMA Dove Awards =

1985 US music awards ceremony

- Date: 1985
- Location: Nashville, Tennessee

The 16th Annual GMA Dove Awards were held on 1985 recognizing accomplishments of musicians for the year 1984. The show was held in Nashville, Tennessee.

== Award recipients ==
- Song of the Year
  - "Upon This Rock"; Gloria Gaither, Dony McGuire; Gaither Music, lt's-N-Me Music, Lexicon Music (ASCAP)
- Songwriter of the Year
  - Michael W. Smith
- Male Vocalist of the Year
  - Steve Green
- Female Vocalist of the Year
  - Sandi Patti
- Artist of the Year
  - Sandi Patti
- Southern Gospel Album of the Year
  - The Best Of And A Whole Lot More; Rex Nelon Singers; Ken Harding; Canaan
- Inspirational Album of the Year
  - Songs from the Heart; Sandi Patti; Greg Nelson, Sandi Patti Helvering; Impact
- Pop/Contemporary Album of the Year
  - Straight Ahead; Amy Grant; Brown Bannister; Myrrh Records
- Contemporary Gospel Album of the Year (formerly Contemporary Black Gospel)
  - No Time To Lose; Andrae Crouch; Bill Maxwell; Light
- Traditional Gospel Album of the Year (formerly Traditional Black Gospel)
  - Sailin'; Shirley Caesar; Sanchez Harley, Shirley Caesar, David Lehman; Myrrh
- Instrumentalist
  - Phil Driscoll
- Praise and Worship Album of the Year
  - The Praise In Us; Neal Joseph; Myrrh
- Children's Music Album of the Year
  - Ten New Songs With Kids For Kids About Life; Ron W. Griffin; Word
- Musical Album
  - The Race Is On; Steve Taylor; Word
- Recorded Music Packaging of the Year
  - Eddie Yip; Stan Evenson; Don Putnam; Kingdom Of Love; Scott Wesley Brown
- Album by a Secular Artist
  - You Were Loving Me; Lulu Roman Smith; Gary McSpadden; Canaan
