= Sue Dodge =

American southern gospel singer

- Born: Sue Ellen Chenault; Little Rock, Arkansas, U.S.
- Genre: Southern gospel
- Occupation: Singer

Sue Dodge is an American singer of southern gospel music who has performed in 18 countries.

== Early years ==
Sue Dodge was born Sue Ellen Chenault in Little Rock, Arkansas. She was the only daughter and the youngest of three children. Her father worked for Alcoa, and her mother was a stay-at-home mom. Her parents encouraged her interest in music, and she sang a solo on television at age 5. She became a Christian when she was in the fifth grade, and she sang and played piano at a church where her brother was pastor. When she was 16, she sang daily with The Miller Trio on television station KATV in Little Rock.

in 1968, Dodge won the Miss Benton beauty pageant and the Miss Congeniality title in the Miss Arkansas competition.

== Career ==
Dodge began her career in southern gospel music in 1969 when, at age 19, she joined The Downings. After 18 months with that group, she began singing with the Speer Family. During Dodge's early days with the Speers, she lived with them and considered them family. Years later, she said: "Brock Speer was like a daddy to me." While she sang with the Speers, she was named Female Vocalist of the Year four times in Dove Award competition. She also was inducted into the Gospel Music Hall of Fame as a member of the Speer Family.

After her marriage in 1974, Dodge left the Speers to be with her evangelist husband. She sang backup vocals at Rainbow Sound Studios in Dallas, Texas, and did occasional concerts. She also was a member of the Gospel Music Association's board of directors.

In 1979, Dodge and her husband founded Capital Church in Washington, D.C. She directed the church's women's ministry, planned the music, and often sang and played the piano for worship services. By 2019, they had retired from pastoring that church, and she was traveling with a full-time ministry. Throughout her career, she has performed in 18 countries. Venues where she has performed include Kennedy Center in Washington, D.C., the Music Hall in Aberdeen, Westminster Hall in London, and Carnegie Hall in New York City.

In the 1990s, Dodge began performing in Gaither Homecoming activities, balancing the time for those recordings and concerts with her responsibilities at Capital Church and with her family.

In addition to the Gaither Homecoming programs, Dodge has appeared on other TV shows including The 700 Club and In Touch with Dr. Charles Stanley. She released her first DVD, The Best of Sue Dodge, in 2010. It combines the story of her life with some of her Homecoming performances. She has recorded more than 15 albums, including the CDs Let Me Tell You About Jesus and Faithful.

== Personal life ==
In 1974, she married Amos Dodge. They have one daughter. Early in their marriage, he was an evangelist, and they lived in Hurst, Texas.
