= Scott Wesley Brown =

American CCM singer and songwriter

- Born: Scott Wesley Brown; June 4, 1952 (age 73); Philadelphia, Pennsylvania, U.S.
- Occupations: Musician; singer; songwriter; producer; –
- Years active: 1974–2022
- Musical career
- Genres: Jesus music, contemporary Christian music
- Instruments: Vocals, guitar
- Labels: Georgetown; Newpax; Sparrow; Integrity/Hosanna! Music

Scott Wesley Brown (born June 4, 1952) is an American CCM singer and songwriter. He has recorded 25 albums and toured in over 50 countries.

== Biography ==
Brown was born in Philadelphia, Pennsylvania. He recorded for Sparrow Records for much of his career, releasing 25 albums; his songs have been covered by other Christian artists – including Petra, Pat Boone, Bruce Carroll, Sandi Patty, and Amy Grant – and by opera star Plácido Domingo. Brown has also worked with organizations such as Promise Keepers and Campus Crusade for Christ, and was a worship pastor in San Diego.

Brown toured extensively internationally in over 50 countries. Before recording songs and touring with dozens of artists, he met Steve Camp, then an unknown artist fresh out of high school, who would join Scott under the artist management of Larry Norman, who mentored both of them.

Scott Wesley Brown has worked closely with the U.S. Center for World Mission and ACMC (Advancing Churches in Missions Commitment), and has taught many worship and mission seminars. He received his ordination from the Southern Baptist Convention in 1998 but continued his seminary education through Phoenix and Westminster seminaries.

Brown teamed up with Billy Smiley of the Christian rock band Whiteheart to produce a series of albums of contemporary hymn arrangements. Hymns, The Old Made New was released in 2006.

== Discography ==
Scott Wesley Brown

- Released: 1974
- Label: Georgetown
- Tracks: "Sing, Singing His Song", "Harrison", "Sonshine", "And I Feel", "Good News", "Battle Cry", "Noah's Ark", "Waiting for the Spring", "In His Hands", "When I'm With You"

I Am a Christian

- Released: 1976
- Label: Newpax
- Tracks: "Rejoice", "Excuses", "The Lone Ranger", "He Has Returned", "Super Star", "I Am A Christian", "Walk Your Talk", "I Love You", "Ride The Wild Horses", "Love One Another"

I'm Not Religious, I Just Love the Lord

- Released: 1977
- Label: Sparrow
- Tracks: "I'm Not Religious, I Just Love The Lord", "House at Pooh Corner", "I Wish You Jesus", "It's So Nice", "Learning", "Dance", "Friend", "Once Again", "Please", "Letting Go"

Songs and Stories

- Released: 1978
- Label: Seven Locks

One Step Closer

- Released: 1979
- Label: Sparrow
- Tracks: "This Is The Day", "One Step Closer", "Mountains", "Pressing On", "Jesus Is The Lord of My Life", "Pray For Me", "Consider The Lilies", "How Can I Say I Love You", "You Make It Look So Easy", "Praise You in the Rain"

SWB

- Released: 1981
- Label: Sparrow
- Tracks: "Close to You", "My Treasure", "Out on a Limb", "Learning to Live Like Jesus", "Someone's Got a Hold on Me", "This Little Child", "Your Word", "Fall on Me", "Keep the Son in Your Eyes", "The Lord's Prayer"

Signature

- Released: 1982
- Label: Sparrow
- Tracks: "With His Joy", "Feelings", "Workin' Out the Details", "Babe", "It Ain't Magic", "He Will Carry You", "There Is Power", "Just at the Right Time", "You Are the One", "Wise Men"

All My Best

- Released: 1984
- Label: Sparrow

Kingdom of Love

- Released: 1984
- Format: Vinyl and Cassette
- Label: Sparrow
- Tracks: "Yeshua Ha Mashiach", "Kingdom of Love", "Stronger", "Give Your Life Away", "Jesus I Love You", "Born To Love You", "The Wall", "Peace By Peace", "All Of Us Together", "In Jesus Name"

Somebody's Brother

- Released: 1985
- Label: Sparrow
- Tracks: "Goliath", "Then He Comes", "I Walked Today", "Christ the Lord Is Risen Today", "Somebody's Brother", The Name of Jesus Is Excellent", "When Answers Aren't Enough", "Praise Be to God Our Lord", "The Red Sea Parted", "Above the Storm"

The Language of Jesus is Love

- Released: 1987
- Label: Sparrow
- Tracks: "The Language of Jesus Is Love", "I Stand Here Forgiven", "I Know Jesus", "All Rise", "Count It All Joy", "Where There Is Love", "Mother Teresa", "They've Never Heard of Jesus", "Hungry Eyes"

To the Ends of the Earth

- Released: 1988
- Label: Word
- Tracks: "All Creatures", "Look What God Is Doing", "Things", "Blessed to Be a Blessing", "Please Don't Send Me to Africa", "He Is No Fool", "They That Wait", "My Eyes Have Seen Salvation", "God's People", "Still Another Miracle"

All My Best / The Language of Jesus is Love

- Released: 1988
- Label: Sparrow

Living in the Comfort Zone

- Released: 1990
- Label: Word
- Tracks: "Living in the Comfort Zone", "Window of Time", "Buy Now, Pay Later", "This Is Church", "When the Whole World Knows", "Marvelous", "Whatcha Gonna Do with Your Life", "Oh Joanah", "The Lord Who Loves Us All", "We Are the Dreamers"

The Passionate Pursuit

- Released: 1991
- Label: Word
- Tracks: "Creator", "Tower of Pride", "Through You", "Let My People Go", "Righteous and Holy", "Elohim", "Who Will Stand in the Gap", "Your Name", "Yet Still", "Into the World", "Our Hearts Will Burn"

Through the Years

- Released: 1993

The Scott Wesley Brown Collection: A Library of 35 Favorite Songs

- Released: 1995
- Label: Sparrow

Mission of Praise

- Released: 1995
- Label: Integrity/Hosanna! Music/Sparrow

More Like You

- Released: 1998

Out of Africa

- Released: 1998

A Heart For You: A Worship Collection

- Released: 2003

Let the Nations Rejoice

- Released: 2004

Old Hymns Made New

- Released: 2005

Songs from the Valley

- Released: 2011
