= The Edge of the Divine =

Studio album by Sandi Patty
- Released: August 24, 2010
- Recorded: 2010
- Genre: Contemporary Christian music; gospel
- Label: Stylos
- Producer: Chance Scoggins; Sandi Patty; Anna Trent

Sandi Patty chronology
Christmas Live (2009)	The Edge of the Divine (2010)	Broadway Stories (2011)

Singles from The Edge of the Divine
- 1. "When Life Gets Broken" Released: August 19, 2010

The Edge of the Divine is a studio album released by Christian singer Sandi Patty.

== Critical reception ==
Reviews of the album were positive. Today's Christian Music, powered by CCM Magazine, praised the album's music style, and for "venturing into introspective lyrical territory, which is further traced throughout her companion book of the same name." In Christianity Today, Andrew Greer wrote that "Aside from two classically-based tracks, Chance Scoggins (Addison Road, Mandisa) produces a surprisingly hip musical aura for the living legend Sandi Patty, proving that Patty's still versatile and relevant even after thirty years in the biz."

== Commercial performance ==
On May 21, 2011, The Edge of the Divine peaked at No. 30 on the Billboard Christian Albums chart. It also peaked at No. 45 on the Christian & Gospel Album Sales chart.

== Track listing ==
Album release
No.	Title	Writer(s)	Length
1.	"Faith Dancing"	Gwen Smith; Sue Smith; Barry Weeks	3:23
2.	"The Edge of the Divine"	Shannon J. Wexelberg	3:43
3.	"Time Like These"	Ian Eskelin; Barry Weeks; Tony Wood	3:04
4.	"When Life Gets Broken (featuring Heather Payne)"	Matt Hybarger; Michael O'Brien	5:04
5.	"Worthy"	Jeremy Bose; Marc Byrd; Sarah Hart	4:21
6.	"Makes Me Wanna Pray"	Christina Aguilera; Kara DioGuardi; Rich Harrison; Steve Winwood	4:12
7.	"All to Bring You Glory"	Ronnie Freeman; Barry Weeks	5:02
8.	"A Mighty Fortress Is Our God"	Martin Luther	5:45
9.	"We Shall Behold Him"	Dottie Rambo	5:26
10.	"My Prayer For You"	Shelley Jennings	4:17
Total length:			44:17

== Awards ==
The album won a Dove Award for Inspirational Album in 2011.

== Charts ==
Chart performance for The Edge of the Divine
Chart (2011)	Peak position
US Christian Albums (Billboard)	30
