= Lanny Wolfe =

American Christian music songwriter

- Born: February 2, 1942 (age 84); Columbus, Ohio, U.S.
- Genre: Gospel
- Occupations: Singer, songwriter, musician
- Instruments: Vocals, keyboards, guitar, piano
- Years active: 1963–present
- Website: paradigmmusic.net

Lanny Wolfe (born February 2, 1942) is an American Christian music songwriter, musician, music publisher, and music educator. He has written over seven hundred songs and fourteen musicals, and has recorded over seventy projects. He won two GMA Dove Awards in 1984, for Song of the Year and Songwriter of the Year, for his song, "More Than Wonderful," a song whose recording by Sandi Patti and Larnelle Harris earned them a Grammy Award. Wolfe has written over sixty Christmas songs included in eight Christmas musicals, including "Rejoice with Exceeding Great Joy," "No Room," "Cherish That Name," "Wise Men Still Seek Him," "For God So Loved the World," and "Seeking for Me." "Rejoice with Exceeding Great Joy" is used yearly in the candle lighting ceremony at Epcot in Orlando, Florida. Wolfe's song, "Greater Is He" was used as the official closing song of the Oral Roberts Telecast which aired on 120 stations weekly for six years. His song "For God So Loved the World" was selected to be recorded by the James Cleveland's Gospel Music Workshop of America in Houston, TX in 1982, where Wolfe directed the 1500-voice gospel choir. It was also included in the Gospel Music Workshop of America's 25th Anniversary CD project; and, for the 30th anniversary of the Gospel Music Workshop of America, was chosen as one of the top five songs that had been recorded out of 450 songs from the workshop's thirty-year run. He has also been a member of the board of directors of the Gospel Music Association.

== Biography ==
Wolfe was born in Columbus, Ohio. He learned how to play the piano by ear, a talent that was used in his local church as he was growing up. He went to Ohio State University, received his baccalaureate degree in business education, and began teaching in public schools. Going to night school, he finished his MBA there as well.

Being a talented church musician, he was offered a job at a Pentecostal Bible school in California to teach worship music – which led him to return to a traditional learning atmosphere where he eventually received his bachelor's degree in Music Education from San Jose State University. He eventually finished a second Master's in the same field.

He headed the music departments at the following Bible schools affiliated with the United Pentecostal Church International: Christian Life College in Stockton, California from 1965 to 1966; Gateway College of Evangelism in St. Louis, Missouri from 1968 to 1974; and at Jackson College of Ministries in Jackson, Mississippi from 1974 to 1993.

Since 1993, Wolfe was a music instructor at South Texas Bible Institute, also in Houston, Texas and Director of Music/Worship Pastor for churches in Texas, Florida, and Indiana. Wolfe is CEO for Paradigm Music Productions, writing, conducting choir clinics at churches across the country and accompanying members of the original Lanny Wolfe Trio for reunion concerts at selected churches and venues throughout the nation. Starting in 2015, Wolfe and The Lanny Wolfe Trio has made frequent appearances on the Three Angels Broadcasting Network, based in West Frankfort, IL and airing on 120 stations around the world. Wolfe was vitally involved in the creation of the 3ABN project "Calvary" featuring six of Lanny's songs, three of which were new and co-writes. The project premiered live on the networks' 120 stations, June, 2015 from West Frankfort, IL.

== Influence on gospel music ==
Wolfe is a pioneer in progressing modern church music in Pentecostal and Charismatic churches from traditional hymns or folk-style singing to more sophisticated worship styles with arranged or pre-recorded music, using styles of music influenced by pop-culture and black gospel music.

Though he heavily influenced the greater world of gospel music during the 1970s and 1980s, it was through his work within his own particular religious denomination, the United Pentecostal Church International, that this work was accomplished. While people throughout Christianity may be able to hum a Lanny Wolfe tune, most of his day-to-day career was spent as the Dean of the School of Music at a Pentecostal Bible school, Jackson College of Ministries.

Through his discography and the National Music Ministry Conference, Wolfe was influential in his genre. He utilized a mix of various styles like southern gospel, traditional, and classical, he played an integral part in elevating the type and styles of music performed in worship services in the United Pentecostal Church and among many other Christian congregations.

Wolfe's original music was performed and released by his trio, the Lanny Wolfe Trio, originally composed of himself, his then-wife, Marietta Wolfe, and Dave Petersen. During the 1980s, the group added others as Dave Petersen departed, followed by his wife who left to raise their children. Eventually, the group performed as Lanny Wolfe and the Lanny Wolfe Trio – the trio itself comprising young talent mostly taken from the student body of the Jackson College of Ministries. His last three albums listed the troupe simply as The Lanny Wolfe Singers. On his last album, the "Singers" were from a local church where he ministered at, since he was no longer affiliated with JCM.

He founded the National Music Ministry Conference (NMMC) as an effort to improve worship music in churches within the United Pentecostal Church, although its influence eventually expanded outside of that denomination. Each annual conference, held in the spring, offered classes in the many aspects of church worship, musicianship, sound control and production, and taught ordinary church musicians important tools in creating a professional sound in church worship. Each conference was capped at the end of the week by the performance of the National Music Ministry Conference Mass Choir (later dubbed Jackson Mass Choir) – made up of participants in the conference, and notable musicians and singers from within the United Pentecostal Church. It was considered an honor among UPCI musical artists to be asked to perform by Wolfe during this concert. Songs made popular by these Mass Choir concerts were often copied by worship teams in the UPCI, charismatic, and other Pentecostal-style churches coast-to-coast. These recordings also brought to the attention of other worship leaders of different faiths this music that Wolfe was introducing to the Pentecostal/Charismatic community – some songs presented there would invariably end up being recorded by more prestigious artists or choirs, such as the Brooklyn Tabernacle Choir.

== Music style ==
Like his method of musical contribution, music styles attributed to Lanny Wolfe were also varied. His original music picked up on styles within pop culture, and often included the soft, symphonic style of pop music during the 1970s. In his song, I Feel Good, he even pulled off adapting a little bit of the "James Brown Sound" to that up-tempo song. His trio often recorded using London-based orchestras, often arranged by the famed gospel music producer, Lari Goss.

Music at his conference, except for a few select songs, was not original to him. He busily mined other non-mainstream gospel genres for material, often using music recorded by gospel choirs (such as Mississippi Mass Choir, or Rev. Milton Brunson and the Thompson Community Singers) for material. The spirited style of these songs went over well in a denomination known for expressive worship and spiritual dance, which seemed a bit odd considering that many congregations within the United Pentecostal Church at that time were all-white or nearly all-white. The mixture was ingenious, and a natural fit, since the expressive worship styles of white Pentecostals themselves were inherited from the beginnings of the Pentecostal movement, which started off as an inner-city, inter-racial religious movement.

His songs, musical style, along with the artistry of the Lanny Wolfe Trio continue to impact Pentecostal/Charismatic worship music since many worship leaders are well adept at finding or creating the same sound. Many Christian recording artists, songwriters, ministers of music, and Christian educators have studied under his leadership, such as Geron Davis ("Standing on Holy Ground"); Vicki Yohe, TBN artist; Vonnie Lopez, artist with the Kurt Carr Singers; Dan Dean, pastor, songwriter and of Phillips, Craig, and Dean; among others.

== Discography ==
Lanny and Marietta Wolfe

- 1963 Song In My Soul "The Wolfe Trio With The Calvary Apostolic Church Choir"
- 1968: Long Road
- 1970: No Valleys Tomorrow

Lanny Wolfe Trio

- 1972: There’s Something in the Air
- 1973: Let's Sing a Song About Jesus
- 1974: Come On, Let’s Praise Him
- 1974: Rejoicing Live
- 1975: Shout It, Jesus is Coming!
- 1976: A Brand New Touch
- 1977: Have A Nice Day
- 1977: An Evening With The Lanny Wolfe Trio
- 1978: Rejoice with Exceeding Great Joy
- 1978: Marietta "Marietta"
- 1979: Make A Joyful Noise
- 1980: Can't Stop the Music
- 1981: Through the Years
- 1982: I Love To Praise Him "Marietta)
- 1983: Lanny Wolfe and The Lanny Wolfe Trio "Behold He Cometh"
- 1988: Together, We Can Make A Difference "Lanny Wolfe and The United Pentecostal Church Artists"
- 1995: Lanny Wolfe Trio 's Greatest Hits
- 2007: Lanny Wolfe Trio's Favorites Vol I (2 CD Set)
- 2008: Lanny Wolfe Trio "A Night To Remember" (2 DVD Set)
- 2009: Lanny Wolfe Trio's Best of LIVE Sessions (2 CD Set)
- 2013: Lanny Wolfe Trio Someone Is Praying For You "Songs of Hope And Encouragement)
- 2014: Marietta "NMMC Mass Choir Favorites Featuring Marietta" 2 CD Set
- 2015: A Lanny Wolfe Christmas "Best of Lanny Wolfe Christmas Songs" (2 CD Set)
- 2016: Lanny Wolfe Trio Favorites Vol II (2 CD Set)
- 2016: A Merry Christmas Evening With The Lanny Wolfe Trio
- 2017: Lanny Wolfe Anthology (2 CD Set)
- 2024: Eighty Favorite Lanny Wolfe Songs in 80 min. CD
- 2026: Lanny Wolfe Trio Fan Favorites CD

Lanny Wolfe and the Lanny Wolfe Trio

- 1984: I’m Gonna Praise the Lord (Anyway That I Can)
- 1986: Children of Azusa Street

The Lanny Wolfe Singers

- 1990: Just Keep Praising Him
- 2000: Never Have To Say Goodbye Again

National Music Ministry Conference Mass Choir

- NMMC Mass Choir Favorites Vol I (2 CD Set) (#80102)
- NMMC Mass Choir Favorites Vol II (#80202)
- NMMC Mass Choir Favorites Vol III (#80302)
- 1976: 1st Annual NMMC Mass Choir Concert ’76 (2 CD set) (#80502)
- 1976: 1st Annual NMMC Tribute To Pentecostal Songwriters ’76 (#80402)
- 1977: 2nd Annual NMMC Mass Choir Concert ’77 (2 CD set) (#80602)
- 1978: 3rd Annual NMMC Mass Choir Concert ’78 (2 CD set) (#80702)
- 1979: 4th Annual NMMC Mass Choir Concert ’79 (2 CD set) (#80802)
- 1980: 5th Annual NMMC Mass Choir Concert ’80 (2 CD set) (#80902)
- 1981: 6th Annual NMMC Mass Choir Concert ’81 (2 CD set) (#81002)
- 1982: 7th Annual NMMC Mass Choir Concert ’82 (2 CD set) (#81102)
- 1983: 8th Annual NMMC Mass Choir Concert ’83 (2 CD set) (#81202)
- 1984: 9th Annual NMMC Mass Choir Concert ’84 (2 CD set) (#81302)
- 1985: 10th Annual NMMC Mass Choir Concert ’85 (2 CD set) (#81402)
- 1986: 11th Annual NMMC Mass Choir Concert ’86 (2 CD set) (#81502)
- 1987: 12th Annual NMMC Mass Choir Concert ’87 (2 CD set) (#81602)
- 1988: 13th Annual NMMC Mass Choir Concert ’88 (2 CD set) (#81702)
- 1989: 14th Annual NMMC Mass Choir Concert ’89 (2 CD set) (#81802)
- 1990: 15th Annual NMMC Mass Choir Concert ’90 (2 CD set) (#81902)
- 1991: 16th Annual NMMC Mass Choir Concert ’91 (2 CD set) (#82002)
- 1993: 18th Annual NMMC Mass Choir Concert ’93 (#82202)

== Musicals (compositions) ==
- 1977: "Surely the Presence of the Lord" - Lanny Wolfe
- 1977: Greater Is He - Lanny Wolfe, Don Marsh, Bob Benson
- 1979: Noel, Jesus Is Born
- 1982: Thou Shall Call His Name Jesus!
- 1984: Love Found A Way!
- 1986: We Are The Church
- 1986: Behold He Cometh! - Lanny Wolfe, John Coates
- 1986: In Everything Give Thanks - Lanny Wolfe, Lari Goss
- 1989: Sing Noel! - Lanny Wolfe, Don Marsh
- 1991: Don't Miss Christmas - Lanny Wolfe, Don Hart
- 1991: Praise The Lamb - Lanny Wolfe, Don Marsh
- 1993: Jesus, The Heart Of Christmas - Lanny Wolfe, Lari Goss
- 1994: Jesus, We Crown You With Praise
- 1997: A Season, A Savior, A Star
- 1999: The Greatest Story - Lanny Wolfe, Lari Goss
- 2002: Together, We Can Make A Difference - Lanny Wolfe, Russell Mauldin

== Awards and honors ==
- 1975: SESAC's Gospel Composer of The Year
- 1976: SESAC's Gospel Composer of The Year
- 1977: Lanny Wolfe Trio received Billboard's Magazine Award of the Year for Top Contemporary Trio
- Nominated eight times by the Gospel Music Association for Gospel Songwriter of the Year
- 1984: GMA Dove Award for Gospel Songwriter of the Year
- 1984: GMA Dove Award for Song of the Year – "More Than Wonderful"
- 2024 Tribute from Kim Collingsworth “His Gift, My Story” presentation, Fisher Auditorium, Nashville, TN, released 2026.
- 2026 Absolutely Gospel Music Association, Columbia, TN, May 5,2026 Cornerstone Award Presented to Lanny Wolfe for his five-decade contribution to Christian music, penning over 700 songs and pioneering contemporary arrangements in church music.
