= Claire Cloninger =

American songwriter, author, and speaker (1942–2019)

- Born: August 12, 1942; Lafayette, Louisiana, U.S.
- Died: August 15, 2019 (aged 77); Fairhope, Alabama, U.S.
- Occupations: Songwriter, author, speaker
- Spouse: Robert Cloninger
- Children: 2
- Awards: 6 GMA Dove Awards

Claire Cloninger (August 12, 1942 – August 15, 2019) was an American songwriter of contemporary Christian music, author and speaker. She (co-)wrote hundreds of songs, including "You Gave Me Love When Nobody Gave Me A Prayer" with Archie Jordan for B. J. Thomas, "Friend of a Wounded Heart" for Wayne Watson (who was also a co-writer), and songs for Sandi Patty and Paul Overstreet. She authored 18 books, including Making ‘I Do’ Last a Lifetime, Dear Abba: Finding the Father’s Heart Through Prayer, and Postcards for People Who Hurt. She won six Dove Awards from the Gospel Music Association.
