= Billy Sprague =

American singer and songwriter

- Born: July 17, 1952 (age 72); Tulsa, Oklahoma, U.S.
- Genres: Contemporary Christian
- Occupation: Singer
- Years active: 1984–present

Billy Sprague (born July 17, 1952) is an American Christian pop singer, songwriter, and producer.

Sprague was born in Tulsa, Oklahoma, to William Sprague and Oteka (Barnes) Sprague. He was raised in Borger, Texas. He attended Texas Christian University, graduating in 1979, then studied English in a Master's program at the University of Texas. Starting in 1981 he played in Amy Grant's backup band, and also embarked on a songwriting career. His compositions would be recorded by Brown Bannister, Gary Chapman, Sandi Patty, Bebe and Cece Winans, Kathy Troccoli, and Debby Boone.

He began recording under his own name in 1984, releasing an album, What a Way To Go, produced by Michael W. Smith. A second album, Serious Fun, followed in 1986, featuring production by Wayne Kirkpatrick and a song co-written by Chris Rodriguez. Sprague ceased recording and performing in 1989 after his fiancé was killed in a car crash while driving to one of his concerts, not returning until 1992. During this time he continued working as a producer, and produced the album Friends Forever Part 2, which won a Dove Award for Best Musical Album in 1990. Switching to Benson Records, Sprague released Torn Between Two Worlds in 1992 and The Wind and the Wave in 1993. In 1994, he married, and continued songwriting through the decade of the 1990s.

In 2015, Sprague released a new album, Songs In The Key Of Awe, after a successful fundraising campaign on Kickstarter.

In 2024, Sprague launched a web site, www.billysprague.com, for books and new or out-of-print music not available on any streaming platforms.

== Discography ==
- What a Way to Go (Reunion Records, 1984)
- Serious Fun (Reunion, 1986)
- La Vie (Reunion, 1988)
- I Wish (Reunion, 1989)
- Torn Between Two Worlds (Benson Records, 1992)
- The Wind and the Wave (Benson, 1993)
- Soundtrack of My Soul (Mission Music, 2004)
- Songs to a Grieving Heart (2005, companion to book)
- Songs In The Key Of Awe (Independent, 2015)
- Hope Rope (Independent, 2024)

== Books ==
=== Nonfiction ===
- Ice Cream as a Clue to the Meaning of the Universe (2000)
- Letter to a Grieving Heart (2001)
- Is God Really There? And is He Good (2002)
- Sacred vs. Shinola: Letters to my children from the kitchen table (2024)

=== Fiction ===
- Music City Mayhymn (2023)
- Untamable (2023)

=== For children ===
- A Friend Should Be Drastic, Gymnastic, but Most of All, Elastic (1990)
- A Friend Should Be Radical, Fanatical, but Most of All, Mathematical (1990)
- A Friend Should Be Athletic, Poetic, but Most of All, Magnetic (1990)
- A Friend Should Be a Magician, a Physician, but Mostly Fond O' Fishin' (1990)
