= Wayne Watson =

- Born: October 5, 1954 (age 71); Wisner, Louisiana, U.S.
- Genres: Contemporary Christian, inspirational
- Occupations: Singer, songwriter
- Instruments: Voice, guitar, piano
- Years active: 1978–present
- Website: waynewatson.com

Wayne Watson (born October 5, 1954) is an American singer-songwriter in contemporary Christian music. Some of his songs have become CCM classics, including "Another Time, Another Place", "For Such a Time as This", "Friend of a Wounded Heart", "People of God", "Touch of the Master's Hand", "New Lives for Old", "Watercolour Ponies", and from his 1998 album The Way Home "Here in This Town". He has won eight GMA Dove Awards. He was born in Wisner, Louisiana, United States.

== Career history ==
Watson originally planned to pursue a career playing baseball, but while in college he began dabbling in music, and after graduation regularly performed in area churches. While leading worship at a Christian youth camp, the father of one of the children videotaped Watson's performance and sent it to a record company.

Watson produced 23 No. 1 singles in Christian radio—including "Friend of a Wounded Heart", "When God's People Pray", "Almighty", "Be in Her Eyes", "Watercolour Ponies", "More of You", "Another Time, Another Place", and "Home Free" (which became the most played song on Christian radio in 1991).

His career credits include a dozen Dove Awards wins, including Male Vocalist of the Year in 1989, Song of the Year in that same year ("Friend of a Wounded Heart"), Pop Contemporary Song of the Year and Contemporary Album of The Year (1988) for Watercolour Ponies, and Pop/Contemporary Song of the Year (1992) for "Home Free". He has been nominated for two Grammy Awards, for Best Male Gospel Performance in 1988 for Watercolour Ponies, and for Best Pop Gospel Album in 1993 for A Beautiful Place.

In the 1990s, he performed "Another Time, Another Place" with fellow artist Sandi Patty on NBC-TV's The Tonight Show—an event that was deemed a defining moment in Christian music's move to wider audiences. In the late 1990s, his "For Such a Time as This" became a centerpiece theme of the CBS-TV series Touched by an Angel.

Watson is retired after many years of serving as the associate director of music at Chapelwood United Methodist Church in Houston, Texas.

On January 1, 2011, Watson was among seven artists inducted into the Christian Music Hall of Fame.

== Discography ==
=== Albums ===
| Year | Album | US Christian | Record label | Record Producer |
|---|---|---|---|---|
| 1978 | Canvas For The Sun | | Milk & Honey | |
| 1980 | Workin' in the Final Hour | | Milk & Honey | Greg Nelson |
| 1982 | New Lives for Old | | Milk & Honey | Wayne Watson, Brian Tankersley |
| 1984 | Man in the Middle | | Milk & Honey | Wayne Watson, Brian Tankersley |
| 1985 | Giants in the Land | 22 | DaySpring | Wayne Watson, Scott Hendricks |
| 1987 | Watercolour Ponies | 11 | DaySpring | Paul Mills, Wayne Watson |
| 1988 | The Fine Line | 13 | Word/Epic | Paul Mills, Wayne Watson |
| 1990 | Home Free | 7 | Word/Epic | Paul Mills, Wayne Watson |
| 1992 | How Time Flies | | Word/DaySpring | |
| 1993 | A Beautiful Place | 10 | DaySpring | Greg Nelson, Wayne Watson |
| 1994 | One Christmas Eve | 10 | Word | Greg Nelson, Wayne Watson |
| 1995 | Field of Souls | 21 | Warner Alliance | Michael Omartian, David Pack, Wayne Watson |
| 1998 | The Way Home | 8 | Word/Epic | Michael Omartian |
| 2000 | Wayne Watson | 36 | Word | Michael Omartian, Jerry McPherson |
| 2002 | Living Room | 6 | Spring Hill/Word | Neal Watson |
| 2007 | Even This | | Infinity Entertainment | |
| 2008 | King of Kings (Christmas project) | | indie | Jeremy Good, Wayne Watson |
| 2016 | Simple Life | | indie | |

=== Official compilations ===
- 1985: Best of Wayne Watson (Milk & Honey)
- 1991: The Early Works (Benson)
- 1992: How Time Flies (Word)
- 1995: The Very Best (Word)
- 1999: Signature Songs (Greentree)
- 2004: Signatures (Spring Hill)
- 2007: The Definitive Collection (Word)

=== Appearances on other albums ===
- 1985: An Evening in December; First Call & Friends (Word-A&M)
- 1985: Together We Will Stand; We Will Stand; a Continental Singers project (Christian Artists Records)
- 1989: Our Hymns (Word) "It Is Well with My Soul"
- 1990: Another Time...Another Place; Sandi Patti (Word) (title song)
- 1990: Handel's Young Messiah (Word) "He Was Despised"
- 1991: Live with Friends; Brooklyn Tabernacle Choir (Word) "Almighty"
- 1991: The New Young Messiah; (Sparrow) "Comfort Ye My People"
- 1994: Saviour: Story of God's Passion for His People; (Word) "Man of Sorrows"
- 1995: Christmas Carols of the Young Messiah; (Sparrow) "Angels Medley"
- 1996: Tribute – The Songs of Andraé Crouch; (Warner Alliance) "Through It All"
- 1997: Sing Me to Sleep, Daddy; (Brentwood Kids Company) (title song)
- 1999: Touched by an Angel: The Christmas Album; (Sony) "For Such a Time as This"
- 2000: Child of the Promise original cast recording (Sparrow) "Shepherds Recitative"
- 2002: McPherson 1: Sunset Drive (Autumn Productions) "Watercolor Ponies" (guitar instrumental)

== Video ==
- 1987: Wayne Watson in Concert (Dayspring)
- 1994: The New Young Messiah (Sparrow)
- 1994: It's Time (Word Visual)
- 1995: Christmas Carols of the Young Messiah (Chordant)

== Awards ==
Dove Awards

- 1988: Pop/Contemporary Album of the Year: Watercolour Ponies
- 1989: Song of the Year: "Friend of a Wounded Heart"
- 1989: Male Vocalist of the Year
- 1992: Pop/Contemporary Song of the Year: "Home Free"
- 1992: Short Form Music Video of the Year: "Another Time, Another Place"
- 1997: Special Event Album of the Year: Tribute – The Songs of Andrae Crouch (various artists)
- 1998: Children's Music Album of the Year: Sing Me to Sleep Daddy (various artists)
