= Larnelle Harris =

American musician (born 1947)

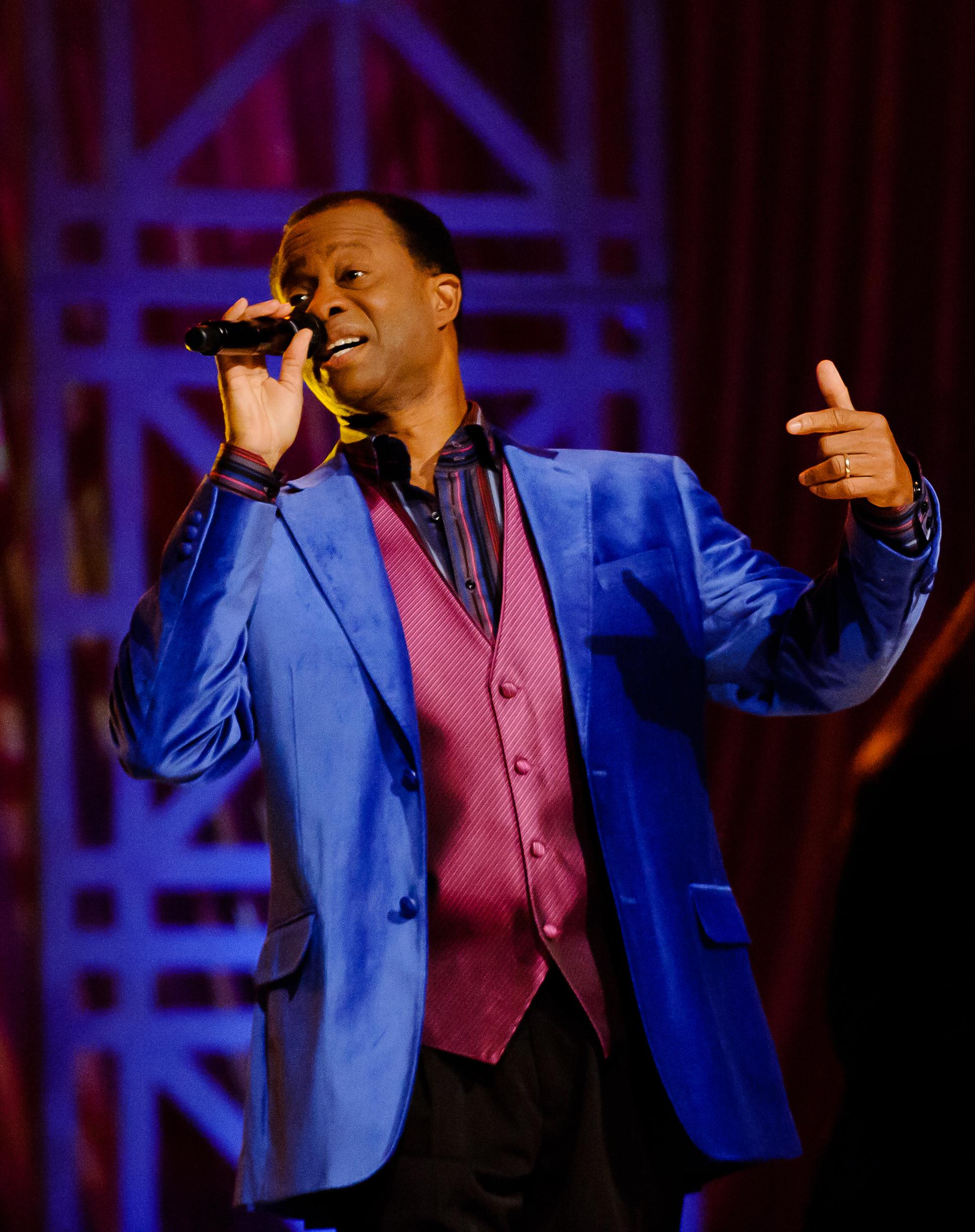
- Harris in performance, 2012

Background information
- Born: Larnelle Steward Harris; July 11, 1947 (age 79); Danville, Kentucky, U.S.
- Genres: Gospel, contemporary Christian
- Occupations: Singer, Tenor
- Instruments: Vocals, saxophone, drums
- Years active: 1969–present
- Website: larnelle.com

Larnelle Steward Harris (born July 11, 1947) is an American gospel singer and songwriter. During his multiple decades of ministry, Harris has recorded 22 albums, won five Grammy Awards and 11 Dove Awards, and has had several number one songs on the inspirational music charts. Known for his classically trained tenor voice blended with the expressive power of Black Gospel, he has been a major presence in contemporary Christian music for more than fifty years.

== Early life ==
A native of Danville, Kentucky, Harris started playing the drums at the age of nine. His first formal vocal training came when he attended college at Western Kentucky University, from which he graduated. Harris then became a part of the popular gospel touring group The Spurrlows (beginning as drummer). Harris grew up in a Black family shaped by faith, hardship, music, and perseverance. His parents, Oscar Harris Jr. and Ida “May” Dodd Harris, taught him discipline, prayer, and trust in God, even while living through the racial tensions and segregation of the 1950s and 1960s. Though he experienced the painful realities of racism, Harris was not raised to hate, but to live with wisdom, dignity, and faith. His mother's prayers and the influence of church helped shape his heart, while his musical gift was discovered early as a boy soprano. Over time, Harris came to see his voice not merely as talent, but as a gift from God to proclaim grace, hope, forgiveness, and the love of Jesus Christ.

== Music ==
=== Formative years and the "Year of Silence" ===
Harris began playing piano at age nine and later studied drums. After graduating from Western Kentucky University in 1969, he toured as a drummer with the gospel group The Spurrlows. He later fronted the jazz-funk band First Gear, releasing First Gear (1972) and Caution! Steep Hill Use First Gear (1974).

At the start of his solo ascent, Harris developed vocal nodules due to chronic overuse and a grueling tour schedule. This diagnosis forced him into a full year of complete vocal rest, during which he was unable to speak or sing, relying on a pen and notepad to communicate. This "year of silence" was a profound spiritual turning point; he shifted from relying on his natural talent to a deep, abiding trust in God. He credits this period with providing the spiritual maturity that sustained his subsequent decades of success.

=== Solo discography and major milestones ===
Harris launched his solo career in 1975, yielding 19 number-one radio singles.

==== Solo albums ====
Tell It To Jesus (1975), More (1977), Free (1978), Give Me More Love in My Heart (1980), Touch Me Lord (1982), I’ve Just Seen Jesus (1985), From a Servant’s Heart (1986), The Father Hath Provided (1987), Larnelle...Christmas (1988), I Can Begin Again (1989), Larnelle Live...Psalms, Hymns & Spiritual Songs (1990), I Choose Joy (1992), Beyond All the Limits (1994), Unbelievable Love (1995), First Love (1998), A Story to Tell (2000), Pass the Love (2002), I Want to Be a Star (2005), Disturb Us, Lord (2017).

Note: Harris also recorded with the Gaither Vocal Band (1984–1987), appearing on New Point of View (1984) and One X1 (1986).

== Television work ==
Harris has appeared live on television series such as Live with Regis and Kathie Lee, The 700 Club, several Billy Graham crusades, and the Trinity Broadcasting Network. He has appeared on numerous Gaither Homecoming shows, and his own Christmas special. In his hometown of Louisville, Kentucky, Harris has made many appearances on the WHAS Crusade for Children, a long-running local telethon benefitting children's charities.

== Personal life ==
=== Family ===
Harris met his wife, Cynthia (Mitzi), while at Western Kentucky University; they have been married for over 50 years and have two grown children, Lonnie and Teresa. He is a licensed Amateur (Ham) Radio operator (WD4LZC).

=== Current status and community service ===
Today, Harris resides in Louisville, Kentucky. While he does not maintain an active, full-scale solo tour, he remains active through select special performances and private events. His life is currently defined by local service; appointed to the Louisville Metro Housing Authority Board of Commissioners, he serves as the chairman of the committee on Opportunities for Poverty Elimination (COPE), focusing on poverty, housing, and food insecurity in his own community.

== Awards and industry recognition ==
=== Grammy Awards (5 wins) ===
- 1984: Best Gospel Performance, Duo/Group – "More Than Wonderful" (with Sandi Patty)
- 1985: Best Gospel Performance, Duo/Group – "I've Just Seen Jesus" (with Sandi Patty)
- 1985: Best Solo Gospel Performance – "How Excellent Is Thy Name"
- 1988: Best Gospel Performance, Male – The Father Hath Provided
- 1989: Best Gospel Performance, Male – Larnelle...Christmas

=== GMA Dove Awards (11 wins) ===
- 1981: Contemporary Black Gospel Album (Give Me More Love in My Heart)
- 1983: Male Vocalist of the Year; Inspirational Album (Touch Me Lord)
- 1986: Male Vocalist of the Year; Inspirational Album (I’ve Just Seen Jesus)
- 1988: Male Vocalist of the Year; Songwriter of the Year; Inspirational Album (The Father Hath Provided)
- 1992: Inspirational Album (Larnelle Live...)
- 1993: Inspirational Album (Generation 2 Generation)
- 1996: Inspirational Album (Unbelievable Love)

=== Hall of Fame and other honors ===
- Gospel Music Hall of Fame: Inducted as a solo artist (2007) and with the Gaither Vocal Band (2014).
- Kentucky Music Hall of Fame: Inducted in 2011.
- Amateur Radio Hall of Fame: Inducted in 2008 (Call sign: WD4LZC).
- Additional: Stellar Award (1988), WKU Hall of Distinguished Alumni (1993), Silver Bell Award (1991), Kentucky Governor's Award (2014).

== Discography ==
*1975: Tell It To Jesus
- 1977: More
- 1978: Free
- 1980: Give Me More Love In My Heart
- 1982: Touch Me Lord
- 1982: The Best Of Larnelle
- 1985: I've Just Seen Jesus
- 1986: From a Servant's Heart
- 1987: The Father Hath Provided
- 1988: Larnelle...Christmas
- 1989: I Can Begin Again
- 1990: Larnelle Live...Psalms Hymns & Spiritual Songs
- 1992: I Choose Joy
- 1994: Beyond All the Limits
- 1995: Unbelievable Love
- 1995: First Love
- 1998: Larnelle Collector's Series Volume One
- 1998: Larnelle Collector's Series Volume Two
- 2000: A Story to Tell
- 2005: I Want to Be a Star
- 2010: Live In Brooklyn
- 2013: Live In Nashville

=== With the Gaither Vocal Band ===
- 1984: New Point of View
- 1986: One X1
- 2009: Reunion Vol. 1
- 2009: Reunion Vol. 2
- 2019: Reunion Live

=== Appearances on other albums ===
- 1991: Live with Friends The Brooklyn Tabernacle Choir; "I Can Be Glad"
- 1992: Handel's Messiah: A Soulful Celebration
- 1993: The New Young Messiah; "Ev'ry Valley Shall Be Exalted", "Surely He Hath Borne Our Griefs"
- 1994: Promise Keepers: A Life That Shows; "In a Way That Matters"
- 1994: Stories & Songs of Christmas; "Silent Night"
- 1994: Saviour: The Story of God's Passion for His People (with Steve Green, Twila Paris, Wayne Watson, Wintley Phipps)
- 1995: Christmas Carols of the Young Messiah; "Amen"
- 1995: Master Pieces – Classic Songs Made New; "Just A Little Talk With Jesus"
- 1995: Hymns & Voices; "It Is Well with My Soul", "The Lord's Prayer"
- 1996: Emmanuel: A Musical Celebration of the Life of Christ; "Rejoice Emmanuel"
- 1997: God With Us: A Celebration of Christmas Carols & Classics; "Go Tell It on the Mountain"
- 1998: Ralph Carmichael and Friends Live; "Here and Now I Believe"
- 2000: Vestal & Friends, Vol. 2 Vestal Goodman; "The Lamb Has Brought Us Home"

== Video ==
- 1991: Larnelle Live: My Time With You (VHS)
- 1992: I Choose Joy (VHS)
- 1994: Sparrow TV Dinners (VHS) various artists; "Teach Me to Love", duet with Steve Green
- 2002: More Than the Music ...Live (VHS) various artists; "The Lord's Prayer"
- 2005: Timeless: Concert of Faith & Inspiration (various artists)
- 2013: Live in Nashville

=== Gaither Homecoming performances ===
- 1993: A Christmas Homecoming "Amen"
- 1996: Homecoming Texas Style "Amen"
- 1998: Down By The Tabernacle "I Go To The Rock"
- 1999: Kennedy Center Homecoming "America, the Beautiful", "I've Just Seen Jesus" duet with Sandi Patty
- 2002: God Bless America "Jesus Saves"
- 2002: Let Freedom Ring "More Than Wonderful" with Sandi Patty
- 2003: Going Home "Friends in High Places"
- 2004: Dottie Rambo with Homecoming Friends "I Go to the Rock"
- 2004: We Will Stand "Dream On"
- 2005: Israel Homecoming "Amen"
- 2005: Jerusalem Homecoming "I Walked Today Where Jesus Walked"
- 2009: Gaither Vocal Band Reunion Volume 1 "Your First Day in Heaven", "Can't Stop Talking About Him", "A Few Good Men"
- 2009: Gaither Vocal Band Reunion Volume 2 "Dream On", "Build An Ark", "The Love of God"
- 2011: Alaskan Homecoming "How Great Thou Art", "The Star-Spangled Banner"
- 2011: Majesty "Amen", "I've Just Seen Jesus" with Ladye Love Smith
- 2011: Tent Revival Homecoming "I Don't Want to Get Adjusted"
- 2011: The Old Rugged Cross "His Eye Is on the Sparrow"

== Awards and honors ==
=== Grammy Awards ===
- 1983: Best Gospel Performance by Duo or Group for "More Than Wonderful" with Sandi Patty
- 1985: Best Gospel Performance by Duo or Group for "I've Just Seen Jesus" with Sandi Patty
- 1985: Best Solo Gospel Performance for "How Excellent Is Thy Name"
- 1987: Best Gospel Performance, Male for The Father Hath Provided
- 1988: Best Gospel Performance, Male for Larnelle...Christmas

=== GMA Dove Awards ===
- 1981: Contemporary Gospel Album of the Year for Give Me More Love in My Heart
- 1983: Male Vocalist of the Year
- 1983: Inspirational Album of the Year for Touch Me Lord
- 1986: Inspirational Album of the Year for I've Just Seen Jesus
- 1986: Male Vocalist of the Year
- 1988: Songwriter of the Year
- 1988: Male Vocalist of the Year
- 1992: Inspirational Album of the Year for Larnelle Live...Psalms, Hymns & Spiritual Songs
- 1993: Inspirational Album of the Year for Generation 2 Generation
- 1996: Inspirational Album of the Year for Unbelievable Love

Inducted into the Gospel Music Association Foundation Hall of Fame on October 29, 2007

=== Other honors ===
- Silver Bell Award for Distinguished Public Service presented by Ad Council
- Cashbox Magazine Award for Contemporary Gospel Single of the Year for "I Can Begin Again"
- Stellar Award, Best Solo Performance by Male Contemporary for "The Father Hath Provided"
- Singing News Fan Award for Favorite Black Artist
- The Christian Music Hall of Fame (inducted in 2007)
- Western Kentucky University Hall of Distinguished Alumni – Inducted 1993
