= David T. Clydesdale =

American musician

David T. Clydesdale (born 1954) is an American musical artist, songwriter, arranger, and conductor. A recipient of a Grammy Award and Dove Award, he has received five gold record certifications, and one platinum record. Since 1974, he has collaborated with and written songs for notable Christian music artists, such as Steve Green, Sandi Patty, Dottie Rambo, Debby Boone, Dino, Point of Grace, as well as mainstream acts such as the US Army Band Chorus, and Hallmark Card’s Christmas albums. He is perhaps best known for his Christmas musicals, although he has written several Easter musicals as well. He has also created works for Six Flags Amusement Parks and Walt Disney World Productions.
