= Greg Nelson (producer) =

American record producer (born 1948)

Greg Nelson (born September 10, 1948) is a music producer from Nashville.

== Production ==
Nelson has produced 13 gold records and 3 platinum records. He has received 20 Dove Awards as well as over 30 nominations. In addition his productions have garnered 7 Grammy Awards and 13 Grammy nominations for Sandi Patty and Larnelle Harris. He has received song, songwriter and publisher awards from Broadcast Music Incorporated (BMI), the Nashville Songwriters Association and the Gospel Music Association. He received a BMI "Special Contribution Award" in appreciation of his many outstanding contributions to the world of Christian music.

== Songwriting ==
Nelson has written several hymns in The Celebration Hymnal and the Baptist Hymnals. "People Need The Lord", written by Phill McHugh and Nelson, is considered a modern Christian classic. In 1994 with the Nashville-based Christian songwriter Bob Farrell he composed produced and recorded Saviour, described as a modern oratorio or christian musical. It has been toured widely in the US, Europe and Russia.

== Current work ==
Nelson began serving in a dual role at LifeWay Worship in 2004 as an exclusive songwriter and as Creative Supervisor for song and writer development.

== Awards ==
Nelson was inducted into the Gospel Music Hall of Fame in 2018.

== See also ==
- Music row
