= Sandi Patty =

American Christian music singer (born 1956)

- Also known as: Sandi Patti; Sandi Patti Helvering; Sandi Patty; Sandi Patty Peslis
- Born: Sandra Faye Patty; July 12, 1956 (age 70); Oklahoma City, Oklahoma, U.S.
- Genres: Contemporary Christian, Gospel, Inspirational, American Songbook
- Occupations: Singer, author, pianist
- Instruments: Voice, piano
- Years active: 1978–present
- Labels: Milk & Honey, Impact, Word, INO, Stylos, Gaither Music Group
- Spouse: John Helvering (m. 1977; div. 1992) Don Peslis (m. 1995)
- Website: sandipatty.com

Sandra Faye "Sandi" Patty (born July 12, 1956) is an American Christian music singer, known for her wide soprano vocal range and expressive flexibility.

== Biography ==
=== Early life ===
Patty was born in Oklahoma City, Oklahoma, into a family of musicians; her father was a minister of music, and her mother served as the church pianist. She first performed at the age of two when she sang "Jesus Loves Me" for her church, Phoenix First Church of God. First growing up in Phoenix, then San Diego, she and her brothers joined their parents in a performing group known as "The Ron Patty Family", and sang at churches nationwide during summer holidays. After graduating from Crawford High School in San Diego, she attended San Diego State University and Anderson University in Anderson, Indiana, where she studied voice with soprano Greta Dominic, but graduated with an emphasis in conducting. While studying at Anderson University, she worked as a studio musician for area recording studios, singing background vocals and recording commercial jingles, including one for Juicy Fruit gum. Her reputation as a performer and studio singer grew during the late 1970s, and it was during this time that she initiated contact with legendary Christian musician Bill Gaither.

=== Singing career ===
Known as “The Voice”, Sandi Patty is the most awarded female Contemporary Christian Music Artist of all time. Patty recorded her first album, For My Friends, an independent effort, that landed in the hands of executives at Singspiration! records. In 1979, she was signed to Singspiration! and released her first professional record, Sandi's Song. According to the FAQ section on her website, the name on her birth certificate is Sandra Patty. A printer's error on the labeling listed her name as Sandi Patti, and she used this moniker as her stage name for the next fifteen years, before correcting it to Sandi Patty.

Patty's career picked up after she won her first two GMA Dove Awards in 1982 and began singing backup for Bill Gaither and the Bill Gaither Trio. She headlined her first national tour in 1984 and reached national acclaim after her rendition of "The Star-Spangled Banner" was included during the ABC Statue of Liberty re-dedication broadcast on July 6, 1986. This exposure led to multiple mainstream television appearances including The Tonight Show, Christmas in Washington, Walt Disney's Fourth of July Extravaganza, and the 1998 Pepsi 400; the clip was frequently used on television sign-offs for the remainder of their existence. She was invited to sing the national anthem at the Indianapolis 500 in 1987–88, 1990–92, and once again in 2013.

In 1990, Patty's inspirational single release, "I'll Give You Peace", written by Constant Change a.k.a. Dawn Thomas and Thomas Yarbrough, was released on one of her most popular records, entitled, Another Time...Another Place, which peaked at #2 on the Billboard Christian Albums charts. At the peak of her career, Patty's concerts were so heavily attended that she performed in often sold-out mainstream arenas and concert halls across the United States. In the late 1980s and early 1990s, she averaged over 200 concerts a year and supported a staff of over 30 that managed her career. During this period of time Patty was noted as the highest-paid singer in the Christian music industry averaging over $70,000 per appearance, largely due to massive touring and high-profile public appearances.

=== Divorce ===
In 1992, the news of Patty's divorce from manager John Helvering shocked the gospel music industry. Patty and Helvering divorced in 1993 and she married singer Don Peslis in August 1995. During this time, Charles Schulz, whom Patty had previously met through a mutual friend, referenced her in a Peanuts comic strip in a gesture of support. Patty said of the strip, "He just kind of said ... 'I see you, it's okay.'"

=== Comeback ===
Following her remarriage, Patty slowly rebuilt her career by expanding her musical involvement, which included pop concert performances with symphony orchestras such as the New York Symphony Orchestra, Boston Symphony Orchestra, Prague Symphony Orchestra, London Symphony Orchestra, Atlanta Symphony Orchestra, the Cincinnati Pops, and the Dallas Symphony as well as headlining and hosting the Yuletide Celebration with the Indianapolis Symphony Orchestra in 2000, 2002, 2005, 2007, 2010, 2013, and 2015 under the direction of Maestro Jack Everly. Patty again hosted the extravaganza in December 2017, 2021 and 2024.

In both interviews and in her autobiography, Broken on the Back Row, Patty expressed remorse and took full responsibility for her past actions, revealing the steps she took in seeking forgiveness from those that her actions most affected.

In 2000, Patty had a guest singing appearance at the end of a 7th Heaven episode (season 4, episode 20). She appeared in the 2006 annual Macy's Thanksgiving Day Parade in New York. A televised performance of Sandi Patty's Yuletide Special was filmed for syndication in 2006, with other performers—including the Mormon Tabernacle Choir and the U.S. Air Force Reserve Band.

In 2004, Patty was inducted into the Gospel Music Hall of Fame and in 2007 was awarded the GMA Music in the Rockies Summit Award.

In May 2008, Patty released her 30th studio recording, Songs for the Journey, in which she covers classic hymns of the church and other modern gospel classics. 2008 also saw the release of five separate compilation recordings of past songs taken from previous albums. In 2009, Patty received two GMA Dove Award nominations: Female Vocalist of the Year, and Inspirational Album of the Year (Songs for the Journey).

Simply Sandi, an acoustic album, was released on May 5, 2009. Significantly, it was Patty's first solo project to be released on her own record label, Stylos Records. Two other artists, Ben Utecht and Heather Payne, also signed to the label, which was distributed by WEA Distribution.

In Fall 2009, Patty released her first live Christmas album entitled Christmas: LIVE. The album includes live performances of her past Christmas favorites including "O Holy Night," "Someday," and a duet with her husband Don Peslis in "The Prayer."

=== 2010–2017 ===
In late 2010, Patty released The Edge of the Divine. The album featured eight new songs, including a duet with former Point of Grace member Heather Payne. A book of the same name was also released, with the subtitle "Where Possibility Meets God's Faithfulness."

In October 2011, Patty released Broadway Stories, which capitalized on Patty's pops concerts popularity. From iTunes Review: "Before Sandi Patty was a Christian music star, she developed her craft by performing stage standards and pop tunes from the Great American Songbook. Broadway Stories reaffirms her mastery of such material against gorgeous backdrops provided by the 64-piece Prague Symphony Orchestra. From the first track to the last, Patty shows an easy command of the Broadway idiom, applying her formidable pipes to material worthy of her talents."

In January 2012, Patty starred as Dolly Levi in the Indianapolis Symphony Orchestra's world premiere concert stage version of the Broadway musical Hello, Dolly! to rave reviews.

In 2012 and 2013, Patty was a judge and mentor for the Songbook Academy, a summer intensive for high school students operated by the Great American Songbook Foundation and founded by Michael Feinstein.

In 2015, Patty announced her retirement from touring, citing age and a desire to spend time with grandchildren.

In 2016, Patty released Forever Grateful, an album of new and re-recorded material, and embarked on a farewell tour of the same title between February 2016 through March 2017. She spent several years as the Artist in Residence at Crossings Community Church in Oklahoma City.

=== 2017–2025 ===
Sandi limited her performance schedule during this time, and in 2020 started a weekly podcast with her husband called Sunsets with Don and Sandi, streaming live Saturday evenings on her Facebook and Instagram pages. Sandi performed “What a Wonderful World” at President Carter's 100th birthday. In 2025, she was honored with a tribute concert with some of the biggest names in music at the Schermerhorn Symphony in Nashville, Tennessee.

=== 2026–present ===
Sandi returned to the studio to record a new single (“The Voice I Have Now”), produced by Gordon Mote, in conjunction with her 70th birthday. The new single and music video, released August 21, has been met with rave reviews from her fans, peers, and the music industry at large debuting at #1 on Apple Music Christian Charts. Sandi will be performing as part of a select number of artists at the Grand Old Opry's 100th Anniversary. Sandi has an upcoming new studio album called “Back to Love” being released February 2027, alongside a live concert DVD filmed at Crossings Community Church in Oklahoma City.

== Personal life ==
In 2009, Patty and her family relocated from Anderson, Indiana, to Oklahoma City. Patty and her husband returned to Indianapolis, Indiana following her semi-retirement in 2017. She is happily married for over 30 years to fellow singer Don Peslis. As a blended family, they have eight children and thirteen grandchildren.

Patty has remained active with various charities such as World Help, Charity Music Inc., and mental health organizations.

== Discography ==
- 1979: Sandi's Song
- 1981: Love Overflowing
- 1982: Lift Up the Lord
- 1983: More Than Wonderful
- 1983: Christmas: The Gift Goes On
- 1984: Songs from the Heart
- 1985: Hymns Just for You
- 1986: Morning Like This
- 1988: Make His Praise Glorious
- 1989: Sandi Patti and the Friendship Company
- 1990: Another Time...Another Place
- 1991: The Friendship Company: Open for Business
- 1993: Le Voyage
- 1994: Find It On the Wings (released under Sandi Patty)
- 1996: O Holy Night! (Christmas)
- 1996: An American Songbook (non-commercial release)
- 1997: Artist of My Soul
- 1998: Libertad me das (Spanish album)
- 1999: Together (with Kathy Troccoli)
- 2000: These Days
- 2001: All the Best...Live! (Released in conjunction with VHS Video)
- 2003: Take Hold of Christ
- 2004: Hymns of Faith...Songs of Inspiration
- 2005: Yuletide Joy (Christmas)
- 2007: Falling forward
- 2008: Songs for The Journey
- 2008: A Mother's Prayer
- 2009: Simply Sandi
- 2009: Christmas Live (Christmas) (Released in conjunction with DVD Video)
- 2010: The Edge of the Divine
- 2011: Broadway Stories
- 2013: Everlasting (Target store exclusive)
- 2014: Christmas Blessings
- 2015: Sweet Dreams: Soothing Lullabies (Wal-Mart exclusive)
- 2016: Forever Grateful (Lifeway exclusive)
- 2017: Forever Grateful: Live From the Farewell Tour (Released in conjunction with DVD Video)

• 2026: The Voice I Have Now (single)

• 2027: Back to Love (to be released in conjunction with DVD video)

=== Compilations ===
- 1985: Inspirational Favorites
- 1989: The Finest Moments (contains one new song)
- 1992: Hallmark Christmas: Celebrate Christmas!
- 1994: Quiet Reflections
- 1996: Hallmark Christmas: It's Christmas! Sandi Patty & Peabo Bryson
- 2005: Duets
- 2006: The Voice of Christmas
- 2007: The Definitive Collection
- 2008: Gospel Greats
- 2008: Via Dolorosa: Songs of Redemption
- 2008: A Mother's Prayer: Songs that Inspire a Mother's Heart
- 2008: Quiet Hearts: Songs of Restful Peace for Women
- 2008: Let There Be Praise
- 2009: Duets 2
- 2011: The Best of Sandi Patty from the Gaither Homecoming Series
- 2012: The Voice of Christmas, Volume 2
- 2012: Rarities
- 2014: Ultimate Collection, Volume 1
- 2014: Ultimate Collection, Volume 2

== Writing ==
- 1993: Le Voyage
- 1994: Merry Christmas, With Love
- 1999: Sam's Rainbow
- 2000: I've Just Seen Jesus
- 2006: Broken on the Back Row
- 2006: Life in the Blender: Blending Families, Lives and Relationships with Grace (Women of Faith)
- 2006: A New Day: A Guided Journal
- 2007: Falling Forward... into His Arms of Grace
- 2008: Layers
- 2010: The Edge of the Divine
- 2018: The Voice: Listening for God's Voice and Finding Your Own

== Awards and nominations ==
=== Grammy Awards ===
Year	Category	Nominated work	Result
1984	Best Gospel Performance by a Duo or Group	"More Than Wonderful" (with Larnelle Harris)	Won
1984	Best Gospel Performance, Female	Christmas: The Gift Goes On (album)	Nominated
1985	Best Gospel Performance, Female	Songs from the Heart	Nominated
1986	Best Gospel Performance by a Duo or Group	"I've Just Seen Jesus" (with Larnelle Harris)	Won
1986	Best Gospel Performance, Female	Hymns Just for You (album)	Nominated
1987	Best Gospel Performance by a Duo or Group	"They Say" (with Deniece Williams)	Won
1987	Best Gospel Performance, Female	Morning Like This (album)	Won
1989	Best Gospel Performance, Female	"Almighty God"	Nominated
1990	Best Gospel Performance, Female	"Forever Friends"	Nominated
1991	Best Pop/Contemporary Gospel Album	Another Time...Another Place	Won
1994	Best Pop/Contemporary Gospel Album	Le Voyage	Nominated
1996	Best Pop/Contemporary Gospel Album	Find It On the Wings	Nominated

=== GMA Dove Awards ===
- 1982–92: Female Vocalist of the Year (11 consecutive years)
- 1982, 1984, 1985, 1987, 1988: Artist of the Year
- Inducted into the Gospel Music Association Hall of Fame in 2004

Year	Category	Nominated work	Result
1983	Inspirational Album	Lift Up the Lord	Won
1984	Inspirational Album	More Than Wonderful	Won
1985	Inspirational Album	Songs from the Heart	Won
1987	Inspirational Album	Morning Like This	Won
1988	Song of the Year	"In the Name of the Lord"	Won
1989	Inspirational Album	Make His Praise Glorious	Won
1989	Inspirational Song	"In Heaven's Eyes"	Won
1989	Instrumental Album	A Symphony of Praise	Won
1989	Choral Collection	Sandi Patty Choral Praise	Won
1990	Children's Album	The Friendship Company	Won
1991	Inspirational Album	Another Time, Another Place	Won
1991	Pop/Contemporary Song	"Another Time, Another Place"	Won
1992	Short-Form Music Video	"Another Time, Another Place"	Won
1992	Children's Album	Open for Business (The Friendship Company)	Won
1992	Inspirational Song	"For All the World"	Won
1994	Short-Form Music Video	"Hand on My Shoulder"	Won
1995	Female Vocalist	Female Vocalist of the Year	Nominated
1995	Inspirational Album	Find It on the Wings	Won
1996	Special Event Album	My Utmost for His Highest (various artists)	Won
1998	Special Event Album	God with Us – A Celebration of Christmas Carols & Classics (various artists)	Won
1998	Inspirational Album	Artist of My Soul	Won
1999	Long-Form Music Video	My Utmost for His Highest (various artists)	Won
1999	Spanish Language Album	Libertad de Mas (tie)	Won
2002	Long-Form Music Video	All The Best...Live!	Nominated
2004	Inspirational Album	Take Hold of Christ	Nominated
2005	Inspirational Album	Hymns of Faith...Songs of Inspiration	Nominated
2008	Female Vocalist	Female Vocalist of the Year	Nominated
2008	Inspirational Album	Falling Forward	Nominated
2009	Inspirational Album	Songs for the Journey	Nominated
2011	Inspirational Album	The Edge of the Divine	Won
2014	Inspirational Album	Everlasting	Nominated
2016	Children's Album	Sweet Dreams	Nominated
