= The Imperials discography =

Discography for the Christian music vocal quartet The Imperials

This is a discography for the Christian music vocal quartet The Imperials.

== Albums ==
Year	Album	Members who performed	Record label	Record producer
1964	Jake Hess & The Imperials	Hess, McSpadden, Morales, Neilsen, Slaughter	Skylite	
1964	Introducing The Illustrious Imperials	Hess, McSpadden, Morales, Neilsen, Slaughter	Heart Warming/Benson	
1964	Fireside Hymns	Hess, McSpadden, Morales, Neilsen, Slaughter	Heart Warming/Benson	
1964	Blends and Rhythms	Hess, McSpadden, Morales, Neilsen, Slaughter	Heart Warming/Benson	
1965	Talent Times Five	Hess, McSpadden, Morales, Neilsen, Slaughter	Heart Warming/Benson	
1965	Slaughter Writes – Imperials Sing	Hess, McSpadden, Morales, Neilsen, Slaughter	Heart Warming/Benson	
1965	Happy Sounds of The Imperials	Hess, McSpadden, Morales, Neilsen, Slaughter	Heart Warming/Benson	
1965	He Was a Preachin Man	Hess, McSpadden, Morales, Neilsen, Slaughter	Heart Warming/Benson	
1965	Slightly Regal	Hess, McSpadden, Morales, Neilsen, Slaughter	Heart Warming/Benson	
1966	Sing Their Favorite Hymns	Hess, McSpadden, Morales, Murray, Slaughter	Heart Warming/Benson	
1966	Sing Inspirational Classics	Hess, McSpadden, Morales, Murray, Slaughter	Impact/Benson	
1967	To Sing Is the Thing	Hess, McSpadden, Morales, Murray, Moscheo	Impact/Benson	
1968	New Dimensions	Morales, Murray, Moscheo, Blackwood, Wiles	Impact/Benson	
1968	Now	Morales, Murray, Moscheo, Blackwood, Wiles	Impact/Benson	
1969	Love Is the Thing	Morales, Murray, Moscheo, Blackwood, Wiles	Impact/Benson	
1970	Gospel's Alive and Well	Morales, Murray, Moscheo, Blackwood, Wiles	Impact/Benson	
1971	Time to Get It Together	Morales, Murray, Moscheo, Blackwood, Gordon	Impact/Benson	
1972	Imperials	Morales, Murray, Moscheo, Blackwood, Andrus	Impact/Benson	
1973	Live (double album)	Morales, Murray, Moscheo, Blackwood, Andrus	Impact/Benson	
1974	Follow the Man with the Music	Morales, Murray, Moscheo, Blackwood, Andrus	Impact/Benson	
1975	No Shortage	Morales, Murray, Moscheo, Blackwood, Andrus	Impact/Benson	Bob MacKenzie, Gary S. Paxton
1976	Just Because	Morales, Murray, Moscheo, Blackwood, Andrus	Impact/Benson	
1977	Sail On	Morales, Murray, Will, Taff	Dayspring/Word	Chris Christian
1978	Imperials Live	Morales, Murray, Will, Taff	Dayspring/Word	A. Morales, Buddy Huey, Chris Christian
1979	Heed the Call	Morales, Murray, Will, Taff	Dayspring/Word	Chris Christian
1979	One More Song for You	Morales, Murray, Will, Taff	Dayspring/Word	Michael Omartian
1980	Christmas with The Imperials	Morales, Murray, Will, Taff	Dayspring/Word	Bergen White
1980	Priority	Morales, Murray, Will, Taff	Dayspring/Word	Michael Omartian
1982	Stand by the Power	Morales, Murray, Will, P. Smith	Dayspring/Word	Bill Schnee
1983	Side by Side	Morales, Murray, Will, P. Smith	Dayspring/Word	Keith Thomas, Neal Joseph
1984	The Imperials Sing the Classics	Morales, Murray, Will, P. Smith	Dayspring/Word	Neal Joseph
1985	Let the Wind Blow	Morales, Murray, Will, P. Smith	Myrrh/Word	Brown Bannister
1987	This Year's Model	Morales, Will, Hemby, Sloas	Myrrh/Word	Brown Bannister
1988	Free the Fire	Morales, Will, Hemby, Sloas	Myrrh/Word	Bill Schnee
1990	Love's Still Changing Hearts	Morales, Will, Hemby, Robertson	StarSong	Morris "Butch" Stewart
1991	Big God	Morales, Will, Hildreth, Pam Morales	StarSong	Ken Mansfield
1992	Stir It Up	Morales, Will, Hildreth, Pam Morales	StarSong	Paul Mills
1995	'Til He Comes	Morales, Will, Ferguson, Walker	Impact/Homeland	Brian Green
1997	It's Still the Cross	Morales, Will, Ferguson, Shapiro	Big God Records	Barry Weeks
1998	Songs of Christmas	Morales, Will, Ferguson, Weeks	Big God Records	Barry Weeks
2002	I Was Made for This	A. Morales, Hudson, J. Morales, Crook	Big God Records	
2006*	The Lost Album	A. Morales, Murray, Will, Taff	Word	Gary S. Paxton
2007	The Imperials	Hudson, J. Morales, S. Smith, Owens	Indie/Lamon Records	
2007	Back to the Roots	Hudson, J. Morales, S. Smith, Owens	Indie/Lamon Records	Michael Sykes
2008	Standing Strong	A. Morales, Will, Hiner, Evans	Infinity Music/Hall of Fame Record Company	Robbie Hiner
2010	Still Standing	A. Morales, Will, P. Smith, Evans	Infinity Music/Hall of Fame Record Company	Michael Peterson, Rick Webb, Rick Evans

*originally recorded in 1976

=== Compilations ===
- 1970: Believe It (Vista)
- 1972: The Imperials 1968–1972 (Impact/Benson)
- 1973: A Thing Called Love (Vista)
- 1977: The Best of the Imperials (Impact/Benson)
- 1979: The Imperials – Featuring Terry and Sherman (Impact/Benson)
- 1981: The Very Best of the Imperials (Dayspring/Word)
- 1982: First Day in Heaven (Impact/Benson)
- 1984: Give Them All to Jesus (Impact/Benson)
- 1986: Old Fashioned Faith (Dayspring/Word)
- 1989: 20 Favorites by the Imperials (Benson)
- 1992: Masters of Gospel (RiverSong/Benson)
- 1994: Treasures (StarSong)
- 1996: The Imperials – Legacy 1977–1988 (Word)
- 1998: Gospel Music Hall of Fame 1964–1976 (Benson)
- 2006: The Imperials – Classic Hits (New Haven/Provident)
- 2007: The Definitive Collection (Word/Warner)
- 2014: The Ultimate Collection (Word/Curb)

== Elvis Presley with The Imperials (complete albums) ==
- 1966: How Great Thou Art (RCA)
- 1969: From Memphis to Vegas/From Vegas to Memphis (Elvis in Person at the International Hotel) (RCA)
- 1970: Live at the International Hotel, Las Vegas, NV August 26, 1969 (RCA)
- 1970: On Stage (RCA)
- 1970: That's the Way It Is (RCA)
- 1971: Elvis Country (I'm 10,000 Years Old) (RCA)
- 1971: Love Letters from Elvis (RCA)
- 1971: Elvis Sings The Wonderful World of Christmas (RCA)
- 1972: Elvis Now (RCA)
- 1972: He Touched Me (RCA)
- 1973: Elvis (RCA)

== Appearances on other albums ==
- 1964: The Best Of Heart Warming – various artists; "Lord, I Need You" (HeartWarming Records)
- 1965: Dottie Rambo and The Imperials (HeartWarming Records)
- 1965: A Man Named Smith – Fred Smith and Jake Hess & The Imperials (Impact Records)
- 1965: Bill Sings the Old Favorites – Bill Gober and Jake Hess & The Imperials (HeartWarming Records)
- 1966: The Gloryland Way – Hank Locklin (RCA Victor)
- 1966: Sings Great Sacred Songs – Connie Smith and Jake Hess & The Imperials (RCA Viktor)
- 1966: Gospel Train – Hank Snow and Jake Hess & The Imperials (RCA Viktor)
- 1967: Christmas with Hank Snow – Hank Snow and Jake Hess & The Imperials (RCA Viktor)
- 1967: Most Richly Blessed – Jimmy Dean and Jake Hess & The Imperials (RCA Viktor)
- 1967: Doug Oldham with Jake Hess and the Imperials sing 12 Songs by Bill Gaither (HeartWarming)
- 1971: Here's to Veterans 99 – The Imperials (Program No. 1276) / Wilma Burgess (The Veterans Administration)
- 1975: Christmas at Our House – various artists; "Infant Holy" (Impact)
- 1976: Doug Oldham and Friends; with the Imperials on "I've Got Something to Sing About" (Impact)
- 1976: The Name of Jesus – Jimmy Swaggart (JIM Records); "He Was Nailed to the Cross for Me", "He Washed My Eyes with Tears"
- 1976: Only Jesus – Jimmy Swaggart (JIM Records)
- 1984: The Praise in Us: A Word Family Praise Album – various artists; "The Praise In Us" (Word Records)
- 1985: The Continental Singers – Together We Stand; "Who Will Save the Children?" (Music Mercy)
- 1988: Shake: Christian Artists Face the Music; a non-music album of interviews with various artists (Myrrh)
- 1989: Love Is You to Me – Kim Boyce; with the Imperials on the title song (Myrrh)
- 1990: Handel's Young Messiah; "O Thou That Tellest Good Tidings to Zion" (Sony)
- 1992: A Few Good Men – Gaither Vocal Band (title song) (Star Song)
- 1996: The Greatest Gift – various artists; "Let's Go To Bethlehem" (Wright Music)
- 2003: The Gospel Side of Elvis – The Stamps and The Imperials (Armond, Jim, Terry & Sherman) (Double CD) (Gold Street Records)

== Singles ==
Year	Single	CCM AC	CCM CHR	AC peak	Album	Composer(s)
1978	Sail On	3	3	–	Sail On	Chris Christian
1978	Water Grave	14	14	–	Sail On	Steve & Annie Chapman
1979	Overcomer	15	15	–	Heed The Call	James Hollihan
1979	Praise the Lord	1	2	–	Heed The Call	Brown Bannister/Mike Hudson
1979	Oh Buddha	1	1	–	Heed The Call	Mark Farrow
1980	What I Can Do for You	12	13	–	One More Song for You	Michael & Stormie Omartian
1980	I'm Forgiven	1	1	–	One More Song for You	M. Omartian, Bruce Hibbard, Hadley Hockensmith
1980	One More Song for You	10	10	–	One More Song for You	Michael & Stormie Omartian
1980	Living Without Your Love	–	–	43	One More Song for You	Tom Hemby
1981	I'd Rather Believe in You	3	5	–	Priority	Michael & Stormie Omartian
1981	Finish What You Started	2	2	–	Priority	Russ & Tori Taff/Michael Omartian
1981	The Trumpet of Jesus	1	1	–	Priority	Michael & Stormie Omartian
1981	Be Still My Soul	7	19	–	Priority	Russ & Tori Taff
1983	Lord of the Harvest	1	3	–	Stand by the Power	Paul Smith, James Newton Howard
1983	Somebody New	9	9	–	Stand by the Power	Paul Smith
1983	Because of Who You Are	1	37	–	Stand by the Power	Bob Farrell/Billy Smiley
1984	Wait Upon the Lord	1	1	–	Side by Side	Paul Smith, Ragan Courtney, Keith Thomas
1984	You're the Only Jesus	20	20	–	Side by Side	Gordon Jensen
1984	Make My Heart Your Home	13	13	–	Side by Side	Paul Smith, Keith Thomas
1985	Let the Wind Blow	1	1	–	Let the Wind Blow	David Martin
1985	In The Promised Land	3	9	–	Let the Wind Blow	Chris Eaton
1986	Jericho	12	–	–	Let the Wind Blow	Paul Smith, Michael W. Smith, Mike Hudson
1986	Taking the Time	27	–	–	Let the Wind Blow	Paul Smith, Mike Hudson, Keith Thomas
1987	Wings of Love	1	2	–	This Year's Model	Keith Thomas, Paul C. Smith
1987	Get Ready	4	10	–	This Year's Model	J. Lee Sloas
1987	How Do I Get You?	–	14	–	This Year's Model	Mark Gendel, Bob Johnson
1987	Holding On (First Love)	23	3	–	This Year's Model	Pam Mark Hall, Keith Thomas
1987	Fallin	–	6	–	This Year's Model	Jimmie Lee Sloas
1987	Devoted To You	7	–	–	This Year's Model	Ron Hemby, Stephen Bashaw
1987	Rest Your Arms	18	–	–	Free the Fire	Ron Hemby, Tom Hemby
1988	Free the Fire in Me	2	1	–	Free the Fire	Michael & Stormie Omartian
1989	The Boss	16	1	–	Free the Fire	Jimmie Lee Sloas
1989	You	6	6	–	Free the Fire	Randy Goodrum/Robbie Buchanan/Jimmie Lee
1990	Big Ball Turning	–	2	–	Love's Still Changing Hearts	Butch Stewart, Brenda Blonski
1990	It's Raining Again	1	–	–	Love's Still Changing Hearts	David Robertson
1990	I Will Follow You	3	–	–	Love's Still Changing Hearts	David Robertson, John Wierick
1990	It's Gonna Be Alright	4	4	–	Love's Still Changing Hearts	Ron Hemby
1990	Come into My Life	12	12	–	Love's Still Changing Hearts	Paul Chiten, Pamela Phillips-Oland
1990	Come Let Us Worship	5	–	–	Love's Still Changing Hearts	David Robertson, John Wierick
1990	Original Love	13	13	–	Love's Still Changing Hearts	Keith Brown
1991	Nothing Less	13	–	–	Big God	Gary Driskell, Leonard Ahlstrom
1992	Carry Your Hart To Me	8	–	–	Big God	Regie Hamm, Joel Lindsey
1992	Take Me There	17	–	–	Big God	Bill Cantos, Julius Drummin, Ty Lacy
1993	Taking Your Love for Granted	1	3	–	Stir It Up	Michael Peterson
1993	We're All Looking	2	–	–	Stir It Up	Dwight Liles, Judy Reno
1993	Change the World	–	14	–	Stir It Up	Terry Esau
1993	Standing on the Rock of Love	14	9	–	Stir It Up	Julius Drummin, Ty Lacy
1993	Stir It Up	–	4	–	Stir It Up	Julius Drummin, Keith Brown

== Video ==
- 1970: Elvis: That's the Way It Is (MGM) (Armond, Jim, Joe, Terry & Roger)
- 1984: The Imperials 20th Anniversary (Myrrh/Word) (Armond, Jim, Dave & Paul)
- 2003: Elvis Lives 25th Anniversary Concert (Armond, Jim, Joe, Terry, Roger & Sherman)
- 2010: Still Standing (CMD Distribution) (Armond, Dave, Paul & Rick)
