= Dove Award for Pop/Contemporary Album of the Year =

Annual US music award

The Dove Award for Pop/Contemporary Album of the Year has been awarded since 1976, except for 1979. Years reflect the year in which the Dove Awards were presented, for works released in the previous year.

== 2020s ==
- Dove Awards of 2022
  - For King & Country for What Are We Waiting For?
- Dove Awards of 2021
  - We the Kingdom for Holy Water
- Dove Awards of 2020
  - Tauren Wells for Citizen of Heaven

== 2010s ==
- Dove Awards of 2019
  - Lauren Daigle for Look Up Child
- Dove Awards of 2018
  - Tauren Wells for Hills and Valleys
- Dove Awards of 2017
  - MercyMe for Lifer
- Dove Awards of 2016
  - TobyMac for This is Not a Test
- Dove Awards of 2015
  - for KING & COUNTRY for RUN WILD. LIVE FREE. LOVE STRONG.
- Dove Awards of 2014
  - Mandisa for Overcomer
- Dove Awards of 2013
  - TobyMac for Eye on It
- Dove Awards of 2012
  - Laura Story for Blessings
- Dove Awards of 2011
  - Chris August for No Far Away
- Dove Awards of 2010
  - Jars of Clay for The Long Fall Back to Earth

== 2000s ==
- Dove Awards of 2009
  - Third Day for Revelation
- Dove Awards of 2008
  - Casting Crowns for The Altar and the Door
- Dove Awards of 2007
  - Chris Tomlin for See the Morning
- Dove Awards of 2006
  - Casting Crowns for Lifesong
- Dove Awards of 2005
  - MercyMe for Undone
- Dove Awards of 2004
  - Stacie Orrico for Stacie Orrico
- Dove Awards of 2003
  - Nichole Nordeman for Woven & Spun
- Dove Awards of 2002
  - Steven Curtis Chapman for Declaration
- Dove Awards of 2001
  - Michael W. Smith for This Is Your Time
- Dove Awards of 2000
  - Steven Curtis Chapman for Speechless

== 1990s ==
- Dove Awards of 1999
  - Michael W. Smith for Live The Life
- Dove Awards of 1998
  - Amy Grant for Behind The Eyes
- Dove Awards of 1997
  - Steven Curtis Chapman for Signs Of Life
- Dove Awards of 1996
  - Point of Grace for The Whole Truth
- Dove Awards of 1995
  - Steven Curtis Chapman for Heaven in the Real World
- Dove Awards of 1994
  - Michael English for Hope
- Dove Awards of 1993
  - Steven Curtis Chapman for The Great Adventure
- Dove Awards of 1992
  - Steven Curtis Chapman for For the Sake of the Call
- Dove Awards of 1991
  - Michael W. Smith for Go West Young Man
- Dove Awards of 1990
  - BeBe and CeCe Winans for Heaven

== 1980s ==
- Dove Awards of 1989
  - Amy Grant for Lead Me On
- Dove Awards of 1988
  - Wayne Watson for Watercolour Ponies
- Dove Awards of 1987
  - Michael W. Smith for The Big Picture
- Dove Awards of 1986
  - Russ Taff for Medals
- Dove Awards of 1985
  - Amy Grant for Straight Ahead
- Dove Awards of 1984
  - The Imperials for Side By Side
- Dove Awards of 1983
  - Amy Grant for Age to Age
- Dove Awards of 1982
  - The Imperials for Priority
- Dove Awards of 1981
  - The Imperials for One More Song For You
- Dove Awards of 1980
  - Dallas Holm and Praise for All That Matters

== 1970s ==
- Dove Awards of 1978
  - Cruse Family for Transformation
- Dove Awards of 1977
  - Reba Rambo-McGuire for Lady
- Dove Awards of 1976
  - The Imperials for No Shortage
