= The Very Best of the Imperials =

Compilation album by the Imperials
- Released: 1981
- Recorded: 1976–1980
- Genre: Contemporary Christian music; Christian pop; inspirational; gospel
- Length: 40:36
- Label: DaySpring/Word Records
- Producer: Michael Omartian, Chris Christian, Gary S. Paxton

The Imperials chronology
Priority (1980)	The Very Best of the Imperials (1981)	Stand by the Power (1982)

Professional ratings
Review scores
Source	Rating
AllMusic	2/5 stars

The Very Best of the Imperials is a compilation album by American Christian music group the Imperials, released in late 1981 on DaySpring Records. It is a collection of the Imperials' best songs from the Russ Taff years 1976–1980, covering their four albums Sail On, Heed the Call, One More Song for You and Priority. The album also contains a never-before-released track "Same Old Fashioned Way" written and performed by baritone singer David Will recorded in 1976. It would later be featured on The Lost Album in 2006. The track is produced by recording artist-producer Gary S. Paxton. The album peaked at number two on the Billboard Top Inspirational Albums chart.

== Track listing ==
No.	Title	Writer(s)	Original album	Length
1.	"Living Without Your Love"	Tom Hemby	One More Song for You (*)	3:27
2.	"I'm Forgiven"	Michael Omartian, Bruce Hibbard, Hadley Hockensmith	One More Song for You (*)	3:54
3.	"I'd Rather Believe in You"	M. Omartian, Stormie Omartian	Priority (*)	3:37
4.	"Bread on the Water"	Bill Grine, Janny Grine	Sail On (**)	3:08
5.	"Praise the Lord"	Brown Bannister, Mike Hudson	Heed the Call (**)	3:35
6.	"One More Song for You"	M. Omartian, S. Omartian	One More Song for You (*)	4:38
7.	"Oh Buddha"	Mark Farrow	Heed the Call (**)	3:28
8.	"Same Old Fashioned Way"	David Will	previously unreleased until 2006's The Lost Album (***)	5:02
9.	"Sail On"	Chris Christian	Sail On (**)	3:20
10.	"Eagle Song"	Russ Taff, Tori Taff	One More Song for You (*)	3:14
11.	"The Trumpet of Jesus"	M. Omartian, S. Omartian	Priority (*)	3:46

Note: (*) – tracks produced by Michael Omartian; (**) – tracks produced by Chris Christian; (***) – produced by Gary S. Paxton

== Personnel ==
The Imperials

- Russ Taff – lead vocals
- Jim Murray – tenor, vocals
- David Will – baritone, vocals
- Armond Morales – bass, vocals

== Charts ==
Chart (1982)	Peak position
US Top Inspirational Albums (Billboard)	2
