= Let the Wind Blow (album) =

Studio album by The Imperials
- Released: 1985
- Studio: Bullet Recording Studio, Nashville, Tennessee; Bennett House, Franklin, Tennessee; Bill Schnee Studio, Los Angeles, California; Mama Jo's, Los Angeles, CA
- Genre: CCM; Christian pop
- Length: 42:01
- Label: Myrrh/Word Records
- Producer: Brown Bannister

The Imperials chronology
The Imperials Sing the Classics (1984)	Let the Wind Blow (1985)	This Year's Model (1987)

Professional ratings
Review scores
Source	Rating
AllMusic	2/5 stars

Let the Wind Blow is the 31st studio album by Christian music vocal group The Imperials released in 1985. It is their first album on Word Records' Myrrh label after nearly a decade on DaySpring Records, another Word affiliated label. The group saw its biggest turnover since Terry Blackwood and Sherman Andrus' departure when both Paul Smith and long-time tenor Jim Murray left the group. Smith opted for a solo CCM career while Murray sought to perform more traditionally styled gospel music again. Smith was replaced by Danny Ward on tour to promote Let the Wind Blow, but he left before recording an album with the group. New members Jimmie Lee Sloas and Ron Hemby joined veteran members Armond Morales and David Will in 1986 to record their next album This Year's Model (1987). The group was nominated for a Grammy Award for Best Gospel Performance by a Duo or Group at the 28th Grammy Awards. The album peaked at number 4 on the Billboard Top Inspirational Albums chart.

== Track listing ==
No.	Title	Writer(s)	Length
1.	"In the Promised Land"	Chris Eaton	4:20
2.	"Bread of Life"	Billy Smiley, Mark Gersmehl, Scott Douglas	3:54
3.	"Let the Wind Blow"	David Martin	5:04
4.	"Jericho"	Paul Smith, Michael W. Smith, Mike Hudson	4:54
5.	"The Deeper Meaning"	Teri DeSario, Bill Purse	4:11
6.	"Sing for Joy"	P. Smith, Denise Smith, Keith Thomas	3:32
7.	"Today"	T. DeSario, B. Purse	3:43
8.	"Taking the Time"	P. Smith, K. Thomas, Pam Mark Hall	3:57
9.	"Miracles"	P. Smith, M. Hudson, K. Thomas	4:17
10.	"Not to Us, O Lord"	P. Smith, M. W. Smith	4:20

== Personnel ==
The Imperials

- Paul Smith – lead vocals
- Jim Murray – tenor, vocals
- David Will – baritone, vocals
- Armond Morales – bass, vocals

Musicians

- Robbie Buchanan – synthesizers (1–3, 5–7), Rhodes electric piano (2, 3, 5, 6, 8), synth bass (2)
- Shane Keister – additional synthesizers (3, 9)
- Michael W. Smith – keyboards (4), acoustic piano (10), Fairlight CMI (10)
- Keith Thomas – acoustic piano (6, 8), synthesizers (6), keyboards (9)
- Bill Purse – keyboards (7)
- John Andrew Schreiner – additional synthesizers (9)
- Rhett Lawrence – Fairlight programming (10)
- Dann Huff – guitars (1–9), guitar solo (4)
- Nathan East – bass (1–3, 5, 6, 8, 9)
- Mike Brignardello – bass (4, 7)
- Paul Leim – drums (1–9)
- Paulinho da Costa – percussion (1, 2, 4, 6, 8)
- Doug Dana – horns (1, 8)
- Larry Williams – horns (1, 8)
- Berwyn Linton – horns (1, 8)
- Bill Reichenbach Jr. – horns (1, 8)
- Chuck Findley – horns (1, 8)
- Gary Grant – horns (1, 8)
- Jerry Hey – horns (1, 8), horn arrangements (1, 8)

Production

- Michael Blanton – executive producer, album concept
- Dan Harrell – executive producer
- Brown Bannister – producer, vocal arrangements
- The Imperials – vocal arrangements
- Jack Joseph Puig – engineer, mixing
- Steve Ford – assistant engineer
- Dan Garcia – assistant engineer
- Alan Henry – assistant engineer
- Clark Schleicher – assistant engineer
- The Mastering Lab (Hollywood, California) – mastering location
- Bob Golden – album concept
- Michael Halvig – album concept
- Kent Hunter – album concept, art direction, design
- Dan Johnson – album concept
- Roger Sanders – album concept
- Mark Tucker – album concept, photography
- Ken Wolgemuth – album concept
- Thomas Ryan Design – art direction, design
- Daniel Buehler – computer imagery
- Dr. Frank Marks – Doppler weather radar image

== Critical reception ==
Evan Cater of AllMusic has said that the "arrangements are loaded with the tinny, cheap-sounding keyboards that dominated pop in the '80s, although 'Miracles' features an almost -- can this word really be applied to the Imperials? -- funky bass intro. If you happen to come across a dust-covered copy in your church basement, you might consider throwing this one on."

== Charts ==
Chart (1985)	Peak position
US Top Inspirational Albums (Billboard)	4

=== Radio singles ===
Year	Singles	Peak positions	
Year	Singles	CCM AC	CCM CHR
1985	"Let the Wind Blow"	1	1
1985	"In the Promised Land"	3	9
1986	"Jericho"	12	—
1986	"Taking the Time"	27	—
