= Free the Fire =

Studio album by The Imperials
- Released: 1988
- Studios: Bill Schnee Studios, Los Angeles, California; The Bunny Hop, Los Angeles, CA; 41B Studios, Westlake Village, California; O'Henry Sound Studios, Burbank, California
- Genres: CCM; Christian pop
- Length: 48:19
- Label: Myrrh/Word Records
- Producer: Bill Schnee

The Imperials chronology
This Year's Model (1987)	Free the Fire (1988)	Love's Still Changing Hearts (1990)

Free the Fire is the 33rd studio album by Christian music vocal group The Imperials released in 1988. This is their third and final album on the Myrrh label and after more than 10 years, their final album overall on Word Records. The Imperials would switch over to Star Song Records for their next album Love's Still Changing Hearts (1990). It is also the last time for the lineup of Jimmie Lee Sloas, Ron Hemby, David Will and Armond Morales from their previous album This Year's Model (1987) as Sloas left the group in 1989 to focus more behind the scenes as a bass guitar player, producer and songwriter and would go on to form the Christian Rock band Dogs of Peace with former Whiteheart guitarist and vocalist Gordon Kennedy. It was a reunion of sorts as the Imperials reunited with Bill Schnee who produced their 1982 album Stand by the Power and the husband and wife team of Michael and Stormie Omartian (One More Song for You, Priority) with music and lyrics on the title song. Baritone singer David Will sings lead on the Cliff Richard track "Better Than I Know Myself" from Richard's 1981 album Wired for Sound. Free the Fire debuted and peaked at number 11 on the Billboard Top Inspirational Albums chart.

== Track listing ==
No.	Title	Writer(s)	Length
1.	"Free the Fire in Me"	Michael Omartian, Stormie Omartian	5:11
2.	"Wild Geese"	Jon Sweet, Rod Trott	4:08
3.	"City in the Sky"	Bill Schnee, Jimmie Lee Sloas, David Martin	4:56
4.	"You"	J. Lee Sloas, Robbie Buchanan, Randy Goodrum	4:55
5.	"The Boss"	J. Lee Sloas	5:17
6.	"Higher Things"	Tommy Sims, Chris Rodriguez	5:11
7.	"Rest in Your Arms"	Ron Hemby, Tom Hemby	4:16
8.	"Let It Go"	J. Lee Sloas, D. Martin	4:15
9.	"Better Than I Know Myself"	Dave Cooke, Judy MacKenzie	4:08
10.	"Touchin' Me"	J. Lee Sloas, R. Hemby	4:03
11.	"I Just Came to Praise the Lord"	Wayne Romero	1:59

== Personnel ==
The Imperials

- Jimmie Lee Sloas – tenor (lead vocals on tracks 3, 5, 8–10)
- Ron Hemby – tenor (lead vocals on tracks 1, 2, 4, 6, 7, 9)
- David Will – baritone (lead vocals on track 9)
- Armond Morales – bass, vocals

Musicians

- Michael Omartian – grand piano (1, 5, 11), synthesizers (1)
- Robbie Buchanan – organ (1), keyboards (2–10)
- Dann Huff – guitars (1–10)
- David Lindley – slide guitar (3)
- Jimmie Lee Sloas – bass (1–10)
- Paul Leim – drums (1–10)
- Lenny Castro – percussion (1–10)
- Brandon Fields – saxophone (2, 4, 8)

Production

- Bill Schnee – producer, engineer
- Wade Jaynes – assistant engineer
- Bart Stevens – assistant engineer
- Doug Sax – mastering at The Mastering Lab (Hollywood, California)
- Lynn Nichols – A&R direction
- Mark Maxwell – A&R direction
- Dee Dee Jaynes – A&R assistant
- Deborah Klein – production assistant
- Roland Young – art direction, design
- Howard Rosenberg – photography
- Darin Walter – stylist

== Critical reception ==
Professional ratings
Review scores
Source	Rating
AllMusic	2/5 stars
Cross Rhythms	7/10 stars

Evan Cater at AllMusic said the album "was a disappointment for admirers of the Imperials' daring 1987 effort, "This Year's Model.' Producer Bill Schnee retained a few elements of the big electronic sound developed by his predecessor, Brown Bannister. But most of the power and texture of the production, as well as the dark, mysterious tone that had generated so much excitement about the so-called 'new' Imperials the previous year, were discarded completely." Cater also said from the This Year's Model review that "the new Imperials had gone the way of the moonwalk, as the band turned in the styling gel and retreated to the safer, church-friendly vibe that made them famous" for this album.

Over at Cross Rhythms, Mike Rimmer rated the album 7 out of 10 saying that This Year's Model "had taken them in a rockier direction and they'd lost fans so for 'Free The Fire' they returned to a poppier sound, although it was still infused with plenty of slick, '80s production from Bill Schnee and several of the tracks here sounded more than a bit like a black R&B group." Rimmer also highlighted songs like "You", "which is dripping with cool sax riffs to the opening title track with its robust pop rock sounds and catchy chorus and the groovy "Higher Things" with the Nashville '80s pop sound." Rimmer complimented the Imperials saying that Free the Fire "proves that there was life left in the old dog yet, even after 25 years!"

== Charts ==
Chart (1988)	Peak position
US Top Inspirational Albums (Billboard)	11

=== Radio singles ===
Year	Singles	Peak positions	
Year	Singles	CCM AC	CCM CHR
1987	"Rest in Your Arms"	18	—
1988	"Free the Fire in Me"	2	1
1989	"The Boss"	2	1
1989	"You"	24	6
