= Sail On (Imperials album) =

Studio album by the Imperials
- Released: 1977
- Recorded: 1976
- Studio: Gold Mine Studios (Brentwood, Tennessee); Sound Stage Studios and Jack Clement Recording Studios (Nashville, Tennessee)
- Genre: Contemporary Christian music, Gospel, Inspirational
- Length: 31:36
- Label: DaySpring/Word Records
- Producer: Chris Christian

The Imperials chronology
Just Because (1976)	Sail On (1977)	Imperials Live (1978)

Professional ratings
Review scores
Source	Rating
AllMusic	3/5 stars

Sail On is the 24th studio album by the Christian music vocal group the Imperials. Released in 1977, it is their first album on Word Records' DaySpring label. It is also the first appearance of two new members, Russ Taff on lead vocals and David Will on baritone vocals, in addition to founding member, bass vocalist Armond Morales and tenor Jim Murray. Taff and Will replaced Sherman Andrus and Terry Blackwood, who went on to form the Christian music duo Andrus, Blackwood and Company in 1977 after the release of the 1976 Imperials' album Just Because.

In 1978, the group won their second Grammy Award for Best Gospel Performance, Contemporary or Inspirational for Sail On at the 20th Grammy Awards and at 10th GMA Dove Awards they were named Male Group of the Year. The Imperials' first chart appearances was on CCM Magazine's contemporary hit radio chart in August 1978 with the title song climbing to number three a couple of months later. Sail On has never been released on CD.

== Track listing ==
No.	Title	Writer(s)	Length
1.	"Water Grave"	Steve Chapman	3:56
2.	"Satisfaction Guaranteed"	Chris Christian	3:50
3.	"Gotta Watch, Gotta Pray"	Terry Wayne Robinson	3:08
4.	"More Each Day"	Tim Sheppard	3:28
5.	"There Will Never Be Any Peace"	Eugene Record	2:59
6.	"Sail On"	C. Christian	3:20
7.	"Keep On Walking"	Steve Chapman, Annie Chapman	2:52
8.	"Sonlight"	Jim Murray, James Hollihan, Jr.	3:03
9.	"Bread on the Water"	Bill Grine, Janny Grine	3:08
10.	"Try Again"	Russ Taff	2:59

== Personnel ==
The Imperials

- Russ Taff – lead vocals
- Jim Murray – tenor, vocals
- David Will – baritone, vocals
- Armond Morales – bass, vocals

Musicians

- Chris Christian – keyboards, guitars, banjo, arrangements
- Shane Keister – keyboards
- Bobby Ogdin – keyboards
- Bobby Wood – keyboards
- Pete Bordonali – guitars
- Steve Gibson – guitars
- Reggie Young – guitars
- Joe Osborn – bass
- Steve Schaffer – bass
- Jack Williams – bass
- Jerry Carrigan – drums
- Kenny Malone – drums
- Farrell Morris – percussion
- Brown Bannister – bells
- Denis Solee – saxophones
- Billy Puett – horns
- Buddy Skipper – horns
- Don Sheffield – horns
- The Shelly Kurland Strings – strings
- Archie Jordan – arrangements
- Bergen White – arrangements

=== Production ===
- Chris Christian – producer
- Lanny Avery – engineer
- Brown Bannister – engineer
- Shannon Smith – engineer
- Travis Turk – engineer
- Glenn Meadows – mastering at Masterfonics (Nashville, Tennessee)
- Dennis Ivy – cover photography
- Phil Van Duivendyk – center photography
- Mark Pleasant – back photography
- Buddy Huey – liner notes

== Charts ==
=== Radio singles ===
Year	Singles	Peak positions
Year	Singles	CCM AC
1978	"Sail On"	3
1979	"Water Grave"	14

== Accolades ==
Grammy Awards

Year	Winner	Category
1978	Sail On	Best Gospel Performance, Contemporary or Inspirational

GMA Dove Awards

- 1978 Male Group of the Year
