= This Year's Model (Imperials album) =

Studio album by The Imperials
- Released: 1987
- Recorded: 1986
- Studio: Ocean Way Recording (Los Angeles, California); OmniSound Studios and Center Stage Studio (Nashville, Tennessee); The Bennett House (Franklin, Tennessee; The Reelsound Remote Bus (Austin, Texas); Blue Jay Studios (Carlisle, Massachusetts)
- Genre: CCM; Christian pop; Christian rock
- Length: 43:51
- Label: Myrrh/Word
- Producer: Brown Bannister

The Imperials chronology
Let the Wind Blow (1985)	This Year's Model (1987)	Free the Fire (1988)

This Year's Model is the 32nd studio album by Christian music vocal group The Imperials, released in 1987 on Myrrh Records. This is the first album to feature new members Jimmie Lee Sloas and Ron Hemby, replacing long-time tenor Jim Murray and lead singer Paul Smith. It was a change in direction as This Year's Model's sound was more rock-oriented alienating long-time fans of the Imperials' four-part harmony of their early years. The track "Power of God" became a theme song for Christian bodybuilders the Power Team and new younger fans began to come to Imperials concerts. Production duties were done by Brown Bannister, who produced their previous album Let the Wind Blow (1985) with songwriting contributions from fellow CCM acts Pam Mark Hall, Chris Eaton and Paul Smith who co-wrote the lead single "Wings of Love". This Year's Model peaked at number 3 on the Billboard Top Inspirational Albums chart.

== Track listing ==
No.	Title	Writer(s)	Length
1.	"Holding On (First Love)"	Pam Mark Hall, Keith Thomas	5:22
2.	"Fallin'"	Jimmie Lee Sloas	4:03
3.	"Warriors"	Chris Eaton	4:54
4.	"How Do I Get You?"	Mark Gendel, Bob Johnson	5:38
5.	"Wings of Love"	K. Thomas, Paul Smith	4:38
6.	"Power of God"	Ron Hemby, Tom Hemby	4:07
7.	"Outlander"	C. Eaton	6:47
8.	"Get Ready"	J. Lee Sloas	4:38
9.	"Devoted to You"	R. Hemby, Stephen Bashaw	3:44

== Personnel ==
The Imperials

- Jimmie Lee Sloas – tenor, co-lead vocals
- Ron Hemby – tenor, co-lead vocals
- David Will – baritone, vocals
- Armond Morales – bass, vocals

Musicians

- Peter Kaye – Fairlight programming
- Steve Schaffer – Synclavier programming
- Keith Thomas – keyboards (1, 2, 5, 8, 9), drum programming (1, 2, 5), rhythm track arrangements (1, 2, 5), additional keyboards (6)
- Shane Keister – Fairlight programming, additional keyboards (1), additional bass (1), keyboards (4, 7, 8), drums (4), drum programming (7), rhythm track arrangements (7)
- Carl Marsh – Fairlight programming, Fairlight III (1, 3)
- Chris Eaton – keyboards (3), drum programming (3)
- Rhett Lawrence – Fairlight programming, keyboards (6), drum programming (6), rhythm track arrangements (6)
- Robbie Buchanan – acoustic piano (9)
- Dann Huff – rhythm guitar (2), guitars (5)
- Mark Grendel – guitar solo (2), guitars (3, 4), rhythm track arrangements (4)
- Tom Hemby – guitars (6, 8, 9)
- Jimmie Lee Sloas – bass (2, 8), rhythm track arrangements (2, 4)
- Gary Lunn – fretless bass (4), bass (9)
- Paul Leim – drum overdubs (2), drums (8, 9)
- Lenny Castro – percussion (8)
- Mark Douthit – saxophone (3, 8)
- Barry Green – trombone (8)
- Mike Haynes – trumpet (8)
- Robert White Johnson – rhythm track arrangements (4)
- Pam Mark Hall – additional backing vocals (1)

Production

- Lynn Nichols – executive producer, jacket concept
- Brown Bannister – producer
- Steve MacMillan – rhythm track recording (1, 2, 4–9)
- Jeff Balding – overdub recording, rhythm track recording (3)
- James "JB" Baird – overdub recording
- Joe Schiff – rhythm track recording assistant (1, 2, 4–9)
- Billy Whittington – rhythm track recording assistant (3), second engineer
- Spencer Chrislu – second engineer
- Danny Johnston – second engineer
- Wade Jaynes – second engineer
- J.T. – second engineer
- Nick Froome – mixing
- Ed Goodreau – mix assistant
- Rob Jaczko – mix assistant
- Doug Sax – mastering at The Mastering Lab (Hollywood, California)
- Joan Tankersley – art direction, jacket concept
- Patrick Pollei – design
- Aaron Rapoport – front cover photography
- Ellen Schuster – back cover photography

== Critical reception ==
Professional ratings
Review scores
Source	Rating
AllMusic	4/5 stars

Evan Cater of AllMusic praised This Year's Model saying that "the four male vocalists donned leather jackets, laced their hair with styling gel, backed their act with all the musical technology available in the '80s, wrapped it up in shimmering space-themed art direction, and generally sent the message to church youth groups nationwide that this was not their fathers' Imperials. The ultra-sleek pop production, replete with sweeping synthesizers, gritty bass runs, and rockin' electric guitar solos, was courtesy of Brown Bannister, who brought the same big, electronic sound to other '80s CCM records like Michael W. Smith's 'The Big Picture', Amy Grant's 'Unguarded', and Charlie Peacock's 'Secret of Time.' As it turned out, 'This Year's Model' was aptly titled. The album was probably destined to be a period piece, but some of the songs, like the opening 'Holding On (First Love)' and the breakdanceable 'Fallin',' hold up surprisingly well over the years."

== Charts ==
Chart (1987)	Peak position
US Top Inspirational Albums (Billboard)	3

=== Year-end charts ===
Chart (1987)	Position
US Inspirational Albums (Billboard)	8

=== Radio singles ===
Year	Singles	Peak positions	
Year	Singles	CCM AC	CCM CHR
1987	"Wings of Love"	1	2
1987	"Get Ready"	4	10
1987	"How Do I Get You?"	—	14
1987	"Holding On (First Love)"	23	3
1987	"Fallin'"	—	6
1987	"Devoted to You"	7	—
