= Heed the Call =

Studio album by the Imperials
- Released: March 1979
- Studio: Gold Mine Studio, Nashville, Tennessee
- Genre: Contemporary Christian music; gospel; inspirational
- Length: 39:02
- Label: DaySpring/Word Records
- Producer: Chris Christian

The Imperials chronology
Imperials Live (1978)	Heed the Call (1979)	One More Song for You (1979)

Professional ratings
Review scores
Source	Rating
AllMusic	2/5 stars

Heed the Call is the 25th studio album by Christian music group the Imperials, released in 1979 on DaySpring Records. The group won their third Grammy Award for Best Gospel Performance, Contemporary or Inspirational for their album Heed the Call at the 22nd Grammy Awards and were named Male Group of the Year at the 11th GMA Dove Awards. The track "Praise the Lord" won Song of the Year the following year given to its writers Brown Bannister and Mike Hudson at the 12th GMA Dove Awards. The Imperials were the first group to have a number-one song ("Oh Buddha") on all three of the following charts: Contemporary, Inspirational, and Southern gospel. Heed the Call debuted and peaked at number 3 on Billboard magazine's inaugural Top Inspirational Albums chart on March 29, 1980.

== Track listing ==
No.	Title	Writer(s)	Length
1.	"Overcomer"	James Hollihan, Jr.	3:37
2.	"Praise the Lord"	Brown Bannister, Mike Hudson	3:35
3.	"Oh Buddha"	Mark Farrow	3:28
4.	"Old Man's Rubble"	B. Bannister	3:15
5.	"Heed the Call"	Chris Christian, Paul Smith	3:01
6.	"Let Jesus Do It"	Steven Ferguson	3:27
7.	"Growing Stronger"	J. Hollihan, Jr.	3:29
8.	"First Morning in Heaven"	C. Christian	2:41
9.	"Whenever I Speak His Name"	Russ Taff, Tori Taff	4:33
10.	"My Mind Forgets a Million Things"	B. Bannister, M. Hudson	3:48
11.	"He Didn't Lift Us Up to Let Us Down"	Phil Johnson	3:21

== Personnel ==
The Imperials

- Russ Taff – lead vocals
- Jim Murray – tenor, vocals
- David Will – baritone, vocals
- Armond Morales – bass, vocals

== Charts ==
Chart (1980)	Peak position
US Top Inspirational Albums (Billboard)	3

=== Radio singles ===
Year	Singles	Peak positions
Year	Singles	CCM AC
1979	"Praise the Lord"	2
1979	"Oh Buddha"	1
1979	"Overcomer"	15

== Accolades ==
Grammy Awards

Year	Winner	Category
1980	Heed the Call	Best Gospel Performance, Contemporary or Inspirational

GMA Dove Awards

- 1980 Male Group of the Year
