= Love's Still Changing Hearts =

Studio album by The Imperials
- Released: 1990
- Recorded: 1989
- Studio: River North Studios, Chicago, Illinois; Home Boy Studios, Evanston, Illinois; Reflections Studios, Nashville, Tennessee
- Genre: CCM; Christian pop; R&B
- Length: 55:31
- Label: Star Song Records
- Producer: Morris "Butch" Stewart

The Imperials chronology
Free the Fire (1988)	Love's Still Changing Hearts (1990)	Big God (1991)

Love's Still Changing Hearts is the 34th studio album by Christian music vocal group The Imperials released in 1990. This is the first album recorded on the Star Song label. This album's personnel line-up consists of Armond Morales, David Will, Ron Hemby and David Robertson. Robertson replaced Jimmie Lee Sloas in 1989 but only for this album as he would leave the group for a solo career. This is also Ron Hemby's final album with the group as both Hemby and Robertson were replaced by new tenor leads Jonathan Pierce and Jason Beddoe. Beddoe replaced Hemby but he left the group but Pierce would stay on to record their next album. Former member Sloas co-wrote the track "Goin' Away." The album's final track is a near-9 minute medley of six of the Imperials' best beloved songs and a cover of "Gospel Ship" called "Platinum Medley." Love's Still Changing Hearts peaked at number 3 on the Billboard Top Christian Albums chart.

== Track listing ==
No.	Title	Writer(s)	Length
1.	"Big Ball Turning"	Morris "Butch" Stewart, Brenda Blonski	5:21
2.	"Love Can Make It Happen"	M. Stewart, B. Blonski, Brenda Mitchell Stewart	4:42
3.	"Come Into My Life"	Paul Chiten, Pamela Phillips-Oland	4:38
4.	"Original Love"	Keith Brown	4:40
5.	"I Will Follow You"	David Robertson, John Wierick	4:51
6.	"It's Raining Again"	D. Robertson	4:45
7.	"It's Gonna Be Alright"	Ron Hemby	4:51
8.	"Love's Still Changing Hearts"	Tom Hemby, Justin Peters	4:31
9.	"Come Let Us Worship"	D. Robertson, J. Wierick	4:44
10.	"Goin' Away"	Jimmie Lee Sloas, Tim Norris	3:44
11.	"Platinum Medley: Higher Power/Lord of the Harvest/One More Song for You/Let the Wind Blow/Gospel Ship/Sail On/Trumpet of Jesus"	D. Correll, P. Smith, J. Newton Howard, M. Omartian, S. Omartian, D. Martin, P. Naish, M. LeFevre, C. Christian	8:54

== Personnel ==
The Imperials

- David Robertson - tenor, co-lead vocals
- Ron Hemby – tenor, co-lead vocals
- David Will – baritone, vocals
- Armond Morales – bass, vocals

Musicians

- Neil Artwick – synthesizers
- Chris Cameron – synthesizers, Hammond B3 organ
- Morris "Butch" Stewart – synthesizers, sequencing, backing vocals, all arrangements
- Thaddis "Kuk" Harrell – sequencing
- David Barrett – acoustic guitar
- Billy Panda – acoustic guitar
- Richie Davis – electric guitar
- Peter Lerner – electric guitar
- Ronald Hall – bass
- Wayne Stewart – drums
- Steve Eisen – baritone saxophone, tenor saxophone
- James Perkins – alto saxophone, tenor saxophone
- Michael Halpin – trombone
- Grant Cramer – trumpet
- Mark Ohlsen – trumpet
- Diane Louie – original arrangements (5, 6, 9)
- Kim Fleming – backing vocals, guest vocals (6)
- Vicki Hampton – backing vocals
- Jason Morales – backing vocals
- Tanya Goodman-Sykes – backing vocals

Production

- Jeff Moseley – executive producer
- Armond Morales – executive producer
- Morris "Butch" Stewart – producer
- Paul Klingberg – recording
- Larry Millas – recording
- Nick Froome – mixing at Sixteenth Avenue Sound (Nashville, Tennessee)
- Scott Ahaus – second engineer
- John David Parker – second engineer
- Tom Russo – second engineer
- Graham Lewis – third engineer
- Georgetown Masters (Nashville, Tennessee) – mastering location
- Jackson Design – art direction, design
- Russ Harrington – photography

== Charts ==
Chart (1990)	Peak position
US Top Christian Albums (Billboard)	3

=== Year-end charts ===
Chart (1990)	Position
US Top Christian Albums (Billboard)	12

=== Radio singles ===
Year	Singles	Peak positions	
Year	Singles	CCM AC	CCM CHR
1990	"Big Ball Turning"	—	2
1990	"It's Raining Again"	1	—
1990	"I Will Follow You"	3	—
1990	"It's Gonna Be Alright"	—	4
1990	"Come Into My Life"	1	12
1990–91	"Come Let Us Worship"	5	—
1991	"Original Love"	9	13
