= Side by Side (Imperials album) =

- Main front cover featuring Jim Murray (left) and David Will

Studio album by The Imperials
- Released: 1983
- Studios: Soundshop (Nashville, Tennessee); Sound Stage (Nashville, Tennessee); Bullet Recording (Nashville, Tennessee); Creative Workshop (Berry Hill, Tennessee); The Gold Mine (Brentwood, Tennessee)
- Genres: Contemporary Christian music; Christian pop; inspirational
- Length: 1:16:22
- Label: DaySpring/Word Records
- Producer: Keith Thomas: Neal Joseph

The Imperials chronology
Stand by the Power (1982)	Side by Side (1983)	The Imperials Sing the Classics (1984)

Alternative cover
- Back cover featuring Armond Morales (left) and Paul Smith

Side by Side is the 29th studio album by Christian music vocal group The Imperials, released in 1983 on DaySpring Records. It is the Imperials' first double album to feature each member taking a solo side. On lead singer Paul Smith's side, it features a duet between Smith and a new female CCM singer-songwriter named Leslie Phillips on the track "Make My Heart Your Home." Phillips had just released her debut album Beyond Saturday Night that same year. In 1984, the album was nominated for a Grammy Award for Best Gospel Performance by a Duo or Group at the 26th Grammy Awards and at the 15th GMA Dove Awards, the group won their final Dove Award for Pop/Contemporary Album of the Year. Side by Side peaked at number 10 on Billboard's Top Inspirational Albums chart.

== Track listing ==
Jim Murray; produced by Neal Joseph

No.	Title	Writer(s)	Length
1.	"Sound His Praise"	Melodie Tunney	3:01
2.	"Even the Praise Comes from You"	Claire Cloninger, Lynn Keesecker	2:35
3.	"Behold the Man"	David Baroni, Niles Borop	4:00
4.	"Built to Last"	Steven Curtis Chapman	3:43
5.	"I Need to Feel Your Touch Again"	Tricia Walker	4:12

David Will; produced by Neal Joseph and Keith Thomas

No.	Title	Writer(s)	Length
1.	"All I Need"	Paul Smith, John Rosasco	4:21
2.	"You're the Only Jesus"	Gordon Jensen	4:08
3.	"Best of My Life"	P. Smith, K. Thomas	3:34
4.	"Jesus Never Fails"	Gary Driskell	4:13
5.	"Through Your Eyes"	Billy Smiley, Bob Farrell	3:57

Armond Morales; produced by Neal Joseph

No.	Title	Writer(s)	Length
1.	"Good Shepherd"	P. Smith, Dick Tunney	2:47
2.	"Keepin' My Eyes on You"	Twila Paris	2:59
3.	"Once and For All"	C. Cloninger, L. Keesecker	2:57
4.	"They See God There"	Dan Keen, Jim Weber	2:40
5.	"Great Is Your Faithfulness"	T. Walker, Dawn Rodgers	4:37

Paul Smith; produced by Keith Thomas

No.	Title	Writer(s)	Length
1.	"Wait Upon the Lord"	P. Smith, K. Thomas, Ragan Courtney	4:24
2.	"Here on the Rock"	P. Smith, K. Thomas	4:23
3.	"Make My Heart Your Home" (duet with Leslie Phillips)	P. Smith, K. Thomas	3:53
4.	"Promise to Promise"	P. Smith, K. Thomas	4:06
5.	"All Because You Love Me"	P. Smith, Scott Wesley Brown, Phil Naish	4:58

== Personnel ==
The Imperials

- Paul Smith – lead vocals, backing vocals (17, 20)
- Jim Murray – tenor, lead vocals
- David Will – baritone, lead vocals
- Armond Morales – bass, lead vocals

Musicians

- Mitch Humphries – acoustic piano (1–5), Rhodes Chroma (1)
- Dick Tunney – Fender Rhodes (1–3, 5), Wurlitzer electric piano (4)
- Keith Thomas – acoustic piano (6, 7, 9, 10), backing vocals (6–9, 17), Fender Rhodes (7, 8, 10), synthesizers (8, 10, 17), keyboards (16, 18–20), vocoder (16, 17)
- David Huntsinger – acoustic piano (11, 13, 14), Fender Rhodes (11–14)
- Alan Steinberger – synthesizers (11, 12)
- Tricia Walker – acoustic piano (15)
- Jon Goin – guitars (1–5, 11, 12, 17, 19, 20), guitar solo (8)
- Dann Huff – lead guitar (6), guitars (8, 9, 16, 18, 19, 20), "midget" guitar (16), guitar solo (17)
- Bruce Dees – guitars (6, 10), electric guitar (7)
- Brent Rowan – guitars (6, 10, 13–15), acoustic guitar (7)
- Mike Brignardello – bass (1–5, 8, 9, 20)
- Bob Wray – bass (6, 7, 10)
- Gary Lunn – bass (11–15)
- David Hungate – bass (16)
- Jimmie Lee Sloas – bass (17–19)
- Mark Hammond – drums (1–3, 5, 8, 16)
- Larrie Londin – drums (7, 9–14, 17, 19)
- David Huff – drums (18)
- Farrell Morris – percussion (1–5, 11–15)
- Terry McMillan – percussion (6, 8, 9, 16–19)
- Sam Levine – saxophone solo (10)
- Mark Douthit – saxophone (19)
- Bobby Taylor – oboe (15)
- Cindy Reynolds – harp (15)
- Terry Mead – flugelhorn (16)
- Ronn Huff – string arrangements (1–3, 5)
- Alan Moore – string arrangements (7, 9, 10)
- Don Hart – string arrangements (12, 13, 15)
- John Darnall – string arrangements (18, 20)
- The Kris Wilkinson Strings – strings (1–3, 5, 7, 9, 10, 12, 13, 15, 18, 20)
- Beverly Darnall – backing vocals (1, 2, 4, 9)
- Neal Joseph – backing vocals (1, 2, 4, 7, 8, 12)
- Melodie Tunney – backing vocals (1, 2, 4, 7, 9, 12, 14, 20)
- Steve Green – backing vocals (6, 7, 8)
- Gary Pigg – backing vocals (6)
- Beverly Baxter – backing vocals (12)
- Donna McElroy – backing vocals (14, 19)
- Steve Taylor – backing vocals (14)
- Marty McCall – backing vocals (17, 19)
- Leslie Phillips – lead vocals (18)
- Patti Leatherwood – backing vocals (19)
- Denny Henson – backing vocals (20)

Production

- Neal Joseph – producer (1–15)
- Keith Thomas – producer (11–20)
- Jeff Balding – engineer
- Scott Hendricks – engineer
- Jim Baird – engineer (1–15)
- Travis Turk – engineer (1–5, 16–20)
- Steve Fralick – engineer (6–10, 16–20)
- Brent King – engineer (6–15)
- Danny Mundhenk – engineer (6–10), assistant engineer (11–20)
- Kyle Lehning – engineer (16–20)
- Lee Groitzsch – assistant engineer (6–10)
- Phil Diehl – assistant engineer (11–20)
- Hank Williams – mastering at MasterMix (Nashville, Tennessee)
- Bill Brunt – album design
- Mark Tucker – photography

== Charts ==
Chart (1983)	Peak position
US Top Inspirational Albums (Billboard)	10

=== Radio singles ===
Year	Singles	Peak positions
Year	Singles	CCM AC
1983	"Wait Upon the Lord" (Paul Smith)	2
1983	"You're the Only Jesus" (David Will)	20
1984	"Make My Heart Your Home" (Paul Smith & Leslie Phillips)	13

== Accolades ==
GMA Dove Awards

Year	Winner	Category
1984	Side by Side	Pop/Contemporary Album of the Year
