= Evangelism =

Preaching the Gospel of Jesus Christ

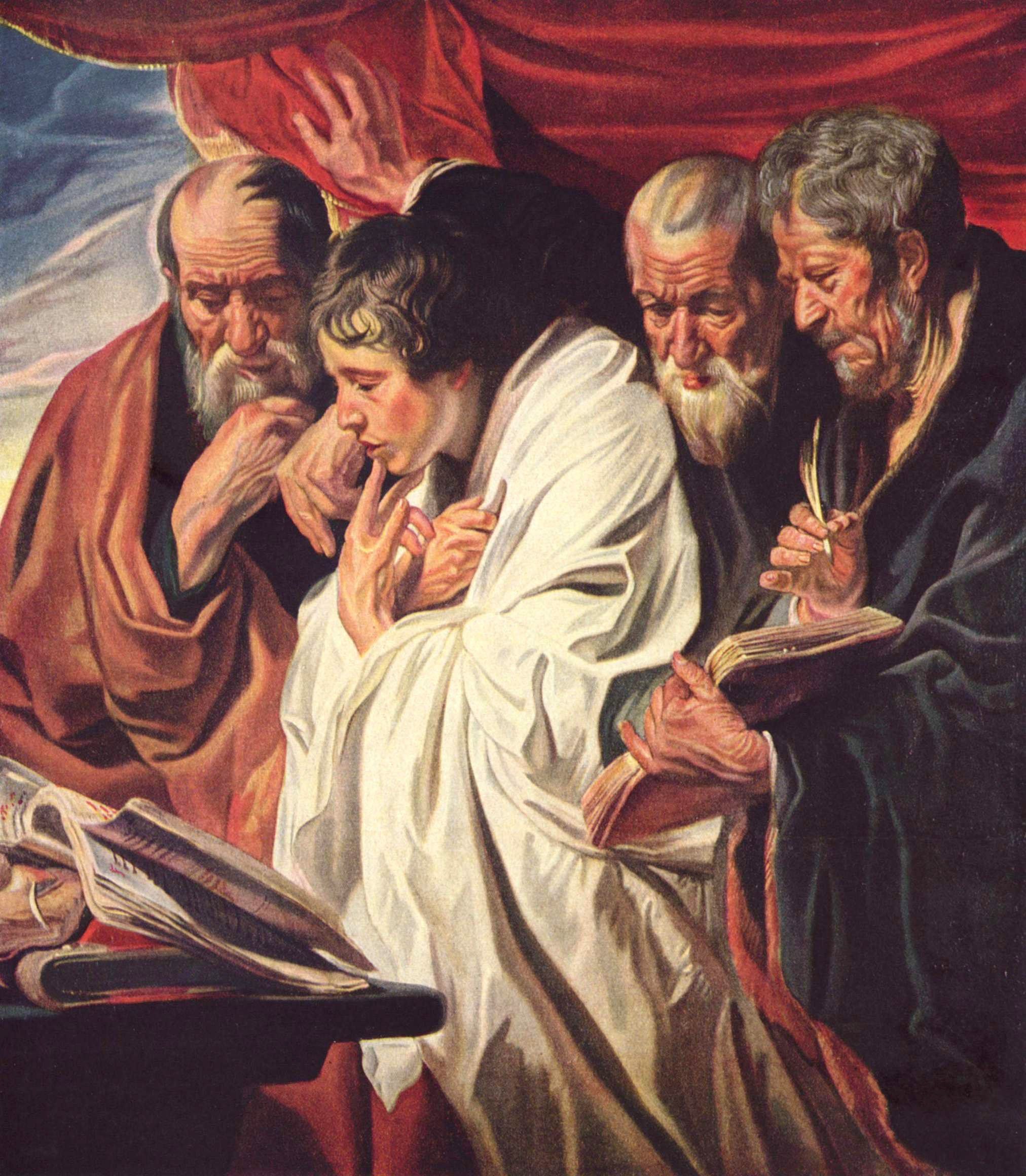
The Four Evangelists

Evangelism, evangelisation (evangelization in American English), or witnessing, is the act of sharing the Christian gospel, the message and teachings of Jesus Christ. It is typically done with the intention of converting others to Christianity. (Note: Such intentions may be regarded as proselytising, which is illegal in many countries.) Evangelism can take several forms, such as personal conversations, preaching, media, and is especially associated with missionary work.

Christians who specialize in evangelism are often known as evangelists, whether they are in their home communities or living as missionaries in the field, although some Christian traditions refer to such people as missionaries in either case. Some Christian traditions recognize evangelists as holding a designated leadership role, with responsibilities that may include preaching at large gatherings and serving in church governance. In addition, Christian groups who encourage evangelism are sometimes known as evangelistic.

== Etymology ==
The word evangelist comes from the Koine Greek word εὐαγγέλιον (transliterated as euangelion) via Latinised evangelium as used in the canonical titles of the Four Gospels, attributed to Matthew, Mark, Luke, and John (also known as the Four Evangelists). The Greek word εὐαγγέλιον originally meant a reward given to the messenger for good news (εὔ = "good", ἀγγέλλω = "I bring a message"; the word "angel" comes from the same root) and later "good news" itself.

The verb form of euangelion, (translated as "evangelism"), occurs rarely in older Greek literature outside the New Testament, making its meaning more difficult to ascertain. Parallel texts of the Gospels of Luke and Mark reveal a synonymous relationship between the verb euangelizo (εὑαγγελίζω) and a Greek verb kerusso (κηρύσσω), which means "to proclaim".

== New Testament ==
The calling of some believers to be evangelists, others "to be apostles, some prophets, ... and some pastors and teachers" is explained by Paul the Apostle in Ephesians 4:11.

== Methods ==
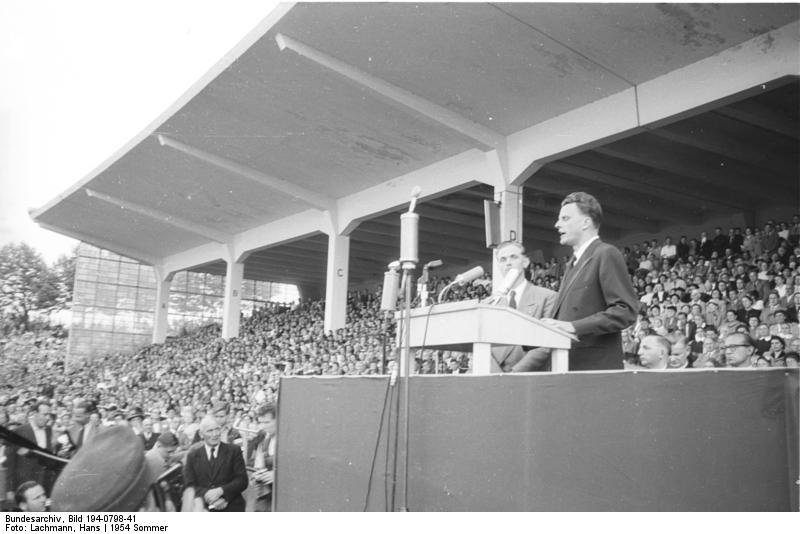
Billy Graham in Düsseldorf (1954)

Common forms of evangelism include preaching or distributing Bibles; in tracts, newspapers, and magazines; through the electronic media; and by street evangelists. The Bible records that Jesus sent out his disciples to evangelize by visiting people's homes in pairs of two believers (cf. Luke 10:1–12). In the same text, Jesus mentioned that few people were willing to evangelize, despite there being many people who would be receptive to his Gospel message.

The child evangelism movement, which focuses on evangelizing children between the ages of 4 and 14 years old, originated in the 20th century. Beginning in the 1970s, a group of Christian athletes known as The Power Team spawned an entire genre of Christian entertainment based on strong-man exploits mixed with a Christian message and usually accompanied by an opportunity to respond with a prayer for salvation. New opportunities for evangelism have been provided in recent decades by increased travel opportunities and by instant communications over the internet.

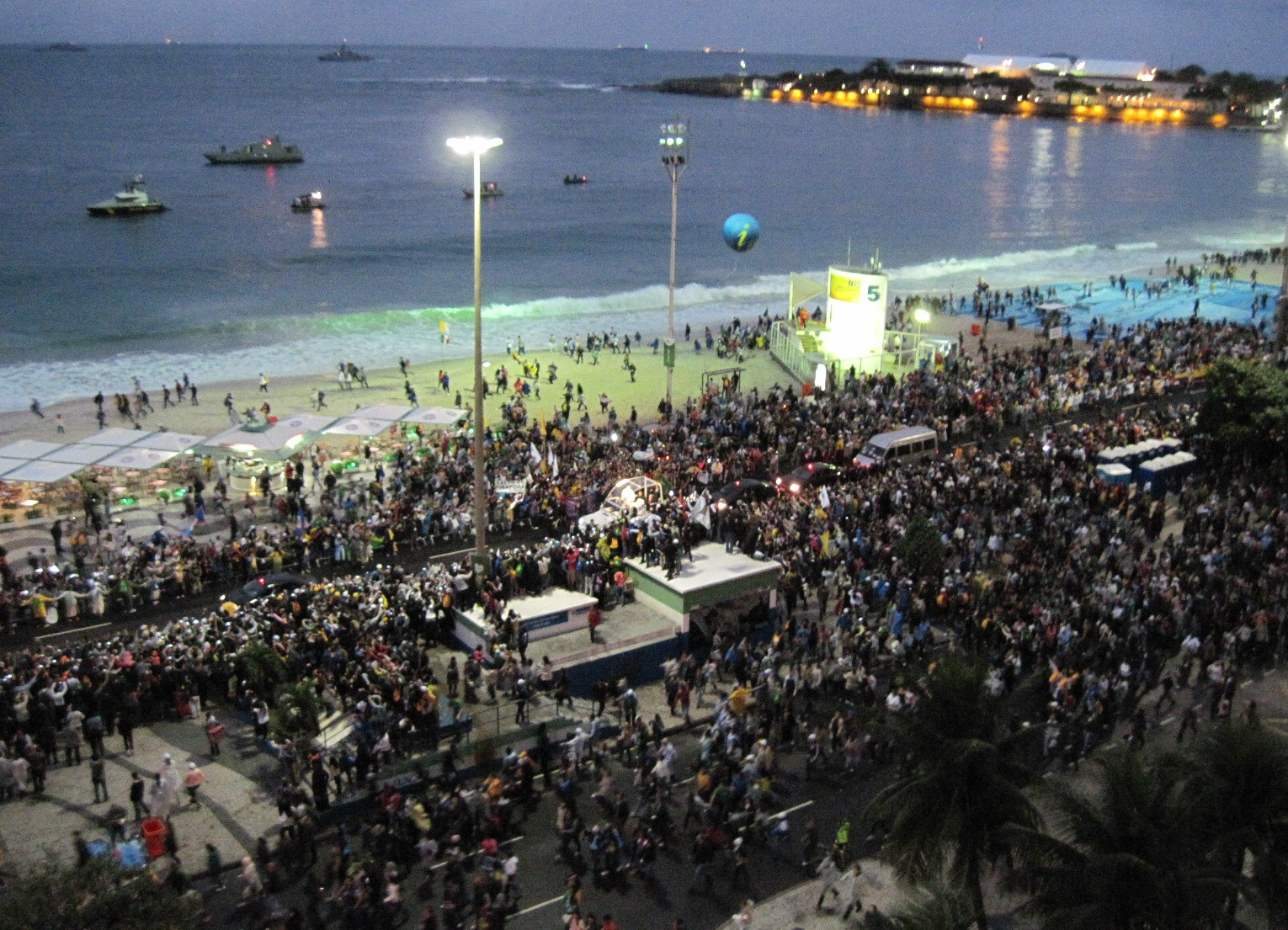
World Youth Day, an evangelistic event, in Copacabana, Rio de Janeiro, Brazil, in 2013.

== Denominational practice ==
=== Catholicism ===
Proclaiming the Gospel is not an exclusively clerical role, but it is highlighted by the Catholic Church as "a sacred duty" which priests are required to perform:

They [priests] perform the sacred duty of preaching the Gospel, so that the offering of the people can be made acceptable and sanctified by the Holy Spirit. Through the apostolic proclamation of the Gospel, the People of God are called together and assembled.

=== Protestantism ===
In 1831, the Presbyterian Mission Agency was founded by the Presbyterian Church in the United States of America.

==== Evangelicalism ====
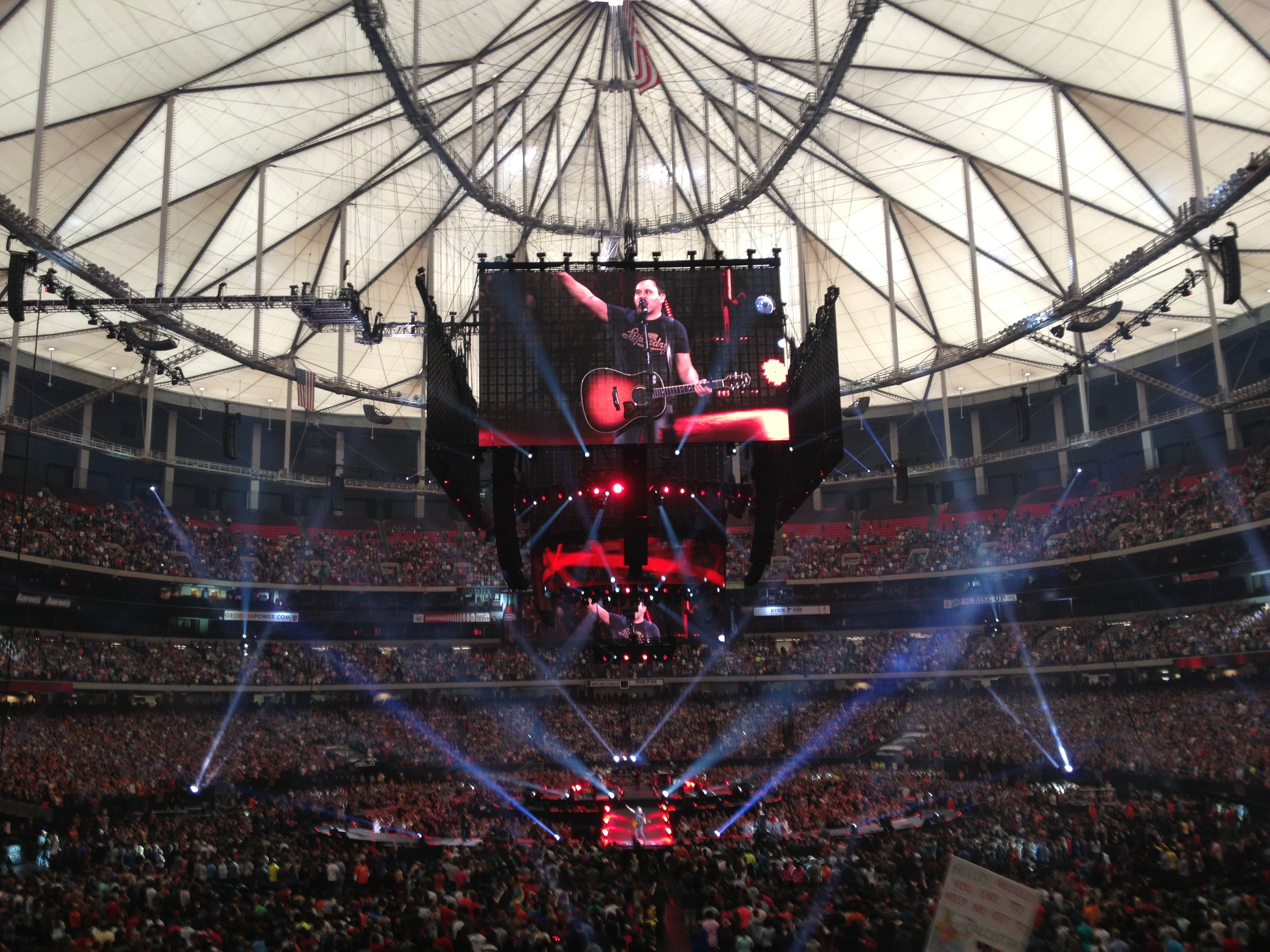
Passion Conferences, a music and evangelism festival at Georgia Dome in Atlanta, Georgia, United States, in 2013

Various evangelical mission organizations have specialized in evangelism throughout history. In 1792, BMS World Mission was founded in Kettering, England by William Carey. In 1814, the American Baptist International Ministries was founded by the American Baptist Churches USA in United States. In 1865, OMF International was founded by Hudson Taylor in England. In 1893, in Lagos in Nigeria, SIM was founded by Walter Gowans, Rowland Bingham, and Thomas Kent. Samuel E. Hill, John H. Nicholson, and William J. Knights founded Gideons International, an organization which distributes free Bibles to hotels, motels, hospitals, military bases, prisons, schools, and universities, in Janesville in Wisconsin, United States, in 1899.

In 1922, Canadian evangelical evangelist Aimee Semple McPherson, founder of the Foursquare Church, was the first woman to use radio to reach a wider audience in the United States. In 1951, producer Dick Ross and Baptist evangelist Billy Graham founded the film production company World Wide Pictures, which would make videos of his preaching and Christian films.

In 1960, more than half of the Protestant American missionaries were evangelical. American and European Pentecostal missionaries are also numerous, Pentecostalism can develop independently by non-foreign residents in various regions of the world, notably in Africa, South America, and Asia. Youth with a Mission was founded in 1960 in United States by Loren Cunningham and his wife Darlene.

The Christian Broadcasting Network was founded in 1961 in Virginia Beach, United States, by Baptist minister Pat Robertson.

In 1974, Billy Graham and the Lausanne Committee for World Evangelization organized the First International Congress on World Evangelization in Lausanne.

In July 1999, TopChrétien, an evangelical Christian web portal and social network, was launched by Éric Célérier, pastor of the Assemblies of God of France and Estelle Martin.

In 2004, South Korea became the second-largest source of missionaries in the world, after the United States and ahead of England.

In January 2007, GodTube, a site for sharing videos related to Christianity, especially evangelical, was founded by Christopher Wyatt of Plano, Texas, in the United States, then a student at Dallas Theological Seminary.

In 2007, there were over 10,000 Baptist missionaries in overseas missions around the world.

== Controversies ==
Some consider evangelism to be proselytising, which is protected in the United States but illegal in some countries, while others where it is suppressed argue it is merely free speech. The fact that evangelicals speak about their faith in public is sometimes criticized by the media and it is often associated with proselytism. According to the evangelicals, freedom of religion and freedom of expression allow them to discuss their faith like they would discuss other topics.

Christian films made by American evangelical production companies are also regularly associated with proselytism. According to Sarah-Jane Murray, screenwriting teacher at the US Film and Christian Television Commission United, Christian films are works of art, not proselytism. For Hubert de Kerangat, communications manager at SAJE Distribution, a distributor of these American Christian films in France, if Christian films are considered proselytism, all films are a form of proselytism, since films of all genres could each be said to carry a message.

== See also ==
- 10/40 Window
- Dawah
- Open-air preaching
- Religious conversion
- Technology evangelist
- The night of churches
