= Imperials Live =

Live album by the Imperials
- Released: 1978
- Venue: First Baptist Church, Waco, Texas; The Kingsland Theatre, St. Louis, Missouri
- Genre: Contemporary Christian music; gospel; inspirational
- Length: 41:16
- Label: DaySpring/Word Records
- Producer: Chris Christian, Armond Morales, Buddy Huey

The Imperials chronology
Sail On (1977)	Imperials Live (1978)	Heed the Call (1979)

Imperials Live is a 1978 live album by Christian music vocal group the Imperials, released on DaySpring Records

Imperials Live was recorded at two venues: First Baptist Church in Waco, Texas and at The Kingsland Theatre in St. Louis, Missouri to promote their 1977 album Sail On. There are three songs that were recorded from 1976 that resulted in The Lost Album (2006) that the Imperials performed live for this album: "Sonshiny Day," "New Creation" and "I Love The Way You Love." The album was nominated for a Grammy Award for Best Gospel Performance, Contemporary or Inspirational at the 21st Grammy Awards. Imperials Live has never been released on CD.

== Track listing ==
No.	Title	Writer(s)	Length
1.	"Sonshiny Day"	Ken Medema	2:34
2.	"Bread Upon the Water"	Bill Grine, Janny Grine	3:16
3.	"Bread Upon the Water" (Reprise)	B. Grine, J. Grine	0:52
4.	"New Creation"	Russ Taff	5:47
5.	"Your First Day in Heaven"	Stuart Hamblen	1:39
6.	"Lead Me Gently Home Father"	Will L. Thompson; arranged by Armond Morales	3:17
7.	"I Love The Way You Love"	John Lutz	4:09
8.	"He Touched Me"	Bill Gaither	3:53
9.	"Sail On"	Chris Christian	5:03
10.	"How Great Thou Art"	Stuart K. Hine	2:40
11.	"The Old Gospel Ship"	Traditional; arranged by A. Morales	3:07
12.	"The Old Gospel Ship" (Reprise)	Traditional; arranged by A. Morales	1:42

== Personnel ==
The Imperials

- Russ Taff – lead vocals
- Jim Murray – tenor, vocals
- David Will – baritone, vocals
- Armond Morales – bass, vocals
