= Grammy Award for Best Gospel Performance, Contemporary =

Music award category

- Awarded for: quality contemporary performances in the gospel music genre
- Country: United States
- Presented by: National Academy of Recording Arts and Sciences
- First award: 1978
- Final award: 1983
- Website: grammy.com

The Grammy Award for Best Gospel Performance, Contemporary was awarded from 1978 to 1983. From 1978 to 1982 it was titled the Grammy Award for Best Gospel Performance Contemporary or Inspirational. Before and after this time from 1968 to 1977 and from 2005 this category was a part of the Grammy Award for Best Gospel/Contemporary Christian Music Performance.

Years reflect the year in which the Grammy Awards were presented, for works released in the previous year.

== Recipients ==
Year	Performing artist	Work	Nominees	Ref.
1978	The Imperials	Sail On	Reba Rambo-Gardner - Lady; Larry Hart - Hart and Soul; Michael Omartian - Adam Again; Gary S. Paxton - More from the Astonishing, Outrageous, Amazing, Incredible, Unbelievable Gary S. Paxton; Evie Tornquist - Mirror	
1979	Larry Hart	"What a Friend"	Evie - Come On, Ring Those Bells; The Imperials - Imperials Live; McGuire - Destined To Be Yours; Reba - The Lady Is A Child	
1980	The Imperials	Heed the Call	Andrus, Blackwood and Company - Following You; Amy Grant - My Father's Eyes; Dan Peek - "All Things Are Possible"; Evie - Never the Same	
1981	The Archers, Cynthia Clawson, Andraé Crouch, Tramaine Hawkins, Walter Hawkins, Dony McGuire, Reba Rambo, and B. J. Thomas	The Lord's Prayer	Andraé Crouch - "It's Gonna Rain"; Amy Grant - Never Alone; The Imperials - One More Song for You; Michael and Stormie Omartian - "The Builder"	
1982	The Imperials	Priority	The Archers - Spreadin' Like Wildfire; Cynthia Clawson - Finest Hour; DeGarmo and Key - This Ain't Hollywood; Amy Grant - Amy Grant In Concert	
1983	Amy Grant	Age to Age	Andraé Crouch - "My Tribute"; The Imperials - Stand By the Power; Sandi Patty - Lift Up the Lord; Reba Rambo - "Lady Live"	
