= Priority (Imperials album) =

Studio album by The Imperials
- Released: 1980
- Studio: Jennifudy Studios, North Hollywood, CA
- Genre: Contemporary Christian music; Christian pop; inspirational
- Length: 39:39
- Label: DaySpring/Word Records
- Producer: Michael Omartian

The Imperials chronology
| Christmas with the Imperials (1980) | Priority (1980) | The Very Best of the Imperials (1981) |

Professional ratings
Review scores
| Source | Rating |
|---|---|
| AllMusic | 2/5 stars |

Priority is the 27th studio album by the Christian music group The Imperials, released in late 1980 on DaySpring Records. It is the second album that the group has collaborated with well-known musician/producer Michael Omartian, their first being their previous album One More Song for You (1979). In 1982, the Imperials won their fourth and, to date, final Grammy Award for Best Gospel Performance, Contemporary or Inspirational at the 24th Grammy Awards and at the 13th GMA Dove Awards, they were named Group of the Year and Priority was named Pop/Contemporary Album of the Year. Lead singer Russ Taff won his second Dove Award for Male Vocalist of the Year, winning back-to-back. Prior to the award ceremonies, Taff had left the group in 1981 to begin his solo career and started work on his debut album Walls of Glass (1983) before being replaced by Paul Smith as the new lead singer. Priority gave the Imperials their second number-one album on Billboard magazine's Top Inspirational Albums chart.

== Track listing ==
All music and lyrics by Michael and Stormie Omartian, except where noted.

| No. | Title | Writer(s) | Length |
|---|---|---|---|
| 1. | "The Trumpet of Jesus" | | 3:46 |
| 2. | "Finish What You Started" | Russ Taff, Tori Taff, Michael Omartian | 4:05 |
| 3. | "I'd Rather Believe in You" | | 3:37 |
| 4. | "Any Good Time at All" | | 4:02 |
| 5. | "Be Still My Soul" | Russ Taff, Tori Taff | 3:51 |
| 6. | "There's No Time Till You Take It" | | 4:09 |
| 7. | "Pieces" | | 4:06 |
| 8. | "Into My Life" | Beeb Birtles | 4:42 |
| 9. | "Seek Ye First" | | 5:00 |

== Personnel ==
The Imperials

- Russ Taff – lead vocals
- Jim Murray – tenor, vocals
- David Will – baritone, vocals
- Armond Morales – bass, vocals

Musicians

- Michael Omartian – keyboards
- Marty Walsh – guitars
- Abraham Laboriel – bass
- Paul Leim – drums
- Alex Acuña – congas
- Kim Hutchcroft – saxophones, sax solos
- Jackie Kelso – saxophones
- Dick Hyde – trombone
- Lew McCreary – trombone
- Chuck Findley – trumpet
- Steve Madaio – trumpet
- Assa Drori – concertmaster
- Myrna Matthews – additional backing vocals
- Marti McCall – additional backing vocals
- Stormie Omartian – additional backing vocals

Production

- Michael Omartian – producer, arrangements
- John Guess – engineer, remixing
- Ken Perry – mastering at Capitol Mastering (Hollywood, California)
- Yvonne Garcia – production coordinator
- Bob Anderson – layout, photography

== Charts ==
| Chart (1981) | Peak position |
|---|---|
| US Top Inspirational Albums (Billboard) | 1 |

=== Radio singles ===
| Year | Singles | Peak positions | |
| Year | Singles | CCM AC | CCM CHR |
|---|---|---|---|
| 1981 | "I'd Rather Believe in You" | 3 | 5 |
| 1981 | "Finish What You Started" | 2 | 2 |
| 1981 | "The Trumpet of Jesus" | 1 | 1 |
| 1981 | "Be Still My Soul | 7 | 19 |

== Accolades ==
Grammy Awards

| Year | Winner | Category |
|---|---|---|
| 1982 | Priority | Best Gospel Performance, Contemporary or Inspirational |

GMA Dove Awards

- 1982 Group of the Year

| Year | Winner | Category |
|---|---|---|
| 1982 | Priority | Pop/Contemporary Album of the Year |
| 1982 | Russ Taff (lead singer) | Male Vocalist of the Year |
