= The night of churches =

Christian festival

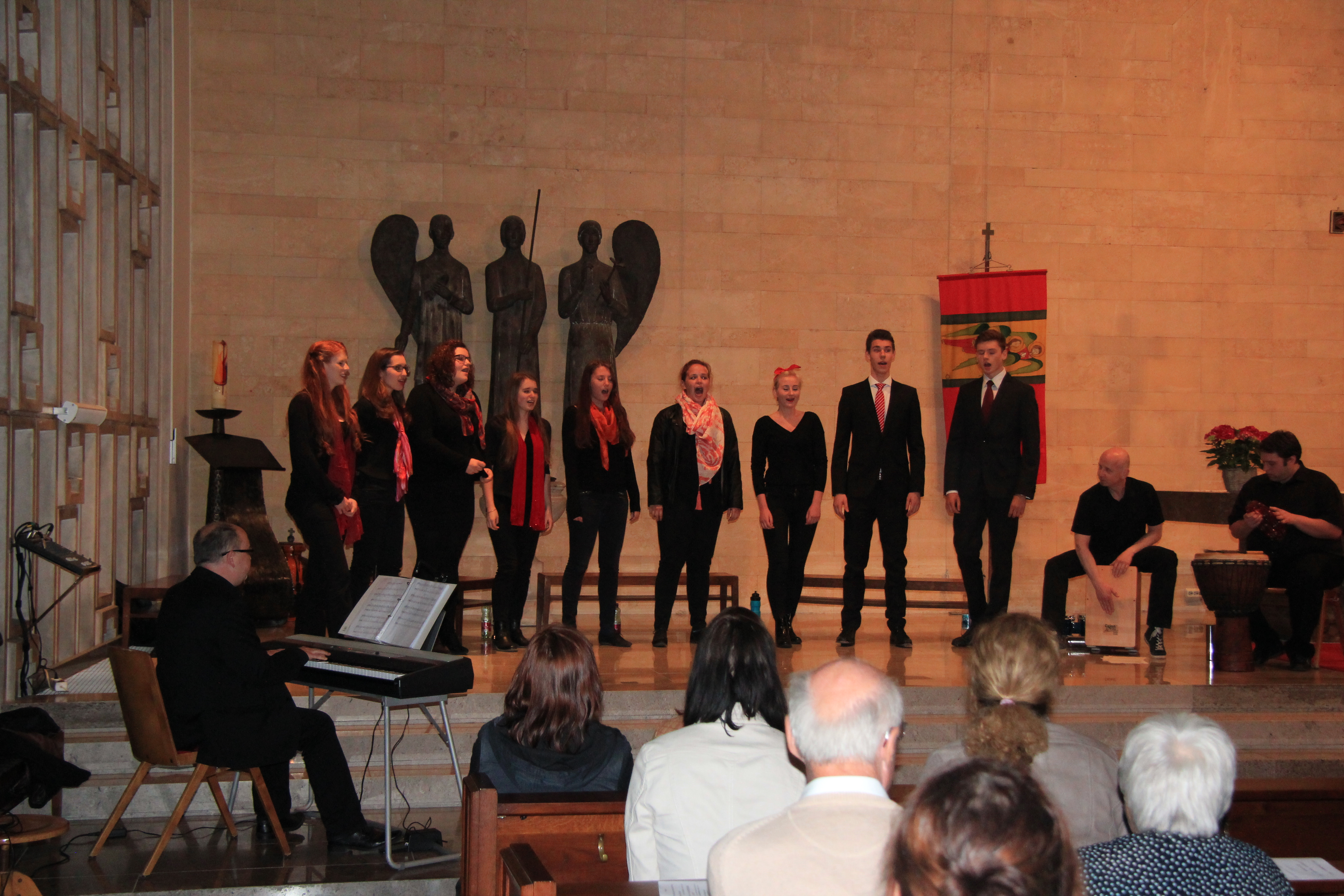
A church choir sings at a Christian church in Hinterbrühl

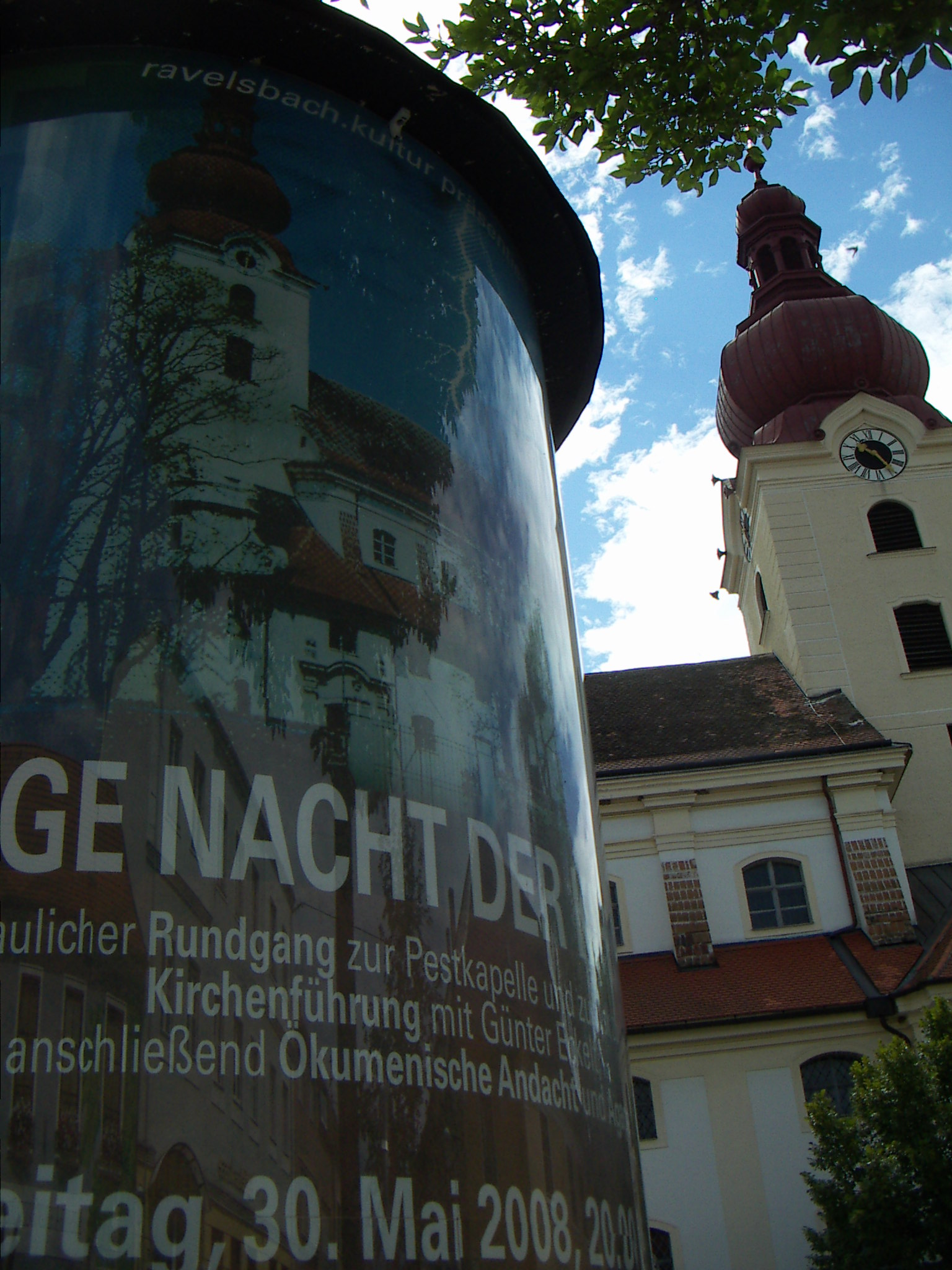
A promotional flier for the Night of Churches at Pfarrkirche Ravelsbach

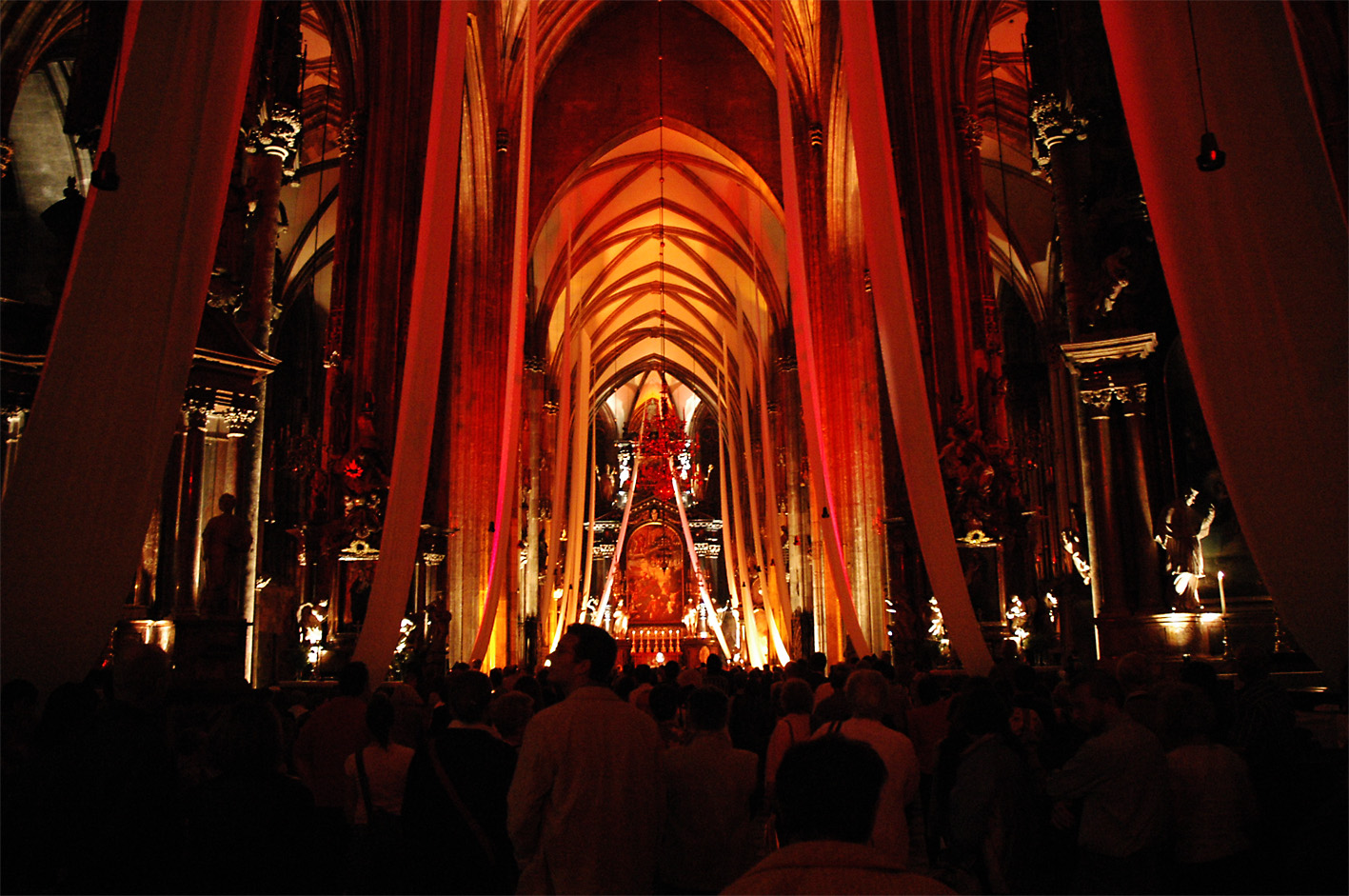
The Long Night of Churches in St. Stephen's Cathedral, Vienna

The night of churches or The long night of churches is an annual religious and cultural festival, organized by various Christian Churches. The main idea is that visitors can see sights (churches or chapels) without obligation and for free, and meet believers among many denominations.

== History ==
=== In Germany ===
The first long night of churches took place in Germany (Frankfurt and Hannover) in 2003. Since then it has been organized every year and expanded to more and more cities. Three years later there were 70 churches open in Hannover, receiving about 47,000 visitors.

=== In other countries ===
In 2005 the long night of churches took place in Vienna, Austria. Four years later the Diocese of Brno in the Czech Republic joined. In the following years the event has expanded to more European countries. It expanded to Slovakia in 2011.

== See also ==
- Christian culture
- Christian evangelism
