= The Imperials Sing the Classics =

Studio album by the Imperials
- Released: 1984
- Studios: Bullet Recording Studio, Nashville, Tennessee
- Genres: Contemporary Christian music; gospel; inspirational
- Length: 38:05
- Label: DaySpring/Word Records
- Producer: Neal Joseph

The Imperials chronology
Side by Side (1983)	The Imperials Sing the Classics (1984)	Let the Wind Blow (1985)

The Imperials Sing the Classics, also titled Sing the Classics, is a 1984 studio album by Christian music vocal group the Imperials. It is their final album on the DaySpring label as they switched to Word Records' Myrrh label for their next album Let the Wind Blow (1985). The Imperials Sing the Classics is the group's 30th studio album as they were celebrating their 20th year of music and ministry by singing four-part harmony, reminiscent of their early years. It is an album of covers singing classic contemporary Christian music songs from the 1970s and early 1980s with production by Neal Joseph and arranged and conducted by Don Hart. The album peaked at number 8 on the Billboard Top Inspirational Albums chart.

== Track listing ==
No.	Title	Writer(s)	Length
1.	"Home Where I Belong"	Pat Terry	3:28
2.	"We Are the Reason"	David Meece	4:00
3.	"Easter Song"	Annie Herring	2:20
4.	"El-Shaddai"	Michael Card, John Thompson	4:40
5.	"We Shall Behold Him"	Dottie Rambo	4:43
6.	"Because He Lives"	Bill Gaither, Gloria Gaither	4:26
7.	"Through It All"	Andraé Crouch	3:46
8.	"The King Is Coming"	B. Gaither, G. Gaither, Chuck Millhuff	3:43
9.	"Praise the Lord, He Never Changes"	Stormie Omartian, Ron Harris	3:59
10.	"Rise Again"	Dallas Holm	3:59

== Personnel ==
The Imperials

- Paul Smith – lead, vocals
- Jim Murray – tenor, vocals
- David Will – baritone, vocals
- Armond Morales – bass, vocals

Musicians

- Mitch Humphries – keyboards
- David Huntsinger – keyboards
- Alan Moore – keyboards
- John Darnall – guitars
- Greg Jennings – guitars
- Craig Nelson – bass
- Mark Hammond – drums
- Dennis Holt – drums
- Farrell Morris – percussion
- Cindy Reynolds – harp
- Don Hart – arrangements and conductor
- Kathy Hart – music copyist

Brass and Woodwinds

- Ann Richards, Denis Solee, Bobby Taylor and Roger Wisemeyer – woodwinds
- Robert Heuer and Tom McAninch – French horn
- Ernie Collins and Dennis Good – trombone
- Jay Coble and John Harbaugh – trumpet

The Kristin Wilkinson Strings

- John Catchings, Mark Feldman, William Fitzpatrick, Jim Grosjean, Victoria Haltom, Gary Lawrence, Ted Madsen, Bob Mason, Phyllis Mazza, Conni McCollister, Laura Molyneaux, Samuel Terranova and Kristin Wilkinson – string players

=== Production ===
- Neal Joseph – producer
- Scott Hendricks – orchestra engineer, mixdown engineer
- Jim Baird – vocal engineer
- Phil Dihel – assistant engineer
- Sallie Gross – assistant engineer
- Danny Mundhenk – assistant engineer
- Hank Williams – mastering at MasterMix (Nashville, Tennessee)
- Jim Osborn – design, illustration

== Charts ==
Chart (1984)	Peak position
US Top Inspirational Albums (Billboard)	8
