= Jonathan Pierce =

American singer and interior designer (1967–2020)

- Born: Jonathan Pierce Hildreth; November 15, 1967; Texas, U.S.
- Died: May 9, 2020 (aged 52)
- Genres: Contemporary Christian, gospel
- Occupations: Singer, interior designer, television host
- Instrument: Vocals
- Years active: 1990–2004
- Label: Curb

Jonathan Pierce Hildreth, known professionally as Jonathan Pierce (November 15, 1967 – May 9, 2020), was an American CCM, gospel singer from Odessa, Texas and an interior designer in Nashville. Pierce used his first and middle name while omitting his last name for career purposes.

== Career ==
=== Music ===
Pierce began singing in church at age seven and took voice lessons from age nine. Following his graduation from high school, he relocated to Nashville, Tennessee, where he sang with the Christ Church Choir. Naomi Judd introduced him with The Imperials, who offered him a spot. He was with them for three years (1990–93), until he was offered a position with the Gaither Vocal Band. He remained with them for three years (1994–97).

Pierce released several albums on Curb Records. In 1999, he was nominated for five Gospel Music Association's Dove Awards for Song of the Year and Pop/Contemporary Song of the Year for "I Believe In Christ", Inspirational Song of the Year for "Farther Than Your Grace Can Reach", and Male Vocalist of the Year. His 2000 release, Sanctuary, hit No. 35 on the Billboard Top Contemporary Christian Albums chart.

Pierce appeared in the part of Joseph in the Nashville revival of Joseph and the Amazing Technicolor Dreamcoat in December 1999.

=== Interior design ===
Pierce left music to pursue a career as an interior designer in which he became the lead designer for CMT's Ultimate Country Home series in 2003. Pierce was the proprietor of Pierce and Company in Nashville. He subsequently appeared on the VH1 reality show LeAnn & Eddie in 2014.

== Personal life ==
Pierce married his wife Denise in 1994 and they divorced in 2007. His ex-wife is an acclaimed author who explains that their marriage was tumultuous, yet refuses to be public about the cause of the divorce. She outlined the marriage struggles in her book, "Flying Solo."

== Death ==
Pierce died on May 9, 2020, while recovering from heart surgery. He was 52 years old.

== Discography ==
=== With the Imperials ===
- Big God (1991)
- Stir It Up (1992)

=== With the Gaither Vocal Band ===
- Testify (1994)
- Southern Classics: Volume II (1995)
- Back Home in Indiana [live] (1997)
- Lovin' God & Lovin' Each Other (1997)

=== Solo ===
- One Love (1995)
- Mission (1998)
- Sanctuary (2000)
- For You (2003)

=== Appearances on other albums ===
- Christmas Is Coming Home B.J. Thomas (1997)
- Moments Vestal Goodman (1997)

=== Gaither Homecoming video solo performances ===
- Sing Your Blues Away; "Because He Lives" (1996)
- Homecoming Texas Style; "O What A Savior", "I Bowed On My Knees and Cried Holy" (1996)
- Joy To The World; "New Star Shining" (1996)
- Back Home In Indiana; "I Believe In A Hill Called Mount Calvary" (1997)
