= The Imperials =

American contemporary Christian music group

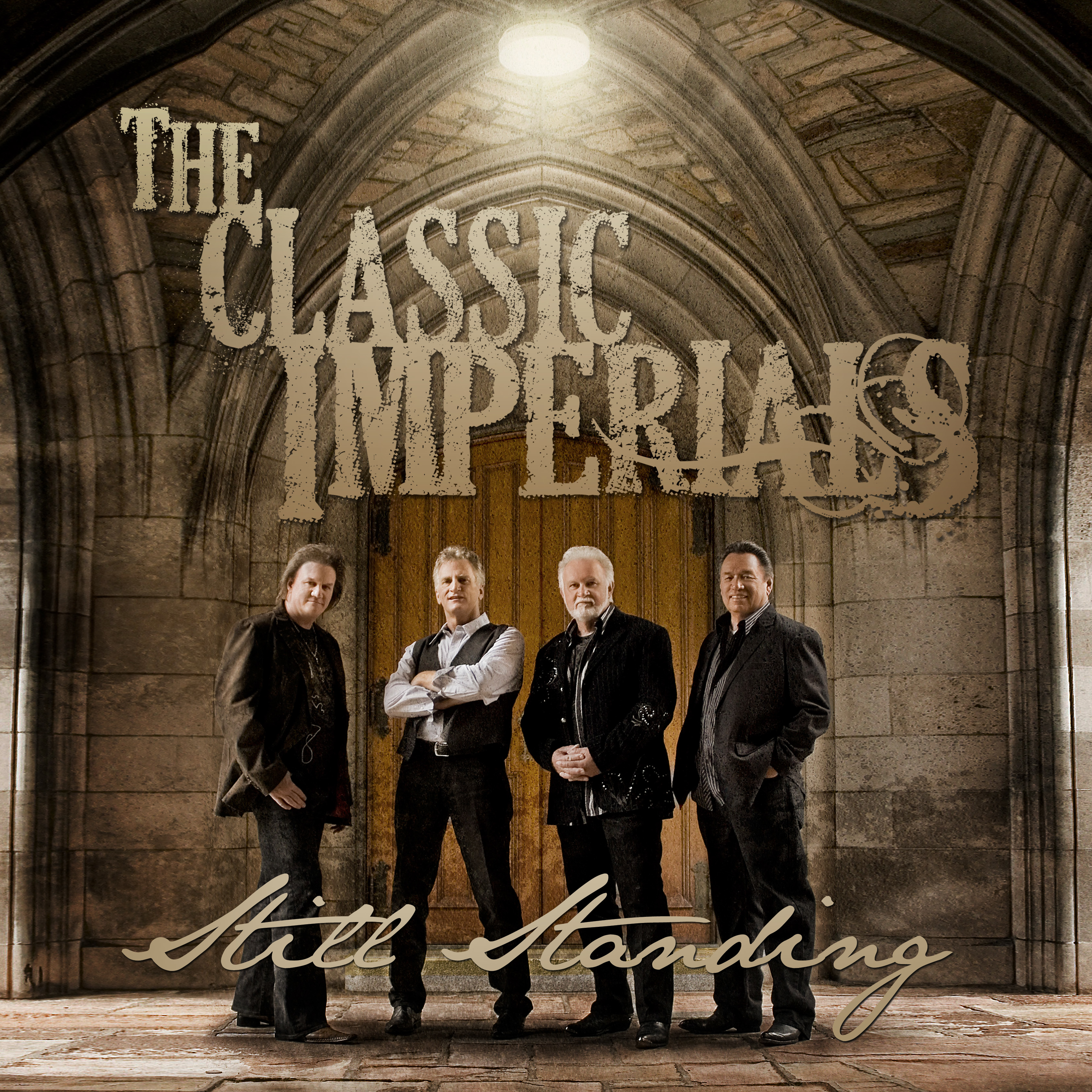
- Left to right: Evans, Smith, Will, and Morales

Background information
- Also known as: Jake Hess and the Imperials, The Classic Imperials
- Origin: Atlanta, Georgia, U.S.
- Genres: Contemporary Christian; gospel; Southern gospel
- Years active: 1964–2010 (main group), 2006–present (Classic Imperials)
- Labels: Heart Warming; Impact; Dayspring; Myrrh; Lamon; StarSong
- Website: theclassicimperials.com

The Imperials are an American contemporary Christian music group. Originating as a southern gospel quartet, the innovative group would become a staple of contemporary Christian music beginning in the 1970s. The group has won four Grammys, fifteen Dove Awards, and was inducted into the Gospel Music Hall of Fame.

== Group history ==
=== Jake Hess and the Imperials ===
The band had its genesis when long-time Statesmen Quartet member Jake Hess retired from that group on December 7, 1963. Hess wanted to start a new group recognized as "king" of the Southern gospel field and thought the "Imperials" would be a good moniker. After getting the go-ahead from Marion Snider for permission to use the name (Snider had previously operated an Imperial Quartet named after its sponsor Imperial Sugar), he gathered together pianist Henry Slaughter from the Weatherford Quartet, ex-Oak Ridge Boys baritone Gary McSpadden, the Weatherford Quartet's bass singer Armond Morales and Speer Family tenor Sherrill (Shaun) Neilsen to join him. After signing with Benson Records in 1964, the group recorded their first of many albums on the Heart Warming Records label. The following year, the quartet organization moved from Atlanta to Nashville, Tennessee. After two years with the group, tenor Nielsen was first to go and Jim Murray would replace him. Murray's past included stints with The Melodares, the Stamps Trio, Inspirationals, and Orrell Quartet. About this time, Slaughter also departed with Joe Moscheo of the Harmoneers replacing him at the keyboard.

=== 1960s thru early 1970s ===
In late 1966, Henry Slaughter left the group and Hess assembled a new band to accompany the quartet. With Joe Moscheo on piano, Larry Benson on drums, keyboard, bass, and miscellaneous other instruments, along with Dave Mathis on electric guitar, a new sound was formed. Ron Hamm replaced Mathis on guitar within a few months. In 1967, Hess began having heart issues, and by the end of the year, under doctor's orders, he left the road, turning the reins of the group over to Morales, Moscheo, and Murray. McSpadden chose to leave around this time in 1967 also. With new members Roger Wiles (from family group the Melodaires) and former Stamps Quartet member, Terry Blackwood, the group became known as simply The Imperials and introduced a more contemporary sound on the 1967 album New Dimensions. The album led them to be awarded "Male Quartet of the Year" in 1969 from the Gospel Music Association.

The group recorded with Elvis Presley from May 1966 to June 1971. This included his last two Grammy Award-producing albums: How Great Thou Art (which won a Grammy for the title song and featured a duet with Hess on the classic Statesmen song "If the Lord Wasn't Walking by My Side") and He Touched Me (which used many of the songs that The Imperials had recorded on their own albums and, again, won a Grammy for the title song). In 1969, Presley hired the group to perform in concert with him after the Jordanaires had turned down Presley's invitation to play Las Vegas and tour; the group felt they could afford to be away from Nashville as long as a touring commitment required. In the same time frame, The Imperials appeared with Jimmy Dean live as well as on his television show. Larry Gatlin auditioned for the group in the fall of 1970, then got the call to sing with them in early 1971 backing Jimmy Dean in Las Vegas. Gatlin with the group for less than one month after he and his wife moved to Nashville to begin a career in country music. Gatlin's position in the group was filled by Greg Gordon. In November 1971, because of scheduling conflicts, The Imperials decided to stop performing with Presley; in 1972, they stopped performing with Jimmy Dean.

=== Southern Gospel to CCM ===
The Imperials surprised gospel music fans in February 1972 by hiring Sherman Andrus, a former member of Andrae Crouch and the Disciples to replace Greg Gordon. This change made them the first interracial Christian group in the United States. The lineup of the group stayed stable with Andrus and Terry Blackwood sharing lead vocals through 1976 when Joe Moscheo left just after the recording of Follow the Man with the Music. The following year, the pair themselves left to form contemporary Christian music act Andrus, Blackwood & Company. In early 1976, the group hired baritone David Will, former lead for the Keystone Quartet and the Statesmen. Will stayed with the group for 23 years. Also added at this time was Russ Taff as lead vocalist. The Taff-led outfit is heard on the albums Sail On, Imperials Live, Heed the Call, One More Song for You, Christmas with The Imperials, and Priority. It was during this era that the group officially moved from Southern Gospel to Contemporary Christian Music, experiencing their biggest success with both awards and on the charts.

=== 1980s ===
After five years with the group, Taff left in 1981 for a solo career. Paul Smith, who while promoting an Imperials concert at Baylor University where he was a student, gave Morales a tape of his music. When Morales knew Taff was leaving, he called Smith, who is first heard on 1982's Stand by the Power. During Smith's time with the group came another first, a 2-disc album with each member taking a solo side (Side by Side), which earned them their last Dove Award. The group made a return to four-part harmony singing on The Imperials Sing the Classics before returning to their Christian pop sound on 1985's Let the Wind Blow.

The group saw its biggest turnover since Blackwood and Andrus' departure when both Smith and long-time tenor Jim Murray left the group. Smith opted for a solo CCM career while Murray sought to perform more traditionally styled gospel music again. Danny Ward replaced Smith, but he left before recording an album with the band. After that, Jimmie Lee Sloas and Ron Hemby were the newest replacement members.

The Imperials stirred up controversy and lost some of their long-time fans when they exchanged their soft-pop sound for a rock sound with electric guitars featured prominently on the 1987 album This Year's Model. The song "Power of God" became a theme song for Christian bodybuilders The Power Team and new younger fans began to come to Imperials concerts. The album Free the Fire reverted a bit towards the soft pop sound and after its recording, Sloas became the next Imperial to seek a solo career. David Robertson replaced him but following 1990's Love's Still Changing Hearts, he opted to go solo with Jason Beddoe and Jonathan Hildreth joining the group.

=== 1990s ===
In 1991, the Imperials would surprise fans again by bringing in Armond's sister Pam Morales to the lineup. Although she appeared with the group in the early 1980s as a backup singer, this would be the first time a female was a front member of the quartet. Armond Morales decided to bring her in when Beddoe left the group while in the midst of recording for Big God. She remained in the lineup through 1993's Stir It Up.

1993 saw the group change and go in a different direction. What once was strictly a set contract agreement to most performances, the Imperials began to re-establish themselves by scaling down their act, opting for simple accompaniment and more intimate church performances in place of stadium and large concerts—ministering in local churches for free-will offerings only. The Imperials that year performed in over 200 churches, more dates than the previous two years, this they achieved with Brian Comeaux singing lead and a succession of tenors, including Mark Addock, Peter Pankratz and Bill Morris, singing at selected dates. No albums were recorded during this time.

In 1994, they returned with new members Steven Ferguson and Jeff Walker, both of whom were ordained ministers—as were Armond and Will by this time. They signed a one-project deal with the familiar Impact Records, which had been re-acquired by Homeland Records and Landmark Distribution. After a three-year recording hiatus, the release of Til He Comes marked the change back to a four-part harmony sound—losing the hard edge of previous albums and helping restore their original fans to the fold.

== Legacy ==
In 1998, The Imperials were inducted into the Gospel Music Association's Gospel Music Hall of Fame. All five original members, Hess, Morales, McSpadden, Sherrill, and Slaughter; as well as Blackwood, Andrus, Moscheo, Murray, and Taff were there to accept the induction.

In 2003, the five members of the Imperials that toured with Presley (Murray, Blackwood, Wiles, Morales, and Moscheo) reunited for a 25th Anniversary, Elvis Lives concert and DVD recording, in Memphis, Tennessee.

In September 2003, Armond Morales finally retired from The Imperials and transferred ownership to his son, Jason Morales. By this time, the lineup was Jason Morales, Jeremie Hudson, new bass Ian Owens, and Shannon Smith. This version of the group released two albums on Lamon Records, The Imperials (2006) and Back to the Roots (2007), which is a collection of new versions of classic Imperials songs, and brought the group's first top 20 song in more than 15 years. The Hudson-Smith-Morales-Owens lineup of the group also performed at Carnegie Hall (the first time the Imperials ever appeared at that venue).

In 2008, the Imperials were inducted into the Christian Music Hall of Fame. Taff was inducted for his contributions separately but performed with the Imperials and made the acceptance with them for the broadcast. In April 2008, The Imperials received the Southern Gospel News Awards' Album of the Year award for Back to the Roots. In early 2010, the main Imperials group, consisting of Jason Morales, Ian Owens, Scott Allen, and Perry Jones, disbanded. Owens then went on to spend a year serving with Ernie Haase & Signature Sound.

In 2010, Armond Morales came out of retirement and returned to the group along with Imperials alumni Smith and Will. They joined Robbie Hiner and Rick Evans, the group's GM and lead singer. Morales, the only still-performing original member, along with the rest of the reunited foursome, released the group's final album, Still Standing that same year.

=== Accomplishments ===
- First Dove Award winner for male group of the year (1969)
- First gospel group to perform live on The Grammy Awards.
- First Dove Award winner for Artist of the Year (1981)
- First group to have a No. 1 song ("Oh Buddha") on all three of the following charts: Contemporary, Inspirational, Southern Gospel
- First Christian group to use four individual microphones on stage
- First Christian group to use cordless microphones
- First Christian group to use a live band on stage
- Recorded the theme song for the Daniel Boone television series (third version)
- Only Christian group to have a No. 1 song charting in four consecutive decades (1960s–1990s)

== Members ==
The Imperials
1964–1965 (Jake Hess and the Imperials)	Sherrill Neilsen – tenor; Jake Hess – lead; Gary McSpadden – baritone; Armond Morales – bass; Henry Slaughter – piano	Jake Hess & the Imperials (1964); Introducing the Illustrious Imperials (1964); Fireside Hymns (1964); Blends & Rhythms (1964); Talent Times Five (1965); Slaughter Writes – Imperials Sing (1965); The Happy Sounds of Jake Hess & the Imperials (1965); He Was a Preachin' Man (1965); Slightly Regal (1965); Live From Charlotte, NC-1964 (2008) (CD release only)
1966	Hess; McSpadden; Morales; Slaughter; Jim Murray – tenor	The Imperials Sing Their Favorite Hymns (1966); The Imperials Sing Inspirational Classics (1966)
1966–1967	Hess; McSpadden; Morales; Murray; Joe Moscheo – piano, featured vocals	To Sing is the Thing (1967)
1967–1970 (Now simply "The Imperials")	Morales; Moscheo; Murray; Terry Blackwood – lead; Roger Wiles – baritone	New Dimensions (1968); Now (1968); Love is the Thing (1969); Gospel's Alive & Well (1969)
1971	Blackwood; Morales; Moscheo; Murray; Larry Gatlin – baritone, lead	
1971–1972	Blackwood – baritone, lead; Morales; Moscheo; Murray; Greg Gordon – Baritone	Time to Get it Together (1971)
1972–1975	Blackwood; Morales; Moscheo; Murray; Sherman Andrus – baritone, lead	Imperials (1972); Live (1973); Follow the Man with the Music (1974)
1975–1976	Andrus; Blackwood; Morales; Murray	No Shortage (1975); Just Because (1976)
1976	Andrus; Morales; Murray; David Will – baritone, lead	
1976–1981	Morales; Murray; Russ Taff – lead; David Will – baritone	Sail On (1977); Imperials Live (1978); Heed the Call (1979); One More Song for You (1979); Christmas with the Imperials (1980); Priority (1980); The Lost Album (2006) (recorded 1976)
1981–1985	Morales; Murray; Will; Paul Smith – lead	Stand by the Power (1982); Side By Side (1983); 20th Anniversary (video) (1984); The Imperials Sing the Classics (1984); Let the Wind Blow (1985)
1985–1986	Morales; Murray; Will; Danny Ward – lead	
1986	Morales; Ward; Will; Ron Hemby – tenor, lead	
1986–1989	Hemby; Morales; Will; Jimmie Lee Sloas – Tenor	This Year's Model (1987); Free the Fire (1988)
1989–1990	Hemby; Morales; Will; David Robertson – lead, tenor	Love's Still Changing Hearts (1990)
1990	Morales; Will; Jason Beddoe – tenor, lead; Jonathan (Pierce) Hildreth – lead, tenor	
1990–1993	Hildreth; Armond Morales; Will; Pam Morales – alto, lead	Big God (1991); Stir It Up (1992)
1993	Morales; Will; Mark Addock – tenor; Brian Comeaux – lead	
1993	Comeaux; Morales; Will; Peter Pankratz – tenor	
1993	Comeaux; Morales; Will; Bill Morris – tenor	
1994–1996	Morales; Will; Steven Ferguson – tenor; Jeff Walker – lead	Til He Comes (1995)
1996–1998	Ferguson; Morales; Will; Steve Shapiro – lead	It's Still the Cross (1996)
1998–1999	Ferguson; Morales; Will; Barry Weeks – lead	Songs of Christmas (1998)
1999	Morales; Weeks; Will; Jeremie Hudson – tenor	
1999–2001	Hudson; Armond Morales; Jason Hallcox – lead; Jason Morales – baritone	
2001–2002	Hudson; J. Morales; A. Morales; Richie Crook – lead	I Was Made for This (2002)
2002–2003	Hudson; J. Morales; A. Morales; Shannon Smith – lead	
2003–2008	Hudson; Smith; J. Morales; Ian Owens – bass	The Imperials (2006); Back to the Roots (2007)
2008–2010	J. Morales; Owens; Scott Allen – lead; Perry Jones – tenor	

The Classic Imperials
2006–2010	Robbie Hiner – tenor; Rick Evans – lead; Dave Will – baritone; Armond Morales – bass	Standing Strong (2008; reissued with a new label and as a digital download-exclusive in 2018); The Ones (2008 – #1 hits newly recorded; the album was not able to be released to the public)
2010–2017	Paul Smith – tenor, lead; Rick Evans; Dave Will; Armond Morales	Still Standing (2010); Still Standing (video) (2010)
2018	Robbie Hiner; Rick Evans; Lonnie Ott – baritone; Armond Morales	
2019–2021	Paul Smith; Rick Evans; Lonnie Ott; Michael Schlee – bass	
2021–2022	Paul Smith; Rick Evans; Ron Hemby – lead/baritone; Lonnie Ott – baritone(/bass?)	
2022–present	Paul Smith; Rick Evans; Ron Hemby; Rod Fletcher – bass	Blessed (EP and DVD) (2024)

=== In memoriam ===
- Jake Hess: December 24, 1927 – January 4, 2004
- Pam Morales-Dietz: (d) August 27, 2005
- Sherrill "Shaun" Nielsen: September 10, 1942 – December 10, 2010
- Joe Moscheo: August 11, 1937 – January 11, 2016
- Gary McSpadden: January 26, 1943 – April 15, 2020
- Jonathan Pierce Hildreth: October 15, 1967 – May 9, 2020
- Henry Slaughter: January 9, 1927 – November 13, 2020
- David Will: October 22, 1943 – March 4, 2022
- Armond Morales: February 25, 1932 – December 5, 2022
- Greg Gordon: November 20, 1950 – April 28, 2026

== Accolades ==
Grammy Awards
Year	Category	Nominated work	Result
1972	Best Gospel Performance (Other Than Soul Gospel)	Time to Get It Together	Nominated
1974	Best Gospel Performance (Other Than Soul Gospel)	Live	Nominated
1975	Best Gospel Performance (Other Than Soul Gospel)	No Shortage	Won
1977	Best Gospel Performance (Other Than Soul Gospel)	Just Because	Nominated
1978	Best Gospel Performance, Contemporary or Inspirational	Sail On	Won
1979	Best Gospel Performance, Contemporary or Inspirational	Imperials Live	Nominated
1980	Best Gospel Performance, Contemporary or Inspirational	Heed the Call	Won
1981	Best Gospel Performance, Contemporary or Inspirational	Priority	Won

Year	GMA Dove Awards
1969	Male Group of the Year
1975	Male Group of the Year
1976
1976	Pop/Contemporary Album of the Year: No Shortage
1978	Male Group of the Year
1980	Male Group of the Year
1981	Artist of the Year
1981	Group of the Year
1981	Pop/Contemporary Album of the Year: One More Song for You
1982	Male Group of the Year
1982	Pop/Contemporary Album of the Year: Priority
1983	Group of the Year
1984	Pop/Contemporary Album of the Year: Side By Side
