= Stir It Up (album) =

Studio album by The Imperials
- Released: 1992
- Studio: RTC Studio, Franklin, Tennessee; Classic Studio and Quad Studios, Nashville, Tennessee
- Genre: CCM; Christian pop; R&B
- Length: 39:41
- Label: Star Song
- Producer: Paul Mills

The Imperials chronology
Big God (1991)	Stir It Up (1992)	Treasures (1994)

Professional ratings
Review scores
Source	Rating
Cross Rhythms	7/10 stars

Stir It Up is a 1992 studio album by Christian music vocal group The Imperials. It is the group's third album on Star Song Records.

The personnel line-up for this album consists of Armond Morales, David Will, Jonathan Pierce (still under his birth name Jonathan Hildreth) and Pam Morales. In 1993, Pam Morales would retire from the group after the release of Stir It Up and Pierce also left the group and a year later was offered a spot on Bill Gaither's southern gospel quartet the Gaither Vocal Band and a couple of years later started his solo recording career in contemporary Christian music. This would be the final full album of the Imperials' commercial contemporary pop sound of previous albums as the group would undergo another lineup change and a return to their four-part harmony of their early years. The album's first radio single "Taking Your Love for Granted" would give the group their final number one song on the Christian radio charts. The Imperials have had number one songs in three decades from the 1970s, 1980s and 1990s. Stir It Up climbed up to number 20 on the Billboard Top Christian Albums chart.

== Track listing ==
No.	Title	Writer(s)	Length
1.	"Change the World"	Terry Esau	4:28
2.	"Taking Your Love for Granted"	David Raynor, Kenny Lamar, Michael Peterson	3:48
3.	"We're All Looking"	Dwight Liles, Judy Reno	3:50
4.	"Testify"	Julius Drummin, Ty Lacy	4:06
5.	"Put the Weight on My Shoulders"	Gino Vannelli	4:37
6.	"Standing on the Rock of Love"	J. Drummin, T. Lacy	3:43
7.	"Stir It Up"	J. Drummin, Keith Brown	4:17
8.	"I Believe in You"	D. Raynor, K. Lamar	4:02
9.	"My Faith Stands"	Shawn Craig	4:01
10.	"Change the World" (Reprise)	T. Esau	3:47

== Personnel ==
The Imperials

- Jonathan Pierce – tenor, co-lead vocals
- Pam Morales – alto, co-lead vocals
- David Will – baritone, vocals
- Armond Morales – bass, vocals

Musicians

- Brian Green – keyboards, bass programming
- Paul Mills – additional keyboards, additional programming; keyboards, bass, drums and percussion programming (4)
- Tony Miracle – keyboard programming (9)
- Jerry McPherson – guitars
- Mark Hammond – drums and percussion programming, bass programming (2, 9), additional drums and percussion programming (4)
- Mark Douthit – saxophones (2, 4, 6, 8)
- Lisa Bevill – additional backing vocals
- Chris Harris – additional backing vocals, BGV and group vocal arrangements
- Chris Rodriguez – additional backing vocals
- Guy Penrod – additional backing vocals (9)
- Angelo Petrucci – additional backing vocals (9)
- Veronica Petrucci – additional backing vocals (9)
- Shirley M. Settles – additional backing vocals (9)
- Ken "Scat" Springs – additional backing vocals (9)

Production

- Armond Morales – executive producer
- Jeff Moseley – executive producer
- Paul Mills – producer, recording, mixing
- Ricky Cobble – assistant engineer
- Hank Williams – mastering at MasterMix (Nashville, Tennessee)
- Scott Brickell and Chad Williams – production management at Chapel Hill Management
- Toni Thigpen – art direction
- Tufts Design Studio – design, layout
- Jeff Frasier – photography

== Critical reception ==
Tony Cummings of Cross Rhythms gave Stir It Up 7 out of 10 saying that producer Paul Mills "gives the group some nice funky synth-pop arrangements full of 1992 appeal though I'd love to know what the youth thinks of a group manned in part by grizzled wrinkles targeting music splat them. My favorites on this set are 'Taking Your Love For Granted,' an infectious midtempo throbber, and the somewhat slower and funkier 'We're All Looking.' American audiences can seemingly turn out quality pop gospel like this at will, and I can imagine quite a few Christian jocks giving this a radio airing."

== Charts ==
Chart (1991)	Peak position
US Top Christian Albums (Billboard)	20

=== Radio singles ===
Year	Singles	Peak positions	
Year	Singles	CCM AC	CCM CHR
1993	"Taking Your Love for Granted"	1	3
1993	"We're All Looking"	2	—
1993	"Change the World"	—	14
1993	"Standing on the Rock of Love"	14	9
1993-94	"Stir It Up"	—	4
