= 8th GMA Dove Awards =

1976 US music awards ceremony

- Date: 1976
- Location: Nashville, Tennessee

The 8th Annual GMA Dove Awards were held on 1976 recognizing accomplishments of musicians for the year 1975. The show was held in Nashville, Tennessee.
