= Stand by the Power =

Studio album by The Imperials
- Released: 1982
- Studio: Bill Schnee Studio, Los Angeles, California; Bullet Recording Studio, Nashville, Tennessee
- Genre: Contemporary Christian music; Christian pop; inspirational
- Length: 38:04
- Label: DaySpring/Word Records
- Producer: Bill Schnee

The Imperials chronology
The Very Best of the Imperials (1981)	Stand by the Power (1982)	Side by Side (1983)

Professional ratings
Review scores
Source	Rating
AllMusic	2/5 stars

Stand by the Power is the 28th studio album by Christian music vocal group The Imperials, released in 1982 on DaySpring Records. This is the first album to feature new lead singer Paul Smith, who replaced Russ Taff after being with the group since 1976. While promoting an Imperials concert at Baylor University where he was a student, Smith gave Armond Morales a tape of his music. When Morales learned that Taff was leaving, he called Smith. Smith co-wrote five songs on this album and the Imperials also covered the Kerry Livgren track "How Can You Live" from his album Seeds of Change (1980). In 1983, the Imperials won the Dove Award for Group of the Year at the 14th GMA Dove Awards. The album peaked at number two on the Billboard Top Inspirational Albums chart.

== Track listing ==
No.	Title	Writer(s)	Length
1.	"Stand by the Power"	Paul Smith, John Rosasco	3:33
2.	"Somebody New"	P. Smith, Frank Previte, Blake Levinsohn	3:52
3.	"Part Time Servant"	Keith Thomas, Claire Cloninger	3:44
4.	"This Heart"	K. Thomas	4:26
5.	"Lord of the Harvest"	P. Smith, James Newton Howard	4:37
6.	"Under His Reign"	Bruce Hibbard	3:26
7.	"I Never Get Enough of Your Love"	P. Smith, J. Rosasco	4:07
8.	"How Can You Live"	Kerry Livgren	3:46
9.	"All for the Asking"	P. Smith, J. Newton Howard	3:49
10.	"Because of Who You Are"	Billy Smiley, Bob Farrell	3:31

== Personnel ==
The Imperials

- Paul Smith – lead vocals
- Jim Murray – tenor, vocals
- David Will – baritone, vocals
- Armond Morales – bass, vocals

Musicians

- James Newton Howard – pianos, synthesizers, string arrangements
- Hadley Hockensmith – guitars
- Dann Huff – guitars
- Steve Lukather – guitars
- Carlos Rios – guitars
- Nathan East – bass
- Neil Stubenhaus – bass
- Jeff Porcaro – drums
- Carlos Vega – drums
- Lenny Castro – percussion
- Bob Wilson – horn arrangements (9)

Production

- Bill Schnee – producer, engineer
- David Schober – assistant engineer
- Scott Hendricks – assistant vocal engineer
- Skip Moon – assistant vocal engineer
- Susan Pyron – production coordinator
- Michael Borum – front cover photography
- Allan Messer – back cover photography

== Charts ==
Chart (1983)	Peak position
US Top Inspirational Albums (Billboard)	2

=== Radio singles ===
Year	Singles	Peak positions
Year	Singles	CCM AC
1982	"Lord of the Harvest"	3
1983	"Somebody New"	9
1983	"Because of Who You Are"	37

== Accolades ==
GMA Dove Awards

- 1983 Group of the Year
