= Big God (album) =

Studio album by The Imperials
- Released: 1991
- Studio: Digital Recorders, Nashville, Tennessee; Classic Recorders, Franklin, Tennessee; Hummingbird Recording, Nashville, Tennessee
- Genre: CCM; Christian pop; gospel; inspirational
- Length: 48:44
- Label: Star Song
- Producer: Ken Mansfield

The Imperials chronology
Love's Still Changing Hearts (1990)	Big God (1991)	Stir It Up (1992)

Professional ratings
Review scores
Source	Rating
AllMusic	3/5 stars
Cross Rhythms	8/10 stars

Big God is a 1991 studio album by Christian music vocal group The Imperials and is their second album released on the Star Song label. The personnel line-up for this album consists of Armond Morales, David Will and two new singers Jonathan Pierce (who was credited on the album by his birth name Jonathan Hildreth. Pierce is his middle name.) and, in an Imperials first, Armond's sister Pam Morales. Morales would be the first and only female member of the group. Morales and Pierce replaced Ron Hemby and David Robertson whom both previously appeared on the 1990 album Love's Still Changing Hearts. Jason Beddoe was with the group temporarily but he left the group while in the midst of recording Big God so Armond brought Pam to fill in for Beddoe. This line-up would stay on until their next album Stir It Up (1992). Big God peaked at number 22 on the Billboard Top Christian Albums chart.

== Track listing ==
No.	Title	Writer(s)	Length
1.	"Big God"	John Olson, Terry Esau	6:12
2.	"Take Me There"	Bill Cantos, Julius Drummin, Ty Lacy	4:30
3.	"Nothing Less"	Gary Driskell, Leonard Ahlstrom	5:26
4.	"What Can I Do with This Love (Woman at the Well)"	Jerome Olds	4:48
5.	"Rescue Me"	Richey Biggs, Dennis Patton	5:20
6.	"Streams in the Desert"	David Martin, Billy Smiley	4:11
7.	"Closer Than a Brother"	Todd Cooper, Bo Cooper	4:42
8.	"All the Paths"	Dino Pastin, Janna Pastin, Jeff Slaughter	5:03
9.	"Carry Your Heart to Me"	Regie Hamm, Joel Lindsey	3:59
10.	"Stand on the Rock"	Rick Vito	4:33

== Personnel ==
The Imperials

- Jonathan Pierce - tenor (lead vocals on tracks 1, 2, 5, 7, 9, 10)
- Pam Morales – alto (lead vocals on tracks 1, 4, 8–10)
- David Will – baritone (lead vocals on tracks 3 & 6)
- Armond Morales – bass (lead vocals on track 1)

Musicians

- Bob Patin – keyboards, arrangements
- Blair Masters – special effects programming
- Brent Rowan – guitars
- David Hungate – bass
- Mark Hammond – drums
- Eric Darken – percussion
- Kristin Wilkinson – string arrangements and conductor
- John Catchings and Bob Mason – cello
- Jim Grosjean and Gary Vanosdale – viola
- David Angell, Conni Ellisor, Carl Gorodetzky, Lee Larrison, Ted Madsen, Laura Molynlaux and Pamela Sixfin – violin
- Leah Jane Berinati – vocal arrangements (1, 2, 4–9)
- Mark Pagen – vocal arrangements (3, 10)

Production

- Armond Morales – executive producer
- Ken Mansfield – producer, arrangements
- Bryan Lenox – first engineer
- John Kuniz – second engineer
- Brent King – overdub engineer
- Milan Bogdan – editing and sequencing at Masterfonics (Nashville, Tennessee)
- Stephen Marcussen – mastering at Precision Mastering (Hollywood, California)
- Toni Thigpen – creative direction
- Gina Binkley – design, photo illustration
- Mark Tucker – photography, photo illustration
- Michael Tyler – make-up

== Critical reception ==
Phil Thomson of Cross Rhythms gave Big God 8 out of 10 saying "the choice of songs, the gutsy production, soaring quasi-black vocal leads against disciplined harmony, insistent percussion and a real sense of purpose - just enough drama to imbue the set with urgency, you have to rise above the penchant for oh-so-sincere build-up on one or two tracks, treatments which, in any other context might slip into parody. To their credit, they have been economical with the strings. There's significance in the label - Star Song Communications - where so many other acts dish up elevator music, this quartet really does communicate."

== Charts ==
Chart (1991)	Peak position
US Top Christian Albums (Billboard)	22

=== Radio singles ===
Year	Singles	Peak positions
Year	Singles	CCM AC
1991	"Nothing Less"	13
1992	"Carry Your Heart to Me"	8
1992	"Take Me There"	17
