= 9th GMA Dove Awards =

1977 US music awards ceremony

- Date: 1977
- Location: Nashville, Tennessee

The 9th Annual GMA Dove Awards were held on 1977 recognizing accomplishments of musicians for the year 1976. The show was held in Nashville, Tennessee.
