= Sherman Andrus =

American gospel singer

Sherman Andrus, Sr.
- Born: June 23, 1942 (age 84)
- Genres: Gospel; contemporary Christian
- Occupation: Singer
- Years active: 1964–present
- Member of: The Imperials
- Formerly of: Andrus, Blackwood and Company
- Website: shermanandrus.com

Sherman Andrus (born June 23, 1942) is an American gospel singer who was the lead singer of the Christian music group The Imperials.

== Biography ==
Andrus sang with his mother's gospel group in his hometown of Mermentau, Louisiana. Next he was in a band called COGICs named after the denomination of the church which the band's founder, Andraé Crouch, attended (Church of God in Christ).

Andrus continued his association with Crouch as Crouch formed the contemporary Christian music act Andraé Crouch and the Disciples in 1964. He toured with the group through 1970. Andrus joined The Imperials in February 1972, replacing the departing Greg Gordon. Andrus sang as baritone and co-lead singer along with Terry Blackwood. He joined with Blackwood to form a contemporary duo Andrus, Blackwood and Company which released six albums from 1977 to 1984. Andrus began a solo career in 1986. In 1997, he joined Elvis: The Concert, sponsored by Elvis Presley Enterprises, to commemorate the 20th anniversary of Elvis Presley's death.

On April 2, 1998, Andrus was inducted into the Gospel Music Hall of Fame twice, as a member of The Imperials and as a founding member of Andraé Crouch and the Disciples. He studied music at Southern University in Baton Rouge, Louisiana, then he and his wife, Winnie, lived in the greater Oklahoma City area with his wife Winnie, and since has moved to northwestern Washington.

In April 2002, Andrus and his friend, Lonny Bingle, formed Andrus and Bingle. Their fourth album was to be released in 2017.

== Selected discography ==
Sources:

- 1973: I've Got Confidence (Impact Records)
- 1976: Soon Coming (Shalom Records)
- 1978: How The Years Pass By (Shalom)
- 1982: Revisited (Christian World)
- 1988: Caution To the Wind (Amethyst Records)
- 1993: Seize The Moment (Exodus Records)
- 1994: Live: Hit Me Band (Exodus)
- 2003: Merry Christmas From Sherman Andrus
- 2002: Think Upon These Things – Andrus and Bingle
- 2013: A Servant's Heart – Andrus and Bingle
- 2017: LIVE – Andrus and Bingle

== Video ==
- 1987: Toymaker's Dream (soundtrack)
- 1999: He Touched Me – The Gospel Music of Elvis Presley
- 2002: New Orleans Homecoming; solo on "Precious Lord, Take My Hand"
- 2002: Let Freedom Ring "A Few Good Men"
- 2006: Elvis Lives: The 25th Anniversary Concert (recorded 2002)
