= Power Team =

Group of Christian Evangelists

Logo

The Power Team is a group of Christian evangelists, based in Dallas, Texas. They incorporate their preaching with displays of strength and martial arts skills. They were founded in the late 1970s by John Jacobs. Their performances, usually taped at large megachurches, were broadcast on TBN (and other Christian television stations in the United States) in the late 1980s.

== History ==
The Power Team often conducts performances in churches and venues, such as schools, to encourage audiences from outside church communities. When performing in public schools, they are not permitted to discuss religion, instead promoting social responsibility and abstention from drugs and alcohol. The group's promotional material indicated that it presented a "message that strengthens and restores the family".

In May 2000, original Power Team leader John Jacobs divorced his wife Ruthanne and was charged with assault and battery of an ex-employee. This was followed by numerous members leaving the Power Team to form a new ministry called Team Impact. In 2002, the Power Team filed for bankruptcy protection.

Todd Keene has been the president since 2003.

== TV appearances ==
In 1999, The Power Team portrayed themselves in "The Principal" episode of Walker, Texas Ranger (motivating a high school of wayward students).

The Power Team briefly appeared in a July 22, 2008 episode of America's Got Talent, performing stunts including: running through 2x4s bursting into flames and running into an 8-foot wall of ice head and shoulders first. Host Piers Morgan remarked, "You must be bonkers." The team was not selected to go on to the semi-finals.

They also appeared during The American Bible Challenge on GSN.

An animation Power Team appeared on American Dad! during season 15, in the "Railroaded" episode.

A similar group called the God Squad, which appears in Season 2 of the HBO series The Righteous Gemstones, was based on the Power Team.

== Documentary ==
In 2004, an independent team of documentary filmmakers began filming The Power Team. The film, titled "Born Again: The Power Team Story", chronicles the 30-year history of the team. It details the familial, emotional, spiritual and physical sacrifices they make to preach the gospel. It was directed by Matthew Luem, produced by James L Reid & Scarlett Lam, filmed by Chaz Zelus, and written by Greg Fiering. The feature-length documentary was released in 2015.

== Media ==
- John Jacobs & The Power Team – 1990 Frontline Records, 1 hour VHS video (V09085)
- John Jacobs & The Power Team – 1990 Frontline Records, CD (CD09085) & Cassette (C09085)

== See also ==
- Muscular Christianity
