= One More Song for You =

Studio album by the Imperials
- Released: 1979
- Studio: Jennifudy Studios, North Hollywood, CA; Hollywood Central Recorders, Los Angeles, CA
- Genre: Contemporary Christian music; Christian pop; inspirational
- Length: 34:02
- Label: DaySpring/Word Records
- Producer: Michael Omartian

The Imperials chronology
Heed the Call (1979)	One More Song for You (1979)	Christmas with the Imperials (1980)

Professional ratings
Review scores
Source	Rating
AllMusic	2/5 stars

One More Song for You is the 26th studio album by the Christian music group the Imperials, released in late 1979 on DaySpring Records. It was the first of two albums that the group collaborated with well-known musician/producer Michael Omartian, moving them to a more contemporary pop sound, with the second being their next album Priority (1980). "I'm Forgiven" went to number one on the Christian radio charts and stayed there for 13 weeks. The Imperials were winners at the 12th GMA Dove Awards winning three for Group of the Year, Artist of the Year and Pop/Contemporary Album of the Year with lead singer Russ Taff winning Male Vocalist of the Year. One More Song for You was nominated for a Grammy Award for Best Gospel Performance, Contemporary or Inspirational at the 23rd Grammy Awards. The album reached number one on the Billboard Inspirational Albums chart. CCM Magazine has ranked One More Song for You at number 75 on their 2001 book The 100 Greatest Albums in Christian Music.

== Track listing ==
No.	Title	Writer(s)	Length
1.	"What I Can Do For You"	Michael Omartian, Stormie Omartian	2:59
2.	"I'm Forgiven"	M. Omartian, Bruce Hibbard, Hadley Hockensmith	3:54
3.	"All My Life"	M. Omartian, S. Omartian	3:24
4.	"Living Without Your Love"	Tom Hemby	3:27
5.	"Eagle Song"	Russ Taff, Tori Taff	3:14
6.	"Closer Than Ever"	M. Omartian, S, Omartian	4:23
7.	"One More Song for You"	M. Omartian, S. Omartian	4:38
8.	"Higher Power"	Denny Correll	4:20
9.	"More Like You"	M. Omartian, S. Omartian	3:30

== Personnel ==
The Imperials

- Russ Taff – lead vocals
- Jim Murray – tenor, vocals
- David Will – baritone, vocals
- Armond Morales – bass, vocals

Musicians

- Michael Omartian – keyboards, percussion, arrangements
- Marty Walsh – guitars
- Abraham Laboriel – bass
- Paul Leim – drums
- Victor Feldman – congas
- Kim Hutchcroft – horns, sax solos
- Jackie Kelso – horns
- Dick Hyde – horns
- Chuck Findley – horns
- Steve Madaio – horns
- Assa Drori – concertmaster
- Myrna Matthews – additional backing vocals
- Marti McCall – additional backing vocals
- Stormie Omartian – additional backing vocals

Production

- Michael Omartian – producer
- John Guess – engineer, remixing
- John Banuelos – additional engineer
- Jack Lees – additional engineer
- Bernie Grundman – mastering at A&M Mastering Studios (Hollywood, California)
- Bob Anderson – album design, photography

== Charts ==
Chart (1980)	Peak position
US Top Inspirational Albums (Billboard)	1

=== Radio singles ===
Year	Singles	Peak positions
Year	Singles	CCM AC
1980	"What I Can Do For You"	12
1980	"I'm Forgiven"	1
1980	"One More Song for You"	10

== Accolades ==
GMA Dove Awards

- 1981 Group of the Year
- 1981 Artist of the Year

Year	Winner	Category
1981	One More Song for You	Pop/Contemporary Album of the Year
1981	Russ Taff (lead singer)	Male Vocalist of the Year
