= Dick and Melodie Tunney =

American singing duo

Dick and Melodie Tunney are a husband-and-wife duo who have written and performed with many contemporary Christian artists. They have written songs for Sandi Patti, Larnelle Harris and other Christian artists.

== Biography ==
Melodie was raised in a minister of music's home in Fort Worth, and Dick came from a working family in Ohio. Both were musicians at an early age. In the late 1970s, they joined a Christian group called "Truth," which brought the two together. After 18 months of constant touring, Dick joined the award-winning group the Imperials. Six months later the couple married and settled in Nashville, Tennessee. Throughout the 1980s, Dick and Melodie focused on songwriting and studio work, and immersed themselves in Nashville's creative community. Mel then formed the studio vocal group First Call with fellow studio singers Bonnie Keen and Marty McCall. In 1986, Christian artist Sandi Patty hired Dick as musical director and pianist, and First Call as her backup group. The "Let There Be Praise Tour" covered 150 cities in 18 months and launched First Call on a tour of their own while Dick remained on tour with Sandi.

After the births of two daughters over a 15-month period, Dick and Melodie chose to return home from touring. Within a year, their first joint recording project, Let the Dreamers Dream, was released by Warner Alliance in 1991. Soon the couple found themselves traveling nearly every weekend to local churches across America, sharing a collection of Tunney songs aimed at Christians. All told, Dick and Mel spent a dozen years traveling to more than 400 churches nationwide.

As their daughters grew into their high school years, the Tunneys devoted themselves to their local church's worship ministry the expansion of Dick's studio role as producer–arranger, so they could be closer to home. Mel continued to work as a session singer in Nashville, and Dick found himself recording and conducting ensembles like the London Philharmonic Orchestra, The Irish Film Orchestra and the City of Prague Philharmonic.

In 2006, the First Baptist Church of Columbia, Tennessee invited Dick and Mel to lead the worship ministry of its growing congregation, first on an interim basis and then as worship leaders/artists in residence. Soon thereafter, Steve Green Ministries invited Dick to tour with him as pianist and musical director.

== Awards ==
The Tunneys' have received ten Dove Awards, nearly 30 Dove nominations and a Grammy Award (for “How Excellent Is Thy Name”, recorded by Larnelle Harris). Their songs have appeared in print music and church hymnals, and Dick and Mel have shared the stage with many Christian artists. They have also been in involved in many recording projects as studio vocalist, keyboard player, arranger(s) and producer. They have recorded eight albums together, and Dick has recorded five solo instrumental albums. The couple has penned more than 150 songs, many of which have been recorded by other Christian artists.
