= 13th GMA Dove Awards =

1982 US music awards ceremony

- Date: 1982
- Location: Nashville, Tennessee

The 13th Annual GMA Dove Awards were held on 1982 recognizing accomplishments of musicians for the year 1981. The show was held in Nashville, Tennessee.
