= Andrus, Blackwood and Company =

Andrus, Blackwood & Company

Background information
- Origin: United States
- Genres: Contemporary Christian
- Occupation: Singers
- Instrument: Voice
- Years active: 1977–1984
- Label: Greentree
- Members: Sherman Andrus; Terry Blackwood

Andrus, Blackwood & Company was a racially integrated contemporary Christian music group, releasing six albums between 1977 and 1984. The group was composed of two former members of The Imperials, Sherman Andrus and Terry Blackwood as co-lead vocalists. Rounding out the group's first touring band in 1977 were Rocky Laughlin on bass, Tim Marsh on drums, Bob Villareal on guitar and backing vocals, and Karen Voegtlin on keyboards and backing vocals. Other alternating band members between 1978 and 1986 included Billy Blackwood (cousin of Terry Blackwood) on drums, John Mays on bass, Mark Hughes on bass (later with Dobie Gray and owner the world's largest used music store, Mr Mark's Music in Nashville (1980–90, 2000-2016-current), Jeff Chambers on guitars, Randy Dennis on keyboards, David Ennis (later with country group Restless Heart) on keyboards, Gerritt Wilson on Synths, David Hassell on keyboards and vocals, Mark Burchfield on bass. David Hassell also worked as office manager and tour manager for the group. The group's final performance came in June 1986 at Six Flags theme park in Chicago, IL.

At the time the two had left the Imperials, it was one of the most commercially successful acts in CCM. While not songwriters themselves, Andrus and Blackwood were good judges of what CCM radio wanted, developing relationships with Bruce Hibbard, Hadley Hockensmith, Phil Johnson and Tim Sheppard among others. It paid off with a top 10 title track to their 1979 sophomore double-album Following You. During the group's tenure, they placed eight hits on the Christian radio charts including 3 No. 1 hits, "Jesus, You're So Wonderful" (20 weeks, 1980–1981).,"Soldier of the Light" (23 weeks, 1981). and "Step Out of the Night" (4 weeks, 1983). The group appeared as headliners for every major Christian music festival during the late 1970s to mid-1980s, including Disney's Night of Joy, They also appeared on PBS's Austin City Limits musical TV program in 1983.

Andrus and Blackwood occasionally performed in group now called "Elvis' Imperials" with another former Imperials member, Joe Moscheo until Moscheo's death in 2016.

== Discography ==
Year	Album	Record label	Record producer
1977	Grand Opening	Greentree	Phil Johnson
1978	Following You	Greentree	Phil Johnson
1980	Live	Greentree	Phil Johnson
1981	Soldiers of the Light	Greentree	Phil Johnson
1982	Step Out of the Night	Greentree	Phil Johnson
1984	Holiday	Nissi	John Rosasco
1984	Best of Andrus, Blackwood & Co.	Greentree	Phil Johnson
