= Terry Blackwood =

American contemporary Christian musician

Terry Blackwood (born 21 October 1943) is a contemporary Christian musician who is lead singer for Christian pop act The Imperials. He joined the group in 1967 and left in 1976, when he and fellow Imperial Sherman Andrus formed Andrus, Blackwood and Company.

His father was Doyle Blackwood, a co-founder of the Blackwood Brothers Quartet.
