= 11th GMA Dove Awards =

1980 US music awards ceremony

- Date: April 1, 1980
- Location: Nashville, Tennessee

The 11th Annual GMA Dove Awards was the first Dove Awards held during Gospel Music Week in April 1980, accomplishments of musicians for the "long" period between the September 1978 awards show and the new date of April 1980. The show was held in Nashville, Tennessee.
