= 10th GMA Dove Awards =

1978 US music awards ceremony

- Date: 1978
- Location: Nashville, Tennessee

The 10th Annual GMA Dove Awards were held during the National Quartet Convention recognizing accomplishments of musicians for the year. The show was held in Nashville, Tennessee.
