= Pam Mark Hall =

American singer-songwriter

- Born: Pamela Ann Mark
- Origin: San Bernardino, California
- Genres: folk rock, gospel, blues, soul, story songs
- Occupations: Singer, songwriter, musician and producer

Pam Mark Hall (born 1951 as Pamela Ann Mark in San Bernardino, California) is an American singer and songwriter of Christian music.
