= 12th GMA Dove Awards =

1981 US music awards ceremony

- Date: 1981
- Location: Nashville, Tennessee

The 12th Annual GMA Dove Awards were held on 1981 recognizing accomplishments of musicians for the year 1980. The show was held in Nashville, Tennessee.
