= Paul Smith (Christian music singer) =

American singer

- Born: Paul Charles Smith; October 17, 1953 (age 72)
- Origin: Waco, Texas, United States
- Genres: Contemporary Christian
- Occupations: Singer, songwriter
- Instrument: Voice
- Years active: 1981—present
- Formerly of: The Imperials
- Website: Official website

Paul Charles Smith is a Contemporary Christian Music performer and songwriter. He is best remembered for his early years with influential gospel group The Imperials. Smith spent four years with that group, recording four albums and one live video. Smith was inducted into the Gospel Music Association's Gospel Music Hall of Fame as a member of The Imperials. He has recorded several solo albums and is a songwriter.

== Early career ==
Smith began his musical career in 1981 with The Imperials, following the departure of Russ Taff. Smith was familiar with the group through his booking them for concerts at Baylor University—where he was attending. Smith finished out the "Priority tour" and rapidly earned the respect of The Imperials' fans. For the 1982 album Stand By The Power, Smith co-wrote the title track and the hit "Lord of The Harvest." He also co-wrote the 1985 Larnelle Harris hit "How Excellent Is Thy Name," for which he has won a GMA Dove Award with Dick and Melodie Tunney.

In 1983, The Imperials released Side by Side. It was a double record set featuring five solo performances from each member. Smith had the last five songs on the album. Side By Side won the Dove Award for 1984 Pop/Contemporary Album of The Year. Smith recorded four albums and one live video with The Imperials before leaving the group in 1985. He continued to submit songs to The Imperials—Including his song "Wings of Love," which was recorded by the group in 1987.

=== Solo ===
In 1986, Smith signed with Dayspring Records a division of the Word Records. Live and Learn was a successful album in the Christian music marketplace. He only recorded three albums on this label. By 1990, the record label StarSong pulled away from Word Records and became part of Sparrow Records. Many artists including The Imperials had left Word and signed with StarSong, and Smith also made the move. Human Touch was released in 1991, on the strength of its singles "I Got Love" and "Under a Moonlit Night". It would be his only album released on that label.

Smith continued to tour through the early 1990s—but did not have a new album out until 1994—when he signed a contract with Integrity Music to release Extra Measure. The album charted, but the success did not last. He later served as Music Minister at the First Baptist Church of Colleyvile, Texas. In 2006, Smith's long awaited album Soli Deo was released independently. "Soli Deo is not a huge departure from the musical style that made Paul a highly recognizable voice in contemporary Christian music in the '80s."

In 2010, Smith reunited with former Imperials members, Armond Morales and Dave Will, to record and tour.

== Discography ==
=== Solo ===
- 1978: Child of the Father (Post Script Music)
- 1979: Free Man (Post Script Music)
- 1986: Live and Learn (Dayspring/Word)
- 1987: No Frills (Dayspring/Word)
- 1989: Back to Who I Am (Dayspring/Word)
- 1991: Human Touch (StarSong)
- 1994: Extra Measure (Integrity)
- 2006: Soli Deo (Independent)

=== With the Imperials ===
- 1982: Stand By the Power (Dayspring/Word)
- 1983: Side By Side (Dayspring/Word)
- 1984: Sing the Classics (Dayspring/Word)
- 1985: Let the Wind Blow (Myrrh/Word)
- 1986: Old Fashioned Faith (Dayspring/Word) (compilation)
- 1996: The Imperials – Legacy (Word) (compilation)
- 2007: The Definitive Collection (Word) (compilation)
- 2010: Still Standing (Infinity Music)

== Video ==
- 1984: The Imperials 20th Anniversary (Myrrh/Word)
