= Greatest Hits: Time & Again =

Greatest hits album by Twila Paris
- Released: 2001
- Recorded: 1982–2001
- Genre: CCM, praise and worship, inspirational
- Length: 1:14:20
- Label: Sparrow
- Producer: Mark Hammond; Jonathan David Brown; Brown Bannister; Paul Mills; Richard Souther; Charlie Peacock; Darrell A. Harris; Daniel D. McGuffey

Twila Paris chronology
| Bedtime Prayers: Lullabies and Peaceful Worship (2001) | Greatest Hits: Time & Again (2001) | House of Worship (2003) |

Professional ratings
Review scores
| Source | Rating |
|---|---|
| AllMusic | 4.5/5 stars |
| Cross Rhythms | 7/10 squares |

Greatest Hits: Time & Again, also called Greatest Hits, is a 2001 compilation album by Christian singer-songwriter Twila Paris released on Sparrow Records. This collection includes three brand new songs and fifteen previously released songs from her Benson, Star Song and Sparrow albums, including "Destiny" from Paris' 1992 compilation album A Heart That Knows You and "The Time Is Now" from her 1995 EP of the same name. The new tracks were produced by Mark Hammond. The album peaked at number 21 on the Billboard Top Christian Albums chart.

== Track listing ==
All songs written by Twila Paris, except where noted.

| No. | Title | Writer(s) | Original album | Length |
|---|---|---|---|---|
| 1. | "God Is in Control" | | Beyond a Dream | 5:38 |
| 2. | "The Warrior Is a Child" | | The Warrior Is a Child | 4:05 |
| 3. | "Runner" | Paris, Starla Paris | Kingdom Seekers | 4:02 |
| 4. | "Sparks and Shadows" | | New recording | 4:09 |
| 5. | "The Joy of the Lord" | | Sanctuary | 3:20 |
| 6. | "We Will Glorify" | | Keepin' My Eyes On You | 2:29 |
| 7. | "We Bow Down" | | The Warrior Is a Child | 2:42 |
| 8. | "Run to You" | | True North | 3:51 |
| 9. | "(I Am) Not Afraid Anymore" | | Where I Stand | 3:44 |
| 10. | "Faithful Father" | | New recording | 3:46 |
| 11. | "How Beautiful" | | Cry for the Desert | 4:40 |
| 12. | "The Time Is Now" | | The Time Is Now | 5:29 |
| 13. | "Lamb of God" | | Kingdom Seekers | 4:08 |
| 14. | "He Is Exalted" | | Kingdom Seekers | 3:45 |
| 15. | "Every Heart That Is Breaking" | | For Every Heart | 4:13 |
| 16. | "Faithful Friend" (duet with Steven Curtis Chapman) | Paris, Chapman | Where I Stand | 4:57 |
| 17. | "Destiny" | | A Heart That Knows You | 5:12 |
| 18. | "God of Miracles" | | New recording | 4:11 |

== Personnel ==
On the new recordings:

- Twila Paris – lead and all vocals
- Mark Hammond – programming, arrangements
- Micah Wilshire – electric guitar (tracks 4 and 18)
- David Cleveland – acoustic guitar (tracks 4 and 10)

== Production ==
- Lynn Nichols – executive producer
- Mark Hammond – producer
- Ronnie Brookshire – recording
- Todd Robbins – recording
- David Dillbeck – recording
- The Rec Room, Nashville, Tennessee – recording location
- F. Reid Shippen – mixing at Recording Arts Studios, Nashville, Tennessee
- Mike Shike – mix assistant
- Steve Hall – mastering at Future Disc, Hollywood, California
- Jan Cook – art direction
- Philpott Design – design
- Christiév Carothers – creative director
- Russ Harrington – cover photo
- Michael Tighe – additional photography

=== Additional production ===
- Jonathan David Brown – producer (tracks 2, 3, 6, 7, 13–15)
- Brown Bannister – producer (tracks 1, 9, 11, 16)
- Charlie Peacock – producer (track 8)
- Richard Souther – producer (track 5)
- Paul Mills – producer (tracks 1, 17)
- Darrell A. Harris – executive producer (track 12)
- Daniel D. McGuffey – executive producer (track 12)

== Charts ==
| Chart (2001) | Peak position |
|---|---|
| US Top Christian Albums (Billboard) | 21 |
