= A Heart That Knows You =

Compilation album by Twila Paris
- Released: 1992
- Recorded: 1985–1992
- Studio: Quad Studios (Nashville, Tennessee); Javelina (Nashville, Tennessee); Recording Arts (Nashville, Tennessee); Woodland (Nashville, Tennessee); RTC Studio (Franklin, Tennessee); Schnee Studios (North Hollywood, California); The Bunny Hop (Hollywood, California)
- Genre: CCM, praise and worship, inspirational
- Length: 1:11:32
- Label: Star Song
- Producer: Jonathan David Brown: Brown Bannister; Greg Nelson; Paul Mills

Twila Paris chronology
| Sanctuary (1991) | A Heart That Knows You (1992) | Beyond a Dream (1993) |

Professional ratings
Review scores
| Source | Rating |
|---|---|
| AllMusic | 4.5/5 stars |
| Cross Rhythms | 8/10 stars |

A Heart That Knows You is a compilation album by Christian singer-songwriter Twila Paris, released in late 1992 by Star Song Records. The album peaked at number four on the Billboard Top Christian Albums chart. A Heart That Knows You is a collection of Paris' radio hits and praise and worship songs from her Star Song catalog featuring two brand new songs, a re-recording of her first number-one hit "The Warrior Is a Child" and a re-recorded medley of "Do I Trust You", "Keepin' My Eyes on You", and "We Will Glorify". The new recordings were produced by Greg Nelson and Paul Mills. In 1993, Paris won her first of three-consecutive Female Vocalist of the Year titles at the GMA Dove Awards. A music video was made for "Destiny" to promote the album.

== Track listing ==
All songs written by Twila Paris, except where noted.

| No. | Title | Writer(s) | Original album | Length |
|---|---|---|---|---|
| 1. | "A Heart That Knows You" (*) | | New recording | 4:41 |
| 2. | "Destiny" (**) | | New recording | 5:12 |
| 3. | "How Beautiful" (***) | | Cry for the Desert | 4:41 |
| 4. | "I See You Standing" (***) | | Cry for the Desert | 4:05 |
| 5. | "Every Heart That is Breaking" (^) | | For Every Heart | 4:11 |
| 6. | "Prince of Peace" (^) | | Same Girl | 4:37 |
| 7. | "Wandering Pilgrim" (^) | | It's the Thought... | 4:06 |
| 8. | "Runner" (^) | T. Paris, Starla Paris | Kingdom Seekers | 4:03 |
| 9. | "The Warrior Is a Child" (**) | | New recording, originally from The Warrior Is a Child | 4:07 |
| 10. | "Holy is the Lord" (^) | | Same Girl | 3:26 |
| 11. | "Sweet Victory" (^) | | For Every Heart | 4:28 |
| 12. | "True Friend" (^) | | For Every Heart | 2:59 |
| 13. | "Bonded Together" (^) | | Same Girl | 4:58 |
| 14. | "Release of the Spirit/He is Exalted" (^) | | Kingdom Seekers | 5:59 |
| 15. | "Lamb of God" (^) | | Kingdom Seekers | 4:10 |
| 16. | "Do I Trust You Medley: Do I Trust You/Keepin' My Eyes On You/We Will Glorify" (*) | | New recording | 5:49 |

Note:

- (*) - tracks produced by Greg Nelson
- (**) - tracks produced by Paul Mills
- (***) - tracks produced by Brown Bannister
- (^) - tracks produced by Jonathan David Brown

== Personnel ==
Tracks 1, 2, 9 & 16

- Twila Paris – vocals
- Robbie Buchanan – keyboards (1, 16), programming (1, 16), arrangements (1)
- Paul Mills – keyboards (2), programming (2), string arrangements (9)
- Brian Green – acoustic piano (9)
- Dann Huff – guitars (1)
- Michael Landau – guitars (1, 16)
- Jerry McPherson – guitars (2)
- Neil Stubenhaus – bass (1, 16)
- Jimmie Lee Sloas – bass (2)
- Carlos Vega – drums (1)
- Mark Hammond – drums (2), drum programming (2)
- Jeff Balding – drum programming (16)
- Mark Douthit – sopranino saxophone (16)
- The Nashville String Machine – strings (1)
- Alan Moore – string arrangements (1), BGV arrangements (1)
- Carl Gorodetzky – string contractor (9), violin (9)
- Bob Mason – cello (9)
- Jim Grosjean – viola (9)
- Pamela Sixfin – violin (9)
- Greg Nelson – arrangements (16)
- Beverly Darnall – backing vocals (1)
- Stephanie Hall – backing vocals (1)
- Mark Ivey – backing vocals (1)
- Bonnie Keen – backing vocals (1)
- Marty McCall – backing vocals (1)
- Mervyn Warren – backing vocals (1)
- Lisa Bevill – backing vocals (2)
- Chris Harris – backing vocals (2)
- Guy Penrod – backing vocals (2)
- Chris Willis – backing vocals (16)

== Production ==
- Darrell A. Harris – executive producer
- Jack Wright – executive producer
- Holly Krig-Smith – production coordinator (1, 16)
- Buddy Jackson – art direction
- Toni Thigpen – art direction
- S. Combs – design
- Mark Tucker – photography

Technical

- Doug Sax – mastering at The Mastering Lab (Hollywood, California)
- Jeff Balding – engineer (1, 16), mixing (1, 16)
- Paul Mills – recording (2), mixing (2, 9), additional recording (9)
- Lynn Fuston – recording (9)
- Tony Sheppard – additional engineer (1, 16)
- Carry Summers – chief assistant engineer (1, 16), mix assistant (1, 16)
- Robert Charles – assistant engineer (1, 16)
- Amy Hughes – assistant engineer (1, 16)
- Bob Loftus – assistant engineer (1, 16)
- Brett Perry – assistant engineer (1, 16)
- Rick Cobble – recording assistant (9)

== Charts ==
| Chart (1993) | Peak position |
|---|---|
| US Top Christian Albums (Billboard) | 4 |

=== Radio singles ===
| Year | Single | Peak positions |
| Year | Single | CCM AC |
|---|---|---|
| 1992–93 | "Destiny" | 1 |
| 1993 | "A Heart That Knows You" | 5 |

== Accolades ==
GMA Dove Awards

- 1993, 1994 Female Vocalist of the Year
