= Beyond a Dream (Twila Paris album) =

Studio album by Twila Paris
- Released: 1993
- Studio: Castle Recording Studios and RTC Studio (Franklin, Tennessee); The Dugout and Secret Sound Studios (Nashville, Tennessee)
- Genre: CCM, Christian pop, inspirational
- Length: 53:39
- Label: Star Song
- Producer: Brown Bannister; Paul Mills

Twila Paris chronology
A Heart That Knows You (1992)	Beyond a Dream (1993)	The Time Is Now (1995)

Beyond a Dream is the tenth studio album by Christian singer-songwriter Twila Paris, released in late 1993 by Star Song Records. Paris reunited with producer Brown Bannister, who produced her 1990 album Cry for the Desert and also with Paul Mills who produced two tracks from her 1992 compilation album A Heart That Knows You. The album topped the Billboard Top Christian Albums chart, giving Paris her first number-one album. In 1995, Paris won her third-consecutive Female Vocalist of the Year title and also won Song of the Year for writing her number-one Christian AC hit "God Is in Control" at the 26th GMA Dove Awards. Music videos were made for "God Is in Control" and "What Am I Without You?"

== Track listing ==
All songs written by Twila Paris.

1. "God Is in Control" - 5:45
2. "Watch and Pray" - 5:29
3. "Neither Will I" - 5:16
4. "All About You" - 5:48
5. "Visitor from Heaven" - 4:57
6. "Seventy Years Ago" - 5:24
7. "I Will Worship" - 3:31
8. "All My Heart" - 4:41
9. "Rescue the Prisoner" - 4:19
10. "What Am I Without You?" - 5:23
11. "The Light is Shining" - 3:06

== Personnel ==
- Twila Paris – lead vocals, backing vocals (5, 7)
- Alan Pasqua – keyboards
- Blair Masters – keyboards (1–3, 7–9), horns (1)
- John Barlow Jarvis – acoustic piano (1, 2, 4, 6–9)
- Carl Marsh – horns (1), strings (5, 6, 10), tin whistle (7), additional keyboards (10)
- Shane Keister – acoustic piano (3, 5, 10, 11)
- Paul Mills – keyboards (5, 10, 11)
- Tom Hemby – acoustic guitar (1, 2, 4, 6, 7), mandolin (6, 7), dobro (9)
- Dann Huff – electric guitar (1–10)
- Jerry McPherson – electric guitar (1–10)
- Wayne Kirkpatrick – acoustic guitar (3), backing vocals (3)
- Tommy Sims – bass (4–6)
- Paul Leim – drums (1–10)
- Terry McMillan – percussion (2, 3)
- Chris Eaton – backing vocals (1–4, 6, 7, 9)
- Michael Mellett – backing vocals (1, 4, 7, 9)
- Chris Rodriguez – backing vocals (1–4, 8, 9)
- Lisa Bevill – backing vocals (2)
- Michael Black – backing vocals (2, 4)
- Kelly Willard – backing vocals (6)

Production

- Darrell A. Harris – executive producer
- Brown Bannister – producer, overdub recording, mixing (11)
- Paul Mills – producer, overdub recording, mixing (11)
- Jeff Balding – track recording, mixing (1–9)
- Steve Bishir – overdub recording
- Lynn Fuston – mixing (10)
- Carry Summers – track recording assistant, mix assistant
- Paula Montondo – mix assistant
- Wayne Mehl – overdub recording assistant
- Martin Woodlee – overdub recording assistant
- Doug Sax – mastering at The Mastering Lab (Hollywood, California)
- Vicki Dvoracek – A&R
- Traci Sterling – production coordinator
- Toni Fitzpenn – art direction
- The Riordon Design Group, Inc. – art direction
- Mark Tucker – photography
- Proper Management – management

== Critical reception ==
Professional ratings
Review scores
Source	Rating
AllMusic	3/5 stars
Cross Rhythms	9/10 stars

Thom Granger of AllMusic said that Paris "spun a few heads with this one, featuring her most contemporary material to date, and a bit of a new and more confident vocal approach to match it."

Chris Berry of Cross Rhythms said that with a little help from Brown Bannister, Paris "has re-invented herself as a CCM, rather than a MOR, singer and surged back with a brilliant, hook-filled set of radio-friendly songs which will surely prove to be her most successful album ever." Berry also said that Paris' "best songs have always been those intimate, baring the soul numbers and she doesn't disappoint. 'Neither Will I' is as surefire a No 1 hit in the US CCM chart as I have heard in ages. If you've grown up thinking Amy Grant held all the aces in this department then think again, Twila's up there too."

== Charts ==
Chart (1994)	Peak position
US Top Christian Albums (Billboard)	1

=== Year-end charts ===
Chart (1994)	Position
US Top Christian Albums (Billboard)	4

=== Radio singles ===
Year	Single	Peak positions	
Year	Single	CCM AC	CCM CHR
1994	"God Is in Control"	1	14
1994	"Neither Will I"	1	—
1994	"Watch and Pray"	2	—
1994	"Seventy Years Ago"	4	—

== Accolades ==
GMA Dove Awards

- Female Vocalist of the Year

Year	Winner	Category
1995	"God Is in Control"	Song of the Year
