= Same Girl (Twila Paris album) =

Studio album by Twila Paris
- Released: 1987
- Studio: Mama Jo's Recording Studio (North Hollywood, California); OmniSound Studios and Hummingbird Sound Studios (Nashville, Tennessee); The Bennett House (Franklin, Tennessee)
- Genre: CCM, inspirational, praise and worship
- Length: 40:46
- Label: Star Song
- Producer: Jonathan David Brown

Twila Paris chronology
Kingdom Seekers (1985)	Same Girl (1987)	For Every Heart (1988)

Professional ratings
Review scores
Source	Rating
AllMusic	2/5 stars

Same Girl is the fifth studio album by Christian singer-songwriter Twila Paris, released in 1987 by Star Song Records. Paris was nominated in two categories at the 19th GMA Dove Awards for Female Vocalist of the Year and Pop/Contemporary Album of the Year for Same Girl. Christian recording artist and guitar player Phil Keaggy provides an acoustic guitar solo on the track "I Feel It." The album peaked at number six on the Billboard Top Inspirational Albums chart.

== Track listing ==
All songs written by Twila Paris.

1. "Holy is the Lord" - 3:25
2. "Bonded Together" - 4:56
3. "Running to the Rescue - 3:22
4. "Send Me" - 4:42
5. "Same Girl" - 4:23
6. "Prince of Peace" - 4:34
7. "Let No Man Take Your Crown" - 3:32
8. "I Feel It" - 4:14
9. "Throne Room Suite" - 7:38

== Personnel ==
- Twila Paris – lead vocals, backing vocals (1, 2)
- Carl Marsh – keyboards, Fairlight programming, track arrangements, string arrangements (1, 5, 6, 9)
- Eric Persing – additional synthesizers (4, 8)
- Rhett Lawrence – Fairlight percussion (6), additional synthesizers (9)
- Hadley Hockensmith – guitars (1–4, 6, 7, 9)
- Don Potter – acoustic guitar (1, 5, 9)
- Michael Demus – guitars (5, 6, 8)
- Phil Keaggy – acoustic guitar solo (8)
- Abraham Laboriel – bass (1–4, 6–9)
- Mike Brignardello – bass (5)
- Keith Edwards – drums
- Carl Gorodetzky – string concertmaster (1, 5, 6, 9)
- Nashville String Machine – strings (1, 5, 6, 9)
- Matthew Ward – backing vocals (1, 3, 5, 7)
- Jonathan David Brown – backing vocals (2)
- Greg X. Volz – backing vocals (4, 9)
- Ava Aldridge – backing vocals (6, 9)
- Lenny LeBlanc – backing vocals (6, 9)
- Cindy Richardson – backing vocals (6, 9)
- Kelly Willard – backing vocals (7), harmony vocals (8)
- Angie Paris – backing vocals (9)
- Starla Paris – backing vocals (9)
- Oren Paris – backing vocals (9)

Production

- Jonathan David Brown – producer, recording, mixing
- Joe Baldridge – engineer
- Kevin Burns – engineer
- J.T. Cantwell – engineer
- Mike Clute – engineer
- Steve Ford – engineer
- Lynn Fuston – engineer
- Danny Johnson – engineer
- Billy Whittington – engineer
- Jack W. Ross – studio manager for The Bennett House
- Wendy Holt – production manager
- Kelly McBryde – production manager
- Teri Piro – production manager
- Steve Schaffer – production manager
- Ken Wolgemuth – art direction
- Charlie Freeman – photography
- Jack Wright – personal management

== Critical reception ==
Ashleigh Kittle of AllMusic has reviewed Same Girl and said that "it is characteristic of her work during the mid- to late 1980s. She carefully blends a combination of inspirational CCM and praise and worship to create a project that contains its upbeat moments, yet doesn't quite fit the CCM or adult contemporary mold."

== Charts ==
Chart (1987)	Peak position
US Inspirational Albums (Billboard)	6

=== Radio singles ===
Year	Single	Peak positions	
Year	Single	CCM AC	CCM CHR
1987	"Prince of Peace"	1	12
1987	"Holy is the Lord"	7	—
1988	"Bonded Together"	2	—
1988	"Send Me"	4	—
