= House of Worship (album) =

Studio album by Twila Paris
- Released: March 11, 2003
- Studio: Ocean Way Recording Oxford Sound and Quad Studios (Nashville, Tennessee); Sound Kitchen (Franklin, Tennessee)
- Genre: CCM, praise and worship, inspirational
- Length: 47:34
- Label: Sparrow
- Producer: Brown Bannister

Twila Paris chronology
Greatest Hits: Time & Again (2001)	House of Worship (2003)	He Is Exalted: Live Worship (2005)

House of Worship is the fifteenth studio and third praise and worship album by Christian singer-songwriter Twila Paris released on March 11, 2003. It would be Paris' final album on Sparrow Records. The album is Paris' third praise and worship album following Sanctuary and Perennial: Songs for the Seasons of Life. Paris has written and recorded ten original songs and has re-recorded two of her classic songs "We Bow Down" and "We Will Glorify." Paris' original song "God of All" was released as a radio single and has climbed to number one on Radio and Records' Christian Inspirational chart. House of Worship debuted and peaked at number 28 on the Billboard Top Christian Albums chart.

== Track listing ==
All songs written by Twila Paris

1. "God of All" - 5:05
2. "We Bow Down" (re-recording) - 2:52
3. "You Are God" - 4:00
4. "For Eternity" - 3:55
5. "Glory and Honor" - 4:25
6. "Come Emmanuel" - 3:26
7. "Fill My Heart" - 4:49
8. "Make Us One" - 3:22
9. "I Want the World to Know" - 5:09
10. "Not My Own" - 4:16
11. "Christ in Us" - 2:58
12. "We Will Glorify" (re-recording) - 3:17

== Personnel ==
- Twila Paris – lead vocals
- Shane Keister – acoustic piano, Hammond B3 organ
- Jamie Kenney – synthesizers
- Tom Bukovac – electric guitars
- Jerry McPherson – electric guitars
- Tom Hemby – acoustic guitars, mandolin, bass, percussion, arrangements
- Mark Hill – bass
- Leland Sklar – bass
- Dan Needham – drums
- Neal Wilkinson – drums
- Eric Darken – percussion
- Ken Lewis – percussion
- Stuart Duncan – fiddle
- David Davidson – strings
- Carl Gorodetzky – strings
- Bob Mason – strings
- Pamela Sixfin – strings
- Kristin Wilkinson – strings
- Carl Marsh – string arrangements
- Leanne Albrecht – backing vocals
- Lisa Bevill – backing vocals
- Nirva Dorsaint – backing vocals
- Darwin Hobbs – backing vocals
- Fiona Mellett – backing vocals
- Michael Mellett – backing vocals
- Gene Miller – backing vocals
- Christy Nockels – backing vocals
- Leanne Palmore – backing vocals
- Chance Scoggins – backing vocals
- Jerard Woods – backing vocals
- Jovaun Woods – backing vocals

Production

- Brad O'Donnell – executive producer
- Brown Bannister – producer
- Steve Bishir – track recording, overdub recording, mixing
- Bill Deaton – fiddle recording
- Hank Nirider – track recording assistant, overdub recording assistant, mix assistant
- Leslie Richter – track recording assistant
- Fred Paragano – digital editing
- Steve Hall – mastering at Future Disc (North Hollywood, California)
- Traci Sterling Bishir – project manager
- Michelle Bentrem – project management assistant
- Proper Management – management

== Critical reception ==
Professional ratings
Review scores
Source	Rating
AllMusic	3/5 stars
Cross Rhythms	7/10 squares

Ashleigh Kittle of AllMusic said of House of Worship that the album "features ten new songs as well as two new versions of the well-loved classics 'We Bow Down' and 'We Will Glorify.' Highly piano-oriented, the release can best be described as simple, yet moving. The album's production tends toward organic, not striving to dazzle listeners with innovative approaches, instead seeking to draw them into worship through simplicity." Kittle also mentions that "Paris' voice continues to achieve greater maturity with each release. Her vocals are bathed in what seems a contradiction: confident humility. While her voice comes across as confident and strong because of years of experience and faithful use, at the same time her vocals contain a gentle humbleness as she acknowledges her need for God through song."

Tony Cummings of Cross Rhythms has stated that Paris "has always included worship music in her repertoire and in fact her 'We Bow Down' is one of the most popular of all contemporary choruses. There are re-recordings of 'We Bow Down' and 'We Will Glorify' here, plus 10 newly written worship songs. Twila sings with her usual sweet purity and the musicians around her are top class (catch the violin solo by Stuart Duncan on 'You Are God')."

== Charts ==
Chart (2003)	Peak position
US Top Christian Albums (Billboard)	28

=== Radio singles ===
Year	Single	Peak positions
Year	Single	CCM Inspo
2003	"We Bow Down"	3
2003	"God of All"	1
