= The Time Is Now (EP) =

EP by Twila Paris
- Released: 1995
- Genre: CCM, Christian pop, inspirational
- Length: 23:29
- Label: Star Song
- Producer: Darrell A. Harris, Daniel D. McGuffey, Brown Bannister, Paul Mills

Twila Paris chronology
Beyond a Dream (1993)	The Time Is Now (1995)	Where I Stand (1996)

The Time is Now is a 1995 four-song EP by Christian singer-songwriter Twila Paris. This would be her final album on the Star Song label. The EP contains the title song as part of the Global Mission crusade by The Reverend Billy Graham to reach out to the hurting people everywhere who need to hear the true message of hope. A music video was made for the single. The other three songs were previously released from Paris' catalog. The Time is Now debuted and peaked at number 25 on the Billboard Top Christian Albums chart.

== Track listing ==
All songs written by Twila Paris.

No.	Title	Original album	Length
1.	"The Time Is Now" (*)	New recording	6:45
2.	"God is in Control" (**)	Beyond a Dream	5:45
3.	"Destiny" (***)	A Heart That Knows You	5:12
4.	"Nothing but Love" (^)	Cry for the Desert	5:51

Note:

- (*) - executive producers: Darrell A. Harris and Daniel D. McGuffey
- (**) - produced by Brown Bannister and Paul Mills
- (***) - produced by Paul Mills
- (^) - produced by Brown Bannister

== Critical reception ==
Professional ratings
Review scores
Source	Rating
Cross Rhythms	7/10 stars

Lindsey Dennis of Cross Rhythms said of the EP, that Paris' "4-song CD is very pleasing. The first song 'The Time Is Now' is the standout and touches the old heartstrings. The other three songs are from Twila's other albums, so although it's a good CD there were no surprises after the first song." Dennis also admires "Twila's honesty and openness in her write up inside the front cover, especially her prayer. She expresses her wish that those listening to her music will experience the reality and joy of a relationship with Jesus Christ and will always hear his voice above her own."

== Charts ==
Chart (1995)	Peak position
US Top Christian Albums (Billboard)	25

=== Radio singles ===
Year	Single	Peak positions
Year	Single	CCM AC
1995	"The Time Is Now"	1
