= Lord of the Past: A Compilation =

Lord Of The Past: A Compilation

Greatest hits album by Bob Bennett
- Released: 1989
- Genre: CCM
- Label: Urgent Records (Austin, TX)
- Producer: Jonathan David Brown ; Exec Producer Daniel D. Jittu

Bob Bennett chronology
Non-Fiction (1985)	Lord Of The Past: A Compilation (1989)	Songs from Bright Avenue (1991)

Professional ratings
Review scores
Source	Rating
Allmusic	4.5/5 stars

Lord of the Past: A Compilation is a 1989 album by Bob Bennett, his fourth release and only true official 'greatest hits' compilation, including four new songs. The release reached 30th position on Billboard magazine's Top Contemporary Christian chart in 1990. Its title song reached number one on the Christian radio charts in early 1990. In 2013, Urgent Records producer, Phillip Sandifer, was quoted in an interview as saying that the high point of the Urgent Records era was when "Bob Bennett's song 'Lord Of The Past' reached number one on the AC charts."

== Track listing ==
All songs written by Bob Bennett, except where noted.

From First Things First:

1. "Carpenter Gone Bad – 3:23
2. "(I Know That) My Redeemer Lives" (text: Samuel Medley; Tune: "Duke Street", John Hatton; adap. Bob Bennett) – 3:16
3. "You're Welcome Here – 3:31
  From Matters of the Heart:
4. "Matters Of The Heart – 3:30
5. "1951 – 3:06
6. "A Song About Baseball – 3:20
7. "Madness Dancing – 3:16
8. "Come And See – 2:51
9. "Mountain Cathedrals – 4:54
  From Non-Fiction:
10. "Saviour Of The World – 5:44
11. "Still Rolls The Stone – 4:50
  New Songs:
12. "Yours Alone (Words: Bob Bennett, based on "The Lord's Prayer;" Music: Bob Bennett/Roby Duke) – 3:46
13. "Psalm 149:1-4 – 4:49
14. "Man Of The Tombs – 5:54
15. "Lord Of The Past – 5:16

== Personnel ==
Musicians for the tracks new to this recording (12-15) are:

- Bob Bennett – acoustic guitar, vocals, composer
- Jerry McPherson – electric guitar
- Gary Lunn – electric bass
- Marvin Steinberg – drums, percussion
- Reed Arvin – keyboards
- Carl Marsh – Fairlight synthesizer, keyboards, charts, track arrangements
- Michele Wagner – background vocals
- Jonathan David Brown – producer, recording, mixing
- Daniel Jittu, Jeff Straubel, & Marian Peebler – executive producers

== Release history ==
Lord Of The Past: A Compilation was released by Urgent Records in 1989.
