= It's the Thought... =

Studio album by Twila Paris
- Released: 1989
- Recorded: Johnny dB's Basement, Antioch, Tennessee
- Genre: CCM, Christmas music, praise and worship
- Length: 42:29
- Label: Star Song
- Producer: Jonathan David Brown

Twila Paris chronology
For Every Heart (1988)	It's the Thought... (1989)	Cry for the Desert (1990)

Professional ratings
Review scores
Source	Rating
AllMusic	2.5/5 stars

It's the Thought... is a Christmas album and the seventh studio album and by Christian singer-songwriter Twila Paris, released in 1989 by Star Song Records. It was the last album that Paris collaborated with producer Jonathan David Brown. The album is not your typical Christmas record, aside from "White Christmas" used in medley form with "Whiter Than Snow". Paris wrote four original songs and her father Oren Paris II wrote "This World", about the change that the first Christmas had on the entire world. The album debuted and peaked at number 15 on the Billboard Top Inspirational Albums chart.

== Track listing ==
No.	Title	Writer(s)	Length
1.	"Midwinter"	Christina Rossetti, Gustav Holst	4:31
2.	"Alleluia, Christ is Born"	Twila Paris	1:42
3.	"Glory to God"	T. Paris	1:49
4.	"Away in a Manger"	William J. Kirkpatrick, James Ramsey Murray	3:38
5.	"White Christmas/Whiter Than Snow"	Irving Berlin/Traditional	3:51
6.	"It's the Thought"	T. Paris	3:53
7.	"I Saw Three Ships"	William Sandys	4:39
8.	"This World"	Oren Paris II	4:07
9.	"Down in Yon Forest"	Traditional	1:20
10.	"O Holy Night"	Adolphe Adam, John Sullivan Dwight	5:00
11.	"Hallelujah Chorus"	George Frideric Handel	3:51
12.	"Wandering Pilgrim"	T. Paris	4:05

== Personnel ==
- Twila Paris – lead vocals, backing vocals (3)
- Carl Marsh – keyboards, Fairlight III programming, arrangements
- Hal Brown – additional acoustic piano (5)
- Tom Hemby – acoustic guitars, mandolin
- Jerry McPherson – electric guitars
- Gary Lunn – bass
- Mark Hammond – drums
- Eric Darken – percussion
- Lisa Glasgow – backing vocals (1–3, 5, 7, 8)
- Tammy Jensen – backing vocals (1–3, 5, 7, 8)
- Marabeth Jordan – backing vocals (1)
- Tim Marshall – backing vocals (1)
- Leah Taylor – backing vocals (1–3, 5, 7, 8)
- Steven V. Taylor – backing vocals (1–3, 5, 7, 8), BGV arrangements (1–3, 5, 7, 8)
- Raymond Weaver – backing vocals (1–3, 5, 7, 8)
- Greg X. Volz – backing vocals (3)

=== Production ===
- Jonathan David Brown – producer, recording, mixing
- Ken Love – mastering at MasterMix (Nashville, Tennessee)
- Karen Horner – art direction, design
- Toni Thigpen – art direction
- Jackson Design – design
- Paul Micich – illustration

== Critical reception ==
Dacia A. Blodgett-Williams of AllMusic wrote "The ever popular Christian crooner Twila Paris shows the reason for her longevity with this holiday release. Strong vocals and stress-relieving accompaniment are trademarks of the album, and it includes a good mix of contemporary and traditional carols."

== Charts ==
Chart (1989)	Peak position
US Inspirational Albums (Billboard)	15

=== Radio singles ===
Year	Single	Peak positions
Year	Single	CCM AC
1989–90	"Wandering Pilgrim"	27
