= Matters of the Heart (Bob Bennett album) =

Studio album by Bob Bennett
- Released: 1982
- Genre: CCM
- Label: CBS/Priority
- Producer: Jonathan David Brown

Bob Bennett chronology
First Things First (1979)	Matters of the Heart (1982)	Non-Fiction (1985)

Professional ratings
Review scores
Source	Rating
AllMusic	4/5 stars

Matters of the Heart is Bob Bennett's second release.

== Release history ==
Matters of the Heart was released by CBS/Priority in 1982. The album went out of print mid-year when the label ceased operations. In 1985, Star Song re-released the album and went out-of-print by 1987. Urgent Records re-released a cassette version in 1989 and the CD in 1990 in May 2007 it was released digitally at the iTunes Store.

In January 1983, CCM Magazine named it "Album of the Year - 1982", beating Amy Grant's Age to Age. It was later named it as one of the "Top 20 Christian Albums of All Time", and listed at No. 65 in the book CCM Presents: The 100 Greatest Albums in Christian Music.

== Track listing ==
All songs written by Bob Bennett, except where noted.

1. "Matters of the Heart" – 3:30
2. "Falling Stars" – 3:05
3. "Mountain Cathedral" – 4:54
4. "1951" (Jim Fowler/Michael Aguilar/Bob Bennett) – 3:06
5. "A Song About Baseball" – 3:20
6. "Madness Dancing" – 3:16
7. "Together All Alone" – 2:47
8. "Beggar" – 3:55
9. "Come and See" (Bob Bennett/Michael Aguilar) – 2:51
10. "Heart of the Matter" – 6:11

== Personnel ==
- Bob Bennett – acoustic guitar, vocals, composer
- Steve Swinford – acoustic guitar (track 3)
- Hadley Hockensmith – electric guitar
- Don Gerber – banjo
- Mark Davis – hammer dulcimer
- John Patitucci – acoustic and electric bass
- Keith Edwards – drums
- John Ferraro – drums
- Alex MacDougall – percussion
- Roby Duke – background vocals
- Kelly Willard – background vocals
- Jonathan David Brown – producer, recording, mixing
- Smitty Price – keyboards, charts, track arrangements
