= Samuel Medley =

Samuel Medley may refer to:

- Samuel Medley (painter)
- Samuel Medley (minister)
