= For Every Heart (Twila Paris album) =

Studio album by Twila Paris
- Released: 1988
- Studio: Johnny dB's Basement (Antioch, Tennessee); The Pond (Franklin, Tennessee)
- Genre: CCM, inspirational, praise and worship
- Length: 44:34
- Label: Star Song
- Producer: Jonathan David Brown

Twila Paris chronology
| Same Girl (1987) | For Every Heart (1988) | It's the Thought... (1989) |

Professional ratings
Review scores
| Source | Rating |
|---|---|
| AllMusic | 2.5/5 stars |

For Every Heart is the sixth studio album by Christian singer-songwriter Twila Paris, released in 1988 by Star Song Records. The album debuted and peaked at number six on the Billboard Top Inspirational Albums chart. Paris was nominated in two categories at the 20th GMA Dove Awards for Female Vocalist of the Year and Pop/Contemporary Album of the Year. The track "For the Glory of the Lord" has become a modern day hymn and is now sung in churches and congregations. Fellow Christian singer Steve Green has covered the song on his 1988 album Find Us Faithful.

== Track listing ==
All songs written by Twila Paris.

1. "Sweet Victory" - 4:31
2. "Every Heart That is Breaking" - 4:09
3. "Mt. Nebo" (instrumental) - 2:52
4. "All That I Need" - 2:17
5. "True Friend" - 2:57
6. "I Will Never Go" - 5:33
7. "Neverending Love" - 4:45
8. "Peace Be Still" - 3:58
9. "He Is No Fool" - 6:28
10. "You Have Been Good" - 3:44
11. "For the Glory of the Lord" - 3:20

== Personnel ==
- Twila Paris – lead vocals (1, 2, 4–11), backing vocals (2, 4–7, 10, 11)
- George "Smitty" Price – keyboards (1–5, 11), arrangements (1–5, 11)
- Jonathan David Brown – vocoder (1), backing vocals (3, 5, 6, 10, 11)
- Carl Marsh – keyboards (6–10), arrangements (6–10)
- Jerry McPherson – guitars
- John Patitucci – bass (1–5, 7–9, 11)
- Tommy Sims – bass (6, 10)
- Mark Hammond – drums (1–5, 11)
- Keith Edwards – drums (6–10)
- Eric Darken – percussion (1–4, 6, 8, 9, 11)
- Jill Grossman – backing vocals (1)
- Steve Grossman – backing vocals (1)
- Kelly Willard – backing vocals (2, 7, 10)
- Greg X. Volz – backing vocals (9, 11)

Production

- Jonathan David Brown – producer, recording, mixing
- Bret Teegarden – engineer, production assistant
- Joe Baldridge – additional engineer
- Bernie Grundman – mastering at Bernie Grundman Mastering (Hollywood, California)
- Dennas Davis – art direction, design
- Toni Thigpen – art direction
- Glenn Hall – photography
- Jack Wright – management

== Critical reception ==
Ashleigh Kittle of AllMusic said of the album For Every Heart "tackles tough issues such as divorce, fatherless children, unwed pregnancy, starvation, and homeless war veterans. And these issues (only a portion of those covered) are all addressed in the title song. However, as dismal as the album may sound, it is truly a project that communicates a message of hope and sharing: that God loves and longs to comfort every breaking heart. Musically, the release is in traditional Paris fashion, with upbeat, contemporary piano melodies ranging from inspirational to praise and worship to hymn-influenced tracks."

== Charts ==
| Chart (1988) | Peak position |
|---|---|
| US Inspirational Albums (Billboard) | 6 |

=== Radio singles ===
| Year | Single | Peak positions | |
| Year | Single | CCM AC | CCM CHR |
|---|---|---|---|
| 1988 | "Every Heart That Is Breaking" | 1 | 8 |
| 1989 | "True Friend" | 1 | 11 |
| 1989 | "Neverending Love" | 3 | — |
| 1989 | "Sweet Victory" | 1 | — |
