= Non-Fiction (Bob Bennett album) =

Studio album by Bob Bennett
- Released: 1985
- Genre: Contemporary Christian music
- Label: Star Song
- Producer: Jonathan David Brown

Bob Bennett chronology
Matters Of The Heart (1982)	Non-Fiction (1985)	Lord of the Past: A Compilation (1989)

Non-Fiction is Bob Bennett's third release.

== Track listing ==
All songs written by Bob Bennett, except where noted.

1. "Savior Of The World" (Bob Bennett/Michael Aguilar) – 5:44
2. "Waking/Falling Dream" – 2:43
3. "Where The Shadows Fall Like Rain" – 3:43
4. "Numbers Game" – 4:20
5. "The View From Kenmar Lane" – 3:45
6. "Will You Hold On To Me?" – 4:46
7. "Laughing Like You" – 4:48
8. "Voices" – 4:03
9. "Still Rolls The Stone" – 4:50

== Personnel ==
- Bob Bennett – acoustic guitar, vocals, composer
- Wayne Brasel, David Mansfield – electric guitar
- Jim Johnson, John Patitucci – electric bass
- Vinnie Colaiuta, Jim Keltner – drums
- Victor Feldman, Alex MacDougall – percussion
- John Schreiner – keyboards
- Jonathan David Brown – producer, recording, mixing, background vocals
- Smitty Price – keyboards, charts, track arrangements

== Release history ==
Non-Fiction was released by Star Song in 1985.
