= The Warrior Is a Child =

Studio album by Twila Paris
- Released: 1984
- Studio: Mama Jo's Recording Studio (North Hollywood, California); Pomona Studios (Camarillo, California).
- Genre: CCM, inspirational, gospel
- Length: 39:06
- Label: Milk & Honey/Benson
- Producer: Jonathan David Brown

Twila Paris chronology
Keepin' My Eyes On You (1982)	The Warrior Is a Child (1984)	Kingdom Seekers (1985)

The Warrior Is a Child is the third studio album by Christian singer-songwriter Twila Paris. Released in 1984, it would be her final album on Benson Records's Milk & Honey label. The album climbed to number eight on the Billboard Top Inspirational Albums chart. The title song was a hit at Christian radio topping the Christian AC chart for 18 weeks. Paris was nominated in three categories at the 16th GMA Dove Awards for Female Vocalist of the Year, Song of the Year for the title song and Inspirational Album of the Year. The track "We Bow Down" has become one of Paris' praise and worship standards. The title song was ranked at number 48 from CCM Magazine's The 100 Greatest Songs in Christian Music.

== Track listing ==
All songs written by Twila Paris, except where noted.

1. "The Warrior Is a Child" - 4:05
2. "Forever Eyes" - 3:35
3. "Clearer Vision" - 4:14
4. "Do I Trust You" - 4:13
5. "Covenant Keeper" - 2:46
6. "The Battle Is the Lord's" - 2:54
7. "We Bow Down" - 2:43
8. "Leaning on the Everlasting Arms" (Anthony J. Showalter, Elisha Hoffman) (with guest vocals by Jamie Owens-Collins and Kelly Willard) - 4:18
9. "To Do Your Will" - 2:41
10. "Come On In" - 3:59
11. "Praise Him" - 3:36

== Personnel ==
- Twila Paris – lead vocals, backing vocals
- George "Smitty" Price – acoustic piano, Rhodes electric piano, arrangements
- Harlan Rogers – acoustic piano, Hammond B3 organ
- John Andrew Schreiner – synthesizers
- Hadley Hockensmith – acoustic guitars, electric guitars
- Jimmy Johnson – bass
- John Patitucci – bass
- Keith Edwards – drums, percussion
- Cactus Moser – drums
- Victor Feldman – percussion
- Jonathan David Brown – backing vocals, arrangements
- Dan Collins – backing vocals
- Jamie Owens-Collins – backing vocals
- Starla Paris – backing vocals
- Kelly Willard – backing vocals

Production

- Phil Brower – executive producer
- Jonathan David Brown – producer, engineer
- Steve Ford – assistant engineer
- Todd Van Etten – assistant engineer
- Steve Hall – mastering at Future Disc (Hollywood, California)
- Joan Tankersley – art direction, design
- Lori Cooper – layout
- Craig Stewart – photography
- Heidi Schulze – make-up

== Charts ==
Chart (1984)	Peak position
US Inspirational Albums (Billboard)	8

=== Radio singles ===
Year	Single	CCM AC (peak position)
1984	"The Warrior Is a Child"	1
1984	"Do I Trust You"	2
1985	"We Bow Down"	32
1985	"Leaning on the Everlasting Arms"	35
