= Medley (surname) =

Medley is a surname found among English-speaking people.

== People with this surname ==
- Bill Medley (born 1940), one of The Righteous Brothers singing duo
- Dorinda Medley (born 1964), American reality television personality
- Henry Medley (1687–1747), Governor of Newfoundland
- John Medley (1804–1892), first Church of England bishop of Fredericton, New Brunswick, Canada
- Les Medley, Tottenham Hotspur F.C. footballer of the early 1950s
- Linda Medley, American comic book author and illustrator
- Luke Medley, English footballer
- Paul Medley, English rugby player
- Phil Medley, American songwriter
- Robert Medley, English artist and educator
- Samuel Medley (1738–1799), English Baptist minister and hymn-writer
- Samuel Medley (painter) (1769–1857), English painter
- Sue Medley (born 1962), Canadian musician
- William Medley (born 1952), American Catholic priest
- Nik Caner-Medley (born 1983), American basketball player
- Zech Medley (born 2000), English Football player

== People with Medley as a given name ==
- John Medley Wood (1827–1915), South African botanist
- Walter Medley Tattersall (1882–1943), British biologist

== See also ==
- Medley (disambiguation)
