= Keepin' My Eyes On You =

Studio album by Twila Paris
- Released: 1982
- Studio: Weddington Studios, North Hollywood, California
- Genre: CCM, inspirational, gospel
- Length: 33:03
- Label: Milk & Honey/Benson
- Producer: Jonathan David Brown

Twila Paris chronology
Knowin' You're Around (1981)	Keepin' My Eyes On You (1982)	The Warrior Is a Child (1984)

Professional ratings
Review scores
Source	Rating
AllMusic	2.5/5 stars

Keepin' My Eyes On You is the second album by Christian singer-songwriter Twila Paris, released in 1982 by Milk & Honey Records. Paris' first two radio singles "Humility" and the title song were both placed in the Top 20 on the Christian radio charts and her song "We Will Gloify" has become a praise and worship standard. Starting with this album produced by Jonathan David Brown, Paris' future albums would be produced by Brown up until 1989.

== Track listings ==
All songs written by Twila Paris.

1. "We Will Glorify" - 2:29
2. "Humility" - 4:33
3. "Keepin' My Eyes On You" - 3:58
4. "Make Me New" - 4:06
5. "I Belong to You" - 2:49
6. "Thank You for Keepin' Your Hand on Me" - 2:37
7. "It's So Easy" - 3:55
8. "I Commit My Love to You" - 4:14
9. "If the Feelings Ever Go Away" - 3:54
10. "Lookin' Up" - 2:55

== Personnel ==
- Twila Paris – lead vocals, backing vocals (5, 10)
- George "Smitty" Price – keyboards, arrangements
- Hadley Hockensmith – guitars
- Marty Walsh – guitars
- John Patitucci – bass
- Keith Edwards – drums
- Alex MacDougall – percussion
- Karl Denson – saxophones
- Ron Stout – trumpet
- John Phillips – woodwinds, solos
- Dan Collins – backing vocals (1–4, 6–9)
- Jamie Owens-Collins – backing vocals (1, 3)
- Bruce Hibbard – backing vocals (5, 10)

Production

- Phil Brower – executive producer
- Jonathan David Brown – producer, arrangements, engineer
- Wally Grant – assistant engineer
- David Schober – assistant engineer
- Michael Harris Design – art direction, design
- Michael Borum – photography

== Radio singles ==
Year	Single	Peak positions
Year	Single	CCM AC
1982	"Humility"	16
1983	"Keepin' My Eyes On You"	12
1983	"I Commit My Love to You"	27
