= The View from Here =

The View from Here may refer to:

- The View from Here (album), a 2002 album by Bob Bennett
- The View from Here (TV series), a Canadian television series
- The View from Here: Conversations with Gay and Lesbian Filmmakers, a 2007 book by Matthew Hays
- The View from Here, an album by Shari Ulrich
- The View from Here (column), a column in Life magazine by Loudon Wainwright

== See also ==
- Silverlake Life: The View from Here, a 1993 documentary film
