= Perennial: Songs for the Seasons of Life =

Studio album by Twila Paris
- Released: March 24, 1998
- Studio: Sound Emporium and The Dugout (Nashville, Tennessee); AIR Studios (London, England); Studio M, St. Paul (St. Paul, Minnesota)
- Genre: CCM, praise and worship, inspirational, hymns
- Length: 42:20
- Label: Sparrow/EMI
- Producer: Brown Bannister

Twila Paris chronology
| Where I Stand (1996) | Perennial: Songs for the Seasons of Life (1998) | True North (1999) |

Professional ratings
Review scores
| Source | Rating |
|---|---|
| AllMusic | 3/5 stars |

Perennial: Songs for the Seasons of Life is the twelfth studio and second praise and worship album by Christian singer-songwriter Twila Paris, released on March 24, 1998 by Sparrow Records.

It is Paris' second praise and worship album since her 1991 Dove Award winning album Sanctuary. The album is more contemporary than Sanctuary, whereas that album was more ethereal and tranquil. Perennial is a combination of hymns and original songs, including a re-recording of her Kingdom Seekers track "Faithful Men." The album peaked at number five on the Billboard Top Christian Albums chart. A concert video was released on VHS called Perennial In Concert: A Season of Worship featuring Paris accompanied by an orchestra performing songs from Perennial. Paris was nominated in two categories at the 30th GMA Dove Awards for Inspirational Album of the Year and Long-Form Video of the Year.

== Track listing ==
| No. | Title | Writer(s) | Length |
|---|---|---|---|
| 1. | "We Seek His Face" | Twila Paris | 5:47 |
| 2. | "Father, We Are Here" | T. Paris | 3:10 |
| 3. | "Come Thou Fount of Every Blessing" | Traditional | 4:05 |
| 4. | "Faithful Men" | T. Paris | 3:13 |
| 5. | "Be Thou My Vision" | Traditional | 3:08 |
| 6. | "Amazing Grace" | John Newton | 4:51 |
| 7. | "Come Thou Fount..." (Reprise) | Traditional | 1:31 |
| 8. | "Fountain of Grace" | T. Paris | 3:28 |
| 9. | "When The Roll Is Called Up Yonder" | James Milton Black | 4:32 |
| 10. | "My Lips Will Praise You" | T. Paris | 4:04 |
| 11. | "Perennial" | T. Paris | 4:31 |

== Personnel ==
- Twila Paris – lead vocals, backing vocals (6)
- Shane Keister – acoustic piano, harmonium, additional keyboards
- Joey Miskulin – accordion (9)
- Tom Hemby – acoustic guitar, mandolin
- Biff Watson – additional acoustic guitar (3, 4)
- Mark Baldwin – additional acoustic guitar (6), gut-string guitar (9)
- Ron Block – additional acoustic guitar (9)
- Leland Sklar – bass
- Steve Brewster – drums, percussion
- Eric Darken – percussion (6, 9)
- John Mock – tin whistle (2, 6)
- Hunter Lee – Uilleann pipes (6)
- Tom Howard – orchestra arrangements, choir arrangements
- Gavyn Wright – concertmaster
- The London Session Orchestra – orchestra
- Dale Warland Singers – backing vocals (1, 3, 5, 7, 10)
- Angel Voices – boys choir (2, 3, 10)
- Robert Prizeman – choir director (2, 3, 10)
- Dan Tyminski – backing vocals (4, 9)

Pre-Production Track Arrangements

- Brown Bannister, Tom Howard, Shane Keister and Twila Paris

Production

- Peter York – executive producer
- Brown Bannister – producer
- Steve Bishir – recording, mixing
- Ben Georgiades – recording assistant
- Hank Nirider – recording assistant, overdub recording, additional engineer, mix assistant
- Craig Thorsen – recording assistant
- Gary Paczosa – overdub recording, additional engineer
- Shane D. Wilson – overdub recording, additional engineer
- Preston Smith – recording for Dale Warland Singers
- Rupert Coulson – orchestra and boy choir recording
- Doug Sax – mastering at The Mastering Lab (Hollywood, California)
- Christiév Carothers – creative direction
- Jan Cook – art direction
- Sarah Watson – design
- Andrew Eccles – photography

== Companion book ==
Paris has also released a companion book called Perennial: Meditations for the Seasons of Life with her sisters Starla with the co-writing and Angie with the illustrations, published by Zondervan Publishing. Paris and Starla share sixty meditations on gardening, recipes and life's lessons, arranged by the four seasons.

== Charts ==
| Chart (1996) | Peak position |
|---|---|
| US Top Christian Albums (Billboard) | 5 |
