= Small Sacrifice =

Studio album by Twila Paris
- Released: December 26, 2007
- Genres: CCM, praise and worship, inspirational
- Length: 44:06
- Labels: Mountain Spring Music, Koch
- Producer: John Hartley

Twila Paris chronology
The Ultimate Collection (2006)	Small Sacrifice (2007)	God Shed His Grace: Songs of Truth and Freedom (2012)

Small Sacrifice is the sixteenth studio album by Christian singer-songwriter Twila Paris. It was originally released independently on Paris' Mountain Spring Music imprint available at her website and at LifeWay Christian Stores in late 2007. The album married the two parts of her career by including both inspirational pop/adult contemporary songs and original praise and worship compositions. Her first radio single from the album "Live to Praise" climbed to number 3 on Radio and Records' Christian Inspirational chart. Small Sacrifice was released for wider distribution by Koch Records on February 24, 2009. Production was handled by John Hartley, who produced Paris' 2001 Dove Award winning children's music album Bedtime Prayers: Lullabies and Peaceful Worship.

== Track listing ==
All songs written by Twila Paris.

1. "We Know Love" - 4:32
2. "I Can Do All Things" - 4:28
3. "You Lead Me" - 3:42
4. "Small Sacrifice" - 3:31
5. "Lord I Need You" - 4:06
6. "Live to Praise" - 3:57
7. "Not Forgotten" - 5:42
8. "There Is a Plan" - 5:16
9. "You Are a Great God" - 4:14
10. "Alleluia" - 4:38

== Personnel ==
- Twila Paris – vocals
- Jamie Kenney – keyboards
- Gary Burnette – guitars
- Chris Graffagnio – guitars
- Chris Donohue – bass
- Dennis Holt – drums, percussion
- Ken Lewis – drums, percussion
- Chris Eaton – backing vocals
- Jennifer Paige – backing vocals
- Chris Rodriguez – backing vocals
- Michelle Tumes – backing vocals

Production

- John Hartley – producer
- Colin Heldt – engineer
- David Schober – engineer, mixing
- John Mayfield – mastering
- Susannah Parrish – graphic design
- Michael Gomez – cover photography
- Norman Miller – management

== Critical reception ==
Professional ratings
Review scores
Source	Rating
Cross Rhythms	8/10 squares

Mark Lawrence of Cross Rhythms said of Small Sacrifice that the album "combines songs for congregational worship such as the piano-driven, hymn-like 'I Can Do All Things' and the upbeat pop of 'We Know Love' with more adult contemporary tracks such as the folksy/Celtic infused 'There Is A Plan' and the hauntingly beautiful ballad 'You Lead Me' which takes the listener on a journey through Psalm 23." Lawrence mentions that the title song and "Lord I Need You" are the quieter tracks "where her voice lifts and gives life to the simple melodies. At times the balladry slips squarely into the middle-of-the-road and the congregational worship songs are just a hotch-potch of tired clichés such as on 'Live To Praise.' But overall Twila sounds as fresh now as she did 25 years ago."

== Radio singles ==
Year	Single	Peak positions
Year	Single	CCM Inspo
2008	"Live to Praise"	3
