= Where I Stand =

Where I Stand may refer to:

- Where I Stand (George Ducas album), 1997
- Where I Stand (Twila Paris album), 1996
- "Where I Stand", a song by Days of the New from Days of the New (1997 album)
- "Where I Stand", a song by Mia Wray included on the soundtrack album Midnight Sun (Original Motion Picture Soundtrack)
