= Where I Stand (Twila Paris album) =

Studio album by Twila Paris
- Released: April 2, 1996
- Studio: Sound Emporium, The Dugout, Quad Studios and OmniSound Studios (Nashville, Tennessee); AIR Studios (London, England)
- Genre: CCM, Christian pop, inspirational
- Length: 52:09
- Label: Sparrow/EMI
- Producer: Brown Bannister

Twila Paris chronology
The Time Is Now (1995)	Where I Stand (1996)	Perennial: Songs for the Seasons of Life (1998)

Where I Stand is the eleventh studio album by Christian singer-songwriter Twila Paris released on April 2, 1996. After being on Star Song Records for more than ten years, Paris signed on with sister label Sparrow Records starting with this release. The album debuted and peaked at number 87 on the Top 200 Albums chart, marking Paris' first time on that chart and number 3 on the Top Christian Albums chart in Billboard magazine. The album's first single "Faithful Friend" is a duet with singer-songwriter (and Sparrow labelmate) Steven Curtis Chapman, which they wrote together and placed in the top 5 on Christian radio and Paris' second single "(I Am) Not Afraid Anymore" reached number 1 on the Christian AC chart.

== Track listing ==
All songs written by Twila Paris, except where noted.

No.	Title	Writer(s)	Length
1.	"Love's Been Following You"		4:42
2.	"Hold On"		5:18
3.	"Band of Survivors"		5:44
4.	"Faithful Friend" (duet with Steven Curtis Chapman)	Paris, Chapman	4:57
5.	"Jesus in You"		4:01
6.	"Honor and Praise"		3:39
7.	"(I Am) Not Afraid Anymore"		4:07
8.	"What Did He Die For?"		5:35
9.	"House of Cards"		4:11
10.	"I Never Get Used to What You Do"		6:14
11.	"I Will Listen"		3:41

== Personnel ==
- Twila Paris – vocals, backing vocals (2)
- Shane Keister – keyboards (1–5, 7–10), acoustic piano (11)
- Blair Masters – programming (6), additional keyboards (10)
- Brian Hughes – electric guitar (1), bouzouki (1), oud (1), acoustic guitar (6)
- Jerry McPherson – electric guitar (1, 2, 4, 5, 7, 9, 10)
- Don Potter – acoustic guitar (1–4, 8–10)
- Dann Huff – electric guitar (3, 8)
- Gordon Kennedy – electric guitar (3, 5, 7)
- Darrell Scott – acoustic guitar (5, 7)
- Mike Brignardello – bass (1–3, 8–10)
- David Hungate – bass (4, 5, 7)
- Steve Brewster – drums (1–3, 5, 7–10)
- Paul Leim – drums (4)
- David Hamilton – string arrangements (2)
- Jeremy Lubbock – string arrangements (4)
- Conni Ellisor – string arrangements (8)
- Ronn Huff – string arrangements (11)
- Gavyn Wright – concertmaster (2, 4, 8)
- The London Session Orchestra – strings (2, 4, 8)
- John Catchings – cello (11)
- Bob Mason – cello (11)
- Carole Rabinowitz – cello (11)
- Kristin Wilkinson – viola (11)
- Chris Eaton – backing vocals (1, 2, 5–7, 9, 10)
- Diana DeWitt – backing vocals (1, 3, 7)
- Michael Mellett – backing vocals (1–3, 6, 7, 9, 10)
- Lisa Bevill – backing vocals (2, 3)
- Chris Rodriguez – backing vocals (2, 3, 9, 10)
- Nicol Smith – backing vocals (2, 3)
- Micah Wilshire – backing vocals (3)
- Steven Curtis Chapman – vocals (4)
- Tabitha Fair – backing vocals (9)
- Kim Fleming – backing vocals (9)
- Lisa Keith – backing vocals (10)

Production

- Peter York – executive producer
- Brown Bannister – producer
- Steve Bishir – recording
- Rupert Coulson – string recording
- David Thoener – mixing
- Gary Paczosa – additional engineer
- Carl Meadows – assistant engineer, mix assistant
- Hank Nirider – assistant engineer
- Martin Woodlee – assistant engineer
- Doug Sax – mastering at The Mastering Lab (Hollywood, California)
- Traci Sterling Bishir – production coordinator
- Karen Philpott – art direction
- Torne White – design
- Andrew Eccles – photography
- E.J. Carr – photography
- Jeffrey Tay – wardrobe stylist
- Ilise Harris – hair, make-up
- Proper Management – management

== Critical reception ==
Professional ratings
Review scores
Source	Rating
AllMusic	4.5/5 stars
Cross Rhythms	9/10 stars

Rodney Batdorf of AllMusic has said that Paris "continues to become more pop-oriented with each of her releases, but that's not necessarily a bad thing. Although 'Where I Stand' could be mistaken for any number of records cluttering the adult contemporary radio stations, Paris performs with style and grace, which is what saves the album from being either a sell-out or a wash-out."

Jayne Butler of Cross Rhythms said that "'Where I Stand' has a lot to live up to, but this collection of pop songs and ballads more than meets its expectations. From the first bars of 'Love's Been Following You' to the end of 'I Will Listen,' we are reminded that Twila has been blessed with a wonderful gift of singing and song writing. Overall the sound has been toned down a little from her last album, but there are many potential hits, including 'Faithful Friend,' an impressive duet with Steven Curtis Chapman and 'What Did He Die For?'" Butler also said that the "combination of beautiful songs, an amazing voice, talented musicians and Brown Bannister's production skills make this an outstanding album, not only to be enjoyed, but also to challenge and inspire."

== Charts ==
Chart (1996)	Peak position
US Billboard 200 Albums (Billboard)	87
US Top Christian Albums (Billboard)	3

=== Radio singles ===
Year	Single	Peak positions	
Year	Single	CCM AC	CCM CHR
1996	"Faithful Friend" (with Steven Curtis Chapman)	4	22
1996	"(I Am) Not Afraid Anymore"	1	—
1996	"Love's Been Following You"	26	—
1997	"Jesus in You"	13	—
