= True North (Twila Paris album) =

Studio album by Twila Paris
- Released: September 21, 1999
- Studio: re:think Studio and East Iris Studios (Nashville, Tennessee); The Bennett House (Franklin, Tennessee)
- Genre: Contemporary Christian music
- Length: 58:13
- Label: Sparrow
- Producer: Charlie Peacock

Twila Paris chronology
Perennial: Songs for the Seasons of Life (1998)	True North (1999)	Bedtime Prayers: Lullabies and Peaceful Worship (2001)

True North is the thirteenth studio album by Christian singer-songwriter Twila Paris, released on September 21, 1999, by Sparrow Records. The album is produced by CCM recording artist and musician Charlie Peacock, who has worked with Paris on her 1990 album Cry for the Desert as a backing vocalist and playing keyboards. The last song on True North, "When You Speak to Me" features guest vocals by Jars of Clay's lead singer Dan Haseltine. The album climbed to number 112 on the Top 200 Albums and number 5 on the Top Christian Albums charts in Billboard magazine.

== Track listing ==
All tracks are written by Twila Paris.

No.	Title	Length
1.	"Run to You"	4:18
2.	"True North"	5:25
3.	"No Confidence"	4:36
4.	"Delight My Heart"	6:12
5.	"Wisdom"	5:36
6.	"I Choose Grace"	5:25
7.	"Could You Believe"	5:09
8.	"Daughter of Grace"	5:49
9.	"Once in a Life"	5:39
10.	"Wondering Out Loud"	5:15
11.	"When You Speak to Me" (featuring Dan Haseltine)	4:49
Total length:		58:13

== Critical reception ==
Professional ratings
Review scores
Source	Rating
AllMusic	3/5 stars
Cross Rhythms	8/10 stars

Steve Huey of AllMusic said that Paris "returns to the adult contemporary style for which she's best known, and which made 1996's 'Where I Stand' her most popular record. 'True North' is a solidly constructed record, aimed squarely at radio airplay and highlighted by a few strong, obvious singles, which help make up for the occasional lackluster track."

John Baugh of Cross Rhythms said that True North is "sounding very good indeed, but then that is all you would expect with one Charlie Peacock producing. On the other side you get lyrics that really touch the heart, focusing on Jesus and our response to him, both in an immediate worship context and in our daily lives." Baugh also mentions that the album has "a 'rootsy' feel than some previous recordings and it does allow the radiance of Twila's voice to shine through."

== Personnel ==
- Twila Paris – lead vocals, acoustic piano (6), backing vocals (8)
- Charlie Peacock – electric piano (1–5, 8–10) backing vocals (1, 8), string arrangements (2, 5, 6, 8), ambient synthesizers (6), track arrangements (6, 8, 10)
- Reese Wynans – Hammond B3 organ (1, 5, 8, 9)
- Tony Miracle – keyboards (2, 5, 7), track arrangements (2, 5, 7)
- Mark Hammond – keyboards (3, 4), programming (3, 4), track arrangements (3, 4)
- Pat Coil – grand piano (7, 11)
- Tim Lauer – pump organ (7, 11)
- Scott Denté – acoustic guitars (1, 2, 4, 5, 8–10)
- Kenny Greenberg – electric guitars (1–5, 8–10)
- Mark Baldwin – gut-string guitar (3)
- Jerry McPherson – electric guitars (8)
- Mark Hill – bass (1–4, 7–10)
- James Genus – bass (5), acoustic bass (6)
- Steve Brewster – drums (1–5, 7–10)
- Eric Darken – percussion (1, 2, 5–11)
- Bob Mason – cello (2, 5, 6, 8)
- David Davidson – violin (2, 5, 8)
- Chris Carmichael – fiddle solo (8)
- Tom Howard – orchestra arrangements and conductor (7, 11)
- The Nashville String Machine – orchestra (7, 11)
- Chris Carmichael – fiddle solo (8)
- Chris Eaton – backing vocals (1–5, 8–10)
- Natalie Grant – backing vocals (1, 3–6, 9)
- Darwin Hobbs – backing vocals (1–6, 9)
- Tiffany Palmer – backing vocals (1–6, 9, 10)
- Duawne Starling – backing vocals (6)
- Sam Ashworth – backing vocals (8)
- Dan Haseltine – guest vocals (11)

Production

- Norman Miller – executive producer
- Lynn Nichols – executive producer
- Charlie Peacock – producer
- Richie Biggs – recording, mixing (6–11)
- David Leonard – mixing (1–5)
- David Schober – orchestra recording (7, 11)
- Shane D. Wilson – additional recording (2, 7)
- Shawn McLean – orchestra recording assistant (7, 11)
- Charlie Brocco – mix assistant (1–5)
- David Streit – mix assistant (6–11)
- Gil Gowing – mix assistant (6–11), digital editing, sequencing
- Glenn Meadows – mastering at Masterfonics (Nashville, Tennessee)
- Molly Nicholas – project administrator
- Christiév Carothers – creative director
- Jan Cook – art direction
- Karen Philpott – design
- Michael Tighe – photography
- Gino Tanabe – stylist
- Carol Maxwell – make-up
- Proper Management – management

All track information and credits were taken from the CD liner notes.

== Charts ==
Chart (1999)	Peak position
US Billboard 200 Albums (Billboard)	112
US Top Christian Albums (Billboard)	5

=== Radio singles ===
Year	Single	Peak positions
Year	Single	CCM AC
1999	"Run to You"	1
2000	"True North"	16
