= Knowin' You're Around =

Studio album by Twila Paris
- Released: 1980
- Studio: The Cornerstone Recording Company (Oklahoma City, Oklahoma)
- Genre: Contemporary Christian music, contemporary worship music
- Length: 31:40
- Label: Milk & Honey/Benson
- Producer: Kenny Sarkey; Wayne Boosahda

Twila Paris chronology
| Knowin' You're Around (1980) | Keepin' My Eyes On You (1982) |

Professional ratings
Review scores
| Source | Rating |
|---|---|
| AllMusic | 2/5 stars |

Knowin' You're Around is the debut album by contemporary Christian musician, Twila Paris.

== Track listing ==
All tracks are written by Twila Paris.

| No. | Title | Writer(s) | Length |
|---|---|---|---|
| 1. | "Spring Water" | | 2:47 |
| 2. | "Angel Band" | Traditional; Additional lyrics: Paris | 3:09 |
| 3. | "I'll See You Sunday" | | 3:56 |
| 4. | "Knowin' You're Around" | | 3:28 |
| 5. | "Morning Sunrise" | | 1:58 |
| 6. | "I'm Singing Again" | | 3:13 |
| 7. | "Turn Around" | | 2:58 |
| 8. | "Victory Song" | | 3:05 |
| 9. | "Elijah" | | 2:50 |
| 10. | "Sing Me A Lullaby" | | 4:18 |
| Total length: | | | 31:40 |

== Personnel ==
- Twila Paris – vocals, backing vocals (1), Yamaha CP-30 electronic piano (5), all vocals (7)
- Kenny Sarkey – Yamaha CP-30 electronic piano (1, 3), backing vocals (2, 8), clavinet (3, 9), ARP Omni (3, 7), CP-30 harpsichord (4), acoustic guitar (4), Wurlitzer electric piano (5), Minimoog (5), orchestra bells (5), Fender Rhodes (8), flutes (10)
- Larry Dalton – acoustic piano (2, 4, 8, 10), Fender Rhodes (3, 7), Yamaha CP-30 electronic piano (6, 9)
- Mike Demus – lead guitar (1), rhythm guitar (1), electric guitar (2, 6, 9), acoustic guitar (2, 4)
- Rocky Gribble – rhythm guitar (1), electric guitar (3, 4, 6–8)
- Jim Hochanadel – acoustic 6-string guitar (1), acoustic 12-string guitar (1), saxophone (3, 9)
- David Stearman – acoustic guitar (2, 3, 7), string arrangements (2, 4, 6, 10), acoustic 12-string guitar (8)
- Maurice Love – bass (1–4, 6–9)
- Steve Wright – drums (1–4, 6–9), percussion (2, 8, 10), congas (6)
- Sandra Halgendale – oboe (4)
- Genevieve Winkenbach – harp (4, 10)
- Cornerstone Strings – strings (2, 4, 6, 10)
- Stephanie Boosahda – backing vocals (1, 3, 6, 8, 9)
- Bob Farrell – backing vocals (1, 6, 8, 9)
- Julianne Siens – backing vocals (1, 6, 8, 9)
- Rhonda Tull – backing vocals (3, 8)

=== Production ===
- Wayne Boosahda – producer
- Kenny Sarkey – producer, engineer, mixing
- Drew Barlow – engineer
- Glenn Meadows – mastering at Masterfonics (Nashville, Tennessee)
- Les Summers – design, graphics
- Jim Goss – photography
