= Kingdom Seekers =

Studio album by Twila Paris
- Released: 1985
- Studio: B.T. Productions (Tulsa, Oklahoma); Greystone Studios (Nashville, Tennessee); Mama Jo's Recording Studios (North Hollywood, California); Poiema Studios (Camarillo, California)
- Genre: CCM, inspirational, praise and worship
- Length: 41:34
- Label: Star Song
- Producer: Jonathan David Brown

Twila Paris chronology
The Warrior Is a Child (1984)	Kingdom Seekers (1985)	Same Girl (1987)

Professional ratings
Review scores
Source	Rating
AllMusic	3/5 stars

Kingdom Seekers is the fourth studio album by Christian singer-songwriter Twila Paris. Released in 1985, it is her first album on the Star Song label. The album peaked at number 13 on the Billboard Top Inspirational Albums chart. The first single "Runner" would top the Christian AC chart for 9 weeks and was written by Paris and her sister Starla. The next two singles "Lamb of God" and "He Is Exalted" would become Paris' praise and worship standards. "He Is Exalted" is ranked at number 66 from CCM Magazine's 2006 book CCM Presents: The 100 Greatest Songs in Christian Music and Kingdom Seekers is ranked at number 57 on The 100 Greatest Albums in Christian Music.

== Track listing ==
All songs written by Twila Paris, except where noted.

1. "Runner" (T. Paris, Starla Paris) - 4:01
2. "Center of Your Will" - 4:40
3. "Tellin' the Truth" - 4:18
4. "Language of Disciples" - 3:37
5. "Lamb of God" - 4:05
6. "The Child Inside You" - 4:05
7. "Breaking My Heart" - 3:21
8. "It All Goes Back" - 3:52
9. "Release of the Spirit" (instrumental) - 2:10
10. "He Is Exalted" - 3:44
11. "Faithful Men" - 3:24

== Personnel ==
- Twila Paris – lead vocals, backing vocals
- Carl Marsh – keyboards, Fairlight programming, arrangements
- Rhett Lawrence – synthesizers, additional Fairlight programming
- Marty Walsh – electric guitars
- Leon Gaer – bass guitar
- Keith Edwards – drums
- Alex MacDougall – percussion
- Jonathan David Brown – backing vocals
- Starla Paris – backing vocals

Production

- Jonathan David Brown – producer, recording, mixing
- Bill Cobb – additional engineer
- Bret Teegarden – additional engineer
- Todd Van Etten – additional engineer
- Bernie Grundman – mastering at A&M Studios (Hollywood, California)
- Steve Hall – mastering at Future Disc (Hollywood, California)
- Dave Rogers – art direction, design
- Jeffrey Terreson – illustration
- Jack Wright – management

== Charts ==
Chart (1985)	Peak position
US Inspirational Albums (Billboard)	13

=== Radio singles ===
Year	Single	Peak positions	
Year	Single	CCM AC	CCM CHR
1985-86	"Runner"	1	7
1986	"Lamb of God"	2	—
1986	"It All Goes Back"	—	9
1986	"He Is Exalted"	10	—
1986	"Center of Your Will"	20	—
1987	"Faithful Men"	32	—
