= Quickflight =

Canadian new wave band

- Origin: Kelowna, British Columbia, Canada
- Genres: New wave, contemporary Christian music
- Years active: 1980–1984
- Labels: Tunesmith, Star Song
- Past members: Pete Cordalis; Ric deGroot; Dale Dirksen; Doug Giesbrecht; Gary Hendricks; Greg Johnson

Quickflight was a new wave band formed in Kelowna, British Columbia, Canada. The band released two albums in the early 1980s Breakaway on Tunesmith and their second Decent Beat on Star Song Records.

== History ==
Quickflight's musical style on their first album, Breakaway, was similar to keyboard-oriented, electronic, arena rock bands of the 1980s mixed with new wave and was released on Tunesmith Records in 1980.

Their second album, Decent Beat, was recorded at Little Mountain Sound Studios in Vancouver, British Columbia, Canada, and was released by Star Song Records in 1983. It was ground-breaking because it was one of the first Christian Contemporary releases in which the instruments used consisted almost entirely of synthesizers and sequencers in a style influenced by British synthesizer bands, particularly After the Fire. The album was also one of the first Christian Contemporary Music albums that was digitally mastered although it was never released on CD.

Quickflight toured through the Mid-West and West Coast of the U.S. and parts of Canada, at several outdoor festivals, playing with a variety of Christian artists who included Steve Taylor, Rez Band, Kerry Livgren, Sheila Walsh, Undercover, and Larry Norman.

Through recording at Little Mountain, Ric deGroot met the members of the Capitol Recording group Strange Advance and joined them in 1984. Paul Iverson, an early member of Strange Advance, plays bass on one track on Quickflight's second album, Decent Beat.

== Band members ==
- Ric deGroot
- Dale Dirksen
- Greg Johnson
- Gary Hendricks - drummer
- Pete Cordalis
- Doug Giesbrecht- bass
- Mike King

=== Additional musicians ===
- Paul Iverson
- Scotty Hall
- Chris Livingstone
- Ruth Shareski (Evenden)

== Discography ==
=== Albums ===
- Breakaway (Tunesmith Records, 1980)

1. "Breakaway"
2. "Pink Shirts"
3. "Atheist"
4. "Feelin' Sad"
5. "OK"
6. "Shuttle"
7. "Modern Romans"
8. "Rendezvous"
9. "Between the Lines"
10. "Fine Line"
11. "I Saw You"

- Decent Beat (Star Song, 1983)

1. "Water of Life"
2. "Remote Control"
3. "In the World"
4. "Safety in Numbers"
5. "System Breakdown"
6. "Fantasy"
7. "Fade to Glory"
8. "Messages"
9. "D.M.X."
10. "Metro Alien"
11. "I Dream"
- Musical Production: Ric deGroot
- Audio Production: Ron Obvious
- Executive Producer: Bob Brooks
- Art Direction & Design: Joan Tankersley
- Illustration: Denise Chapman
- Layout: Lori Cooper
- Source: Ric deGroot, Star Song Records
