= Songs from Bright Avenue =

Studio album by Bob Bennett
- Released: 1991
- Genre: CCM
- Label: Urgent Records
- Producer: Jonathan David Brown

Bob Bennett chronology
Lord of the Past: A Compilation (1989)	Songs from Bright Avenue (1991)	Small Graces (1997)

Songs from Bright Avenue is Bob Bennett's fifth release. The album was made in the shadow of Bennett's divorce from his first wife. Bennett stated, "I was 'foolish' enough to make a record about my divorce. The normal [procedure] in Christian music is that if you go through a divorce, you simply go underground for a year and show up with a new spouse, and no one's the wiser. When Songs From Bright Avenue came out, I realized that this was not going to be the 'Hey-let's-buy-a-big-bag-of-Fritos-and-invite-the-gang-over' type of record. I've had people tell me that it was just too painful to listen to. I say, 'I understand that, but go back and listen and see if you can find some hope there because I certainly tried [to convey that]'."

== Track listing ==
All songs written by Bob Bennett, except where noted.

1. "Here On Bright Avenue" – 4:48
2. "No Such Thing As Divorce" – 4:14
3. "Angels Around Your Bed" – 3:15
4. "The Doing of the Thing" – 5:14
5. "Our Codependent Love" – 5:21
6. "My Secret Heart" – 5:24
7. "Save Me" – 4:09
8. "Unto the Least of These" – 4:39
9. "Hope Like a Stranger" – 3:56
10. "The Place I Am Bound" – 4:26
11. "Singing For My Life" – 3:32
12. "I'm Still Alive Tonight" – 2:23

== Personnel ==
- Bob Bennett – acoustic guitar, vocals, composer
- Breg Jennings (2, 10) – acoustic guitar
- Dan Foster (10) – tin whistle
- Danny O'Lannerghty (5) – electric bass, acoustic bass, rhythm charts
- David Wilcox (3, 9, 11) – background vocals
- Gene Elders (2,10) – fiddle
- Gordon Garrison – sound engineer
- Greg Jennings (1, 4) – electric guitar
- Jimmy Mattingly (8) – fiddle, mandolin
- Jonathan David Brown – producer, recording, mixing
- Kelly Willard (7, 11) – background vocals
- Larry Seyer (1, 3, 6, 7, 9, 11) – electric guitar
- Lisa Glasgow (7, 11) – background vocals
- Mark Hammond (5, 7, 9) – drums, percussion
- Marvin Steinberg (6) – drums, percussion
- Michael Card (8) – background vocals
- Pally O'Malley (5) – electric and acoustic bass
- Paul Glasse (3, 10) – mandolin
- Paul Leim (1, 2, 4, 8, 10, 11) – drums and percussion
- Phil Keaggy (4) – electric guitar, acoustic guitar, background vocals
- Phil Madeira (5) — piano (and for the only keyboard on this record: "Phil Madeira, ladies and gentlemen, on the ivories! Phil...")

== Release history ==
Songs from Bright Avenue was released by Urgent Records in 1991. It was re-released by Signpost Music in 2003.
