= Small Graces =

Studio album by Bob Bennett
- Released: 1997
- Genre: CCM
- Label: Covenant Artists
- Producer: Phil Naish

Bob Bennett chronology
Songs from Bright Avenue (1991)	Small Graces (1997)	The View from Here (2002)

Professional ratings
Review scores
Source	Rating
Cross Rhythms	4/5 stars
The Phantom Tollbooth	4/5 stars

Small Graces is Bob Bennett's sixth release.

Phil Naish recorded the tracks on Small Graces by having Bob come into the studio and record each track solo (only Bob's guitar & his vocals), along with a click track; to obtain Bob's most natural performance. Then the other players were brought in to play around that initial solo track. Small Graces was Phil Naish's mandola debut.

The songs on Small Graces are split between songs that hint at relationships and romance, and those that are directed upward and outward to the body of Christ.

== Track listing ==
All songs written by Bob Bennett, except where noted.

1. "Small Graces" – 3:55
2. "The Only Risk Worth Taking" – 4:13
3. "Lone Star State" – 3:47
4. "Hand Of Kindness" – 4:05
5. "Jesus In Our Time" – 4:45
6. "The Better Part Of Me" – 4:17
7. "Jesus Christ The Apple Tree" – 3:38
8. "The Last One" – 3:08
9. "My Shadow Companion" – 5:19
10. "Altar In The Field" – 2:30

== Personnel ==
- Bob Bennett – acoustic guitar, vocals, composer
- Bonnie Keen – background vocals on "Jesus in our Time" and "Small Graces"
- Cheryl Rogers – background vocals on "Jesus in our Time" and "Small Graces"
- Danny O'Lannerghty – electric bass, acoustic bass
- Ken Lewis – percussion
- Lisa Cochran – background vocals on "Hand of Kindness" and "The Only Risk Worth Taking"
- Phil Naish – mandola, producer
- Ronnie Brookshire (at Mole End) – engineer & mixer
- Scott Brasher – string arrangement for track 2

== Release history ==
Small Graces was released by Covenant Artists in 1997; it was distributed by Myrrh.
