= Twelve Tribes (album) =

Studio album by Richard Souther
- Released: 1990
- Recorded: 1990 at Tina's Place-North Hollywood, CA
- Genre: New Age
- Length: 42:11
- Label: Narada Equinox
- Producer: Eric Persing

Richard Souther chronology
Cross Currents (1989)	Twelve Tribes (1990)	Vision: The Music of Hildegard Von Bingen (1995)

Twelve Tribes is an album by the American musician Richard Souther, released in 1990 on the Narada Equinox label.

== Reception ==
In a contemporaneous review, Jim Aikin described the album as "terrific". He also noted that "Souther's compositional touch is unfaltering", giving specific praise to the "Compañero" track.

Linda Kohanov's review at AllMusic noted a "marked evolution in style" from previous albums, and commented that "Souther's creative use of ethnic rhythms and instruments adds a new level of sophistication to his accessibility".

== Track listing ==
(all songs written by Richard Souther except as noted)

1. City Lights/Western Sky - 4:19
2. Simple Joys - 4:13
3. Trade Winds - 5:15
4. Native Shores - 2:50
5. Compañero (Richard Souther / Eric Persing) - 3:55
6. Go The Distance - 3:31
7. Twelve Tribes - 4:36
8. All in Good Time - 4:54
9. The Summit - 5:21
10. Hands Held Apart - 3:17

== Personnel ==
- Richard Souther - piano, synthesizers, samplers
- Abraham Laboriel - bass
- Efrain Toro - percussion
- Justo Almario - saxophone
- Steve Tavaglione - EWI, violin
- Randy Mitchell - guitar
