= Richard Souther =

American musician

- Birth name: Richard Douglas Trowbridge Souther
- Born: June 25, 1951 (age 73); Los Angeles, CA, United States
- Genres: New-age music · instrumental music · synth-pop · ambient · electronica · contemporary classical
- Occupation: Musician · composer · arranger · keyboardist · pianist
- Instrument: Keyboards · synthesizer · piano
- Years active: 1985–present
- Labels: Meadowlark Records; Narada; Angel Records; Sony Classical; NortherSouth Music
- Website: richardsouther.com

Richard Douglas Trowbridge Souther (Born June 25 1951, Los Angeles, CA, United States, currently living in Las Vegas, NV, United States.) is an American musician, composer, arranger, keyboardist and pianist, who played on several albums of contemporary Christian and chant-based music. He also placed an album in the Top 10 of Billboard's New Age Albums chart.

In the mid to late 1970s, Souther was a member of A Band Called David, which supplied backing music for the vocal group the 2nd Chapter of Acts. As part of that group, Souther played on all three of 2nd Chapter's albums. During this same period, he also appeared on several religious-themed records by Barry McGuire, Phil Keaggy, Annie Herring and Jamie Owens-Collins.

In the mid 1980s, Souther recorded four instrumental albums for the newly-established Meadowlark Records. Two of these—Heirborne (MLR 7004, 1985) and InnerMission (MLR 7012, 1986)—were performed on synthesizers and released under his first and last names. The other two—Songs Unspoken (MLR 7007, 1985) and Second Story (MLR 7016, 1987)—are piano solo albums and were released under his two middle names, Douglas Trowbridge, to distinguish them from the synthesizer albums.

After recording with Meadowlark, Souther signed with Narada Equinox. He released two albums while with Narada—Cross Currents (N-63007, 1989) and Twelve Tribes (CD-3015, 1990). Cross Currents reached No. 9 on Billboard's Top New Age Albums chart.

In 1991, Souther served as producer and arranger on Twila Paris's Sanctuary album (Star Song, SSD 8207, 1991), which won a 1992 Dove Award for the best Praise and Worship Album of the Year. In 1994, he provided the instrumental backing for an album of chants, Vision: The Music Of Hildegard von Bingen (Angel Records, 55246, 1994), which reached the top of Billboard's Classical Crossover chart. Souther released a similar album in 1997, Illumination (Hildegard von Bingen: The Fire of the Spirit) (Sony Classical, SK 62853, 1997), which reached No. 14 on the Classical Crossover chart.

Since 2002, Souther has released various albums on the NortherSouth Music label, none of which have appeared on any Billboard chart. Some of the releases have been credited to Under the Radar, another pseudonym of Souther's.

== Discography ==
- Heirborne (Meadowlark MLR-7004, 1985, LaserLight 15 319, 1990)
- Songs Unspoken (Meadowlark MLR-7007, 1985) (as middle name "Douglas Trowbridge")
- InnerMission (Meadowlark MLR-7012, 1986, LaserLight 15 350, 1991)
- Second Story (Meadowlark MLR-7016, 1987) (as middle name "Douglas Trowbridge")
- Cross Currents (Narada Equinox N-63007, 1989)
- Twelve Tribes (Narada CD-3015, 1990)
- Vision: The Music of Hildegard of Bingen (Angel Records, 1994)
- Illumination: Hildegard Von Bingen - The Fire of the Spirit (Sony Classical, 1997)
- Wonder (NortherSouth Music, 2001)
- A Blip on the Screen (NortherSouth Music, 2002) (as "Under The Radar")
- Interpretations of the Season (NortherSouth Music, 2002)
- Radio Flyer (NortherSouth Music, 2004) (as "Under The Radar")
- Carols, Rhythms & Grooves (NortherSouth Music, 2004)
- Visual Futurist: Music from the Original Motion Picture (NortherSouth Music, 2005)
- Memories of Twilight (NortherSouth Records, 2006)
- Reminisce (NortherSouth Music, 2007)
- A Small Glitch in Time (NortherSouth Music, 2007) (as "Under The Radar")
- Repercussions (NortherSouth Music, 2009)
- Season of Joy (Steiner/Souther, 2010) (with Nyle Steiner)
- The Prayer Closet Vol.1 (NortherSouth Music, 2011)
- The Prayer Closet Vol.2 (NortherSouth Music, 2011)
- The Prayer Closet Vol.3 (NortherSouth Music, 2012)
- Le Jardin (NortherSouth Music, 2012)
- Angels Shepherds Kings (NortherSouth Music, 2013)
- Provenance (NortherSouth Music, 2013)
- Unter der Gnade (NortherSouth Records, 2013)
- State of Grace (NortherSouth Music, 2014)
- Hymns Revisited (NortherSouth Music, 2014)
- The Prayer Closet Vol.5 (NortherSouth Music, 2015)
- The Prayer Closet Vol.6 (NortherSouth Music, 2015)
- The Prayer Closet Vol.7 (NortherSouth Music, 2016)

=== Appears on ===
- Meadowlark Keyboard Sampler 1987 (Meadowlark Records, 1987)
- Sanctuary (Sparrow Records, 1991) (by Twila Paris)
- Acoustic Moods: Meditations (LaserLight 15-997, 1992) (as both "Richard Souther" and "Douglas Trowbridge")
- Razormaid! Spatial Anomalies Vol. 1 (Razormaid Records, 2003) (as "Vision")
