= Six String Prayers =

Studio album by Bob Bennett & John Standefer
- Released: 2007
- Recorded: 2007
- Genre: CCM
- Length: 51:25
- Label: John Standefer & Bob Bennett
- Producer: John Standeder

Six String Prayers is the first collaboration between Bob Bennett and John Standefer. Bob mostly sings, and John mostly plays guitar, but they do each both play or sing on some tracks.

== Track listing ==
1. "Six String Prayers" (John Standefer & Bob Bennett) – 6:04
2. "Wayfaring Stranger" (Traditional) – 6:07
3. "All the Diamonds" (Bruce Cockburn) – 3:33
4. "Defiant Lamb" (Bob Bennett) – 4:47
5. "Sometimes" (Felice Mancini & Henry Mancini) – 1:34
6. "Psalm 5" (Bill Sprouse, Jr.) / "Awaken Me" (Billy Batstone) – 5:42
7. "Change My Heart, O God" (Eddie Espinosa) / "I Love You, Lord" (Laurie Klein) – 6:09
8. "Let All Things Now Living" (Katherine K. Davis / The Ash Grove) – 4:23
9. "Thankful Boys and Girls" (Billy Crockett & Milton Brasher-Cunningham) – 4:07
10. "Abba Father" (Bruce Wickersheim) – 4:45
11. "When I Survey the Wondrous Cross" (Traditional) – 4:08

== Personnel ==
- Bob Bennett – vocals, acoustic guitar on "Defiant Lamb" and "Psalm 5 / Awaken Me"
- John Standefer – acoustic guitar, vocals on "I Love You, Lord", producer, recorder
- Kevin Nettleingham – mixed & mastered
- Jeff Lams – additional vocal recording
