= Medley =

Medley or Medleys may refer to:

== Sports ==
- Medley swimming, races requiring multiple swimming styles
- Medley relay races at track meets

== Music ==
- Medley (music), multiple pieces strung together

== People ==
- Medley (surname), list of people with this name

== Places ==
- Medley, Florida, a town
- Medley, West Virginia, an unincorporated community
- Medley, Alberta

== Other ==
- Medley cloth or Medleys, a woollen fabric
- Medley Hall
- Medley Centre, shopping mall in Irondequoit, New York
- Medley Footbridge, Oxford, England
- Medley Sailing Club, Oxford, England
