= Sanctuary (Twila Paris album) =

Studio album by Twila Paris
- Released: 1991
- Studio: Digital Recorders and Quad Studios (Nashville, Tennessee); Peace In The Valley (Arleta, California).
- Genre: CCM, praise and worship, inspirational
- Length: 47:21
- Label: Star Song
- Producer: Richard Souther

Twila Paris chronology
Cry for the Desert (1990)	Sanctuary (1991)	A Heart That Knows You (1992)

Sanctuary is the ninth studio album by Christian singer-songwriter Twila Paris on Star Song Records. Released in late 1991, Paris' first full-length praise and worship album was produced and arranged by keyboardist Richard Souther. Paris wrote and recorded ten new songs along with instrumental versions of her praise and worship songs "We Bow Down", "We Will Glorify", and "Lamb of God"; she also recorded "He Is Exalted" in Portuguese called "Ele É Exaltado".

Paris won her first Dove Award for Praise and Worship Album of the Year with Sanctuary at the 23rd GMA Dove Awards. Sanctuary is ranked at number 79 from CCM Magazine's 2001 book CCM Presents: The 100 Greatest Albums in Christian Music. The album peaked at number 4 on the Billboard Top Christian Albums chart.

== Track listing ==
All songs written by Twila Paris.

1. "Sanctuary" (instrumental) – 2:57
2. "Let Them Praise" – 3:47
3. "The Joy of the Lord" – 3:43
4. "I Am Ready" – 2:29
5. "We Shall Assemble/In This Sanctuary" – 4:15
6. "We Bow Down" (instrumental) – 3:54
7. "Arise, My Soul, Arise" – 4:24
8. "Hosanna" – 2:28
9. "Come Worship the Lord" – 3:34
10. "Lamb of God" (instrumental) – 2:39
11. "Every Knee Shall Bow" – 4:25
12. "Ele É Exaltado (He Is Exalted)" – 2:57
13. "We Will Glorify" (instrumental) – 1:13
14. "Keeper of the Door" – 4:44

== Personnel ==
- Twila Paris – all vocals (2–5, 7–9, 11, 12, 14)
- Richard Souther – acoustic piano, synthesizers, samplers, electronic percussion
- Eric Persing – Roland JD-800
- Phil Keaggy – acoustic guitars
- Abraham Laboriel – classical guitar, bass
- Efrain Toro – percussion
- Stuart Brotman – cimbalon
- Justin Almario – saxophone, flute
- Steve Tavaglione – EWI controller
- Alasdair Fraser – fiddle
- Suzie Katayama – cello

Production

- Darrell A. Harris – executive producer
- Richard Souther – producer, arrangements, sound design
- Jim Dineen – engineer, mixing, vocal recording, additional instrumental overdubs
- Joe Bellamy – basic track engineer
- Toby Seay – assistant engineer
- John Slattery – assistant engineer
- Doug Sax – mastering at The Mastering Lab (Hollywood, California)
- Scott Frankfurt – sound design
- Eric Persing – sound design
- Jeff Rona – sound design
- Vicki Dvoracek – project coordinator
- Starla Paris – project coordinator
- Cynthia Souther – project coordinator
- Buddy Jackson – art direction
- Toni Thigpen – art direction
- Mark Tucker – photography

== Critical reception ==
Professional ratings
Review scores
Source	Rating
AllMusic	3/5 stars
Cross Rhythms	10/10 stars

Thom Granger of AllMusic wrote that Sanctuary "has set new musical standards in the inspirational field for arrangement and production ideas."

Tony Cummings of Cross Rhythms gave the album a 10 out of 10 saying that "if you take Twila, a singer/songwriter whose ability to craft beautiful songs is matched by her ability to sing them with poignancy and feeling and Richard Souther, a classical/jazz style pianist who is also an exceptionally fine producer. Give them plenty of studio time with an exceptional batch of musicians—Abraham Laboriel (bass/classical guitar), Phil Keaggy (acoustic guitar), Justo Almario (sax/flute)—and encourage them to give their best as they worship the Creator God with their exceptional creativity." Cummings also said that if you combine them all, then you'll have a 5-star album "with a delicate, devotional air which ministers deep into the heart and mind."

== Personnel ==
- Twila Paris – all vocals
- Richard Souther – acoustic piano, synthesizers, samples, electronic percussion
- Alasdair Fraser – fiddle
- Abraham Laboriel – bass, classical guitar
- Phil Keaggy – acoustic guitar
- Justo Almario – flute/saxophone
- Steve Tavaglione – electronic wind instrument
- Suzie Katayama – cello
- Efrain Toro – percussion
- Stuart Brotman – cimbalom
- Eric Persing – Roland JD-800 synthesizer

== Production ==
- Richard Souther – producer, arranger, sound design
- Darrell A. Harris – executive producer
- Jim Dineen – engineer, mixing at Digital Recorders, Nashville, Tennessee, additional vocal and instrumental overdubs recorded at Quad Studios, Nashville, Tennessee
- Toby Seay – assistant engineer
- Joe Bellamy – engineer, basic tracks at Peace in the Valley, Arleta, California
- John Slattery – assistant engineer
- Doug Sax – mastering at The Mastering Lab, Hollywood, California
- Starla Paris – artist project coordinator
- Cynthia Souther – producer project coordinator
- Vicki Dvoracek – Star Song project coordinator
- Scott Frankfurt – sound design
- Jeff Rona – sound design
- Eric Persing – sound design
- Toni Thigpen – art direction
- Buddy Jackson – art direction

== Companion book ==
In 1993, Paris co-authored a companion book about worship with Wheaton College professor Robert E. Webber to go with the album called In This Sanctuary: An Invitation to Worship the Savior, that was published by Star Song Publishing Group.

== Charts ==
Chart (1991)	Peak position
US Top Christian Albums (Billboard)	4

=== Radio singles ===
Year	Single	Peak positions
Year	Single	CCM AC
1992	"The Joy of the Lord"	1
1992	"Arise, My Soul, Arise"	32
1992	"Come, Worship the Lord"	28

== Accolades ==
GMA Dove Awards

Year	Winner	Category
1992	Sanctuary	Praise and Worship Album of the Year
