= First Things First (album) =

Studio album by Bob Bennett
- Released: 1979
- Genre: CCM
- Label: Maranatha! Records
- Producer: Jonathan David Brown

Bob Bennett chronology
First Things First (1979)	Matters Of The Heart (1982)

First Things First is Bob Bennett's first release. It was released about three years after he became a Christian.

== Track listing ==
All songs written by Bob Bennett, except where noted.

1. "Carpenter Gone Bad?" – 3:32
2. "The Night Shift" – 6:34
3. "Whistling In The Dark" – 2:31
4. "The Best" – 3:45
5. "You're Welcome Here" – 3:31
6. "Forgive And Forget" – 2:48
7. "(I Know That) My Redeemer Lives" (text: Samuel Medley; Tune: "Duke Street", John Hatton; adap. Bob Bennett) – 3:16
8. "The Garden Song" – 3:46
9. "I Belong To You" – 3:57
10. "Healings" – 4:49
11. "Spiritual Equation" (CD bonus track) – 2:18

Additional tracks on 2007 release

12. "Spiritual Equation" (acoustic version, re-release CD) – m:ss
13. Track by track commentaries (acoustic version, re-release CD) – m:ss

== Personnel ==
- Bob Bennett – acoustic guitar, vocals, composer
- Jim Fielder – bass guitar
- Ron Tutt – drums
- Alex MacDougall – percussion
- Al Perkins – electric guitar, slide guitar
- Bob Sanders – baritone horn
- Nils Oliver – cello
- Terry Winch – flugelhorn
- Darrel Gardner – flugelhorn
- Bill Alsup – French horn
- Ron Loofbourrow – French horn
- Val Johnson – trombone
- Phil Ayling – woodwinds
- John Phillips – woodwinds
- Jonathan David Brown – producer, recording, mixing
- James Gabriel – horn/woodwind arrangement on Track 7 ("My Redeemer Lives")

== Release history ==
First Things First was originally released on LP and cassette in 1979. In the early 1990s it was released on CD; where that release contained an additional track, "Spiritual Equation". After being out of print for many years, in 2007 Bob Bennett arranged for a limited twenty-fifth anniversary edition; in addition to the original "bonus track", the 2007 release also contains an acoustic version of "Spiritual Equation" and newly recorded song by song commentaries.
