= Christmastide (album) =

Studio album by Bob Bennett
- Released: 2009
- Recorded: Whitewater Productions, Surrey, Canada
- Genre: CCM
- Length: 45:10
- Label: Signpost
- Producer: Roy Salmond

Bob Bennett chronology
My Heart Across the Ocean (2002)	Christmastide (2009)	Joy Deep as Sorrow (2012)

Christmastide is Bob Bennett's eighth album; his second with the Signpost Music label. In this release, Bob captures many of Western Civilization's love/hate relationship with the Christmas season.

== Track listing ==
All songs written by Bob Bennett, except where noted as "(words / music)".

1. "God with Us" – 4:05
2. "Brightest and Best" (Reginald Heber / James P. Harding) – 4:07
3. "Come Thou Not Expected Bossa" (Traditional) – 5:48
4. "It May Not Have Been December" – 3:41
5. "Jesus Christ the Apple Tree" (Anonymous / Elizabeth Poston) – 5:36
6. "The First Noel" (Traditional) – 1:13
7. "Christmas for Cynics" – 3:12
8. "Both Things" – 3:25
9. "Tomorrow Shall Be My Dancing Day" (Traditional / John Gardner) – 2:09
10. "December MIA" – 4:12
11. "O Come All Ye Faithful" (Traditional) – 1:24
12. "I Saw Three Ships" (Traditional - adaptation/arrangement: Bennett) – 2:49
13. "Carol of the Moon and Stars" – 3:15

== Personnel ==
- Bob Bennett – acoustic guitar, electric guitar, vocals, composer
- Roy Salmond – producer, recording, electric guitars, keyboards, percussion (including Egg Cup), Piano, Ukulele, Basses (except for John's three tunes)
- Randall Stoll – drums, percussion (6)
- Brian Thiessen – electric guitar (3)
- Carolyn Arends – background vocals (1)
- Joel Stobbe – cello (9, 13)
- John Patitucci – bass (2, 3, 7)
- Mike Janzen – rhodes (3, 7)
- Larry Nickel – arranged choral vocals (6) and conductor (6, 9)
- Fabiana Katz – choral vocals (6, 9)
- Jennifer McLaren – choral vocals (6, 9)
- John Nickel – choral vocals (6, 9)
- Karen Mang – choral vocals (6, 9)
- Larry Nickel – choral vocals (6, 9)
- Ray Harris – choral vocals (6, 9)

== Release history ==
Christmastide was self-released by the artist in 2009. It is distributed in Canada by Signpost Music.

== Reviews ==
Christianity Today gave the album 4 stars (out of 5) in their November 2009 review; concluding that "Christmastide achieved the twin "Classic" Christmas recording goals of both making light of the season's chaos while ever so poignantly reminding us why we bother to celebrate."
