= Cross Currents (Richard Souther album) =

Studio album by Richard Souther
- Released: 1989
- Recorded: 1989 at Peace In The Valley Recording-Arleta, CA
- Genre: New Age
- Length: 40:43
- Label: Narada Equinox
- Producer: Richard Souther

Richard Souther chronology
Innermission (1986)	Cross Currents (1989)	Twelve Tribes (1990)

Cross Currents is an album by the American musician Richard Souther, released in 1989 for the Narada label. The album reached No. 9 on the Billboard New Age Albums chart.

== Track listing ==
(all songs written by Richard Souther except as noted))

1. Safe Harbor - 5:30
2. Cross Currents - 4:27
3. The Long Riders - 3:30
4. Banana Shakes - 4:56
5. Mary's Question (Richard Souther / Justo Almario) - 1:55
6. High Tide - 3:45
7. Just Dreamin' - 5:10
8. Between The Lines - 3:47
9. The Last Roundup - 2:48
10. All The Way Home - 4:55

== Personnel ==
- Richard Souther - keyboards, synthesizers, electronic percussion
- Justo Almario - saxophone
- Kirk Whalum - saxophone
- Abraham Laboriel - bass
- Dennis Holt - percussion
- Alex Acuna - percussion
- Randy Mitchell - guitar
- Armen Ksajikian - cello

== Charts ==
Chart (1989)	Peak position
Billboard New Age Albums	9
