= Bedtime Prayers: Lullabies and Peaceful Worship =

Studio album by Twila Paris
- Released: March 27, 2001
- Studio: The Bennett House and Dark House Recording (Franklin, Tennessee); Neverland Studios, DePasquale Studio, Kegworth Studio and The Mission (Nashville, Tennessee)
- Genre: CCM, Children's music, inspirational
- Length: 43:53
- Label: Sparrow/EMI
- Producer: John Hartley; Derri Daugherty

Twila Paris chronology
True North (1999)	Bedtime Prayers: Lullabies and Peaceful Worship (2001)	Greatest Hits: Time & Again (2001)

Bedtime Prayers: Lullabies and Peaceful Worship is the fourteenth studio album and children's music album by Christian singer-songwriter Twila Paris, released on March 27, 2001 by Sparrow Records. Bedtime Prayers consists of original lullabies written by Paris, with the exception of the William O. Cushing hymn "Jewels." The album was perfectly timed because Paris and her husband Jack Wright were expecting their first child. A month after the album's release, Paris gave birth to their first born son named Jack Paris Wright. It was a name Paris had picked out for 15 years. The album is produced by John Hartley of the U.K. Christian music duo Phil and John, with additional production by Derald Daugherty, lead singer of the alternative Christian rock group The Choir. Paris won a Dove Award for Children's Music Album of the Year for Bedtime Prayers at the 33rd GMA Dove Awards in 2002. The album reached number one on the Billboard Top Kid Albums chart.

== Track listing ==
All songs written by Twila Paris, except where noted.

1. "God Is All Around Us" - 3:51
2. "Jewels" (William O. Cushing) - 3:09
3. "My Delight" - 3:02
4. "Perfect Peace" - 3:22
5. "My Best Friend" - 3:14
6. "Your Whole Life Long" - 4:31
7. "His Beloved" - 2:52
8. "More Than I Can Say" - 4:28
9. "There Is Only One" - 4:12
10. "Bedtime Prayer" - 3:38
11. "See You Tomorrow" - 3:25
12. "Blessing" - 3:57

== Critical reception ==
Professional ratings
Review scores
Source	Rating
AllMusic	3/5 stars
Cross Rhythms	8/10 stars

Ashleigh Kittle of AllMusic said of Bedtime Prayers that "Paris has specifically geared the album toward new mothers and young children. Her aim being to assist parents in teaching their children Biblically based foundational truths that can be carried with them the rest of their lives. The album is beautifully orchestrated, featuring Paris' trademark piano melodies paired with moderate tempos and the vocal vulnerability present on all she sings. Musically, it best reflects a blending of inspirational praise and worship with the gentle, soothing style associated with lullabies."

Tony Cummings of Cross Rhythms recommended Bedtime Prayers saying "If you're looking for a perfect gift for a new mum (sorry, mom) here's a delicate worshipful music that features excellent musicianship and prayers to the Father as it woos the little darling asleep."

== Personnel ==
- Twila Paris – vocals
- Adam DePasquale – keyboards, programming, tenor recorder
- Tom Howard – keyboards, string orchestration arrangements and conductor
- Jamie Kenney – keyboards, programming
- Phil Madeira – Hammond B3 organ
- John Mock – harmonium, penny whistle, low whistle
- John Mark Painter – accordion, brass, penny whistle
- Gary Burnette – guitars
- Jared DePasquale – guitars
- Phil Keaggy – guitars
- Chris Rodriguez – guitars, backing vocals
- Al Perkins – pedal steel guitar
- Chris Donohue – bass
- Danny O'Lannerghty – bass
- Eric Darken – percussion
- Ken Lewis – percussion
- Bob Mason – cello
- Kristin Wilkinson – viola
- Carl Gorodetzky – violin
- Pam Sixfin – violin
- Chris Eaton – backing vocals
- Molly Felder – backing vocals
- Felicia Sorenson – backing vocals

== Production ==
- Lynn Nichols – executive producer
- John Hartley – producer
- Derri Daugherty – additional production, recording
- Jim Dineen – recording
- Jordan Richter – recording
- Brian Boyd – recording assistant
- David Streit – recording assistant
- Brian Tankersley – mixing at GTB Studio (Franklin, Tennessee)
- Sam Hewitt – mix assistant
- Hank Williams – mastering at MasterMix (Nashville, Tennessee)
- Christiév Carothers – creative director
- Wayne Brezinka – art direction
- Jan Cook – art direction
- Katherine Stratton – design
- Russ Harrington – photography
- Joy Patterson – prop stylist
- Jennifer Kemp – stylist
- Mary Beth Felts – hair, make-up
- Proper Management – management

== Companion book ==
Paris has also released a companion book called Bedtime Prayers and Lullabies published by Harvest House Publishers. Accompanied with illustration paintings by Kathryn Andrews Fincher, the book gives new parents simple prayers and soothing lullabies to newborn babies and toddlers.

== Charts ==
Chart (2001)	Peak position
US Top Kid Albums (Billboard)	1

== Accolades ==
GMA Dove Awards

Year	Winner	Category
2002	Bedtime Prayers: Lullabies and Peaceful Worship	Children's Music Album of the Year
