= The View from Here (album) =

The View From Here

Studio album by Bob Bennett
- Released: 2002
- Recorded: Signpost Studios, Winnipeg, Manitoba, Canada
- Genre: CCM
- Length: 22:01
- Label: Signpost Music
- Producer: Dave Zeglinski & Steve Bell

Bob Bennett chronology
| Small Graces (1991) | The View From Here (2002) | My Heart Across the Ocean (2002) |

The View From Here is American singer Bob Bennett's seventh album, and is the third release in Signpost Music's "Livingroom Series" releases. Bob dedicated this release to his mother, Betty Jane Bennett. As originally envisioned, the CD's release was to have included a CD booklet insert with notes from Bob about each song; however, cost constraints prevented this from occurring.

== Track listing ==
All songs written by Bob Bennett, except where noted.

1. "The View From Here" (Bob Bennett & Tom Prasada-Rao) – 3:43
2. "Defiant Lamb" – 4:46
3. "A Life That Is Not My Own" – 2:33
4. "Still Rolls The Stone Prelude" – 1:51
5. "Still Rolls The Stone" – 3:35
6. "The Kings Of Summer Street" (Bob Bennett & Don Henry) – 3:53
7. "The Communion Rail" – 1:58
8. "Lord Of The Past" – 4:39
9. "We Were The Kings" – 5:39
10. "Heart Of Hearts" (Mark Heard) – 3:38
11. "Man Of The Tombs" – 5:59
12. "All Hail The Power Of Jesus' Name" (words: Edward Perronet; music: Oliver Holden; arrangement: Bob Bennett) – 3:47

== Personnel ==
- Bob Bennett – acoustic guitar, vocals, composer
- Steve Bell – producer, background vocals, mandolin
- Dave Zeglinski – producer, recording, mixing, mastering
- Vince Gatti – assistant engineer
- Gilles Fournier – acoustic bass
- Greg Lowe – cello arrangements
- Carolyn Nagelberg – cello
- Ron Holldorson – dobro
- Daniel Roy – percussion

== Release history ==
The View From Here was released by Signpost Music in 2002 and is distributed in Canada by Signpost Music and in the USA by Grassroots Music.
