= Bob Bennett (singer) =

American singer-songwriter

- Bennett in 2007

Background information
- Born: March 21, 1955 (age 71); Downey, California, U.S.
- Genre: CCM
- Occupations: Singer, songwriter, composer
- Instruments: Vocals, guitar
- Years active: 1979–present
- Labels: Maranatha! Music, Priority Star Song, Urgent, Covenant Artists, Signpost
- Website: bob-bennett.com

Bob Bennett (born March 21, 1955) is an American contemporary Christian music singer, guitarist and songwriter from Downey, California. Bennett is known for his distinctive tenor voice, Christian lyrics and folk-inspired guitar playing.

== Career ==
Bennett was born in Downey, California. He picked up his first guitar at age nine and formed a rock 'n' roll band in high school. In the late seventies he converted to Christianity and his songwriting began to reflect his newfound faith.

His career was launched with the release of his 1979 folk-style debut recording First Things First. Three years later, Matters of the Heart, a recording CCM Magazine selected as 1982's "Album of the Year", and later ranked it 25th on its list of contemporary Christian albums of all time. Soon after the release of his next recording, Non-Fiction, he served as opening act on Amy Grant's Unguarded tour. Lord of the Past: A Compilation followed, which peaked at 30th position on Billboard magazine's Top Contemporary Christian chart in 1990. The album's title song reached number one on the Christian radio charts in early 1990. This was followed by Bennett's second number one song: "Yours Alone".

Later in 1990 Bennett joined Michael Card on his The Way of Wisdom tour, performing in front of sold-out audiences across the country. Bennett credits his tour with Michael Card as being the only reason he had a career in 1990 and 1991. Songs from Bright Avenue was released in 1991, a collection of songs he wrote while struggling with the dissolution of his marriage. The project, Jesus Music Again, a collaboration with Bill Batstone and Alex MacDougall, was released in 2011.

Bennett plays a Kevin Ryan guitar, and is currently signed with Signpost Communications.

== Discography ==
=== Solo releases ===
- First Things First (Maranatha! Music, 1979) (04/2007: Limited Edition Twenty-Fifth Anniversary Release)
- Matters of the Heart (CBS/Priority, 1982) (May 22, 2007: Re-released on iTunes and in Mp3 format on Amazon)
- Non-Fiction (Star Song, 1985) (May 22, 2007: Re-released on iTunes and in Mp3 format on Amazon)
- Lord of the Past: A Compilation (Urgent Records, 1989) (Out-of-Print)
- Songs from Bright Avenue (Urgent Records, 1991; Re-release by Signpost Music, 2003)
- Small Graces (Covenant Artists, 1997)
- The View from Here (Signpost Music, 2002)
- "My Heart Across the Ocean" (single, 2002)
- Christmastide (Signpost Music, 2009)
- Joy Deep as Sorrow (self-released, 2012)
- Live at Judson University (self-released, 2016)
- Everlasting Day (self-released, 2025)

=== Songs in other projects ===
- "Place I Am Bound" — track 2 on Fast Folk FF708 Vol. 9 No. November 8, 1993, Los Angeles Revisited (still available from Smithsonian Folkways Recordings)
- "Beautiful, Scandalous Night" — track 3 on At the Foot of the Cross: Vol. 1: Clouds, Rain, Fire
- "Holy God, We Praise Thy Name", "Born to Die", "In the Bleak Midwinter" — tracks on Christmas in Our Time (Urgent!, 2004)
- "Strange Joy" — track 3 on Music of Proclaim!, volume 3: There Is a Way
- "Hand of Kindness", "Unto the Least of These", "Our Codependent Love", and "Defiant Lamb" — tracks 3, 5, 8 and 11, respectively, on Return of the Killer B's (Live from Memphis)

=== Collaborations and other credits ===
- background vocals on Billy Crockett's albums: Any Starlight Night (Urgent Records, 1994) & Watermarks (Walking Angel Records, 1998)
- Six String Prayers, John Standefer (guitar) & Bob Bennett (vocals) (2007)
- co-wrote "Broken Beauty" with Jon Buller on his album: Light Up The Sky (Signpost, 2009)
- Songs for Israel with Phil Keaggy, Randy Stonehill, and Buck Storm (Candlelight Records 2010)
- Jesus Music Again, Bill Batstone (guitars, bass, vocals), Bob Bennett (guitars, vocals), Alex MacDougall (percussion, drums) (2011, review)

== Awards and recognition ==
CCM Magazine named Matters of the Heart "Album of the Year - 1982", and among the Top 25 CCM Albums of all time. The magazine also ranked Lord of the Past among the top 100 CCM Albums of all time.
