= Samuel Medley (painter) =

English painter (1769–1857)

Samuel Medley (1769–1857) was an English portrait painter and one of the founders of University College, London. His works include a large group representing the Medical Society of London. Many prints were engraved and distributed after his paintings.

== Life ==
Samuel Medley, Jr. was born on 22 March 1769. He was son of the Baptist minister Samuel Medley.

Taking up painting as his profession, he exhibited for the first time at the Royal Academy, in 1792 sending The Last Supper. In 1805, however, he went on the Stock Exchange, for health reasons, where he made a comfortable income, continuing to paint in his leisure hours.

Medley was a member of a large Baptist community in London, under Francis Augustus Cox. With Cox, Henry Brougham, and some leading Dissenters, he was associated in founding University College, London, in 1826.

Later in life, Medley lived at Chatham, where he died on 10 August 1857, and was buried.

== Works ==
Medley painted religious and historical subjects, but turned mainly to portraits. A large group of his represents the Medical Society of London; it was engraved by Cooper Branwhite.

== Family ==
Medley married, first, in 1792 Susannah, daughter of George Bowley of Bishopsgate Street, London; second, in 1818, Elizabeth, daughter of John Smallshaw of Liverpool. By his first wife he had three sons, William, Guy, and George, and three daughters, of whom the eldest, Susannah, married Henry Thompson, and was mother of Sir Henry Thompson the surgeon.
