= Twila Paris =

American songwriter and singer

- Born: December 28, 1958 (age 67); Fort Worth, Texas, U.S.
- Genre: Contemporary Christian
- Occupation: Singer
- Instruments: Voice, piano
- Years active: 1980–present
- Labels: Milk and Honey, Star Song, Benson, Sparrow, Integrity Music, Mountain Spring

Twila Paris (born December 28, 1958) is an American contemporary Christian music singer, songwriter, author, and pianist. Since 1980, Paris has released 28 albums, amassed 33 number one Christian Radio singles, and was named the Gospel Music Association Female Vocalist of the Year three years in a row. Many of her earlier songs such as "He Is Exalted", "We Will Glorify", "Lamb of God", and "We Bow Down", are found in church hymnals or otherwise sung in church settings. She was inducted into the Gospel Music Association Hall of Fame in May 2015.

== Career ==
As a child she released her first album, Little Twila Paris, in 1965. The album included songs drawn from among those she sang with her family in their evangelistic outreaches.

Paris released her first full-length album, Knowin' You're Around, in 1980, and along the way she has written books, recorded children's music, and created worship songs.

In the 1980s and 1990s, Paris released mainly contemporary Christian pop songs. But in recent years, she has focused on recording new versions of some of her worship standards and writing new praise and worship music. Her 2005 album He Is Exalted: Live Worship collects a number of favorite songs commonly used in praise and worship of Paris's and presents them in a more typical style of live worship music. After her song "He Is Exalted" was used in churches in Brazil, Paris re-recorded it in the Portuguese translation they were using. This version appears on her 1992 album Sanctuary. Sanctuary won the GMA Praise & Worship Album of the Year, and in 1995, her song "God Is In Control" won a GMA Song of the Year award. She has won five GMA Dove Awards and three American Songwriter Awards.

Although associated for much of her career with Star Song Communications, parent company EMI switched her to Sparrow Records in 1996, before her contract ended after 2003. In 2005, she switched to the praise and worship label Integrity Music for He Is Exalted: Live Worship.

Paris released Small Sacrifice on December 26, 2007, which was available only through her Web site and at LifeWay Christian Stores. This album married the two parts of her career by including both inspirational pop/adult contemporary songs and original praise and worship compositions. Her first radio single from Small Sacrifice was "Live to Praise". Small Sacrifice was released for wider distribution by Koch Records on February 24, 2009.

In 2012, Paris released a patriotic-themed project called God Shed His Grace: Songs of Truth and Freedom that includes two new cuts ("God of Our Fathers" and "America the Beautiful") and ten cuts that Paris hand-picked from other projects. The purpose of the project is to inspire patriots with themes of God's protection and love, even in difficult times.

From 2011 to 2012, Paris was part of the Christian Classics Tour, joining artists Steve Green, Wayne Watson, Larnelle Harris and Michael Card.

== Legacy ==
Paris has created a body of work in a modern hymn style. Her compositions are included in hymnals used by several Christian denominations and various Charismatic churches. Kelly Willard and Jamie Owens-Collins sang background vocals for her on her Keepin' My Eyes On You album and sang as a trio on the hymn "Leaning on the Everlasting Arms" on The Warrior Is a Child.

== Personal life ==
Twila Paris is the daughter of Oren Paris II, the son of travelling late 19th and early 20th century street preachers and his wife Rachel Inez Paris. In the late 1970s, Oren Paris II founded a Youth with a Mission (YWAM) base in Elm Springs, Arkansas. Oren II is the cousin of YWAM founder, Loren Cunningham.

After Oren II's passing, his son Oren III, claimed his father as the founder and Chancellor of Ecclesia College in Springdale, Arkansas, which operates on the former physical grounds of the Elm Springs YWAM base. In 2017, Twila Paris defended her brother Oren III after he was indicted for participating in a kickback scheme as Ecclesia's president, stating, "Those who know him [Oren III] well know that he is a man of deep integrity with a long established record of exemplary character. It is very clear that his highest aim is always to please God." In September 2018, Oren III received a three-year prison sentence for the kickback scheme after pleading guilty.

Twila Paris married her manager Jack Wright in 1985. Paris indicated in an interview that Wright had contracted the Epstein–Barr virus (EBV) causing him chronic fatigue; however in 2000, doctors discovered he had a form of hepatitis for which he was treated.

Paris and Wright have a son. His name is Jack Paris Wright.

== Politics ==
Paris endorsed Ted Cruz in the 2016 Republican presidential primary, saying that "he is a leader we have been praying for."

== Discography ==
=== Albums ===
- 1980: Knowin' You're Around
- 1982: Keepin' My Eyes On You
- 1984: The Warrior Is a Child
- 1985: Kingdom Seekers
- 1987: Same Girl
- 1988: For Every Heart
- 1989: It's the Thought...
- 1990: Cry for the Desert
- 1991: Sanctuary
- 1992: A Heart That Knows You
- 1993: Beyond a Dream
- 1995: The Time Is Now
- 1996: Where I Stand
- 1996: The Early Years
- 1998: Perennial: Songs for the Seasons of Life
- 1999: True North
- 2000: Signature Songs
- 2001: Bedtime Prayers: Lullabies and Peaceful Worship
- 2001: Greatest Hits
- 2003: House of Worship
- 2003: 8 Great Hits
- 2005: He Is Exalted
- 2005: Simply Twila Paris
- 2006: The Ultimate Collection
- 2008: Greatest Hits
- 2009: Small Sacrifice
- 2014: 20th Century Masters - The Millennium Collection
- 2014: Hymns

==== Hit singles ====
===== Top-ten singles (Adult Contemporary & Inspo Christian Charts) =====
- No. 1 "The Warrior is a Child" (1984-11-02)
- No. 2 "Do I Trust You" (1984-12-26)
- No. 1 "Runner" (1986-04-01)
- No. 2 "Lamb of God" (1986-06-25)
- No. 1 "He is Exalted" (1986-10-20)
- No. 1 "Prince of Peace" (1987-09-07)
- No. 1 "Holy is the Lord" (1987-11-16)
- No. 1 "Bonded Together" (1988-03-21)
- No. 1 "Send Me" (1988-06-13)
- No. 1 "Every Heart That is Breaking" (1988-10-31)
- No. 1 "True Friend" (1989-02-06)
- No. 1 "Never Ending Love" (1989-05-15)
- No. 1 "Sweet Victory" (1989-09-04)
- No. 1 "I See You Standing" (1990-09-17)
- No. 6 "How Beautiful" (1991-01-07)
- No. 7 "Cry For the Desert" (1991-03-18)
- No. 1 "Nothing But Love" (1991-07-22)
- No. 7 "Undivided Heart" (1991-10-14)
- No. 1 "The Joy of the Lord" (1992-02-10)
- No. 1 "I'm Still Here" (with Bruce Carroll) (1992-05-25)
- No. 1 "Destiny" (1993-01-18)
- No. 5 "A Heart That Knows You" (1993-04-12)
- No. 1 "God is in Control" (1994-02-21)
- No. 1 "Neither Will I" (1994-06-13)
- No. 1 "Watch and Pray" (1994-09-19)
- No. 4 "Seventy Years Ago" (1995-01-23)
- No. 1 "The Time is Now" (1995-04-24)
- No. 1 "Love's Been Following You" (1996–03)
- No. 1 "Faithful Friend" (with Steven Curtis Chapman) (1996-05-13)
- No. 1 "(I Am) Not Afraid Anymore" (1996-08-26)
- No. 1 "What Did He Die For" (1997–05)
- No. 1 "Run to You" (1999-10-25)
- No. 1 "I Choose Grace" (1999-10-25)
- No. 1 "True North" (2000–03)
- No. 1 "Wisdom" (2000–07)
- No. 1 "Delight My Heart" (2000–12)
- No. 3 "My Delight" (2001–04)
- No. 1 "Days of Elijah" (2005–08)
- No. 3 "Live to Praise" (2007–11)

== GMA Dove Awards ==
- 1992: Praise and Worship Album of the Year, Sanctuary
- 1993: Female Vocalist of the Year
- 1994: Female Vocalist of the Year
- 1995: Female Vocalist of the Year
- 1995: Song of the Year, "God is in Control"
- 1996: Special Event Album of the Year – My Utmost For His Highest (various artists) (shared)
- 1997: Special Event Album of the Year – Tribute: The Songs of Andraé Crouch (various artists) (shared)
- 1998: Special Event Album of the Year – God With Us: A Celebration of Christmas Carols (various artists) (shared)
- 1999: Long Form Music Video of the Year – My Utmost for His Highest (various artists) (shared)
- 2002: Children's Music Album of the Year – Bedtime Prayers, Lullabies and Peaceful Worship

== Books ==
- Making a Christmas Memory (1990) (With Jeanie Price)
- In This Sanctuary: An Invitation to Worship the Savior (1992) (co-authored with Dr. Robert Webber)
- Celebrate the Gift of Jesus Every Day (1993, 1994)
- Perennial: Meditations for the Seasons of Life (1998)
- Bedtime Prayers and Lullabies (2001)
