= Cry for the Desert =

Studio album by Twila Paris
- Released: 1990
- Studio: The Bennett House and The Castle (Franklin, Tennessee); Digital Recorders, GroundStar Laboratories, OmniSound Studios, Quad Studios and Sixteenth Avenue Sound (Nashville, Tennessee)
- Genre: CCM, Christian pop, praise and worship
- Length: 52:01
- Label: Star Song
- Producer: Brown Bannister

Twila Paris chronology
It's the Thought... (1989)	Cry for the Desert (1990)	Sanctuary (1991)

Professional ratings
Review scores
Source	Rating
AllMusic	3/5 stars

Cry for the Desert is the eighth studio album by Christian singer-songwriter Twila Paris, released in 1990 by Star Song Records. The album is Paris' first time working with producer Brown Bannister, who is best known for producing Christian pop superstar Amy Grant's albums and recently produced the Christian rock group White Heart's 1989 album Freedom and features the band's rhythm section of guitarist Gordon Kennedy, bassist Tommy Sims and drummer Chris McHugh. Producer Bannister updated Paris' sound on Cry for the Desert to sound more contemporary pop while still incorporating her praise and worship music. Paris' song "How Beautiful" is now considered a modern day hymn and is used during Easter services during communion. The song is ranked in the Top 20 from CCM Magazine's 2006 book The 100 Greatest Songs in Christian Music. Paris was nominated in two categories at the 22nd GMA Dove Awards for Female Vocalist of the Year and Pop/Contemporary Album of the Year. Cry for the Desert climbed up to number two on the Billboard Top Christian Albums chart.

== Track listing ==
All songs written by Twila Paris.

1. "Tributary" (instrumental) - 2:48
2. "Nothing But Love" - 5:36
3. "Cry for the Desert" - 5:09
4. "He Is a Song" - 4:07
5. "Undivided Heart" - 5:03
6. "How Beautiful" - 4:29
7. "I Will Wait" - 4:14
8. "I See You Standing" - 3:57
9. "This Thorn" - 4:47
10. "Celebration/Kingdom of God" - 5:19
11. "Fix Your Eyes" - 5:02

== Personnel ==
- Twila Paris – lead vocals (2–11), backing vocals (2, 8), acoustic piano (11)
- Shane Keister – keyboards (1, 2, 5, 6, 8), acoustic piano (4, 9)
- Byron House – Fairlight (1, 7), celesta (6)
- Carl Marsh – Fairlight (1, 4), keyboards (8)
- Robbie Buchanan – keyboards (2, 3, 5, 8)
- Blair Masters – Emulator III (2, 5), programming (10)
- Charlie Peacock – keyboards (3, 10, 11), rhythm track arrangements (3, 10), programming (10, 11), guest vocals (11)
- Gordon Kennedy – guitars (1–3, 5, 8)
- Jerry McPherson – guitar effect (1), guitars (2–5, 8, 11)
- Tom Hemby – guitar (9)
- Tommy Sims – bass guitar (1–5, 8)
- Chris McHugh – drums (1–5, 8, 10, 11), percussion (11)
- Chris Eaton – backing vocals (2, 3, 5, 8, 10), keyboards (7), programming (7)
- Chris Rodriguez – backing vocals (5, 8)
- Brown Bannister – guest vocals (11)

Nashville String Machine

- Ronn Huff – string and woodwind arrangements
- Carl Gorodetzky – string contractor
- Jim Laseen – bassoon
- Lee Levine – clarinet
- Ann Richards – flute
- Bobby Taylor – oboe
- Tom McAninch – horn

Children's choir on "Cry for the Desert"

- Abigail Watkins
- Alicia Keaggy
- Aubree Harris
- Benjamin Bannister
- Chelsea Harris
- Ellie Bannister
- Eric Volz
- Michelle McDowell
- Sam Ashworth

== Production ==
- Darrell A. Harris – executive producer
- Brown Bannister – producer, overdub recording
- Jeff Balding – track recording, mixing
- Bill Deaton – additional overdub recording
- Brent King – orchestra recording
- Steve Bishir – track recording assistant, overdub assistant
- Byron House – overdub assistant
- Carry Summers – track recording assistant
- Image Recording Studios (Los Angeles, California) – mixing location
- Doug Sax – mastering at The Mastering Lab (Hollywood, California)
- Richard Headen – production coordinator
- Toni Thigpen – art direction
- Marlene Cohen – design
- Peter Darley Miller – photography

== Charts ==
Chart (1990)	Peak position
US Top Christian Albums (Billboard)	2

=== Radio singles ===
Year	Single	Peak positions	
Year	Single	CCM AC	CCM CHR
1990	"I See You Standing"	1	8
1990	"How Beautiful"	6	—
1991	"Cry for the Desert"	7	9
1991	"Nothing But Love"	1	8
1991	"Undivided Heart"	7	12
