= Samuel Medley (minister) =

English Baptist minister and hymn-writer

Samuel Medley (1738–1799) was an English Baptist minister and hymn-writer.

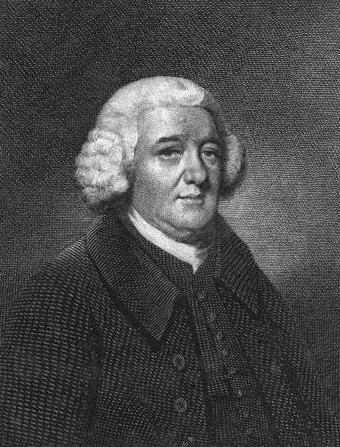
Samuel Medley

== Life ==
Samuel Medley was born on 23 June 1738 in Cheshunt, Hertfordshire. He was the second son of Guy Medley (died 25 October 1760), who had a school in Cheshunt. Guy Medley was married the youngest daughter of William Tonge, schoolmaster at Enfield; and was a close friend of James Hervey. He was educated by Tonge, his maternal grandfather, and at 14 was apprenticed to an oilman in the city of London. In 1755, however, he obtained his freedom on entering the Royal Navy, from which he was discharged after being wounded in the Battle of Lagos on 18 August 1759.

From 1762 to 1766, Medley kept a successful school in King Street, Soho, London, and became acquainted with Andrew Gifford. He joined Gifford's Particular Baptist church in Eagle Street, Holborn, in December 1760, and Gifford then led him to enter the Baptist ministry. He began preaching on 29 August 1766, and on 6 June 1767 he accepted a call to a congregation at Watford, Hertfordshire, which had been without a minister since 1763. Here he was ordained on 13 July 1768. On 11 November 1771 he was invited to the Baptist church in Byrom Street, Liverpool, and began his ministry there on 15 April 1772.

Medley's Liverpool meeting-house was enlarged in 1773, and in 1789 a new building was erected for him in the same street. His old meeting-house was consecrated in 1792 as St. Stephen's Church. Medley worked among the seamen of the port of Liverpool; his methods of preaching were disliked by Gilbert Wakefield; but his daughter collected up some of his witticisms, and Robert Halley ranked him as a great preacher. Adult baptism was not an essential for membership in his church, which became practically Congregational.

Medley visited London yearly, preaching at the Surrey Chapel, Southwark and Whitefield's Tabernacle, Tottenham Court Road. After a painful illness he died on 17 July 1799.

== Works ==
Two of Medley's sermons are printed with his Memoirs (1800), edited by his son Samuel; one was translated into Welsh.

Medley wrote 230 hymns. His hymns, originally printed on single sheets, and in the Gospel Magazine and other publications, were collected in:

- Hymns, Bradford, 1785.
- Hymns on Select Portions of Scripture, Bristol, 1785 (this is called 2nd edit., but is a smaller and variant collection; it was enlarged 1787).
- Hymns, 1794.
- The Public Worship and Private Devotion … Assisted … in Verse, 1800.

Robert Halley called Medley a "small poet", but William Rawson Stevenson wrote that 20 of his hymns had a vogue.

Medley's daughter Sarah published a volume of Original and Miscellaneous Poems, Liverpool, 1807, and other poems in Liverpool magazines; also a Memoir, 1833, of her father, with appended hymns, ascribed to him; many were altered, and some of them were by Thomas Kelly (1769–1855).

== Family ==
Medley married (17 April 1762) Mary, daughter of William Gill, a hosier of Nottingham. Their son was the painter Samuel Medley, whose grandson was the surgeon Sir Henry Thompson, 1st Baronet.

== Notes ==
Attribution

This article incorporates text from a publication now in the public domain: Lee, Sidney, ed. (1894). "Medley, Samuel (1738-1799)". Dictionary of National Biography. Vol. 37. London: Smith, Elder & Co.
