= Jamie Owens-Collins =

American composer, singer and songwriter

Jamie Owens-Collins (born September 1955), born Jamie Sue Owens, is an American Contemporary Christian music composer, singer and songwriter.

She is the child of Jimmy and Carol Owens and was born and raised in Oakland, California, where her parents wrote and staged Christian musicals. As a teenager she performed on several of her parents' albums, which made her a star in the Jesus music movement and led to her releasing her first album, titled Laughter in Your Soul, in 1973. This album was the best-selling Christian music album in Britain in 1975. A second release, Growing Pains, followed in 1975, and in 1976 she married Christian music executive Dan Collins, becoming Jamie Owens-Collins. In 1976 she co-wrote a musical, Firewind, with The Talbot Brothers, and released another album in 1978 titled Love Eyes for Light Records, followed by Straight Ahead for Sparrow Records in 1980. Owens-Collins and her producer-husband performed with the Maranatha Praise Band from 1989-1995, offering musical backing to evangelists such as Franklin Graham and Greg Laurie. Jamie has written commentary for three Bible translations and in 2017 produced and wrote seven episodes on the life of Jesus for an audio drama series from the television mini-series called The Bible Series developed by Roma Downey and Mark Burnett.

== Discography ==
- Laughter in Your Soul (Light Records, 1973)
- Growing Pains (Light, 1975)
- Love Eyes (Light Records, 1978)
- Straight Ahead (Sparrow, 1980)
- A Time For Courage (Live Oak Records, 1985)
- The Gift of Christmas (Live Oak, 1987)
- Seasons (Newport Records, 1999)
