= Lisa Bevill =

American contemporary Christian musician

- Born: June 24, 1961 (age 65)
- Origin: Asheville, North Carolina, U.S.
- Genres: Gospel, CCM
- Occupations: Christian music singer, songwriter
- Years active: 1992–present
- Labels: Vireo Records, Sparrow Records, Ministry Music, Lisa Bevill Music

Lisa Bevill (born June 24, 1961) is an American contemporary Christian musician. Bevill has released five albums: My Freedom (1992), All Because of You (1994), Love of Heaven (1996), Lisa Bevill (2000), and When the Healing Comes (2008).

== Personal life ==
North Carolina native Bevill and her husband Jeff have two grown sons and two grandchildren and live near Nashville, Tennessee. Retired from touring/performing onstage as a CCM artist as of 2008, she works as a studio singer, singing background vocals on albums and jingles/TV commercials/voiceover work. She is currently the voice of the "Stanley Steemer" TV/radio commercial.

Bevill also spends her time advocating for those newly diagnosed with Lyme disease. She herself spent 12 years in treatment and is currently Lyme-free. She advocates/educates and helps other Lyme sufferers get properly tested thru I-Genex and to find a LLMD in their area.

== Awards and nominations ==
- Dove Award Nomination - "Special Event Album of the Year for "My Utmost for His Highest" - "The Covenant" "I Will Follow You" Lisa Bevill and John Elefante
- Dove Award Nomination - "Special Event Album of the Year "Sisters: The Story Goes On", "Somehow She Stays" Lisa Bevill and Cynthia Clawson
- Best Christian Video / Christian Category - Houston Film Festival Gold Award: "Chaperone"
- Dove Award Nomination - "Best Short-Form Video of the Year": "Chaperone"

== Discography ==
=== Studio albums ===
- 1992: My Freedom
- 1994: All Because of You
- 1996: Love of Heaven
- 2000: Lisa Bevill
- 2008: When the Healing Comes

No. 1 songs from Bevill's career include "My Freedom", "Place in the Sun", "No Condemnation", "Turn and Love", "Tender Reed", "Only a Savior", and "If We're His", which was voted the No. 1 Inspirational Song of the Year in 1997 by CCM chart.
