= Kelly Willard =

Contemporary Christian musician (born 1956)

- Born: Kelly Bagley; August 18, 1956 (age 69)
- Origin: Winter Haven, Florida, U.S.
- Genres: CCM, Jesus music
- Occupations: Singer, songwriter
- Instruments: Piano, mandolin
- Years active: 1978–present
- Labels: Maranatha!, Autumn, Coyote Records
- Website: kellywillard.com

Kelly Willard (born on August 18, 1956) is a contemporary Christian musician best known for her praise and worship recordings. She was featured as a soloist on recordings from Integrity, Vineyard Music, and Maranatha! Music. Additionally she has sung duets and background vocals with such artists as Don Moen, Dion DiMucci, Lenny LeBlanc, Amy Grant, Ricky Skaggs, Paul Overstreet, Twila Paris, Steve Green, Fernando Ortega, Keith Green, Buddy Greene, Jim Cole and many others. Willard has also recorded nine solo projects.

Willard was born in Winter Haven, Florida. She began playing the piano at the age of five and composing her own songs at the age of thirteen. She accompanied the church choir, playing and singing in nursing homes, and traveled with a part-time gospel group on the weekends. At the age of sixteen Willard moved to Nashville, where she accompanied The Jake Hess Sound on piano. She then moved to Panorama City, California, where she joined the popular CCM group The Archers, and later went to Oklahoma City, Oklahoma joining the group Seth. She credits her vocal development to Jonathan David Brown and Harlan Rogers.

Willard married at 18, joined Harlan Rogers & Friends, and traveled the midwest until 1977. She moved to Southern California to be a part of the flow of 'Jesus Music' artists who were performing and recording there. She played keyboards and sang background vocals on projects for artists including Bob Bennett and Roby Duke before Maranatha! Music approached her in 1978 asking her to record her own solo project.

After the birth of her children, she took occasional sabbaticals, homeschooling them during the 1980s, 1990s. Later she took care of her mother, who had Alzheimer's. In 2004, both of her parents died, her 29-year marriage came to an end, and her 18-year-old daughter Haylie committed suicide after a struggle with severe depression. Willard later referred to the period in an interview as "the worst year of my life." She moved to Jacksonville, Florida, and became part of a church support community there.

Willard's latest album, recorded in 2000, titled Paga, features her son Bryan on bass guitar, and her daughter Haylie in a duet on the song "Beautiful Jesus". Kelly Willard lives in Florence, Alabama; she is writing and recording a new "duo" project with long-time friend, Rene Stamps.

== Discography ==
- 1978 Blame It on the One I Love
- 1980 Willing Heart
- 1983 Psalms, Hymns, and Spiritual Songs
- 1986 Message from a King
- 1991 Lookin' Back '77-'86
- 1991 Garden
- 1993 Bless My Little Girl
- 1996 My First Christmas
- 1996 Homesick for Heaven
- 2007 Paga
- 2012 Message from a King
