= Jonathan David Brown =

American record producer

- Brown in 1977, mixing Shotgun Angel in Hollywood

Background information
- Also known as: The Nazarite
- Born: November 20, 1955; Oklahoma City, Oklahoma, U.S.
- Died: September 27, 2016 (aged 60) Ozark, Missouri, U.S.
- Occupations: Producer, engineer
- Years active: 1974–2016
- Website: www.jonathandavidbrown.com

Jonathan David Brown (November 20, 1955 – September 27, 2016) was an American record producer and audio engineer known for his work on albums released in the Contemporary Christian music industry. Brown served federal prison time as an accessory after the fact for helping a member of the Tennessee White Knights of the Ku Klux Klan evade authorities.

Brown's production work started with several Maranatha! Music artists in the 1970s and continued through the 1980s, working with such artists as Petra, Twila Paris, Steve Taylor, Daniel Amos, Glen Campbell, Bob Bennett and David Meece. His work as a recording engineer includes albums for Mark Heard, Daniel Amos, Gentle Faith, and Tom Howard.

== Recording career ==
=== Seth ===
Brown was a member of Seth, a Jesus music group in the 1970s, playing keyboards and writing many of their songs. Other members included Kelly Willard, who went on to a solo career in worship music; Keith Edwards, who later was drummer with Amy Grant and Rich Mullins; and his sister Rhenda Edwards Tull, who later sang on Parable's first album. The band released two albums, a self-titled debut in 1974 and Psalms in 1975. The 1980 collection, Keep the Fire Burning, drew songs from both albums, adding a new title track.

=== Production ===
Brown engineered several albums for Maranantha! Music starting in 1975, including Daniel Amos' debut self-titled album from 1976. One of his first production credits was for their second album Shotgun Angel. Other Maranantha! production projects from the late 1970s included Sweet Comfort Band's self-titled debut, First Things First by Bob Bennett, and Blame It On The One I Love! by his former Seth bandmate Kelly Willard.

Brown's production work with Petra (five albums from 1981 to 1986) helped establish StarSong, a pioneering Christian rock label. When lead singer Greg X. Volz left the band, Brown produced several of his solo albums as well. Brown mentored the new band Farewell June and produced their debut album 1939, and the band was chosen as the opening act for Petra's farewell tour in 2005.

Brown continued to work with Bob Bennett (five albums from 1979 to 1991), and also produced albums by Twila Paris and David Meece through the 1980s. He produced Glen Campbell's 1991 gospel album Show Me Your Way, and Steve Taylor's debut EP and LP, I Want To Be A Clone and Meltdown. In a 1994 interview, Taylor mentioned that Brown had sung backing vocals on the anti-racism song "We Don't Need No Colour Code." In reference to remastering songs produced by Brown for a box set, Taylor said "the stuff that Jonathan produced and engineered, sonically and everything like that, he was a genius. And you won't hear me use that very often, but he was really a genius. It's like, we put that stuff up, and we didn't have to EQ it because whether you like the sound of it or not, sonically, it was really brilliant."

After returning to the Christian music industry in 2000, he recorded a CD with Karen Lafferty (songwriter of "Seek Ye First The Kingdom Of God") and mixed the album PAGA' for Kelly Willard, released in 2007. Brown also produced and performed on recordings by a folk artist from Upstate New York, Lisa Dudley. He developed and produced August Rain, a band from Georgia which had some radio success with the song "Wonderful Savior."

== Selected contributions ==
- Sail on Sailor, Mustard Seed Faith, Maranatha! Music 1975, mixing
- House-Between-Two-Rivers, Becky Ugartechea, Maranatha! Music 1976, engineering, mixing
- Free Indeed, Janny Grein, Sparrow Records 1976, engineering
- Daniel Amos, Daniel Amos, Maranatha! Music 1976, engineering, mixing
- Gentle Faith, Gentle Faith, Maranatha! Music 1976, engineering, mixing
- One Truth, One Truth, Sonrise Mercantile Company 1976, engineering
- Firewind (A Contemporary Dramatic Musical), various artists, Sparrow Records 1976, engineering
- View from the Bridge, Tom Howard, Solid Rock Records 1977, engineering, mixing
- Shotgun Angel, Daniel Amos, Maranatha! Music 1977, producer, engineering, mixing
- Sweet Comfort, Sweet Comfort Band, Maranatha! Music 1977, producer, engineering, mixing
- Empty Handed, John Pantry, Dove Records/Maranatha! Music 1978, mixing
- Spirit of St. Lewis, Lewis McVay, Maranatha! Music 1978, engineering
- Blame It on the One I Love!, Kelly Willard, Maranatha! Music 1978, producer, engineering, mixing
- Bethlehem, Bethlehem, Maranatha! Music 1978, engineering, mixing
- The Misfit, Erick Nelson and Michele Pillar, A&S/Maranatha! Music 1979, producer, engineering, mixing
- First Things First, Bob Bennett, Maranatha! Music 1979, producer, engineering, mixing
- Come for the Children, Oden Fong, Maranatha! Music 1979, producer, engineering, mixing
- Tamarack, Tamarack, Parbar/MRC 1981, producer
- This Side of Heaven, Beau MacDougall, Milk & Honey Records 1981, engineering, mixing
- Never Say Die, Petra, StarSong Records 1981, producer, engineering, mixing
- Stop the Dominoes, Mark Heard, Home Sweet Home Records 1981, engineering
- More Power to Ya, Petra, StarSong Records 1982, producer, engineering, mixing
- Not the Same, Roby Duke, MCA Songbird 1982, producer, engineering, mixing, arranging
- Matters of the Heart, Bob Bennett, CBS Priority Records 1982, producer, engineering, mixing
- I Want to Be a Clone , Steve Taylor, Sparrow Records 1983, producer, engineering, mixing
- Not of this World, Petra, StarSong Records 1983, producer, engineering, mixing
- Coming Attraction, Lewis McVay, Heartland Records 1984, engineering, mixing
- Meltdown, Steve Taylor, Sparrow Records 1984, producer, engineering, mixing
- Keep No Secrets, Morgan Cryar, StarSong Records 1984, producer, engineering, mixing
- Beat the System, Petra, StarSong Records 1985, producer, engineering, mixing
- Non-Fiction, Bob Bennett, StarSong Records 1985, producer, engineering, mixing
- Captured In Time & Space, Petra, StarSong Records 1986, producer, engineering, mixing
- The River Is Rising, Greg X. Volz, Myrrh Records 1986, producer, engineering, mixing
- Same Girl, Twila Paris, StarSong Records 1987, producer, engineering, mixing
- Candle In The Rain, David Meece, Myrrh Records 1987, producer
- For Every Heart, Twila Paris, StarSong Records 1988, producer, engineering, mixing
- Michele Wagner, Michele Wagner, Benson 1989, producer, engineering, mixing
- No Room in the Middle, Greg X. Volz, River Records 1989, producer, engineering, mixing

=== Solo album ===
Using the pseudonym The Nazarite, Brown released a solo album entitled Sinners in the Hands of an Angry God in 1997. Brown explained why he used the pseudonym:

I made the vow of the Nazarite for strength, spiritual and physical, in about 1989 [age 34]. The hair on my head is from then. When I went to prison, I understood why – I needed strength, lots of it. So I guess it's sort of like an enigma to some till they hear the explanation.

The album was named for the 1741 Jonathan Edwards sermon from the Great Awakening. The lyrics of the songs and Brown's editorial notes reflect his affinity for One Law Theology. The album track, "O House of Israel" has been used prominently as the theme song for Eliyahu ben David's radio show, "On The Road to Tsiyon".

== Federal prison ==
In 1992, Brown was sentenced to a 27-month federal prison term and fined $10,000 for accessory after the fact to a conspiracy to violate civil rights under 18 U.S.C. 3 and 241 (two of the hate crime laws in the United States), and for perjury under 18 U.S.C. 1623a. The court established that Brown helped Damien Patton, described by Nashville police as a juvenile "skinhead", hide from authorities and disguise his car after Patton and Leonard William Armstrong, the Grand Dragon of the Tennessee White Knights of the Ku Klux Klan, carried out a pre-dawn drive-by shooting of a Jewish synagogue in Nashville, Tennessee on June 10, 1990.

The court case revealed that in the evening of June 9, 1990, Brown attended a meeting of white supremacists known for their hatred of Jewish people. Patton and Armstrong were there as well. At 1:00 a.m. on June 10, Patton drove past the West End Synagogue in Nashville and Armstrong fired several shots through its windows with a TEC-9 assault weapon, injuring none as the building was unoccupied. On June 15, Brown's apartment was searched under warrant, with police looking for Patton. There, they seized articles belonging to Brown which, according to the court record, "indicat[ed] membership in the Ku Klux Klan and other white supremacist groups." In the days following the shooting incident, Brown helped Patton evade authorities by lying to police regarding Patton's whereabouts, by hiding him at his farm in Pleasantville, and by helping Patton change the color of his car from white to black with spray paint. Brown gave Patton a license plate from one of his trucks and supplied Patton with enough money to drive to Las Vegas and stay there. Some five months later, Brown allowed Patton to live again on his farm for a month. In September 1991, the FBI arrested Patton who plead guilty to his part in the synagogue shooting.

In front of the United States Court of Appeals for the Sixth Circuit in 1994, Brown sought to overturn his convictions based on his contention that the synagogue was owned by a corporation and not by citizens, and thus could not be covered by 42 U.S.C. Sec. 1982 (1988) which he argued applied solely to the property rights of citizens. Brown challenged as unwarranted the seizure of his personal property. The three-judge court upheld the convictions on March 21, 1995, with Circuit Judge Alice M. Batchelder dissenting from the main opinion of Boyce F. Martin, Jr. and Richard Alan Enslen. Batchelder held that the search warrants against Brown were invalid, and that, though the action of shooting at a synagogue should have been criminalized by 18 U.S.C. Sec. 247, the wording of that law was insufficient to give protection to people who utilize property such as a synagogue but who do not own a share of it. Batchelder wrote that Congress should amend the law to widen its coverage. Batchelder agreed with the court opinion that Brown's conviction of perjury should stand.

Brown refers to his incarceration as his "Federal Sabbatical".

== Lunar sabbath ==
Brown published the book Keeping Yahweh's Appointments in 1998, which explained the practice of counting the Sabbath from the New Moon day rather than using the modern seven-day week. The Lunar Sabbath movement has grown among the Armstrong/Worldwide Church of God, Seventh-day Adventists and Christian Identity movements.
