= CCM AC chart =

Adult contemporary music chart

CCM AC chart was an adult contemporary chart that was originally started by CCM Magazine in 1978.

According to author Jeffrey Lee Brothers in his book Hot Hits: AC Charts 1978 – 2001:

"When CCM published music charts, it received data from a specific number of radio stations regarding the number of times a song was played. This airplay data was then assigned points and weights based on the cumulative number of plays per song. The result was a weekly chart that ranked the most played, and presumably, most popular songs. The AC charts have long covered the most radio stations in the Christian music industry. The charts themselves have gone through several changes over the years. When CCM first published its radio hits charts, AC was not a recognized format. What is today considered adult contemporary was then covered under the title of contemporary hits. On September 30, 1981 CCM published its first AC chart, but only for a year. CHR (Contemporary Hit Radio) and AC merged again on October 6, 1982 until CCM split them again on May 6, 1985 to reflect the current formats."

== History ==
From July 1978 to September 1986, charts were mostly published in the same way, the only difference is that some started being published monthly, such as MusicLine in 1983.

On September 30, 1986 MusicLine charts became bi-weekly and was renamed The MusicLine Update. It published Christian Album charts as well as four radio charts: CHR (Christian Hit Radio)/Pop, AC (Adult Contemporary), Inspirational/Praise and Rock. While the magazine focused on the contemporary Christian music industry-related content that was previously included in CCM Magazine, CCM Magazine retained the consumer-related content.

In 1988, The MusicLine Update was renamed The CCM Update. On June 15, 1992, The CCM Update began publishing their charts weekly. In 1999, Salem Media Group acquires CCM Magazine and then on April 15, 2002, Salem closed The CCM Update. At that point, CCM turned over its data and charts to Radio & Records, which continued to publish weekly charts until July 2006.

Billboard magazine has since taken over the Christian charts with their Christian Airplay, Hot Christian Songs and Christian AC Airplay.

== Chart achievements ==
=== Most weeks at number one ===
Number of weeks	Artist(s)	Song	Year(s)
35	Barry McGuire	"Cosmic Cowboy"	1978-79
27	Andrus, Blackwood and Company	"Soldiers of the Light"	1981
20	Andrus, Blackwood and Company	"Jesus, You're So Wonderful (Live)"	1980-81
18	Don Francisco	"Got To Tell Somebody"	1979-80
18	Twila Paris	"The Warrior is a Child"	1984
16	Leon Patillo	"Cornerstone"	1982-83
15	Amy Grant	"Sing Your Praise to the Lord"	1982
15	Russ Taff	"We Will Stand"	1983
14	Don Francisco	"He's Alive"	1978
13	Dan Peek	"All Things Are Possible"	1979
13	Benny Hester	"When God Ran"	1985-86
13	Amy Grant	"Angels"	1984
13	The Imperials	"I'm Forgiven"	1980
13	Michele Pillar	"Look Who Loves You Now"	1984-85
10	Steve Camp	"He Covers Me"	1986

== See also ==
- Contemporary hit radio
- Christian contemporary hit radio
- Contemporary Christian music
- Christian AC
- Christian music industry
