= Star Song Communications =

- Type: Incentive
- Industry: Record label
- Founded: 1976
- Headquarters: United States

Star Song Communications is a Christian record label that was started in 1976 by Wayne Donowho, who recruited his friend Darrell Harris. It gained notoriety when it issued Resurrection Band's ground breaking debut album, Awaiting Your Reply in 1978. Originally, a distribution deal was made with Benson Records.

From 1983 until 1986, distribution was done by Word Records. After that, a deal was made with Sparrow Records. Independent distribution was started in 1989, and picked up distribution for ForeFront Records and DC Talk in 1991. This distribution was maintained until the sale of the company to EMI, and the launch of Chordant Distribution in 1994.

Pure Metal Records was acquired from Refuge Records in 1990.

In 1998, it was announced that Star Song would only be used to issue reprints, and their artists would be transferred to Sparrow.

== Artists ==
- Tom Autry
- Brian Barrett
- Barren Cross
- Bash 'n the Code
- Chris Beatty
- Benjamin
- Bob Bennett
- Aaron Benward
- Jeoffrey Benward
- Bride
- Keith Brown
- Chalice
- Steve & Annie Chapman
- Kemper Crabb
- Morgan Cryar
- Family Force 5
- Farrell & Farrell
- Don Francisco
- Disciples of Christ (later known as D.O.C. )
- Gaither Vocal Band
- Steve Geyer
- Giantkiller
- Jim Gill
- Pam Mark Hall
- Glass Harp
- Bryn Haworth
- Jeffrey Herrmann
- Maureen Herrmann
- Kim Hill
- Jimmy Hotz
- The Imperials
- In Reach
- Aaron Jeoffrey
- Justus
- King James
- Mylon LeFevre
- Mylon & Broken Heart
- Liberation Suite
- Debbie McClendon
- David Meece
- Kevin Max
- Tony Melendez
- Newsboys
- Nichole Nordeman
- Novella
- Jerome Olds
- John Pantry
- Painted Orange
- Twila Paris
- Michael Peace
- Matt Redman
- Michael Peace
- Petra
- Phillips, Craig and Dean
- Quickflight
- Dave Reader
- The RapSures
- Reality Check
- Linnae Reeves
- Resurrection Band
- David Robertson
- Say What?
- Scepter
- Jeff Scheetz
- Seraiah
- Seth
- Paul Smith
- Sierra
- The Swirling Eddies
- Two Hearts
- Tony Vincent
- The Walter Eugenes
- White Heart
- Whitecross
- Fletch Wiley
- Stephen Wiley
- Xalt
- Martin Bass

== Compilations ==
- Never Say Dinosaur (1996)

== See also ==
- List of Christian record labels
