= Reba Rambo =

American Christian singer and songwriter (born 1951)

- Born: October 17, 1951 (age 75); Dawson Springs, Kentucky, U.S.
- Other names: Reba, Reba Lady, Reba Rambo Gardner, Reba Rambo-McGuire
- Occupations: Singer; songwriter; author; minister
- Years active: 1965–present
- Spouses: Landy Gardner (m. 1975; div. 1979); Dony McGuire (m. 1980; div. 2019)
- Children: 3
- Parents: Dottie Rambo; Buck Rambo
- Family: Rambo
- Musical career
- Genres: Christian; southern gospel; contemporary Christian
- Instruments: Vocals; bass guitar; guitar; percussion
- Labels: Heart Warming; Impact; Light; Benson
- Formerly of: The Rambos
- Website: rebarambo.com

Reba Rambo (born October 17, 1951) is an American Christian singer and songwriter. She is a Grammy and Dove Award winner.

== Biography ==
=== 1965–1975: Early life and career beginnings ===
Rambo attended Hebron Elementary School in Hebron, Ohio and graduated from Dawson Springs High School in Dawson Springs, Kentucky. She said in an interview in 1971 that she never had formal training in music: "All I know was taught to me by Mom and Daddy."

At the age of 12, Reba started singing with her father and mother, Buck and Dottie Rambo, as the southern gospel family group, The Singing Rambos, later shortened to The Rambos. In 1967, the group toured Vietnam, performing for the troops. It was from that experience that Reba began writing her first song. “Keep on Marching Home” was set to the minor chords popular in the folk music that she had begun listening to. Upon returning home, she played it for The Rambos’ producer, Bob MacKenzie, who was creative director of John T. Benson’s Heart Warming Records, the label The Rambos recorded for. MacKenzie was already aware of congregations organizing folk masses and had first explored this new form of gospel a year prior when he recorded The New Folk, a group formed by the Campus Crusade for Christ. He suggested a folk-centered solo project for fifteen-year-old Reba. The finished product was titled On the Folk Side of Gospel and released in 1968. Billboard called the album “extremely beautiful” and praised the way she “encroaches deeply into the folk field, yet keeps close to the spirit.” In an October 1968 feature on The Rambos, Billboard later wrote that Reba “held the belief that gospel music could be presented in a folk manner, and then she proved it.”

As the Jesus movement broke into the mainstream consciousness at the beginning of the seventies, Reba was distinct as one of the few women at the forefront of the music of the movement. Her unique location inside of the established southern gospel community lent a certain validation to this evolving musical form, now being dubbed “Jesus Music,” which was still distrusted by many inside of the establishment church. It also endeared her to the Jesus People. One writer called her “somewhat of a heroine to the Jesus People.” The reach of Reba’s music went beyond the United States, even taking her to London’s Royal Albert Hall to perform with pop icon Cliff Richard, who had also embraced the movement.

Just after the release of her fourth solo album, Resurrection, she was invited to perform at Explo '72, now remembered as the "Christian Woodstock". Over 180,000 people gathered at the Cotton Bowl stadium in Dallas, Texas to hear a host of speakers and artists, including Andraé Crouch and The Disciples, Larry Norman, Children of the Day, Randy Matthews and The Archers. Shortly after Explo ’72, The Rambos stopped touring when Reba’s father, Buck, had five heart attacks in one year. Andraé and the Disciples came to Nashville to perform at the National Quartet Convention, one of the first Black groups to do so. Reba accompanied them to the performance and afterwards, Andraé’s sister, Sandra, invited Reba to come along with them for the last two weeks of the tour. Reba soon became a part of the group: the two-week tour lasted for eighteen months.

=== 1976–1983: Solo years ===
In 1976, Rambo's album Lady became one of the best-selling contemporary and inspirational albums of the year, with Reba being Record World Magazine’s #1 Top Female Contemporary Artist. Unlike her contemporaries in Jesus Music who had a folk-centered sound, Lady revealed a new possibility for this expanding genre, incorporating elements of jazz, soul and light rock. The album featured the song "The Land Of Oohs and Ahs", using imagery from The Wonderful Wizard of Oz to depict heaven and the spiritual life. Record World called Rambo “one of the most important female contemporary Christian artists in the field today” in a 1977 feature. Lady won a Dove Award for Contemporary Album of the Year, and the album was nominated for a Grammy Award for Best Gospel Performance, Contemporary or Inspirational. Lady established Reba as the premier "adult contemporary singer" in Christian music.

Reba left The Rambos in 1977 to pursue her full-time solo career. Lady’s follow-up, The Lady is a Child, released in January 1978, was given an ample budget by the Benson Company, allowing Reba to really display the full range of her talent and imagination. From the 1940s Andrews Sisters-styled “All Day Dinner,” to the disco epic “Child of the Music Maker” to the Black gospel of “Go Ye” and then to the sophisticated string-sweetened title track, Reba raised the bar for what artistry within Jesus Music could look like. Campus Life Magazine called it “impressively orchestrated,” comparing Reba to Barbra Streisand, declaring “the lady is a singer.” Cash Box also noted the comparisons to Streisand and Diana Ross, but said “Reba, the singer, is original; and Reba, the writer, brilliant…the album is a classic.” The album would earn a Grammy nomination and would once again make Reba Record World Magazine’s Top Female Artist (Contemporary) of 1978. The Lady is a Child would also be used as part of an audio/visual test in mainstream retail outlets. In-store displays for the album made sales jump “sevenfold,” according to Billboard Magazine. “The Reba (Rambo) experience demonstrates…that that in-store projectors can create demand for a relatively unknown artist whose albums do not normally figure in mass merchandise outlets.”

The Prodigal…According to Reba, released in 1979, would further expand the creative and commercial possibilities of contemporary Christian music. Several of the tracks were co-produced by Andraé Crouch collaborator Bill Maxwell, utilizing some of Los Angeles’ most in-demand session players and singers. She also began working with her label mate, Dony McGuire, who brought his R&B influenced style to the production. The package itself included an elaborate six-page insert that included song lyrics, stories behind the songs and glamorous photos. With this presentation, however, Reba crossed the invisible line that women had to intuitively navigate. In their review of The Prodigal, Campus Life critic Steve Lawford praised the album’s content, saying that “it’s a first-class production, chock full of the slick sound of the 70’s—like Reba herself, very posh, very uptown. The lady possesses a most expressive voice which she uses with assurance and power.” He then states, however, that “you quickly get the idea that Reba is very occupied with Reba, verging too much towards playing the vamp. The booklet that accompanies this album features Reba in various chic poses…reminiscent of Cher. Ugh! Why bother? Her penchant for this glamour posturing is wearing thin.” He gave the album a mere 2 1/2 stars. Understanding the constrictions of the Christian market, Cash Box immediately addressed the cover and interior art in their review, stating that “the cover, jacket and the music are all classy, something akin to heresy in some gospel music camps.” They deemed the album “a showcase of art” that was “striving for new sounds to stir the emotions and a few words to hide in the heart.”

Aside from the interior booklet, the album cover itself caused a controversy when it arrived in Christian bookstores. The cover showed Reba in a tattered dress, sitting in a pile of trash, holding a dead bird. Shot at Union Station, an abandoned Nashville train station, the cover was deemed inappropriate and the record company swiftly replaced the cover with a plain Black cover with a centered headshot of Reba. While initially charting at #12 with a bullet on Cash Box’s July 14, 1979 Inspirational Albums chart, the album only stayed on the chart for six weeks. It would be the last of her solo albums to chart to date. She promoted the album on The PTL Club and The 700 Club and performed for President Jimmy Carter at the White House in September of that year.

As the news of her divorce from Landy Gardner began to circulate to the public, her concert dates were canceled, radio stations pulled her music from their playlists and some Christian bookstores stopped stocking her albums. She owed Benson a final album which they gave her a small budget to complete. Despite the lack of budget and label support, Dreamin’ was a critical success with CCM Magazine saying that “it may be her best yet.” Record World agreed, “Reba is synonymous with great songs and dynamic performances. This LP proves no exception.”

Ralph Carmichael at Light Records, home to gospel luminaries Andraé Crouch and the Hawkins Family, however, was thrilled to sign Reba, despite the controversy, in early 1980. He told CCM Magazine, “Reba is the most progressive contemporary female artist in the gospel field today. I want Reba to stay in the field and use all the talents God has given her. She can have a tremendous influence.” She went to work on her first two projects for Light, both in collaboration with Dony McGuire, who had also moved to Light from Greentree Records. The first was a musical concept album called The Lord’s Prayer, the second was a new solo album which would be titled Confessions. An interview with CCM Magazine while working on the Light projects doesn't directly mention the divorce or the aftermath. The writer only states that “Reba’s first solo LP on Light Records…records Reba’s very personal and sometimes painful journey through the last three years, leading her towards a personal, spiritual victory which she says is just now beginning.”

When she and McGuire married in the fall of 1980, the controversy surrounding Reba escalated. One disc jockey told Billboard that “after Light Records artist Reba Rambo was divorced and remarried, the station quit playing her records despite her overall popularity and acceptance in the gospel field.” Reviews of the new projects passively fueled the controversy, referencing McGuire as Rambo’s “new husband and long-time co-songwriter.”

While she faced the harshest criticism from the church, she would simultaneously receive greater acknowledgment and recognition from her peers in the music industry. The Lord’s Prayer won a Grammy Award for Best Gospel Performance, Contemporary or Inspirational in 1981. She, McGuire and the artists who were also featured on the album, Andrae Crouch, B.J. Thomas, Cynthia Clawson, Walter Hawkins, Tramaine Hawkins and The Archers, performed a medley of selections from the album on the telecast, “receiving one of the few standing ovations of the evening.” The Grammy would open other doors. Later that year, she would appear on network television by way of The Mike Douglas Show and the Jerry Lewis Muscular Dystrophy Telethon. A full production of The Lord’s Prayer at Knott’s Berry Farm, outside of Los Angeles, drew more than 18,000 people. Later, Donna Summer recorded "Forgive Me", a song from The Lord's Prayer and received a Grammy award for her performance.

She recorded her last solo album, titled Lady Live, in June 1981 at the Anaheim Convention Center in California for an audience of almost ten thousand. Contemporary Christian Music Magazine called the album “Reba’s most convincing and powerful project yet,” and said that “it does not take a connoisseur of fine music to appreciate the amount of practice, rehearsal and real work needed to pull together such a class act.” Billboard gushed that “her voice sweeps, soars and suspends itself effortlessly,” complimenting her “easy and affectionate interplay with her audience.” The more conservative Charisma Magazine, however, wrote a scathing review. The critic said that the album was “self-important” and “as shallow as a West Texas stock pond.” They further described her singing as “shrieking and cajoling,” and purported that “Reba consistently oversings every song, sending her thin little voice through all sort of vocal contortions.” The review seemed more of a response to Reba’s mainstream success and not the album itself. “Reba is hot right now,” he wrote, “her personal appearances are drawing large crowds and a number of artists are recording her songs. Light Records packaged this live album with a handsome set of graphics and a Hollywood-styled cover. All for naught.”

At the Billboard Gospel Conference in 1982, Rambo was a panelist in the “Artist Perspective” discussion. As the group discussed the question “How secular is too secular,” Rambo said, “I want to talk to those who haven’t heard about Jesus. But I want to talk about love too. It doesn’t hurt for me to perform love songs. That is sacred too.” She told Billboard later that year, “People don’t want condemnation crammed down their throat.” Her assertion that Christian music should be more than just “the four spiritual laws,” as she quipped on Lady Live, would become an even more heated debate as the eighties progressed, as Sandi Patty and Amy Grant would soon pick up where Reba’s solo career would leave off.

Her contract with Light ended with 1982's Messiah Bright Morning Star, a second collaborative musical akin to The Lord's Prayer.

Retrospectively, John Styll, founder and then-editor of CCM Magazine called Reba Rambo "one of the best singers I've ever heard."

=== 1984–2018: Rambo McGuire ===
Reba and Dony officially merged as Rambo McGuire in 1984, shifting their focus out of the mainstream, and in a sense, the Christian music industry, and back inside of the church community. They recorded over a dozen albums under the Rambo McGuire moniker through the 1990s and 2000s, with their children joining the group as well. Rambo McGuire received a Dove Award in 2012 for Grassroots Rambos, a collection of Dottie Rambo compositions. Reba and Dony also wrote for a range of artists in and out of Christian music, including Debby Boone, The Bill Gaither Trio, The Archers, Sandi Patty, David and Nicole Binion and Dave Boyer. Their song, "A Perfect Heart", became a number one Christian radio hit for The Bill Gaither Trio. They started a ministry, The River at Music City, in 2001. Reba began mentoring young writers by way of The Writing Room, a songwriting course that she teaches in Nashville. In 2019, Reba and Dony divorced.

=== 2019–Present: Reemergence ===
After decades of being out of print, Rambo's solo albums are beginning to become available on digital music outlets for the first time. A digital remastering of Lady was reissued by Provident Distribution Group on December 13, 2019. Light Records has followed suit, reissuing Confessions on May 1, 2020. Reba continues to write songs and minister as a solo artist, collaborating with singer/songwriter Margaret Becker, Tim Miner and Tery Wayne.

== Discography ==
=== Solo albums ===
List of albums
Title	Album details
On the Folk Side of Gospel	Released: 1968; Label: Heart Warming; Formats: LP
Reality	Released: 1969; Label: Impact; Formats: LP, cassette
Songs My Mama Taught Me	Released: 1971; Label: Impact; Formats: LP, cassette, 8-track
Resurrection	Released: 1972; Label: Impact; Formats: LP, cassette, 8-track
Lady	Released: 1976; Label: Greentree; Formats: LP, cassette, 8-track, digital download, streaming
The Lady Is a Child	Released: January 1978; Label: Greentree; Formats: LP, cassette, 8-track
The Prodigal… According to Reba	Released: 1979; Label: Greentree; Formats: LP, cassette, 8-track
Dreamin'	Released: April 1980; Label: Greentree; Formats: LP, cassette, 8-track
Confessions	Released: December 1980; Label: Light; Formats: LP, cassette, 8-track, digital download, streaming
Remembering (compilation)	Released: 1981; Label: Greentree; Formats: LP, cassette, 8-track
Lady Live	Released: 1982; Label: Light; Formats: LP, cassette
The Lady’s Treasury	Released: 2011; Label: RMR; Formats: CD, digital download, streaming

=== With Dony McGuire ===
List of albums
Title	Album details
The Lord's Prayer	Released: 1980; Label: Light; Formats: LP, cassette, CD, digital download, streaming
Messiah Bright Morning Star	Released: 1982; Label: Light; Formats: LP, cassette

=== With Rambo McGuire ===
- 1984: Special Moments from The Bride (Impact)
- 1986: Plain and Simple Truth (Benson)
- 1987: Enlistment (Benson)
- 1990: Mission Possible (RMR)
- 1992: Live in the Combat Zone (RMR)
- 1992: Come on and Walk on the Water (single) (RMR)
- 1993: Suddenly (Word)
- 1994: The Noteworthy Collection, Volumes 1 and 2 (RMR)
- 1998: Praise & Worship Celebrating The River (RMR)
- 1999: Praise & Worship Holiness of God (RMR)
- 2000: Rambo McGuire Family Christmas (RMR)
- 2011: The Noteworthy Collection Volumes 1 & 2 (Rambo McGuire Records)
- 2011: Grassroots Rambos – Remembering The Rambos (Rambo McGuire Records)
- 2014: Rambo Classics (Rambo McGuire Records)
- 2016: Rambo Classics (StowTown Records)

=== Appearances on other recordings ===
- 1970: Charity's Children
- 1978: Unreleased Covers – Donnie Gossett
- 1979: On This Christmas Night (MCA Songbird) "The Whole World Is Colored with Love"
- 1981: Looking Forward – Bob Bailey (Triangle) "I'm Looking Forward"
- 1981: Dony McGuire: The Writer, The Singer - Inspiration (Lexicon) --Dony McGuire
- 2000: Bigger Than Life – Donnie Gossett and Friends (Zilla Media) "Best Friend"
- 2003: The Sound of Heaven – David and Nicole Binion (SOH)
- 2004: Holding On to Faith – Karen Harding (Daywind) "Because Of Whose I Am"
- 2004: We Have Overcome – Christ Tabernacle Choir (Vital) "What You Say Is What You Get"
- 2005: Remembering the Greats (Daywind) "I've Never Been This Homesick Before", "Because Of Whose I Am"
- 2005: Supernatural – Jeff Ferguson (Jeff Ferguson Music) (title song)
- 2006: When Heaven Kisses Earth – David & Nicole Binion (SOH) "Pray For Rain Medley"
- 2008: The Beginnings Concert – Jesus Music Reunion "Never Ending Love", "Land of Oohs and Aahs", "Supernatural"

==== Background vocals ====
- 1978: Love Letters – Dottie Rambo (Heart Warming)
- 1978: Songtailor – Tim Sheppard (Greentree)
- 1981: Inspiration – Dony McGuire
- 1981: My Own Place – Dottie Rambo (Heart Warming)
- 1983: Son of Thunder, Daughter of Light – Buck and Dottie Rambo (Light) (re-issued as Dottie Rambo Oil and the Wine in 1994)
- 1983: Walls of Glass – Russ Taff (Myrrh) "Unto the Lamb"
- 1983: Surrender – Debby Boone (Lamb & Lion)
- 1984: Destined for the Throne – Buck and Dottie Rambo (Impact)
- 1986: Reaching Around the World – Buck and Dottie Rambo (Benson)
- 1987: The Legend Continues – Buck and Dottie Rambo (Benson)
- 1997: Earthsuit – Headless Clown (EP)
- 2008: Treasure – Janet Paschal (Vine Records)

== Video ==
- 1993: A Christmas Homecoming – Gaither Homecoming (Star Song)
- 2003: We Shall Behold Him – A Tribute to Dottie Rambo (Total Living Network)
- 2005: Remembering the Greats (Daywind); "I've Never Been This Homesick Before", "Because Of Whose I Am"
- 2008: The Beginnings Concert – Jesus Music Reunion; "Never Ending Love", "Land of Oohs and Aahs", "Supernatural"

== Solo awards and nominations ==
=== Gospel Music Association Dove Awards ===
The Gospel Music Association Dove Awards were created in 1969 by the Gospel Music Association to honor the outstanding achievements in Christian music. As a solo artist, Rambo has received two awards from eight nominations.

Year	Nominee / work	Award	Result
1970	Reba Rambo	Most Promising New Gospel Talent	Nominated
1971	Reba Rambo	Female Vocalist of the Year	Nominated
1972	Songs My Mama Taught Me	Best Backliner Notes of a Gospel Album	Nominated
1977	Lady	Contemporary Album of the Year	Won
1977	Reba Rambo	Female Vocalist of the Year	Nominated
1978	The Lady Is a Child	Contemporary Album of the Year	Nominated
1981	The Lord's Prayer (with Dony McGuire/Various)	Praise and Worship Album of the Year	Won
1982	Reba Rambo	Female Vocalist of the Year	Nominated

=== Grammy Awards ===
The Grammy Awards are awarded annually by the National Academy of Recording Arts and Sciences of the United States. As a solo artist, Rambo has received one award from four nominations. She also has an additional six nominations as a member of The Rambos.

Year	Nominee / work	Award	Result
1978	Lady	Best Gospel Performance, Contemporary or Inspirational	Nominated
1979	The Lady Is a Child	Best Gospel Performance, Contemporary or Inspirational	Nominated
1981	The Lord's Prayer (with The Archers, Cynthia Clawson, Andraé Crouch, Tramaine Hawkins, Walter Hawkins, Dony McGuire, and B. J. Thomas)	Best Gospel Performance, Contemporary or Inspirational	Won
1983	Lady Live	Best Gospel Performance, Contemporary or Inspirational	Nominated
