= Lift Up the Lord =

Studio album by Sandi Patti
- Released: 1982
- Studio: Bullet Recording Studio, Nashville, Tennessee; Great Circle Sound, Nashville, Tennessee; The Barn, Anderson, Indiana
- Genre: CCM, gospel
- Length: 33:59
- Label: Impact
- Producer: Greg Nelson

Sandi Patti chronology
Love Overflowing (1981)	Lift Up the Lord (1982)	More Than Wonderful (1983)

Alternative cover
- 1987 Benson Records reissue cover, later used by Word Records in 1990

Professional ratings
Review scores
Source	Rating
AllMusic	2/5 stars

Lift Up the Lord is the fourth studio album by Christian singer Sandi Patti, released in 1982 on Impact Records. The track "How Majestic Is Your Name" was written by up and coming singer/songwriter Michael W. Smith and it has become one of Patti's signature songs and has been often performed in her concerts. In 1983, the album was named Inspirational Album of the Year at the 14th GMA Dove Awards and was nominated for Best Gospel Performance, Contemporary or Inspirational at the 25th Grammy Awards. Benson Records re-issued Lift Up the Lord on CD in 1987 with a new cover featuring an updated photo of Patti. Word Records would use the same cover for their re-issue in 1990. In 1984, Lift Up the Lord peaked at No. 12 on the Top Christian Albums chart.

== Track listing ==
No.	Title	Writer(s)	Length
1.	"Lift Up the Lord"	Billy Smiley, Gary McSpadden, Sandi Patti	2:44
2.	"How Majestic Is Your Name"	Michael W. Smith	2:22
3.	"They Could Not"	Ron Harris, Claire Cloninger	5:33
4.	"Let Us Rejoice"	Billy Smiley	3:04
5.	"Jesus, Lord To Me"	Greg Nelson, Gary McSpadden	4:25
6.	"I Will Lift You There"	Dottie Rambo, Dony McGuire	4:11
7.	"Let Him Hold Your Heart"	Pete & Cindy Carlson	3:18
8.	"My God Is Real (Yes, God Is Real)"	Kenneth Morris	3:40
9.	"Jesus, You're Everything"	Sandi Patti, John Helvering	3:13
10.	"Jesus, Lord To Me" (Reprise)	Greg Nelson, Gary McSpadden	1:08

Note: On track 8, the title would later change to "Yes, God Is Real" on the 1987 Benson Records re-issue and again in 1990 on the Word Records re-issue.

== Charts ==
Year	Chart	Position
1984	US Top Contemporary Christian Albums	12

=== Radio singles ===
Year	Singles	Peak positions	
Year	Singles	CCM AC	CCM CHR
1982	"How Majestic Is Your Name"	6	12

== Accolades ==
GMA Dove Awards

- 1983 Female Vocalist of the Year

Year	Winner	Category
1983	Lift Up the Lord	Inspirational Album of the Year
