= Stand Up! (album) =

Studio album by The Archers
- Released: 1979
- Recorded: 1978–1979
- Genre: Contemporary Christian
- Label: Light
- Producer: Larry Muhoberac, John Guess

The Archers chronology
Fresh Surrender (1977)	Stand Up! (1979)	Celebrate - Live (1980)

Stand Up! (see 1979 in music) was The Archers fifth studio album and fourth Light Records release. It was co-produced by Elvis Presley’s TCB Band keyboardist Larry Muhoberac and studio engineer John Guess.

Stand Up! was the first album in which former female vocalist Nancye Short-Tsapralis did not participate. Although Tsapralis sang background vocals on the prior Fresh Surrender project (un-credited), Janice Archer’s voice was used on female leads. Recording began in late 1978 and continued through early 1979. It is distinctive for a number of notable guest artist appearances, including Billy Preston, who played the Hammond B-3 on the group’s cover of his spiritual, “God Loves You”, which also featured Sandra Crouch and Nichol Larson on back-up vocals.

Steely Dan alumnus Ernie Watts was also featured on tenor sax for the up-tempo song "Only His Love". Once again, the group was accompanied by a virtual “who's who” of LA studio players, with David Hungate returning on bass along with Reinie Press and Dean Parks on guitar. Also featured were Archers’ tour band players, Phil Kristianson (keyboards) and Tony Sena (guitar).

The album produced a number of hits, most notably Steve Archer’s title tune and Tim Archer’s "Pickin’ Up The Pieces". Also receiving solid airplay were “Fools Paradise”, Janice Archer’s cover of Kelly Willard’s smash “Blame It On The One I Love”.

== Track listing ==
1. “Only His Love” – Aldridge (4:39)
2. “We’re All Gonna Leave Here” – Hockensmith/Hibbard (3:09)
3. “Fools Paradise” – Bower (3:55)
4. “Moments With You” – Learning (3:50)
5. “Stand Up!” – Archer/Kristianson (4:45)
6. “Blame It On The One I Love” – Willard (2:45)
7. “More (More So Much More)” – Aldridge (3:32)
8. “Livin’ In Your Love” – Sherberg (4:13)
9. “God Loves You” – Preston (2:51)
10. "Pickin' Up the Pieces" - T. Archer

== Personnel ==
- Guitars: Tim May; Dean Parks; Greg Porée; Tony Sena; Thom Rotella
- Bass: David Hungate; Reinie Press
- Drums: Mike Baird; Paul Leim
- Keyboards: Phil Kristianson; Larry Muhoberac
- Percussion: King Errisson
- Orchestra: Jimmy Getzoff Concertmaster
- Vocal arrangements: Tim Archer, Steve Archer
- Rhythm and orchestration: Larry Muhoberac
- Producer(s): Larry Muhoberac, John Guess
- Associate producers: Tim Archer, Steve Archer
