= Celebrate – Live =

Celebrate - Live

Live album by The Archers
- Released: 1980
- Recorded: at Melodyland Christian Center in California
- Genre: Christian rock
- Label: Light

The Archers chronology
Stand Up! (1979)	Celebrate - Live (1980)	The Lord's Prayer (1980)

Celebrate – Live was the only live album released for The Archers, and the last release of their original contract with Light Records. Recorded at “Melodyland Christian Center,” in Southern California.

== Track listing ==
1. "Celebrate" (Riso)
2. "Wonderful To Feel Your Love" (Thomas)
3. "Where Could I Go" (Coats)
4. "Lord, Keep Your Lovin' Hand On Me" (Learning)
5. "Sunshine On A Cloudy Day" (Archer, Dan Cutrona)
6. "I'm Gonna Rise" (Nancye Short-Tsapralis)
7. "It Wouldn't Be Enough" (Aldridge)
8. "Waitin', Anticipatin'" (T. Archer, S. Archer)
9. "Fresh Surrender" (Billy Rush Masters)
10. "Stand Up" (Archer, Phil Kristianson)
11. "Celebrate (Reprise)" (Riso)

=== Personnel ===
- Michael Fickling – drums
- Tim Jaquette - bass guitar
- Tony Sena - electric guitar
- Phil Kristianson - Hammond B-3, clavinet, Fender Rhodes, synthesizers
- Dan Cutrona - acoustic piano, synthesizers, vibraphone, marimba
- Paul Bahn – percussion
- Sandra Couch – percussion
- Steve Archer – percussion
- Charles Davis – trumpet
- Larry Hall – trumpet
- Bill Reichenbach - trombone, euphonium
- Gary Herbig - saxophone, flute
- Stephanie Reach - backing vocals
