= Love Overflowing =

Studio album by Sandi Patti
- Released: 1981
- Studios: The Lower Level (Nashville, Tennessee); The Barn (Anderson, Indiana); Glaser Sound (Nashville, Tennessee); Great Circle Sound (Nashville, Tennessee); Pinebrook Recording (Anderson, Indiana)
- Genres: CCM, gospel
- Length: 36:34
- Label: Impact
- Producer: Neal Joseph

Sandi Patti chronology
Sandi's Song (1979)	Love Overflowing (1981)	Lift Up the Lord (1982)

Alternative cover
- 1987 Benson Records reissue cover, later used by Word Records in 1990

Professional ratings
Review scores
Source	Rating
AllMusic	2/5 stars

Love Overflowing is the third studio album by Christian singer Sandi Patti, released in 1981 on Impact Records. It would be the beginning of her reign at the GMA Dove Awards as Female Vocalist of the Year as a title she would win for the next 11 years until 1992. The track "We Shall Behold Him" written by Dottie Rambo would be her signature song and a concert favorite as Patti has performed this at everyone of her concerts until her retirement from touring in 2016 and would win 2 Dove Awards for Song of the Year and Songwriter of the Year, both given to Rambo. In 1984, Love Overflowing climbed to No. 26 on the Top Christian Albums chart.Benson Records re-issued Love Overflowing on CD in 1987 with a new cover featuring a portrait painting of Patti. Word Records would use the same cover for their re-issue in 1990.

== Track listing ==
No.	Title	Writer(s)	Length
1.	"Down In My Heart"	Gary Chapman, Sandi Patti	2:43
2.	"Keeper Of The Well"	Dottie Rambo	3:08
3.	"Love Overflowing"	Claire Cloninger, Ron Harris	3:49
4.	"So Far"	Dawn Rodgers	3:29
5.	"When The Time Comes"	David Kavich	5:02
6.	"The Home Of The Lord" (duet with Russ Taff)	David Diggs, Robert Mason, Jonathan Michaels	3:19
7.	"Somebody Believed"	Gary Dunham, Rosemary Dunham	3:01
8.	"In His Hand"	Gary Chapman, Michael W. Smith	3:23
9.	"We Shall Behold Him"	Dottie Rambo	5:55
10.	"I Will Praise Him"	David T. Clydesdale	3:11

== Charts ==
Chart (1984)	Peak position
US Top Contemporary Christian Albums	26

=== Radio singles ===
Year	Singles	Peak positions
Year	Singles	CCM AC
1981	"We Shall Behold Him"	8

== Accolades ==
GMA Dove Awards

- 1982 Female Vocalist of the Year
- 1982 Artist of the Year
