= Things We Deeply Feel =

Studio album by The Archers
- Released: 1975
- Genre: Christian rock
- Label: Light

The Archers chronology
Keep Singin' That Love Song (1974)	Things We Deeply Feel (1975)	Fresh Surrender (1977)

Things We Deeply Feel the fourth album release for The Archers and their first release for the West Coast’s powerful CCM franchise, Light Records. The record company went all out for the project, bringing in some of Hollywood’s top studio players, including several Steely Dan alumni. Released before national charts were created, it spawned several top airplay list hits, including the #1 “It Wouldn’t Be Enough”.

== Track listing ==
1. "Music (He Brings A New Song)" (Billy Rush Masters, Cole) – 3:35
2. "Giver Of Life" (Masters) – 3:27
3. "Sit Yourself Down" (Nancye Short-Tsapralis) – 2:54
4. "Lord You’ve Being Good To Me" (Andrae Crouch) – 2:47
5. "It Wouldn’t Be Enough" (Aldridge) – 3:59
6. "I’m With Jesus" (D. Erwin) – 3:15
7. "Brand New Day" (Masters) – 3:31
8. "You Are My Inspiration" (Masters) – 2:58
9. "If You Can’t Believe In Love" (Paxton, Hellard) – 3:17
10. "It’s Love To Me" (Masters, Aldridge) – 3:01
11. "Praise Him" (Masters, Aldridge) – 2:52

== Personnel ==
- Jay Graydon – guitar
- Ben Benay – guitar
- Lee Ritenour – guitar
- Dan Ferguson – guitar
- Red Rhodes – pedal steel
- Leland Sklar – bass
- David Paich – keyboards
- Ed Green – drums
- Hal Blaine – drums
- Allan Estes – percussion
- Harold Hensley – electric fiddle
- Hy Lesnick – orchestra conductor
