= Muhoberac =

The surname Muhoberac is derived from the Croatian words muha meaning "fly" and berac (from brati) meaning "picker." Historically, this name has significant agricultural connotations related to the challenges faced by early cultivators in the Dubrovnik region.

== Historical context ==
In the 16th century, as various crops were cultivated in the area, strong winds frequently devastated the harvests. The arrival of potato seeds via ships in Dubrovnik marked a pivotal breakthrough in local agriculture, providing a new solution to combat famine. However, the occurrence of the Colorado potato beetle (Leptinotarsa decemlineata) soon threatened these crops. This pest caused considerable damage by laying eggs on the potato plant leaves, and the larvae fed on the plants.

== Early pest control ==
Amid this agricultural crisis, one family emerged as early pest controllers by manually picking the beetle eggs off the plants, thereby saving their crops. This diligent practice led to the family adopting the name Muhoberac, symbolizing their role as "fly pickers" in the community.

== Legacy ==
The Muhoberac family continues to reside in the Dubrovnik area, originating from the village Muhoberci near Knezica, though many descendants have since emigrated to Argentina, the United States, and Austria. Their historical significance highlights both the agricultural challenges of the past and the contributions of local families to pest control methods in the region.

Notable people with the surname include:

- Jamie Muhoberac (born 1965), American musician
- Larry Muhoberac (1937–2016), American musician, record producer, and composer, father of Jamie
