= The Archers (album) =

Studio album by The Archers
- Released: 1973
- Recorded: TTG Recording Studios
- Genre: Christian rock
- Label: Charisma
- Producer: Gary Archer

The Archers chronology
The Archers (1973)	Keep Singin' That Love Song (1974)

The Archers was the first nationally released major label album for The Archers. Originally released as Any Day Now in 1972 on their independent Charisma Records label, it garnered the group almost immediate national attention and launched them on to the national stage. Issued before radio charts for Jesus music or Contemporary Christian music were established, it included the hits, "Life In Jesus", "Jesus Is The Answer" and "God's Love".

On the strength of the album, The Archers appeared at Explo '72 in the summer of that year, and on to other major concert appearances at Madison Square Garden, the Arie Crown Theater in Chicago's McCormack Place and the Jesus Joy festival in following months. The John T. Benson Company bought Charisma Records later that year, signing the group to their first recording contract, resulting in the album's retitled release.

== Track listing ==
1. "God's Love" (Billy Rush Masters)
2. "I've A Friend" (Masters)
3. "Put On Jesus" (Masters)
4. "Life In Jesus" (Stipe)
5. "It Won't Be Long" (Andrae Crouch)
6. "As Long As I Know" (Nancye Short)
7. "Basically Roamin'" (Masters)
8. "Jesus Is The Answer" (Crouch)
9. "God's Throne" (Archer)
10. "For Me For You" (Masters)

== Personnel ==
- Billy Rush Masters – guitar
- Tim "Jake" Jaquette – bass
- Tim Short – drums
- Tim Johnson – keyboards
- The Philharmonic – orchestration
- Gary Archer – producer
- Ami Hadami (TTG Recording Studios) – engineer
- Bob McConnell – art direction
- Bill Grine – cover photography
