= All Systems Go =

All Systems Go may refer to:

- All Systems Go!, a Canadian punk rock band, or their debut album
- ASG, an American rock band, initially called All Systems Go
- All Systems – Go!, a 1965 album by The Honeycombs
- All Systems Go (Donna Summer album), 1987
  - "All Systems Go" (song)
- All Systems Go (Rocket from the Crypt album), a compilation album, followed by two further volumes
- All Systems Go (Vinnie Vincent Invasion album), 1988
- "All Systems Go", a song from Box Car Racer (album), 2002
- "All Systems Go", a song by Mondo Generator from the 2006 album, Dead Planet
- "All Systems Go!" a systemd focused conference

== See also ==
- All Systems Are Go, a 1984 album by The Archers
