= Fresh Surrender =

Studio album by The Archers
- Released: 1977
- Genre: Christian rock
- Label: Light

The Archers chronology
Things We Deeply Feel (1975)	Fresh Surrender (1977)	Stand Up! (1979)

Fresh Surrender was The Archers fourth studio album and third Light Records release. It and its title song were nominated for a Gospel Music Association (GMA) Dove Award, and claimed an astounding seven airplay hits for the Jesus music stars. Perhaps more importantly it signaled a marked change for the band, both in sound and appearance. It was recorded on the departure of two founding-members, Billy Rush Masters, who wrote the song “Fresh Surrender” and Nancye Short-Tsapralis who had been linchpins in the creation of the group’s sound and writing team for six years. Now a trio with sister, Janice Archer, who had been traveling with the combo for some time, The Archers took off in a new direction that would define them for the rest of their career. The project was arranged by Elvis Presley's original TCB Band keyboardist, Larry Muhoberac who went on to co-produce The Archers' next album, Stand Up! also released by Light Records. Once again, the band was joined in the studio by an elite group of Los Angeles recording musicians, including Steely Dan alumni Ben Benay, Dean Parks, Lee Ritenour, Wilton Felder, David Hungate, Mike Baird, and Jim Keltner.

== Track listing ==
(audio samples for tracks are here)

1. “I Need You” (Billy Rush Masters) – 3:33
2. “Fresh Surrender” (Masters) – 2:55
3. “With Every Breath I Take” (Aldridge) – 4:28
4. “Water Into Wine” (Steve Archer) – 3:16
5. “Give Him Praise” (Phil Kristianson) – 4:48
6. “I’m Gonna Rise” (Nancye Short-Tsapralis) – 3:12
7. “Change” (Short-Tsapralis) – 3:31
8. “Sanctified Life” (Archer, Kristianson) – 3:33
9. “Make Me An Instrument” (Coffey) – 4:41
10. “You Know The Future” (Learning) – 4:23

== Personnel ==
- Ben Benay – guitar
- Dean Parks – guitar
- Lee Ritenour – guitar
- Tony Sena – guitar
- Fred Tackett – guitar
- Wilton Felder – bass
- David Hungate – bass
- Reinie Press – bass
- Mike Baird – drums
- Jim Keltner – drums
- Paul Leim – drums
- Dennis Holt – percussion
- Phil Kristianson – keyboards
- Larry Muhoberac – keyboards, rhythm, orchestration
- Jimmy Getzoff – concertmaster
- Tim Archer – vocal arrangements
- Steve Archer – vocal arrangements
