= Benita Washington =

Benita Jones
- Born: Benita Jones; April 23, 1976 (age 50); Selma, Alabama
- Origin: Nashville, Tennessee
- Genres: gospel, christian, urban contemporary gospel
- Occupations: Singer, songwriter, worship leader, worship pastor
- Instruments: vocals, singer, songwriter
- Years active: 2004–present
- Labels: Light, ReddApple Seed Entertainment, Shanachie, Integrity, Tyscot
- Website: benitajones.com

Benita Jones (formally known as Benita Jones Washington) (born April 23, 1976) is an American gospel musician, recording artist, singer, songwriter, and worship leader. She (B. Washington) started her music career, in 2004, with the release of Hold On by Light Records. This album was her breakthrough on the Billboard magazine charts, debuting at number 6 on the Gospel Albums chart. Since her debut album in 2004, Jones has released four more projects to date.

Her current album "The Entreating" is a body a work full of original praise and worship songs co-written and co-produced by Jones.

Jones currently resides in Atlanta, GA where she is serving as worship pastor at her local church.

== Early life ==
Jones was born on April 23, 1976, in Selma, Alabama, as Benita Jones. She went to the University of Alabama, in Tuscaloosa, AL, where she studied Voice Performance. She won the Gospel Dream contest in Atlanta, Georgia in July 2003 which propelled her individual musical career.

== Music career ==
Her music career started in 2004, with the release of Hold On, by Light Records on July 13, 2004. Her career debut single "Thank You" would be her breakthrough release. Garnering her Billboard magazine placement on the Gospel Albums at No. 6 and at the No. 35 position on the Independent Albums chart. She was also nominated for the Soul Train Lady Of Soul award in the Best Gospel Album category. As a background vocalist for CeCe Winans, Donnie McClurkin and Juanita Bynum, she broke through as a featured artist on a national CeCe Winans tour.

She released her subsequent album, Renaissance-Live in Nashville, with ReddApple Seed Entertainment on February 13, 2007. The album would chart on the Gospel Albums chart at No. 17. Her third album, The Word Remains, was released by Shanachie Records on June 29, 2010.

Partnered with Integrity Music and Tyscot Records, Benita released her fifth project, "The Entreating" July 10, 2020.

Benita served as Worship Leader and Overseer of Worship at Mount Zion Baptist Church Nashville, TN for 15 years.

== Personal life ==
Jones married Delvin Washington in 2001 and later divorced in 2017. They have two children together.

== Discography ==
=== Albums ===
List of studio albums, with selected chart positions
| Title | Album details | Peak chart positions | |
| Title | Album details | US Gos | US Indie |
|---|---|---|---|
| Hold On | Released: July 13, 2004; Label: Light/Tehillah; Live; CD, digital download; Artist Name: Benita Washington | 6 | 35 |
| Renaissance (Live in Nashville) | Released: February 13, 2007; Label: ReddApple Seed Entertainment; Live; CD, digital download; Artist Name: Benita Washington | 17 | – |
| The Word Remains | Released: June 29, 2010; Label: Shanachie; Studio; CD, digital download; Artist Name: Benita Washington | – | – |
| The Evolution-EP | Released: January 19, 2018; Label: BSides Music (independent); Live; CD, digital download; Artist Name: Benita Jones | | |
| The Entreating (Live) | Released: July 10, 2020; Label: Integrity Music; Live; Digital download; Artist Name: Benita Jones | | |

== Chart position ==
2020 "Good God"

#7 Billboard Gospel Digital Songs
#30 Billboard Gospel Airplay
#29 Mediabase Gospel Airplay

2004 "Thank You" (Light Records)

#3 Hot Gospel Songs

ALBUMS AS BENITA JONES 2018 "The Evolution" (B Sides)

#3 Billboard Gospel Album Sales

ALBUMS AS BENITA WASHINGTON 2007 "Renaissance" (ReddApple Seed)

#17 Top Gospel Albums

2004 "Hold On" (Light Records)

#6 Top Gospel Albums
#1 Heat Seekers- Mountain
