= Spreadin' Like Wildfire =

Studio album by The Archers
- Released: 1981
- Recorded: MCA Whitney Studios, Glendale, California, 1981
- Genre: Christian
- Label: Songbird/MCA
- Producer: Dony McGuire

The Archers chronology
The Lord's Prayer (1980)	Spreadin' Like Wildfire (1981)	Here Comes The King (1983)

Spreadin’ Like Wildfire (see 1981 in music) was The Archers' only album released on MCA.

At the Grammy Awards of 1981, Spreadin' Like Wildfire was nominated for the Grammy Award for Best Gospel Performance, Contemporary. The Archers performed George Ratzlaff's "Everyday I've Got To Sing Some" on the Grammy Awards.

== Title list ==
1. "Spreadin' Like Wildfire" (Hal and Rachel Newman) 4:01
2. "I Never Knew Love" (Reba Rambo - Dony McGuire) 4:02
3. "Sooner of Later" (Steve Archer - Reba Rambo) 4:22
4. "Back in Your Arms" (Tim Archer) 4:45
5. "Everyday I've Got To Sing Some" (George Ratzlaff) 4:11
6. "Runnin' Too Long" (Tim Archer - Reba Rambo) 4:13
7. "Care" (Steve Archer - Dan Cutrona) 4:33
8. "Nothing Can Separate Us" (Reba Rambo - Dony McGuire) 4:15
9. "Merry-Go-Round" (Steve Archer) 5:19
10. "Never Say Goodbye" (Bruce Hibbard) 3:53

== Personnel ==
- Larrie Londin and Alex Acuña - drums and percussion
- Abraham Laboriel – bass
- Shane Keister and Dony McGuire – synthesizers
- Hadley Hockensmith - electric guitars
- Bill Kenner – mandolin
- Tony Sena - electric overdubs on "Merry-Go-Round" and "Never Say Goodbye."
- Strings by the Shelly Kurland Strings: Sheldon Kurland, George Binkley, John David Boyle, Marvin D. Chantry, Roy Christensen, Conni L. Ellisor, Carl J. Gorodetzky, Lennie Haight, Dennis W. Molchan, James R. Skipper, Samuel Terranova, Gary Vanasdale
- Horns: Dennis Solee (sax solos), Buddy Skipper, George Tidwell, Roger Bissell.
- Piano and Rhodes - Dan Cutrona

=== Production ===
- Produced by Dony McGuire
- Track and vocal arrangements by Dony McGuire
- Strings and horns arranged by Buddy Skipper
- Recording and mixing engineers - Warren Peterson and George Michael Psanos
- Recorded at MCA Whitney Studios, Glendale, California
- Vocal overdubs recorded by Willie Harlan at IAM, Irvine, California
- Remixed at Sound Stage Studios, Nashville, Tennessee
- Mastered by Steve Hall at MCA Whitney Mastering Studios, Glendale, California
- Photography by Bob Duffy
- Art direction by George Osaki
- Design by Randy Moses
