= 14th GMA Dove Awards =

1983 US music awards ceremony

- Date: 1983
- Location: Nashville, Tennessee

The 14th Annual GMA Dove Awards were held on 1983 recognizing accomplishments of musicians for the year 1982. The show was held in Nashville, Tennessee.

== Award recipients ==
- Song of the Year
  - "El Shaddai"; Michael Card, John Thompson; Whole Armor Publishing (ASCAP)
- Songwriter of the Year
  - Michael Card
- Male Vocalist of the Year
  - Larnelle Harris
- Female Vocalist of the Year
  - Sandi Patty
- Group of the Year
  - The Imperials
- Artist of the Year
  - Amy Grant
- Southern Gospel Album of the Year
  - Feeling at Home; Rex Nelon Singers; Ken Harding; Canaan Records
- Inspirational Album of the Year
  - Lift Up the Lord; Sandi Patti; Greg Nelson, Impact
- Pop/Contemporary Album of the Year
  - Age to Age; Amy Grant; Brown Bannister; Myrrh Records
- Inspirational Black Gospel Album of the Year
  - Touch Me Lord; Larnelle Harris, Greg Nelson; Impact
- Contemporary Gospel Album of the Year (formerly Contemporary Black Gospel)
  - I'll Never Stop Lovin' You; Leon Patillo; Skip Konte; Myrrh
- Traditional Gospel Album of the Year (formerly Traditional Black Gospel)
  - Precious Lord; Al Green; Al Green; Myrrh
- Instrumentalist
  - Dino Kartsonakis
- Praise and Worship Album of the Year
  - Light Eternal; Billy Ray Hearn; Birdwing
- Children's Music Album of the Year
  - Lullabies and Nursery Rhymes; Tony Salerno, Fletch Wiley; Birdwing
- Musical Album
  - The Day He Wore My Crown; David T. Clydesdale; Impact
- Recorded Music Packaging of the Year
  - Dennis Hill, Michael Borum; Age to Age; Amy Grant
- Album by a Secular Artist
  - He Set My Life to Music; Barbara Mandrell; Tom Collins; MCA
