= Whisper Loud =

American Christian pop group

- Origin: Seiling, Oklahoma, United States
- Genres: Christian pop
- Years active: 1997–2005
- Labels: Benson
- Past members: Tessa Gaskill; Keri Blumer; Alana Carris

Different Kind of Beautiful

Studio album by Whisper Loud
- Released: December 5, 2000
- Genre: Christian pop
- Length: 42:52
- Label: Benson
- Producer: Mark Hammond

Professional ratings
Review scores
Source	Rating
Contemporary Christian music	Positive
Cross Rhythms	8/10 stars

Whisper Loud was a Christian girl pop group, which formed in Seiling, Oklahoma, in 1997, and marketed as a Christian alternative to Spice Girls and Britney Spears.

Whisper Loud released one album, Different Kind of Beautiful, on December 5, 2000. On March 1, 2001, the group performed in Tulsa, Oklahoma for the Amazing Pop Invasion tour premiere, a 30-city event headlined by Raze. The tour also featured Tammy Trent, British DJ Doug Ross and fellow pop girl group Aurora. However, Whisper Loud dropped out of the tour after Raze frontman Ja'Marc Davis was arrested that night for raping teen girls in 1998. The remainder of the tour was cancelled after a March 6, 2001 concert, which also omitted Davis.

Despite this setback, the girl group later performed at several other venues before disbanding in 2005.

== Track listing ==
1. "Different Kind of Beautiful" – 3:52
2. "That's Alright With Me" – 3:48
3. "I Will Carry Your Pain" – 4:14
4. "Like a Circle" – 3:50
5. "If This Is What It Means" – 3:38
6. "Hey Yeah You" – 4:06
7. "Count The Ways" – 4:04
8. "All This Time" – 3:38
9. "All the Love In This World" – 3:28
10. "God Loves You" – 4:07
11. "If This Is What It Means" – 4:07
