= The Rambos =

American Southern gospel music group

- Also known as: The Gospel Echoes; The Singing Rambos
- Origin: Dawson Springs, Kentucky, United States
- Genres: Southern gospel, Christian
- Years active: 1964–1979
- Label: Heart Warming

The Rambos were an American Southern gospel music group that was formed in the 1960s. They were one of the most successful Gospel trios of the 20th century. The group consisted of Buck and Dottie Rambo at first along with several various people singing with them and they were joined by their daughter, Reba, and son, John, in 1965. They were a successful singing trio born out of the United Pentecostal Church. They were inducted into the Gospel Music Association's Hall of Fame in 2001.

== Group history ==
They signed their first record deal with Benson Records in 1964, after leaving their home in Dawson Springs, Kentucky and ending up in Nashville, Tennessee. Most singers and songwriters would have agreed without hesitation to such a deal with Benson Records, but Dottie wanted to make sure it was the will of God. Without telling anyone else, she prayed that if the deal was God's will, let the contract be for "so many dollars . . . PLUS 13-CENTS" The day the contract was to be signed, they were taken to the office of John T. Benson Jr. where the document was handed to Buck, who handled the group's business dealings. After he read the document, he asked Dottie if she wanted to see it. She said she only wanted to see the "bottom line" – the contract amount. Handing her the document, Buck teased her saying that she was only interested in the money. In a sense, she was. When she saw the amount, the "13-cents" she had asked the Lord to affirm that the deal was His will. In the beginning, the Rambos went by the name of the Gospel Echoes. It was not until Reba joined the group at the age of 12 that they changed their name to the Singing Rambos. Their style of singing has been described as "a harmonic blend of Buck's country-style singing and Dottie's mountain-style black soul music."

The Rambos are known for their three-part harmony. They sang what many called "inverted harmony," which in the music field was not proper or accepted because all groups were supposed to have a bass singer. It was not until they performed one night at the Ryman Auditorium with a group called the Sons of Song that they realized that they could have a successful group without the use of a bass singer. The group went on to become pioneers in the inverted style of singing.

Buck and Dottie were divorced in the mid-1990s. Afterwards, Dottie continued to minister at churches and concerts across the nation and write and record music until her death in 2008.

On May 11, 2008, Dottie Rambo died in a tour bus accident on Interstate 44 just outside Mount Vernon, Missouri. Rambo was on a successful concert tour and her manager and staff were also injured but she was the only fatality.

Richard Fay "Buck" Rambo, died February 21, 2016, in Palmetto, Florida, at the age of 84.

Apart from the Rambos, Reba had a successful solo career in contemporary Christian music, and continues to write and record. She is a Grammy Award winner and multiple Dove Award winner.

== Members ==
- Dottie Rambo (vocals, lead guitar, d. 2008)
- Buck Rambo (vocals, guitar, d. 2016)
- Reba Rambo (vocals, bass guitar, 1965–1979)
- Shirley Cohron (vocals, accordion)
- Joe Hatfield (vocals, piano)
- Pat Jones (vocals, piano, accordion, bass 1965–1967)
- Patty Carpenter (vocals)

=== Band musicians ===
- Darius Spurgeon (piano, 1967–1968)
- Kenny Parker (piano)
- Kenny Hicks (bass guitar)
- David Huntsinger (piano, 1976–1979)
- Dony McGuire (piano)

== Discography ==
- 1964: There's Nothing My God Can't Do (Heart Warming)
- 1964: Singing Rambos (Vista Records)
- 1965: Those Singing Rambos (Heart Warming)
- 1966: Come Spring (Heart Warming)
- 1967: The Soul Singing Rambos (Heart Warming)
- 1967: Gospel Ballads (Heart Warming)
- 1968: If That Isn't Love (Vista)
- 1968: An Evening With The Rambos (Heart Warming)
- 1969: The Soul Singing Rambos (Heart Warming)
- 1969: This Is My Valley (Heart Warming)
- 1970: The Real Thing (Heart Warming)
- 1970: Nashville Gospel (Heart Warming)
- 1970: Live
- 1971: Soul Classics (Heart Warming)
- 1971: Rambo Reflections (Heart Warming)
- 1971: Songs Of Love And Hope (Vista)
- 1971: If That Isn't Love (Vista)
- 1972: Soul In The Family (Heart Warming)
- 1972: The Best Of The Rambos (Heart Warming)
- 1972: Buck, Dottie And Reba (Vista)
- 1973: Sing Me On Home (Heart Warming)
- 1973: Spotlighting The Rambos (Vista)
- 1973: Belief (Vista)
- 1973: Sonshine (Heart Warming)
- 1973: Too Much to Gain to Lose (Vista)
- 1974: Yours, Until He Comes (Heart Warming)
- 1974: Alive and Live at Souls Harbor (Heart Warming)
- 1975: There Has To Be A Song (Heart Warming)
- 1975: These Three Are One (Heart Warming)
- 1975: Christmas at Our House (compilation) "Oh Holy Night" (Impact)
- 1976: The Son Is Shining (Heart Warming)
- 1976: Rambo Country (Heart Warming)
- 1977: Naturally (Heart Warming)
- 1978: Queen of Paradise (Heart Warming)
- 1979: Silver Jubilee (Heart Warming)
- 1979: Crossin' Over (Heart Warming)
- 1981: Rambo Reunion (Heart Warming)
- 1983: Memories Made New (Heart Warming)
- 1992: Masters of Gospel (Riversong)
- 1992: Lost Recordings of The Rambos/Gospel Echoes
- 1992: 20 Gospel Classics (Riversong)
- 1992: The Very Best Of The Rambos (New Haven)

=== Appearances on other albums ===
- 1974: Highway Call – Richard (Dickey) Betts (of The Allman Bros.) (Capricorn) (also on The Allman Bros. Dreams CD Box Set – 1989)
