= Keep Singing That Love Song =

Keep Singin' That Love Song

Studio album by The Archers
- Released: 1974
- Genre: Christian rock
- Label: Impact

The Archers chronology
The Archers (1973)	Keep Singin' That Love Song (1974)	Things We Deeply Feel (1975)

Keep Singin' That Love Song was The Archers first major label album. Impact Records re-released their independent recording, The Archers, a year earlier and sent master producer Bob MacKenzie to the West Coast for the new project. The album included the Number One hit, “Little Flowers” and “Jesus, He Is The Son Of God”. Paul Revere and The Raiders’ arranger, Bobby Sisco who would meet an untimely death during the recording of the group’s Things We Deeply Feel project one year later, arranged the album’s rhythm and orchestration. Musicians included Derek and the Dominos’ drummer Jim Gordon and Steely Dan regular Ben Benay. The Archers moved on to Ralph Carmichael’s Light Records shortly after its release, where they would remain for most of the following decade.

== Track listing ==
=== Side One ===
1. "Keep Singin' That Love Song" – 2:50
2. "Truth, Peace and Joy" – 3:21
3. "He Washed My Sins Away" – 2:34
4. "Children" – 3:11
5. "Jesus (He Is The Son Of God)" – 3:00

=== Side Two ===
1. "Thank You, Lord Jesus" – 3:51
2. "Little Flowers" – 4:16
3. "Soul Down" – 3:00
4. "He Loves You" – 2:42
5. "There Is A Light" – 3:38
