= Billy Rush Masters =

American musician

Billy Rush Masters (September 15, 1950 – July 2, 1981) was an American composer, and rock guitarist. He is best known as a songwriter and founding member of the pioneering Jesus music and contemporary Christian music band, the Archers between 1970 and 1977. His hits included “God’s Love,””Into Me,” “Thank You Lord Jesus,” “Music (He Brings A New Song),” “Brand New Day,” and “Fresh Surrender,” which was nominated for a GMA Dove Award in 1977.

He was born William Rush Masters at St. Francis Hospital in Wichita, Kansas to Allan Rush Masters an aerospace engineer and Marjorie Suzanne Schuelke. He has one sibling, Pamela Masters Guzman. He grew up in the San Francisco Bay Area community of Mountain View, California during the 1960s. He graduated from Los Altos High School and attended Foothill College in Los Altos, California. Masters showed an early aptitude for music. He began playing guitar at age five and by high school he was teaching and had already formed a couple of rock bands. He was an early member of San Francisco’s Hippie movement and began to study Eastern religions.

In 1969, after a move to Palmdale, California he became a born-again Christian. There he met the singers Tim and Steve Archer who were forming the Jesus and contemporary Christian music band, The Archers. He began playing bass and later switched to lead. By 1972, The Archers recorded their first album, Any Day Now. Within six months they landed a record deal with Impact Records, Nashville who re-released the album as The Archers.

Masters toured with the group throughout the United States, Canada and South Africa for six years before leaving the band in 1976. He married Judy Baxter, a law student and engineer at NBC who worked on various shows including the daytime drama, Days of Our Lives, Sanford & Son, The Tonight Show Starring Johnny Carson doing the boom, working as an audio assistant, or operating the teleprompter. During his years with the Archers he contributed songs to four albums: The Archers, Keep Singing That Love Song, Things We Deeply Feel and Fresh Surrender, writing an average of four songs per album.

He suffered from an autoimmune illness from early childhood, and was later diagnosed with a related form of hepatitis. In 1979, he began to hemorrhage and was rushed to the hospital losing nearly all of his blood volume. Although he initially recovered, he relapsed and was admitted to UCLA Medical Center. He died on July 2, 1981. He left behind his wife and one infant daughter, Lauren who went on to study musical theatre at USC and currently lives and works in Burlington Vt after spending 10 years in NYC. Lauren and her husband Stephen Scuderi are active in music and theater check out the music of Billy Masters on GuardianAngelMusic.com Judy Spees, Billy's wife and her now husband Frank Spees are trust attorneys. www.spees.com
