= Gary McSpadden =

American singer and songwriter (1943–2020)

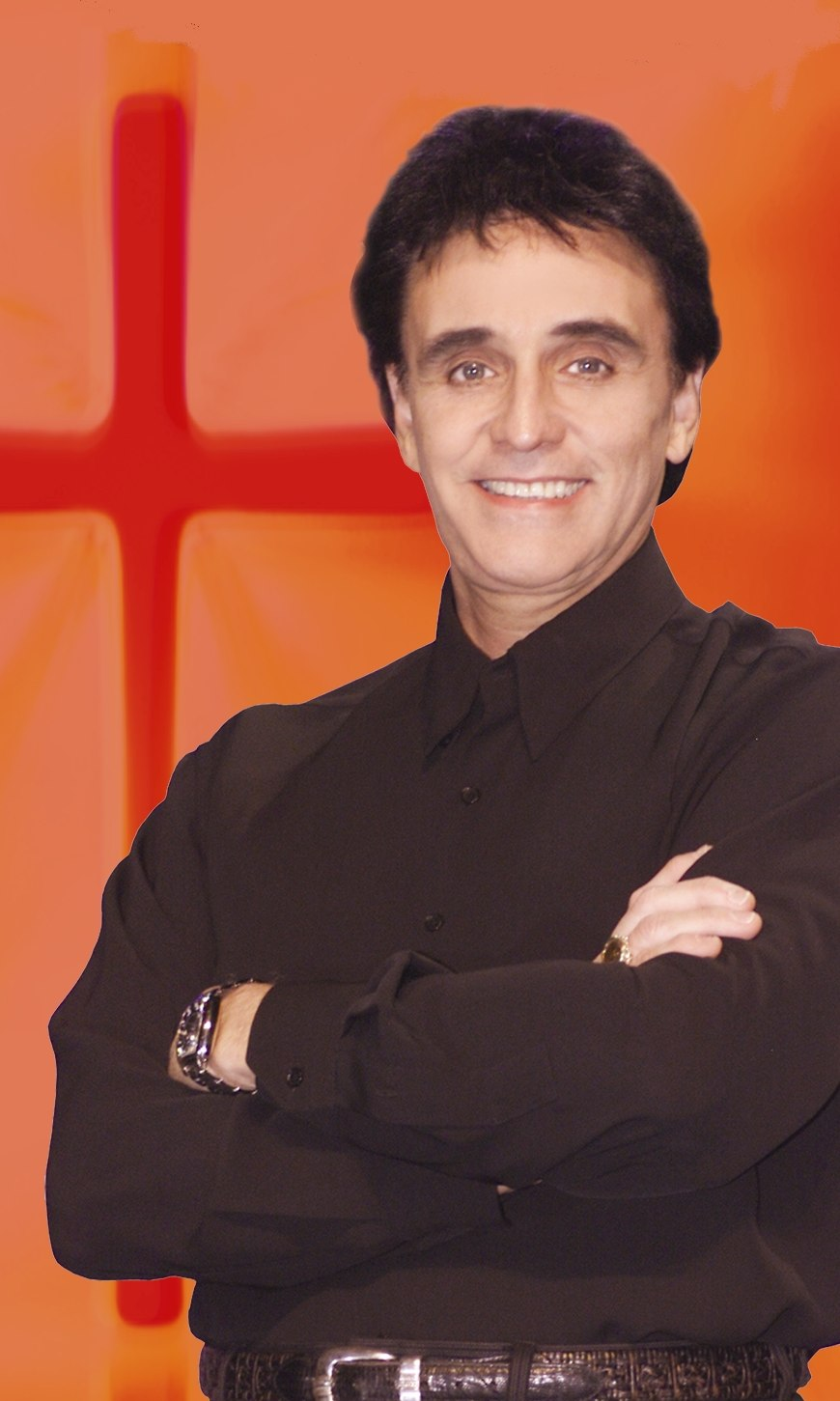

Background information
- Born: January 26, 1943; Mangum, Oklahoma, U.S.
- Died: April 15, 2020 (aged 77) Tulsa, Oklahoma, U.S.
- Genres: Christian, southern gospel, contemporary Christian
- Occupations: Singer, songwriter, record producer, pastor
- Years active: 1950s–2020
- Formerly of: Bill Gaither Trio, Gaither Vocal Band, the Imperials, the Oak Ridge Boys
- Website: www.garymcspadden.com

Gary McSpadden (January 26, 1943 – April 15, 2020) was an American pastor, singer, songwriter, record producer, television host and motivational speaker. He had musical roots in quartet music and Southern gospel with The Statesmen, the Oak Ridge Boys, the Imperials, the Bill Gaither Trio, and The Gaither Vocal Band. McSpadden's songs include "Jesus Lord To Me", "Hallelujah Praise The Lamb", and "No Other Name But Jesus". He has produced albums for numerous groups. In 1987, he co-hosted PTL Today after Jim Bakker resigned. McSpadden went on to produce television programs, including the "Jubilee" concert series filmed at Silver Dollar City in Branson, Missouri. He also produced and starred in several live music shows in the Branson area during the 1990s and 2000s.

== Early life ==
Gary McSpadden was born to Boyd and Helen McSpadden. The family later moved to Lubbock, Texas where Gary's father was pastor of Faith Temple. McSpadden grew up in a musical family. His mother and father were songwriters, and at least one of their songs, "Heaven", became popular after it was recorded by George Beverly Shea and others. As a young boy, McSpadden sang in the church and was singing solos by the age of ten.

== Career ==
=== Singer ===
In 1962, at the age of 18, McSpadden caught the attention of Hovie Lister, manager of The Statesmen, and sang with the group while lead singer Jake Hess was on medical leave. After five months, he was hired on with the Oak Ridge Quartet. During his time there, the group changed their name to The Oak Ridge Boys, and recorded three albums together.

From 1964 to 1967, McSpadden sang with Jake Hess and the Imperials. It was during his time with them that The Imperials first started singing backup to Elvis Presley.

In 1977, Mcspadden joined Bill And Gloria Gaither in The Bill Gaither Trio, replacing Danny Gaither. During this time, he was a co-pastor for three years, but stepped down by 1980 to focus whole-heartedly on music. In 1981, the Gaithers added a second group called The Gaither Vocal Band. McSpadden, Bill Gaither, Steve Green and Lee Young were the first members in the group.

McSpadden began his solo career in 1979 with his album Higher Purpose. He sang with the Gaither Vocal Band until 1988 when he left to devote more time towards his solo career.

McSpadden has recorded more than 30 albums, 16 of them solo.

=== Pastor ===
In 1967, McSpadden left the music ministry to pastor a large non-denominational church with his father in Fort Worth, Texas. The father/son team worked together for 13 years. He pastored Faith and Wisdom Church in Branson, Missouri, teaching faith, wisdom and obedience to the Bible.

=== Television and live music shows ===
Gary McSpadden had been broadcasting on television for years. In 1976, he and his father Boyd McSpadden aired a series of programs in Fort Worth, Texas from the church they pastored. Years later, Gary was an occasional guest on The PTL Club with Jim Bakker. After Bakker resigned from the show, McSpadden accepted an invitation to host the program and stayed on for six months.

In January 1999, McSpadden began to host a new live music show at Silver Dollar City called Gospel Jubilee. The show was recorded and broadcast on television every Sunday from January 2000 through January 2003. During the show, he featured an assortment of current popular Christian artists singing gospel favorites.

In 2003, McSpadden also starred in a live show with his brother-in-law Dino Kartsonakis titled the "Easter Spring Spectacular". This show was hosted every spring for four years at various theaters in Branson Missouri.

In 2004, McSpadden moved his live music show to the Americana Theater in Branson and changed the name to Southern Gospel Sundays. He continued to host a variety of current Christian artists at the new theater.

In the years to follow, McSpadden focused more on preaching and teaching the Gospel. The Gary McSpadden Show was broadcast on TCT (Total Christian Television). It still included various Christian artists along with segments by Gary teaching on subjects from the Bible. Today The Gary McSpadden Show focuses totally on the gospel with teachings from various messages. The show still includes a song from a visitor at Faith & Wisdom Church in Branson. It is broadcast on two satellite networks: TCT and GEB.

=== Producer ===
Gary McSpadden produced many Dove Award-winning recordings for the Bill Gaither Trio, the Cathedrals, The Gaither Vocal Band, Terri Gibbs, and the Talleys, Lulu Roman, and others.

== Death ==
McSpadden died on April 15, 2020, at the Cancer Center in Tulsa, Oklahoma, where he had been hospitalized for some weeks, having been diagnosed with pancreatic cancer earlier in 2020. He was transferred there from Cox Hospital in Springfield, Missouri, and before his death he suffered some severe complications including a stroke. He was buried in Woodlawn Cemetery in Nashville, TN, on April 21, 2020, near his parents, with a large memorial service at his Faith and Wisdom Church in Branson, MO.

== Awards and honors ==
McSpadden was inducted into the Gospel Music Association Hall of Fame in 1998, 1999 and 2000. He was also inducted into the Texas Gospel Music Hall Of Fame in 1989. It was announced on April 15th, 2025 (5 year anniversary of Garys passing), that he would be inducted into the Southern Gospel Music Associations Hall of Fame in September at the National Quartet Convention in Pigeon Forge, Tennessee!

== Discography ==
=== Solo albums ===
Year	Album	Record label
1965	Gary McSpadden	Superior
1966	How Green Is Your Valley	Sing Records
1975	Hallelujah Maranatha	Rainbow
1977	Unique	Rainbow
1979	Higher Purpose	Paragon Records
1981	It Was Enough	McSpadden Group
1984	Separate Journeys	Paragon
1986	Timeless	Ariose Music
1986	One Song, One Voice	Word, Incorporated
1987	The Best Of Gary McSpadden	Greentree
1988	Hymns from the Heart	McSpadden Group
1990	All-Time Favorites	McSpadden Group
1990	From My Soul	McSpadden Group
1993	Highest Praise	McSpadden Group
1999	Back Home Again	MAXX Music
2000	Southern Gospel Classics	McSpadden Group
2001	Familiar Places	Landmark
2002	Simply the Best of Gary McSpadden	McSpadden Group
2002	Great Hymns & Gospel Songs	Gary McSpadden
2007	Thank You	Gary McSpadden

=== Devotional albums ===
Year	Album title	Label
2001	Drive Time Devotions 1	Tyndale Audio
2001	Drive Time Devotions 2	Tyndale Audio
2001	Drive Time Devotions 3	Tyndale Audio
2002	Drive Time Devotions for Moms	Tyndale Audio
2002	Drive Time Devotions for Men	Tyndale Audio
2003	Drive Time Devotions 1	Word Entertainment LLC / Curb Records
2003	Drive Time Devotions for the Christmas Holidays	Word Entertainment LLC / Curb Records
2004	Drive Time Devotions 2	Word Entertainment LLC / Curb Records
2004	Drive Time Devotions for Kids	Word Entertainment LLC / Curb Records
2004	Drive Time Devotions for Moms	Word Entertainment LLC / Curb Records
2004	Drive Time Devotions for Men	Word Entertainment LLC / Curb Records
2012	Scriptures And Thoughts to Bring Healing	Gary McSpadden Ministries
