= Colors of Your Love =

Studio album by The Archers
- Released: 1991
- Genre: Christian
- Label: Reunion
- Producer: Jonathan David Brown

The Archers chronology
All Systems Are Go (1984)	Colors of Your Love (1991)

Colors of Your Love (1991) was the last album in The Archers' three decade-long recording career. Produced by veteran Jonathan David Brown for Reunion Records the album garnered the Top 20 hit, “Be Our Guest” and several more airplay favorites, securing their place as one of the handful of Christian artists to have topped the charts in each of three decades.

It was well received internationally as well one UK critic saying,

A track by track listing wouldn't do the album justice as there are more peaks than the Himalayas, with every track, yes every track, ministering in its own way. "Colors Of Your Love" and "Be Our Guest" have harmonies straight out of the Heavenly Host praise book and are superb worship songs. … You've really got to listen to it to believe just how classy this album is.

Billboard Magazine added, “The Archers have too much going for them to miss.”

== Track listing ==
- All Things
- I Love You Lord
- All Because You Love Me
- The Colors Of Your Love
- Run To You
- Music (all around the world)
- Back On Track
- Be Our Guest (Top 20 hit, 1991)
- Beneath Your Blood
- We Need Each Other
