= Benson Records =

American record label

- Parent company: Sony Music Entertainment
- Founded: 1902
- Founder: Bob Benson, John T. Benson
- Defunct: 2001
- Status: Defunct
- Distributor: Provident Label Group
- Genre: Christian
- Country of origin: United States
- Location: Nashville, Tennessee

Benson Records was founded by Bob Benson and John T. Benson, who formed the John T. Benson Music Publishing Company in 1902. The record label started out as Heart Warming Records, creating house labels such as Impact Records, Greentree Records, RiverSong, StarSong, Power Discs and Home Sweet Home. In the 1970s, Impact became the top label with artists such as New Dawn, the Imperials, J.D. Sumner & The Stamps Quartet, the Rambos, Dottie Rambo, the Archers, the Bill Gaither Trio, the Speer Family and Sandi Patty (her Impact catalog is owned by Curb Music).

== History ==
In 1980, Paragon Associates formed a partnership with Zondervan to own/operate Benson Records. Paragon Assoc. was founded in 1975, by Bob MacKenzie and Bill Gaither (gospel singer). Paragon sold its interest to Zondervan in 1983, where under the leadership of Bob Jones, Jr. saw the Benson company grow even bigger in the 1980s. Artists included Gold City, The Kingsmen Quartet, DeGarmo & Key, Dallas Holm, and others producing several hits.

In the 1980s, Benson Records continued with success by signing a contract to distribute a new label, founded by Dan R. Brock, Eddie DeGarmo, Dana Key and Ron W. Griffin. Forefront Records was born, and in 1989 Dc Talk was signed. In 1996, Forefront Records was sold to EMI (now Universal Music Group); this acquisition includes the entire DeGarmo & Key catalog. On July 27, 1993, Benson Music Group launched the Christian children's music series, Kids' Classics with the first six titles including Bible Songs, Action Bible Songs, Sunday School Songs, Songs of Praise, Silly Songs, and Lullabies. In 1994, the name Impact Records was sold to Landmark Distribution. On July 26, 1994, Benson Music Group released two new Kids' Classics including Toddler Tunes and Hymns. On November 1, 1994, Kids' Classics changed their name to Cedarmont Kids. In 1995, they acquired Diadem Music Group which included gospel-jazz pioneer Ben Tankard's Tribute Records label contracts. These contracts included Tankard, Yolanda Adams, Twinkie Clark and Bob Carlisle. Carlisle is best known for his hit song, "Butterfly Kisses".

Benson Records was sold to Bertelsmann AG via its Provident/Zomba in 1997, which is now a part of Sony Music Entertainment. The Benson label was reformatted to focus on new artists. Zomba closed the label in late 2001.

Most recently, the name Heart Warming Records and RiverSong was sold to Homeland Entertainment. Homeland is owned by Bill Traylor and former President of Zondervan, Bob Jones, Jr.

Benson's choral music printing business is now owned by the McAfee School of Theology and Townsend School of Music of Mercer University (dba Celebrating Grace), a Cooperative Baptist Fellowship institution, acquired its assets from Universal Music Group in 2023.

== Artists ==
- 4Him
- Yolanda Adams
- Angelo & Veronica
- The Archers
- Andrus, Blackwood & Co
- Ray Boltz
- Bridge
- Brush Arbor
- Bob Carlisle
- Commissioned
- Carman
- Cedarmont Kids
- Twinkie Clark
- DeGarmo & Key
- Bryan Duncan
- Gary Dunham
- East to West
- Farrell & Farrell
- Don Francisco
- Bill Gaither Trio
- Glad
- Gold City
- Fred Hammond
- Harvest
- Dallas Holm
- The Imperials
- Kingsmen Quartet
- Life Action Singers
- Oak Ridge Boys
- Sandi Patty
- Chuckie Perez
- Pilgrim Jubilees
- Dottie Rambo
- The Rambos
- Songfellows Quartet
- Speer Family
- Billy Sprague
- J.D. Sumner & The Stamps Quartet
- Straight Company
- Michael Sweet
- Tanya Goodman-Sykes
- Three Crosses
- Tourniquet
- Truth
- Hezekiah Walker
- Whisper Loud
- Thomas Whitfield
- J.C. White and the TFT Church Choir

== See also ==
- List of record labels

== Resources ==
- Powell, Mark Allan. The Encyclopedia of Contemporary Christian Music Hendrickson Publishers, August 2002. (ISBN 1565636791 ISBN 978-1-56563-679-8)
