= Gloria Gaither =

American musical artist

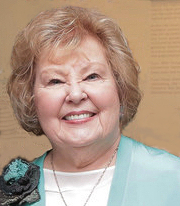
- Gloria in Sept. 2016

Background information
- Born: Gloria Lee Sickal; March 4, 1942 (age 84); Battle Creek, Michigan, U.S.
- Genres: Christian music, southern gospel, contemporary Christian
- Occupations: Songwriter (lyricist), author, screenwriter, speaker
- Instrument: Vocals
- Years active: 1962–present
- Formerly of: Bill Gaither Trio
- Spouse: Bill Gaither
- Website: www.gaither.com

Gloria Gaither (/ˈɡeɪθər/ GAY-thər; born March 4, 1942) is a Christian singer-songwriter, author, speaker, editor, and academic. She is married to Bill Gaither and together they have written more than 700 songs. In 2000, ASCAP named them Christian Songwriters of the Century. She performed, traveled and recorded with the Bill Gaither Trio from 1965 through 1991. Since 1991, she has served as a performer, recording artist, songwriter, scriptwriter and narrator for the Gaither Homecoming series of television broadcasts, video and DVD releases, and audio recordings.

== Early years ==
She was born Gloria Lee Sickal in 1942 in Michigan, a daughter of Pastor Lee Sickal and Dorothy Sickal. She spent some of her childhood and high school years in the Battle Creek area of Michigan, working a brief time for the Kellogg Company.

== Education ==
When Gloria graduated from Clare High School in Clare, Michigan, she attended Anderson University in Anderson, Indiana. There, she triple majored in English, French, and Sociology. Her extracurricular activities at the college included participation in the Drama Club, Alpha Chi honor society and Sigma Tau Delta honor society.

Upon her graduation, she took a job at Alexandria Monroe High School as a French teacher. There, she met Bill Gaither, who was teaching English at the time. She married Gaither in 1962, and they began writing songs recreationally.

In 1991, she attended Ball State University and received a Master of Arts in British and American Literature.

== Career ==
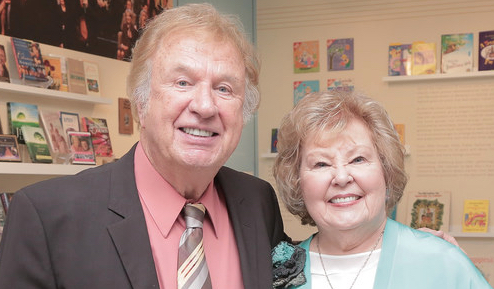
Bill & Gloria Gaither pose for a picture in September 2016

Bill and Gloria Gaither began writing songs in the 1960s, and many of those songs (including "Because He Lives", "I Am Loved", "Something Beautiful") would go on to become church hymn book standards across North America and around the world. By the end of the 1960s, Gloria, Bill, and Bill's brother Danny Gaither were touring steadily as the Bill Gaither Trio, singing and recording songs Bill and Gloria had written. After touring with the Bill Gaither Trio for nearly thirty years, Gaither drew her focus to the Gaither Homecoming series. She has been an active presence in every video production.

In 1996, she spearheaded the creation of Gaither Family Resources in Alexandria, Indiana, and currently serves as co-owner and managing director. In 2002, Gaither launched Homecoming: The Magazine, and she currently acts as writer, interviewer, and contributing editor.

In 2000, Bill and Gloria were named Christian Songwriters of the Century by the American Society of Composers, Authors and Publishers (ASCAP), an award based on the songwriters who have had the most songs recorded over the past 100 years. Gloria is the recipient of seven honorary doctorate degrees, and she is the author of more than 40 books including 20 children's books.

== Awards and honors ==
- Grammy Awards (National Academy of Recording Arts & Sciences)
  - 1973: Best Inspirational Performance, "Let's Just Praise The Lord", Bill Gaither Trio
  - 1975: Best Inspirational Performance, "Jesus, We Just Want to Thank You", Bill Gaither Trio
  - 1999: Southern, Country or Bluegrass Gospel Album: Kennedy Center Homecoming – Bill and Gloria Gaither and Their Homecoming Friends
  - 2001: Best Southern, Country or Bluegrass Gospel Album: Bill & Gloria Gaither Present a Billy Graham Music Homecoming Bill & Gloria Gaither and the Homecoming Friends
  - 2002: Southern, Country or Bluegrass Gospel Album, "A Billy Graham Music Homecoming", Bill and Gloria Gaither
- GMA Dove Awards (Gospel Music Association)
  - 1976: Inspirational Album of the Year, Jesus, We Just Want to Thank You, Bill Gaither Trio
  - 1978: Inspirational Album of the Year, Pilgrim's Progress, Bill Gaither Trio
  - 1980: Mixed Group of the Year, Bill Gaither Trio
  - 1981: Gospel Album of the Year, Children's Music, The Very Best of the Very Best, For Kids, Bill Gaither Trio
  - 1982: Children's Music Album of the Year, Kids Under Construction, Bill and Gloria Gaither, Ronn Huff and Joy MacKenzie
  - 1985: Song of the Year: "Upon This Rock", Gloria Gaither and Dony McGuire
  - 1986: Songwriter of the Year, Gloria Gaither
  - 1988: Song of the Year: "In the Name of the Lord", Phil McHugh, Gloria Gaither and Sandi Patti Helvering, River Oaks Music, Gaither Music, Sandi's Songs
  - 1993: Southern Gospel Album: Reunion: A Gospel Homecoming Celebration, Bill Gaither, Gloria Gaither
  - 1994: Lifetime Achievement Award, The Gaither Companies
  - 1999: Induction into the Gospel Music Hall of Fame, Bill Gaither Trio
  - 1999: Southern Gospel Recorded Song of the Year, "I Believe In A Hill Called Mount Calvary"; Gaither Vocal Band (performer); Bill and Gloria Gaither (writers)
  - 2002: Induction into the Gospel Music Hall of Fame, in recognition of past and continuing efforts to promote the furtherance of quality gospel music in the world today
  - 2007: Southern Gospel Recorded Song of the Year, "Give It Away", Gaither Vocal Band, music: Benjamin Gaither, lyrics: Gloria Gaither
- Academic Awards
  - 2002: Indiana Academy Induction, in recognition of outstanding individuals for service and accomplishments, Independent Colleges of Indiana Foundation
  - 2002: Honorary Doctorate of Humane Letters Indiana Wesleyan University recipient
  - 2010: Honorary Doctorate of Arts, Taylor University
  - 2011: Honorary Alumni Degree, Olivet Nazarene University
  - 2012: Honorary Doctorate of Music, Nyack College
- Other Awards & Honors
  - 1997: Inducted into the GMA Hall of Fame
  - 2002: Cherub Award, to honor those who have made outstanding contributions within the area of worship, International Worship Institute
  - 2003: American Inspiration Award, Presidential Prayer Team
  - 2005: Southern Gospel Music Hall of Fame Induction
  - 2006: Living Legends Award, Indiana Historical Society
  - 2008: ASCAP Award of Merit, Song of the Year Nominee to Bill and Gloria Gaither for "I Am Loved"
  - 2008: Indiana Broadcasters Association & Indiana Broadcast Pioneers Hall of Fame Induction, Bill and Gloria Gaither
  - 2008: Christian Music Publishers Association Founder's Award, presented for song, "Something Beautiful"
  - 2008: Sachem Award: Indiana's highest honor, selected by the Indiana governor, awarded to Hoosiers for a lifetime of excellence and virtue that has brought honor to Indiana.
  - 2010: Indiana Wesleyan University Society of World Changers
  - 2026: Pillar Award for Impact: Museum of the Bible
  - 2026: Gaither Studio dedication at Taylor University
