= Three Crosses (band) =

American Christian rock band

Three Crosses was an American Christian southern rock band from New Jersey, formed in 1994 by two friends who had played together since middle school. Their first album, a self-titled release, was produced by Barry Beckett and featured guitar by Anthony Krizan of the Spin Doctors. The group had several songs which received airplay on Christian radio; "Seven Days", "God's House", "Calvary", "Stone Was Rolled Away", "Michelangelo", and "Bring Me to My Knees" all reached the Top 20 of the Christian Hit Radio chart between 1995 and 1997. Two of the group's albums made the Billboard Christian music chart.

== Members ==
- Steve Pasch
- Ralph Barrientos
- Ed Nicholson

== Discography ==
- Three Crosses (Benson Records, 1995) U.S. Christian No. 30
- Jefferson Street (Benson, 1996) U.S. Christian No. 19
- Skinny Flowers (Benson, 1998)
- 100% Saved: The Best of Three Crosses (Benson, 1999)
- Live At Flevo (Spark Music, 1999)
