= Gary Dunham =

American songwriter

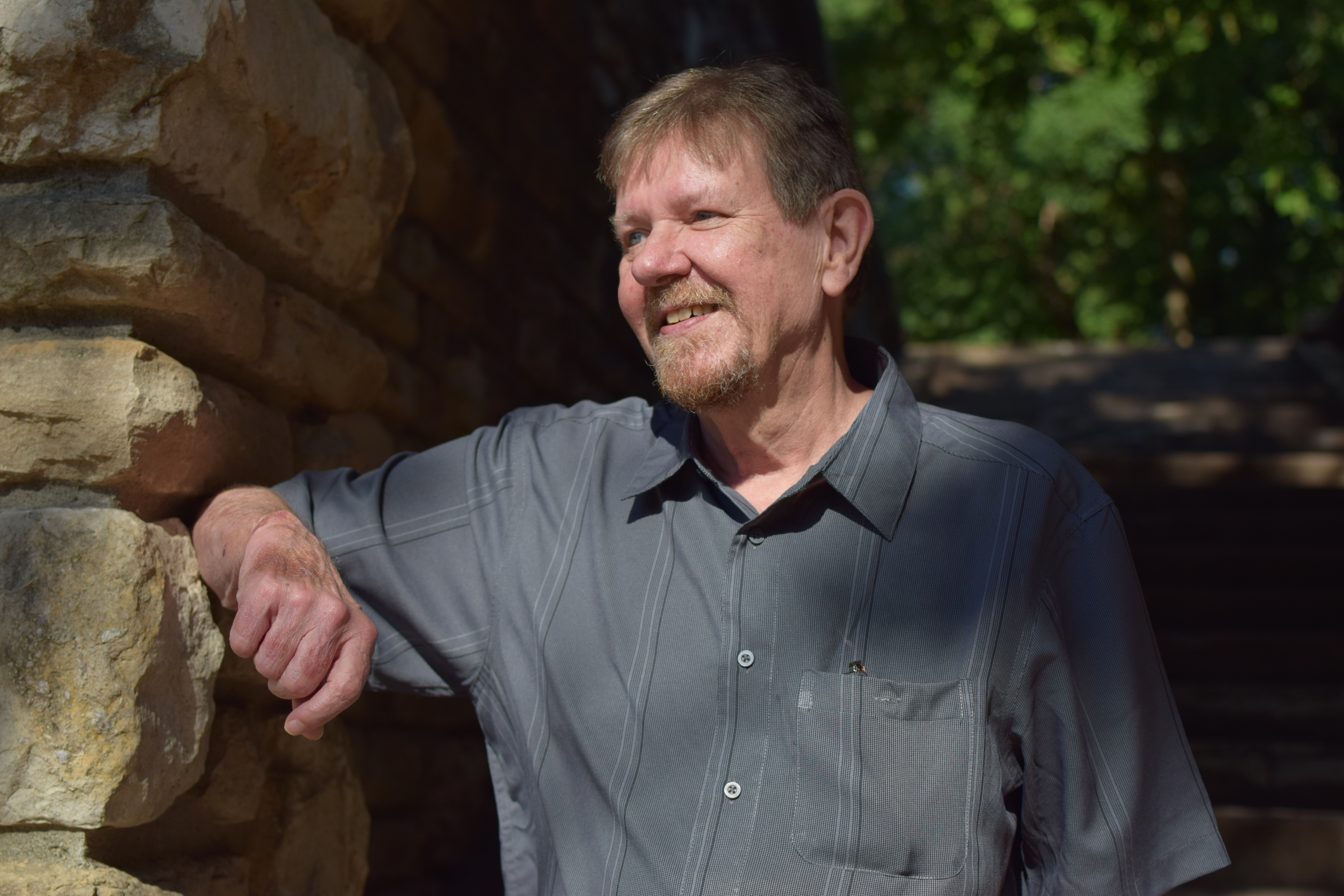
Gary Dunham, 2018

Gary Dunham (March 25, 1951 - May 30, 2026) was an American contemporary Christian recording artist. He played professionally since the late 1960s. In addition to solo albums, he wrote songs for many other artists including Kathy Troccoli, Sandi Patty and the Gaither Vocal Band. He was active in several musical genres including gospel, country and rock.

== Early life and early career ==
Dunham was born in St. Joseph, Missouri, to Harry and Wanda Dunham. He began performing in local groups as a teenager. A 2004 retrospective on the St. Joseph music scene listed Dunham as lead singer, accordionist, and keyboardist for the Safaris, a local band active from the late 1960s into the early 1970s. The article also stated that after the Safaris disbanded, Dunham joined the Rosemary DeHart Trio.

A 1978 profile in the St. Joseph News-Press reported that Dunham moved to Los Angeles in 1973, where he organized a rock band and continued writing music. In 1975, Dunham toured with the final incarnation of the Los Angeles rock group Blues Image, best known for its 1970 hit "Ride Captain Ride". A June 1975 article in the Fredericksburg Standard identified Dunham as the group's keyboardist and lead singer during a national tour. That same year, Blues Image released the single "I Found You" on Nice Records, with the song credited to Dunham.

== Contemporary Christian music ==
By the late 1970s, Dunham and Rosemary Dunham had returned to St. Joseph and were performing original gospel songs together. The St. Joseph News-Press reported in 1978 that their original material included "Happy Family".

In July 1980, Christian Life profiled Dunham in its "People on the Move" section, describing him as a recording artist and identifying "Happy Family" as his first single release on Paragon.

Dunham's self-titled debut album, Gary Dunham, was released by NewPax Records in 1980. A review in Contemporary Christian Music described the album as a mellow contemporary Christian release and noted that Gary and Rosemary Dunham co-wrote each of its songs. The album was recorded in Nashville and produced by Randy Cox, with string arrangements by Shane Keister and horn arrangements by Don Hart.

In March 1981, Contemporary Christian Music published a feature profile of Dunham titled "The Story of A 'Happy Family' Man". The article reported that "Happy Family" had been released to radio and Christian bookstores and had reached the top of the charts, leading to additional bookings and plans for a second album. Hot Hits: Christian Hit Radio lists "Happy Family" as entering the CCM Contemporary Hits chart on October 15, 1980, peaking at No. 1 on May 26, 1981, and spending 49 weeks on the chart.

Dunham's second solo album, The Pearl, was released by NewPax Records in 1982 and produced by Buzz Cason. The title track, written by Gary and Rosemary Dunham, entered the CCM Contemporary Hits chart on March 30, 1983, peaked at No. 24 on May 11, 1983, and spent three weeks on the chart. In 2017, Cross Rhythms writer Tony Cummings included "The Pearl" in his "Spirit of Rock and Soul" series and recalled first hearing the song when Dunham accompanied Don Francisco on a United Kingdom tour in the mid-1980s.

== Work with Don Francisco and other artists ==
Dunham performed in connection with Don Francisco's concerts during the early 1980s. In 1981, The Tampa Tribune reported that Dunham opened for Francisco at a sold-out Tampa concert, accompanied himself on piano, and performed for an hour plus an encore before Francisco's set. A 1982 Great Falls Tribune review of a Francisco concert identified Dunham as a pianist and backup musician.

Dunham was credited with keyboards and background vocals on Francisco's 1982 album The Live Concert. By 1985, Dunham had joined Francisco's touring band as a keyboardist. A St. Joseph News-Press article that year identified Dunham as a local member of Francisco's group and noted that songs from The Pearl were receiving airplay on St. Joseph Christian radio station K.G.N.M.

Dunham also collaborated with Francisco as a songwriter. "One Heart at a Time", the title track from Francisco's 1985 album One Heart at a Time, was co-written by Gary Dunham and Don Francisco.

In addition to his solo recordings and work with Francisco, Dunham wrote or co-wrote songs recorded by other contemporary Christian artists. His songwriting credits included "Somebody Believed", recorded by Sandi Patty on Love Overflowing, and "Once in a Lifetime Love", recorded by Kathy Troccoli on Stubborn Love. Gary and Rosemary Dunham also wrote "Have You Made Your Reservation?", which appeared on the Gaither Vocal Band's 1981 debut album The New Gaither Vocal Band and was included in the matching vocal solo/piano accompaniment songbook.

== Later work ==
Dunham continued writing and sharing music in later years. His later songs were made available through TuneTrax, including "Appalachian Rain". The song was later recorded by Stacy Grubb for her 2009 album Hurricane, with Apple Music crediting Gary Dunham as the writer.

== Death ==
Dunham died on May 30, 2026, at the age of 75.

== Discography ==
=== Studio albums ===
- Winterspring - Winterspring (private pressing, 1970)
- Gary Dunham - Gary Dunham (NewPax, 1980)
- The Pearl - Gary Dunham (NewPax, 1982; produced by Buzz Cason)

=== Singles ===
- "I Found You" / "Coming Down" - Blues Image (Nice Records, 1975)
- "Happy Family" - Gary Dunham (Paragon/NewPax, 1980)
- "The Pearl" - Gary Dunham (NewPax, 1982)

=== Selected songwriting and musician credits ===
- "Somebody Believed" - Sandi Patty, Love Overflowing (1981), songwriter
- "Have You Made Your Reservation?" - Gaither Vocal Band, The New Gaither Vocal Band (1981), songwriter
- The Live Concert - Don Francisco (1982), keyboards and background vocals
- "Once in a Lifetime Love" - Kathy Troccoli, Stubborn Love (1982), songwriter
- Holiness - Don Francisco (1984), piano, organ, and background vocals
- "One Heart at a Time" - Don Francisco, One Heart at a Time (1985), songwriter
- "Appalachian Rain" - Stacy Grubb, Hurricane (2009), songwriter
