= Steve Archer =

American singer-songwriter and producer

- Born: January 5, 1953 (age 73); Mojave, California, United States
- Genre: Contemporary Christian music

Steve Archer (born January 5, 1953) is an American singer-songwriter and producer. He is a pioneer of the genre of Jesus music, later to become known as contemporary Christian music. He is the former lead singer of the Archers, a contemporary Christian music and Jesus music band who toured and recorded throughout the decades of the 1970s, 1980s, and 1990s.

== Biography ==
Born Stephen Mark Archer in Mojave, California, US, the son of an Assemblies of God pastor, he began singing with his brother, Tim in their father's church in the northern San Joaquin Valley of California at age nine. They eventually branched out to other churches in and around the San Francisco Bay Area. Throughout the late 1960s they toured with older brother, Gary, as the Archer Brothers'. In 1970, Tim and Steve formed the Archers with Nancye Short and Billy Rush Masters in Southern California. They recorded and toured internationally from the 1970s through the early 1990s. Younger sister Janice replaced Short in 1977; Masters also left the band at this time. That year their album Fresh Surrender was nominated for a GMA Dove Award. They appeared at the Jimmy Carter White House in 1978 and on the Grammy Awards telecast twice, in 1981 and 1982 winning the Grammy Award for Best Gospel Performance, Contemporary or Inspirational and nominated for Best Gospel Performance respectively. The group suspended recording in 1985, and performed only on a limited schedule until 1991, when they re-entered the studio for a final project, Colors Of Your Love. They toured until 1993 when they disbanded.

Over the course of his career, Archer became recognized for his standout blue-eyed-soul performances, as well as his soft MOR ballads. In 1982, while still performing with The Archers, he signed with Chris Christian's Home Sweet Home Records, and launched a solo career, releasing his first album, Solo After the Archers relaxed their touring schedule in 1985, he expanded his solo work, recording and touring nationally. Throughout the decades of the late-1970s and 1980s, first with the Archers and subsequently solo, he was a regular guest vocalist on The Hour of Power television broadcast.

In 1983, he released Through His Eyes of Love and the album went to No. 1 on the Contemporary Christian charts. In support, he taped the first known contemporary Christian video, which was shown on television broadcasts nationwide. He appeared in 1985 on the We Are His Hands album with various artists. In 1985, he recorded a duet with Fifth Dimension and Solid Gold star, Marilyn McCoo, for his Action album. The resulting single "Safe" quickly went to No. 2 on the national charts and was voted CCM Magazine's the Archers 4 Song of the Year. At this time, he was performing about 200 dates a year. In 1987, his next album, Off the Page, riding on the momentum of the previous album, gave him the No. 1 single, "If You Were the Only One". Home Sweet Home released Hits in 1988, a compilation album. He joined with Tim and Janice in 1991, to record a final Archers album, Colors of Your Love, while still performing independently. The group toured in support until 1993, when they disbanded.

Archer continued to tour in a reduced capacity and suspended recording, moving to Texas to spend more time with his family. Again, in 1994, his label released another compilation, Contemporary Christian Gold and he appeared on the holiday album, Gift of Love: A Christian Christmas Celebration with various other artists. In 1998, for the first time in five years, Archer returned to the studio and released Stay Right Here on the new, Kle-Toi label with "Back on My Feet" and "Stay Right Here" as its singles. He appeared on a number of Christian telecasts, including Life Today with James Robison.

Archer is an ASCAP songwriter and throughout his career, has penned much of his own material, both for the Archers (including 1979's "Stand Up!"), and his solo recordings. In the late-90s, his management continued to book him in up to 150 dates annually in some of America's best Christian venues. Although he did continue to ramp back on engagements, he toured at more than 100 dates-a-year into 2004, without the strength of a record. He re-entered the studio in 2005 for Call It Grace, which included several favorites previously recorded with the Archers (including Billy Rush Masters', "Fresh Surrender") as well as new material. He continues to tour.

Archer lives in the Dallas–Fort Worth metroplex. He has four children.

=== Discography ===
Albums released in North America

Label	Albums	Music videos
Home Sweet Home Records	1982 Solo; 1983 Through His Eyes; 1985 Action; 1987 Off the Page; 1988 Hits; 1994 Christian Contemporary Gold: Through His Eyes	1983 "Through His Eyes of Love"; 1984 "I'll Do My Best"
Kle-Toi	1998 Stay Right Here	
Brentwood	1999 The Very Best of Steve Archer	
TAG Music Group	2005 Call It Grace	

Various artist compilations
Label	Albums
Home Sweet Home Records	1985 We Are His Hands; 1986 Home Sweet Home Video Sampler (VHS); 1994 Gift of Love: A Christian Christmas Celebration
