= All Systems Are Go =

Studio album by The Archers
- Released: 1984
- Genre: Contemporary Christian
- Label: Light Records
- Producer: Skip Konte, Tim and Steve Archer

The Archers chronology
| Here Comes The King (1983) | All Systems Are Go (1984) | Colors of Your Love (1991) |

All Systems Are Go was The Archers' final return to Light Records. The album scored a hit with "Heaven in Your Eyes," a duet with Tim and Janice. The album also landed The Archers their first TV show of the same name on the Trinity Broadcasting Network. The "All Systems Are Go" Tour would be their final tour with a Live Band.

== Track listing ==
1. "All Systems Are Go" (Jeremy Dalton) — 4:09
2. "What's It Gonna Take" (Jeremy Dalton) — 4:24
3. "Heaven in Your Eyes" (Jeremy Dalton) — 4:00
4. "Get Ready Get Right" (Steve Archer, Bob Somma) — 4:10
5. "My Hope" (John MacArthur, Jr., Sterling Crew) — 4:22
6. "Walk Like He Walks" (Jeremy Dalton) — 3:42
7. "Winnin' Again" (Steve Archer, Dan Cutrona) — 4:26
8. "Don' Let It" (Tim Archer, John A. Schreiner) — 3:22
9. "Every Good and Perfect Gift" (Jeremy Dalton) — 6:28

"Winnin' Again" also appeared a year later as a bonus song on the LP version of Steve Archer's 1985 album "Action"

== Personnel ==
=== Musicians ===
- Bob Somma: guitar
- James Jamison: bass
- John Andrew Schreiner and Herb Jamerson: keyboards
- Albert Wing: saxophone
- Lee Kicks: drums
- Joe Lala: percussion

=== Production ===
- Produced by Skip Konte, Tim and Steve Archer
- Executive producer - Tim Archer
- Engineered by Skip Konte
- Recorded at Front Page Productions, Costa Mesa, California
- Arrangements by Herb Jamerson
- Mastered by Bernie Grundman
- Photography by Craig Incardone
- Hair by Craig DePhillippi
- Cover art direction and illustration - Kernie Erickson. Sleeve Design - Bob Payne
