= Larry Muhoberac =

American musician (1937–2016)

- Also known as: Larry Owens, Larry Gordon
- Born: Lawrence Gordon Muhoberac, Jr. February 12, 1937; Louisiana, U.S.
- Died: December 4, 2016 (aged 79) Erina, New South Wales, Australia
- Genres: Rock, pop, jazz
- Occupations: Musician; arranger; record producer
- Instruments: Keyboards; trombone; accordion; vocals
- Years active: 1950s–2016
- Formerly of: TCB Band, Woody Herman

Lawrence Gordon Muhoberac Jr. (February 12, 1937 – December 4, 2016) was an American musician, record producer, and composer who was also known under pseudonyms "Larry Owens" and "Larry Gordon".

== Career in America ==
Muhoberac is widely known as the original keyboardist in Elvis Presley's TCB Band. He first appeared live with the group at Presley's Hotel International debut in Las Vegas on July 31, 1969. After one tour in Las Vegas, Glen Hardin replaced him on piano in January 1970. Other members from the TCB era were James Burton (lead guitar), Jerry Scheff (bass), John Wilkinson (rhythm guitar), and Ronnie Tutt (drums).

Muhoberac was born and raised in Louisiana and began playing accordion and piano at age five. He went on the road with Woody Herman at 20 and moved to Memphis in 1959. In 1961, using the pseudonym "Larry Owens", he and his band played two of Presley's Memphis charity concerts.

In the early sixties, Muhoberac moved to the West Coast to work as a studio musician. Presley recruited him to work on his movie soundtracks. He developed a reputation as a top player and arranger, working first with Elvis and later with Neil Diamond, Tina Turner, Ray Charles, Tanya Tucker, Ray Conniff and Barbra Streisand. Later in his career he arranged and conducted for numerous successful acts, including Seals & Crofts, Nancy Sinatra and Contemporary Christian band The Archers.

Muroberac composed themes to many TV shows during this time as a production music composer for Network Music, including the theme song to The Bold and the Beautiful, for which he received neither credit nor royalties. He composed "Interlude", the title theme for the Bob Ross television show The Joy of Painting.

== Emigration and career in Australia ==
In 1986, Muhoberac moved to Australia, where he produced records, played piano, and did arrangements for Keith Urban, Rick Price, Grace Knight, Silverchair, and Col Joye. His wife was Andra Willis, a vocalist on The Lawrence Welk Show who had a successful career as a solo artist, with numerous hit singles. His sons, Jamie Muhoberac and Parrish Muhoberac, are well known session musicians, arrangers, producers, and engineers.

== Selected discography ==
- Nancy & Lee Again (1972) Nancy Sinatra & Lee Hazlewood (arranger)
- Gratifaction / Can't Take My Eyes Off You (1973) Petula Clark (arranger, conductor)
- Woman (1973) Nancy Sinatra (arranger, band leader, piano)
- Cherry Smiles: The Rare Singles (2009) Nancy Sinatra (bandleader, piano)
- Frankie & Johnny (1966) Elvis Presley (keyboards)
- Paradise Hawaiian Style (1966) Elvis Presley (keyboards)
- Speedway (1968) Elvis Presley (keyboards)
- Stay Away Joe (1968) Elvis Presley (keyboards)
- Elvis: In Person At The International Hotel, Las Vegas, Nevada [LIVE] April 1970 (keyboards)
- Elvis On Stage: February 1970 –LIVE- (keyboards)
- Rock Requiem (1971) Lalo Schifrin
- Stoney End (1971) Barbra Streisand (keyboards)
- Summer Breeze (1972) Seals & Crofts (keyboards/arrangements)
- Diamond Girl (1973) Seals & Crofts (keyboards/arrangements)
- I Am I Said (1971) Neil Diamond (keyboards, arrangements)
- Take A Ten (1974) Masa Takagi (keyboards)
- Fresh Surrender (1976) The Archers (arrangements/keyboards)
- TNT (1978) Tanya Tucker (keyboards)
- Stand Up! (1979) The Archers (producer/arranger/keyboards)
- "America's Greatest Hero" (1981) Joey Scarbury (piano)
- Stormy Weather (1991) Grace Knight (producer/arranger)
- Neon Ballroom (1999) Silverchair (arranger)
- Diorama (2002) Silverchair (arranger)
- Year Of Sunday (1971) Seals & Crofts (keyboards)

== Collaborations ==
- Tap Root Manuscript - Neil Diamond (1970)
- Stoney End - Barbra Streisand (1971)
- Barbra Streisand - Barbra Streisand (1971)
- Michael Franks - Michael Franks (1973)
- And the Feeling's Good - José Feliciano (1974)
- For My Love... Mother Music - José Feliciano (1974)
- Common Sense - John Prine (1975)
- Just Wanna Rock 'n' Roll - José Feliciano (1975)
- Music, Music - Helen Reddy (1976)
- The Painter - Paul Anka (1976)
- Listen to Your Heart - Paul Anka (1978)
- Songbird - Barbra Streisand (1978)
- Never Alone - Amy Grant (1980)
- It's the World Gone Crazy - Glen Campbell (1981)
