= Danny Gaither =

American singer (1938–2001)

- Born: Daniel Joseph Gaither; November 20, 1938; Alexandria, Indiana, U.S.
- Died: April 6, 2001 (aged 62) Indianapolis, Indiana, U.S.
- Genre: Christian

Danny Gaither (November 20, 1938 – April 6, 2001), was an American gospel music singer from Alexandria, Indiana, and an original member of the Bill Gaither Trio.

== Early years ==
Born Daniel Joseph Gaither, he was the son of George and Lela Gaither. He "began singing for community groups when he was only 3, with his mother accompanying him on the piano."

He attended the Cunningham School, where in the seventh grade he won a music award. Later, he was a student at Alexandria (Indiana) High School, where he was elected president of his senior class. He went on to attend Ball State University. After graduating from Ball State, he went to Ohio to teach industrial arts in the Wheelersburg Local School district, beginning in 1962. By 1966, he had returned to Indiana to teach at Alexandria High School.

=== Religion ===
As a youngster, Gaither was a member of the Nazarene church in his hometown.

By 1950, he was already singing religious music in an organized group. He and his brother, Bill, were half of a quartet known as the Junior Dixie Four. In 1954, he was the tenor soloist from a 100-member high school choir for a community sunrise service in his hometown.

By the time Gaither was 15, his interest in Southern gospel music had already been ignited. An item in a local newspaper reported that he and brother Bill had attended an out-of-town "all-night sing" that featured The Blackwood Brothers and The Statesmen Quartet.

== Career ==
By the time Gaither was 18, he, brother Bill, and sister Mary Ann had formed the Gaither Trio, and the group was singing at churches and religious events. A 1957 newspaper advertisement for a "Frankfort Zone Young People's Rally" featured a picture of the trio and the slogan, "GOSPEL SONGS you'll really like."

After he moved to Ohio to teach in a high school, Gaither became a member of the Golden Keys Quartet, which was based in Portsmouth, Ohio. He sang second tenor with the group.

Gaither sang to audiences around the world with the trio. (Mary Ann was later replaced by Bill's wife Gloria.) In 1977, he left the group and embarked on a successful solo career. An advertisement for a 1994 concert said: "For years Danny's unique voice added the special sound to the Bill Gaither Trio. Now Danny is on his own, still singing but also sharing in a new and special way." As a soloist, he produced a number of albums including Singing to the World, It Is Well With My Soul, Sing a Song of Love and Sweet and High. As a soloist, he was a guest on The 700 Club on television.

The stress of touring affected Dan, and in the early 1990s he experienced problems with his vocal cords. The problems were so severe that he was forced to stop touring, although he was able to occasionally appear with Bill and other fellow gospel singers in the well-known "Homecoming" performances.

He also was minister of music at Chesterfield Community Church of God.

During one such performance, at the 1994 Praise Gathering in Indianapolis, Indiana, Bill Gaither and Mark Lowry concocted a surprise for Danny and those in attendance. Lowry walked down from the stage to the audience during "The Longer I Serve Him," and tapped Danny to sing a verse, which moved both the audience and the other Homecoming performers to tears.

Danny continued to join the Homecoming group whenever his health permitted, even after he was diagnosed with lymphoma.

== Recognition ==
Gaither was a finalist for the GMA Dove Award in the Best Male Gospel Vocalist category in 1973 and 1974. Gaither was inducted into the Southern Gospel Music Association's Southern Gospel Music Hall of Fame (Pigeon Forge, TN) in 2010.

== Personal life ==
Gaither and his first wife, Toni, had three children, Nic, Mitchell and Trina. A son and the daughter were active in Christian music. Nic Gaither played bass in the group that accompanied his father in concerts. In late 2001, Danny's second wife, Vonnie and Trina were two-thirds of the Gaither, Oliver and Oren trio.

== Death ==
Gaither died of lymphoma April 6, 2001, in Alexandria, Indiana. He was 62. He was surrounded by his wife, three children, three grandchildren, his parents, his brother, and his sister.
