= Explo '72 =

Evangelistic conference

Explo '72 was an evangelistic conference held from June 12 to June 17, 1972, in Dallas, Texas. It was sponsored by Campus Crusade for Christ, planned and directed by Paul Eshleman. Explo '72 has been called the most visible event of the 1970s Jesus movement, and came to be associated with the same, even though its primary attendees were not directly involved in that movement.

It was held in various locations in Dallas with a nightly gathering in the Cotton Bowl. Its goal was to gather 100,000 high school and college students together to train them in personal evangelism, with a vision toward world evangelism, and to encourage attendees to seek some form of Christian service career.

== Background ==
Attendance at the daytime conference was estimated at 80,000, with about 95% from a white background, fewer than 3000 black attendees, and an international representation of 75 countries. Most of these were middle class high school and college students.

The daily schedule included evangelism classes and seminars in the daytime, with hands-on exercises in the afternoon. Nightly events at Cotton Bowl featured bands, well known preachers, and professional athletes from various sporting teams.

Billy Graham spoke on six occasions during the event including the final event which was a public, eight-hour-long, Christian music festival on Saturday, June 17, 1972. Dubbed "The Christian Woodstock", the event drew an estimated attendance between 100,000 and 200,000. Newsweek described the crowds as being "militant Christians." Featured artists were Love Song, Larry Norman, Randy Matthews, The Archers, Andrae Crouch and the Disciples, Children of the Day, Johnny Cash, and Kris Kristofferson. The festival was held on a huge open swath of land just north of downtown Dallas that had been cleared for construction of the Woodall Rodgers Freeway. Portions of this event were recorded and released on the 1972 album Jesus Sound Explosion. Included on the album were performances by artists as diverse as Johnny Cash, Andrae Crouch and The Disciples, Willa Dorsey, the Speer Family, and Armageddon Experience.

Many conservative Christian groups were critical of Explo '72 for its ecumenical involvement with both Protestant and Roman Catholic ministries, and for its use of rock music. The event attracted Jesus movement fringe groups, including the Children of God and the Christian World Liberation Front.

== Impact ==
The long-term impact of Explo '72 is difficult to measure. The most obvious and lasting effect was the influence of Jesus music, which would later be more commonly called Contemporary Christian Music. At least one critic credits the event with spawning the entire Christian music industry.

In her book God Gave Rock and Roll to You, Leah Payne writes:

In many ways, the preaching and musical lineup at Explo '72 also demonstrated that the efforts of the National Association of Evangelicals to create a coalition of the faithful under the category of 'evangelical' were paying off. Fans of Southern Gospel, Black Gospel, and Jesus music may have occupied distinct demographic segments of society in the United States, but the fact that these diverse artists shared the stage at Explo '72 indicated that they could be brought together to encourage evangelical Christian conversion. Graham, Campus Crusade, and many others also recognized through Explo '72 that Jesus music had captured the ears and hearts of the youth group crowd.

David Hill Scott, writing for the May, 2005, edition of Christianity Today, documented the effects Explo '72 had on Pope John Paul II. As a cardinal in Poland, the future Pope was heavily influenced toward evangelistic efforts by Joe Losiak, a Polish American student who had attended Explo '72 and introduced its concepts to Roman Catholic officials in Poland.
