= Bill Gaither Trio =

American gospel music group

The Bill Gaither Trio
- Also known as: The Gaither Trio
- Origin: Alexandria, Indiana, U.S.
- Genres: Gospel, Christian
- Years active: 1955–1961; 1963–1991
- Labels: Heart Warming, Impact, Word

The Bill Gaither Trio, originally simply The Gaither Trio, was an American gospel music group, last consisting of Bill, his wife Gloria Gaither, and Danny Gaither.

== History ==
In 1955, The Gaither Trio—consisting of siblings Bill, Danny, and Mary Ann—started singing at churches and religious events.

In 1962, Danny graduated from college and went to Ohio to teach. His move brought about a change in the trio, as Gloria began "singing with the trio in the place of Dan." At that time, Bill and Gloria were high school teachers; Mary Ann was a college freshman. By 1966, Danny had rejoined the trio, with Gloria having had a baby. The group cycled through several other singers over the course of their three-and-a-half-decade career.

== Recognition ==
Among the honors the group has received are two Grammys and seventeen Dove Awards. The group was inducted into the Gospel Music Association Hall of Fame in 1999. They were referred to by a newspaper as "the masters of gospel 'feel-good music.'"

Grammy Award	Year	Title
Best Inspirational Performance	1973	Let's Just Praise The Lord
Best Inspirational Performance	1975	Jesus, We Just Want To Thank You

The Bill Gaither Trio received 17 Dove Awards from Gospel Music Association of the United States to recognize outstanding achievement in the Christian music industry. The Gaither Trio was recognized as one of the most influential Christian artists in their time.

== Members ==
Lead

- Danny Gaither (1955–1961; 1966–1977; 1990–1991)
- Gary McSpadden (1977–1988)
- Michael English (1988–1989)

Alto

- Mary Ann Gaither (1955–1961; 1963–1967)
- Gloria Gaither (1963–1966; 1967–1968; 1971–1991)
- Sherry Slattery (1968)
- Betty Fair (1968–1970)

Baritone

- Bill Gaither (1955–1961; 1963–1991)

== Discography ==
- 1960: Presenting the Gaither Trio of Indiana, Volumes 1 & 2
- 1960: Oh How I Love Him
- 1960: The Ninety and Nine (Skylite)
- 1964: Songs of Praise and Devotion (TDE Records)
- 1964: He Touched Me (TDE Records)
- 1965: The Longer I Serve Him (Gaither Music)
- 1965: Songs by Bill Gaither As Sung by His Brother Dan (Crusade)
- 1966: Sincerely (Heart Warming Records)
- 1966: When God Seems So Near (Heart Warming Records)
- 1967: Happiness (Heart Warming Records)
- 1968: I'm Free (Heart Warming Records)
- 1969: He Touched Me (Heart Warming Records)
- 1969: Sings Warm (Heart Warming Records)
- 1970: At Home In Indiana
- 1971: The King Is Coming
- 1971: Because He Lives
- 1972: Live (2 LPs)
- 1972: Christmas...Back Home In Indiana
- 1972: My Faith Still Holds
- 1973: Especially For Children Of All Ages
- 1973: Let's Just Praise The Lord
- 1974: Something Beautiful: An Evening With The Bill Gaither Trio (Live; 2 LPs)
- 1974: Thanks For Sunshine
- 1975: I Am A Promise
- 1975: Jesus, We Just Want To Thank You
- 1976: Praise
- 1977: My Heart Can Sing – The Inspiring Songs of Stuart Hamblen
- 1977: Moments For Forever (Live; 2 LPs)
- 1978: Pilgrim's Progress (Impact)
- 1978: I Am Loved (Bill, Gloria & Gary)
- 1979: We Are Persuaded
- 1979: He Touched Me
- 1981: Bless The Lord Who Reigns In Beauty
- 1982: He Started The Whole World Singing
- 1983: Fully Alive
- 1984: Ten New Songs With Kids...For Kids About Life
- 1985: Then He Said Sing
- 1987: Welcome Back Home
- 1990: Hymn Classics (Bill, Gloria & Michael)

Compilations

- 1978: Classics (Impact Records)
- 1978: The Very Best Of The Very Best (Word Records)
- 1980: The Very Best Of The Very Best...For Kids
- 1992: Best Of The Gaithers...Live!
- 1994: Oh Happy Day Vol. 1 & 2
- 1994: Precious Memories
- 1996: Our Recollections
- 2000: Bill Gaither Trio, Vol. 1–4
