= Dottie Rambo =

American singer and songwriter

Background information
- Born: Joyce Reba Luttrell; March 2, 1934; Madisonville, Kentucky, U.S.
- Origin: Indianapolis, Indiana
- Died: May 11, 2008 (aged 74) Mount Vernon, Missouri
- Genres: Christian, southern gospel
- Occupation: Singer-songwriter
- Instruments: Guitar, voice
- Years active: 1950–2008
- Labels: Warner Bros., Heart Warming
- Formerly of: The Gospel Echoes; The Rambos
- Website: dottierambo.net

Dottie Rambo (March 2, 1934 – May 11, 2008) was an American gospel singer and songwriter. She was a Grammy-winning solo artist and multiple Dove Award-winning artist. Along with ex-husband Buck and daughter Reba, she formed the award-winning southern gospel group The Rambos. She wrote more than 2,500 songs, including her most notable, "The Holy Hills of Heaven Call Me", "He Looked Beyond My Fault and Saw My Need", "We Shall Behold Him", and "I Go To the Rock".

Whitney Houston, Elvis Presley, Sandi Patty, Dolly Parton, Vince Gill, Little Richard, Jerry Lee Lewis and George Jones are among those who have recorded Rambo's songs. She also hosted a TV series on TBN that ran as their #2-rated show for six years, “The Dottie Rambo Magazine”.

In 1991 Dottie was inducted into the Gospel Music Hall of Fame, and in 1997 the Southern Gospel Music Hall of Fame. In 2000, Rambo was awarded the ASCAP Lifetime Achievement Award. In 2006 she was inducted into the Kentucky Music Hall of Fame. In 2007, she was inducted into the Nashville Songwriter Association's Hall of Fame, becoming only the 10th female ever inducted. In 2008, she was inducted into the Georgia Music Hall of Fame.

On May 11, 2008, while on her tour bus headed to Texas for a Mother's Day concert, it crashed in Mt. Vernon, Missouri, killing her instantly.

== Biography ==
=== Early life ===
She was born Joyce Reba Luttrell in Madisonville, Kentucky in 1934 to Jerald Vernon "Chick" and Elizabeth Luttrell. According to personal accounts, she grew up in poverty and developed an early affinity for country music. She learned to play guitar while listening at night to the Grand Ole Opry on WSM radio in Nashville. At age eight, she started writing songs while sitting on a creek bank near her Morganfield, Kentucky home. She had the support of her mother and father, and by age ten she was singing and playing country music cover tunes on a local radio program.

At twelve years old, she became a born-again Christian and made a commitment to write and sing Christian music. The decision turned out to be pivotal in more than one way; it did not sit well with her father who gave her an ultimatum – give up Christian music or leave. She left home and went on the road, with her first engagement being at a church in Indianapolis, Indiana. She formed a trio called the Gospel Echoes and traveled throughout the midwestern and southern United States. The Gospel Echoes would consist of different members over the years, including Pat Green and Little Joe Hatfield.

In 1950, at age sixteen, she met Buck Rambo at a revival meeting she was holding with evangelist Jimmie Russell. They married shortly thereafter and began traveling and singing together after years of her traveling alone and living with pastors' families.

The Singing Rambos became the group's name with the addition of their daughter Reba in the mid-1960s. Through an introduction by another gospel group, the Happy Goodman Family, Rambo sang for the then-governor of Louisiana, Jimmie Davis, who was also a popular country and gospel music recording artist. Davis signed her to a writing contract with his publishing company, Jimmie Davis Music (BMI).

She received a signing bonus of around $3,000, the most she had ever earned up to that time. Though Jimmie Davis appears as a co-writer on Rambo's compositions during this time, she publicly stated he did not write any music or lyrics to her compositions but required a writer's share upon the publishing agreement. Jimmie Davis Music is now owned by Peer Music.

=== Rise to stardom ===
Throughout the 1960s her star began to rise, mostly as a songwriter, but also as a soloist. As the leader of The Singing Rambos she traveled internationally, including a 1967 trip to Vietnam to perform for American troops. While there, Rambo ministered in field hospitals, the USS Kitty Hawk, and the USS Ticonderoga. In Vietnam the group was billed as the "Swinging Rambos", as the government feared that a Christian singing group's safety could be at risk. US soldiers presented Rambo with a Viet Cong flag and other personal mementos from the war. She also performed in other parts of the world for the USO including Thule, Greenland. Outside of the USO tours she also traveled behind the Iron Curtain, throughout Europe, West Indies, Bahamas, The Holy Land (Israel), and Canada.

Her songwriting break and Davis' company's promotion of Rambo's songs resulted in a Warner Bros. Records recording contract for her and the Gospel Echoes. After earning as little as $50 a week for years, and often working day jobs to make ends meet, Rambo's fortunes began to improve. Their records were selling and her songs were being noticed within the industry, with other gospel groups beginning to record them. In 1968 she won a Grammy Award for Best Soul Gospel Performance for her album It's The Soul Of Me. Poor record sales for the Gospel Echoes caused the Warner Bros. label to release the group. Warner Bros. saw something special in Dottie as a solo artist and asked her to sign on with a recording contract for R&B music, she signed instead with the Benson Records as a solo artist and as part of The Singing Rambos.

Rambo worked with Billy Graham, Jimmy Swaggart, Oral Roberts, Benny Hinn, Kathryn Kuhlman, John Hagee, Jim Bakker, Tammy Faye Bakker-Messner, Paul and Jan Crouch, Paula White, Reinhard Bonnke, Pat Robertson, T. D. Jakes and others.

Her Down by the Creekbank is one of the most successful Christian children's records in history, earning platinum record status. In addition to her solo and trio recordings, Rambo appeared on other artists' recordings including Jimmie Davis, Barbara Mandrell, Dickey Betts of the Allman Brothers, The Dunaways, David Robertson, Amy Lambert, Kristian Booth, and Walt Mills.

=== Later years ===
In 1987, Rambo suffered a ruptured disk which led to paralysis in her left leg. She underwent a series of surgeries that eventually reinstated limited mobility. Dottie and Buck divorced in 1994.

Although partially disabled, Rambo made major television appearances including The 700 Club, and as a regular guest performer on TBN. In 1994, TBN produced a Tribute Concert special that featured two hours of performances by Ricky Skaggs, Ricky Van Shelton, Vickie Winans, Jeannie C. Riley, Lulu Roman, and many others.

In 2002, Rambo reentered the studio to record her first solo album in eighteen years. The result was the award-winning hit Stand by the River. The title track, a duet with Dolly Parton, went to the number one spot of the Christian Country Radio Chart, as did its follow-up, "I'm Gonna Leave Here Shoutin'".

In 2004, a major live concert DVD/CD project, We Shall Behold Him: A Tribute to Dottie Rambo, was released. The concert was hosted by Barbara Mandrell and included performances by Dolly Parton, Crystal Gayle, Larry Gatlin, The Isaacs, Jessy Dixon, Vestal Goodman, The Speers, The Crabb Family, and Albertina Walker.

In 2007, she performed nationwide and appeared in concert at country singer Dolly Parton's Tennessee theme park, Dollywood.

In November 2007, Rambo completed another studio album with the working title of Sheltered. This album was released posthumously in September 2009 on Daywind Records. The project features 12 tracks, including duets with Porter Wagoner, Mel Tillis, The Whites and Lulu Roman. Upon completing this project, Rambo started another project that was to feature new compositions and music for a 2009 release.

In 2010, a tribute album began the recording process, featuring new tracks by artists from various genres of music, such as George Jones, Little Richard, Dolly Parton, Solomon Burke and other legendary performers. The album was reported to have been produced by her longtime manager (Larry Ferguson) and former assistant (Chris Barnes).

=== Death ===
Rambo died on May 11, 2008, as a result of injuries sustained in a bus accident along Interstate 44 just outside Mount Vernon, Missouri. She had just finished a performance at Calvary Life Church in Granite City, Illinois and was en route to a Mother's Day show in Texas when the 1997 Prévost bus she was traveling in ran off the road, struck a guard rail and hit an embankment. Rambo was pronounced dead at the scene. Her manager Larry Ferguson and his family were injured in the crash.

Her funeral was held at Christ Church in Nashville, Tennessee on May 19, 2008. Singers sang Rambo's compositions and included a who's who in the Christian music world. Dottie's longtime friend Barbara Mandrell was one of those who eulogized the Gospel Music icon. President George W. Bush sent a flag that hung over the White House on the day of her passing, along with remarks that were read. She was interred at the Woodlawn Memorial Park in Nashville. Lily Tomlin's parents, Little Jimmy Dickens and Jim Ed Brown are interred next to her.

== Compositions ==
Rambo reportedly composed upwards of 2,500 songs. ASCAP and BMI show only several hundred registered titles attributed to Rambo in its online database. Rambo's best-known songs include "We Shall Behold Him", "Holy Spirit Thou Art Welcome (In This Place)", "I Go to the Rock", "Sheltered in the Arms of God", "I Will Glory in the Cross", "He Looked Beyond My Fault", "Tears Will Never Stain the Streets of That City", "For What Earthly Reason", "If That Isn't Love", and "Too Much to Gain to Lose". She also wrote country music songs recorded by Jimmie Davis, Charlie Louvin, Rhonda Vincent, and Hank Snow, among others.

Rambo's songs have been recorded by a virtual "who's who" in the music world with her biggest songwriting cut being Whitney Houston's version of "I Go to the Rock", which appeared on the motion picture soundtrack for The Preacher's Wife. The recording garnered Rambo and Houston the 1998 GMA Dove Award for Traditional Gospel Song of the Year.

In addition, other secular artists have recorded Dottie Rambo compositions, including Solomon Burke, Johnny Cash, Carol Channing, Barbara Fairchild, Larry Gatlin, Crystal Gayle, Vince Gill, Wanda Jackson, George Jones, Alison Krauss, Jerry Lee Lewis, Barbara Mandrell, Bill Monroe, The Oak Ridge Boys, Dolly Parton, Elvis Presley, Little Richard, Jeannie C. Riley, Connie Smith, Hank Snow, Mel Tillis, Rhonda Vincent, Porter Wagoner, and Dottie West.

Numerous Christian/gospel artists have recorded her songs, such as Aaron Jeoffrey, Vanessa Bell Armstrong, The Barrett Sisters, The Blackwood Brothers, The Booth Brothers, The Inspirations, Greater Vision, Commissioned, The Crabb Family, Andrae Crouch, Danniebelle Hall, Jimmie Davis, DC Talk, Jeff and Sheri Easter, The Florida Boys, The Happy Goodmans, Steve Green, Larnelle Harris, Jake Hess, The Hoppers, The Isaacs, Bobby Jones, Ron Kenoly, Doyle Lawson, Mark Lowry, Janet Paschal, Sandi Patty, Karen Peck, David Phelps (musician), The Speer Family, Albertina Walker, Vickie Winans, Karen Wheaton, Jimmy Swaggart, and The Collingsworth Family.

== In popular media ==
Rambo first appeared on television in 1960s on The Gospel Singing Jubilee. She was a frequent guest on Christian television as well as the TNN, PAX, and GMT Women's Entertainment channels. Dottie was part of Christian Television since its conception; appearing on Pat Robertson's CBN, The 700 Club, Paul and Jan Crouch's and TBN, Jim and Tammy Faye Bakker's PTL.

Dottie had her own series, Dottie Rambo Magazine, in the 1980s on TBN. It was the No. 2 rated program on the network for six years and has rerun on and off since. Her show featured segments of cooking, music, fashion shows, and celebrity friends such as Barbara Mandrell, Connie Smith, Dottie West, Minnie Pearl, and Lisa Whelchel (of The Facts of Life sitcom).

Dottie Rambo performed on several of the Gaither Homecoming video series (see her discography) including one devoted solely to her songs “Dottie Rambo with Homecoming Friends”. Her last appearance was Nashville Homecoming (released posthumously in 2009), in which she performed "I Just Came To Talk With You Lord."

Dottie Rambo has been the subject of many biographic television specials: TBN's Portrait of Grace, INSP's Inspirational Groundbreakers, BBC's White Gospel, and GMC's Faith and Fame (with the last being her final interview aired on television).

== Awards and honors ==
Rambo received numerous awards and other honors over the years, including one Grammy and four GMA Dove Awards. She was inducted into the Gospel Music Hall of Fame on two occasions; once as a solo artist in 1991 and second in 2001 as a member of The Rambos.

In 1994 the Christian Country Music Association awarded her with the Songwriter of the Century Award. She was given the ASCAP Lifetime Achievement Award in 2000, and two Christian Country Music Association (CCMA) awards; the Pioneer Award in 2003, and performed "If That Isn't Love" with Anthony Burger, Stella Parton and Marty Raybon on the telecast. In 2004, she won (CCMA) "Songwriter of the Year" and "The Living Legend Award" and performed the show finale "I'm Gonna Leave Here Shoutin" on the Award Show telecast. She was inducted into The Kentucky Music Hall of Fame in 2006, Lily Tomlin presented her the honor and performed a skit as her character "Edith Ann" speaking to God on behalf of Dottie Rambo, and Dottie performed "I've Never Been This Homesick Before".

Her 2002 CD, Stand by the River, won two Christian Music Fan Awards, for Song of The Year and Duo of The Year (with Dolly Parton). The Nashville Songwriter's Hall of Fame inducted Rambo in 2007. She was inducted posthumously into the Christian Music Hall of Fame at the induction award ceremony on June 14, 2008. She was also posthumously inducted into the Georgia Music Hall of Fame. Her manager Larry Ferguson and granddaughter Destiny Rambo Khouri accepted on her behalf and Linda Davis performed Dottie's classic "I Will Glory In The Cross".

In 2011, Rambo was honored with a star on Music City's Walk of Fame, which her daughter Reba accepted on her behalf.
