= The Archers (musical group) =

Contemporary Christian music group

- Origin: United States
- Genres: Contemporary Christian music
- Years active: 1971–1993, 2010-Present
- Labels: Charisma; Impact; Light; Sparrow (MCA Songbird); Reunion (Word-Geffen); New Day
- Members: Tim Archer; Steve Archer; Janice Archer-Cruse
- Past members: Nancye Short-Tsapralis; Billy Rush Masters
- Website: thearcherslegacylive.com: timarchermusic.com

The Archers were an American contemporary Christian music group. They were originally brothers Tim and Steve Archer, Fred Satterfield, Nancye Short and Billy Rush Masters. After Masters and Short departed in 1977, sister Janice Archer joined. They enjoyed greater longevity than most of the pioneering CCM artists, recording chart hits in the decades of the 1970s, '80s, and '90s. Their hits included, "Jesus Is The Answer", "Little Flowers", "It Wouldn't Be Enough" (Aldridge), "Fresh Surrender", "Stand Up!", and "Heaven In Your Eyes". Former Maranatha! Music artist and CCM pioneer Erick Nelson defined The Archers' role in the development of contemporary Christian music as representing one-half of a convergence: traditional vocal groups like The Archers got hipper while the hippie rock groups (like the Maranatha bands) got more mellow—eventually both evinced the polished, commercial sound that would be identified as stereotypical contemporary Christian music.

== Early years ==
The Archer Bros (1965)

Growing up the sons of a pastor in the San Joaquin Valley of northern California, Tim and Steve Archer began singing in their father's church during their childhood. Eventually they branched out to other churches in the San Francisco Bay Area. In the mid-1960s they spent their summers touring with their older brother Gary as the gospel trio, "The Archer Bros." This was a pivotal period in the group's evolution to what eventually became known as contemporary Christian music, since it was the first time they began to incorporate their own electric accompaniment, a rare introduction to evangelical Christian music of the time. In 1966, Tim and Steve entered a talent search contest and placed second nationally. In 1967 with both Tim and Gary playing guitar they began an evolution toward an even more Contemporary sound. Before long (with Gary moving into artist management), they took on additional personnel, drummer Fred Satterfied and guitarist and songwriter Billy Rush Masters and Steve Smart then later adding vocalist Nancye Short after Smart's departure, taking the name The Archers.

== Jesus music ==
By 1971, they were performing in churches and Jesus festivals throughout Southern California with other Christian artists, and came to the attention of Andrae Crouch and Light Records' chief, Ralph Carmichael. With Masters writing many of the early songs, including Fresh Surrender, the group collaborated on vocal arrangements and a new sound, previously unheard of in evangelical circles began to emerge. As Jesus music began to gain a stronger foothold in North America, they came into contact with Pat Boone, eventually touring with him. In the spring of 1972, they went into TTG Studios in Hollywood, California to record their first album, Any Day Now, with Gary producing for their independent "Charisma Records" label. Its release coincided with the group's performance at EXPLO '72 in Dallas, Texas with over a quarter million people in attendance. Masters penned most of the songs for the album including "God's Love", "Put On Jesus", and "For Me, For You". The album also included two songs written by their friend, Andrae Crouch, entitled "It Won't Be Long" and "Jesus is the Answer". Both "God's Love" and "Jesus Is The Answer" became Number One hits in the U.S. and Canada.

== Nashville ==
In 1973, the J.T. Benson Company of Nashville, Tennessee bought Charisma re-releasing the album on its Impact Records imprint as The Archers. By this time The Archers included a full support band with Tim Jacquette (bass), Tim Johnson (keyboards) and Tim Short (drums) all of whom had played on the first album and in earlier concert appearances. With an increasing national profile, the group continued to expand their schedule, appearing in churches and larger concert venues nationwide and Canada. In 1974, they recorded their second and last album for Impact, Keep Singin' That Love Song with Bob MacKenzie producing. Nancye Short contributed heavily to the project, writing and co-writing "Children", "Truth, Peace and Joy", and "He Love's You". Dannie Lee Stutzman, leader of the Jesus band, Danny Lee and The Children of Truth, penned other songs including "Keep Singing That Love Song" and the Number One hit "Little Flowers". Andrae Crouch contributed a tune specifically for the project, "He Washed My Sins Away." The album received critical praise and widespread airplay, laying the foundation for their move to Ralph Carmichael's Light Records.

== Light years ==
By 1975, they had appeared at virtually every significant Jesus festival in the U.S. and Canada, and completed an extensive European tour. In June of that year they released their first Light album, The Archers: Things We Deeply Feel. The album produced a number of chart hits including Masters', "Giver of Life" and "Music", Andrae Crouch's "Lord You've Been Good To Me", "I'm With Jesus", and the CCM Number One hit, "It Wouldn't Be Enough" (Aldridge). The song went on to be covered by a number of other artists. As their profile grew the group's album sales increased and they began to headline larger venues, including main stage performances at Disneyland's "Night of Joy". In late 1976, after returning from a tour of South Africa they entered the studio again teamed with arranger and Elvis Presley TCB Band alumnus, Larry Muhoberac to record their second LP for Light. With the departure of Billy Masters and Nancye Short (who participated on background vocals), Janice Archer assumed the role of female lead. The group reemerged with a dramatically changed look and sound on the 1977 release of the GMA Dove Award nominated, Fresh Surrender. The album, their best selling to that date, produced seven back-to-back hits, including, Masters' title track and "I Need You" and Short's, "I'm Gonna Rise", "Make Me An Instrument", and "With Every Breath I Take" (Aldridge). Both Tim and Steve made their first venture into composing, co-penning the soul single, "Water Into Wine" and Steve's "Sanctified Life." The year 1978 brought the new lineup to a performance at the White House for President Jimmy Carter. Returning to the studio late that year, the group again teamed with Muhoberac, this time as co-producer (with John Guess), for the critically acclaimed, Stand Up. Tim and Steve again contributed tracks with two top ten hits, the title song co-written by Steve, and Tim's "Pickin' Up The Pieces". Other tracks included "Fools Paradise", Kelly Willard's, "Blame It On The One I Love", "Living In Your Love" (later covered by TG Shepard), and "Only His Love" (Aldridge).

== Live ==
In 1980, The Archers released their only live album, Celebrate – Live, recorded en-the-round at one of America's first mega-churches, "Melodyland Christian Center" in Southern California. Rick Riso, formerly of the CCM group, "Messenger", wrote the title song and they performed a decade of previous hits. Another career highpoint came in 1981, when they performed on the 1980 Grammy Awards telecast, winning a Grammy for Best Gospel Performance, Contemporary or Inspirational for their contribution to Reba Rambo and Dony McGuire's The Lord's Prayer. They sang on the telecast again the next year, nominated in the same category for Spreadin' Like Wildfire, also produced by McGuire. In 1982, with opening act Bryan Duncan, they were the first contemporary Christian band to perform at the Universal Amphitheatre in Los Angeles. The performance was sold out. The anniversary year of their first decade as recording artists also brought the release of The Archers: At Their Very Best a compilation of their most popular Light tracks. Billboard Magazine reviewed the release saying, "This collection of the Archers' popular songs of the past decade proves their versatility, covering mainstream pop, light jazz and near-choral arrangements. The retrospective finds several tunes holding up well over the years, including 'It Wouldn't Be Enough,' 'Picking up the Pieces' the soothing 'Music,' and the popular 'Make Me an Instrument.' " In 1984, The Archers released their last album for the now struggling Light Records, All Systems Are Go, which became a catalyst—along with their earlier Grammy win—for their 1985 television show by that name on Trinity Broadcasting Network (TBN). Following a five-year recording hiatus, with each working on solo projects (as well as doing several Archer performances a year) in 1991, the group returned to the studio for, Colors of Your Love, this time on the Reunion label. Their last project as a group, the CD is distinctive in that all of its songs with the exception of "Music (All Around The World)" were penned by outside writers. Still, the project spawned the CCM hits with the title song and "Be Our Guest". The Archers toured in support through 1994, when they disbanded. In 1992 at Canyon Hills Assembly of God in Bakersfield, California at a concert during the "Colors of your Love" tour, Gary Archer was in the audience and was asked to come up on stage to perform with Tim and Steve, "The Archer Bros" performed a couple of songs together.

== Personnel ==
The Archers maintained a full touring band for the first fifteen years of their career. The core band for both their tour and recording bands included lead guitar, rhythm guitar, keyboards, bass and drums. Tim Archer played rhythm guitar and Billy Rush Masters played lead. Nancye Short played piano as well. In a genre known for poor recording production standards they were known for creating well produced albums. They used top musicians, which held true with their touring and recording bands which included some of the best known in West Coast recording history. Although personnel changes occurred in the tour band, a number of members remained for long periods and some went on to prominent careers. Following are some of the group's more prominent members.

== Archers history ==
The Archers lineups
1966–1968 (Under the Name "The Archer Bros")	Gary Archer – Vocals, Guitar; Tim Archer – Vocals, Guitar; Steve Archer – Vocals
1968–1971	Tim Archer – Vocals, Guitar; Steve Archer – Vocals; Billy Masters – Guitar; Fred Satterfied – Drums; Steve Smart – Guitar
1972–1975 (Under the Name "The Archers")	Tim Archer – Vocals; Steve Archer – Vocals; Billy Masters – Guitar; Nancy Short – Vocals; Tim Jaquette – Bass guitar; Tim Johnson – Keyboards; Tim Short – Drums	Any Day Now (1972); The Archers (1973); Keep Singin' That Love Song (1974)
1975	Tim Archer – Vocals; Steve Archer – Vocals; Billy Masters – Guitar; Nancy Short – Vocals; Tim Jaquette – Bass guitar; Tim Short – Drums; Kelly Willard – Piano
1975–1976	Tim Archer – Vocals; Steve Archer – Vocals; Billy Masters – Guitar; Nancy Short – Vocals; Tim Jaquette – Bass guitar; Tim Short – Drums; Phil Kristianson – Keyboards	Things We Deeply Feel (1975)
1977–1980	Tim Archer – Vocals; Steve Archer – Vocals; Janice Archer – Vocals; Tim Jaquette – Bass guitar; Phil Kristianson – Keyboards; Paul Bahn – Drums; Tony Sena – Guitar	Fresh Surrender (1977); In The Beginning – Greatest Hits (1979); Stand Up (1979); The Lord's Prayer – Various Artists (1980)
1980	Tim Archer – Vocals; Steve Archer – Vocals; Janice Archer – Vocals; Tim Jaquette – Bass guitar; Michael Fickling – Drums; Paul Bahn – Percussion; Tony Sena – Guitar; Dan Cutrona – Piano/Keyboards/Synths; Phil Kristianson – Hammond Organ/Piano	Celebrate – Live (1980)
1981–1984	Tim Archer – Vocals; Steve Archer – Vocals; Janice Archer – Vocals; Alex Drizos – Bass guitar; Tony Sena – Guitar; Dan Cutrona – Keyboards	Spreadin' Like Wildfire (1981); At Their Very Best – Greatest Hits (1982); Here Comes The King – Christmas Various Artists (1983); All Systems Are Go (1984); Golden Classics – Greatest Hits (1984)
1985–1991	Tim Archer – Vocals; Steve Archer – Vocals; Janice Archer – Vocals; Dan Cutrona – Keyboards
1991–1994, 2010-Present	Tim Archer – Vocals; Steve Archer – Vocals; Janice Archer – Vocals	Colors of Your Love (1991); 2nd Time Around – Greatest Hits (1992); Legacy Live (2025)

=== Tour band ===
- Nancye Short: Lead Vocals
- Billy Rush Masters: Lead Guitar, Songwriter of Fresh Surrender, Brand New Day, Music (1968-1976)
- Kelly Willard—piano, background vocals (1975): (Went on to success as composer, Praise & Worship ministry)
- Phil Kristianson—keyboards, composer (1975–1980): (Later with Amy Grant, Promise Keepers)
- Fred Satterfield – drums (1968–71): (First drummer, also played on "Any Day Now" - later with The Oakridge Boys)
- Paul Bahn – drums, percussion (1976–1980): (Later with Donna Summer)
- Tony Sena – guitar (1976–1981): One of the few tour band members to also record with the group.
- Tim "Jake" Jaquette – Fender bass (1971–1980, 1982): Primary bass throughout their career. (Recording engineer, producer, recorded and toured with The Archers; recorded with Steve Archer)
- Dan Cutrona – keyboards, vibraphone, Marimba (1978–1980, 1991): (Recorded and toured with The Archers)
- Alex Drizos – Bass guitar (1980–1986): replaced Tim Jaquette (1980) as primary bassist working (touring) the albums Celebrate – Live, Spreadin' Like Wildfire, and All Systems Are Go. He was also the bassist on the Archer's TV show on the TBN network (1984). Recorded with and was primary live Bassist/Vocalist with Steve Archer on and thru the albums Through His Eyes Of Love to Stay Right Here. (1983–1989): (Later toured with Dave Mason (1997-2012), Donna Summer (1992), and Eddie Money. Also worked with Pat Boone, Benny Hester, Phil Keaggy, Edgar Winter and Ambrosia.)

=== Recording band alumni ===
Includes partial list of artists' recording credits

- Ben Benay – guitar: Joe Cocker, Kinky Friedman, Steely Dan, Donna Summer
- Jay Graydon – guitar: Ray Charles, Cheap Trick, Steely Dan, Hall & Oates
- Lee Ritenour "Captain Fingers" – guitar: Fourplay, Pink Floyd, Steely Dan
- Dean Parks – guitar: America, Crosby, Stills & Nash, Steely Dan, Neil Diamond Glen Campbell
- Tim May – guitar: Ray Charles, Charlie Daniels, Debbie Harry, Whitney Houston
- Thom Rottella – guitar: Donna Summer, Cher
- Fred Tackett – guitar: Little Feat, Bob Dylan, Wallflowers, Rod Stewart Glen Campbell
- David Hungate – bass: Bryan Adams, Gladys Knight, Dolly Parton, Toto
- Wilton Felder – bass: The Crusaders
- Reinie Press – bass: Neil Diamond, (Played exclusively for Diamond except for a handful of exceptions)
- Billy Preston – keyboards: The Beatles
- Larry Muhoberac – keyboards: Elvis Presley, Neil Diamond, Tanya Tucker, Seals & Crofts
- Jim Gordon – drums: Eric Clapton, Derek & The Dominos, George Harrison, (co-wrote "Layla" with Eric Clapton)
- Jim Keltner – drums: Bob Dylan, George Harrison, John Lennon, Ringo Starr, The Rolling Stones, Steely Dan
- Hal Blaine – drums: Wrecking Crew, Crosby, Stills & Nash, Beach Boys
- Leland Sklar – bass: James Taylor, Phil Collins, Toto, Lyle Lovett

== Discography ==
=== Albums ===
- Any Day Now (1972)
- The Archers (1973)
- Keep Singin' That Love Song (1974)
- Things We Deeply Feel (1975)
- Fresh Surrender (1977)
- Stand Up! (1979)
- Celebrate – Live (1980)
- Spreadin' Like Wildfire (1981)
- All Systems Are Go (1984)
- Colors of Your Love (1991)
- Legacy Live (2025)

=== Singles ===
- Put On Jesus (A side), God Cares (B side) (1972)
- Keep Singing That Love Song (A side), Little Flowers (B side) (1974)
- Change (1977)
- Fresh Surrender (A side), Make Me An Instrument (B side) (1977)
- I Need You (A side), Water Into Wine (B side) (1977)
- Celebrate (A side), Sunshine On A Cloudy Day (B side) (1980)
- Spreadin' Like Wildfire (A side), Never Say Goodbye (Side B) (1981)
- Back In Your Arms (1981)
- All Systems Are Go (A side), All Systems Are Go (Edited Version B side) (1984)
- Heaven In Your Eyes (1984)
- I Love You Lord (1991)
- Be Our Guest (1991)
- He Ain't Heavy, He's My Brother (2014)
- Legacy Medley (Give Us This Day, It Won't Be Long, Make Me An Instrument, Never Knew Love, Pickin' Up The Pieces) (2025)
- It Wouldn't Be Enough (2025)

=== Compilation albums ===
- In the Beginning (1979)
- At Their Very Best (1982)
- Golden Classics (1984)
- 2nd Time Around (1992)

=== Guest appearances ===
- "Lovely Thou Me" (Tim & Steve from the Various Artist album, Pentecost At Pinecrest Summit Records (1968)
- "Give Us This Day" (from the Reba Rambo and Dony McGuire album, The Lord's Prayer) Light Records (1980)
- Here Comes the King Brentwood Records (1983)
- "Sunshine On A Cloudy Day" (from the Jeff and Sheri Easter album, Treasure) Gaither Music Group (2023)

=== Steve Archer ===
==== Studio albums ====
- Solo (1982)
- Through His Eyes of Love (1983)
- Action (1985)
- Off the Page (1987)
- Christian Contemporary Gold - Through His Eyes (1994)
- Stay Right Here (1998)
- Call It Grace (2005)

==== Compilation albums ====
- Hits (1988)
- The Very Best of Steve Archer (1999)
