= Light Records =

American gospel record label

- Parent company: MNRK Music Group
- Founded: 1966
- Founder: Ralph Carmichael
- Genre: Gospel
- Country of origin: U.S.

Light Records is a gospel record label founded in 1966 by Ralph Carmichael, as a joint venture with the Waco, Texas-based Word Records. It is a subsidiary of the MNRK Music Group.

== History ==
Light Records' first roster included Ralph Carmichael, the Carmichael Young People, Ralph Carmichael's 102 Strings recordings, and Ralph's daughter Kim (Carol) Carmichael. Other artists included Jimmy Durante and Thurl Ravenscroft (the voice of Tony the Tiger in cereal commercials). Light moved into Gospel music quickly, with the 1968 signing of future Grammy Award-winners Andrae Crouch & the Disciples and The Oral Roberts Singers, featuring Richard Roberts (evangelist) who had a hit with their opening theme Something Good Is Going to Happen to You and closing theme A God of Miracles for The Oral Roberts Hour.

Soon other gospel artists, including Kristle Murden, The Archers, The Winans, Walter Hawkins, Tramaine Hawkins and Bob Bailey joined the roster. For a time, Light was also home to contemporary Christian artists such as Sweet Comfort Band, Reba Rambo-McGuire, Jamie Owens, Carman and Paul Porter.

The label gained a reputation for pushing the boundaries of gospel music at this time by employing people like famed A&R executive Bill Maxwell with a pedigree in secular rock. He and several other associates were in support of the sound of gospel progressing beyond that presented by the traditional church as long as the lyrics remained Christian. Carmichael bought out Word's portion of Light/Lexicon in 1980, after ABC/CapCities had purchased Word in 1974. The Christian indie label struck a deal with Elektra Records to aid in distribution circa 1982.

Light was later purchased by Platinum Entertainment in 1993. After Platinum filed bankruptcy in 2001, it was renamed Compendia Music Group, and the Light label continued as an urban-gospel label. Compendia was purchased by Sheridan Square Entertainment in 2004.

In a 2002 interview, Phillip White, then-vice president of Light Records highlighted the history and significance of the label: "Light Records was simply a renaissance of creativity. It heralded a step taken in gospel that has never happened since, in terms of innovation, in terms of music that became more relevant and more accessible. Light Records released music that crossed outside the church and crossed racial boundaries."

As of April 2010, Light Records was owned by Entertainment One. Executive James Robinson ushered in a new era of gospel artists at Light Records circa 2010. After developing artists such as Youthful Praise featuring J.J. Hairston, Robinson was instrumental in supporting significant new releases from Shirley Caesar, Dorinda Clark Cole, Jonathan McReynolds, Dawkins & Dawkins, as well as Destiny's Child member Michelle Williams.

== See also ==
- List of record labels
