= Palmetto State Quartet =

The Palmetto State Quartet
- Origin: Greenville, South Carolina, United States
- Genre: Southern Gospel
- Years active: 1946–2013; 2025–present
- Labels: Skylite Records, Sing Records, Dawn Records, MorningStar Records, Cathedral Records, Sonlite Records, Peaceful Valley Records, Mansion Entertainment

The Palmetto State Quartet is a professional Southern gospel singing quartet that originated in Greenville, South Carolina, in 1946. In 1988 they received at a Singing News Fan Awards ceremony the Marvin Norcross Award for contributions to Southern Gospel over their career.

== Personnel history ==
Tenor

- Leon Sutherland (1946–1949)
- Clarence Owens (1949–1960)
- Claude Hunter (1960–1963, 1970–1985)
- Jerry Hovis (1963–1970)
- Eddie Broome (1985–1993) (also known for Dixie Echoes and the second incarnation of the Florida Boys)
- Brion Carter (1993–2002)
- John Rulapaugh (2002–2006)
- Wesley Smith (2006–2008, 2011) (went on to things like Dixie Echoes and Dailey & Vincent)
- Jeremy Calloway (2008–2009)
- Robert Fulton (2009–2011) (went on to Gold City)
- Jeremy Easley (2011-2013) (previously of The LeFevre Quartet)
- Anthony Roberts (2025-present)

Lead

- Woodrow Pittman (1946–1954)
- Jack Pittman (1954-196?) (at some point Pittman & Bagwell switched parts)
- Jack Bagwell (196?–1968, 1970-1997) (d. 2025)
- Harold Schronce (1968–70)
- Kerry Beatty (1997–2009)
- Paul Lancaster (2009-2013) (also sang with Karen Peck, The Nelons, The Greenes, and recently The Booth Brothers)
- David Staton (2013) (previously of The LeFevre Quartet)
- Brian Beatty (2025–present) (previously of The Nelons)

Baritone

- Malone Thomason (1946–1952)
- Jack Bagwell (1952-196?) (at some point Pittman & Bagwell switched parts)
- Jack Pittman (196?–1967, 1970–1997) (d. 2013)
- Laverne Tripp (1967–68) (went on to Blue Ridge Quartet)
- Jerome Bush (1968–69) (went on to Pine Ridge Boys)
- Milton Sigmon (1969–70)
- Tony Peace (1997–2004) (went on to things like The Kingsmen Quartet and The Dove Brothers)
- Rick Fair (2004–2008, 2026–present) (previously of The Statesmen Quartet)
- Brian Beatty (2008–2009)
- David Darst (2009–2012)
- David Staton (2012-2013)
- DaRon Maughon (2013)
- Woody Beatty (2025–2026)(previously played and sang with Rosie Rozell and Jake Hess)

Bass

- Paul Burroughs (1946–1955)
- Ellison Jenkins (1955–1961)
- Ken Turner (1961–1968) (went on to Dixie Echoes and The Blackwood Brothers)
- Joe Divine (1968-1969)
- Chuck Bright (1969-1970)
- Cliff King (1970–1976)
- Jerry Trotter (1976–1979)
- Joel Duncan (1979–1994) (previously sang with Rosie Rozell)
- Harold Gilley (1994–1997) (previously of Statesmen Quartet)
- Jeff Pearles (1997–2003) (went on to The King's Heralds)
- Jason Brooks (2003)
- Aaron McCune (2003–2006) (went on to things like Gold City, Dailey & Vincent, and Oak Ridge Boys)
- Burman Porter (2006–2008)
- Larry Strickland (2008–2013) (husband of Naomi Judd; previously sang with JD Sumner)
- Mike Allen (2013) (Gaither Homecoming regular)
- Rick Fair (2025–2026)
- Doug Young (2026–present)(previously of Statesmen Quartet and New Speer Revival)

Piano

- Milt Bishop (1946)
- Jamie Dill (1946–1968, 1970–d.1987)
- Charles Abee (1968–1969) (known for The Kingsmen Quartet and The Pine Ridge Boys)
- Carroll Melvin (1970)
- David McAbee (1987–1989)
- Hovie Lister (1989–1991) (brought back his signature Statesmen Quartet later on) (d. 2001)
- Woody Beatty (1989–1999, 2025–present)
- Jerry Kelso (1999–2001) (also played with The Dove Brothers, Dixie Melody Boys, and JD Sumner)
- Andrew Ishee (2001–2006) (also known for The Kingsmen Quartet, Dixie Echoes, and most recently Oak Ridge Boys)
- Bryan Elliott (2006–2008) (went on to things like The Perrys, Gold City, and The LeFevre Quartet)
- KC Martin (2008–2009) (2010-2013)
- Mark Carman (2009–2010)
- Mark Willett (2010) (previously of The Perrys)

Various

- Charles Waller (1983–1997, manager/promoter)
- Eddie Broome (1984–1985, bass guitar/vocals)
- Louie Sprouse (1986, Bass guitar)
- J.J. Jennings (1987, bass guitar)
- Michael W. Carman (2008-2011, road manager)
