= Grammy Award for Best Gospel/Contemporary Christian Music Performance =

Award presented at the Grammy Awards

- Awarded for: Quality vocal or instrumental gospel and CCM recordings
- Country: United States
- Presented by: National Academy of Recording Arts and Sciences
- First award: 1968
- Final award: 2014
- Website: www.grammy.com

The Grammy Award for Best Gospel/Contemporary Christian Music Performance is an award presented at the Grammy Awards, a ceremony that was established in 1958 and originally called the Gramophone Awards. According to the 54th Grammy Awards description guide it is designed for solo, duo/groups or collaborative (vocal or instrumental) gospel or Contemporary Christian music (CCM) and its subgenres' recordings and is limited to singles or tracks only.

This award was first handed out in 1968 under the name of Best Gospel Performance and was intended for albums only.

In 1971 the award was renamed to Best Gospel Performance (other than soul gospel), including both singles and albums, and ran until 1978 when the award was divided into two new awards, the Grammy Awards for Best Gospel Performance, Traditional and Best Gospel Performance, Contemporary.

The category was then revived in 2005 and it was known once again under the name of Best Gospel Performance. In 2012, following a major overhaul of the Grammy categories, this award was renamed as Best Gospel/Contemporary Christian Music Performance which was eligible for all subgenres in the gospel/Contemporary Christian Music (CCM) field.

From 2015, due to a restructuring of the Gospel/Contemporary Christian Music category field, this category will merge with the Best Contemporary Christian Music Song to create the new Grammy Award for Best Contemporary Christian Music Performance/Song category, which will recognize both performers and songwriters of Contemporary Christian Music songs (Gospel performances will now fall under the Best Gospel Performance/Song category). According to the Grammy committee, "changes to the field were made in the interest of clarifying the criteria, representing the current culture and creative DNA of the gospel and Contemporary Christian Music communities, and better reflecting the diversity and authenticity of today's gospel music industry".

The Blackwood Brothers hold the record for most awards in this category with four wins, two of them alongside Porter Wagoner. They also hold the record for most nominations, with seven. Two-time winners include Porter Wagoner, The Oak Ridge Boys, Karen Clark Sheard and CeCe Winans.

== Recipients ==
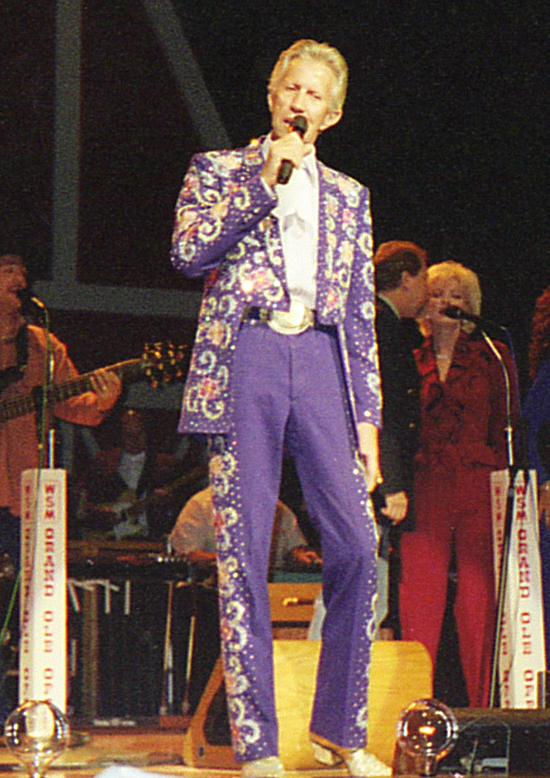
Two-time award winner Porter Wagoner

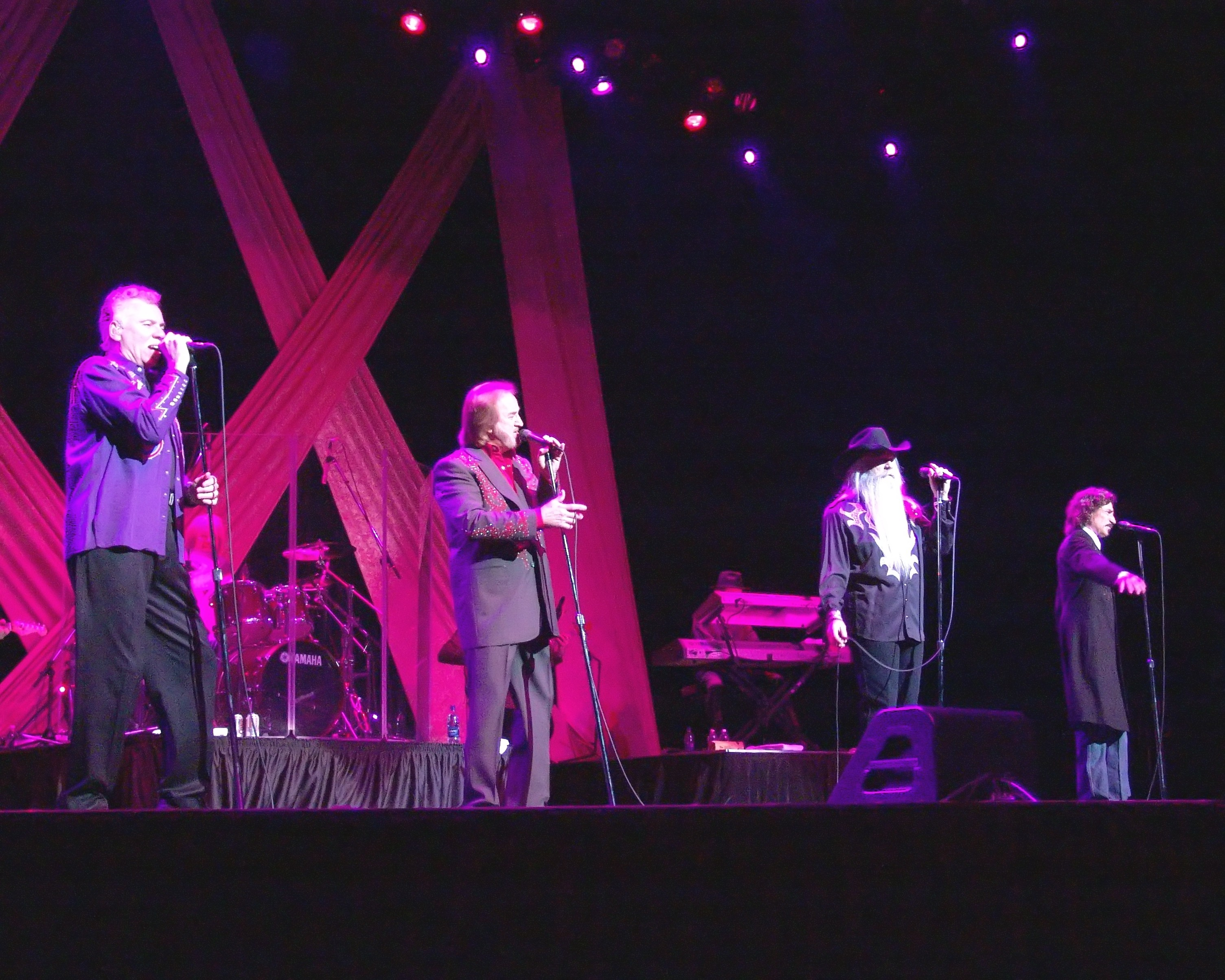
The Oak Ridge Boys have won the award twice

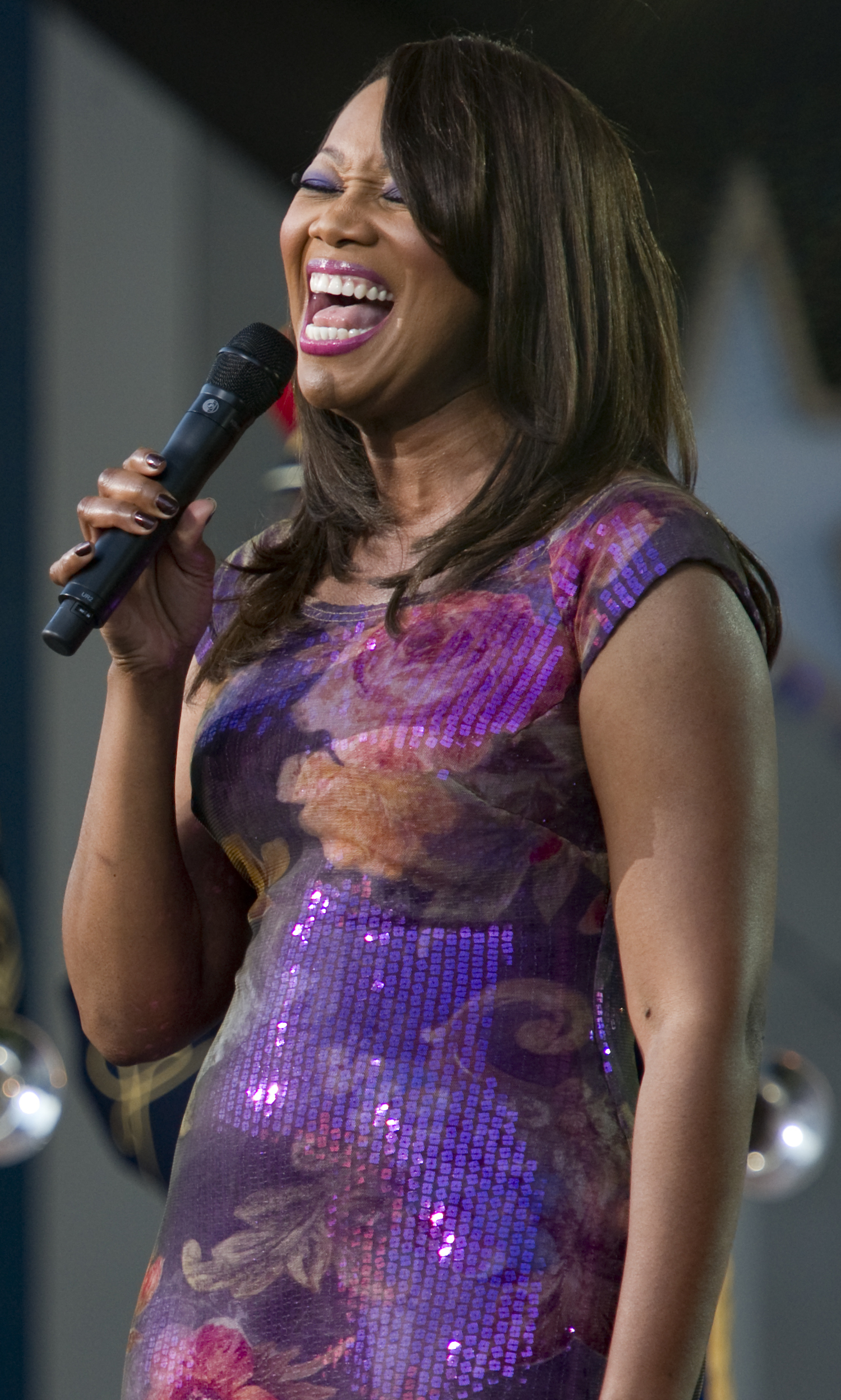
2007 winner Yolanda Adams

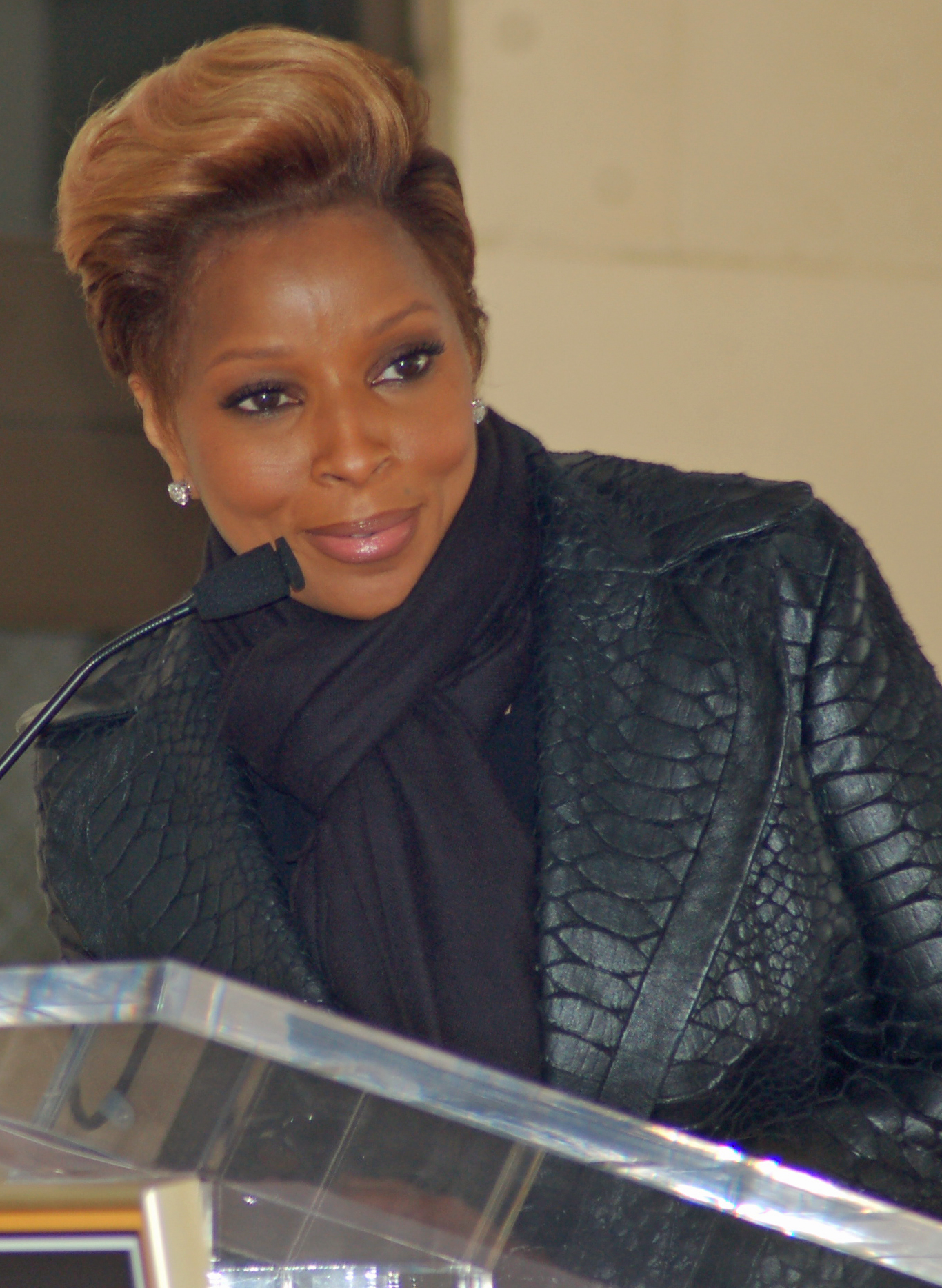
Mary J. Blige won the award in 2008 alongside Aretha Franklin and tied with The Clark Sisters

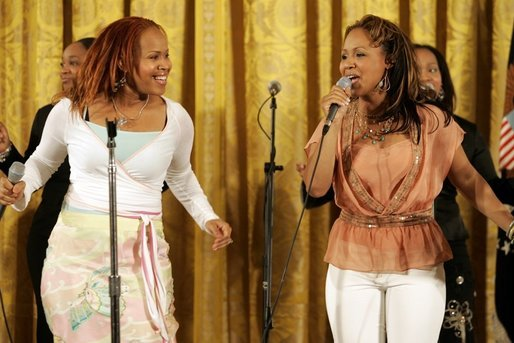
2009 winners Mary Mary

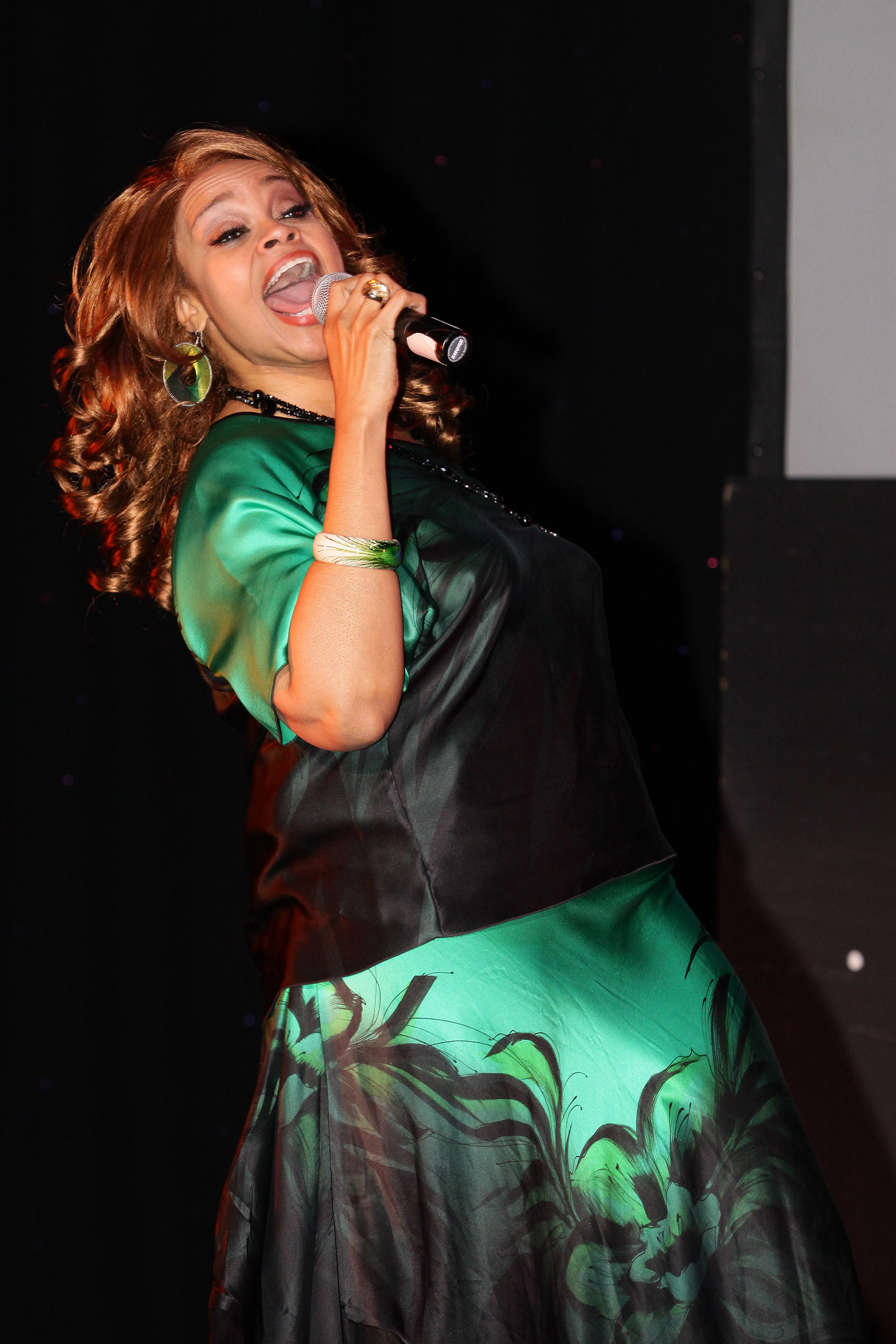
Karen Clark Sheard winner in 2008 and 2010

Year	Winning artist	Work	Other nominees	Ref.
1968	Porter Wagoner & The Blackwood Brothers Quartet	More Grand Old Gospel	Happy Goodman Family – Good 'n' Happy; Oak Ridge Boys – Oak Ridge Boys; Singing Rambos – Singing Rambos, Gospel Ballads; The Blackwood Brothers Quartet – The Blackwood Brothers Quartet Sings for Joy	
1969	Happy Goodman Family	The Happy Gospel of the Happy Goodmans	The Blackwood Brothers Quartet − Yours Faithfully; The Florida Boys − Florida Boys Sing Kinda Country; Thrasher Brothers − For Goodness Sake; Oak Ridge Boys − A Great Day	
1970	Porter Wagoner & The Blackwood Brothers Quartet	In Gospel Country	Oak Ridge Boys – It's Happening; LeFevres – The Best Is Yet To Come; Happy Goodman Family – This Happy House; Singing Rambos – This Is My Valley	
1971	Oak Ridge Boys	Talk About the Good Times	Thrasher Brothers – Fantastic Thrashers at Fantastic Caverns; LeFevres – Moving Up; Wendy Bagwell and the Sunliters – Talk About the Good Times; Florida Boys – The Many Moods of the Florida Boys	
1972	Charley Pride	Let Me Live	Blackwood Brothers – He's Still King of Kings; Oak Ridge Boys – Jesus Christ, What a Man; Hovie Lister & The Statesmen- Put Your Hand in the Hand; Imperials – Time to Get It Together	
1973	Blackwood Brothers	L-O-V-E	Thrasher Brothers – America Sings; Wendy Bagwell and the Sunliters – By Your Request; Oak Ridge Boys – Light; Rambos – Soul in the Family	
1974	Blackwood Brothers	Release Me (from My Sin)	Statesmen – I Believe in Jesus; Andrae Crouch – Just Andrae; The Imperials – Live; Oak Ridge Boys – Street Gospel	
1975	Oak Ridge Boys	The Baptism of Jesse Taylor		
1976	The Imperials	No Shortage	Connie Smith – Connie Smith Sings Hank Williams Gospel; Happy Goodman Family – Happy Goodman Family Hour; Statler Brothers – Holy Bible – New Testament; Johnny Cash – Johnny Cash Sings Precious Memories	
1977	Oak Ridge Boys	Where the Soul Never Dies	The Speers – Between the Cross and Heaven (There's a Whole Lot of Living Going On); Florida Boys – Here They Come; The Imperials – Just Because; Blackwood Brothers – Learning to Lean	
2005	Ray Charles & Gladys Knight	"Heaven Help Us All"	Shirley Caesar and Ann Nesby — "The Stone"; Dr. John and Mavis Staples — "Lay My Burden Down"; Fred Hammond — "Celebrate (He Lives)"; Ben Harper and The Blind Boys of Alabama — "There Will Be a Light"	
2006	CeCe Winans	"Pray"	Yolanda Adams — "Be Blessed"; Kirk Franklin — "Looking For You"; Donnie McClurkin — "I Call You Faithful"; Hezekiah Walker & Love Fellowship Choir — "Lift Him Up"	
2007	Yolanda Adams	"Victory"	Israel & New Breed — "Not Forgotten"; Donald Lawrence & The Tri-City Singers — "The Blessing Of Abraham"; Chris Tomlin — "Made To Worship"; Tye Tribbett — "Victory"	
2008 (tie)	The Clark Sisters; Aretha Franklin & Mary J. Blige United States	"Blessed & Highly Favored" "Never Gonna Break My Faith"	Casting Crowns — "East To West"; Israel & New Breed featuring T-Bone — "With Long Life"; CeCe Winans — "He Set My Life To Music"	
2009	Mary Mary	"Get Up"	Kim Burrell, Rance Allen, Bebe Winans, Mariah Carey and Hezekiah Walker's Love Fellowship Tabernacle Church Choir — "I Understand"; Casting Crowns — "East to West"; Take 6 — "Shall We Gather at the River"; CeCe Winans — "Waging War"	
2010	Donnie McClurkin featuring Karen Clark Sheard	"Wait On The Lord"	Francesca Battistelli — "Free To Be Me"; Heather Headley featuring Smokie Norful — "Jesus Is Love"; Jonny Lang with Fisk Jubilee Singers — "I Believe"; Third Day featuring Lacey Mosley — "Born Again"	
2011	BeBe and CeCe Winans	"Grace"	Forever Jones — "He Wants It All"; Israel Houghton — "You Hold My World"; VaShawn Mitchell — "Nobody Greater"; Kirk Whalum & Lalah Hathaway — "He's Been Just That Good"	
2012	Le'Andria Johnson	"Jesus"	Steven Curtis Chapman — "Do Everything"; Natalie Grant — "Alive (Mary Magdalene)"; Brandon Heath — "Your Love"; Chris Tomlin — "I Lift My Hands"	
2013	Matt Redman	"10,000 Reasons (Bless the Lord)"	Casting Crowns — "Jesus, Friend of Sinners"; Tamela Mann — "Take Me to the King"; Mary Mary — "Go Get It"; Marvin Sapp — "I Win"	
2014	Tasha Cobbs	Break Every Chain (Live)	Natalie Grant - Hurricane; Matt Maher - Lord, I Need You; Mandisa - Overcomer; Tye Tribbett - If He Did It Before...Same God (Live)	

== See also ==
- Grammy Award for Best Gospel Song
- Grammy Award for Best Contemporary Christian Music Song
- Grammy Award for Best Contemporary Christian Music Performance/Song
