= Skylite =

Skylite Recording Company
- Founded: 1959
- Status: Inactive
- Country of origin: United States
- Location: Nashville, Tennessee

Skylite Recording Company is a Memphis based gospel music label started by The Statesmen Quartet and The Blackwood Brothers in 1959. Along with The Blackwood Brothers and The Statesmen Quartet, Skylite signed, among others, The Speer Family, and the Oak Ridge Quartet (later renamed The Oak Ridge Boys). In 1966, the Statesmen-Blackwood team sold the record company to a group of investors led by Joel Gentry, with main offices on Music Row in Nashville, Tenn.

== History ==
Amidst the popularity of The Oak Ridge Boys (specifically when they switched to country music and the hit Elvira), many compilations were made with some of the material from their Skylite recordings. Even though Oaks baritone William Lee Golden only appeared on two Skylite recordings, and Oaks lead Duane Allen only appeared on part of one, and Oaks bass Richard Sterban and Oaks tenor Joe Bonsall appeared on none of these, these covers often showed the current group. Nonetheless, often the same songs are rehashed over several recordings while many others from this era are ignored. The Ken Gaub family recorded with Skylite in the early 1970s, and as Christian Rock began Eternity Express (one of the early groups) also made several records with this label.

From the 1960s through the 1990s, Skylite was one of the pre-eminent southern gospel recording companies in the nation, having released projects by virtually every prominent group of that genre over four decades, including (in addition to those already named above) J.D. Sumner and The Stamps Quartet, Jake Hess, The Imperials, The Masters V, Florida Boys, Harmoneers, Kingsmen, Prophets, Rebels, The Weatherfords, The Martins, Blue Ridge Quartet, Gospel Harmony Boys, Swanee River Boys, The Smitty Gatlin Trio, and many, many other major groups and soloists. The company received numerous industry awards and accolades, including Grammy awards for recordings by Skylite artists, including The Blackwood Brothers.

Eventually the Sing Music Company, owned by The LeFevres, was bought and merged with Skylite as Skylite-Sing. The original masters are rumored to have been destroyed in a fire.

== See also ==
- Bibletone Records
- Jake Hess
- Word Records
