= Gordon Hill =

Gordon Hill may refer to:

== People ==
- Gordon Hill (American football) (born 1993), safety for the San Diego Chargers
- Gordon Hill (footballer) (born 1954), English football player and manager
- Gordon Hill (politician) (born 1951), Australian politician
- Gordon Hill (referee) (1928–2019), English football referee
- Gordon Hill (singer) (1927–2014), American gospel singer
- The Wealdstone Raider (born 1966), real name Gordon Hill, English Internet celebrity

== Places ==
- Gordon Hill, London, an area in the London Borough of Enfield, United Kingdom
  - Gordon Hill railway station
