= The Blackwood Brothers =

American southern gospel quartet (1935–)

The Blackwood Brothers Quartet
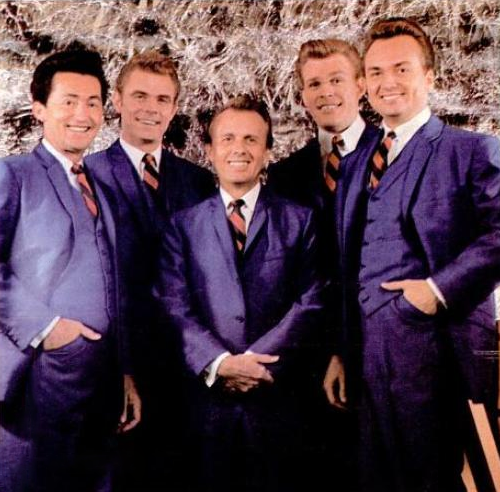
- The Blackwood Brothers Quartet in late 1965

Background information
- Origin: Choctaw County, Mississippi, U.S.
- Genres: Southern gospel, Christian, Contemporary Christian music
- Instruments: Vocals, piano
- Years active: 1934–present
- Labels: RCA Victor, RCA Camden, Skylite, CAM, Voicebox, Daywind.
- Members: Billy Blackwood; Jonathan Mattingly; Eric Walker; Jim Rogers
- Website: blackwoodbrothers.com

The Blackwood Brothers are an American southern gospel quartet. Pioneers of the Christian music industry, they are 8-time Grammy Award winners in addition to winning 7 Gospel Music Association Dove Awards. They are also members of the Memphis Music Hall of Fame, Gospel Music Hall of Fame, the Southern Gospel Museum and Hall of Fame.

== Group beginnings ==
The Blackwood Brothers Quartet were formed in 1934 in the midst of the Great Depression, when preacher Roy Blackwood (1900–1971) moved his family back home to Choctaw County, Mississippi. His brothers, Doyle Blackwood (1911–1974) and 15-year-old James Blackwood (1919–2002), already had some experience singing with Vardaman Ray and Gene Catledge. After adding Roy's 13-year-old son, R.W. Blackwood (1921–1954), to sing baritone, the brothers began to travel and sing locally. By 1938, a fifth group member playing the piano was included in the lineup, though the name of the group was not adjusted as the group still sang as a quartet. By 1940, they were affiliated with the Stamps-Baxter Music Company to sell songbooks and were appearing on 50,000-watt radio station KMA (AM) in Shenandoah, Iowa. Doyle left in 1942 and was replaced by Don Smith. After Doyle left, The Quartet relocated to Memphis, Tennessee in 1950. The move proved to be successful for the group as they began to appear on television station WMCT in coming years. In 1952 they signed a major recording contract with RCA Victor. After the move to Memphis, Roy left and was replaced with Calvin Newton, who was replaced with Cat Freeman, and after Freeman left, Alden Toney was hired to sing tenor. In 1951, Alden Toney and Don Smith left and were replaced with Dan Huskey and Bill Lyles. In 1952, Dan Huskey left and was replaced by Bill Shaw. On June 14, 1954, the Blackwood Brothers lineup of Bill Shaw (tenor), James Blackwood (lead), R.W. Blackwood (baritone), Bill Lyles (bass), and Jackie Marshall (piano), won the Arthur Godfrey's Talent Scouts competition on national television with their rendition of "Have You Talked To The Man Upstairs?" The win propelled them into the national spotlight and beyond just the Southern United States.

== Clanton, Alabama plane crash ==
After winning on Talent Scouts, the group began flying to shows with their own private plane due to the demand of their performances. However, on June 30, 1954, the group was scheduled to perform with The Statesmen Quartet in Clanton, Alabama, during a town festival. Prior to the start of their show, members R.W. Blackwood and Bill Lyles, along with friend Johnny Ogburn, decided to take a quick ride on the plane around dusk. Tenor singer Bill Shaw recalled the event saying: "the plane went out its usual way, but then seemed like it got caught in the upward position and could not pull out, and then just fell to the ground and killed everyone on board." Members of The Statesmen Quartet also witnessed it and provided aid to the survivors, taking them back to Memphis that night. The funeral was attended by thousands in Memphis, including a young Elvis Presley. Members James Blackwood, Bill Shaw, and Jackie Marshall decided to press on, with R.W.'s younger brother, Cecil Blackwood (1934–2000), taking over as baritone and former Sunshine Boys Quartet member J. D. Sumner replacing Lyles as bass. Ken Berryhill, their producer, would later say that it was at about this point in their career that the group first crossed paths with the young Elvis Presley, with whom they became friends.

In the following years, the group was the first to customize a bus to make travel spacious and comfortable for entertainers, thereby inventing the customized "Tour Bus". Presley saw the bus and had one made for himself.

== Group pinnacle ==
After the crash, the group went to work forming the Gospel Music Association and also was partially responsible for the creation of the National Quartet Convention. Sumner also contributed to the group as a songwriter, sometimes writing all the songs for a music album. The Blackwood Brothers were also setting new standards in the studio. Their RCA Victor recordings from this time period are now considered prized collector's items. The lineup with Bill Shaw, James, Cecil, and J.D. Sumner (who for many years was unchallenged as the Guinness World Record holder for having the lowest human voice on record, and was only superseded after Guinness started accepting vocal fry as part of the vocal range) is considered the classic version of the Blackwood Brothers Quartet, with Jackie Marshall or Wally Varner on piano. A replica of the bus can be seen at the Southern Gospel Museum and Hall of Fame at Dollywood in Pigeon Forge, Tennessee

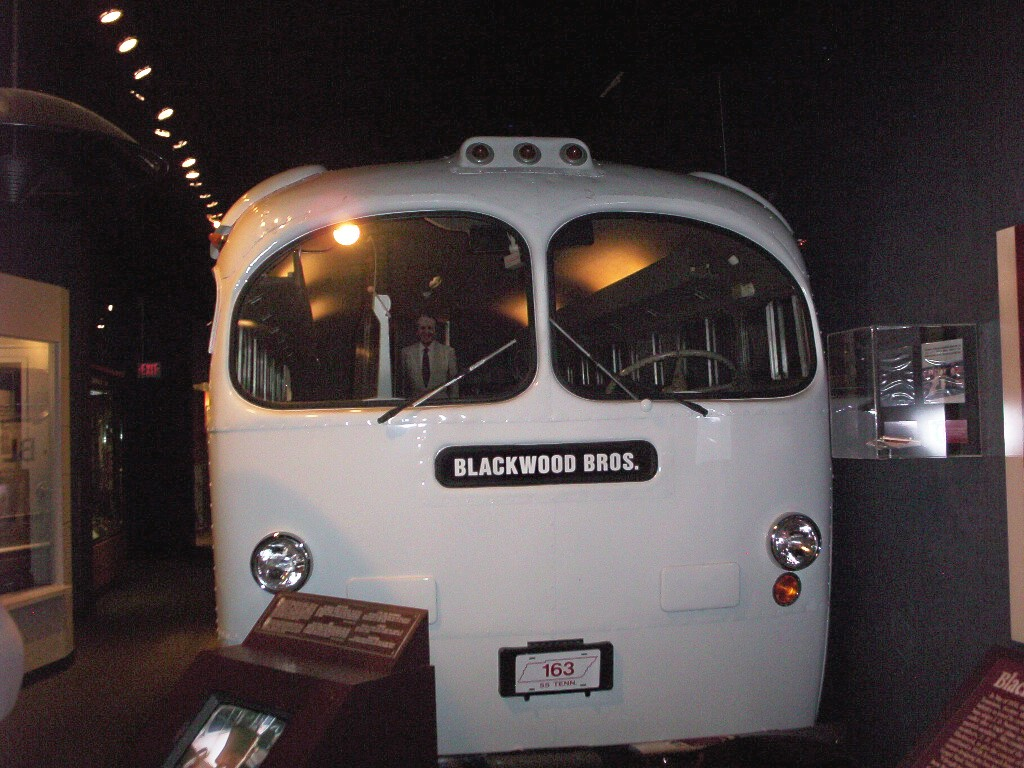
A replica of The Blackwood Brothers' tour bus at the SGMA Museum

== Business ventures ==
The Blackwood Brothers formed a partnership with the Statesmen Quartet (informally known as the "Stateswood" team) to tour as a team in the 1950s, and they were the dominant act on the southern gospel circuit during this time. This dominance lasted for about a decade until the rise of gospel television shows in the late 1960s began to give competing groups wider exposure. The Stateswood team also started the independent record label Skylite Records. At one time, the Skylite roster included The Blackwood Brothers, J.D. Sumner and the Stamps Quartet, Jake Hess and the Imperials, the Speer Family, the Florida Boys, the Couriers Quartet, The Kingsmen Quartet, the Calvarymen Quartet, the Calvary Quartet, the Kingdom Heirs Quartet, the Statesmen Quartet, the Prophets Quartet, the Oak Ridge Boys, the Jordanaires, the Southerners Quartet, and the Rebels Quartet.

== Mainstream success ==
In 1966, the Blackwoods teamed up with Porter Wagoner to record a country influenced gospel album called Grand Old Gospel. It won a Grammy Award for Best Sacred Performance (Musical) and was the first of three albums the Blackwoods recorded with Wagoner. 1967's More Grand Old Gospel won a Grammy for Best Gospel Performance, with the collaboration winning in the same category for 1969's In Gospel Country. The Blackwoods performed with Wagoner for years and were frequent guests in his performances at the Ryman Auditorium. In 1969, James Blackwood's oldest son, James "Jimmy" Blackwood Jr., took over as the main lead singer for the group. Jimmy had been a member of the Junior Blackwood Brothers and the Stamps Quartet. They won another Grammy in 1973 for their project L-O-V-E on the RCA Camden label and then again in 1974 for Release Me From My Sin. The group had 5-7 members at any given time with James Sr. and James Jr. sharing the lead, Bill Shaw and Cecil Blackwood on tenor and baritone, respectively, and John Hall and Conley "London" Parris taking over bass. The 1970s and 1980s lineup with Pat Hoffmaster, Jimmy Blackwood, Cecil Blackwood, Ken Turner and Tommy Fairchild had the Blackwood Brothers' biggest hit with "Learning To Lean". At the 22nd Annual Grammy Awards in 1980 they won another Grammy for Lift Up the Name of Jesus in the Grammy Award for Best Gospel Performance, Traditional category.

== 1980s ==
James Blackwood left the group in 1980 to form the Masters V quartet along with former Blackwood member J. D. Sumner and former Statesmen singers Jake Hess, Rosie Rozell, and Hovie Lister. The group continued and as did their commercial success. At the 23rd Annual Grammy Awards in 1981 We Come To Worship won a Grammy for best traditional gospel recording. It was produced by Cecil Blackwood's son, Mark Blackwood, and incorporated more contemporary sounds to the traditional Blackwood Quartet. At the 25th Annual Grammy Awards in 1983 Im Following You won the group's 8th and final Grammy for best traditional gospel recording. Much like We Come To Worship, it blended elements of newer praise with the traditional southern gospel sound.

== 2000s ==
Cecil Blackwood died in November 2000, and James Blackwood in effect retired the Blackwood Brothers name. Mark Blackwood continued the heritage in grand style with "Mark Blackwood and the Blackwood Gospel Quartet," eventually hiring tenor Wayne Little and bass singer Randy Byrd. In late 2004, Jimmy Blackwood joined Mark, and together they resurrected the Blackwood Brothers.

However, Mark Blackwood left in 2005, reforming his Blackwood Gospel Quartet, and was replaced with Brad White. Jimmy Blackwood, Wayne Little, Brad White, and Randy Byrd remained as the Blackwood Brothers, and appeared on the Gaither Homecoming video Rock of Ages (2008). Soon after that performance, White left and was replaced with Jimmy's younger brother, Billy Blackwood. In 2012, Byrd was replaced with Butch Owens. Also in 2012, Jimmy Blackwood retired and was replaced by Michael Helwig. In 2017, Helwig stepped down as lead singer due to a battle with ALS and was replaced by Jonathan Mattingly.

In 2020, the Blackwood Brothers decided to reduce their touring schedule, and as a result Butch Owens left the group and was replaced at bass by Eric Walker. On January 1, 2022, it was announced that tenor Wayne Little had died aged 60 due to complications from COVID-19.

On January 22, 2023, they performed at the memorial service of Lisa Marie Presley.

== Commercial success ==
The Blackwood Brothers have recorded over 200 albums and sold over 50 million records. They have won eight Grammy Awards, four Dove Awards, and have been inducted into the Grammy Hall of Fame, the Gospel Music Association (GMA) Hall Of Fame, the Southern Gospel Music Association (SGMA) Museum and Hall of Fame, the Memphis Music Hall of Fame.

== Spinoff groups ==
In the latter part of his life and career, James Blackwood formed The James Blackwood Quartet along with Ken Turner at bass, Larry Ford at tenor, and Ray Shelton at baritone. The group performed a short while before folding in the late 1990s. Then, in 1964, Ron Blackwood, the oldest son of RW Blackwood, who was one of the original members of the Blackwood Brothers Quartet and who was killed in the 1954 plane crash, formed The Blackwood Quartet. R.W Blackwood Jr. and Ron Blackwood created the Blackwood Singers in 1963.

== Cultural influence and notable appearances ==
The Blackwood Brothers appeal has reached across the musical spectrum for generations. Elvis Presley named the Blackwood Brothers as his favorite gospel quartet growing up and knew the Blackwood Family personally, often inviting them to his Graceland home just to talk and fellowship even at the height of his popularity. He shared a stage with them in 1955 while on tour for the first time in Texas and refused to sing rock and roll out of respect for, and a desire to sing with his idols. Johnny Cash formed a strong relationship with the Blackwoods and the two acts performed with each other numerous times. Their song "I Was There When It Happened" can be heard singing on the radio towards the beginning of the movie Walk the Line (2005)—when Johnny Cash (played by Joaquin Phoenix) was in Memphis. In the film and according to Cash's autobiography, while auditioning to earn a spot on the Sun Records label in his early career, Cash performed gospel songs that the Blackwoods sang with regularity. They also appeared on The Johnny Cash Show and performed in 1971. At the end of the 2008 biopic film W., the Blackwood's rendition of "Winging My Way Back Home" was played. Currently, The Blackwood Quartet has been a frequent act with Willie Nelson and his Farmaid musical festival, usually closing out the festival with a rendition of "I'll Fly Away." Ron Blackwood recently negotiated with Willie Nelson to record a Gospel Album with Mark Blackwood and The Blackwood Quartet to be released on Sony Records in late 2017. Ron has been in serious discussions with regards to recording an album with the Blackwood Quartet and Bob Dylan. Dylan spoke about the record at the 57th Annual Grammy Awards when he was named MusiCares Person of the Year in 2015 and in his speech expressed his desire to make another gospel album and the desire to sing the traditional gospel song "Stand By Me" on that album. On January 20, 2023, the Blackwood Brothers announced that, just as it had been the case when Gladys Presley died, in 1958 as well as when Elvis Presley died, in 1977, that they had been invited by the Presley family to sing at Lisa Marie Presley's Public Memorial Services, to be held at the Graceland lawn on January 22, 2023. Ron Blackwood died in June 2025 at the age of 84.

== Members (past and present) ==
=== Line-ups ===
1934–1938 (Under the Name "The Blackwood Brothers")	1938–1939	1939
Roy Blackwood – tenor; James Blackwood – lead; R.W. Blackwood – baritone; Doyle Blackwood – bass	Roy Blackwood – tenor; James Blackwood – lead; R.W. Blackwood – baritone; Doyle Blackwood – bass; Joe Roper – piano	Roy Blackwood – tenor; James Blackwood – lead; R.W. Blackwood – baritone; Doyle Blackwood – bass; Wallace Milligan – piano
1939–1940	1940–1942	1942–1944
Roy Blackwood – tenor; James Blackwood – lead; RW Blackwood – baritone; Doyle Blackwood – bass; Marion Snider – piano	Roy Blackwood – tenor; James Blackwood – lead; R.W. Blackwood – baritone; Doyle Blackwood – bass; Hilton Griswold – piano	Roy Blackwood – tenor; James Blackwood – lead; RW Blackwood – baritone; Don Smith – bass; Hilton Griswold – piano
1944–1946	1946–1947	1947–1948
Roy Blackwood – tenor; James Blackwood – lead; Hilton Griswold – baritone/piano; Don Smith – bass	Roy Blackwood – tenor; James Blackwood – lead; R.W. Blackwood – baritone; Don Smith – bass; Hilton Griswold – piano	Roy Blackwood – tenor; James Blackwood – lead; R.W. Blackwood – baritone; Bill Lyles – bass; Hilton Griswold – piano
1948	1948–1949	1949–1950
Calvin Newton – tenor; James Blackwood – lead; R.W. Blackwood – baritone; Bill Lyles – bass; Hilton Griswold – piano	Cat Freeman – tenor; James Blackwood – lead; R.W. Blackwood – baritone; Bill Lyles – bass; Hilton Griswold – piano	Alden Toney – tenor; James Blackwood – lead; R.W. Blackwood – baritone; Bill Lyles – bass; Hilton Griswold – piano
1950–1951	1951–1952	1952–1954
Alden Toney – tenor; James Blackwood – lead; R.W. Blackwood – baritone; Bill Lyles – bass; Jack Marshall – piano	Dan Huskey – tenor; James Blackwood – lead; R.W. Blackwood – baritone; Bill Lyles – bass; Jack Marshall – piano	Bill Shaw – tenor; James Blackwood – lead; R.W. Blackwood – baritone; Bill Lyles – bass; Jack Marshall – piano
1954–1958	1958–1964	1964–1965
Bill Shaw – tenor; James Blackwood – lead; Cecil Stamps Blackwood – baritone; J. D. Sumner – bass; Jack Marshall – piano	Bill Shaw – tenor; James Blackwood – lead; Cecil Stamps Blackwood – baritone; J. D. Sumner – bass; Wally Varner – piano	Bill Shaw – tenor; James Blackwood – lead; Cecil Stamps Blackwood – baritone; J. D. Sumner – bass; Whitey Gleason – piano
1965–1966	1966–1968	1968–1970
Bill Shaw – tenor; James Blackwood – lead; Cecil Stamps Blackwood – baritone; John Hall – bass; Whitey Gleason – piano	Bill Shaw – tenor; James Blackwood – lead; Cecil Stamps Blackwood – baritone; John Hall – bass; Dave Weston – piano	Bill Shaw – tenor; James Blackwood – lead; Cecil Stamps Blackwood – baritone; London Parris – bass; Peter Kaups – piano; Dwayne Friend – guitars
1970–1971	1971–1972	1972–1973
Bill Shaw – tenor; James Blackwood – lead; Cecil Stamps Blackwood – baritone; London Parris – bass; Tony Brown – piano; Larry Davis – bass guitar; Billy Blackwood – drums	Bill Shaw – tenor; James Blackwood – lead; Cecil Stamps Blackwood – baritone; Ken Turner – bass; Tommy Fairchild – piano; Larry Davis – bass guitar; Billy Blackwood – drums	Bill Shaw – tenor; James Blackwood – lead; Jimmy Blackwood – lead; Cecil Stamps Blackwood – baritone; Ken Turner – bass; Tommy Fairchild – piano; Larry Davis – bass guitar; Billy Blackwood – drums
1973–1979	1979–1980	1980–1981
Pat Hoffmaster – tenor; James Blackwood – lead; Jimmy Blackwood – lead; Cecil Stamps Blackwood – baritone; Ken Turner – bass; Tommy Fairchild – piano	John Cox – tenor; James Blackwood – lead; Jimmy Blackwood – lead; Cecil Stamps Blackwood – baritone; Ken Turner – bass; Tommy Fairchild – piano	Pat Hoffmaster – tenor; James Blackwood – lead; Jimmy Blackwood – lead; Cecil Stamps Blackwood – baritone; Ken Turner – bass; Tommy Fairchild – piano
1981–1983	1983–1984	1984–1985
Pat Hoffmaster – tenor; Jimmy Blackwood – lead; Cecil Stamps Blackwood – baritone; Ken Turner – bass; Tommy Fairchild – piano	Robert Crawford – tenor; Jimmy Blackwood – lead; Cecil Stamps Blackwood – baritone; Ken Turner – bass; Jeff Stice – piano	Rick Price – tenor; R. W. Blackwood Jr. – tenor/lead; Jimmy Blackwood – lead; Cecil Stamps Blackwood – baritone; Ken Turner – bass; Jeff Stice – piano
1985–1986	1986–1987	1987–1988
Rick Price – tenor; R. W. Blackwood Jr. – tenor/lead; Jimmy Blackwood – lead; Cecil Stamps Blackwood – baritone; Ken Turner – bass	Jerry Trammell – tenor; R. W. Blackwood Jr. – lead; Cecil Stamps Blackwood – baritone; Ken Turner – bass	Terry Edwards – tenor; Mark Blackwood – lead; Cecil Stamps Blackwood – baritone; Ken Turner – bass
1988–1989	1989	1989–1990
Mike Loprinzi – tenor; Mark Blackwood – lead; Cecil Stamps Blackwood – baritone; Ken Turner – bass	Darren Krauter – tenor; Mark Blackwood – lead; Cecil Stamps Blackwood – baritone; Cecil Stringer – bass	Darren Krauter – tenor; Mark Blackwood – lead; Cecil Stamps Blackwood – baritone; Cecil Stringer – bass
1990–1992	1992–1994	1994–1996
R. W. Blackwood Jr. – tenor; Mark Blackwood – lead; Mike Loprinzi – lead; Cecil Stamps Blackwood – baritone; Jeff McMahon – bass; Tommy Fairchild – piano	Steve Warren – tenor; Mark Blackwood – lead; Cecil Stamps Blackwood – baritone; Eric Winston – bass	Paul Acree – tenor; Mark Blackwood – lead; Cecil Stamps Blackwood – baritone; Eric Winston – bass
1996–1997	1997–1998	1998–1999
Paul Acree – tenor; Tony Peace – lead; Cecil Stamps Blackwood – baritone; Eric Winston – bass	Tracy Trent – tenor; Mike Loprinzi – lead; Cecil Stamps Blackwood – baritone; Eric Winston – bass	Steve Warren – tenor, lead; Mike Loprinzi – lead; Cecil Stamps Blackwood – baritone; Eric Winston – bass; Chris Blackwood – additional vocals
1999–2000	2000–2004	2004–2005
Steve Warren – tenor, lead; Rick Price – lead; Cecil Stamps Blackwood – baritone; Eric Winston – bass; Chris Blackwood – additional vocals	disbanded before 2004	Wayne Little – tenor; Jimmy Blackwood – lead; Mark Blackwood – baritone; Randy Byrd – bass; Brad White – piano
2005–2009	2009–2012	2012–2017
Wayne Little – tenor; Jimmy Blackwood – lead; Brad White – baritone/piano; Randy Byrd – bass	Wayne Little – tenor; Jimmy Blackwood – lead; Billy Blackwood – baritone; Randy Byrd – bass; Mike Hammontree – piano	Wayne Little – tenor; Michael Helwig – lead; Billy Blackwood – baritone; Butch Owens – bass
2017–2021	2021	2022–Present
Wayne Little – tenor; Jonathan Mattingly – lead; Billy Blackwood – baritone; Butch Owens – bass	Wayne Little – tenor; Jonathan Mattingly – lead; Billy Blackwood – baritone; Eric Walker – bass	Jim Rogers – tenor; Jonathan Mattingly – lead; Billy Blackwood – baritone; Eric Walker – bass

=== In Memorian ===
- Cecil Stamps Blackwood (October 28, 1934 - November 13, 2000)
- Doyle Blackwood (August 21, 1911 - October 3, 1974)
- James Blackwood (August 4, 1919 - February 3, 2002)
- Roy Blackwood (December 24, 1900 - March 21, 1971)
- R.W. Blackwood (October 23, 1921 - June 30, 1954)
- Cat Freeman (March 11, 1922 - March 21, 1989)
- William "Covie" Gecovia Garner (July 5, 1935 - August 4, 2010)
- Whitey Gleason (May 18, 1932 - June 30, 2007)
- Hilton Griswold (November 12, 1921 - May 5, 2015)
- John Hall (February 7, 1939 - September 29, 2020)
- Mike Hammontree (d. May 22, 2021)
- Michael Helwig (December 6, 1976 - December 24, 2023)
- Pat Hoffmaster (July 7, 1948 - December 31, 1988)
- Wayne Little (November 10, 1961 - January 1, 2022)
- Bill Lyles (December 7, 1920 - June 30, 1954)
- Jackie Marshall (July 24, 1930 – August 27, 2018)
- Calvin Newton (October 28, 1929 - March 3, 2023)
- London Parris (May 25, 1931 - September 7, 1992)
- Joe Roper (July 10, 1919 - November 3, 1990)
- Bill Shaw (June 22, 1924 - September 7, 2018)
- Marion Snider (1914 - November 14, 2010)
- Jeff Stice (May 30, 1960 – September 14, 2021)
- J.D. Sumner (November 19, 1924 - November 16, 1998)
- Alden Toney (d. October 21, 2007)
- Wally Varner (January 13, 1926 - December 28, 2004)

== Awards ==
=== Grammy Awards ===
- 9th Annual Grammy Awards: Best Sacred Performance (Musical) – Grand Old Gospel (with Porter Wagoner)
- 10th Annual Grammy Awards: Best Gospel Performance – More Grand Old Gospel (with Porter Wagoner)
- 12th Annual Grammy Awards: Best Gospel Performance – In Gospel Country (with Porter Wagoner)
- 15th Annual Grammy Awards: Best Gospel Performance (Other Than Soul Gospel) – L-O-V-E
- 16th Annual Grammy Awards: Best Gospel Performance (Other Than Soul Gospel) – Release Me (From My Sin)
- 22nd Annual Grammy Awards: Best Gospel Performance, Traditional – Lift Up The Name Of Jesus
- 23rd Annual Grammy Awards: Best Gospel Performance, Traditional – We Come To Worship
- 25th Annual Grammy Awards: Best Gospel Performance, Traditional – I'm Following You

=== GMA Dove Awards ===
- 1970: Album of the Year – Fill My Cup, Lord
- 1971: Album of the Year – My God and I (Nullified due to ballot stuffing)
- 1973: Male Group of the Year
- 1974: Male Group of the Year
- 1974: Associate Membership Award
- 1976: Associate Membership Award
- 1977: Associate Membership Award
