= Masters V =

Former Southern Gospel Group

- Origin: United States
- Genres: Southern gospel, Contemporary christian music
- Years active: 1980–1988
- Label: Skylite
- Past members: Hovie Lister; J. D. Sumner; James Blackwood; Jake Hess; Rosie Rozell; Steve Warren; Sherrill Nielsen; Buddy Burton; Tommy Howe; Jack Toney; Ed Hill; CJ Almgren

The Masters Five or Masters V was a Southern Gospel Music quartet founded in 1980 by Hovie Lister as a special consolidation of well-known performers from The Statesmen Quartet and The Blackwood Brothers. The group featured J.D. Sumner as bass, Rosie Rozell and then Steve Warren as tenor, James Blackwood and Jake Hess alternating between lead and baritone, and Lister on piano. Their self-titled debut album, The Masters V, won the 1981 Grammy Award for best traditional gospel performance. The quartet subsequently endured several personnel changes, often due to health and age-related issues. The group's final performance was in 1988.

== Discography ==
- The Masters V (1981) Skylite SLP 6256; reissued as How Great Thou Art (1988) Temple Records
- O What a Savior (1982 ) Skylite SLP 6265 (Rozell, Blackwood, Hess, Sumner, Lister)
- The Masters V Present Their Majestic Bass, J.D. Sumner (1982) Skylite
- The Legendary Masters V (1982) Skylite SLP 6282 (Rozell, Blackwood, Hess, Sumner, Lister)
- Featuring… (1983) Skylite (Nielsen, Blackwood, Hess, Sumner, Lister)
- Live at the Joyful Noise (1983) Skylite (Nielsen, Blackwood, Hess, Sumner, Lister)
- Thru the Years (1984) Skylite (Warren, Blackwood, Hess, Sumner, Lister)
- Good Things (1984) Skylite (Warren, Blackwood, Hess, Sumner, Lister)
- The Master’s Hymns (1985) Skylite (Warren, Blackwood, Hess, Sumner, Lister)
- The Masters V Present Their Magnificent Bass, J.D. Sumner (1985) Skylite (Warren, Blackwood, Hess, Sumner, Lister)
- Sing Fabulous Blackwood Brothers Hits (1985) Skylite (Warren, Blackwood, Hess, Sumner, Lister)
- The Masters V Present 50 Years with the Fabulous James Blackwood (1985) Skylite Records
- Classics of Yesteryear (1986) Skylite SLP 6363 (Warren, Blackwood, Hess, Sumner, Lister)
- Have a Little Faith (1986) Merinet
- Sing Me a Song About Jesus (1987) Riversong (Warren, Blackwood, Hess, Sumner, Lister)
- The Legend Lives On (1988) Skylite (Nielsen, Toney, Hill, Sumner, Lister)
- Sing Award Winning Songs of JD Sumner (1988) Skylite (Nielsen, Toney, Hill, Sumner, Lister)
- Superlative Bass JD Sumner (1988) (Nielsen, Toney, Hill, Sumner, Lister)
- The Original Masters Five (1991) Bibletone Records

== Members ==
=== Line-ups ===
1980–1982	1982–1984	1984–1988
Rosie Rozell – tenor; Jake Hess – lead/baritone; James Blackwood – baritone/lead; Richard Coltrane – baritone; J. D. Sumner – bass; Hovie Lister – piano/vocals	Shaun Nielsen – tenor; Jake Hess – lead/baritone; James Blackwood – baritone/lead; Richard Coltrane – baritone; J. D. Sumner – bass; Hovie Lister – piano/vocals	Steve Warren – tenor vocals/various studio instruments; Jake Hess – lead/baritone; Tommy Howe – lead/baritone (1987); James Blackwood – baritone/lead; Richard Coltrane – baritone; J. D. Sumner – bass; Tommy Thompson – bass (1987); Hovie Lister – piano/vocals
1988 (later transitioned to "J.D. Sumner and The Stamps")
Shaun Nielsen – tenor; Jack Toney – lead; Ed Hill – baritone; J. D. Sumner – bass; Hovie Lister – piano/vocals; CJ Almgren – piano (1988)

- Hovie Lister 1980–1988
- J.D. Sumner 1980–1988
- James Blackwood 1980–1987
- Jake Hess 1980–1987
- Rosie Rozell 1980–1983
- Shaun Nielsen 1983/1988
- Steve Warren 1984–1987
- Chris Hess
- Tommy Thompson
- Buddy Burton
- Charles Yates
- Ed Hill 1987–1988
- Jack Toney 1988
