= 25th Annual Grammy Awards =

1983 US music awards ceremony

- Date: February 23, 1983
- Location: Shrine Auditorium, Los Angeles
- Hosted by: John Denver
- Most awards: John Williams (3)
- Most nominations: Toto (8)

Television/radio coverage
- Network: CBS

The 25th Annual Grammy Awards were held on February 23, 1983, at Shrine Auditorium, Los Angeles. They recognized accomplishments by musicians from the previous year.

Album of the Year went to Toto for Toto IV, and Song of the Year went to Johnny Christopher, Mark James and Wayne Carson for "Always on My Mind".

== Presenters ==
- Stevie Wonder & Dionne Warwick - Album of the Year
- Bill Ivey - Presented Les Paul with the Trustees Award
- Lionel Richie & Olivia Newton-John - Record of the Year
- George Carlin & Michael McDonald - Best Female Rock Performance
- Lily Tomlin & Tony Bennett - Best New Artist
- Quincy Jones & Donna Summer - Best Pop Vocal Performance Duo/Group & Best Pop Vocal Performance Female
- Henry Mancini - Best Male Pop Vocal Performance & Song of the Year
- Rick James & Grace Jones - Best Female R&B Vocal Performance
- Rick Moranis & Dave Thomas as Bob and Doug McKenzie - Rules & Voting Procedure

== Performers ==
- Ray Charles, Count Basie, Jerry Lee Lewis, and Little Richard - What I'd Say/One O'Clock Jump/Whole Lotta Shakin' Goin' On/Joy, Joy, Joy/Wish You Were Here Tonight
- Joe Cocker & Jennifer Warnes - Up Where We Belong
- Kenny Rogers - Through the Years
- Marvin Gaye - Sexual Healing
- Men At Work - Down Under
- Eddie Murphy
- Willie Nelson - Always On My Mind
- Alabama - Gonna Have A Party
- Lena Horne - Believe In Yourself (Reprise)
- Harvey & the Moonglows - Ten Commandments of Love
- Gladys Knight & the Pips - Heard It Through the Grapevine
- The Spinners - Mighty Love
- Leontyne Price - Vissi d'arte
- Linda Ronstadt - Get Closer
- Bill Monroe - Muleskinner Blues
- Masters V - I'll Fly Away
- Crystal Gayle - Don't It Make My Brown Eyes Blue
- Ricky Skaggs - Don't Get Above Your Raisin'
- Miles Davis - You're Under Arrest

== Awards ==
=== General ===
Record of the Year

- "Rosanna" – Toto
  - Toto, producer
- "Always on My Mind" - Willie Nelson
  - Chips Moman, producer
- "Chariots of Fire" - Vangelis
  - Vangelis, producer
- "Ebony and Ivory" - Paul McCartney & Stevie Wonder
  - George Martin, producer
- "Steppin' Out" - Joe Jackson
  - David Kershenbaum & Joe Jackson, producers

Album of the Year

- Toto IV – Toto
  - Toto, producer
- American Fool - John Cougar
  - John Mellencamp & Don Gehman, producers
- The Nightfly - Donald Fagen
  - Gary Katz, producer
- The Nylon Curtain - Billy Joel
  - Phil Ramone, producer
- Tug of War - Paul McCartney
  - George Martin, producer

Song of the Year

- "Always on My Mind"
  - Johnny Christopher, Mark James & Wayne Carson, songwriters (Willie Nelson)
- "Ebony and Ivory"
  - Paul McCartney, songwriter (Paul McCartney & Stevie Wonder)
- "Rosanna"
  - David Paich, songwriter (Toto)
- "Eye of the Tiger"
  - Frankie Sullivan & Jim Peterik, songwriters (Survivor)
- "I.G.Y. (What a Beautiful World)"
  - Donald Fagen, songwriter (Donald Fagan)

Best New Artist

- Men at Work
- Asia
- Jennifer Holliday
- The Human League
- Stray Cats

=== Blues ===
- Best Traditional Blues Recording
  - Clarence "Gatemouth" Brown for Alright Again

=== Children's ===
- Best Recording for Children
  - David Levine & Lucy Simon (producers) for In Harmony 2 performed by various artists

=== Classical ===
- Best Orchestral Performance
  - Jay David Saks, Thomas Z. Shepard (producers), James Levine (conductor) & the Chicago Symphony Orchestra for Mahler: Sym. No. 7 in E Min. (Song of the Night)
- Best Classical Vocal Soloist Performance
  - Zubin Mehta (conductor), Leontyne Price & the Israel Philharmonic Orchestra for Verdi: Arias (Leontyne Price Sings Verdi)
- Best Opera Recording
  - Andrew Kazdin (producer), Pierre Boulez (conductor), Jeannine Altmeyer, Hermann Becht, Peter Hofmann, Siegfried Jerusalem, Gwyneth Jones, Manfred Jung, Donald McIntyre, Matti Salminen, Ortrun Wenkel, Heinz Zednik & the Bayreuth Festival Orchestra for Wagner: Der Ring des Nibelungen
- Best Choral Performance (other than opera)
  - Georg Solti (conductor), Margaret Hillis (choir director) & the Chicago Symphony Orchestra & Chorus for Berlioz: La Damnation de Faust
- Best Classical Performance, Instrumental Soloist (with orchestra)
  - Daniel Barenboim (conductor), Itzhak Perlman & the Chicago Symphony Orchestra for Elgar: Violin Concerto in B Minor
- Best Classical Performance, Instrumental Soloist (without orchestra)
  - Glenn Gould for Bach: The Goldberg Variations
- Best Chamber Music Performance
  - Richard Goode & Richard Stoltzman for Brahms: The Sonatas for Clarinet & Piano, Op. 120
- Best Classical Album
  - Samuel H. Carter (producer) & Glenn Gould for Bach: The Goldberg Variations

=== Comedy ===
- Best Comedy Recording
  - Richard Pryor for Live on the Sunset Strip

=== Composing and arranging ===
- Best Instrumental Composition
  - John Williams (composer) for "Flying - Theme From "E.T. the Extra-Terrestrial"
- Best Album of Original Score Written for a Motion Picture or Television Special
  - John Williams (composer) for E.T. the Extra-Terrestrial
- Best Arrangement on an Instrumental Recording
  - John Williams (arranger) for "Flying - Theme From "E.T. the Extra-Terrestrial"
- Best Instrumental Arrangement Accompanying Vocal(s)
  - Jerry Hey & David Paich, Jeff Porcaro (arrangers) for "Rosanna" performed by Toto
- Best Vocal Arrangement for Two or More Voices
  - David Paich (arranger) for "Rosanna" performed by Toto

=== Country ===
- Best Country Vocal Performance, Female
  - Juice Newton for "Break It to Me Gently"
- Best Country Vocal Performance, Male
  - Willie Nelson for "Always on My Mind"
- Best Country Performance by a Duo or Group with Vocal
  - Alabama for Mountain Music
- Best Country Instrumental Performance
  - Roy Clark for "Alabama Jubilee"
- Best Country Song
  - Wayne Carson, Johnny Christopher & Mark James (songwriters) for "Always on My Mind" performed by Willie Nelson

=== Folk ===
- Best Ethnic or Traditional Folk Recording
  - Queen Ida for Queen Ida & the Bon Temps Zydeco Band on Tour

=== Gospel ===
- Best Gospel Performance, Traditional
  - Blackwood Brothers for I'm Following You
- Best Gospel Performance, Contemporary
  - Amy Grant for Age to Age
- Best Soul Gospel Performance, Traditional
  - Al Green for Precious Lord
- Best Soul Gospel Performance, Contemporary
  - Al Green for Higher Plane
- Best Inspirational Performance
  - Barbara Mandrell for He Set My Life to Music

=== Historical ===
- Best Historical Album
  - Alan Dell, Ethel Gabriel & Don Wardell (producers) for The Tommy Dorsey/Frank Sinatra Sessions - Vols.1,2 & 3

=== Jazz ===
- Best Jazz Vocal Performance, Female
  - Sarah Vaughan for Gershwin Live!
- Best Jazz Vocal Performance, Male
  - Mel Tormé for An Evening with George Shearing & Mel Tormé
- Best Jazz Vocal Performance, Duo or Group
  - The Manhattan Transfer for "Route 66"
- Best Jazz Instrumental Performance, Soloist
  - Miles Davis for We Want Miles
- Best Instrumental Jazz Performance, Group
  - Phil Woods for "More" Live
- Best Jazz Instrumental Performance, Big Band
  - Count Basie for Warm Breeze
- Best Jazz Fusion Performance, Vocal or Instrumental
  - Pat Metheny Group for Offramp

=== Latin ===
- Best Latin Recording
  - Machito for Machito & His Salsa Big Band '82

=== Musical show ===
- Best Cast Show Album
  - Henry Krieger (composer), Tom Eyen (lyricist), David Foster (producer) & various artists for Dreamgirls

=== Music video ===
- Best Video of the Year
  - Olivia Newton-John for Physical

=== Packaging and notes ===
- Best Album Package
  - John Kosh & Ron Larson (art directors) for Get Closer performed by Linda Ronstadt
- Best Album Notes
  - John Chilton & Richard M. Sudhalter (notes writers) for Bunny Berigan - Giants Of Jazz performed by Bunny Berigan

=== Pop ===
- Best Pop Vocal Performance, Female
  - Melissa Manchester for "You Should Hear How She Talks About You"
- Best Pop Vocal Performance, Male
  - Lionel Richie for "Truly"
- Best Pop Performance by a Duo or Group with Vocal
  - Joe Cocker & Jennifer Warnes for "Up Where We Belong"
- Best Pop Instrumental Performance
  - Ernie Watts for "Chariots of Fire Theme (Dance Version)"

=== Production and engineering ===
- Best Engineered Recording, Non-Classical
  - Al Schmitt, David Leonard, Greg Ladanyi & Tom Knox (engineers) for Toto IV performed by Toto
- Best Classical Engineered Recording
  - Paul Goodman (engineer), James Levine (conductor) & the Chicago Symphony Orchestra for Mahler: Symphony No. 7 in E Minor (Song of the Night)
- Producer of the Year
  - Toto
- Classical Producer of the Year
  - Robert Woods

=== R&B ===
- Best R&B Vocal Performance, Female
  - Jennifer Holliday for "And I Am Telling You (I'm Not Going)"
- Best R&B Vocal Performance, Male
  - Marvin Gaye for "Sexual Healing"
- Best R&B Performance by a Duo or Group with Vocal
  - Dazz Band for "Let It Whip"
  - Earth, Wind & Fire for "Wanna Be with You"
- Best R&B Instrumental Performance
  - Marvin Gaye for "Sexual Healing (Instrumental Version)"
- Best Rhythm & Blues Song
  - Bill Champlin, Jay Graydon & Steve Lukather (songwriters) for "Turn Your Love Around" performed by George Benson

=== Rock ===
- Best Rock Vocal Performance, Female
  - Pat Benatar for "Shadows of the Night"
- Best Rock Vocal Performance, Male
  - John Cougar Mellencamp for "Hurts So Good"
- Best Rock Performance by a Duo or Group with Vocal
  - Survivor for "Eye of the Tiger"
- Best Rock Instrumental Performance
  - A Flock of Seagulls for "D.N.A."

=== Spoken ===
- Best Spoken Word, Documentary or Drama Recording
  - Tom Voegeli (producer) for Raiders of the Lost Ark - The Movie on Record performed by various artists
