= Grammy Award for Best Gospel Performance, Traditional =

American music industry award

The Grammy Award for Best Gospel Performance, Traditional was awarded from 1978 to 1983. Before and after this time from 1968 to 1977 and from 2005 this category was a part of the Grammy Award for Best Gospel/Contemporary Christian Music Performance.

Years reflect the year in which the Grammy Awards were presented, for works released in the previous year.

== Recipients ==
Year	Winner(s)	Title	Nominees	Ref.
1978	Oak Ridge Boys	Just a Little Talk With Jesus	Blackwood Brothers for Bill Gaithers Songs; The Speers for Cornerstone; Rambos for Naturally; Cathedral Quartet for Then and Now; The LeFevres for Till He Comes	
1979	The Happy Goodman Family	Refreshing	J.D. Summer & the Stamps Quartet for Elvis' Favorite Gospel Songs; Blackwood Brothers for His Amazing Love; Cathedral Quartet for Sunshine and Roses; George Beverly Shea for The Old Rugged Cross	
1980	Blackwood Brothers	Lift Up the Name of Jesus	Dottie Rambo Choir for A Choral Concert of Love; Mercy River Boys for Breakout; Rex Nelon Singers for Feelings; Cathedral Quartet for You Ain't Heard Nothing Yet!	
1981	Blackwood Brothers	We Come to Worship	Rambos for Crossin' Over; Kenneth Copeland for In His Presence; Lanny Wolfe Trio for Make a Joyful Noise...; Jimmy Swaggart for Worship	
1982	The Masters V	The Masters V	Lanny Wolfe Trio for Can't Stop the Music; Rusty Goodman for Escape to the Light; Happy Goodman Family for Goin' Higher; Rambos for Rambo Reunion	
1983	Blackwood Brothers	I'm Following You	Rex Nelon Singers for Feeling At Home; Dottie Rambo for Makin My Own Place; Cathedrals for Something Special; The Masters V for O, What Savior	
