= Eva Mae LeFevre =

- Born: August 7, 1917; McColl, South Carolina, U.S.
- Died: May 18, 2009 (aged 91) Atlanta, Georgia, U.S.
- Genre: Southern gospel
- Occupation: Gospel musician
- Years active: 1934–1977 (with The LeFevres); 1991–2009 (Gaither Homecoming)
- Formerly of: The LeFevres
- Spouse: Urias LeFevre (m. 1934; died 1979)

Eva Mae LeFevre (née Whittington; August 7, 1917 – May 18, 2009) was an American southern gospel musician. She was considered a "pioneer of gospel music" and was dubbed the "First Lady of Gospel Music". LeFevre led a career which lasted four decades with The LeFevres. She gained additional notoriety for her appearances on the Gaither Homecoming tapings throughout the 1990s and 2000s.

== Early life ==
Eva Mae LeFevre (née Whittington) was born August 7, 1917 in McColl, South Carolina. Her father, Reverend H. L. Whittington, was a Church of God revivalist and church planter. She was a child prodigy and began playing the piano and organ at an early age. Reportedly, she was able to play the instruments by ear at age six.

== Career ==
She married Urias LeFevre in 1934 at Tremont Avenue Church of God in Greenville, South Carolina. Urias already started the LeFevres singing duo with his brother, Alphus, in 1921. She later joined the LeFevre family as its alto and pianist.

The LeFevres moved to Atlanta in 1939 and began performing locally. Soon after, they struck a contract with local radio station WGST and hosted a weekly singing broadcast.

During World War II, Urias and his brother were drafted to serve in the U.S. military. LeFevre remained stateside and continued to sing with the Homeland Harmony Quartet and raise her three children, Pierce, Meurice, and Andrea.

In 1960s, Eva and the LeFevres starred in a weekly syndicated television program The Gospel Singing Caravan, which made them a household name.

In 1988, she became the first gospel music artist to be inducted into the Georgia Music Hall of Fame.

She appeared on the majority of Gaither Homecoming videos and related recordings, having been one of the first artists to be featured on the video series upon its first taping in 1991.

== Awards ==
- Gospel Music Hall of Fame (1977; First woman to be inducted)
- Georgia Music Hall of Fame (1988; First gospel artist to be inducted)
- SGMA Hall of Fame (1997)

== Personal life and death ==
Her husband Urias died in 1979. They had five children, including Mylon LeFevre, a prominent Christian rock singer.

LeFevre died on May 18, 2009 at age 91 in Atlanta, Georgia. She had been hospitalized a month prior due to pneumonia and a hip fracture. She was buried at Westview Cemetery in Atlanta.
