= J. D. Sumner =

American gospel singer, songwriter, and music promoter (1924–1998)

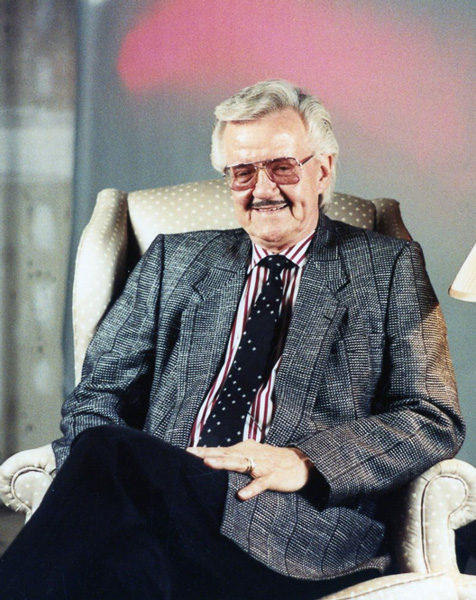

Background information
- Born: John Daniel Sumner; November 19, 1924; Lakeland, Florida, United States
- Died: November 16, 1998 (aged 73) Myrtle Beach, South Carolina, U.S.
- Genres: Southern Gospel, Country, Rock & Roll, Pop, Gospel, Contemporary Christian
- Occupations: Singer, Songwriter, Vocalist, Music Promoter, & Performer
- Instrument: Vocals
- Years active: 1945–1998
- Labels: Skylite, Heartwarming, Masters, RCA, Riversong, Merinet, Vista, QCA, Crystal, Arrival, Spring Hill, NuSong, New Haven

John Daniel Sumner (November 19, 1924 – November 16, 1998) was an American gospel singer, songwriter, and music promoter noted for his bass voice, and his innovation in the Christian and Gospel music fields. Sumner sang in five quartets and was a member of the Blackwood Brothers during their 1950s heyday. Aside from his incredibly low bass voice, Sumner's business acumen helped promote Southern Gospel and move it into the mainstream of American culture and music during the 1950s and 1960s.

== Career ==
=== Sunny South Quartet and Dixie Lily Harmoneers ===
J. D. Sumner first sang with the Sunny South Quartet from 1945 to 1948. The quartet was headquartered in Tampa, Florida, and was sponsored by the Dixie Lily Flour Company. In 1949, Sunny South manager Horace Floyd relocated the quartet to Orlando, but Sumner stayed behind in Tampa where he maintained the sponsorship and started a new group, the Dixie Lily Harmoneers, which he sang with for a few months.

=== Sunshine Boys ===
Later in 1949, J. D. Sumner left the Dixie Lily Harmoneers and moved up to Atlanta, Georgia, where he joined the Sunshine Boys. They split their time between Atlanta and Wheeling, West Virginia, with the occasional trip to Hollywood to sing in Western movies. The lineup of Fred Daniel on tenor, Ed Wallace on lead, Ace Richman on baritone, and J. D. on bass continued on for five years until June 30, 1954.

=== Blackwood Brothers Quartet ===
On June 30, 1954, tragedy struck the Blackwood Brothers Quartet when a disastrous test run in their private plane cost the lives of baritone R. W. Blackwood and bass singer Bill Lyles.

J. D. Sumner was immediately hired by the Blackwood Brothers to sing with them to replace Lyles. Cecil Blackwood joined at the same time to replace his brother R. W. on baritone. J. D. sang with the Blackwood Brothers Quartet from 1954 until 1965. He also established the National Quartet Convention along with James Blackwood to showcase the various quartets in the industry and the convention became an annual festival and mainstay in the industry that continues to this day. It was also during this time he met Elvis Presley. Presley lived in Memphis, Tennessee, as a young boy and would attend the all night sings at The Ellis Auditorium. Presley was an avid fan of Southern Gospel music and groups such as the Blackwood Brothers and the Statesmen Quartet. Sumner recalled that Presley had missed a concert one month, and Sumner inquired why he did not attend. Presley replied he had no money to get into the show, and Sumner said "Son you come find me when you want to get in, money or not." Sumner then told his group mates to let Presley in the back stage door so he could attend. Years later, Presley would try out for the Songfellows Quartet, a group associated with the Blackwood Brothers, though did not receive an invitation to join. Shortly thereafter, Presley recorded a demo at Sun Records in Memphis which launched his legendary rock and roll career.

=== The Stamps Quartet ===
In 1962, J. D. Sumner became the manager of the Stamps Quartet, and three years later, he left the Blackwood Brothers to sing with them. Sumner was most noted as the leader of the Stamps Quartet, which became known as J. D. Sumner & the Stamps. As a teenager, Elvis Presley idolized Sumner's singing after seeing him perform with the Sunshine Boys. Presley hired Sumner & the Stamps (which included future Oak Ridge Boys' bass singer Richard Sterban) as back-up singers in 1971. The Stamps toured and recorded with Presley from 1971 until Presley's death in 1977. Sumner not only sang at Elvis' funeral but had previously sung at the funeral of Elvis' mother Gladys in 1958. J. D. and the Stamps opened for Jerry Lee Lewis in 1980 in the United Kingdom, the Stamps only overseas performance.

=== Masters V ===
After the Stamps Quartet disbanded in 1980, Sumner with Hovie Lister, Jake Hess, Rosie Rozell, and James Blackwood formed the Masters V as a special consolidation of members of the Blackwood Brothers Quartet and Statesmen Quartet. The group was a showcase for Sumner's voice and compositions and won the 1981 Grammy Award for best traditional gospel performance. Sumner was credited not only for his singing, songwriting, and concert promotions, but was also noted for being the first to customize a coach bus for the entertainment business to use for music groups.

=== Later career with Stamps ===
After the Masters V disbanded in 1988, Sumner reformed the Stamps Quartet and performed with the group until his death in 1998. He was often seen in his later years appearing as a guest artist on the Bill Gaither Homecoming videos. After Sumner's death, lead singer Ed Enoch, a member of the Stamps since 1969, took over the group and renamed it "Ed Enoch and the Golden Covenant." Enoch later acquired the rights and renamed the group The Stamps Quartet. For the past 15 years the group has been primarily working in Germany, with http://www.stars-in-concert.de Elvis Presley tribute, Elvis Das Musical. They have since played shows all throughout Germany, Switzerland, Austria, and even dates in Sweden, The Netherlands, Norway, and China.

=== Relationship with Elvis Presley ===
Sumner met a young Elvis Presley when he was singing with the Blackwood Brothers. Presley was 19 and had shown up at a concert but did not have the money to get in; Sumner found out about it and told Presley anytime he wanted to come in to find him and he would admit him at any place they were singing. The two formed a strong relationship.

In a 1990 interview with Geraldo Rivera, Sumner contradicted many myths regarding Presley's substance abuse, namely that Presley was a heavy drinker and used illicit substances. "I knew Elvis from the time he was 14, and all I ever saw him drink was one glass of peach brandy. He (Presley) would fire you for using marijuana, he detested cocaine, and barely approved of me drinking." Sumner also stated that Elvis "had no idea that he was killing himself with his medications, he felt as long as he was doing what the Doctor was OK with, he was staying within the bounds." Presley's death hit Sumner hard and the Stamps sang at Presley's funeral and Sumner credits Presley with saving his own life by intervening with his own alcohol use. "He (Elvis) helped saved my marriage, my health, my career, and ultimately, my life."

== Range and awards ==
For 18 years, Sumner held the Guinness World Record for recording the lowest bass note. As of 2011, he has been surpassed only by the following three vocalists: Dan Britton (1984), Tim Storms (2002 and once more in 2012), and Roger Menees (2011). Sumner was inducted into the Gospel Music Hall of Fame in 1984 and the Southern Gospel Music Association Hall of Fame in 1997.

== Death ==
On November 16, 1998, three days before his 74th birthday, Sumner was found dead of a heart attack in his hotel room in Myrtle Beach, South Carolina, while on tour with the Stamps Quartet.

== Other activities ==
In 1964, Sumner founded the Gospel Music Association with James Blackwood. He was also the founding force behind the National Quartet Convention.

== Songwriting ==
Sumner wrote more than 700 songs including the following:

- A Land Where Milk And Honey Flows
- A Million Years From Now
- Aloha Time
- Because Of Him
- Behind Your Tears
- Beyond God's Horizon
- Crossing Chilly Jordan
- Each Step I Take
- Eternal Paradise
- Everybody Ought To Love
- For I've Got the Lord
- Give Me the Strength To Stand
- God Made A Way
- He Means All the World To Me
- He Will See You Through
- Heaven For Me
- He's All That I Need
- His Love
- I Believe In the Old Time Way
- I Can Feel the Touch Of His Hand
- I Do Dear Jesus I Believe
- I Don't Mind
- I Found God
- I Know It's So
- I Serve A Living God
- I Wanna Rest
- I Want To Meet You Up In Heaven
- I Wouldn't Trade
- I'll Follow Where He Leads
- I'm Happy And Free
- In That Land
- Inside the Gate
- I've Got To Walk That Lonesome Road
- Jesus Is Mine
- Keep Me
- Listen
- Mammy's Boy
- My All I Give
- Never
- Old Man Death
- On That Happy Golden Shore
- On the Other Side Of Jordan
- One Day
- Only One Touch
- Paradise Valley
- Pay As You Go
- Rolling Along
- Some Wonderful Day
- Someday Soon
- Something Old Something New
- Sweet Peace
- Thank God For Calvary
- The Old Country Church
- The Touch Of His Hand
- The Victory Road
- There Is A Light
- Walking And Talking With My Lord
- Walking In the Light
- What A Glorious Morning That Will Be
- What A Morning
- When I'm Alone
- When the Clouds Roll By
- Wonderful Love
- Wonderful Savior

== The Stamps Quartet members ==
=== Line-ups ===
1962–1963 (under the name "the Stamps Quartet")	1963–1964	1964–1965
Jerry Redd – tenor; Roger McDuff – lead; Terry Blackwood – baritone; John Hall – bass; Joe Roper – piano	Jim Hill – tenor; Roger McDuff – lead; Terry Blackwood – baritone; John Hall – bass; Joe Roper – piano	Jim Hill – tenor; Roger McDuff – lead; Mylon LeFevre – baritone; John Hall – bass; Joe Roper – piano
1965	1965–1966 (under the name "J. D. Sumner and the Stamps Quartet")	1966
Jim Hill – tenor; Roger McDuff – lead; Mylon LeFevre – baritone; John Hall – bass; Chuck Ramsey – piano	Jim Hill – tenor; Roger McDuff – lead; Jimmy Blackwood – baritone; J. D. Sumner – bass; Chuck Ramsey – piano	Jim Hill – tenor; Roger McDuff – lead; Jimmy Blackwood – baritone; J. D. Sumner – bass; Donnie Sumner – piano
1966–1968	1968–1969	1969–1970
Jim Hill – tenor; Donnie Sumner – lead; Jimmy Blackwood – baritone; J. D. Sumner – bass; Tony Brown - piano	Roy McNeal – tenor; Donnie Sumner – lead; Jimmy Blackwood – baritone; J. D. Sumner – bass; Tony Brown - piano	Roy McNeal – tenor; Donnie Sumner – lead; Ed Enoch – baritone; J. D. Sumner – bass; Tony Brown - piano
1970–1971	1971–1972	1972
Gary "Buck" Buckles – tenor; Donnie Sumner – lead; Ed Enoch – baritone; J. D. Sumner – bass; Richard Sterban – bass; Tony Brown - piano	Bill Baize – tenor; Donnie Sumner – lead; Ed Enoch – baritone; J. D. Sumner – bass; Richard Sterban – bass; Tony Brown - piano	Bill Baize – tenor; Donnie Sumner – lead; Ed Enoch – baritone; J. D. Sumner – bass; Richard Sterban – bass; Linda Robinson - piano
1972–1973	1973	1973–1974
Bill Baize – tenor; Donnie Sumner – lead; Ed Enoch – baritone; J. D. Sumner – bass; Richard Sterban – bass (1972); Nick Bruno - piano	Bill Baize – tenor; Donnie Sumner – lead; Ed Enoch – baritone; J. D. Sumner – bass; Ed Wideman – bass; Phil Johnson - piano	Bill Baize – tenor; Donnie Sumner – lead; Ed Enoch – baritone; J. D. Sumner – bass; Ronnie Mabe - piano
1974	1974–1976	1976
Bill Baize – tenor; Ed Enoch – lead; Dave Rowland – baritone; J. D. Sumner – bass; Ronnie Mabe - piano	Bill Baize – tenor; Ed Enoch – lead; Ed Hill – baritone; J. D. Sumner – bass; Larry Strickland – bass (1976); Ronnie Mabe - piano	Ron Booth – tenor; Ed Enoch – lead; Ed Hill – baritone; J. D. Sumner – bass; Larry Strickland – bass; Ronnie Mabe - piano
1976	1976–1977	1977–1978
Pat Brown – tenor; Ed Enoch – lead; Ed Hill – baritone; J. D. Sumner – bass; Larry Strickland – bass; Ronnie Mabe - piano	Gary "Buck" Buckles – tenor; Ed Enoch – lead; Ed Hill – baritone; J. D. Sumner – bass; Larry Strickland – bass; Ronnie Mabe - piano	Gary "Buck" Buckles – tenor; Ed Enoch – lead; Ed Hill – baritone; J. D. Sumner – bass; Larry Strickland – bass; Milton Smith - piano
1978–1979	1979–1980	1980
Sandra Steele – alto; Gary "Buck" Buckles – tenor; Ed Enoch – lead; Ed Hill – baritone; J. D. Sumner – bass; Larry Strickland – bass; Ronnie Mabe - piano	Jennifer O'Brien – alto; Gary "Buck" Buckles – tenor; Ed Enoch – lead; Richard Lee – baritone; J. D. Sumner – bass; Larry Strickland – bass (1979); Ronnie Mabe - piano	Jennifer O’Brien – alto; Ed Enoch – lead; David Ponder – baritone; J. D. Sumner – bass; Ronnie Mabe - piano
1980–1987	1987–1988 (back as "the Stamps Quartet")	1988–1989 (now simply as "J. D. Sumner and the Stamps")
Disbanded until 1987	Mike Eldred – tenor; Ed Enoch – lead; Guy Penrod – baritone; Larry Strickland – bass; Wayne Campbell - piano	Steve Warren – tenor; Jack Toney – lead; Ed Hill – baritone; J. D. Sumner – bass; C. J. Almgren - piano
1989–1990	1990–1991	1991–1993
Jerry Trammell – tenor; Jack Toney – lead; Ed Hill – baritone; J. D. Sumner – bass; C.J. Almgren - piano	Jerry Trammell – tenor; Ed Enoch – lead; Ed Hill – baritone; J. D. Sumner – bass; C.J. Almgren - piano	Steve Warren – tenor; Ed Enoch – lead; Ed Hill – baritone; J. D. Sumner – bass; C. J. Almgren - piano/vocals
1993–1995	1995–1998	
Rick Strickland – tenor; Ed Enoch – lead; Ed Hill – baritone; J. D. Sumner – bass; C. J. Almgren - piano	Rick Strickland – tenor; Ed Enoch – lead; Ed Hill – baritone; J. D. Sumner – bass; Jerry Kelso - piano	

== Golden Covenant members ==
=== Line-ups ===
1999–2002 (under the name "Ed Enoch and Golden Covenant")	2002	2002–2003
Rick Strickland – tenor; Ed Enoch – lead; Ed Hill – baritone; Tom Graham – bass; C. J. Almgren - piano	Royce Taylor – tenor; Ed Enoch – lead; Ed Hill – baritone; David Hester – bass; Jerry Kelso - piano	Royce Taylor – tenor; Ed Enoch – lead; Ed Hill – baritone; Butch Owens – bass; Jerry Kelso - piano

== The New Stamps Quartet members ==
=== Line-ups ===
2003–2005 (under the name "the Stamps Quartet")	2005–2006	2006
Royce Taylor – tenor; Ed Enoch – lead; Ed Hill – baritone; Butch Owens – bass; Jerry Kelso - piano	Royce Taylor – tenor; Ed Enoch – lead; Michael Helwig – baritone; Butch Owens – bass; Jerry Kelso - piano	Steve Warren – tenor; Ed Enoch – lead; Michael Helwig – baritone; Butch Owens – bass; Jerry Kelso - piano
2007–2008	2008–2011	2011–2012
Joseph Frech – tenor; Ed Enoch – lead; Michael Helwig – baritone; Seth Dillehay – *Teddy Ray Bullard -- bass	Brian Worley – tenor; Ed Enoch – lead; Terry Allen – baritone; Brandon Barry – bass	Joseph Frech – tenor; Ed Enoch – lead; Roger Robinson – baritone; Brandon Barry – bass; Jerry Kelso - piano
2012–2015	2015–2016	2016
Joseph Frech – tenor; Ed Enoch – lead; Joe Combs – baritone; Michael Means – bass; Jerry Kelso - piano	Tony Goforth – tenor; Ed Enoch – lead; Joe Combs – baritone; Michael Means – bass	Tony Goforth – tenor; Ed Enoch – lead; Joe Combs – baritone; Blake Whitlock – bass
2016–2017	2017–2022	
Steve Ladd – tenor; Ed Enoch – lead; Joe Combs – baritone; Michael Means – bass	Bobby Davenport – tenor; Ed Enoch – lead; Joe Combs – baritone; Michael Means – bass	
2022-Present
Jim Worthing - tenor; Ed Enoch - lead; Casey Shepherd - baritone; David Mann - bass

== Discography ==
=== Solo albums ===
- 1965: Bass, Bass, Bass (re-issued in 1975 as the Stamps Quartet Present Their Dynamic Bass)
- 1968: The Many Moods of the Illustrious J. D. Sumner
- 1969: The Heart of a Man (re-issued in 1982 as The Masters V Present Their Majestic Bass, J. D. Sumner)
- 1972: The Way It Sounds Down Low
- 1984: Thank God for Kids
- 1985: An American Trilogy
- 1988: The Masters V Present the Superlative Bass Voice of J. D. Sumner

==== Compilations ====
- 1999: The Wait Is Over
- 2009: A Musical Biography

=== With the Blackwood Brothers ===
- 1956: Hymn Sing
- 1957: I'm Bound for That City
- 1958: His Hands
- 1959: The Stranger of Galilee
- 1959: Paradise Island
- 1959: The Blackwood Brothers
- 1959: Give the World a Smile
- 1960: Beautiful Isle of Somewhere
- 1960: Sunday Meetin' Time
- 1961: The Pearly White City
- 1962: Precious Memories
- 1962: The Blackwood Brothers Combine With the Statesmen to Wish You a Musical Merry Christmas
- 1962: The Keys to the Kingdom
- 1962: At Home with the Blackwoods
- 1963: The Blackwood Brothers Quartet Featuring Their Famous Bass J. D. Sumner
- 1963: Give Us This Day
- 1964: Blackwood Family Album
- 1964: Gloryland Jubilee
- 1965: Something Old – Something New
- 1965: Do You Thank the Lord Each Day

=== J.D. Sumner & the Stamps ===
- 1965: The Stamps featuring Jim Hill
- 1966: The Incomparable Stamps Quartet
- 1966: The New, Very New Sound
- 1967: Colorful
- 1968: Music, Music, Music
- 1969: Signs of a Good Life
- 1969: Songs to Remember
- 1970: J.D. Sumner and the Exciting Stamps Quartet
- 1970: Get Together
- 1971: Goin' Home (re-issued in 1984 as Green Grass of Home)
- 1971: Live In Nashville
- 1971: The Touch of His Hand
- 1972: Sweet Song of Salvation
- 1972: Something Special
- 1973: Leaning on the Arms of Jesus
- 1973: Sing Gospel Classics
- 1974: I Will Never Pass This Way Again
- 1974: What a Happy Time
- 1975: Live at Murray State
- 1977: Street Corner Preacher
- 1977: Elvis' Favorite Gospel Songs (Sung at His Funeral)
- 1977: Memories of our Friend, Elvis (Live)
- 1979: Keep Me
- 1980: I Believe in the Old Time Way (re-issued in 1983 as If I Can Help Somebody)
- 1988: Sing the Award-Winning Songs Of J. D. Sumner
- 1988: Today
- 1988: Inspirational Hymns
- 1988: Smile
- 1989: Live from the Alabama State Coliseum
- 1990: Victory Road
- 1991: Peace in the Valley
- 1991: Town & Country
- 1991: Southern Gospel Classics
- 1991: Light and Lively
- 1991: "Sing" - Cerely Yours
- 1992: Quartet Classics
- 1992: Master of the Wind
- 1993: 20 Southern Gospel Favorites
- 1994: Songs You Requested
- 1994: Elvis Gospel Favorites
- 1994: Sing Elvis Classics (all secular songs)
- 1995: Let's Have Church
- 1996: Golden Stairs
- 1999: The Final Sessions

==== Compilations ====
- 1968: Best of the Stamps
- 1974: Vintage Gospel (re-issued in 1983 as Daddy Sang Bass)
- 1974: Sing Golden Gospel Hits
- 1977: 16 Greats
- 1979: For God So Loved the World (re-issued in 1982 as He Looked Beyond My Faults)
- 1983: The Joy of Knowing Jesus
- 1992: Masters of Gospel
- 1995: The Best of J. D. Sumner And the Stamps
- 1997: Pure Gospel: 16 Vintage Gospel Standards
- 1999: Gospel Music Hall of Fame
- 2005: Treasury of Memories

=== With the Masters V ===
See Masters V discography
