= Rosie Rozell =

Southern Gospel singer (b. 1928, d. 1995)

- Born: Roland Dwayne Rozell; August 29, 1928; Hardy, Kay County, Oklahoma, United States
- Died: February 28, 1995 (aged 66); Trussville, Alabama, United States
- Occupation: Southern Gospel singer
- Known for: his group, Rosie Rozell and the Searchers
- Notable work: "Oh What A Savior," "Hide Thou Me," "There's Room at the Cross”
- Spouse: Betty Rozell
- Awards: posthumously inducted into Southern Gospel Music Hall of Fame (1999)

Roland Dwayne “Rosie” Rozell (August 29, 1928 – February 28, 1995) was a tenor in the Southern Gospel Music industry. He was a tenor singer for several groups, starting with the Tulsa Trumpeters, The Statesmen Quartet, Rosie Rozell and the Searchers and The Masters V. He has been called “the gold standard” for Southern Gospel music tenors and is considered the greatest tenor singer in the genre’s history by many industry insiders and critics.

He was born on August 29, 1928, in Hardy, Kay County, Oklahoma.

His group, Rosie Rozell and the Searchers also featured his wife Betty Rozell, a singer and keyboardist. The Searchers featured a Hammond B3 organ, which was unusual for Southern Gospel Music.

He is most well known for his involvement in songs such as "Oh What A Savior," "Hide Thou Me," and "There's Room at the Cross.” He appeared on several of the Bill Gaither Homecoming Reunion concerts.

He died February 28, 1995, in Trussville, Alabama. He was 66 years old. He was inducted into Southern Gospel Music Hall of Fame in 1999.
