= Gordon Hill (singer) =

American singer (1927–2014)

Gordon E. Hill (February 10, 1927 – November 24, 2014) was an American quartet bass singer during the 1940s through the early 1960s.

== Life and career ==
Hill was born in Missouri on February 10, 1927. He sang with several quartets, including:

- C.R. Melton's All American Quartet
- Bobby Strickland's Southlanders Quartet in Birmingham, Alabama
- The original bass singer for Hovie Lister's Statesmen Quartet in Atlanta, Georgia in 1948.

After leaving the Statesmen in 1949, he sang bass with several quartets including a return to the All American Quartet in Mount Vernon, Illinois and the Revelaires Quartet, headquartered in Atlanta, Georgia.

Hill died in Tucson, Arizona on November 24, 2014, at the age of 87.
