= The Statesmen Quartet =

American Southern gospel quartet

- Also known as: Hovie Lister and The Statesmen Quartet
- Origin: Atlanta, Georgia, United States
- Genres: Southern gospel, Gospel, Contemporary christian
- Years active: 1948–1975; 1977–1981; 1992–2001
- Labels: RCA Victor, Skylite, Chime, Artistic, Temple

The Statesmen Quartet (also known as Hovie Lister and The Statesmen Quartet) were an American southern gospel quartet founded in 1948 by Baptist Minister Hovie Lister. Along with the Blackwood Brothers, the Statesmen Quartet were considered the most successful and influential gospel quartet of the 1950s and 1960s and had a wide influence on artists during that time from the gospel, country, pop, and rock and roll genre. Along with hits spanning many decades, The Statesmen Quartet had many notable successes including being the first Gospel group to receive endorsement deals. Additionally, they made television commercials, appeared on numerous radio and TV shows, and were signed to RCA Victor before launching their own record label, Skylite Records, with The Blackwood Brothers.

== Formation (1948) ==
The Statesmen Quartet was founded in 1948 in Atlanta, Georgia, by Hovie Lister, a Baptist minister and convention-style piano player. Lister constructed the quartet as a hand-picked group of the best singing voices in order to secure a prime time-slot on the new WCON radio station. The initial line-up included Bobby Strickland singing tenor, Mosie Lister singing lead, Bervin Kendrick singing baritone, and Gordon Hill singing bass. The group's name was lifted from the title of a newsletter published by Herman Talmadge, Governor of Georgia, with Talmadge's permission. The quartet made their debut on WCON in Atlanta in October, 1948.

== Broadcasting and recording (1948–1952) ==
After having several radio programs in the Atlanta, Georgia, area, The Statesmen "became the first Southern gospel quartet to have a nationally syndicated TV program, Singing Time in Dixie, sponsored by Nabisco." The group recorded 36 songs for Capitol Records from 1949 to 1953. They switched to RCA Victor in 1954, recording more than 30 albums during their years with that company. In 1968, they began recording for Skylite. Though most fans were inclined to support the group in terms of religious inspiration and/or entertainment, a 1964 profile of the group in Billboard magazine noted, "The Statesmen ... are known as a complex organization to the music industry." In addition to the broadcasting and recording activities already mentioned, the article cited ownership of four gospel music publishing companies that "print and distribute song books and sheet music."

== Pinnacle years (1953–1957) ==
In 1952, The Statesmen Quartet entered into a business partnership with The Blackwood Brothers Quartet. The "Stateswood" team would dominate Southern Gospel music for the next two decades. Lister's vision of the premiere lineup came to fruition by adding Jake Hess on lead in 1948, James "Big Chief" Wetherington as bass in 1949, Doy Ott as baritone in 1951, and finally with Denver Crumpler as tenor in 1953, with Lister on piano and master of ceremonies. On September 24, 1953, Strickland was killed in an car accident at the age of 33. During the next years, The Statesmen Quartet achieved fame as one of the premiere groups of both Southern gospel and quartet music. With this lineup, The Statesmen began recording for RCA Victor and began starring in the Nabisco Hour national TV show as mentioned above. Popular songs of this period include "Get Away Jordan" and "Happy Rhythm". As early as 1950, The Statesmen used the phrase "Rockin' and rollin'" in a song, and Hovie Lister's frantic boogie-woogie piano, piano bench acrobatics, and hair shaken down in his eyes would have great influence on early rock and roll artists, particularly on Jerry Lee Lewis, who was a fan of gospel music and the Statesmen.

On July 4, 1955, the Blackwood/Statesmen team traveled to Texas for an engagement that would feature several secular artists on the same program. Among them was Elvis Presley. Elvis was planning to sing his rock hits, but refrained out of respect of his gospel idols. The Statesmen exerted a powerful influence on young Elvis, who idolized and imitated Jake Hess' vocal styling and Wetherington's movements and gyrations on stage. In an interview with songwriter Bill Gaither, Hess remembered seeing young Elvis coming to Statesmen shows in Tupelo when Presley was only nine or ten. Hess said that the serious young Elvis would ask him, "How do you make a record?" or "How many suits you got?" On the Gaither Homecoming video "Oh My Glory", Hess recalls Presley attending Statesmen concerts and being invited up onstage to sing lead in his place on a couple of handpicked numbers. Phillip Goff, in The Blackwell Companion to Religion in America, provided a description of how The Statesmen began one live appearance. "Greeted by thunderous applause, the announcer approaches the microphone: "You're listening to the original Wally Fowler All Night Singing, November the sixth, right here in Nashville, Tennessee, nineteen hundred fifty-nine. This is the eleventh anniversary and the greatest crowd that's ever assembled for any program in the Ryman Auditorium is here tonight for the all night sing." Goff's description related but one aspect of The Statesmen's showmanship. Francis Edward Abernathy wrote about lasting changes that the group introduced to the world of gospel quartets: The Statesmen Quartet added flourishes which entertained new audiences—exuberant singing, arm waving, hand clapping, and electrifying performances. This was alien behavior for traditional convention quartets. But the new behavior attracted interest. The Statesmen became so popular that subsequent gospel quartets imitated their style.

== Rosie Rozell era (1958–1973) ==
In 1957, Crumpler died after seeking medical attention for what was at the time diagnosed as a heart condition, but was revealed to be diabetic shock. Former tenor Cat Freeman came back briefly, but was replaced in 1958 by former Oklahoma police officer Roland "Rosie" Rozell. The Rozell-Hess-Ott-Wetherington lineup recorded such classics as "Faith Unlocks The Door" and Rozell's signature songs "Oh What A Savior" and "There's Room at the Cross," both songs becoming gospel music mainstays for decades after. In 1963, Hess left The Statesmen to form his own quartet, Jake Hess and The Imperials. Lister recruited Jack Toney to replace Hess. Before long, Toney's powerful voice helped The Statesmen to press on and continue with their success. Another setback occurred when Wetherington died suddenly on October 3, 1973 of an embolism due to a blood clot while attending the National Quartet Convention in Nashville. The embolism was a result of an accident on a hunting trip he was on months earlier. It was around this time that the group was losing stability on its own and more changes to the line-up were inevitable.

== Later years (1974–2001) ==
Later incarnations of The Statesmen would include tenors Sherrill "Shaun" Nielson, Willie Wynn, and Johnny Cook; lead singers Roy McNeil and Jim Hill; baritones Chris Hess, Biney English and Rick Fair; and bass singers Ray Burdett, Tommy Thompson, Bob Caldwell and Doug Young. Over the years, Jake Hess, Jack Toney, Doy Ott and Rosie Rozell would rejoin The Statesmen at various times, most notably a couple years after Wetherington's death when Lister brought back Rozell, Hess, and Ott as "The Statesmen" sans bass. A comical pairing of this classic Statesmen "trio" with longtime Blackwood Brothers/Stamps Quartet bass singer J.D. Sumner at the 1977 National Quartet Convention in Nashville was the birth of the Masters V, which would include Rosie Rozell, Jake Hess, and Hovie Lister in its lineup. The Statesmen would continue to travel with rotating lineups through 1981, and began to tour again from 1992 until Lister's health failed in 2001.

Doy Ott was the first of the original group that had survived Crumpler and Wetherington to die, having suffered a cerebral hemorrhage in 1982 that left him comatose, although he did not die until four years later. Rozell died on February 28, 1995, at the age of 66; Lister died on December 27, 2001, at the age of 75 due to complications of lymphoma, and Hess succumbed to a long battle with heart disease on January 4, 2004, at the age of 76.

== Legacy and cultural impact ==
The Statesmen influenced both gospel and non-gospel artists alike. Elvis Presley was a fan of the group growing up and wanted to emulate them in his career and got the chance to perform with them. Jerry Lee Lewis also had a strong admiration for the group, but most notably Lister and his piano playing. "The Killer", as Lewis was called, credited Lister and the Statesman for developing his own style in performance. Carl Perkins and Larry Gatlin also cited themselves as fans of the group, while Tammy Wynette said on numerous occasions that Tenor Denver Crumpler was her "favorite singer, ever." The group's appeal to early rock and roll fans also pre-dated the "rock around the clock" era and also had an influence on early Contemporary Christian Music.

In his book They Heard Georgia Singing, former Georgia Governor and Senator Zell Miller said that Lister and his group "more than anyone else, put style and flair into gospel music. ... Hovie was first of all a minister, and he ministered with his music," said Sen. Miller. "But he used to say religion did not need to have a long face, and he made religion upbeat." Lister defended his musical style that was considered "worldly" by many churches by retorting "If it takes shaking my hair down, beating a piano like Liberace or Piano Red to keep these young people out of beer joints or the rear seats of automobiles, I'll do it. The devil's got his kind of entertainment. We've got ours."

The group was elected into the Gospel Music Hall of Fame in 1998 and the Southern Gospel Music Hall of Fame the previous year in 1997. The group permanently folded and retired in 2002.

== Members ==
=== Lineups ===
1948	1948–1949	1949
Bobby Strickland – tenor; Mosie Lister – lead; Bervin Kendrick – baritone; Gordon Hill – bass; Hovie Lister – piano, MC, group owner	Bobby Strickland – tenor; Jake Hess – lead; Bervin Kendrick – baritone; Gordon Hill – bass; Hovie Lister – piano, MC, group owner	Bobby Strickland – tenor; Jake Hess – lead; Bervin Kendrick – baritone; A.D. Soward – bass; Hovie Lister – piano, MC, group owner
1949–1951	1951	1951–1953
Bobby Strickland – tenor; Jake Hess – lead; Bervin Kendrick – baritone; "Big Chief" Wetherington – bass; Hovie Lister – piano, MC, group owner	Earl Terry – tenor; Jake Hess – lead; Troy Posey – baritone; "Big Chief" Wetherington – bass; Hovie Lister – piano, MC, group owner; Boyce Hawkins – piano substitute for Lister	Claris "Cat" Freeman – tenor; Jake Hess – lead; Doy Ott – baritone, occasional piano; "Big Chief" Wetherington – bass; Hovie Lister – piano, MC, group owner
1953–1956	1956–1957	1957-1958
Denver Crumpler – tenor; Jake Hess – lead; Doy Ott – baritone; "Big Chief" Wetherington – bass; Hovie Lister – piano, MC, group owner	Denver Crumpler – tenor; Les Roberson – lead; Doy Ott – baritone; "Big Chief" Wetherington – bass; Hovie Lister – piano, MC, group owner	Claris "Cat" Freeman – tenor; Jake Hess – lead; Doy Ott – baritone; "Big Chief" Wetherington – bass; Hovie Lister – piano, MC, group owner
1958–1963	1963–1966	1966–1967
Rosie Rozell – tenor; Jake Hess – lead; Gary McSpadden would fill in for Hess sometime in 1960; Doy Ott – baritone; "Big Chief" Wetherington – bass; Hovie Lister – piano, MC, group owner	Rosie Rozell – tenor; Jack Toney – lead; Doy Ott – baritone; "Big Chief" Wetherington – bass; Hovie Lister – piano, MC, group owner	Rosie Rozell – tenor; Roy McNeal – lead; Doy Ott – baritone; "Big Chief" Wetherington – bass; Hovie Lister – piano, MC, group owner
1967–1968	1968–1969	1969–1972
Rosie Rozell – tenor; Jack Toney – lead; Doy Ott – baritone; "Big Chief" Wetherington – bass; Hovie Lister – piano, MC, group owner	Rosie Rozell – tenor; Jim Hill – lead; Doy Ott – baritone; "Big Chief" Wetherington – bass; Hovie Lister – piano, MC, group owner	Shaun Neilsen – tenor; Jim Hill – lead; Doy Ott – baritone; "Big Chief" Wetherington – bass; Hovie Lister – piano, MC, group owner; Tim Baty - guitar
1972–1973	1973	1973–1974
Shaun Neilsen – tenor; Gary Timbs – lead; Doy Ott – baritone; "Big Chief" Wetherington – bass; Hovie Lister – piano, MC, group owner; Tim Baty - guitar	Rosie Rozell – tenor; Gary Timbs – lead; Doy Ott – baritone; "Big Chief" Wetherington – bass; Hovie Lister – piano, MC, group owner; Tim Baty - guitar	Willie Wynn – tenor; Gary Timbs – lead; Doy Ott – baritone; Ray Burdett – bass; Hovie Lister – piano, MC, group owner; Kenny Hicks - guitar
1974	1974-1975	1976
Willie Wynn – tenor; Elmer Cole – lead; Doy Ott – baritone; Ray Burdett – bass; Hovie Lister – piano, MC, group owner; Kenny Hicks - guitar	Wayne Hilton – tenor; David Will – lead; Doy Ott – baritone; Ray Burdett – bass; Hovie Lister – piano, MC, group owner; Kenny Hicks - guitar	Rosie Rozell – tenor; Jake Hess – lead; Doy Ott – baritone; Hovie Lister – piano, MC, group owner
1977	1978–1979	1979
Rosie Rozell – tenor; Jake Hess – lead; Doy Ott – baritone; Rex Nelon - bass (1977; part time); Hovie Lister – piano, MC, group owner	Rosie Rozell – tenor; Jake Hess – lead; Chris Hess – baritone; Hovie Lister – piano, MC, group owner	Rosie Rozell – tenor; Jack Toney – lead; Ed Hill – baritone; Tommy Thompson - bass; Hovie Lister – piano, MC, group owner; Vep Ellis II - guitar
1979–1980	1981	1981–1992
Rosie Rozell – tenor; Buddy Burton – lead; Ed Hill – baritone; Tommy Thompson - bass; Hovie Lister – piano, MC, group owner; Jake Robinson - guitar (1979)	Rosie Rozell – tenor; Jake Hess – lead; Richard Coltrane – baritone; J. D. Sumner - bass; Hovie Lister – piano, MC, group owner	Retired again until 1992
1992–1993	1993	1993
Johnny Cook – tenor; Jake Hess – lead; Biney English – baritone; Bob Caldwell – bass; Hovie Lister – piano, MC, group owner	Tank Tackett – tenor; Wayne Little – lead; Scooter Simmons – baritone; Stacy Bragg – bass; Hovie Lister – piano, MC, group owner	Tank Tackett – tenor; Wayne Little – lead; Scooter Simmons – baritone; Nic Val – bass; Hovie Lister – piano, MC, group owner
1993	1993-1994	1994
Tank Tackett – tenor; Wayne Little – lead; Scooter Simmons – baritone; Roy Pauley – bass; Hovie Lister – piano, MC, group owner	Tank Tackett – tenor; Buddy Burton – lead; Jerry Candler – baritone; Roy Pauley – bass; Hovie Lister – piano, MC, group owner	Steve Warren – tenor; Jack Toney – lead; Mike Loprinzi – baritone; Harold Gilley – bass; Hovie Lister – piano, MC, group owner
1994	1994-1998	1998–2001
Gene Miller – tenor; Jack Toney – lead; Mike Loprinzi – baritone; Doug Young – bass; Hovie Lister – piano, MC, group owner	Wallace Nelms – tenor; Jack Toney – lead; Mike Loprinzi – baritone; Doug Young – bass; Hovie Lister – piano, MC, group owner	Wallace Nelms – tenor; Jack Toney – lead; Rick Fair – baritone; Doug Young – bass; Hovie Lister – piano, MC, group owner

=== Grand Ole Gospel Reunion Statesmen Members ===
1988-1991

(Under the Name "Hovie Lister and the Statesmen Quartet")

- Rosie Rozell – tenor
- Jake Hess – lead
- Buddy Burton – baritone
- Tommy Thompson – bass
- Hovie Lister – piano, MC, group owner

=== Grand Ole Gospel Reunion Quartet ===
2001

(Under the Name "Grand Ole Gospel Reunion Quartet")

- John Rulapaugh – tenor
- Jack Toney – lead
- Buddy Burton – baritone
- Roy Pauley – bass
- Hovie Lister – piano, MC, group owner

=== In Memorian ===
- Johnny Cook (1992–1993) (died May 14, 2000; aged 51)
- Denver Crumpler (1953–1957) (died March 21, 1957; aged 44)
- Claris Freeman (1951–1953, 1957–1958) (died March 21, 1989; aged 67)
- Jake Hess (1948–1963, 1975, 1977–1979, 1988, 1992–1993) (died January 4, 2004; aged 76)
- Ed Hill (1979–1980) (died July 13, 2020)
- Gordon Hill (1948) (died November 24, 2014; aged 87)
- Hovie Lister (died December 28, 2001; aged 75)
- Mosie Lister (1948) (died February 12, 2015; aged 93)
- Gary McSpadden (1960) (filled in for Jake Hess) (died April 15, 2020; aged 77)
- Rex Nelon (1977;part time) (died January 24, 2000; aged 68)
- Doy Ott (1951–1978) (died November 6, 1986; aged 67)
- Roy Pauley (1993–1994) (died August 12, 2023; aged 74)
- Rosie Rozell (1958–1969, 1973, 1977–1981) (died February 28, 1995; aged 66)
- J. D. Sumner (1981) (died November 16, 1998; aged 73)
- Bobby Strickland (1948–1951) (died September 24, 1953; aged 33)
- Jack Toney (1963–1966, 1967–1968, 1979, 1994–2001) (died April 15, 2004; aged 70)
- James Wetherington (1949–1973) (died October 3, 1973; aged 50)

== Discography ==
- 1957: The Statesmen Quartet with Hovie Lister
- 1958: The Statesmen Quartet Sings with Hovie Lister
- 1958: The Bible Told Me So (RCA)
- 1959: Hymns
- 1959: I'll Meet You By the River (RCA)
- 1959: Get Away Jordan
- 1960: Mansion Over the Hilltop (RCA)
- 1960: On Stage (RCA)
- 1960: Something To Shout About
- 1960: Encores
- 1960: Peace, O Lord
- 1960: Statesmen Blackwood Favorites
- 1961: Out West (RCA)
- 1961: Through the States (RCA)
- 1962: Stop, Look & Listen for the Lord
- 1962: Camp-Meeting Hymns (RCA)
- 1962: Singing Time in Dixie (Skylight)
- 1963: The Mystery of His Way (RCA)
- 1963: Message in the Sky (RCA Camden)
- 1963: A Gospel Concert
- 1964: Hovie Lister Sings with His Famous Statesmen Qt. (RCA)
- 1964: Hovie Lister Spotlights Doy Ott (RCA)
- 1964: Songs Of Faith (RCA Camden)
- 1965: The Best Of The Statesmen Quartet (RCA)
- 1964: Doris Akers & The Statesmen Sing for You
- 1965: The Sensational Statesmen Quartet (RCA)
- 1965: Sings the Golden Gospel Songs (RCA)
- 1965: All Day Sing & Dinner on the Ground
- 1966: The Happy Sound (RCA)
- 1966: Sings the Gospel Gems
- 1967: In Gospel Country (RCA)
- 1967: My God is Real (RCA Camden)
- 1967: Showers of Blessing (RCA)
- 1968: Sing Brother Sing (RCA)
- 1968: Hits of the Decade
- 1968: Happy Land
- 1968: The Best of the Statesmen Volume 2 (RCA)
- 1968: God Loves American People (Skylite)
- 1968: Standing on the Promises
- 1969: Taller Than Trees (RCA Camden)
- 1969: Thanks to Calvary (Skylite)
- 1969: New Sounds Today (Skylite)
- 1970: No Greater Love (RCA Camden)
- 1970: Featuring… (Skylite)
- 1970: The Common Man(Skylite)
- 1971: Put Your Hand in the Hand (Skylite)
- 1972: Keep On Smiling (Skylite)
- 1972: Hits of the Decade
- 1972: Hits of the Decade Vol. 2 (Chime, Artistic)
- 1972: They That Sow (Skylite)
- 1973: I Believe in Jesus
- 1973: In Memory Of "Big Chief" Jim Wetherington & Denver "Crump" Crumpler (Lord, I Want to Go to Heaven) (CAM)
- 1973: Time to Remember
- 1974: Ain't That What It's All About
- 1974: Precious Memories
- 1974: Feature Doy Ott
- 1977: The Legendary Statesmen Return
- 1977: Gospel Songs Elvis Loved
- 1977: Get Away Jordan
- 1978: His Love Put a Song in My Heart
- 1978: Oh What a Savior (Skylite)
- 1979: Gospel Gems (Skylite)
- 1979: Hovie Lister & The Sensational Statesmen
- 1980: He is Here (Skylite)
- 1981: Sweet Beulah Land
- 1992: I Surrender All
- 1992: The Bible Told Me So
- 1992: Get Away Jordan
- 1992: Jubilee’s A Coming
- 1992: Revival
- 1992: O What a Savior
- 1993: O My Lord What a Time
- 1996: Saints Don't You Know
- 1997: Hovie Lister & The Statesmen
- 1998: Still Sensational
- 1999: You Can't Shake the Rock
- 2000: Even So Come
- Unknown Year Precious Old Book (Temple)
- Unknown Year Faith Unlocks the Door (Temple)
- Unknown Year How Great Thou Art (Skylite)
