= Bibletone Records =

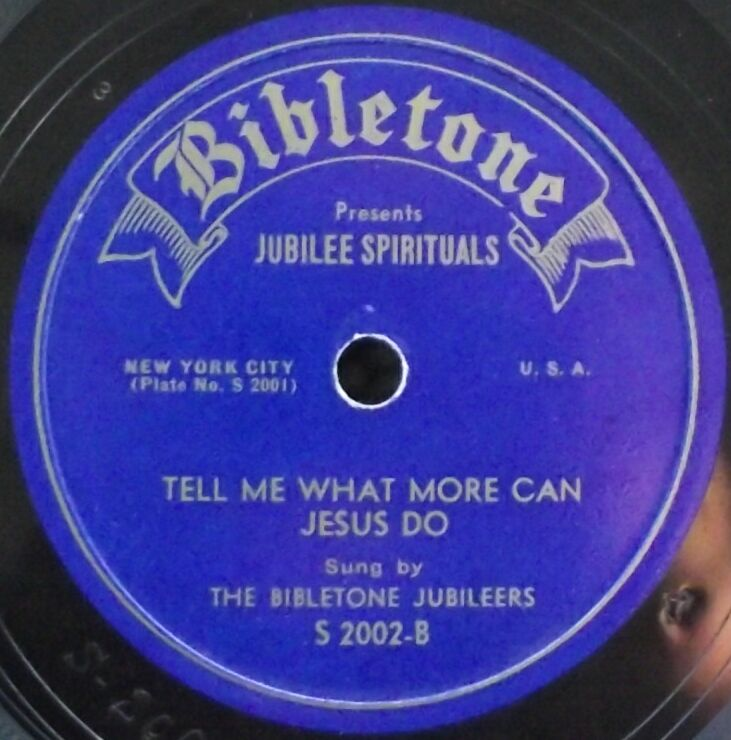
78rpm Bibletone label by The Bibletone Jubileers, catalog S-2000 side B

Bibletone Records was organized in 1942 in New York City by Arthur L. Becker. In 1944 the company home office was listed as 354 Fourth Avenue, NY. Home office executives were Arthur L. Becker, home office president; C. B. Slade, executive manager; and George Shackley, musical director.

The company was the first all-gospel label to release 33 1/3 rpm albums of their releases. It was also one of the first labels to release 10-inch as well as 12-inch long-play albums and one of the first companies to release their singles on 45, as well as 78 rpm.

== Early years ==
Initially, the early albums were of choirs, sacred music and children's music. The company also produced recorded "selected passages of the scriptures [including] Twenty-Third Psalm -- Ten Commandments -- Sermon on the Mount and others" that were sold at $1.05 each in 1943.

The success of the earliest records of The LeFevres on 78 rpm (in the 1940s), caused the company to shift its focus to Southern Gospel. The company changed ownership several times during the 1950s, operating for a time in Montrose, Pennsylvania and also in Wheaton, Illinois.

=== Seasonal recordings ===
The company also produced Christmas albums. One, Merry Christmas Music in 1948, featured the Saintsbury Singers performing a cappella carols with "six sides on 10-inch records."

Bibletone's product line in 1948 included three Easter albums -- Elijah, The Messiah, and New Hymns of Gladness. In conjunction with those albums, the company advertised its "'NEW NOISELESS SURFACE' -- a Bibletone recording achievement."

=== Singles begin ===
Bibletone ventured into production of single recordings in 1949. Initially the focus was on "signing of several Southern and Western radio artists."

== Blue & Red Vinyl Days ==
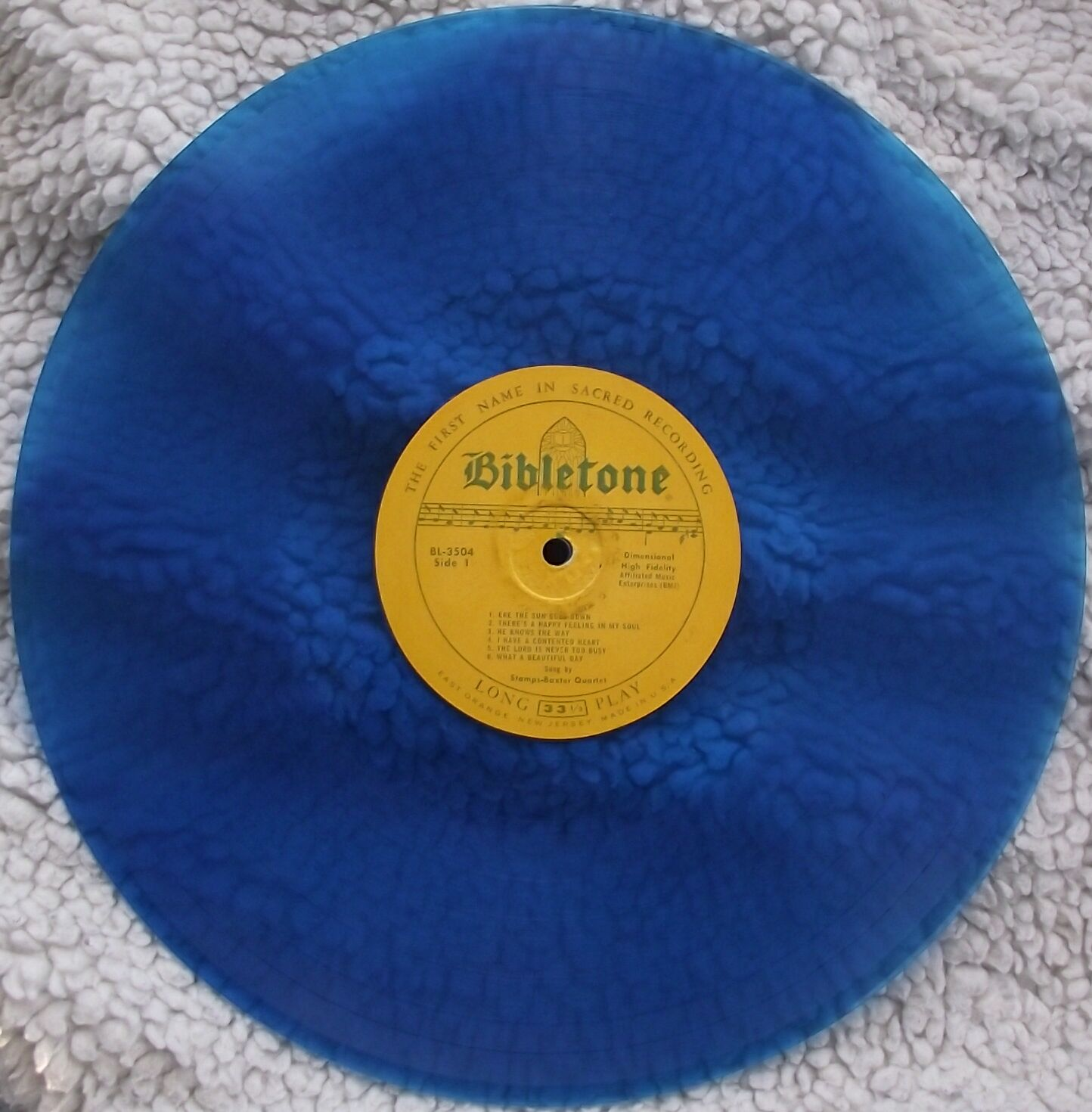
blue-vinyl Bibletone pressing, Stamps-Baxter Quartet

The company finally settled in East Orange, New Jersey, under the management of Dick Engel. During Engel's tenure, the label boasted its own pressing plant, and recorded a number of major Southern gospel groups, including : The LeFevres, The Blue Ridge Quartet, The Rebels Quartet, The Harmoneers, The Homeland Harmony Quartet, The Happy Goodman Family and the Sunshine Boys. Initial releases were often pressed by RCA Custom Pressing but Bibletone became known in the 1950s for their colorful red or blue vinyl records, pressed in the company's own pressing plant.

== Legal problems ==
In May 1961, Engel was one of four men arrested in connection with an investigation into counterfeiting of records. Nassau County, New York, police arrested the men at the Hotel Plaza in New York City. The four were charged with "grand larceny, conspiracy to violate trade-mark laws and conspiracy to commit grand larceny." Records the group was accused of counterfeiting included Frank Sinatra's Nice 'n' Easy and Enoch Light's Persuasive Percussion.

== Bibletone today ==
A reported accident at the plant caused the original Bibletone label to cease production in the late 1950s, and the trademark on the name lapsed. In 1967, Johnny Carter filed for the Bibletone trademark, and began using the name. Later, the label became a part of the National Recording Corporation in Rome, Georgia.

== See also ==
- List of record labels
- Bibletone records on the Internet Archive
