= Jake Hess =

American southern gospel singer (1927–2004)

- Jake Hess (second from right) with the Imperials in the 1966 film Sing A Song For Heaven's Sake.

Background information
- Born: Manchild Hess; December 24, 1927; Limestone County, Alabama, U.S.
- Died: January 4, 2004 (aged 76) Opelika, Alabama
- Genre: Southern gospel
- Years active: 1945–2003

Jake Hess (December 24, 1927 – January 4, 2004) was an American Grammy Award-winning southern gospel singer.

== Life ==
The son of "a sharecropper who was a shape-note singing-school teacher," Hess was born in Mt. Pisgah, near Athens, in Limestone County, Alabama. His parents were Stovall and Lydia Hess. He was the youngest of 12 children.

Hess's entry on the Encyclopedia of Alabama's website says of his name: "His parents did not officially name him, so the attending physician entered his name as 'Man Child' Hess in official documents."

When he registered with the draft board in Lincoln, Nebraska, he gave his name as "William Jesse Hess." In 1997, when Hess was preparing to get a passport to travel overseas, he discovered that his birth certificate actually read Manchild Hess. His son, Jake Jr., named his recording company Manchild Records in honor of his father.

== Career ==
Hess' career started at the age of 16, when he joined the popular John Daniel Quartet in 1943, making his recorded debut on "Just a Prayer Away". (He had previously sung with Louie Auten and the Tennessee Valley Boys.) After that, he sang with three of his brothers as the Hess Brothers Quartet. He also sang with the Sunny South Quartet and their rival, the Melody Masters Quartet. In the latter part of his life, Hess sang with The Old Friends Quartet which was featured on the Bill Gaither Homecoming videos.

=== Statesmen Quartet ===
Hess sang lead with the Statesmen Quartet from 1948 until 1963. Their recordings included projects long-term with RCA Victor. In 1977-1978 Hess reunited with the surviving members of The Statesmen Quartet, Hovie Lister, Doy Ott, and Rosie Rozell to record three projects, including "Songs Elvis Loved". The reunited Statesmen sang at Presley's funeral. In the fall of 1980, Hess, Lister, and Rozell assembled a new group with James Blackwood and J.D. Sumner. As a result, the southern gospel group the Masters V was born. They toured from 1981 until 1988 when illnesses prompted several of the members to retire from full-time singing.

=== The Imperials ===
Upon leaving the Statesmen Quartet at the end of 1963, Hess formed his "dream" group, the Imperials. Although they were not immediately accepted by his peers because of their innovative use of electric guitars and drums, they went on to become pioneers in Contemporary Christian Music, and would eventually be inducted into the Gospel Music Hall of Fame. They backed Elvis Presley from 1966 to 1971. Presleys has been quoted as noting Hess as his favorite singer. Hess left the Imperials in 1967 due to health problems.

=== The Jake Hess Sound ===
Hess also sang with his children, Becky and Chris, in a group he named "The Jake Hess Sound". In the late 1970s, Hess and his son Chris were featured singers on the television broadcasts of evangelist Dr. Gene Scott.

=== With Elvis Presley ===
Jake Hess was an idol of Presley, and had a major influence on Presley's career. As a teenager, Presley would attend gospel sings and Hess's style so impressed Presley, that Presley would emulate it for the remainder of his life. Hess sang backup on several albums recorded by Presley, and also sang at Presley's funeral in 1977.

=== Solo career ===
Hess was a noted soloist in his own right. He had won several Grammy Awards on RCA Victor as a solo artist. His last 12 years, he appeared on the Gaither Homecoming concerts and videos. These videos featured Hess from noted concerts in the U.S. at the Kennedy Center, the Ryman Auditorium, and Hawaiian islands and Europe.

=== Television ===
Hess had The Jake Hess Show on WLAC in Nashville, Tennessee and performed in the Old Time Singing Convention.

== Family ==
Hess and Joyce McWaters were married on October 5, 1952. They had three children.

Jake Hess, Jr. has become a well-known southern gospel songwriter, in addition to being married to Judy Martin of The Martins. In 1989 Jake's nephew Steve Hess & Eugene Baker (Hess & Baker, Skylite/Sing) were in Nashville to record several segments on Bobby Jones Gospel (BET Network). Jake accompanied them to the studio and liked what he heard. While they were visiting with Jake in Brentwood, he asked whether they would be interested in forming with him a new version of Jake Hess & Friends. The group would ultimately consist of Jake, Steve, Eugene & Chris, Jake's son. They started rehearsals in Jake's family room and started touring later in the year. There were several dates in Missouri and Florida, but Jake determined that the traveling was going to be more demanding than he anticipated, so by 1990 the tours were put on hold with the possibility of doing something with television.

== Book ==
In 1995, Hess's autobiography, Nothin' but Fine: The Music and the Gospel According to Jake Hess, was published by Buckland Press.

== Death ==
Hess died January 4, 2004, in Opelika, Alabama after suffering a heart attack December 14, 2003, just days after a performance in Atlanta, Georgia.

He was survived by a daughter, two sons, 10 grandchildren, one great-grandchild and a sister. Hess' wife Joyce died on September 23, 2000 aged 69.

== Awards and honors ==
- 1968: Grammy Award for Best Sacred Performance for "Beautiful Isle Of Somewhere"
- 1969: Grammy for Best Sacred Performance (Non-Classical) for "Ain't That Beautiful Singing"
- 1970: Grammy for Best Sacred Performance (Musical) for "Everything Is Beautiful"
- 1981: Grammy for Best Gospel Performance, Traditional for "The Masters V"
- 1987: Inducted into the Gospel Music Association's Gospel Music Hall of Fame
- 1995: Inducted into the Alabama Music Hall of Fame, with a John Herbert Orr Pioneer Award
- 1997: Inducted into the Southern Gospel Music Association's Hall of Fame.
- 1998: Inducted into the Gospel Music Association's Gospel Music Hall of Fame as a member of The Imperials

== Discography ==
=== Solo albums ===
- 1962: The Great Voice of Jake Hess (BibleTone Records)
- 1968: The Incomparable Jake Hess (RCA Victor)
- 1968: Beautiful Isle of Somewhere (RCA Camden)
- 1969: Ain't That Beautiful Singing (RCA)
- 1969: Spiritual Reflections (RCA)
- 1969: Up With People (RCA)
- 1970: Everything Is Beautiful
- 1981: I'm Gonna Keep On Singing (Skylite)
- 1996: Terry & Jake (Terry Bradshaw) (Chordant [Gaither Series])
- 2001: All of Me (Cathedral)
- 2005: Gotta Get a God Said (Crossroads Records) (released posthumously)

=== With The Statesmen ===
- 1957: The Statesmen Quartet with Hovie Lister
- 1958: The Statesmen Quartet Sings with Hovie Lister
- 1958: The Bible Told Me So
- 1959: Hymns
- 1959: I'll Meet You By the River
- 1959: Get Away Jordan
- 1960: Mansion Over the Hilltop
- 1960: On Stage
- 1960: Something To Shout About
- 1960: Encores
- 1960: Peace, O Lord
- 1960: Statesmen Blackwood Favorites
- 1961: Out West
- 1961: Through the States
- 1962: Stop, Look & Listen for the Lord
- 1962: Camp-Meeting Hymns
- 1962: Singing Time in Dixie
- 1963: The Mystery of His Way
- 1963: Message in the Sky
- 1963: A Gospel Concert
- 1977: The Legendary Statesmen Return
- 1977: Sing Gospel Songs Elvis Loved
- 1978: His Love Put A Song In My Heart
- 1978: Merry Christmas
- 1978: Glory, Glory, Clear The Road
- 1992: I Surrender All
- 1992: The Bible Told Me So
- 1992: Get Away Jordan
- 1992: Jubilee's A Coming
- 1992: Revival
- 1992: O What a Savior
- 1993: O My Lord What a Time
- 1997: Hovie Lister & The Statesmen

=== Albums with Elvis Presley ===
- 1966 How Great Thou Art

=== With the Masters V ===
- 1981: The Masters V (Skylite Records)
- 1982: O What a Savior (Skylite)
- 1982: The Legendary Masters V
- 1983: Featuring…
- 1983: Live at the Joyful Noise
- 1984: Thru the Years
- 1984: Good Things
- 1985: The Master's Hymns

=== Album with The Talleys ===
- 2007 Stages (Crossroads Records) (posthumous duet)

=== Video ===
- 1994: Hovie Lister And The Sensational Statesmen: An American Classic
- 1998: Jus' Jake And A Few Close Friends
- 2002: Old Friends Quartet: Encore
- 2004: A Tribute To Jake Hess

==== Gaither Homecoming Performances ====
- 1991: Homecoming
- 1995: All Day Singin' with Dinner on the Ground "Waiting For His Return"
- 1995: Revival "Prayer Is The Key To Heaven (But Faith Unlocks The Door)"
- 1995: Ryman Gospel Reunion "Goodbye, World, Goodbye," "You And Me, Jesus," "Sunday Meetin' Time"
- 1998: Atlanta Homecoming "Where Could I Go?"
- 1998: Down By The Tabernacle "Old Camp Meeting Days," "Come Sunday"
- 1998: Hawaiian Homecoming "I Don't Think, I Know," "Jesus, I Believe What You Said," "Over The Moon"
- 1998: Marching To Zion "When He Calls, I'll Fly Away"
- 1998: Rivers Of Joy "I Came To Praise The Lord"
- 1998: Singin' With The Saints "He Keeps Me Singing," "I Know Where I Am Now"
- 1999: Kennedy Center Homecoming "Old Friends." "It Is No Secret"
- 1999: Singin' In My Soul "Wore Out"
- 1999: Sweet, Sweet Spirit "I'm Telling The World About His Love"
- 2000: Harmony in the Heartland "Thanks For Sunshine," "Move That Mountain," "Get Away, Jordan"
- 2000: Irish Homecoming "No Fishin'"
- 2000: Memphis Homecoming "Give The World A Smile," "Up Above My Head"
- 2000: Whispering Hope "Doesn't Get Any Better Than This"
- 2001: Christmas... A Time for Joy "White Christmas"
- 2001: Journey To The Sky "He Knows Just What I Need"
- 2001: London Homecoming "Too Much To Gain To Lose," "O, How I Love Jesus/To Me, It's So Wonderful"
- 2001: What A Time "Oh, What A Time"
- 2002: Freedom Band "I Shall Not Be Moved"
- 2002: I'll Fly Away "So Many Reasons"
- 2002: New Orleans Homecoming "When The Saints Go Marching In"
- 2003: A Gospel Bluegrass Homecoming, Volume 1 "Sunday Meetin' Time"
- 2003: Heaven "Beautiful Isle Of Somewhere"
- 2003: Red Rocks Homecoming "I've Never Loved Him Better Than Today"
- 2003: Rocky Mountain Homecoming "I Just Love Old People"
- 2004: A Tribute: Howard & Vestal Goodman "I'm Winging My Way Back Home"
- 2004: Build a Bridge "Get Away, Jordan"
- 2004: Dottie Rambo with The Homecoming Friends "Too Much To Gain To Lose"
- 2004: We Will Stand "Sweeter As The Days Go By"
- 2005: Hymns "Without Him"
- 2012: Homecoming Celebration! "Faith Unlocks The Door Medley"
