= The LeFevres =

Southern gospel group (1921–1977)

- Also known as: The Singing LeFevres
- Origin: Smithville, Tennessee, U.S.
- Genre: Southern gospel
- Years active: 1921–1977
- Labels: Sing, Canaan, Bibletone

The LeFevres, or The Singing LeFevres, were an American Southern gospel singing group, active for nearly 50 years in the middle of the twentieth century.

The LeFevres were a family from Smithville, Tennessee; their singing group centered on brothers Urias (1910–1979) and Alphus (1912–1988). As children, they sang with their sister Maude until she married, then their sister Omega (Peggy) until she married. Their career as an ensemble began in 1921. Both sang in quartets at the Bible Training School in Cleveland, Tennessee. Urias and Eva Mae Whittington (1917–2009) married in 1934; Eva became the pianist and alto in their newly formed trio.

They moved to Charleston, South Carolina in 1937 and Atlanta in 1939. They were there the rest of their professional career, aside from a short stint in Philadelphia in the mid 1950s. They had slots performing on WGST radio as The LeFevre Trio, as they added other family members and accompanists, they decided to refer to themselves simply as The LeFevres.

Though they had previously recorded transcription discs, their first commercial recordings were made in the 1940s and released on Bibletone Records. Later releases were issued on Word Records and their own label, Sing Music Company. As the new medium of television became more popular, the group started appearing on local stations like WAGA and traveled to other regional stations to appear on their programs as well. In the 1960s, the group's Gospel Singing Caravan, a syndicated program was aired nationwide. In addition, the group heavily toured the U.S. and Canada, performing as many as 250 shows a year. The LeFevres became instrumental in the gospel music industry in Atlanta; they owned and operated their own recording studio, LeFevre Sound and also published sheet music for the gospel market. Additionally, they produced syndicated television shows for gospel and country music singers and owned a booking agency with regional operations.

The LeFevres retired in 1977 and sold off their interests to group member Rex Nelon who formed the Rex Nelon Singers in 1977. Eva Mae and Urias LeFevre were inducted into the Southern Gospel Music Hall of Fame in 1997; Alphus was inducted in 2002. Urias' youngest son, Mylon later had a highly successful solo career. Popular LeFevre alumni including Big Jim Waits, Rex Nelon, and Jimmy Jones were inducted into the Southern Gospel Music Hall of Fame in 1997, 1999, and 2007 respectively.

Eva Mae LeFevre died on May 18, 2009, in Atlanta, at the age of 91. Mylon LeFevre died on September 8, 2023 at the age of 78.

== Discography ==
- 1957: Songs of Happiness (Sing Records)
- 1959: Sing and Be Happy (Sing Records)
- 1959: Featuring Pierce LeFevre (Sing Records)
- 1960: Travel with the Lefevres (Sing Records)
- 1960: The LeFevres in Stereo (Sing Records)
- 1961: Rainbow of Love (Sing Records)
- 1962: He's Wonderful (Sing Records)
- 1963: The Lefevres Sing (Sing Records)
- 1964: Without Him (Sing Records)
- 1964: Lord It's Me Again (Sing Records)
- 1965: Sing the Gospel (Sing Records)
- 1966: You Need the Lord (Sing Records)
- 1967: A Visit with the LeFevres (Sing Records)
- 1968: A Man Who Is Wise (Sing Records)
- 1969: The Best is Yet to Come (Canaan Records)
- 1969: Play Gospel Music (Canaan Records)
- 1969: Color Him Father and 'Amen, Brother' (released on the Metromedia imprint)
- 1970: Moving Up (Canaan Records)
- 1970: The LeFevres, Vol. 1 & 2 (Bibletone)
- 1970: Pierce & Mylon (Canaan)
- 1971: Fifty Golden Years (Canaan)
- 1972: The New Sounds of The LeFevres (Canaan Records)
- 1972: Now and Always (Canaan Records)
- 1972: The Best of the LeFevres (Sing Records)
- 1973: Happiness Is Gospel (Canaan Records)
- 1974: Stepping on the Clouds (Canaan Records)
- 1975: Experience (Canaan Records)
- 1975: The LeFevres (Power Pak) (compilation)
- 1976: Gospel Music USA (Canaan Records)
- 1976: Whispering Hope (Pickwick)
- 1977: Singing 'Til He Comes (Canaan Records)
- 1977: 16 All-Time Favorites (Starday Records)
- 1983: Come into the Light (Calvary)
- 1985: The Old Rugged Cross (Golden Circle Records)
- 2000: Echoes From the Forties (Bibletone Records)
