= Hovie Lister =

American gospel musician, Baptist Minister, and politician (1926–2001)

- Born: Hovie Franklin Lister; September 17, 1926; Greenville, South Carolina, United States
- Died: December 28, 2001 (aged 75)
- Genre: Southern gospel
- Instrument: piano

Hovie Franklin Lister (September 17, 1926 – December 28, 2001) was an American gospel musician, Baptist Minister, and politician. Lister was best known for his time as the front man of the Statesmen Quartet, a renowned Southern Gospel quartet in the decades of the 1950s and 1960s.

== Biography ==
Lister was born in Greenville, South Carolina, and learned piano from the age of six. He accompanied a singing group composed of his father and three of his uncles (The Lister Brothers Quartet) at 14, and toured with Mordecai Ham at the same age. He attended the Stamps-Baxter School of Music in Dallas.

Following his education, Lister served as an accompanist for The Lefevres, The Homeland Harmony, and The Rangers Quartet in the 1940s. In 1948, he formed The Statesmen Quartet, and remained the group's anchor for decades. Lister's style, which differed from his predecessor's styles in its incorporation of jazz, soul and ragtime idioms over the staid, solemn accompaniment of prior generations, influenced the sound of gospel and CCM in the later 20th century. From 1981 to 1988 Lister was part of the Masters V. From 1989 to 1991, he joined the Palmetto State Quartet. Lister remained a member of The Statesmen Quartet into his illness and death.

Aside from performing, Lister also had interests in music publishing and promotion. Lister was inducted into the Southern Gospel Hall of Fame in 1997.
