= List of gospel musicians =

This incomplete list is specifically for Christian music performers in the gospel music genres who have either been very important to the genre, or have had a considerable amount of exposure. This list includes artists that perform in traditional gospel music genres such as Southern gospel, traditional black gospel, urban contemporary gospel, gospel blues, Christian country music, Celtic gospel and British black gospel as well as artists in the general market who have recorded music in these genres. This list is not designed to include performers in the greater Christian music industry specifically contemporary Christian music performers and its subgenres.

Bands are listed by the first letter in their name (not including the words "a", "an", or "the"), and individuals are listed by family name.

== A ==
- Lee Roy Abernathy
- Jolly Abraham
- Rodolfo Abrantes
- Faye Adams
- Oleta Adams
- Yolanda Adams
- Doris Akers
- The Akins
- Alabama Sacred Harp Singers
- Tope Alabi
- Mary Alessi
- Charles McCallon Alexander
- The Rance Allen Group
- Lu Alone
- Feliciano Amaral
- Anointed
- The Anointed Pace Sisters
- Inez Andrews
- Vanessa Bell Armstrong
- Ada Ehi

== B ==
- Annastasia Baker
- Philip Bailey
- Bonny B.
- The Barrett Sisters
- Aline Barros
- Nathaniel Bassey
- Helen Baylor
- Elder Charles D. Beck
- TY Bello
- The Blackwood Brothers
- The Blind Boys of Alabama
- Dante Bowe
- Irene Bridger
- Anthony Brown & Group Therapy
- Clint Brown
- Nehemiah Hunter Brown
- Fernanda Brum
- Anthony Burger
- Kim Burrell
- Moses Bliss
- Myron Butler
- Wanda Nero Butler

== C ==
- Shirley Caesar
- Byron Cage
- Erica Campbell
- Jesse Campbell
- Lamar Campbell
- Teddy Campbell
- Tina Campbell
- Warryn Campbell
- The Caravans
- Jekalyn Carr
- Kurt Carr
- Isaac Carree
- Casey J
- Johnny Cash
- Cassiane
- Cláudio Castro
- Alvin Chea
- Mercy Chinwo
- Jacky Clark-Chisholm
- Wayne Christian
- The Clark Sisters
- Mattie Moss Clark
- Elbernita "Twinkie" Clark
- Rev. James Cleveland
- Cheryl "Coko" Clemons
- Tasha Cobbs Leonard
- Dorothy Love Coates
- Sam Cooke
- Dorinda Clark-Cole
- Marcus Cole
- Daryl Coley
- Commissioned
- Zacardi Cortez
- The Crabb Family
- Beverly Crawford
- Latice Crawford
- Andraé Crouch
- Sandra Crouch
- Adlan Cruz

== D ==
- Damares
- Montrell Darrett
- Carlene Davis
- Reverend Gary Davis
- The Davis Sisters
- Ricky Dillard
- The Dixie Hummingbirds
- Jessy Dixon
- Thomas A. Dorsey
- Holly Dunn
- Bob Dylan
- Don Moen

== E ==
- Frank Edwards
- Ella
- Michael English
- Ralna English
- Anthony Evans, Jr.

== F ==
- Marco Feliciano
- Ludmila Ferber
- Five Blind Boys of Mississippi
- Flordelis
- A. C. and Mamie Forehand
- Forever Jones
- James Fortune
- Maxx Frank
- Kirk Franklin (with The Family, God's Property, and INC)
- Aretha Franklin
- Randall Franks
- Marine Friesen
- Futrel

== G ==
- Bill Gaither
- Cassietta George
- Lara George
- Geoffrey Golden
- The Golden Gate Quartet
- God's Property
- Jade Trini Goring
- Al Green
- Travis Greene
- Bessie Griffin
- Greater Vision
- Guy & Ralna
- Guvna B

== H ==
- Ernie Haase
- Damita Haddon
- Deitrick Haddon
- Brother Will Hairston
- Danniebelle Hall
- James Hall
- Marshall Hall
- MC Hammer song on every album including: Family Affair
- Fred Hammond
- Wes Hampton
- Larnelle Harris
- Harvest
- Edwin Hawkins (and the Edwin Hawkins Singers)
- Tramaine Hawkins
- Walter Hawkins
- Cory Henry
- Jake Hess
- Darwin Hobbs
- Danny Hollis
- Dave Hollister
- The Hoppers
- Israel Houghton
- Cissy Houston
- Whitney Houston album: The Preacher's Wife: Original Soundtrack Album
- Guy Hovis
- Norman Hutchins

== I ==
- The Imperials

== J ==
- Judy Jacobs
- Alan Jackson
- Mahalia Jackson
- T.D. Jakes
- Janires
- The Rev. Andrew Jenkins
- Blind Willie Johnson
- Keith "Wonderboy" Johnson
- Le'Andria Johnson
- Bobby Jones
- Canton Jones
- Cheneta Jones
- Mitchell Jones
- Forever Jones
- Jamie Grace

== K ==
- John P. Kee
- Tori Kelly
- Ron Kenoly
- Bridgett Kern
- Joey Kibble
- Karima Kibble
- Klaudt Indian Family
- Gladys Knight
- Kari Jobe

== L ==
- Patti LaBelle
- Nikki Laoye
- Donald Lawrence
- Doyle Lawson
- Lowell Lewis
- Bishop Eddie Long
- Sérgio Lopes
- Dorothy Love Coates
- Patrick Love
- Loretta Lynn
- Lee Williams
- London Community Gospel Choir

== M ==
- Luther Magby
- Mali Music
- Rebecca Malope
- Mandisa
- Tamela Mann
- Delino Marçal
- Chris Marion
- Roberta Martin
- Sallie Martin
- Mary Mary
- Maverick City Music
- Marvin Sapp
- Brother Joe May
- Oris Mays
- Donnie McClurkin
- Liz McComb
- Lisa McClendon
- William McDowell
- The McKameys
- Shawn McLemore
- Jonathan McReynolds
- Cristina Mel
- Men of Standard
- Mercy River Boys
- Mighty Clouds of Joy
- Mississippi Mass Choir
- Lydia Moisés
- Ericson Alexander Molano
- Chandler Moore
- Soraya Moraes
- Wess Morgan
- Bishop Paul S. Morton, Sr.
- J. Moss
- Nicole C. Mullen
- Martha Munizzi
- Henrie Mutuku
- Moses Bliss
- MOG Music

== N ==
- Mattos Nascimento
- André Neles
- Jonathan Nelson
- Aaron Neville
- Ana Nóbrega
- Smokie Norful
- Dorothy Norwood
- Nosa

== O ==
- Oak Ridge Boys
- Obiwon
- Muyiwa Olarewaju
- Andréia de Olicar
- One Nation Crew
- Out of Eden

== P ==
- LaShun Pace
- Sista Monica Parker
- Dolly Parton
- Gary S. Paxton
- Guy Penrod
- Dottie Peoples
- Perlla
- David Phelps
- Washington Phillips
- Wintley Phipps
- Isadora Pompeo
- Doobie Powell
- Elvis Presley
- Billy Preston
- Charley Pride
- Earnest Pugh
- Lowell Pye
- Planetshakers
- Patrice Wilson

== Q ==
- Qqu
- David Quinlan

== R ==
- Lynda Randle
- Jessica Reedy
- Karl Reid
- Little Richard
- Noel Robinson
- Gabriela Rocha
- Woody Rock
- Deise Rosa
- Thurman Ruth aka Thermon Ruth, T. Ruth

== S ==
- Davi Sacer
- Israel Salazar
- Samsong
- Papa San
- Ira D. Sankey
- Marvin Sapp
- Briana Scott
- Guy Sebastian
- Marilyn Sellars
- Sensational Nightingales
- Karen Clark Sheard
- Kierra "Kiki" Sheard
- Sarah Sheeva
- Sinach
- Nívea Soares
- Juliano Son
- The Soul Stirrers
- Sounds of Blackness
- Singing Christians
- Richard Smallwood
- Micah Stampley
- The Statler Brothers
- The Staple Singers
  - Pops Staples
  - Mavis Staples
- Keith Staten
- Candi Staton
- Ruben Studdard
- The Swan Silvertones
- Jimmy Swaggart

== T ==
- Tamela Mann
- Take 6
- Sister Rosetta Tharpe
- Charles Davis Tillman
- Tonéx
- Trin-i-tee 5:7
- Tye Tribbett
- Travis Greene

== V ==
- Yolanda Vadiz
- Ana Paula Valadão
- André Valadão
- Mariana Valadão
- Gary Valenciano
- Joe Vasconcelos
- Táta Vega
- Virtue

== W ==
- The Wades
- Hezekiah Walker
- Albertina Walker
- Clara Ward
- Mervyn Warren
- Dionne Warwick
- Rosalie "Lady Tamborine" Washington
- Gillian Welch
- Kirk Whalum
- Thomas Whitfield
- Marva Whitney
- Deniece Williams
- Hank Williams
- Lee Williams and the Spiritual QC's
- Marion Williams
- Michelle Williams
  - The Williams Brothers
  - Doug Williams
  - Melvin Williams
- Vanessa Williams
- Anita Wilson
- Brian Courtney Wilson
- Ed Wilson
- Elder Roma Wilson
- The Winans Family
  - The Winans
  - BeBe & CeCe Winans
  - BeBe Winans
  - CeCe Winans
  - Juan Winans
  - Mario Winans
  - Marvin Winans
  - Pop Winans
  - Ron Winans
  - Vickie Winans

== Y ==
- Youthful Praise

== Z ==
- Tati Zaqui

== See also ==
- List of Christian vocal artists
- List of Christian worship music artists
- List of country music performers
- List of popular music performers
- List of rock and roll artists
