= Danny Hollis =

American singer-songwriter

- Genres: Southern gospel; Christian country music; CCM
- Years active: 1973–present
- Labels: Canaan

Danny Hollis is a Christian country music singer-songwriter who was a finalist for a Grammy Award in 1980 as a member of the Mercy River Boys. He has toured across the United States for over fifty years, performing as a member of several bands, a studio guitarist, and as a solo artist. Danny Hollis is in the Texas Gospel Music Hall of Fame as a former member of the Singing Christians and the Mercy River Boys.

Danny Hollis began his musical journey as the guitarist and lead singer of the Journeymen Quartet in 1974. In 1977, he joined the Singing Christians, recording one album on Canaan Records. He also toured with Wally Fowler, and Jimmie Davis playing electric guitar.

In 1979, Danny Hollis and seven other musicians formed the Mercy River Boys. They recorded an album, ”Breakout” Canaan Records. The album crossed over from Southern Gospel to Country music, recording hits in multiple music genres. The album was a finalist for the prestigious NARAS’ Grammy Award in 1980 for ’Best Gospel Performance Traditional.’ The album was also nominated for the Gospel Music Association’s Dove Award.

The Mercy River Boys disbanded in 1984. Danny, Emory Atkins and Ronny Ricks started a new Christian country band, Paradise. He recorded two albums on Englwood Records, ’God Bless The U.S.A.’ and ’Invade the Darkness.’

Danny continues to live in East Texas and performs country music. In 2015, Wayne Christian, Emory Atkins, Danny Hollis, and the original eight members of the Mercy River Boys were inducted into the Texas Gospel Music Hall of Fame.

== Discography ==
Year	Album	Label
1974	Take A Journey with the Journeymen (The Journeymen)	Rainbow Records
1976	Sounds of Time (The Journeymen)	Rainbow Records
1978	Refresh Our Spirit (Singing Christians)	Canaan Records
1979	Breakout Mercy River Boys	Canaan Records
1985	God Bless The USA, Paradise	Englewood Records
1986	Following Him, Paradise (Single)	Englewood Records
1987	Show Them, Paradise (Single)	Englewood Records
1989	Invade The Darkness, Paradise	Englewood Records
2017	The Danny Hollis Band (Danny Hollis)	DHB Records
