= West Mecklenburg High School =

American public school in North Carolina

Location
- 7400 Tuckaseegee Rd; Charlotte, North Carolina 28214; United States; 35°14′51″N 80°57′09″W

Information
- Other name: West Meck; West
- Type: Public
- Established: 1951 (75 years ago)
- School district: Charlotte-Mecklenburg Schools
- CEEB code: 340705
- Principal: Kevin Sudimack
- Staff: 74.61 (on an FTE basis)
- Enrollment: 1,290 (2024–2025)
- Student to teacher ratio: 17.29
- Colors: Maroon and white
- Athletics: NCHSAA 7A
- Athletics conference: Greater Charlotte 7A/8A
- Nickname: Hawks
- Website: westmecklenburghs.cmsk12.org

West Mecklenburg High School, colloquially known as West Meck, is a high school located in Charlotte, North Carolina, United States. It is part of the Charlotte-Mecklenburg School System and was opened in 1951. The sports teams are known as the Hawks. Besides providing the standard state-mandated high school curriculum, the school also hosts several programs designed for advanced study, including the Academy for Medical Science, the Academy for Tourism and Travel, and Academy of International Languages.

== History ==
Upon opening in 1951, the school's original mascot was known as the West Meck Indian. The yearbook corresponded to the theme by being known as The Tomahawk. West Mecklenburg's mascot has since been changed to the Hawks.

== Athletics ==
West Mecklenburg High School is a member of the North Carolina High School Athletic Association (NCHSAA) and is classified as a 7A school. It is a part of the Greater Charlotte 7A/8A Conference. Sport teams at West Mecklenburg High School include:

- Football
- Flag Football
- Cheerleading
- Soccer
- Volleyball
- Cross country
- Golf
- Tennis
- Basketball
- Track and field
- Swimming
- Wrestling
- Baseball
- Softball

== Notable alumni ==
- Dyami Brown, NFL wide receiver
- DJ Glaze, NFL offensive tackle
- Tommy Helms, former MLB player and manager, 2x All-Star with the Cincinnati Reds, member of the Cincinnati Reds Hall of Fame
- Jason Latour, comic book artist and writer\
- Patrick Love, Gospel musician, songwriter, producer
- Jalan McClendon, professional football player
- Naya Tapper, U.S. Olympic rugby player, bronze medalist in women's rugby sevens at 2024 Summer Olympics
- J'Mari Taylor, NFL running back
- Chad Tracy, MLB third baseman
- Gene Whisnant, American politician, member of the Oregon House of Representatives
- Shaun Wilson, NFL running back
