= 2010 Texas elections =

- November 2, 2010

Elections were held in Texas on Tuesday, November 2, 2010. Primary elections were held on March 2, 2010.

The Republican Party continued its dominance over Texas politics, maintaining control of all statewide offices and increasing its majorities in both chambers of the Texas Legislature. The GOP also picked up control of three additional seats in the United States House of Representatives.

== Federal ==
=== United States House of Representatives ===
All 32 Texas seats in the United States House of Representatives were up for election in 2010.

== State ==
=== Governor ===
Incumbent Republican Governor Rick Perry ran for re-election against Democratic challenger and former mayor of Houston Bill White and several third-party candidates, and won.

=== Lieutenant governor ===
Former Texas State Senate President,Incumbent Republican Lieutenant Governor David Dewhurst ran for re-election and won.

Results by county Dewhurst: 40–50%; 50–60%; 60–70%; 70–80%; 80–90%; 90–100%; Chavez-Thompson: 40–50%; 50–60%; 60–70%; 70–80%

=== Attorney general ===
Incumbent Republican Greg Abbott ran for re-election as Texas Attorney General against Democrat Barbara Ann Radnofsky and Libertarian candidate Jon Roland, and won.

=== Commissioner of Agriculture ===
Incumbent Republican Commissioner Todd Staples successfully ran for re-election to a second term.

==== Republican primary ====
===== Candidates =====
- Todd Staples, incumbent commissioner of agriculture

===== Results =====
Republican primary results
Party	Candidate	Votes	%
Republican	Todd Staples (incumbent)	1,110,353	100.00%
Total votes		1,110,353	100.0%

==== Democratic primary ====
===== Candidates =====
- Hank Gilbert, cattle rancher, nominee for the same office in 2006
- Kinky Friedman, musician, novelist, and candidate for governor in 2006

Results of the 2010 Agricultural Commissioner Democratic Primary by County County Results: Gilbert: 50–60% 60–70% 70–80% 100% Friedman: 50–60% 60–70%

===== Results =====
Democratic primary results
Party	Candidate	Votes	%
Democratic	Hank Gilbert	311,087	52.31%
Democratic	Kinky Friedman	283,614	47.69%
Total votes		594,701	100.0%

==== General election ====
===== Results =====
2010 Texas agricultural commissioner election
Party	Candidate	Votes	%	±%
Republican	Todd Staples (incumbent)	2,953,775	60.82%	
Democratic	Hank Gilbert	1,738,456	35.80%	
Libertarian	Rick Donaldson	164,035	3.38%	
Total votes		4,856,266	100.0%	
Republican hold				

Results by county Staples: 50–60%; 60–70%; 70–80%; 80–90%; 90–100%; Gilbert: 40–50%; 50–60%; 60–70%; 70–80%

=== Comptroller of Public Accounts ===
Comptroller general results by county Combs: 50–60%; 60–70%; 70–80%; 80–90%; 90–100%

=== Land Commissioner ===
2010 Texas Land Commissioner election
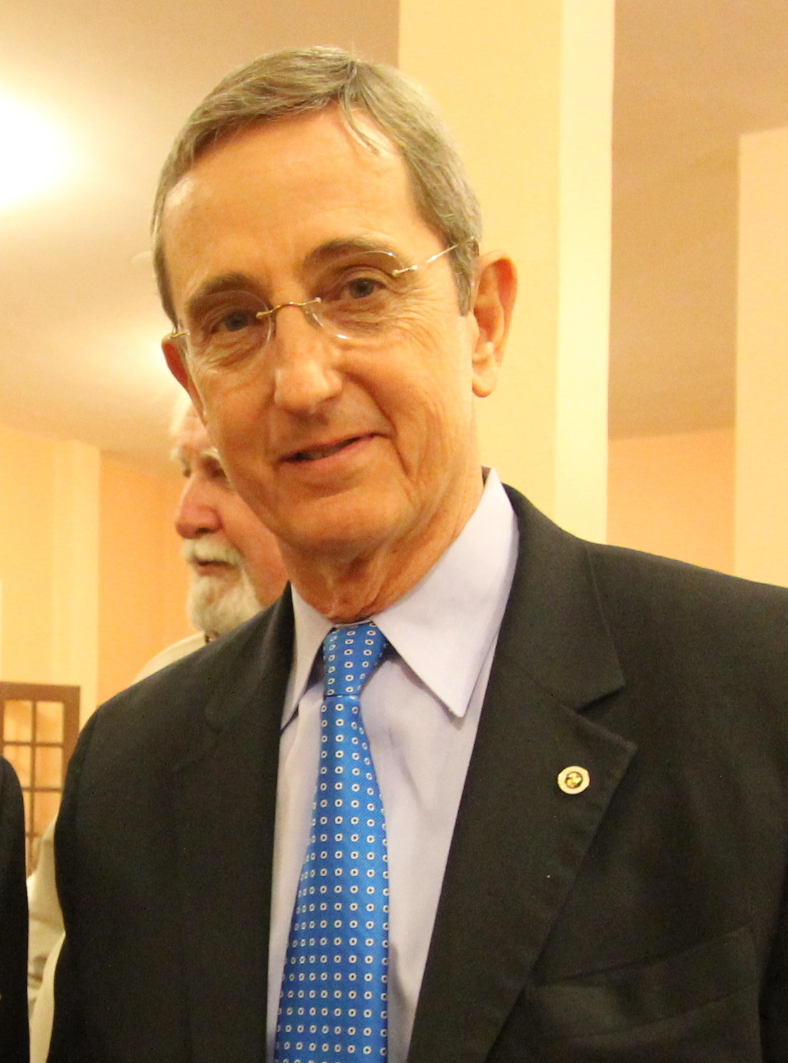

Nominee	Jerry E. Patterson	Hector Uribe
Party	Republican	Democratic
Popular vote	3,001,736	1,717,518
Percentage	61.6%	35.2%
- County results Patterson: 40–50% 50–60% 60–70% 70–80% 80–90% >90% Uribe: 40–50% 50–60% 60–70% 70–80% 80–90%
Land Commissioner before election
Jerry E. Patterson
Republican
Elected Land Commissioner
Jerry E. Patterson
Republican

=== Railroad Commissioner ===
2010 Texas Railroad Commissioner election
- November 4, 2008
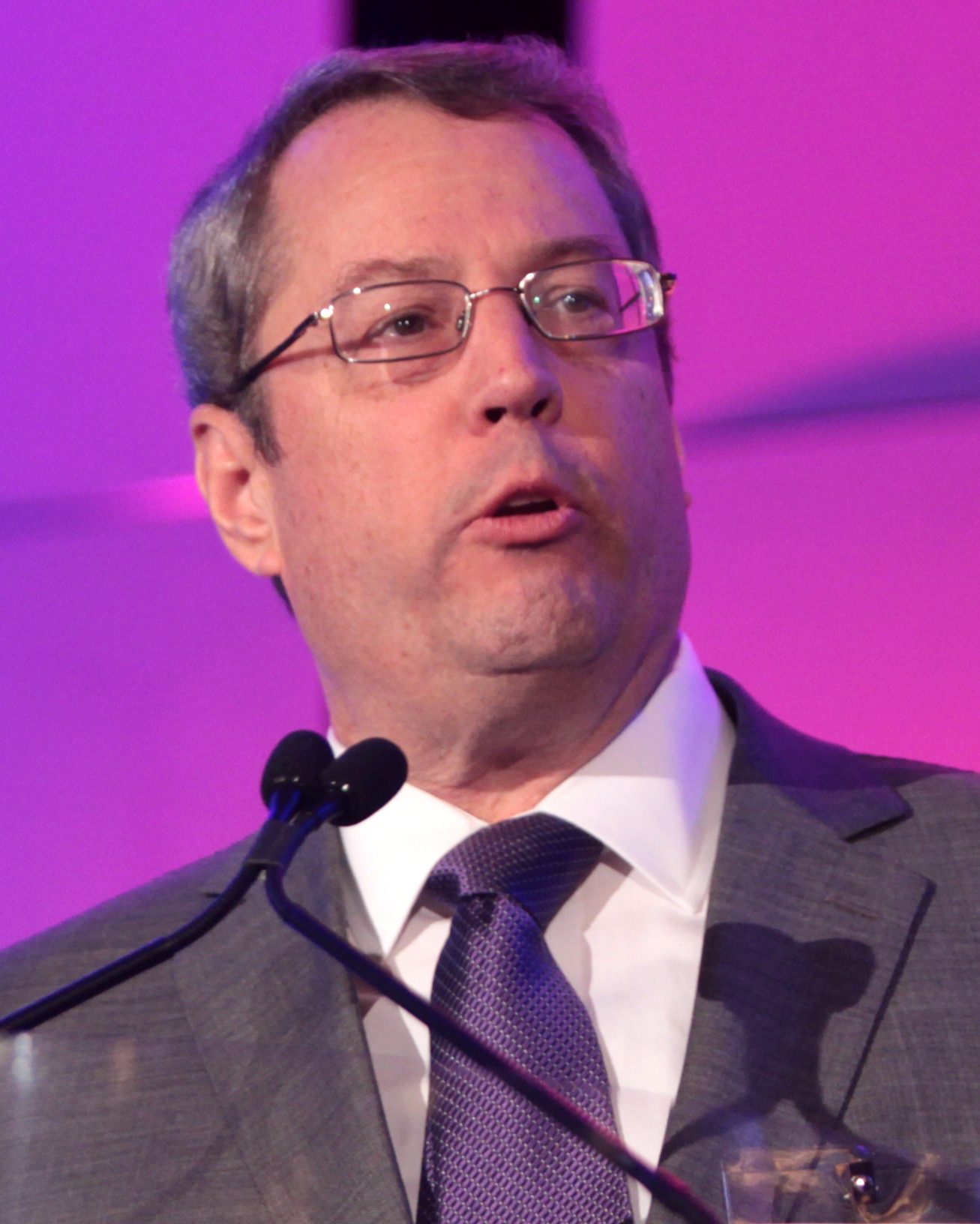

Nominee	David J. Porter	Jeff Weems
Party	Republican	Democratic
Popular vote	2,880,765	1,757,183
Percentage	59.41	36.24
- County results Porter: 40–50% 50–60% 60–70% 70–80% 80–90% >90% Weems: 40–50% 50–60% 60–70% 70–80%
Railroad Commissioner before election
Victor G. Carrillo
Republican
Elected Railroad Commissioner
David J. Porter
Republican

Incumbent commissioner Victor G. Carrillo lost the Republican primary to David J. Porter, who defeated Democratic candidate Jeff Weems in the general election.

2010 Texas Railroad Commissioner election
Party	Candidate	Votes	%
Republican	David J. Porter	2,880,765	59.41
Democratic	Jeff Weems	1,757,183	36.24
Libertarian	Roger Gary	138,978	2.87
Green	Art Browning	72,291	1.49
Total votes		4,849,217	100.0
Republican hold			

=== Legislative elections ===
==== Texas House of Representatives ====
All 150 seats in the Texas House of Representatives were up for election in 2010. The GOP captured 99 seats (a record), including 22 that were held by Democrats after the 2008 Texas House of Representatives election. This left the Democrats with 51 seats. Edmund Kuempel, the incumbent GOP candidate for the District 44 seat, subsequently died; the seat was filled by a special election on December 14 and won by his son, John, also a Republican. Also on December 14, two Democrats (Allan Ritter and Aaron Peña) announced they were switching parties and joining the Republicans, thus giving the GOP 101 seats, and a 2/3 majority in the House, giving them considerable leverage. Under Texas law, any bill which passes with 2/3 of both legislative chambers can become effective immediately upon the governor's signature (otherwise a bill does not become effective until September 1, the start of Texas' fiscal year). This also meant that the Democrats could not quorum bust, or deprive the House of the 2/3 of members required for operation.

Affiliation	Party (Shading indicates majority caucus)		Total	
Affiliation	Republican	Democratic	Total	Vacant
Beginning of the 81st legislature	76	74	150	0
Before 2010 elections	77	72	149	1
Voting share	51%	48%		
After 2010 elections	99	51	150	0
Beginning of the 82nd legislature	101	49	150	0
Voting share	67%	33%		

==== Texas Senate ====
Approximately half of the 31 seats of the Texas Senate were up for election in 2010.

Affiliation	Party (Shading indicates majority caucus)		Total	
Affiliation	Republican	Democratic	Total	Vacant
Before 2010 elections	19	12	31	0
Voting share	61%	39%		
After 2010 elections	19	12	31	0
Voting share	61%	39%		

=== Judicial positions ===
Multiple judicial positions were up for election in 2010, including three justices on the Texas Supreme Court.

- Texas judicial elections, 2010 at Judgepedia

Candidates for Dallas County Court Criminal Court No. 8 were:

- Deandra Grant (Republican)
- Tina Yoo (Democrat; currently known as Tina Yoo Clinton)

=== Ballot measures ===
There are no statewide ballot measures in Texas in 2010.

== Local ==
Many elections for county and city offices were also held on November 2, 2010.
