= Texas Gospel Music Hall of Fame =

Hall of fame for gospel music

Coordinates: 35.7962°N 83.5338°W

The Texas Gospel Music Hall of Fame, created by the Texas Gospel Music Association, is a Hall of Fame dedicated exclusively to recognizing meaningful contributions by individuals and groups in all forms of gospel music.

== Inductees ==
This is a list of those inducted into the Texas Gospel Music Association's: Texas Gospel Music Hall of Fame, listed alphabetically with the year of induction.

=== Individuals ===
- Duane Allen
- Robert S. Arnold
- Joe Atkinson
- J.R. Baxter
- Les Beasley
- Jim Brady
- Charles F. Brown
- Charlie Campbell
- Burl Carter
- Cynthia Clawson
- Wayne Christian
- Ike Davis
- Jack Davis
- Paul De La Torre
- Doc Dooley
- Curtis Elkins
- Jane Robin Ellis
- Tom & Marie Ellis
- Larry Ford
- James Fudge
- Lee Gann
- Marian Garner
- Larry Gatlin
- Rudy Gatlin
- Billy Grable
- Lee Owens Graves
- Curley & Billie Gatlin
- Art Greenhaw
- John Hall
- Martha & Neely Ham
- Johnnie High
- Lou Wills Hildreth
- Pat Hoffmaster
- Dallas Holm
- Arnold Hyles
- Kurt Kaiser
- Kate Laswell
- Merle Conn Longnecker
- Chris & Diane Machen
- Bill Mack
- Harold & Jean Marshall
- Roger McDuff
- Gary McSpadden
- Walt Mills
- Marvin Montgomery
- John & Eunice Morrison
- Easmon Napier
- W. B. Nowlin
- Jerry Oliver
- Glen Payne
- Guy Penrod
- John Points
- Cecil Pollock
- Larry Randall
- J. Howard & Helen Rogers
- “Smilin” Joe Roper
- Billie Rothfus
- David Sapp
- Larry Scott
- Glenn Sessions
- Marion Snider
- Frank Stamps
- Virgil O. Stamps
- Robert Sterling
- Jack Taylor
- Rod Treme
- Mickey Vaughn
- Glenn Wilson
- Jim Wesson
- A. B. (Pop) Wills
- Bob L. Wills
- Calvin & Lillie Wills
- Joe Willis

=== Groups ===
- The Inspirationals
- The Campbell Family (Houston)
- The Friendly Four Quartet
- The Galileans
- The Gatlin Family
- The original Chuck-wagon Gang
- The Singing Christians
- The Mercy River Boys
- Phillips Family
- Plainsmen Quartet
- The Rangers Quartet
- The Singing Wills Family
- The Stamps Quartet
- The Stamps-Baxter Quartet

== In Memoriam ==
- Charlie Campbell 1938 – 2020
- Gary McSpadden 1943 – 2020
- Walt Mills 1938 – 2020
- Lou Wills Hildreth 1928 – 2019
- Jean Marshall 1942 – 2018
- Kurt Kaiser 1935 – 2018
- Howard Hildreth (The Wills Family) 1926 – 2018
- Les Beasley 1928 – 2018
- Paul DeLatorre 1942 – 2018
- Lillie Wills (The Wills Family) 1928 – 2018

== See also ==
- Southern gospel music
- Christian country music
- Contemporary Christian Music
