= List of Christian country artists =

The following is a list of Christian country artists.

Christian country music, sometimes marketed as country gospel, inspirational country is country music that is written to express either personal or a communal belief regarding Christian life, as well as (in terms of the varying music styles) to give a Christian alternative to mainstream secular music. It originated as a blend of early mountain music, cowboy music, and the music from the plantations of the Deep South. The Encyclopedia of Contemporary Christian Music (2002) defines CCM as "music that appeals to self-identified fans of contemporary Christian music on account of a perceived connection to what they regard as Christianity". Based on this definition, this list includes artists that work in the Christian music industry as well as artists in the general market.

== List ==
- Lauren Alaina
- Bruce Haynes
- Ken Holloway
- Whitehorse
- Josh Baldwin
- Glen Campbell
- Johnny Cash
- Gary Chapman
- Charlie Daniels
- Russell Dickerson
- David Eugene Edwards
- Danny Gokey
- Buddy Greene
- Grandpa Jones
- James Kilbane
- Kris Kristofferson
- Dierks Bentley
- Cristy Lane
- The Louvin Brothers
- Richie McDonald
- Susie McEntire
- Reba McEntire
- Ricky Skaggs
- Whosoever South
- Randy Travis
- Josh Turner
- Carrie Underwood
- Kellie Pickler
- The Oak Ridge Boys
- The Statler Brothers
- The Way
- Cody McCarver

== See also ==
- List of Christian bands and artists by genre
