= Voz da Verdade discography =

- Studio albums: 33
- Live albums: 1
- Compilation albums: 2
- Video albums: 21

Voz da Verdade Discography comprises several studio, live, video and special albums by the Brazilian band Voz da Verdade. The band has more than 5,000,000 records sold, in addition to certificates of gold, platinum, double platinum, triple platinum and diamond.

== Albums ==
=== Studio albums ===
Year	Title	Certification
1978	Quem é o Caminho?	(Brazil) (not available)
1979	Consumado	(Brazil) (not available)
1981	Linda Manhã	(Brazil) (not available)
1982	Livre	(Brazil) (not available)
1983	Encontro Eterno	(Brazil) (not available)
1984	Vem Buscar	(Brazil) (not available)
1985	Facho de Luz	(Brazil) (not available)
1986	Cristo Reina	(Brazil) (not available)
1987	Sangue Cor Púrpura	(Brazil) (not available)
1988	Além do Rio Azul	(Brazil) (not available)
1989	Coração de Cera	(Brazil) (not available)
1990	Um Grito de Liberdade	(Brazil) : Gold
1991	Magnífico	(Brazil) : Gold
1992	Imagem de Deus	(Brazil) : Gold
1993	Não é Tarde Demais	(Brazil) : Gold
1994	Desejo de Vida	(Brazil) : Gold
1995	Os Anjos	(Brazil) : +500.000; MCK: Double Platinum
1996	Majestade	(Brazil) : 520.000; MCK: Double Platinum
1997	Coração Valente	(Brazil) : +1.000.000; MCK: Diamond
1998	Quando Deus se Cala	(Brazil) : 760.000; MCK: Triple Platinum
1999	O Espelho	(Brazil) : 450.000; MCK: Platinum
2000	Deus Dormiu Lá em Casa	(Brazil) : 800.000; MCK: Triple Platinum
2001	Projeto no Deserto	(Brazil) : 1.000.000; MCK: Diamond
2002	Somos mais que Vencedores	(Brazil) : .750.000; MCK: Triple Platinum
2003	O Melhor de Deus está Por Vir	(Brazil) : +1.000.000; MCK: Diamond
2003	Os Três Primeiros	(Brazil) : (not available)
2004	Sonhos	(Brazil) : 375.000; MCK: Triple Platinum
2005	Ainda Estou Aqui	(Brazil) : 320.000; MCK: Double Platinum
2006	Filho de Leão	(Brazil) : 300.000; MCK: Triple Platinum
2009	Chuva de Sangue	(Brazil) : 100.000; MCK: Platinum
2011	Eu Acredito	(Brazil) : 50.000; MCK: Gold
2014	Heróis	(Brazil) : 35.000; MCK: --
2018	Até Aqui eu Cheguei	(Brazil) : --; MCK: --

=== Live albums ===
Year	Title	Certification
2008	30 Anos	(Brazil) : 270.000; MCK: Platinum

== Videography ==
Year	Title
1991	Um Grito de Liberdade (ao vivo)
1992	Magnífico (ao vivo)
1993	Imagem de Deus (ao vivo)
1994	Não é Tarde Demais (ao vivo)
1995	Desejo de Vida (ao vivo)
1996	Os Anjos (ao vivo)
1997	Majestade (ao vivo)
1998	Coração Valente (ao vivo)
1999	Quando Deus se Cala (ao vivo)
2000	O Espelho (ao vivo)
2001	Deus Dormiu lá em Casa (ao vivo)
2002	Projeto no Deserto (ao vivo)
2003	Somos mais que Vencedores (ao vivo)
2004	O Melhor de Deus está por Vir (ao vivo)
2005	Sonhos (ao vivo)
2006	Ainda Estou Aqui (ao vivo)
2007	Filho de Leão (ao vivo)
2008	30 Anos
2010	Chuva de Sangue (ao vivo)
2012	Eu Acredito (ao vivo)
2015	Heróis (ao vivo)

== Especials ==
Year	Title
1994	O Homem que encontrou Jesus no Cinema
2001	Melhores Momentos
2007	Voz de Ouro
