= Lists of Christian bands and artists by genre =

This article contains links to lists of notable Christian music artists, organized by music genre.

Note: Because classifying music by genre can be arbitrary, these groupings are generalized and many artists appear on multiple lists.

- List of Christian country artists
- List of Christian death metal bands
- List of Christian hardcore bands
- List of Christian hip hop artists
- List of Christian metal artists
- List of 1970s Christian pop artists
- List of Christian punk bands
- List of Christian rock bands
- List of Christian ska bands
- List of Christian vocal artists
- List of Christian worship music artists
- List of gospel musicians
- List of Nigerian gospel musicians
- List of unblack metal artists
