= Singing Christians =

Former Southern Gospel Band

- Genres: Southern gospel
- Years active: 1973–1979
- Label: Canaan
- Spinoffs: Mercy River Boys

The Singing Christians were a Southern gospel music band. They released five albums on the Canaan Records label and charted in the Southern gospel radio markets.

Wayne Christian led the band, performing at concert venues and ’All night gospel singings’ across the deep south and the southwestern United States. In 1975, the group became a regular headliner on the Wally Fowler Show. The band hosted their own music festival in East Texas, featuring many Southern gospel quartets, drawing thousands of Christian music fans each year. The Singing Christians became the first group to perform and headline on the Kerrville Gospel Jubilee.

Several former Singing Christians members impacted the music industry beyond the scope of the group. Wayne Christian served as president of the Gospel Music Association. Starting in 1997, Christian served 16 consecutive years representing District 9 in the Texas House Of Representatives. Gary Goss went on to travel with Governor Jimmie Davis. In 1986, Goss became the music and tour director for Country music singer Johnny Rodriguez. John Mays played bass guitar for the Speer Family after leaving the Singing Christians. He later served as head of Benson Records and Canaan Records. Emory Atkins became a record producer, singer-songwriter, and audio-recording engineer in Nashville, Tennessee.

After the band ended their career as The Singing Christians in 1979, the remaining eight members rebranded themselves as a Christian country music group, changing their name to the Mercy River Boys.

In 2015, Wayne Christian, Emory Atkins, Danny Hollis, Ronny Ricks, Gary Goss, and all the band members of the Singing Christians and Mercy River Boys were inducted into the Texas Gospel Music Hall of Fame.

== Members (past and present) ==
=== Lineups ===
1973–1975	1975–1976	1976–1977
Calvin Christian – tenor; James Christian – lead, fiddle/violin; Wayne Christian – lead; Frank Horton – baritone; Galen Sawyer – drums	Calvin Christian – tenor; James Christian – lead, fiddle/violin; Wayne Christian – lead; Frank Horton – baritone; Rusty Oxford – bass; Gary Goss – piano; Bill Horton – steel guitar; John Mays – bass guitar; Johnny Pope – drums	Calvin Christian – tenor; James Christian – lead, fiddle/violin; Wayne Christian – lead; Frank Horton – baritone; Rusty Oxford – bass; Gary Goss – piano; Emory Atkins – bass guitar
1977–1978	1978–1979
Danny B. Smith – tenor; James Christian – lead, fiddle/violin; Wayne Christian – lead; Danny Hollis – baritone, guitar; Rusty Oxford – bass; Gary Goss – piano; Emory Atkins – bass guitar; Kevin Bailey – electric guitar; Ronny Ricks – drums	Danny B. Smith, tenor; Wayne Christian, lead; Danny Hollis – baritone, guitar; Rusty Oxford – bass; Gary Goss – piano; Emory Atkins – bass guitar; Kevin Bailey – electric guitar; Ronny Ricks – drums

== Discography ==
Year	Album	Label
1973	I’d Rather Live in the Sunshine (The Singing Christians)	
1974	When I Begin to Live My Life (The Singing Christians)	Canaan Records
1975	Good Times are Coming (The Singing Christians)	Canaan Records
1976	The Promise (The Singing Christians)	Canaan Records
1977	Something For Everyone (Singing Christians)	Canaan Records
1978	Refresh Our Spirit (Singing Christians)	Canaan Records
