= C. H. Brown =

The Reverend Charles Hunter Brown
- Born: February 2, 1907; Stony Point, Virginia, U.S.
- Died: January 17, 1996 (aged 88); Charlottesville, Virginia, U.S.
- Occupations: Building contractor; pastor
- Children: 11; including Nehemiah Hunter Brown

Religious life
- Religion: Christianity
- Denomination: Church of God in Christ

Charles Hunter Brown (February 2, 1907 – January 17, 1996) was an American building contractor, pastor and community leader in Albemarle County, Virginia.

== Early life ==
Charles Hunter Brown was born in Stony Point, Virginia, on February 2, 1907.

== Construction career ==
Brown worked as a general building contractor for fifty years, mainly in the Charlottesville area of Virginia. He built around 150 buildings in the city, including the Holy Temple Church of God in Christ where he would serve as pastor.

== Preaching career ==
In early 1959, Brown succeeded Clarence Dunlap as pastor of Holy Temple Church of God in Christ in Charlottesville. At that time, the local denomination was going through a period of turmoil: a May 1959 meeting of Virginia's Church of God in Christ had decided that all churches were free to decide their diocese. The following month, Dunlap and a group of ministers broke into the Holy Temple church building: he claimed to still be in charge of the church as a follower of D. Lawrence Williams and the Second Diocese. Brown and the congregation were instead followers of David C. Love and the First Diocese. The break-in issue was thrown out of court in July 1959.

Brown served as pastor of the Holy Temple Church of God in Christ in Charlottesville for 38 years. His son Ralph described him as "a fire and brimstone preacher".

Brown was also pastor of the Massey Memorial Church in Waynesboro for ten years. He served as Charlottesville district superintendent for the Church of God in Christ from 1985 onwards.

== Personal life ==
Brown was married to Angie Loving Brown. He had five daughters and six sons, including the gospel musician Nehemiah Hunter Brown. Another son, Ralph, succeeded him as pastor of Holy Temple church.

Brown died at home in Charlottesville on January 17, 1996.
