= Lowell Pye =

American gospel musician (born 1970)

- Also known as: Lowell Curtis Pye, Sr.
- Born: Lowell Curtis Pye; March 28, 1970 (age 56); Detroit, Michigan
- Origin: Atlanta, Georgia
- Genres: Gospel, traditional black gospel, urban contemporary gospel
- Occupations: Singer, songwriter
- Instruments: Vocals, singer-songwriter
- Years active: 1989–present (with band); 2010–present (solo)
- Labels: Miralex, Entertainment One
- Member of: Men of Standard

Lowell Curtis Pye (born March 28, 1970) is an American gospel musician. He started his music career, in 1996, with the gospel group Men of Standard, yet his solo career commenced in 2010, with the release of Finally by Miralex Entertainment. His second album, Transformed, was released by Entertainment One in 2014. Both albums charted on Billboard magazine Gospel Albums chart.

== Early life ==
Pye was born in Detroit, Michigan, on March 28, 1970, as Lowell Curtis Pye, after the birth of his son, he goes by Lowell Curtis Pye, Sr. He was reared in the church in his hometown at First Fellowship, and at the age of four was a part of the group called "The Junior Echo's". In 1990, he joined the ministry of John P. Kee, and that lead to his membership in Men of Standard with Isaac Carree.

== Music career ==
His music career got started in 1996, with the gospel music group Men of Standard; however, his solo career commenced in 2010, with the release of Finally by Miralex Entertainment in 2010. This album was his breakthrough release upon the Billboard magazine charts, placing on the Gospel Albums at No. 10. His subsequent album released by Entertainment One Music in 2014, Transformed, charted on the Gospel Albums chart at No. 22.

== Discography ==
List of studio albums, with selected chart positions
| Title | Album details | Peak chart positions |
| Title | Album details | US Gos |
|---|---|---|
| Finally | Released: July 27, 2010; Label: Miralex; CD, digital download | 10 |
| Transformed | Released: January 28, 2014; Label: Entertainment One; CD, digital download | 22 |
