= Whosoever South =

American hip hop group

- Origin: Brunswick, Georgia
- Genres: Christian hip hop, Christian country, country rap, urban gospel, bluegrass
- Years active: 2008–present
- Labels: Pit Bull
- Members: Rowdy Eunice; Sarah Eunice; Mike Mitchell
- Website: whosoeversouth.com

Whosoever South is an American Christian music country rap trio signed to Pit Bull Productions. They released, Goin' Home in 2013, and Come on In in 2014.

== Background ==
The Christian hip hop and Christian country trio started in 2008, with members husband-and-wife, Rowdy and Sarah Eunice, alongside, Mike Mitchell.

== History ==
Whosoever South released Goin' Home, on May 14, 2013, with Pit Bull Productions. Their subsequent release, Come on In, came out on October 7, 2014, from Pit Bull Productions.

== Members ==
- Rowdy Eunice
- Sarah Eunice
- Mike Mitchell

== Discography ==
Studio albums

- Goin' Home (May 14, 2013, Pit Bul Productions)
- Come on In (October 7, 2014, Pit Bull Productions)
- Backroads & Small Towns (October 3, 2019, Pit Bull Productions)
- Riverbank (April 7, 2021, Pit Bull Productions)
- Passing Through (September 6, 2022, Pit Bull Productions)
