= Sérgio Lopes (musician) =

- Born: Sérgio Ricardo Lopes; October 27, 1965 (age 60); Campina Grande, Paraíba
- Origin: Rio de Janeiro, Brazil
- Genres: Contemporary Christian Music
- Occupations: Singer, songwriter, poet, composer
- Instrument: guitar
- Years active: 1990–present
- Labels: Line Records 2011–12; Art Gospel 2005–10; Top Gospel 2001–05; Zekap Gospel 2000–01; Line Records 1996–2000; Som & Louvores 1989–95
- Website: www.sergiolopes.com.br

Sérgio Ricardo Lopes (Campina Grande, October 27, 1965) is a poet, singer and a Christian music composer from Brazil.

== Biography ==
Born on October 27, 1965, in Paraíba, while still in basic education (old primary school), got involved with theater at Colégio Estadual da Liberdade, in Campina Grande, when he knew a friend called Afrânio, with which he shared his own poems or findings from poets such as Augusto dos Anjos and Gonçalves Dias. Son of broadcaster Magidiel Lopes de Souza and Maria das Mercês Lima de Souza, was the oldest of five siblings. His father wrote romantic poems and read them during nocturne broadcasting programs that he broadcast in the AM radios Caturité and Cariri. Sérgio Lopes lost his parents prematurely, for his mother died from cancer at the age of thirty five and his father died in 1998, at the age of forty six. This led him to enroll on the Navy to guarantee his living and the continuation of his studies.

== Discography ==
- 1990 – Nossos Dias (Som & Louvores)
- 1992 – Libertação (Som & Louvores)
- 1993 – O Amigo (Som & Louvores)
- 1994 – Canaan (Som & Louvores)
- 1995 – Sonhos (Som & Louvores)
- 1996 – Vidas e Futuros (Eklesia/Zekap Gospel)
- 1996 – Seleção de Ouro (Line Records/Assoc. Beneficente Cristã-SP)
- 1997 – O Sétimo (Line Records)
- 1998 – Noites e Momentos (Line Records)
- 1999 – A Fé (Line Records)
- 1999 – Cânticos para El Alma – in Spanish (Line Records)
- 2000 – Sérgio Lopes Ao Vivo (Zekap Gospel)
- 2002 – Yeshua: O Nome Hebraico de Jesus (Top Gospel)
- 2003 – Gálatas (Top Gospel)
- 2004 – Apocalipse: Cartas às 7 Igrejas (Top Gospel)
- 2005 – Lentilhas (Top Gospel)
- 2005 – O Amor de Deus (Art Gospel)
- 2007 – Getsêmani (Art Gospel)
- 2008 – Sérgio Lopes – O Poeta da Música Gospel (LGK / Som Livre) – Recovery collection "Seleção de Ouro"
- 2008 – Bethesda (Art Gospel)
- 2009 – Sérgio Lopes Acústico (Art Gospel)
- 2011 – A Melhor Escolha (Line Records)
- 2014 – Coração Discípulo (Sony Music)
- 2017 – Somos (Independente)
