= Elder Roma Wilson =

American gospel harmonica player and singer (1910–2018)

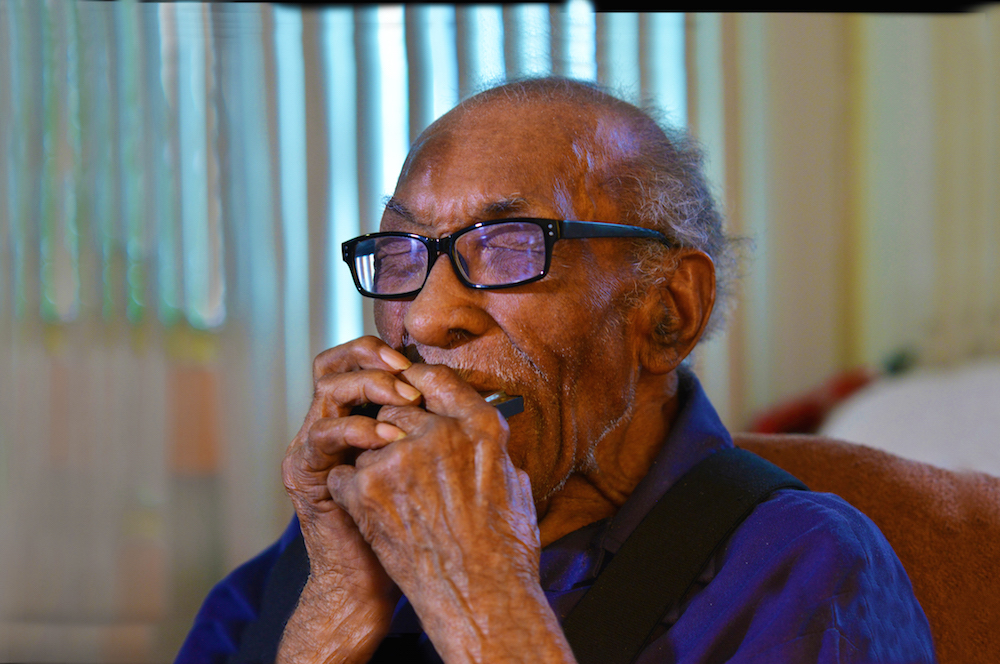
- Wilson in 2015

Background information
- Born: Roma Wilson; December 22, 1910; Hickory Flat, Mississippi, U.S.
- Died: October 25, 2018 (aged 107) Detroit, Michigan, U.S.
- Genres: Gospel
- Occupations: Harmonicist, singer, clergyman
- Instruments: Harmonica, vocals
- Years active: 1930s–2018

Elder Roma Wilson (December 22, 1910 – October 25, 2018) was an American gospel harmonica player and singer. A clergyman, Wilson discovered he had a degree of notability later in his life, having previously been unaware of interest in his work.

== Biography ==
Wilson was born in Hickory Flat, Mississippi, United States. His father was one-half Muscogee. Wilson was a self-taught harmonica player in his early teens, using the discarded instruments of his elder siblings (he had five brothers and four sisters). He developed an unusual "choking" style, derived from the difficulty of soliciting sounds from his well-worn instruments. By the age of fifteen, he was working on the railroad. He later worked at a sawmill. Wilson married at the age of nineteen. He became an ordained minister in the Pentecostal church in 1929, and he joined the self-styled Reverend Leon Pinson, who played the guitar, in traveling across north Mississippi, both playing and preaching. They developed a strong church following.

Wilson moved to Michigan in 1940 and later to Detroit. He continued his musical interests, playing on street corners. In 1948, he played in a record store on Hastings Street in Detroit and was recorded by the shop owner. The owner subsequently allowed the tracks to be released, and students of Wilson's style of playing were intrigued. Wilson was unaware of the attention. Following the death of his first wife, he moved back to Mississippi. He remarried in 1977. By 1989, following a chance telephone call, Wilson reactivated his musical partnership with Pinson. He became aware of global interest in his recordings, which he heard for the first time in 1991. Capitalizing on the notability, he and Pinson played at music festivals, including the Chicago Blues Festival and the New Orleans Jazz & Heritage Festival.

In 1994, Wilson was a recipient of a National Heritage Fellowship from the National Endowment for the Arts, which is the highest honor in the folk and traditional arts in the United States. In that year he also recorded the bulk of the music included on his debut album. Most of tracks on his 1995 LP This Train were recorded when Wilson was in his early eighties. The sides contained a mixture of solo efforts, some accompanied by his wife or with a church choir, and included "Ain't It a Shame", "This Train Is a Clean Train", and "Amazing Grace". The album also included six harmonica-dominated pieces unwittingly recorded with his children in 1948. Wilson was still preaching, singing and playing harmonica in Detroit in 2015, at the age of 104. Wilson died in Detroit, Michigan, on October 25, 2018, at the age of 107.

== Discography ==
Year	Album title	Record label	Reference
1995	This Train	Arhoolie	

== See also ==
- List of gospel musicians
