= Jalan McClendon =

American football player (born 1995)

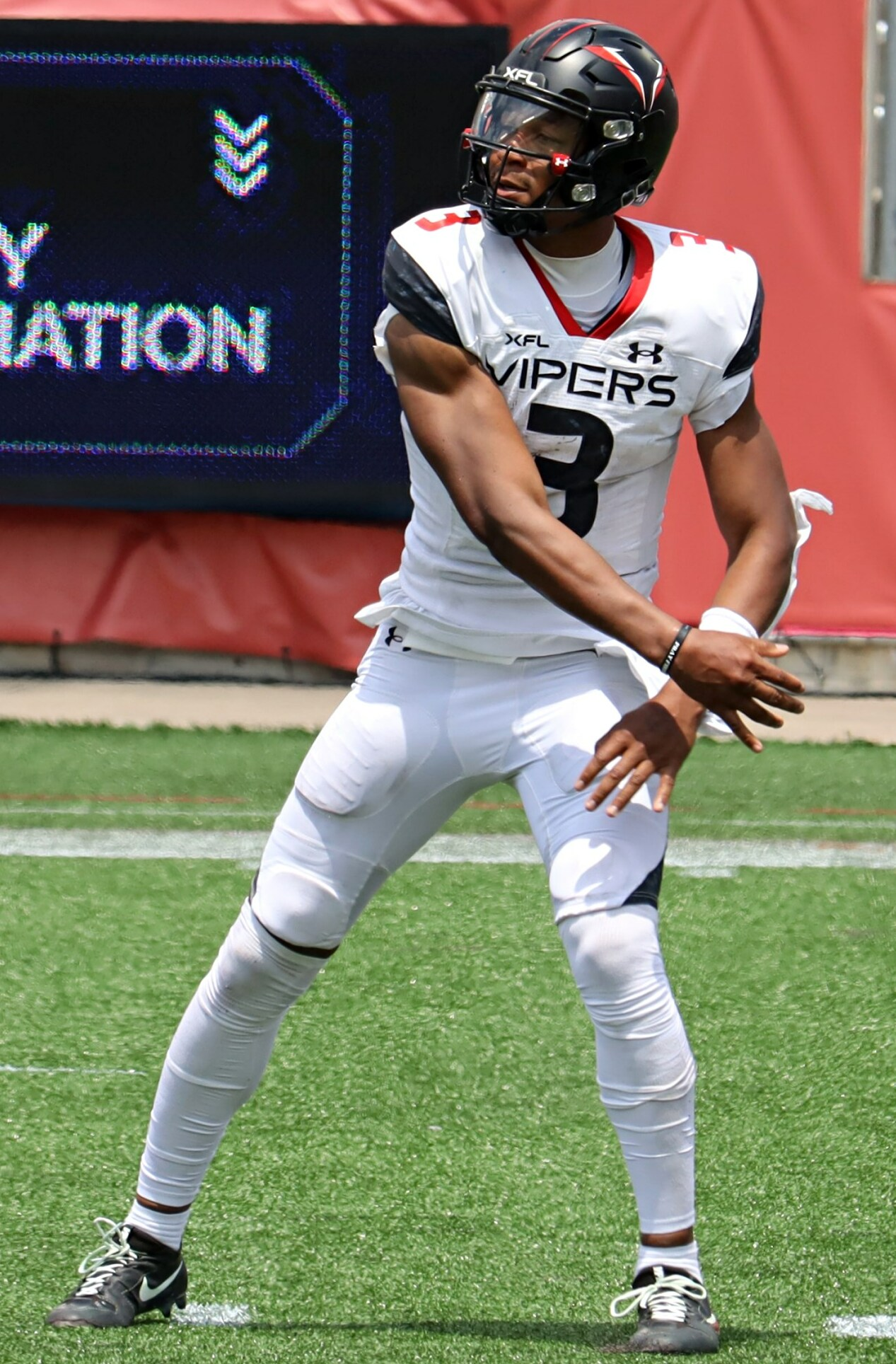
- McClendon with the Vegas Vipers in 2023

No. 8 – Columbus Aviators
- Position: Quarterback
- Roster status: Active

Personal information
- Born: October 21, 1995 (age 31); Charlotte, North Carolina, U.S.
- Listed height: 6 ft 4 in (1.93 m)
- Listed weight: 222 lb (101 kg)

Career information
- High school: West Mecklenburg (Charlotte)
- College: NC State (2014–2017); Baylor (2018)
- NFL draft: 2019: undrafted

Career history
- Baltimore Ravens (2019)*; Washington Redskins (2019)*; Los Angeles Wildcats (2020); Vegas Vipers (2023); DC Defenders (2024); Houston Roughnecks (2025); Columbus Aviators (2026–present)
- * Offseason or practice squad member only

Jalan McClendon (born October 21, 1995) is an American professional football quarterback for the Columbus Aviators of the United Football League (UFL). Initially committing to NC State and serving as a backup quarterback, he played his final year of college football with the Baylor Bears football program. After spending some time in the offseason with both the Baltimore Ravens and the Washington Redskins, McClendon was selected by the Los Angeles Wildcats, where he backed up Josh Johnson at quarterback until the cancellation of the 2020 XFL season due to the COVID-19 pandemic.

== Early life ==
McClendon attended West Mecklenburg High School in Charlotte, North Carolina, playing quarterback for the team, as well as playing some high school basketball. As a junior, he threw for over 1,700 yards and 22 passing touchdowns. As a senior, McClendon led the team to a 9–3 record and the North Carolina 4AA state playoffs, while adding 1,700 passing yards and 17 passing touchdowns.

Graded out as a 3-star quarterback out of high school by Rivals.com, and as a 4-star quarterback by On3.com, and by 247Sports, McClendon received multiple offers and visits from Tennessee, North Carolina, South Carolina, East Carolina, Florida State, Miami (FL), NC State, and Virginia, before ultimately committing to the NC State football team on May 15, 2013, and signing his letter of intent on February 5, 2014.

== College career ==
=== NC State ===
In 2014, McClendon redshirted to preserve his future eligibility.

After Florida transfer quarterback Jacoby Brissett took over the starting quarterback job in 2014, and true freshman quarterback Jakobi Meyers redshirting 2015 and undergoing knee surgery, McClendon played 7 games for NC State as the backup quarterback to Brissett.

Following the 2015 season, Brissett graduated and was selected in the 3rd round of the 2016 NFL draft by the New England Patriots. This opened up a quarterback competition between McClendon and Myers, with Boise State quarterback transfer Ryan Finley joining the NC State football team in 2016. McClendon was able to beat out Myers in the quarterback competition, forcing Meyers to start playing the wide receiver position. However, Finley would win the starting quarterback job, and McClendon for the second season in the row served as the backup quarterback for the NC State football team. McClendon saw more action at quarterback in 2016, scoring his first passing and rushing touchdown in college during September game against the Old Dominion Monarchs, and seeing playing time in 10 games in 2016 at quarterback.

With Finley fully entrenched as the starting quarterback of the NC State, McClendon only appeared in 3 games, and only attempting 3 passes. Following the 2017 season, McClendon graduated from NC State, and transferred to Baylor to play quarterback for the team, with one year of college football eligibility left, and due to Finley being granted an additional year of eligibility by the NCAA.

=== Baylor ===
Brought in to compete for the starting quarterback job for Baylor in 2018, McClendon competed with returning starter Charlie Brewer in the spring, with Brewer ultimately winning the starting job, but McClendon still seeing action at quarterback for the team. McClendon saw his first start at quarterback on November 3, 2018, against Oklahoma State. Despite McClendon's best efforts, Baylor trailed 24–14 in the 3rd quarter, which lead to head coach Matt Rhule to bench McClendon in favor of Brewer. Baylor would come back from behind, and win on a Charlie Brewer touchdown pass to Denzel Mims with 7 seconds remaining. McClendon would not receive another start in 2018, and remained as the backup quarterback for the rest of the year, playing occasionally in 9 games in 2018.

== Professional career ==
Pre-draft measurables
Height	Weight	Arm length	Hand span	Wingspan	40-yard dash	10-yard split	20-yard split	20-yard shuttle	Three-cone drill	Vertical jump	Broad jump
6 ft 4 1/2 in (1.94 m)	222 lb (101 kg)	32 7/8 in (0.84 m)	9 3/4 in (0.25 m)	6 ft 7 1/8 in (2.01 m)	4.82 s	1.68 s	2.73 s	4.40 s	7.09 s	31.5 in (0.80 m)	9 ft 6 in (2.90 m)
All values from the Baylor Pro Day

McClendon went unselected in the 2019 NFL draft.

=== Baltimore Ravens ===
On May 13, 2019, McClendon was signed by the Baltimore Ravens as an undrafted free agent. However, on May 17, McClendon and defensive tackle Kalil Morris were waived and subsequently cut from the Ravens to free up roster spots for Shane Ray and Michael Floyd. McClendon worked out with the New York Giants on July 27, but was not offered a contract by the team.

=== Washington Redskins ===
On August 11, 2019, McClendon was signed by the Washington Redskins after Josh Woodrum was placed on injured reserve for a torn pectoral muscle. McClendon received playing time during the preseason, but completed only 4 out of 10 passes attempted for 16 passing yards, no touchdowns, and one interception. On August 31, McClendon was cut by the team as part of the final cuts to get to the 53-man active roster limit.

Later that week, the New York Giants worked out McClendon, but was once again not offered a contract by the team. On September 23, the Green Bay Packers brought in McClendon for a workout, but was not offered a contract by the team.

=== Los Angeles Wildcats ===
On October 7, 2019, McClendon was one of many quarterbacks included in the draft pool of the 2020 XFL revival. On October 16, McClendon was drafted by the Los Angeles Wildcats during the Phase 5: Open Draft section.

Prior to the Wildcats' first season, McClendon made the team as a backup quarterback for the team leading into their first career game. In the Wildcats' first ever game against the Houston Roughnecks, thanks to an injury to presumptive starting quarterback Josh Johnson going into the game, and an injury to Chad Kanoff, the quarterback that started the Wildcats' first ever game after a big hit, McClendon made his professional football debut, going 1 for 4 (25%) passing, no passing yards, and threw an interception. During the Wildcats' week 3 game against the DC Defenders, McClendon took over at quarterback, recording a 3-yard rush. McClendon would record no other stats for the remainder of the season, and the XFL shut down operations and laid off all employees after week five of their inaugural season.

=== Vegas Vipers ===
On November 15, 2022, McClendon was selected by the Vegas Vipers of the XFL during Phase 0 of the 2023 XFL draft. The Vipers folded when the XFL and USFL merged to create the United Football League (UFL).

=== DC Defenders ===
On January 15, 2024, McClendon was selected by the DC Defenders with the sixth overall pick in the Super Draft portion of the 2024 UFL dispersal draft. He signed with the team on January 22. On November 4, he re-signed with the Defenders.

=== Houston Roughnecks ===
On November 6, 2024, McClendon was traded to the Houston Roughnecks in exchange for CB Kiondre Thomas. McClendon was re-signed by the Roughnecks on July 10, 2025.

=== Columbus Aviators ===
On January 12, 2026, McClendon was allocated to the Columbus Aviators of the United Football League (UFL).

== Career statistics ==
=== Professional ===
Year	Team	League	Games			Passing									Rushing				
Year	Team	League	GP	GS	Record	Cmp	Att	Pct	Yds	Y/A	Lng	TD	Int	Rtg	Att	Yds	Avg	Lng	TD
2020	LA	XFL	5	0	—	1	4	25.0	0	0.0	0	0	1	39.6	2	4	2.0	3	0
2023	VGS	XFL	4	4	1–3	67	112	59.8	873	7.8	84	5	1	95.6	30	137	4.6	18	0
2024	DC	UFL	5	0	—	13	21	61.9	129	6.1	20	0	0	79.3	7	27	3.9	13	1
2025	HOU	UFL	7	6	4–2	147	225	65.3	1,464	6.5	46	6	3	87.0	43	94	2.2	11	1
2026	CLB	UFL	8	8	2–6	155	225	68.9	1,375	6.1	52	8	6	85.7	42	239	5.7	19	2
Career			29	18	7–11	383	587	65.2	3,841	6.5	84	19	11	86.7	124	501	4.0	19	4

=== College ===
Season	Team	Games			Passing								Rushing			
Season	Team	GP	GS	Record	Cmp	Att	Pct	Yds	Y/A	TD	Int	Rtg	Att	Yds	Avg	TD
2014	NC State	0	0	—	Redshirt											
2015	NC State	7	0	—	8	14	57.1	69	4.9	0	0	98.5	5	11	2.2	0
2016	NC State	10	0	—	16	30	53.3	176	5.9	1	4	86.9	35	145	4.1	2
2017	NC State	3	0	—	2	3	66.7	17	5.7	0	0	114.3	6	67	11.2	0
2018	Baylor	9	1	1–0	55	91	60.4	715	7.9	3	3	130.7	34	102	3.0	2
Career		29	1	1–0	81	138	58.7	977	7.1	4	7	117.6	80	325	4.1	4
