= Irene Bridger =

Canadian musician

- Born: Twillingate, Newfoundland, Canada
- Genres: Celtic; Southern Gospel
- Occupation: Singer
- Website: www.irenebridger.ca

Irene Bridger is a gospel musician from Twillingate, Newfoundland and Labrador, Canada. She has worked with audio engineer Dean Stairs. A Heart Full of Love was her first album. In 2005, she released her second album, You. The title track from this album was written by Ada Jenkins, a friend of Bridger. Bridger's album Living Prayer was nominated in the Inspirational Album of the Year category at the 2007 Covenant Awards. She was featured on Hope in the Midst of a Storm, a 2008 album produced in support of the Janeway Children's Health and Rehabilitation Centre. Also in 2008, she performed at Gander Pentecostal Church as part of MusicNL's annual awards and conference. She was nominated for the title of Female Artist of the Year at the 2010 MusicNL awards. The other nominees were Mary Barry, Teresa Ennis, Kellie Loder, and Amelia Curran. In 2012, Bridger released Coming Home, an EP inspired by the music of Newfoundland and Labrador. Despite never having fully written a song herself before, she wrote all of the songs on this album herself.
