= The Akins =

American Gospel music group

The Akins are a Gospel Music group of up to three brothers and their father. They write their own songs and play all of their own instruments.

David, the father, began in 1988 when his three sons Dave, Nick, and Eli were children. While leading music at a youth retreat, David met a man named Jonathan whose father was a well known preaching evangelist and had recently died. Jonathan told David that he knew his father loved him, but he was in high demand and was usually not able to be at home. This inspired David to form a group with his sons.

In July 2008 The Akins signed with Crossroads Records. They are two time "Horizon Group of the Year" nominees by Singing News Magazine, and have received multiple nominations at the Inspirational Country Music Awards of the Christian Country Music Association including, "Entertainer of the Year," "Vocal Group of the Year," and "Christian Country Song of the Year."

Their 2017 album release, "Eyes On The Road" features the new single and music video, "Dying To Be With You".

== Members ==
- David Akin- Piano, Acoustic Guitar, Vocals
- Dave Akin- Bass Guitar
- Nick Akin- Acoustic Guitar, Drums, Vocals
- Eli Akin - Electric Guitar, Acoustic Guitar, Mandolin, Sax, Vocals

== Discography ==
- 2008: Good Tired
- 2009: The Akins
- 2010: The Akins - Live In Concert (DVD / 2 CD combo)
- 2012: The Akins - Based On A True Story
- 2014: The Akins - Vintage
- 2017: Akins - Eyes On The Road

=== Popular Singles ===
- I Want My Stage To Be An Altar
- What If God Says No
- Kneel
- Joyful, Joyful, We Adore Thee
- Dying To Be With You

== Awards ==
- 2010 "Horizon Group of the Year" Nominee.
