= Cheneta Jones =

American musician

- Born: February 8, 1985 (age 40); St. Louis, Missouri
- Genres: urban contemporary gospel
- Occupation(s): Singer, songwriter
- Instrument(s): vocals, singer-songwriter
- Years active: 2012–present
- Labels: Habakkuk
- Website: chenetajones.com

Cheneta Jones (born February 8, 1985) is an American urban contemporary gospel artist and musician. She started her music career, in 2012, with the release of the studio album, Transformed, by Habakkuk Music, and this charted on two Billboard charts Top Gospel Albums and the Heatseekers Albums chart.

== Early life ==
Jones was born on February 8, 1985, as Cheneta Jones in St. Louis, Missouri. She started into music, when she was sixteen years old as a background vocalist for Tye Tribbett. Jones was at one time in an R&B group, yet she left to further her ministry in the church, becoming an urban contemporary gospel artist.

== Music career ==
Her music recording career commenced in 2012, when she released, a studio album, with Habakkuk Music, Transformed, on May 22, 2012. This earned her a Stellar Award nomination, for Best New Artist. The album was her breakthrough release upon the Billboard magazine charts, where it placed at No. 13 on the Top Gospel Albums and at No. 17 on the Heatseekers Albums. Her song, "Get There", charted at No. 29 on the Gospel Songs chart. She now has a single out, "It's You (A Love Song)," featuring fellow gospel singer Zacardi Cortez.

== Discography ==
Studio albums

List of studio albums, with selected chart positions
Title	Album details	Peak chart positions	
Title	Album details	US Gos	US Heat
Transformed	Released: May 22, 2012; Label: Habakkuk; CD, digital download	13	17
