= Luther Magby =

Luther Martin Magby
- Born: June 5, 1896; South Carolina, U.S.
- Died: November 10, 1966 (aged 70); Hartley County, Texas, U.S.
- Occupation: Gospel singer
- Years active: 1927

Luther Martin Magby (June 5, 1896 – November 10, 1966) was an American gospel singer who recorded two songs for Columbia Records in Atlanta, Georgia on November 11, 1927. He both sang and accompanied himself on harmonium and tambourine.

He and his wife Mamie were born in South Carolina. At the time of the 1920 census, they and their one-year-old son Luther C. were living on a farm in Greenville County, South Carolina. Luther's occupation was recorded as "Farmer, General Farm."

== Death ==
He is recorded as having died in Hartley County, Texas; although his residence at the time is recorded as Dalhart, Texas, which is in Dallam County.

In 2002, someone by the name of "Luther Magby" was performing in gospel shows at state fairs. The surname is uncommon, and this may have been his son, Luther C.

== Discography ==
- "Jesus Is Getting Us Ready for That Great Day" / "Blessed Are the Poor in Spirit" 10" 78rpm single Columbia 14278-D
