= Zacardi Cortez =

- Born: Zacardi Renye Louis Cortez; September 17, 1985 (age 41); Houston, Texas
- Genres: Christian R&B, gospel, traditional black gospel, urban contemporary gospel, contemporary R&B
- Occupations: Singer, songwriter
- Instruments: Vocals, singer-songwriter
- Years active: 2012–present
- Labels: Blacksmoke, WorldWide
- Website: zacardicortez.com

Zacardi Renye Louis Cortez (born September 17, 1985) is an American gospel musician and Christian artist. He started his music career, in 2012, with the release of The Introduction by Blacksmoke Records. His second album, REloaded, was released by WorldWide Records in 2014. Both albums charted on the Billboard magazine Gospel Albums chart. His first release was more successful with chartings on The Billboard 200, Independent Albums, and R&B Albums charts.

== Early life ==
Cortez was born in Houston, Texas, on September 17, 1985, as Zacardi Renye Louis Cortez. His spiritual and music mentor, John P. Kee, was an influence upon his life, while they were touring together, and Kee even had Cortez featured on his album in 2005, Live at the Fellowship. After this, Cortez joined in James Fortune's band FIYA for a guest spot on The Transformation that was released in 2007.

== Music career ==
His music career got started in 2012, with the release of The Introduction by Blacksmoke Records on May 22, 2012. This was his breakthrough release upon the Billboard magazine charts, with it placing on The Billboard 200 at No. 73, Gospel Albums at No. 2, Independent Albums at No. 16, and R&B Albums at No. 8. He released, REloaded, with WorldWide Records in 2014, yet this only charted on the Gospel Albums at No. 10. He performs on the single, "It's You (A Love Song)," which was released by Cheneta Jones.

== Discography ==
List of studio albums, with selected chart positions
Title	Album details	Peak chart positions			
Title	Album details	US	US Gos	US Indie	US R&B
The Introduction	Released: May 22, 2012; Label: Blacksmoke; CD, digital download	73	2	16	8
REloaded	Released: 2014; Label: WorldWide; CD, digital download	—	10	—	—

== Singles ==
Title	Year	Peak chart positions	Album
Title	Year	US Gos	Album
"You Don't Know"	2019	—	Non-album singles
Work It Out for Me	2025	16	Non-album singles
