= Nehemiah Hunter Brown =

Nehemiah Brown
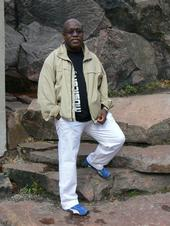
- Rock Church, Helsinki, Finland

Background information
- Also known as: Mr. Brown, N.H. Brown, Nehemiah Hunter Brown
- Born: January 27, 1951 (age 75)
- Origin: Charlottesville, Virginia
- Genre: Gospel
- Occupations: Singer, Pianist, Director
- Instruments: Vocal, Piano
- Years active: 1957-Present
- Label: Independent

Nehemiah Brown (born January 27, 1951, in Charlottesville, Virginia) is an American gospel music singer, songwriter, arranger, professional musician, teacher, vocal coach and choral director.

== Musical career ==
Nehemiah Brown performed for Pope John-Paul II in the Sala Nervi at the Vatican and in the Olympic Stadium in Rome and at the first appearance of Pope Benedetto XVI outside of Vatican City in Bari, Italy; He has performed for "Children in Crisis" the charity organization of Sarah Ferguson, the Duchess of York; and at Pitti Immagine, the annual fashion Event in Florence, Italy, for which he wrote, " Save the Children". Mr. Brown directed the 100 elements of The Millennium Voices in the 2000 New Year's Eve Concert at the Parco Parterre, Florence, Italy. He is director and co-founder of the Florence Gospel Choir School in florence Italy. In 2001, The Florence Gospel Choir was featured at the Annual Choir Conference at the University of Porto in Porto, Portugal.

From August 2001 to January 2002, Mr. Brown together with Davide Zachariah, of the Assn Il Varco held six month gospel music workshops, in the Sollicciano Prison Complex, Florence Italy and the Women's Security Complex, Empoli, Italy. The workshops produced both a male and female vocal groups. The experiences culminated with joint concerts and singular concerts inside and outside of each complex.

In 1996, Mr. Brown co-founded with Eusebio De Cristofaro, the Florence Gospel Choir School, Italy's first Gospel Music School for the spread of authentic American music and music of the African American music tradition, specifically, Gospel. He performs nationally and internationally in churches, schools, in piazzas and theatres, on radio and on television. He has coordinated and collaborated on several recording projects which include a CD with the Coro San Leonardo, directed by Claudio Gnarini of Santo Stefano di Magra. He was given "honorary citizenship" in June of the year 2000 in Santo Stefano di Magra. He was consultant for the CD, "All Things Are Possible" with Joyful Gospel Ensemble of Livorno in November 2003. Since 2004 he has been director of the SeaSide Gospel Choir, formerly known as the Coro Filarmonica G. Verdi. In 2005, he performed in Piazza San Marco with Carlo Fumagalli and the Blues Brothers Band of Milano, directing a choir of 50 voices. He founded the Faith Gospel Choir of Carpi(MO), Italy in June 2005, with whom he performed with La Banda Cittidina di Carpi (MO) and the Filarmonica Cittadina G. Andreoli at their Annual Christmas Concert December 2008. Also in 2008, Mr. Brown performed with the Gospel Tree and the annual Christmas concert at the Teatro Orione in Rome with Maestro Maestro Catello Milo and his Orchestra.

Mr. Brown devoted more than 15 years to music education in Italy, teaching in the Italian Public School system at the Elementary, Middle School and High School levels and at the International School of Florence. In 2003, he began a collaboration with Laura Amati and the Association Steps, teaching at the annual, Musicando, Meeting dei Giovani held in Riccione, Italia. He held a seminar at the Annual Intl. Meeting, Rimini directing a choir of 100 plus voices, in which the audience of 5000 plus enthusiastically created a living Gospel train.

He began collaborating with Isabella Guidotti and Pierpaolo Marini of the Association Batukada Luciani, working for several years with students from Ascoli Piceno. Having taught African American Vocal Technique and performing together for several years, he co-founded "The Precious Gospel Singers" of Pescara, with mezzo-soprano, Giulia Martella in 2003. They have been featured in numerous concerts as a duo and with the Precious Gospel Singers with critical acclaim. They have worked for three years with the Pescara High School and Middle school students in a 3-month October - December Vocal Music experience culminating with a concert in favor of Relief for Children in Africa.

He was director for the Markette Gospel Choir, featured vocalist, pianist and Dancer on the Italian variety show Markette conducted by Piero Chiambretti. It aired every Tuesday, Wednesday, Thursday and Saturday on Italian television station La7.Nehemiah Brown Markette Mr. Brown's composition, "Time to Heal" was among many songs used in the Obama presidential campaign. He released the CD All my Love in June 2008 with the Celebration Gospel Choir. He performed and was interviewed, with elements of the Celebration Gospel Choir on November 5, 2008, the day after the historic election of Barack Obama as the 44th president of the United States of America, on the Italian version of the Today Show called Uno Mattino. The show was seen by millions of viewers.

Mr. Brown directed the Celebration Gospel Choir in the "River to River", gospel concert on the Arno River. The concert, remembering the voyage of many slaves over the rivers and oceans to work in captivity and build the fortunes of the new Americas and the grand history of this great Florentine river, was an ante-prima of the annual Festa di San Giovanni Battista, the Patron Saint of Florence, Italy.

Following its historic performance on the Arno river in Florence, Italy sponsored by the Canottiere Firenze (Rowing Club of Florence) president, Massimo Cavallina. The Florence Gospel Choir will be performing in Stockholm, Sweden in August 2009 with a brief tour in Budapest, Hungary in the fall. While continuing an almost 10 year schedule of Gospel Music Workshops that began at St. Augustine's Anglican Church then with Christ the King Anglican Church in Frankfurt, Germany, in 2011 he founded with Christine Melcher, The Rhine Main Community Inspirational Choir. The name was later shortened to the Rhine Main Community Choir with Christine Melcher responsible for Coordination/Public Relations, Eusebio De Cristofaro, Artistic Direction and Musical Direction by Nehemiah H. Brown. In May 2013, Mr. Brown and The Celebration Gospel Choir, a mass choir under his direction, combined with seven other Italian choir to perform, Maestro Detto Mariano's "Eccoci", an original composition written by Maestro Mariano for the Jubilee at the Vatican. Mr. Brown was soloist performing it in September 2014. It was scheduled to be performed when Pope Francesco makes his formal visit to Florence in late 2015. Mr. Brown will be performing on July 3, 2015. for the Ambassador to the United Nations' Annual Independence Day Celebration, held at his residence in Rome, Italy. He is currently working on new compositions and a new project with the Filarmonica of Mirandola to be performed at Christmas 2015. Mr. Brown was ordained by the late, Rev. Charles H. Brown and licensed to preach by the Late Bishop Levy Willis in 1980. In September 2014, he was appointed as Senior Pastor of the Florence Gospel Fellowship International, Florence Italy. Under Rev. Brown's leadership, The Florence Gospel Choir School and the Florence Gospel Fellowship International have joined in a joint venture with the Methodist Church to present their first Artist in Residence Program in June 2015.

=== Early years ===
Born in Charlottesville, Virginia (USA) singer, pianist, composer, arranger, choral director and voice teacher, Brown began singing at Holy Temple Church of God in Christ, the church where his father, the late Rev. Charles Hunter Brown was pastor. He was "...practically born" in church according to his mother, Mrs. Angie Brown, mother of his other 11 siblings. He sang his first solo at six years old, The Lord's Prayer, and began piano lessons at eleven, with the late Victoria Perkins. His most profound musical mentor was Sylvester Walton, a graduate student from the University of Virginia, who directed the Gospel choir at his father's church. His first official gospel performance piece was James Cleveland's, "Joy of My Salvation".

In Charlottesville, he directed, on occasion, The Lane High School Choir, The Trinity Episcopal Church Youth Choir, The Pilgrim Baptist Church Youth Choir, The First Baptist Church Gospel Choir, The HTYC of the Church of God in Christ. He founded The Interdenominational Gospel Choir (renamed the Dimensions of Gospel), co-founder and founding director of The Black Voices of The University Of Virginia. Mr. Brown also founded the Genesis Gospel Choir at Smith College in Northampton, Massachusetts. He was accepted at Berklee School of Music in Boston, Massachusetts However, he decided to study African American vocal technique with noted author, ethnomusicologist, Professor Horace Clarence Boyer (editor of the Episcopal, African American Service Hymnal), at the University of Massachusetts.

He was mentored by his father, Rev. Charles H. Brown, his sister, Mrs. Angie B. Jefferson, Dean William A. Elwood, UVa, the Dean Charles Vandersee, UVa., Professors of English and Thomas W. Lamb, MD., former professor of physiology at the University of Virginia and Prof. Horace C. Boyer, UMass, Amherst.

Thanks to the prayers, encouragement and support from the Brown family, churches, choirs and his longtime friend, Neil S. Hunt, who encouraged him to return to college studies and to study abroad attending the California State University and the Università Degli Studi di Firenze. Mr. Brown continues to share his African American heritage, culture and faith around the world.

== Awards ==
- At 14 years old - University of Virginia - Program for Gifted Students
- Inducted into the International Thespian Society
- Scholarship for attendance at the University of Virginia
- Altrusa Club, Charlottesville, Virginia for the original composition, "Senior Citizen"
- Scholarship for attendance at National University, San Diego, California
- Scholarship for attendance at San Francisco State University, SF, California
- Honorary Citizenship awarded in Santo Stefano di Magra, (SP), Italy - 2000
- Numerous musical awards in USA, Italia, Germany, Switzerland, Portugal, The Netherlands, Finland, France
- Numerous awards from the International Lions Clubs, Rotary Clubs, Frecce Tre Colori

== Broadcasting career ==
Trained, initially by his brother, John M. Brown, Nehemiah began his broadcasting career as an on-air radio personality and Program director at CGC - FM, one of the US's first full-time gospel music stations on Cox Cable network. Around 1976–1979 he re-located to Oakland California, and attended Love Center Church, pastored by Walter Hawkins, and he also managed the historic Cathedral Bldg. in downtown, Oakland, California.

In 1980, he returned to Charlottesville, Virginia, and CGC-FM, resuming his position as program director and training other young aspirant DJs. From 1982 to 1985, he worked as announcer and director of religious programming for the God Is Alive radio program on XHRM, a border station serving San Diego County and Baja California. Mr. Brown, concurrently, began as a local sales representative proceeding to sales manager and national sales executive, serving agencies in San Diego, Los Angeles, San Francisco, Chicago and New York. Not only was he successful in attracting new clients, the Arbitron ratings for his radio shift from 6 am to 2 pm were the highest in the market. In December, Nehemiah, along with his brother John and colleague Eusebio De Cristofaro, returned to the radio airwaves in Florence, Italy, with a gospel music and information show called Shout Hallelujah, over NOVARADIO 101.5 FM.

== Education ==
Brown studied Popular and Jazz Harmony, and music theory at the University of Virginia. He studied African American Vocal Technique at the University of Massachusetts Amherst, where he also participated as singer and pianist in the Voices of New Africa House Choir founded by Max Roach, directed by Boyer. In San Diego, California, he studied piano and voice with the renowned vocal coach Martin Grusin, cousin of jazz pianist, Dave Grusin.

Brown did intensive Italian-language studies at the City College of San Francisco. He received an Italian Studies (Language and Literature) degree at San Francisco State University he concurrently attended the L'Università Degli Studi di Firenze, Florence, Italy.

Besides founding the Black Voices of the University of Virginia, Genesis at Smith College, the Dimensions of Gospel, Charlottesville, Virginia Mr. Brown founded the New Voices of Joy at St. James Episcopal Church, Florence, Italy. He and his groups have performed in the United States and Europe in concerts with such gospel greats as Edwin and Walter Hawkins, Andrae Crouch, Shirley Caesar and also opening for Ron Kenoly on his first visit to Italy. In December 2011- January 2012, he toured with the Faith Gospel Choir in San Francisco, California. culminating with a concert sponsored by the Leonardo da Vinci Society of San Francisco, presenting selections from their CD, "The Long Road To Freedom", featuring internationally known musicians from Modena and guest soloist, Sherry Sinkler Wright. The CD canfound on iTunes and CD Baby.

== Selected discography ==
- It's All Right - Dimensions of Gospel
- Gospel Jubilee Festival - Gospel Explosion 2000
- Praise Him con Il Coro San Leonardo - 2001
- All Things Are Possible con il Joyful Gospel Ensemble - 2003
- Church Lady - 2008
- All My Love con The Celebration Gospel Choir - 2008
