= Voz da Verdade =

Brazilian contemporary Christian band

- Origin: Santo André, São Paulo, Brazil
- Genres: Christian rock; Gospel; CCM
- Years active: 1978–present
- Labels: Independent; Califórnia Discos
- Members: Carlos A. Moysés; Samuel Moysés; Liliane Zanirato Moysés; Cristiane Moysés; Elizabeth Moisés; Alberto Cufone; Evaristo Fernandes; Ibsen Batista; André Nalesso
- Past members: Lílian Moisés; Lydia Moisés; José Luiz Moisés; Rita de Cássia Moisés; Sara Moisés; Célia Moisés; Isa Moysés; Fued Moysés; Nelson Zanirato; Leandro Zanirato; Luciano Zanirato; André Paolilo
- Website: Official Site (in Portuguese)

Voz da Verdade (in English, Voice of Truth) is a Brazilian contemporary Christian band. It was founded in 1978. The group is part of Ministry of the Voice of Truth (Portuguese: Ministério Voz da Verdade), a religious institution. Voz is one of the most active religious bands in Brazil, with a 47-year career and has sold over five million units among LPs, CDs and DVDs.

The band became known through songs such as "4ª Dimensão", "Além do Rio Azul", "Lute", "Sou um Milagre", "Pra Quê?", "Projeto no Deserto" and "O Escudo", the biggest hit of the band. They are recognized for their diversity of influences and styles, including Rock, Pop, Jazz, Caribbean, Hip Hop, Country and Symphonic Metal. They were nominated for the Talent Trophy and the Promises Trophy.

== History ==
The band began in 1973, Carlos A. Moyses and José Luiz devised the concept, playing at home and churches. They began to be asked to perform at evangelistic events. In 1978, with the encouragement of their grandmother Concheta, they recorded the band's first LP, Quem é o Caminho?, which was released in Santo André. At that time, still called A Voz da Verdade, the band issued its first single, "Jesus Vive", a solo anthem written by Elizabeth Moisés, sister of Carlos and José Luiz.

In 1979 the second LP, Consumado (reissued with another booklet in 1980) came and in 1981 the third LP Linda Manhã (containing the hits "Para Nunca Mais Chorar" and "Ele Virá") was released. Moysés became the leader while his father Fued Moysés, the minister's pastor, ministered at their concerts and presentations.

As time passed, the band grew, in the 80's, adding Jurandir, Márcia, Dayse, Liliani and Rita (vocalists). In 1983 Evaristo Fernandes, then twelve years old, joined. André L. Paolilo was the band's first bass player. In mid-1985 and 1986, he presented symptoms of PAF (a type of paramyloidosis, a hereditary degenerative disease). He died in 1987. Ibsen Batista became the bass player, taking over from Paulo Grégio who, in turn became the guitar played. In 1987, the album Sangue Cor Púrpura was released, responsible for "Sangue Cor Púrpura", "Deus" and "Liberdade."

In 1988, another title was released, LP Além do Rio Azul, containing an eponymous single, "Além do Rio Azul".

From 1990, with the LP Um Grito de Liberdade, Voz da Verdade began to release their records in live and independent shows. The first one was in Ibirapuera Gymnasium in 1991, and annually thereafter.

In 1992, Jurandir, Márcia and Dayse left the band.

In 1994, Samuel Moysés, son of Carlos Moysés, entered the group as backing vocal. At the time called the "Golden Age of Gospel Music", singles included "A Ilha", "Sete Horas da Manhã", "Solidão Nunca Mais", "Imagem de Deus", "Não é Tarde Demais", "Nas Asas do Vento", "Desejo de Vida", "Lute", "Terra do Pão", "Dono do Mundo" and "Majestade".

On the 1997 album, Coração Valente, Samuel made his first solo vocal, singing "Porto Desejado", also becoming the guitarist.

In 1999, the band grew, adding vocalist Lydia Moisés singing "Cache" next to her father, and Lílian Moisés singing "Impossível" with her grandmother Isa, on the album O Espelho, and the subsequent From the Voice of Truth albums.

In 2000, the band released a collection entitled Best Moments. In that same year Deus Dormiu lá em Casa was released, in which Daniel played drums on the track "Vale da Decisão". In 2001, the live version of the album was recorded, making the band one of the first to launch a DVD show. The following year, drummer Luciano Zanirato, left the group because of a change of city. On Project in the Desert, the drummer was Daniel, son of Carlos. The musicality of the Voz da Verdade undergoes some changes under the influence of Samuel and Daniel. In 2002, Sara Moisés, daughter of José Luiz e Rita, joined as backing vocal and singing harmony on "Debaixo das Asas", next to her cousin Samuel.

In 2003 the collection The Three First was released, presenting rerecorded tracks from the first three albums (Quem É O Caminho?, Consumado and Linda Manhã). Also released was the album O Melhor de Deus Está por Vir, offering the band's biggest hit, "O Escudo".

In 2004, before beginning the recording of Dreams, percussionist Leandro Zanirato died due to a heart attack. Isa Moyses, wife of Pr. Fued Moysés (leader of the group), left the group to take care of her husband.

In 2005, Pastor Fued died and the group began to be led by Carlos. The group released Ainda Estou Aqui.

In 2006, the group won Band of the Year together with Oficina G3 in the Talento Trophy contest. On June 9, the group won Gospel Band Top of the Century. At Easter, Lydia suffered a serious car crash. During her hospitalization, Carlos composed "Teatro da Vida" especially for her, who recorded the track for Filho de Leão.

In 2008, the group recorded their DVD 30 Anos - Ao Vivo commemorating the thirty years of existence at Estância Árvore da Vida. The album was released later that same year.

In 2009 Chuva de Sangue was released. The DVD version was recorded on December 19, at the Ibirapuera Gymnasium, after a few years recording at Via Funchal.

On August 4, 2010, vocalist Lílian Moisés, daughter of keyboardist Célia and the late bass player André Paolilo, received a liver transplant. The singer died after a cardiac arrest while undergoing the surgery of withdrawal of the liver so that the organ was replaced. A few days later, on August 29, Nelson Zanirato, group's presenter died. The combined upsets ended the band's practice of annual releases.

In 2011 came Eu Acredito, their thirty-second album.

In 2013, a national conference was held to commemorate the band's 35 years. Evaristo Fernandes left the band to collaborate with the Church of the Truth in Sorocaba.

In 2014, the band reduced its formation. Carlos remained, while José Luiz Moisés leaves the band along with his family. Luis and his daughters Lydia and Sara left to allow Luis to become pastor of two Congregations, one in Alphaville and another in Sorocaba. With the rearranged personnel the band released Herois, recorded live on August 22, 2015.

On November 26, 2016, pianist Evaristo Fernandes officially returned to the band.

In 2018, the band released Até Aqui Eu Cheguei. The repertoire was predominantly unpublished and included the English re-recording of the song "O Escudo" (The Shield) from the album O Melhor De Deus Está Por Vir(2003).

On May 24, 2019 Isa Moysés, a former member and founder of the Ministry, along with her husband Fued Moysés, died of cardiac arrest. Isa had been hospitalized for some time and died at 88 years old.

== Discography ==
=== Studio albums ===
- 1978: Quem É o Caminho? (Who Is The Way?)
- 1979: Consumado (Finished)
- 1981: Linda Manhã (Beautiful Morning)
- 1982: Livre (Free)
- 1983: Encontro Eterno (Eternal Encounter)
- 1984: Vem Buscar (Come Get)
- 1985: Facho de Luz (Light Beam)
- 1986: Cristo Reina (Christ Reign)
- 1987: Sangue Cor Púrpura (Purple Color Blood)
- 1988: Além do Rio Azul (Beyond the Blue River)
- 1989: Coração de Cera (Heart of Wax)
- 1990: Um Grito de Liberdade (A Cry of Freedom)
- 1991: Magnífico (Magnificent)
- 1992: Imagem de Deus (Image of God)
- 1993: Não é Tarde Demais (It's Not Too Late)
- 1994: Desejo de Vida (Life's Desire)
- 1995: Os Anjos (The Angels)
- 1996: Majestade (Majesty)
- 1997: Coração Valente (Brave Heart)
- 1998: Quando Deus se Cala (When God is Silent)
- 1999: O Espelho (The Mirror)
- 2000: Deus Dormiu lá em Casa (God Slept There At Home)
- 2001: Projeto no Deserto (Project In The Desert)
- 2002: Somos mais que Vencedores (We Are More Than Winners)
- 2003: O Melhor de Deus Está por Vir (The Best of God is Coming)
- 2004: Sonhos (Dreams)
- 2005: Ainda Estou Aqui (I'm Still Here)
- 2006: Filho de Leão (Son of Lion)
- 2009: Chuva de Sangue (Blood Rain)
- 2011: Eu Acredito (I Believe)
- 2014: Heróis (Heroes)
- 2018: Até Aqui Eu Cheguei (So Far I Got Here)
- 2023: Quem Sou Eu? (Who Am I?)

=== Live ===
- 2008: 30 Anos (30 years - Live)

=== Special ===
- 1994: O Homem que Encontrou Jesus no Cinema (The Man Who Met Jesus at the Cinema)
- 2003: Os Três Primeiros (The First Three)
- 2007: Voz de Ouro (Golden Voice)

=== Compilations ===
- 2001: Melhores Momentos (Best Moments)

=== Brothers Music ===
- 2009: Triunfal (Triumphal)
- 2013: Asas da Liberdade (Freedom Wings)

=== Kandace ===
- 2000: A Serviço do Senhor (At the Service of the Lord)
- 2009: Decisão (Decision)

== Videography ==
=== In VHS ===
- 1991: Um Grito de Liberdade (Ao Vivo)
- 1992: Magnífico (Ao Vivo)
- 1993: Imagem de Deus (Ao Vivo)
- 1994: Não é Tarde Demais (Ao Vivo)
- 1995: Desejo de Vida (Ao Vivo)
- 1996: Os Anjos (Ao Vivo)
- 1997: Majestade (Ao Vivo)
- 1998: Coração Valente (Ao Vivo)
- 1999: Quando Deus se Cala (Ao Vivo)
- 2000: O Espelho (Ao Vivo)
- 2001: Deus Dormiu lá em Casa (Ao Vivo)
- 2002: Projeto no Deserto (Ao Vivo)
- 2003: Somos Mais que Vencedores
- 2004: O Melhor de Deus está por Vir (Ao Vivo)
- 2005: Sonhos (Ao Vivo)

=== Re-released on DVD ===
- 2006: Coração Valente - Ao Vivo (remastered)
- 2006: Quando Deus se Cala - Ao Vivo (remastered)
- 2006: O Espelho - Ao Vivo) (remastered)

=== In DVD ===
- 2001: Deus Dormiu lá em Casa (Ao Vivo)
- 2002: Projeto no Deserto (Ao Vivo)
- 2003: Somos Mais que Vencedores (Ao Vivo)
- 2004: O Melhor de Deus está por Vir (Ao Vivo)
- 2005: Sonhos (Ao Vivo)
- 2006: Ainda Estou Aqui (Ao Vivo)
- 2007: Filho de Leão (Ao Vivo)
- 2008: 30 Anos (Ao Vivo)
- 2009: Chuva de Sangue (Ao Vivo)
- 2012: Eu Acredito (Ao Vivo)
- 2015: Heróis (Ao Vivo)

== Members ==
- Carlos A. Moysés - Base Guitar and Vocal
- Samuel Moysés - Guitar Solo, Guitars and Vocal
- Liliani Zanirato Moysés - Vocals
- Elizabeth Moisés - Vocals
- Cristiane Moysés - Vocals
- Alberto Cufone - Vocals
- Daniel Moysés - Battery
- Ibsen Batista - Contrabass
- André Nalesso - Keyboards
- Evaristo Fernandes - Pianos

== TV Program ==
The group had a weekly TV program named for the band on Rede TV for years. In 2016, the program ended.

== Recognition ==
- Top Century Gospel Band
- Band of the Year - Talent Trophy 2006
