= Futrel =

- Genres: Gospel
- Years active: 1978-1998
- Labels: Light, Tribute
- Past members: Janice Davis; Theresa Day; Darlene Futrel; Donna Roberts; Evie Young-Nelson

Futrel is an American female gospel quartet. Characterized as a Christian version of En Vogue, their first album, Worth the Wait, was released through Light Records in 1989 and peaked at No. 19 on Billboard Gospel charts. In 1992, they were nominated for a Stellar Awards for Best New Artist. Their second album, Declarations, was produced by Ben Tankard, Andrew Gouche and Cedric Dent of Take 6 and was released through Tankard's Tribute Records on April 28, 1993.
