= Elder Charles D. Beck =

American gospel musician

Elder Charles Beck (ca. 1900–1972) was an American gospel musician and evangelist. A seminal figure in the formative years of modern African-American gospel music, he is responsible for an extensive recording discography, which included over 60 songs over the span of two decades. Beck's abilities as a pianist and trumpet player are praised as one of the best from the gospel genre. His work, both as an instrumentalist and live performer, however, was predominantly overshadowed by the career of Thomas A. Dorsey. Over time, nearly all of Beck's recordings have become more accessible through compilation albums.

== Biography ==
Beck was most likely born in Mobile, Alabama, sometime during 1900, although other sources list two other possible birthplaces. Despite his prolific presence and extensive recording experience, little is known about Beck's early life and work. His first verified recording session took place on December 16 and 18, 1930, for Okeh Records at the King Edward Hotel in Jackson, Mississippi. For the occasion, Beck accompanied popular singing preacher Elder Curry and his congregation on piano, including "Memphis Flu", a song about the 1918 flu pandemic. According to some music historians, including David Hatch and Stephen Milward, Beck's boogie-woogie-based playing style on the record anticipated the works of many rock and roll pianists. "He may have been the best sanctified pianist", wrote Anthony Heilbut, "his playing was more legato and improvisatory than the herky-jerky ragtime of Arizona Dranes".

During the 1930s, Beck became a proficient trumpet player. His recordings in the decade represent the formative years of modern African-American gospel music; indeed, Beck's work was preceded notably only by Thomas A. Dorsey, whose career overshadowed much of Beck's accomplishments. Following World War II, Beck capitalized on the proliferation of record labels, recording with several including Chart, Eagle, Gotham, and King. Many of his sermons dealt with dramatic and humorous accounts of the "wages of sin"; his most enduring songs include "There's a Dead Cat on the Line", "Jesus, I Love You", and "Winehead Willie Put That Bottle Down".

Beck was minister of the Church of God in Christ in Buffalo, New York, in the 1950s, but his talents as a musician and preacher frequently took him across the United States throughout the decade. His services were broadcast weekly on a network of more than 30 radio stations. State University of New York professor William H. Tallmadge recorded Beck and his congregation at his church on December 30 and 31, 1956, releasing the assortment of spirituals and "holiness shouting" on the album Urban Holiness Service in 1957; The Heavenly Gospel Singers of Buffalo also make a guest appearance. The album is the last known recording of Beck's musical career.

In 1960, Beck began missionary work in Ghana. He died there in 1972. Beck's work has been compiled on several compilation albums after his death, including Complete Recorded Works In Chronological Order 1930–1939.
