= Caturité =

- Municipality
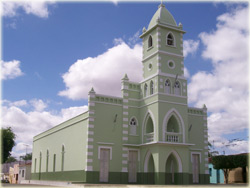

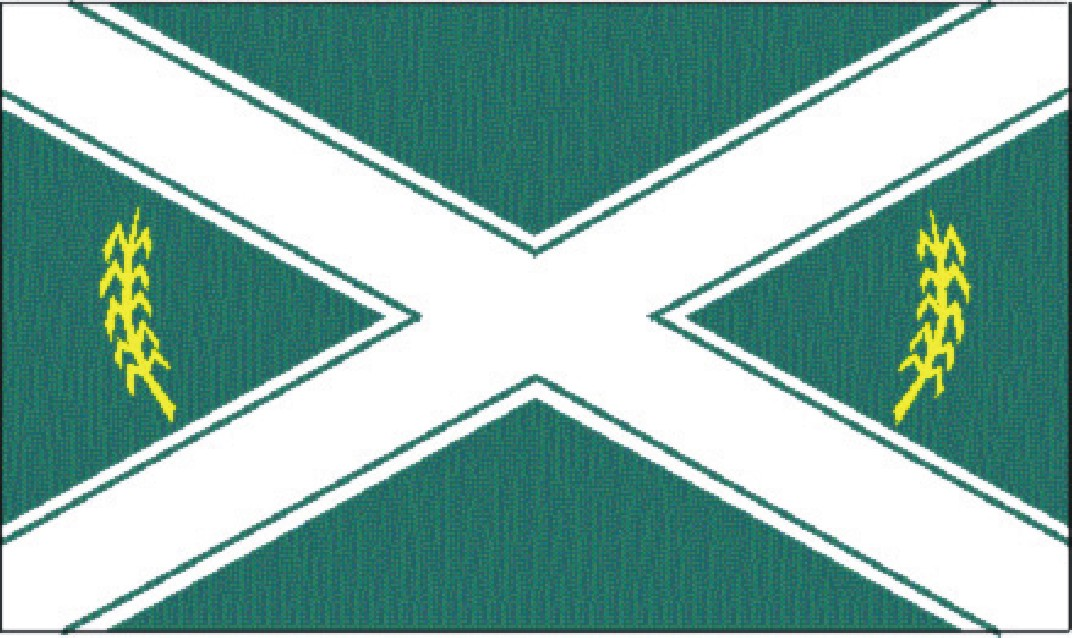
- Flag Coat of arms

- Location in Brazil
- Coordinates: 7°24′S 35°59′W
- Country: Brazil
- Region: Northeast
- State: Paraíba
- Mesoregion: Boborema

Population (2020)
  - Total: 4,875
- Time zone: UTC−3 (BRT)

Caturité (Central northeastern portuguese pronunciation: [kɐtuɾiˈtɛ]) is a municipality in the state of Paraíba in the Northeast Region of Brazil.

== See also ==
- List of municipalities in Paraíba
