= Mercy River Boys =

- Genres: Christian country, southern gospel, progressive southern gospel
- Years active: 1979–1985
- Label: Canaan

The Mercy River Boys were an American Christian country music band who performed from 1979 to 1985 after the Singing Christians dissolved. They were nominated for a Grammy Award for their first album, Breakout (Canaan Records, 1979). The album was also a finalist for the Gospel Music Association's Dove Award for Album of the Year, 1979–80, and won a Dove Award for backliner notes, written by Merlin Littlefield.

The group performed extensively in the United States and had multiple hits on Christian music radio. The band is also featured on the Canaan Recording Artists Christmas album and on a live recording from the Kerrville Folk Festival, recorded in Kerrville, Texas.

The Mercy River Boys were created, in part, to challenge the status quo of the Christian radio market. Don Cusic (Billboard Magazine, Vol. 90, No 31) credits Canaan Records for creating a band to cross over into country music, improving "what is essentially a good product (gospel) and made it become commercially viable." The eight original members of the band and the record executives at Canaan Records wanted to create a sound that would bridge the gap between country radio and more traditional southern gospel markets. The result was the creation of a new genre, Christian country music; country lyrics with a positive moral message.

The Mercy River Boys were a hit in both radio markets and performed in both country and gospel venues and music festivals for many years. Terry Bradshaw, former NFL quarterback and TV personality, listed the Mercy River Boys as one of his favorite Christian country bands because of their crossover appeal.

The Mercy River Boys toured for over five years, sharing the stage with many country music performers including the Oak Ridge Boys, Barbara Mandrell, Louise Mandrell, Dolly Parton, Crystal Gayle, and Larry Gatlin. The Mercy River Boys became one of Canaan Records' most successful performing artists in 1979–80 when their Breakout album crossed over from Southern gospel into the country music radio market; the songs to cross over into country music radio included "You Needed Me", "Blow On Temptest", and the semi-biographical song "Flat Top Martin Guitar". The 1982 album In the Arms of My Best Friend was a complete crossover product with hit songs "Would They Love Him Down In Shreveport Today" and the title cut, "In the Arms of My Best Friend".

The final Mercy River Boys lineup from April 15, 1983, to January 7, 1985, featured Emory Atkins (bass guitar and vocals), Danny Hollis (acoustic guitar and lead vocals), Ronny Ricks (drums and lead vocals), and Chuck Long (electric guitar and vocals). They dropped the traditional quartet and band format, used by many southern gospel groups of the time, rebranding themselves as a band with each musician singing various lead and harmony vocals. In a visual perspective, this was the final departure from the southern gospel music stage. They performed their final concert in Oklahoma City in late October 1984. The band recorded a few final songs that winter, including their final song, 'You're So Good to Me.'

After the group disbanded, Emory Atkins, Ronny Ricks, and Danny Hollis formed the Christian music band Paradise. They recorded four albums together on Englewood Records from 1985 to 1991. Atkins moved to Nashville and built a twenty-four-track recording studio in the United Artist Tower on Music Row. He toured with Margaret Becker, Harvest, Ben Ketting, and several country music and CCM artists. Wayne Christian began a long and successful career in Texas politics, serving in the state legislature and on the Texas Railroad Commission. Gary Goss toured with Johnny Rodriguez for over three decades. Ronny Ricks toured with a variety of artists including White River and the Penny Gilley band.

In May 2016, several original members of The Mercy River Boys performed a reunion concert at the Texas State Republican Convention, in Dallas, Texas, in support of Wayne Christian. This is the last time any of original the members of the band have performed. A new book about the various members of the band is being published in June 2019, forty years after the band released its first album.

The final release of the Mercy River Boys came out on September 1, 2020. After thirty-six years of musical silence, a Greatest Hits LP was released on iTunes, Google Play, Amazon Music, YouTube Music and most music streaming services by Englewood Records. The release includes one new song recorded in 1985 by the final four band members, Emory Atkins, Danny Hollis, Chuck Long, and Ronny Ricks. The song is entitled, 'You're So Good to Me.' A final video was released in support of the new album.

== Texas Gospel Music Hall of Fame ==
In 2015, Wayne Christian, Emory Atkins, Danny Hollis, Ronny Ricks, Gary Goss, Chuck Long and all the band members of the Mercy River Boys were inducted into the Texas Gospel Music Hall of Fame.

== Controversy ==
Since the band broke up in December 1985, at least three other groups have adopted or used some variation of the name Mercy River Boys, without permission. Emory Atkins owns the trademark and name The Mercy River Boys, Inc, a legal entity in the State of Texas; however, several groups continue to record and perform using the name. The band members have not pursued legal action.

== Band members ==
=== Lineups ===
1979–1980	1980–1981	1981–1982
Danny B. Smith, tenor; Wayne Christian, lead; Danny Hollis – baritone, guitar; Rusty Oxford – bass; Gary Goss – piano; Emory Atkins – bass guitar; Kevin Bailey – electric guitar; Ronny Ricks – drums	Danny B. Smith, tenor; Wayne Christian, lead; Danny Hollis – baritone, guitar; Rusty Oxford – bass; Gary Goss – piano; Emory Atkins – bass guitar; Kevin Bailey – electric guitar; Chuck Long – electric guitar; Ronny Ricks – drums	Gary Goss – tenor, piano; Wayne Christian – lead; Danny Hollis – baritone, guitar; John Aultman – bass guitar; Ronny Ricks – drums
1982–1983	1983–1985
Gary Goss – tenor, piano; Wayne Christian – lead; Ronny Ricks – baritone, drums, occasional guitar; John Aultman – bass guitar	Ronny Ricks – lead, drums, occasional guitar; Danny Hollis – baritone, guitar; Emory Atkins – bass guitar; Chuck Long, guitar

== Discography ==
Year	Album	Label
1979	Breakout (Mercy River Boys)	Canaan Records
1979	Kerrville Folk Life Festival, 1979. (Mercy River Boys)	Kerrville Folk Festival
1981	A Canaan Country Christmas album, Oh Little Town of Bethlehem (Mercy River Boys)	Canaan Records
1982	Arms of my Best Friend (Mercy River Boys)	Canaan Records
1982	Canaan Classics, (Compilation Of Canaan Recording Artists)	Canaan Records
1983	Country Gospel Classics: A collection of gospel greats from the Canaan Record family	Canaan Records
1984	Grass Roots Gospel, (A compilation of Canaan Gospel Recording Artists)	Canaan Records
2003	The Early Years, Kerrville Folk Life Festival, Compilation, 1972-1981. (Mercy River Boys)	Kerrville Folk Festival
2020	The Mercy River Boys, Greatest Hits. (Mercy River Boys)	Englewood Records
