= David J. Porter (politician) =

American politician (born 1956)

David Jerome Porter
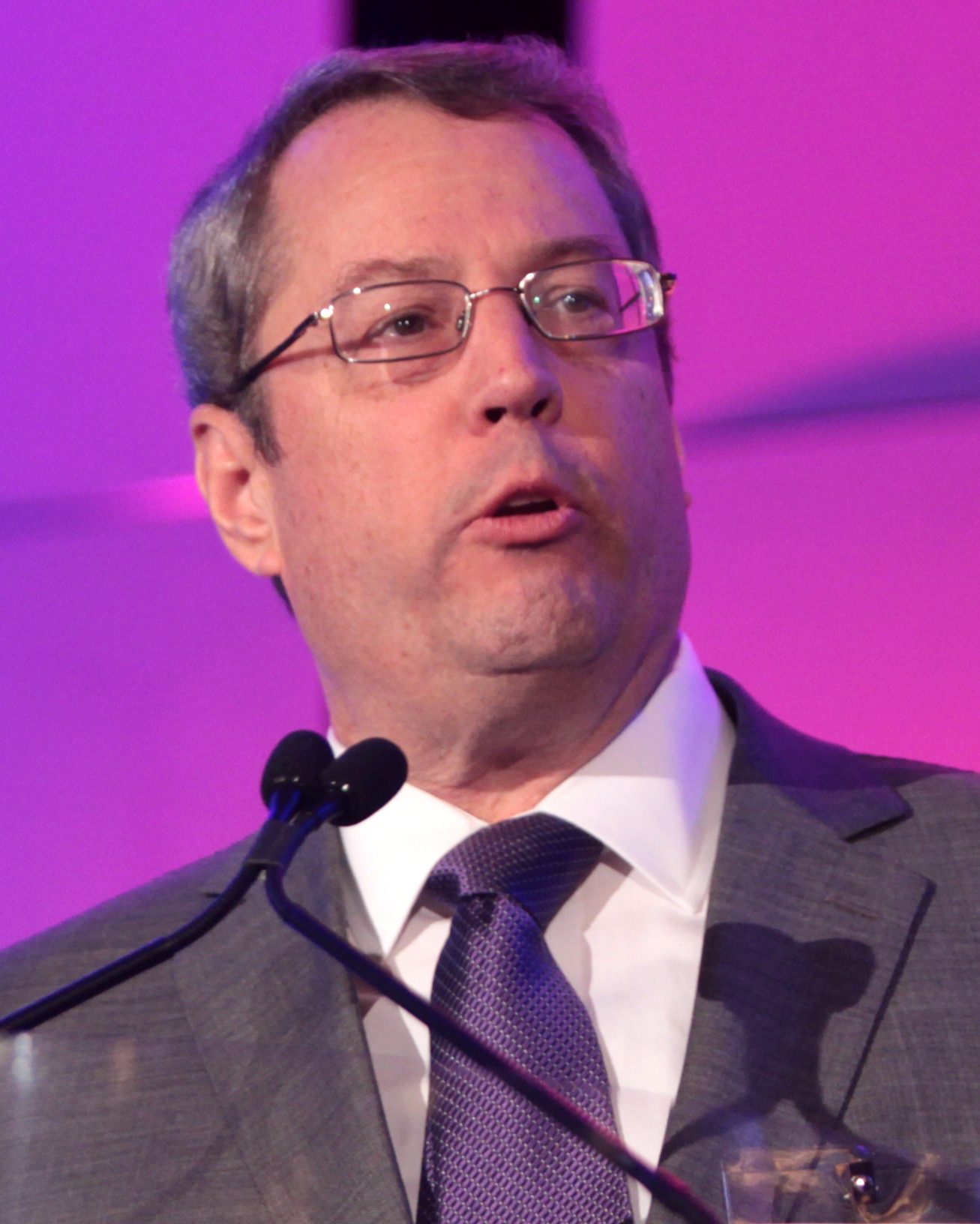
- Porter in 2015

Chair of the Railroad Commission of Texas
- In office January 5, 2015 – January 2, 2017
- Preceded by: Barry Smitherman
- Succeeded by: Wayne Christian

Railroad Commissioner of Texas
- In office January 5, 2011 – January 3, 2017
- Governor: Rick Perry; Greg Abbott
- Preceded by: Victor G. Carrillo
- Succeeded by: Wayne Christian

Personal details
- Born: April 21, 1956 (age 70) Fort Lewis, Washington, U.S.
- Party: Republican
- Spouse: Cheryl Jenkins (m. 1979)
- Children: 1
- Education: Harding University (BS)
- Occupation: Accountant

David Jerome Porter (born April 21, 1956) is an American politician and accountant who served as a member of the Texas Railroad Commission from 2011 to 2017. Formerly in a private CPA practice in Midland, Porter since relocated to Giddings.

Porter did not seek re-election to a second six-year term in the Republican primary election which took place on March 1, 2016.

== Background ==
Porter is a native of Fort Lewis, Washington, located near Olympia, where his parents resided while his father was in the United States Army. He graduated with honors in 1977 from the Church of Christ-affiliated Harding University in Searcy, Arkansas. He and his wife, the former Cheryl Jenkins, a dietitian, resided in Midland for more than twenty-five years prior to their relocation to Giddings, where in 2004 they had purchased rural property. Their daughter, Jennifer P. Brown, and her husband, Ryan, have three children.

Porter passed the CPA exam on his first attempt in November 1977. He became a Texas CPA in 1981, the same year that he moved to Midland. His CPA practice is concentrated on accounting and tax services to petroleum and natural gas producers, royalty owners, oil field service companies, and other small businesses and individuals. He has also assisted numerous Republican candidates and conservative organizations comply with campaign finance disclosure and tax compliance regulations.

From 1989-1991, Porter served on the elected Midland Hospital District Board. A political conservative, Porter was affiliated with William F. Buckley Jr.'s Young Americans for Freedom and the College Republicans while attending Harding. He has worked in various Republican campaigns at all levels, has been a delegate to county and state Republican conventions, and a precinct chairman in Midland and then Lee counties.

He served as a deacon at Fairmont Park Church of Christ in Midland and is now affiliated with the Giddings Church of Christ. He was an officer in the Midland Junior Chamber International and is a member of Junior Achievement, Toastmasters International, and the National Rifle Association of America. He is a member of the interest groups Citizens for Fiscal Responsibility, the Texas Land & Mineral Owners Association, the Farm and Ranch Freedom Alliance, and the American Livestock Breeds Conservancy. Professionally, he is affiliated with the Texas Society of CPAs and the American Institute of CPAs.

== 2010 election ==
In the Republican primary on March 2, 2010, Porter, with little previous political experience, unseated Railroad Commissioner Victor G. Carrillo, a former county judge of Taylor County who previously resided in Abilene. Carrillo was seeking his second full term on the commission, having originally been appointed by then Governor Rick Perry to fill a vacancy created by the resignation of Tony Garza of Brownsville, who became the United States Ambassador to Mexico.

Porter went on to comfortably win the general election held on November 2, 2010. He garnered 2,875,744 votes (59.4 percent) to 1,753,625 (36.2 percent) for the Democrat Jeff Weems, a Louisiana native and an oil and gas lawyer from Houston. Another 138,707 votes (2.9 percent) were cast for Libertarian Roger Gary. The Green Party nominee, Art Browning, received the remaining 72,143 votes (1.5 percent).

In 2016 it was claimed that Porter received significant campaign contributions from several oil and gas companies that the Railroad Commission regulates.

== Tenure in office ==
Porter is a member and second vice president of the Interstate Oil and Gas Compact Commission. From 2011 to 2014, he was a member of the Interstate Mining Compact Commission. When he joined the commission in 2011, Porter created a task force to establish a dialogue regarding drilling in the Eagle Ford Shale fields of South Texas. In 2013, Porter established the Texas Natural Gas Initiative. He was named "Man of the Year" by The Oil & Gas Year. He has been recognized by the Shale Oil & Gas Business Magazine and Unconventional Oil & Gas Magazine for his economic development policies.

As of 2017, Porter's colleagues on the Railroad Commission are Christi Craddick of Austin, formerly of Midland, and Ryan Sitton of Friendswood.

As of 2021, he owned an interest in a small oil & gas production company in Texas.

== Electoral history ==
Texas Railroad Commissioner Republican Primary Election, 2010
| Party | Candidate | Votes | % |
| Republican | David Porter | 733,746 | 60.73 |
| Republican | Victor Carrillo (inc.) | 474,409 | 39.27 |

Texas Railroad Commissioner Election, 2010
| Party | Candidate | Votes | % |
| Republican | David Porter | 2,880,765 | 59.41 |
| Democratic | Jeff Weems | 1,757,183 | 36.24 |
| Libertarian | Roger Gary | 138,978 | 2.87 |
| Green | Art Browning | 72,291 | 1.49 |

Political offices
| Preceded by Victor G. Carrillo | Texas Railroad Commissioner; 2011–2017 | Succeeded by Wayne Christian |
