= Lydia Moisés =

Lydia Moisés Lydia Nobile Matos Moisés
- Born: February 3, 1983 (age 43)
- Origin: Santo André, São Paulo, Brazil
- Genres: Gospel; Christian contemporary music
- Occupations: Singer-songwriter, musician
- Instruments: Vocals, piano
- Years active: 1999–present
- Labels: Sony Music Brasil; Independent
- Website: Official Site (in portuguese)

Lydia Moisés (born February 3, 1983, in São Paulo) is a Brazilian contemporary Christian music singer. She has 5 discs recorded, and a DVD. In addition, she is known to be a former member of the Voz da Verdade Band, where she remained for 15 years and achieved great projection in the genre of gospel.

== Biography ==
Born on February 3, 1983, she is the youngest daughter of Pr. José Luiz Moisés and Pra. Rita de Cassia Moisés.

In mid-1997, Lydia and her family moved to San Francisco, California, and began organizing evangelical cults in their own home, where there was an old piano. From there, his father bought a battery and a double bass for the whole family to perform some function in the service. Rebeca, the eldest daughter of the couple, on the street, Sara sitting on the drums, Pr. José Luiz on the guitar and Lydia on the piano, along with Pra. Rita sang gospel songs, and preached the word of God. In one of the cults Lydia began to sing, from there, in all the cults people asked her to praise, thus initiating, her musical ministry. When they returned from the US, her parents revealed that Lydia would join the Voz da Verdade ensemble. In 1999, she made her first appearance in the band, singing the band Escudo duetto with her father, on that year's album, O Espelho, making her voice known throughout the gospel medium. Recorded in various styles such as rock, pop, oriental and others, each year's release of Lydia Truth Voice improves her talent and reaches major projections in her musical career.

The Whistle register was present in almost all of their songs in the band, a factor that made it known, this being their mark in the history of the ensemble. In 2002, in the album Projeto no Deserto, Lydia stood out even more with the song O Verbo, that has clear influence in the soundtrack of the film / opera The Phantom of the Opera.

In 2005, she recorded her first solo album, Protected, with great sales success. In the same year she was awarded the Talent Trophy in the category "Feminine Revelation".

In April 2006, he suffered a serious car accident, in which he lost the sensitivity in his left arm.

In 2009, she married Rafael Nobile Matos, and recorded her second solo CD, entitled Desafio, music made by her cousin Ricardo Barbosa. The CD "Desafio", produced by José Luiz Moisés, has 11 unreleased tracks, all made in analogue and digital recording.

In April 2010, Lydia recorded her first solo DVD at the Assembly of God of Brás with the songs of her first two CDs. The DVD was attended by her parents Pr. José Luiz Moisés and Pra. Rita de Cassia Moisés, her uncle and leader of the Joint Voice of Truth, Carlos A. Moysés, Rebeca Nemer, who led a choir of deaf and dumb who played and sang a song through the signs and Pastor Marco Feliciano with the preaching. The DVD was released at the 2010 Christian Expo.

In 2011, Lydia Moisés enters the studio to record her third solo CD titled O Encontro, which was attended by her father José Luiz, her two older sisters, Rebeca and Sara Moisés and also the gospel singer Cassiane in music "The Hour of the Savior", originally released on the album "Magnificent" of the Ensemble Voice of Truth. The "O Encontro" CD was released for sales on September 10, 2011, reaching 10,000 copies sold in just two weeks.

In 2012, Lydia released Maestro's Heaven's CD with the production of maestro Ronny Barbosa, with 11 tracks, which was characterized by singer's change of style, which chose more congregational songs and the absence of Whistles.

In November 2012 the artist closed a distribution partnership with the record company Sony Music Brazil, relaunching the album Maestro do Céu by it.

On November 23, 2013, Lydia participated in the Raul Gil program, singing the song "Milagres Sobrenaturasis", from the album Maestro do Céu. In addition to being the juror of the painting "The Best Domestic Maid of Brazil", the artist received from the hands of Their parents, a gold record by the expressive sales of the DVD Lydia Moisés (Ao Vivo), released in 2010.

In 2014, Lydia detaches herself from the Voice of Truth with her family. In October of the same year, he released his new CD titled Vai tudo bem, being very well accepted by the evangelical public, having 11 tracks, counting on the production of conductor Ronny Barboza, maintaining the musicality of the previous album and the participation of Paulo Zuckini in the band "A Beira do Tanque".

On April 7, 2016, her first child, Matheus Moisés, was born as a result of her marriage to Rafael Nobile. In the same year, he participated in the CD I Can See the King, record recorded by his father, his mother and his two sisters, where she does solo in two songs.

== Voice ==
Lydia is considered one of the strongest voices in terms of power and vocal extension, mainly due to its powerful and sustained Whistle register treble, Bb6 and E6 in the song "Exaltai", G6 in "Esconderijo" A6 in "Eu Posso" and Eb6 in "O Verbo". It is considered a dramatic soprano, going from a D3 to a B6, possessing 3 octaves and 5 notes. It also has firm bass records like Eb3 and G#3.

== Discography ==
=== Studio albums ===
- 2005: Protegida (Protected)
- 2009: Desafio (Challenge)
- 2011: O Encontro (The Encounter)
- 2012: Maestro do Céu (Maestro of Heaven)
- 2014: Vai tudo Bem (Is all well)

=== Video albums ===
- 2010: Ao Vivo (Live)

== Participation in the Voz da Verdade and Família Moisés ==
=== Voz da Verdade (1999–2014) ===
Year	Album	Tracks	Composers
1999	O Espelho	Esconderijo	Carlos A. Moysés
2000	Deus Dormiu lá em Casa	Exaltai	Carlos A. Moysés/Samuel Moysés
2001	Projeto no Deserto	O Verbo	Carlos A. Moysés/Samuel Moysés
2002	Somos Mais que Vencedores	Ia Habib (Querido)	Rita de Cássia Moisés
2002	Somos Mais que Vencedores	Quantas Vezes	Carlos A. Moysés
2003	O Melhor de Deus Está por Vir	Posso	Carlos A. Moysés/Samuel Moysés
2003	O Melhor de Deus Está por Vir	Coração Puro	Carlos A. Moysés
2003	Os Três Primeiros	Ele Virá	Carlos A. Moysés
2004	Sonhos	Creia	Versão: Lydia Moisés
2004	Sonhos	Volte pra Vencer	José Luiz Moisés/Rita de Cássia Moisés
2005	Ainda Estou Aqui	Maktub (Está Escrito)	Lydia Moisés
2005	Ainda Estou Aqui	O Trono de Deus	José Luiz Moisés
2005	Ainda Estou Aqui	Estar em Ti	J.B Júnior
2006	Filho de Leão	Teatro da Vida Renova-me	Carlos A. Moysés Samuel Moysés
2008	30 Anos Ao Vivo	Além do Rio Azul	Carlos A. Moysés
2009	Chuva de Sangue	A Oferta	Carlos A. Moysés
2011	Eu Acredito	O Milagre Bateu em Minha Porta	Carlos A. Moysés

=== Família Moisés (2016) ===
Year	Album	Tracks	Composers
2016	Eu Posso Ver O Rei	Aprendi a Voar	José Luiz Moisés
2016	Eu Posso Ver O Rei	Emanuel	José Luiz Moisés
