= List of Christian vocal artists =

The following is a list of notable vocal Christian artists.

The Encyclopedia of Contemporary Christian Music (2002) defines CCM as "music that appeals to self-identified fans of contemporary Christian music on account of a perceived connection to what they regard as Christianity". Based on this definition, this list includes artists that work in the Christian music industry as well as artists in the general market.

Note: Because classifying music by genre can be arbitrary, these groupings are generalized and many artists appear on multiple lists.

- Acappella
- AVB (a.k.a. Acappella Vocal Band)
- David M. Bailey
- First Call
- 4Him
- Robert Galea
- The Imperials
- Russell Leonce
- Ladysmith Black Mambazo
- NewSong
- Sandi Patty
- Take 6

== See also ==
- Contemporary Christian music
- List of Christian bands and artists by genre
