= Men of Standard =

American gospel group

- Genres: Gospel music
- Years active: 1996–present
- Labels: Muscle Shoals (1996-2005); Columbia (2005-present)
- Members: Isaac Carree; Bryan Pierce; Lowell Pye
- Past members: Michael Bacon
- Website: MenOfStandardMusic.com

Men of Standard is an American gospel group.

== Musical career ==
The group spent the bulk of their tenure as signees to the Malaco Records subsidiary Muscle Shoals. Their album released on Columbia Records/Sony Gospel features production from Warryn Campbell as well as a guest appearance from rapper Heavy D and Kirk Franklin. They were also a featured act on the second leg on Kirk Franklin’s Hero tour.

== Group members ==
The current group is Bryan Pierce, Isaac Carree and Lowell Pye.

=== Lowell Pye ===
Lowell Curtis Pye, Sr. (born March 28, 1970 Detroit, Michigan) sang as a tenor in John P. Kee’s V.I.P choir. In 1991, Pye was featured as the lead in Kee’s "Jesus Is Real." Pye, who grew up in Detroit, Michigan sang in an adult gospel men’s quartet at the age of four. He is now a Praise & Worship leader at his church.

=== Bryan Pierce ===
Bryan Joseph Pierce was born in New Orleans, Louisiana on November 3, 1972 (age 53). He began preaching at the age of six. He was later licensed at the age of nine and ordained at the age of 19. Pierce is the former Youth Pastor at Greater St. Stephens in New Orleans, Louisiana. In 1996, Pierce relocated to Greensboro, NC where he served in full-time ministry as Evangelism Pastor at the Mount Zion Baptist Church.

In April 1999, Pierce accepted the call to Pastorship at Bethel Baptist Church in Kannapolis, North Carolina. He was installed in June 1999. Pierce is married to Minister Debra A. Pierce. They are the parents of three sons and one daughter, Bryan Jr., Brandon Joshua, Devin Ahmad and Bryana Janae.

In December 2012, Pierce accepted senior pastor position of the Mount Zion Baptist Church in Greensboro, North Carolina.

=== Isaac Carree ===
Isaac Carree (born April 28, 1973), grew up in North Carolina where his mother is Pastor Nancy Wilson of New Beginnings Community Outreach Church in Greensboro, North Carolina. Carree began singing solos by the age of 5. He later sang as a tenor in John P. Kee’s V.I.P choir. Upon leaving Kee’s choir, he kept a "day job" and later did road/touring stage plays where he met Pierce. He currently lives in Atlanta, Georgia and is now a Praise & Worship leader at his church. He has contributed his vocals to singer Michelle Williams’ solo debut album, Heart To Yours. Carree has sung on Kirk Franklin's albums and in his performances. He released his solo album, Uncommon Me in August 2011. He lives with his wife Dietra, son Isaac IV, and daughter Alaina. He also sang background for Faith Evans on the Bad Boy Family Reunion Tour.

== Former member ==
=== Michael Bacon ===
Former Men of Standard member Michael Bacon is from Dallas, Texas. He left the group amicably in 2005.

== Discography ==
=== Group albums ===
- Men of Standard (Muscle Shoals, 1996)
- Feels Like Rain (Muscle Shoals, 1999)
- Vol. III (Muscle Shoals, 2002)
- It's A New Day (Muscle Shoals, 2004)
- Surrounded (Columbia, 2006)
- Greatest Hits (Muscle Shoals, 2009)

=== Solo albums ===
==== Isaac Carree ====
- Uncommon Me (Sovereign Agency, 2011)
- Reset (Door 6 Ent., 2013)

=== Notable singles ===
- "Clean This House" (USA, 2013)
- "Winter" (Malaco, 1996)
- "In Your Will" (Malaco, 1999)
- "Count It All Joy" (Malaco, 2002)
- "Gotta Grip" (Malaco, 2002)
- "I Made It" (Malaco, 2004)
- "I Will" (Columbia, 2006)
- "Surrounded" (Columbia, 2006)

== Awards ==
| Year | Award-giving body | Award |
|---|---|---|
| 2000 | Stellar Awards | Group Duo of the Year for Feels Like Rain |
| 2000 | Stellar Awards | Contemporary Group/Duo of the Year for Feels Like Rain |
