= Patrick Love =

American gospel musician (born 1968)

- Born: Patrick Shevelle Love; July 23, 1968 (age 57); Charlotte, North Carolina, U.S.
- Genres: gospel
- Occupations: Singer, songwriter
- Instruments: vocals, singer-songwriter
- Years active: 1994–present
- Label: Crystal Rose

Patrick Shevelle Love (born July 23, 1968) is an American gospel musician. He started his music career with the release of Wait on the Lord, released in 1994, by Crystal Rose Records. His second album, The Vision, was released by Crystal Rose Records in 1998. Both albums charted on the Billboard magazine Gospel Albums charts.

== Early life ==
Love was born in Charlotte, North Carolina, as Patrick Shevelle Love. His father is a retired stevedore; his mother was a small business owner and early childhood educator. Patrick is a 1986 graduate of West Mecklenburg High School.

== Music career ==
Patrick's formal music career began in 1994, with inspiration from Donald Lawrence, who attended his church, Salem Baptist Church. Lawrence helped to foster Love's career by signing him, along with his choir, to the label that he co-owned, Crystal Rose Records. Lawrence helped to produce the two albums that Love released. The 1994 release of Wait on the Lord was Love's breakthrough release on the Billboard magazine Gospel Albums at No. 18. His second album, The Vision, was released on March 10, 1998, and it charted at No. 16 on the aforementioned chart.

== Discography ==
List of studio albums, with selected chart positions
Title	Album details	Peak chart positions
Title	Album details	US Gos
Wait on the Lord	Released: 1994; Label: Crystal Rose; CD, digital download	18
The Vision	Released: 1998; Label: Crystal Rose; CD, digital download	16
