= Isaac Carree =

- Born: Isaac Thompson Carree III; April 28, 1973 (age 53); Greensboro, North Carolina
- Origin: Atlanta, Georgia
- Genres: Gospel, traditional black gospel, urban contemporary gospel,
- Occupations: Singer, songwriter
- Instruments: Vocals, singer-songwriter
- Years active: 1996–present (with band); 2011–present (solo)
- Labels: Sovereign Agency, Door 6, Shanachie
- Member of: Men of Standard
- Website: www.isaaccarree.com

Isaac Thompson Carree III (born April 28, 1973) is an American gospel musician. He started his music career, in 1990, with the Gospel legend John P. Kee, yet his solo career commenced in 2011, with the release of Uncommon Me by Sovereign Agency. His second album, Reset, was released by Door 6 in 2013. Both albums charted on The Billboard 200 along with chartings on Gospel Albums and Independent Albums charts.

== Early life ==
Carree was born in Greensboro, North Carolina, on April 28, 1973, as Isaac Thompson Carree III, to his mother Pastor Nancy Wilson of New Beginnings Community Outreach Church in Greensboro, North Carolina, and father Isaac Thompson Carree, Jr.

== Music career ==
His music career got started in the early 1990s as a member of Pastor John P Kee's New Life Community Choir (NLCC), being featured on the song "Wave It Away." In 1995 Carree left the NLCC to begin work with the gospel music group Men of Standard, a group that has recorded five projects that charted on Billboard's Gospel Albums Chart; however, his solo career commenced in 2011, with the release of Uncommon Me by Sovereign Agency on August 23, 2011. This album was his breakthrough release on the Billboard magazine charts, with chartings on The Billboard 200 at No. 48, Gospel Albums at No. 1, and at the No. 5 position on the Independent Albums chart. Carree won a Stellar Award for his debut solo album. The subsequent album, Reset, released on May 25, 2013, by Door 6 Records. The album charted on all three of the aforementioned chart with the album placing at No. 41 on The Billboard 200, No. 1 on the Gospel Albums, and Independent Albums at No. 10.

== Personal life ==
Carree is married to Dietra, and they have a daughter Alexis Carree, son, Isaac Thompson Carree IV, and a daughter together, Alaina Monet Carree. They reside in Atlanta, Georgia.

== Discography ==
List of studio albums, with selected chart positions
Title	Album details	Peak chart positions		
Title	Album details	US	US Gos	US Indie
Uncommon Me	Released: August 23, 2011; Label: Sovereign Agency; CD, digital download	48	1	5
Reset	Released: June 25, 2013; Label: Door 6; CD, digital download	41	1	10
No Risk No Reward	Released: March 20, 2020; Label: Shanachie; CD, digital download			
