= Canaan Records =

American Christian record label

- Parent company: Word Entertainment revived
- Founded: 1965
- Founder: Marvin Norcross
- Defunct: 2009
- Distributor: Word Distribution
- Genre: Southern gospel
- Country of origin: United States
- Official website: www.worddistribution.com

Canaan Records is a Christian record label and is a subsidiary of Word Entertainment.

== History ==
The label was started in 1965, by Marvin Norcross, for the label's Southern gospel quartets. Their biggest artist to date is the Happy Goodman Family. After being absent from the southern gospel music industry for several years, Word Entertainment revived the Canaan Records label in 2007, placing Dave Clark as the General Manager of the label and announcing Canaan's relaunch on June 6, 2007. The first group to sign with the label after the relaunch was Southern gospel veteran group, The Hoppers. They released their first Canaan Records album, The Ride, on September 4, 2007.

Early labels were red with black print. Later, the label changed to black with a color logo and a distinctive vertical row of colored dots down the middle of the label. In the mid-1980s, the label changed to a full color label showing a desert town (presumably Canaan) at sunset, with colors fading from green to yellow to orange in the sky, and tones of brown for the sand. For the 2007 relaunch of Canaan Records, the logo was changed to display the word "Canaan" in a script-style font, with the word "RECORDS" below in a sans-serif font. The label name was surrounded on either side by arching curves, implying an oval shape around the words. In 2009, Curb Records (by then the owner of Word) again closed the doors on Canaan Records.

== Select Canaan artists ==
- Wendy Bagwell and the Sunliters
- The Happy Goodman Family (1965-1983)
- Rusty Goodman (1977-1985)
- Vestal Goodman
- Tanya Goodman Sykes
- The Inspirations
- Teddy Huffam and The Gems
- The Plainsmen Quartet
- The Florida Boys
- The Lefevres
- The Rebels
- The Couriers Quartet
- The Hemphills
- The Cathedrals
- The Rex Nelon Singers (later called The Nelons)
- Jimmie Davis
- The Singing Christians (1975-1979)
- The Hoppers (2007-2008)
- Kim Hopper (2008)
- Mike And Kelly Bowling (2008)
- The LeFevre Quartet (2008)
- Lewis Family
- The Talleys
- Mercy River Boys (1979-1984)

== See also ==
- List of record labels
