= Wayne Christian =

American politician (born 1950)

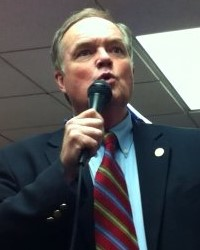
- Christian in 2011

Railroad Commissioner of Texas
- Incumbent
- Assumed office January 3, 2017
- Governor: Greg Abbott
- Preceded by: David J. Porter

Member of the Texas House of Representatives from the 9th district
- In office January 9, 2007 – January 8, 2013
- Preceded by: Roy Blake Jr.
- Succeeded by: Chris Paddie
- In office January 14, 1997 – January 11, 2005
- Preceded by: Jerry Johnson
- Succeeded by: Roy Blake Jr.

Personal details
- Born: Walter Wayne Christian; September 26, 1950 (age 76) Center, Texas, U.S.
- Party: Republican
- Spouse: Lisa Lemoine (m. 1975)
- Children: 3
- Education: Stephen F. Austin State University (BBA)
- Website: Office website Campaign website

Walter Wayne Christian (born September 26, 1950) is an American politician and financial planner who has served as a member of the Railroad Commission of Texas since 2017. A member of the Republican Party, Christian formerly served in the Texas House of Representatives for the 9th district, which included Jasper, Nacogdoches, Sabine, San Augustine, and Shelby counties in East Texas.

In June 2019, Christian was elected commission chairman by his two colleagues, fellow Republicans Christi Craddick and Ryan Sitton.

== Background ==
Walter Wayne Christian was born in Center but reared in nearby Tenaha. In 1975 he married the former Lisa Ruth Lemoine. The couple has three daughters: Liza, Lindsey, and Lauren.

In the 1970s, Wayne was the leader of a successful Southern gospel band, The Singing Christians. In 1979, Wayne and his bandmates created the Mercy River Boys. They were twice nominated for a Grammy Award by the National Academy Of Recording Arts and Sciences. Wayne Christian was inducted into the Texas Gospel Music Hall Of Fame in November 2015.

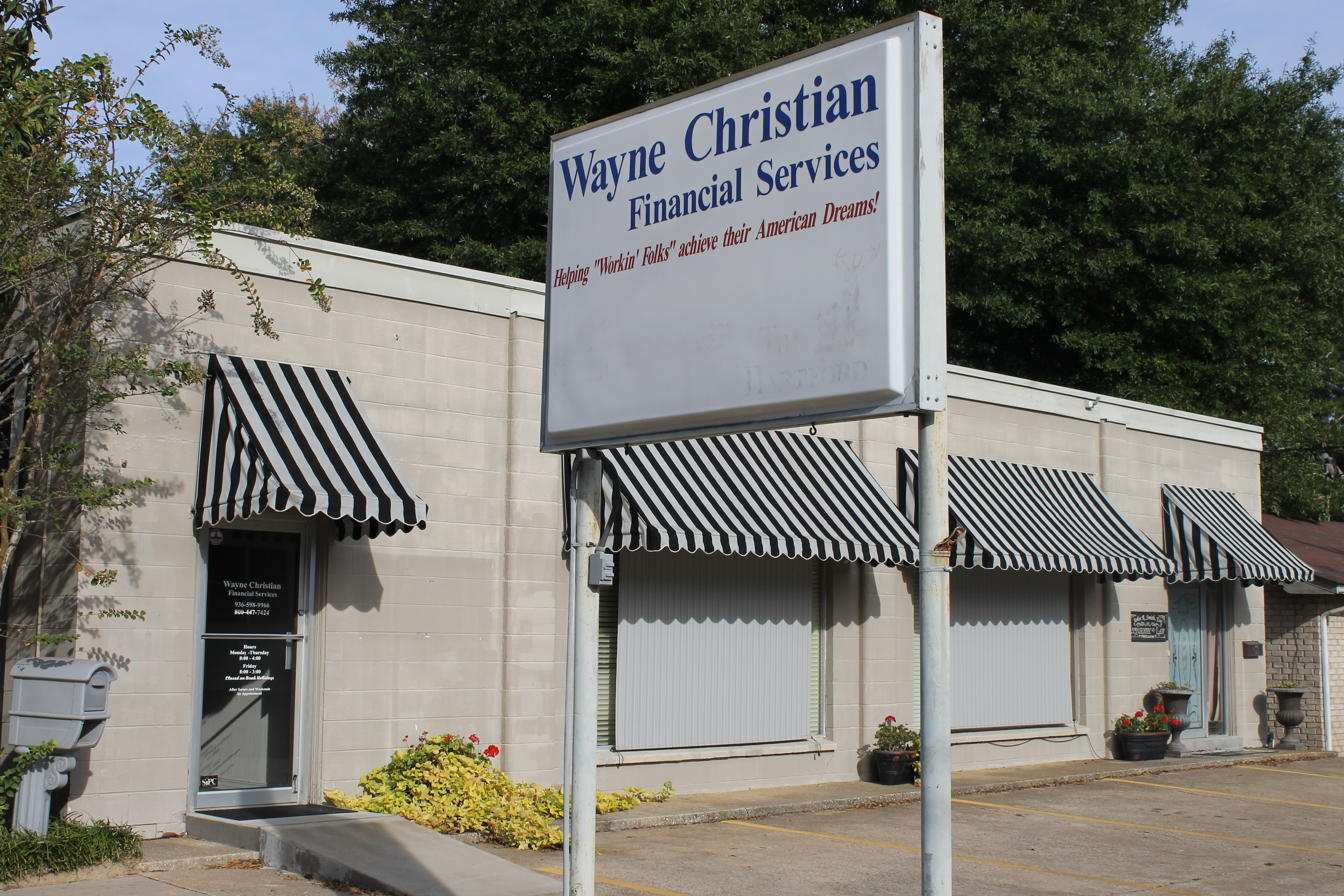
Wayne Christian Financial Services office is near the Shelby County Courthouse in Center, Texas.

Christian is an agent of Woodbury Financial Services. He holds a Bachelor of Business Administration degree from Stephen F. Austin State University in Nacogdoches, where he minored in marketing.

== Political life ==
Christian became a member of the Texas House of Representatives for District 9 on January 14, 1997. He is a conservative Christian and opposed to abortion. He is the former president of the Texas Conservative Coalition, a bipartisan caucus of conservative legislators. He was also a board member of the Texas TEA Party Caucus. During his tenure in the legislature, Christian was heavily involved in energy and oil and gas issues, serving on the Energy Resources Committee and as Vice Chairman of the Regulated Industries Committee. He also served as Vice Chairman of the Criminal Jurisprudence committee and on the Ways and Means Committee.

Throughout his years as a member of the Texas House, Christian received numerous awards for his conservative voting record.

The Texas Supreme Court has since sided with the private landowners in the area and upheld the private property protections put in place by Hamilton's amendment.

Under the 2012 redistricting plan for the Texas House, Christian's home in Center was placed in a district in which approximately 80 percent of the constituents were new to him. He was one of several senior House Republicans who were either paired with other members of their party or relocated into largely new population districts.

Christian was unseated in the Republican primary held on May 29, 2012, by the Straus-endorsed Chris Paddie, 8,552 votes (47.8 percent) to 9,327 ballots (52.2 percent).

== Candidacy for Texas Railroad Commission ==
=== 2014 ===
Christian ran unsuccessfully for one of the three elected seats on the Texas Railroad Commission in the Republican runoff election held on May 27, 2014.

=== 2016 ===
In 2016, Christian became the Republican nominee for the commissioner spot held by David J. Porter, who did not seek re-election to a second term. In the Republican primary on March 1, Christian finished second among seven candidates with 408,629 votes (19.8 percent). Businessman Gary Gates of Richmond, Texas, led the balloting with 586,253 votes (28.4 percent).

In December 2015, Christian temporarily suspended his campaign to care for his elderly mother but was soon back soliciting supporters. He was endorsed by the political action committee, Texas Patriots Tea Party.

Christian polled 4,648,841 votes (53.1 percent); Yarbrough, 3,362,041 (38.4 percent); Miller, 462,251 (5.3 percent), and Salinas, 287,105 (3.2 percent).

=== 2022 ===
Christian ran for re-election to a second six-year term. In the Republican primary he fell short of the majority securing only 47% of the vote and as such proceeded to a runoff with attorney Sarah Stogner. Christian won the runoff and was re-elected in the general election with 55.4% of the vote.

Political offices
Preceded by David J. Porter	Member of the Texas Railroad Commission; 2017–present Served alongside: Christi Craddick, Jim Wright	Incumbent
