= Christian country music =

Music genre, country music with Christian message

- Stylistic origins: Country; Southern gospel; hymns; Jesus music
- Cultural origins: Mid 20th century by secular country music artists and Southern Gospel acts

Subgenres
- Bluegrass gospel

Regional scenes
- Southeastern and Midwestern United States

Other topics
- Gospel Music Association - Christian music

Christian country music (sometimes marketed as country gospel, gospel country, positive country or inspirational country) is music that is written to express either personal or a communal belief regarding Christian life, as well as (in terms of the varying music styles) to give a Christian alternative to mainstream secular music. Christian country music is a form of Christian music, and a subgenre of both Gospel music and Country music.

== Characteristic ==
Christian country musicians are artists who blend traditional country music with faith of Christian music. Like other forms of music, the creation, performance, significance, and even the definition of Christian country music varies according to culture and social context. It is composed and performed for many purposes, ranging from aesthetic pleasure, religious or ceremonial purposes with a positive message, or as an entertainment product for the marketplace. A common theme as with most Christian music is praise, worship or thanks to God and/or Christ.

== Organizations ==
Many Christian country organizations have been around for a great number of years. The oldest of all of these organizations is the International Country Gospel Music Association which was founded in 1957. These organizations were founded to further artists careers much in the same manner as the GMA, NARAS or CMA. Many of these organizations have yearly conventions which hosts music showcases and awards shows. The CCMA was sued by the CMA for award name right infringement. The CCMA renamed their awards show after a federal judge ruled that they could no longer use the name. The new name is the ICM Music Awards' which stands for "Inspirational Country Music".

== Radio ==
Radio personality Bob Wilson was one of the first radio personalities to see the potential of the genre. His weekly show Gospel Country Round-up aired for many years playing southern and Christian country music. Many Christian country stations today are going the way of Internet stations. That is a positive move for this genre, however, because there are few terrestrial radio stations that play a strictly Christian country format. Many mainstream country stations only have a weekly Sunday Country Gospel show.

Christian country has several syndicated programs. The Country Gospel Countdown has broadcast since 1984 and syndicated since 1988, The Country Parson radio program with host Scott Perkins, broadcast since 1995 and has been syndicated since 1998. Today's Cross Country with Marty Smith, broadcast since 1995, syndicated since 1996. Ken's Country Radio Show, The Radio Hour, Country Messenger, The Ranch radio show on KKUS, and Canadian produced Riverside Country. The Country Gospel Music Guild also airs a weekly radio program while Circuit Rider Radio airs on conventional and satellite radio worldwide.

Other syndicated weekend shows that feature Inspirational and Positive Country music are Power Source Top 20, and finally, the American Christian Music Review for United Stations Radio Networks. These programs are aired nationwide weekly on both Country and Southern Gospel radio stations.

AM/FM and Internet stations that play Christian Country Music include 90.5 KJIC Christian Country Radio, CBN Cross Country, HLE Radio, Heaven's Country and 89.9 Today's Christian Country.

== Country gospel musicians ==
Many secular country music artists have recorded country gospel songs or have performed them on their radio and television programs. From 1956–1960, two network shows usually concluded with a gospel number, which was popular with viewers: The Tennessee Ernie Ford Show and Red Foley's Ozark Jubilee. Other shows like Hee Haw, the Barbara Mandrell & the Mandrell Sisters, and the Statler Brothers implemented the same programming style. Hee Haw featured a gospel song at the end of each of its shows. Stars Roy Clark, Buck Owens, Grandpa Jones, and Kenny Price would sing a traditional hymn or a well-known song by mainstream country and Christian artists. The segment itself served as a balance to the show's loony, corn-style humor. The Grand Ole Opry, the longest running radio show and one of the most popular country music shows, includes gospel music as a part of its program.

In the past, most Christian country music was recorded by musicians with southern gospel flair like the Oak Ridge Boys, Grandpa Jones, Webb Pierce, Red Sovine, Mercy River Boys, The Louvin Brothers, and the Carter Family. More mainstream country artists, ranging from Loretta Lynn and Dolly Parton to Alabama and Alan Jackson, recorded gospel albums while continuing to record secular music. Johnny Cash, a devout Christian, recorded several best-selling gospel albums and included a Christian song during his concerts. Webb Pierce released the album Faith Hope and Love, which included the gospel song "I Love Him Dearly". Ray Stevens, a musician known primarily for his comedy and novelty recordings, recorded an album of Christian music. Songs included "Everything is Beautiful" and "Mississippi Squirrel Revival". Although the Oak Ridge Boys began releasing secular country songs in the late 1970s, they maintained their gospel roots by recording religious material and performing gospel songs in their concerts, as well as producing songs stressing Christian values and family unity.

The Mercy River Boys released their debut album, Breakout (via Canaan Records) in 1979, firmly establishing the new Christian Country genre. Don Cusic (Billboard Magazine, Vol. 90, No 31), credits Canaan Records for creating a band to crossover into country music, improving "what is essentially a good product (gospel) and made it become commercially viable." The Mercy River Boys charted hits in Country, Southern Gospel and on traditional Gospel formats. Other gospel groups followed the Oak Ridge Boys and the Mercy River Boys into Christian Country music.

At times, gospel and Christian-themed songs earned mass mainstream appeal. Among the most popular of these songs included "Why Me" by Kris Kristofferson (1973), "The Seeker" by Dolly Parton (1975), "One Day at a Time" by Cristy Lane (1980), "Three Wooden Crosses" by Randy Travis (2003), "Long Black Train" by Josh Turner (2003), "Jesus, Take the Wheel" by Carrie Underwood (2005), and "When I Get Where I'm Going" by Brad Paisley (2006).

== Christian country magazines ==
- Christian Music Weekly (formerly CCRB) since 1990
- Power Source Magazine
- Circuit Rider Magazine
- Christian Country Gospel News
- Super Christian Country
- Singing News magazine

== See also ==
- List of Christian country artists
