= Madisonville, Kentucky =

- City
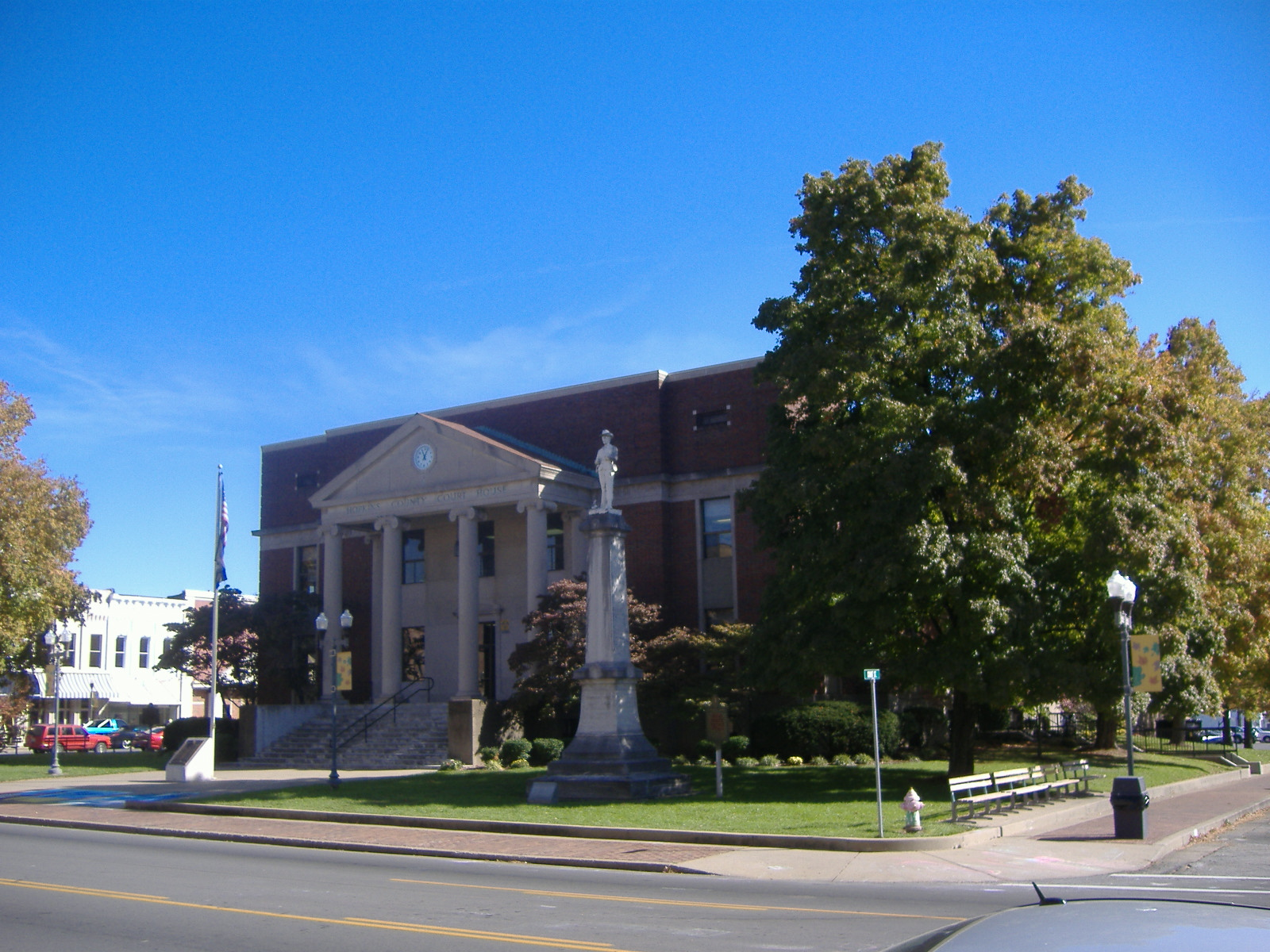
- Hopkins County Courthouse and Confederate Monument in Madisonville

- Flag Seal
- Nickname: "Best Town on Earth"
- Location of Madisonville in Hopkins County, Kentucky
- Coordinates: 37°19′58″N 87°30′8″W
- Country: United States
- State: Kentucky
- County: Hopkins
- Incorporated: 1807
- Named for: James Madison

Government
  - Mayor: Kevin Cotton (R)

Area
  - Total: 18.66 sq mi (48.33 km^{2})
  - Land: 17.86 sq mi (46.27 km^{2})
  - Water: 0.80 sq mi (2.06 km^{2})
- Elevation: 472 ft (144 m)

Population (2020)
  - Total: 19,542
  - Estimate (2022): 19,214
  - Density: 1,093.8/sq mi (422.32/km^{2})
- Time zone: UTC−6 (CST)
  - Summer (DST): UTC−5 (CDT)
- ZIP code: 42431
- Area codes: 270 & 364 270
- FIPS code: 21-49368
- GNIS feature ID: 0497441
- Website: madisonvilleliving.com

Madisonville is a city in and the county seat of Hopkins County, Kentucky, United States, located along Interstate 69 in the state's Western Coal Fields region. As of the 2020 census, Madisonville had a population of 19,542. Madisonville is a commercial center of the region and is home to Madisonville Community College.

== History ==
Madisonville was founded in 1807 and named for then-Secretary of State James Madison. It was named the seat of Hopkins County in 1808 and formally incorporated in 1810.

Hopkins County and Madisonville were divided by the Civil War. Union supporters joined a regiment recruited locally by James Shackleford; Al Fowler recruited Confederate troops. The courthouse in Madisonville was burned by Confederates led by Gen. Hylan B. Lyon on December 17, 1864, as they passed through western Kentucky. While Kentucky remained mostly in the Union, half the state had seceded at the Russellville Convention and was controlled by the Confederacy early in the war before being conquered by the Union.

Farming was the major occupation in Hopkins County for most of the 1800s, with tobacco the leading crop. Around 1837 an outcropping of coal was discovered, and the first coal mine in the county opened in 1869. Mining did not become a major industry until the Louisville & Nashville Railroad pushed its line southward from Henderson through Madisonville and toward Nashville in 1870.

Madisonville was home to schools for African Americans including Atkinson Literary and Industrial College.

From 1892 to 1912 The Hustler, originally The Madisonville Hustler, was a newspaper serving Madisonville.

By the early 1900s, Madisonville was a rail hub, coal mining center, and had a large tobacco market. This continued until the 1960s when manufacturing and service industries came to the area.

== Storms ==
On November 15, 2005, a tornado ripped through the city, destroying some parts of it. The tornado began to form around 3:00 PM. The neighborhood near the Madisonville Country Club was greatly affected by the storm. The home of Madisonville resident and former Boston Celtics star Frank Ramsey was destroyed in the storm. Mayor Karen Cunningham ordered a curfew in parts of the city and declared a state of emergency.

In January 2009, a severe ice storm hit Madisonville. Hopkins County and much of the rest of state of Kentucky were affected. Madisonville was placed under a curfew for the safety of the citizens. The storm was responsible for widespread power outages and damage to homes as well as trees. Many residents were without power for weeks, and tree limb clean-up took months to complete. Many out-of-state power companies assisted the local power companies to speed up the process of re-powering the town.

== Geography ==
Madisonville is located about 50 miles (80 km) south of Evansville, Indiana. Interstate 69 (formerly the Pennyrile Parkway) passes through the eastern side of the city, with access from exits 111, 114, and 117. U.S. Route 41 passes through the center of town as Main Street, running generally parallel to I-69. The highways lead north 38 miles (61 km) to Henderson and south 35 miles (56 km) to Hopkinsville.

According to the United States Census Bureau, Madisonville has a total area of 18.7 square miles (48.4 km^{2}), of which 17.9 square miles (46.3 km^{2}) are land and 0.81 square miles (2.1 km^{2}), or 4.42%, are water.

== Climate ==
The climate in this area is characterized by hot, humid summers and generally mild to cool winters. According to the Köppen Climate Classification system, Madisonville has a humid subtropical climate, abbreviated "Cfa" on climate maps.

Climate data for Madisonville, Kentucky (1991–2020 normals, extremes 1948–present)
Month	Jan	Feb	Mar	Apr	May	Jun	Jul	Aug	Sep	Oct	Nov	Dec	Year
Record high °F (°C)	77 (25)	80 (27)	87 (31)	91 (33)	95 (35)	105 (41)	105 (41)	105 (41)	105 (41)	96 (36)	85 (29)	79 (26)	105 (41)
Mean maximum °F (°C)	65.4 (18.6)	72.1 (22.3)	79.2 (26.2)	85.7 (29.8)	89.7 (32.1)	94.2 (34.6)	96.5 (35.8)	97.0 (36.1)	93.7 (34.3)	86.8 (30.4)	76.6 (24.8)	68.1 (20.1)	98.3 (36.8)
Mean daily maximum °F (°C)	44.8 (7.1)	49.9 (9.9)	60.0 (15.6)	71.5 (21.9)	79.1 (26.2)	86.3 (30.2)	89.3 (31.8)	88.7 (31.5)	83.1 (28.4)	71.9 (22.2)	58.4 (14.7)	48.0 (8.9)	69.2 (20.7)
Daily mean °F (°C)	36.5 (2.5)	40.7 (4.8)	49.7 (9.8)	60.4 (15.8)	69.1 (20.6)	76.5 (24.7)	79.6 (26.4)	78.5 (25.8)	72.2 (22.3)	61.0 (16.1)	49.2 (9.6)	40.1 (4.5)	59.5 (15.3)
Mean daily minimum °F (°C)	28.3 (−2.1)	31.6 (−0.2)	39.4 (4.1)	49.4 (9.7)	59.0 (15.0)	66.7 (19.3)	69.9 (21.1)	68.3 (20.2)	61.3 (16.3)	50.1 (10.1)	39.9 (4.4)	32.2 (0.1)	49.7 (9.8)
Mean minimum °F (°C)	5.2 (−14.9)	10.4 (−12.0)	19.0 (−7.2)	30.3 (−0.9)	41.5 (5.3)	53.0 (11.7)	58.7 (14.8)	57.2 (14.0)	43.7 (6.5)	30.8 (−0.7)	20.8 (−6.2)	12.3 (−10.9)	2.5 (−16.4)
Record low °F (°C)	−20 (−29)	−23 (−31)	−5 (−21)	22 (−6)	29 (−2)	41 (5)	47 (8)	45 (7)	33 (1)	20 (−7)	−2 (−19)	−14 (−26)	−23 (−31)
Average precipitation inches (mm)	3.77 (96)	4.01 (102)	5.28 (134)	5.16 (131)	5.12 (130)	4.93 (125)	5.02 (128)	2.68 (68)	3.51 (89)	4.06 (103)	4.13 (105)	4.54 (115)	52.21 (1,326)
Average precipitation days (≥ 0.01 in)	10.6	9.5	11.7	11.1	11.6	10.3	9.7	8.1	7.6	8.3	9.1	10.7	118.3
Source: NOAA

== Demographics ==
Historical population
Census	Pop.	Note	%±
1810	37		—
1830	112		—
1840	51		−54.5%
1860	604		—
1870	1,022		69.2%
1880	1,544		51.1%
1890	2,212		43.3%
1900	3,628		64.0%
1910	4,966		36.9%
1920	5,030		1.3%
1930	6,908		37.3%
1940	8,209		18.8%
1950	11,132		35.6%
1960	13,110		17.8%
1970	15,332		16.9%
1980	16,979		10.7%
1990	16,200		−4.6%
2000	19,307		19.2%
2010	19,591		1.5%
2020	19,542		−0.3%
2024 (est.)	19,502		−0.2%
U.S. Decennial Census

=== 2020 census ===
As of the 2020 census, Madisonville had a population of 19,542. The median age was 39.5 years. 23.1% of residents were under the age of 18 and 18.7% of residents were 65 years of age or older. For every 100 females there were 91.0 males, and for every 100 females age 18 and over there were 89.6 males age 18 and over.

91.9% of residents lived in urban areas, while 8.1% lived in rural areas.

There were 8,174 households in Madisonville, of which 29.9% had children under the age of 18 living in them. Of all households, 39.9% were married-couple households, 18.5% were households with a male householder and no spouse or partner present, and 34.3% were households with a female householder and no spouse or partner present. About 33.5% of all households were made up of individuals and 14.0% had someone living alone who was 65 years of age or older.

There were 9,140 housing units, of which 10.6% were vacant. The homeowner vacancy rate was 3.0% and the rental vacancy rate was 10.2%.

Racial composition as of the 2020 census
Race	Number	Percent
White	15,449	79.1%
Black or African American	2,307	11.8%
American Indian and Alaska Native	50	0.3%
Asian	180	0.9%
Native Hawaiian and Other Pacific Islander	21	0.1%
Some other race	316	1.6%
Two or more races	1,219	6.2%
Hispanic or Latino (of any race)	673	3.4%

=== 2000 census ===
As of the census of 2000, there were 19,307 people, 8,077 households, and 5,330 families residing in the city. The population density was 1,085.0 inhabitants per square mile (418.9/km^{2}). There were 8,889 housing units at an average density of 499.5 per square mile (192.9/km^{2}). The racial makeup of the city was 86.21% White, 11.24% Black or African American, 0.18% Native American, 0.51% Asian, 0.03% Pacific Islander, 0.63% from other races, and 1.20% from two or more races. Hispanic or Latino of any race were 1.34% of the population.

There were 8,077 households, out of which 30.0% had children under the age of 18 living with them, 48.8% were married couples living together, 14.2% had a female householder with no husband present, and 34.0% were non-families. 30.4% of all households were made up of individuals, and 13.3% had someone living alone who was 65 years of age or older. The average household size was 2.31 and the average family size was 2.87.

In the city, the population was spread out, with 23.9% under the age of 18, 8.3% from 18 to 24, 27.4% from 25 to 44, 23.6% from 45 to 64, and 16.8% who were 65 years of age or older. The median age was 39 years. For every 100 females, there were 85.9 males. For every 100 females age 18 and over, there were 81.7 males.

The median income for a household in the city was $31,097, and the median income for a family was $38,688. Males had a median income of $32,064 versus $20,940 for females. The per capita income for the city was $19,381. About 13.0% of families and 16.4% of the population were below the poverty line, including 27.5% of those under age 18 and 7.8% of those age 65 or over.

== Economy ==
Because of its location near important roadways, Madisonville is a leading manufacturing hub for western Kentucky. Industrial and factory production has revitalized the local post-coal economy. GE Aviation, Jennmar, International Automotive Components Group (IAC), Ahlstrom, Land O' Frost, Carhartt Cutting in Madisonville, Carhartt RCV Distribution in nearby Hanson, Kentucky and other corporations have operations in the area.

During the 1970s, the Regional Medical Center (RMC) and Trover Clinic were built by the Trover Foundation. RMC, now owned by Baptist Healthcare System and operated as Baptist Health Madisonville is a 410-bed hospital that offers services typically found in larger cities (such as life flight, women's health centers, and a comprehensive cancer center).

Madisonville is a wet city in the county of Hopkins County; making it a moist county, one of only sixteen in the state.

== Government ==
Madisonville is a home-rule class city and the county seat of Hopkins County. Government operations for the city are based out of several buildings including a government building on Center Street and the Madisonville City Hall on Main Street.

== Education ==
Madisonville and most of Hopkins County are in the Hopkins County School District. Hopkins County Schools operate eight elementary school, four middle school, and two high school sub-districts.

Elementary schools: Grapevine Elementary, West Broadway Elementary, Pride Avenue Elementary, Hanson Elementary, Earlington Elementary, Jesse Stuart Elementary, Southside Elementary, and West Hopkins School.

Middle schools: Browning Springs Middle School, South Hopkins Middle School, West Hopkins School, and James Madison Middle School.

High schools: Hopkins County Central High School and Madisonville North Hopkins High School.

Madisonville is also home to Madisonville Community College, which consolidated with Madisonville Technical College in 2001. The college is a member of the sixteen-college Kentucky Community and Technical College System (KCTCS). The school is also affiliated with Murray State University, Lindsey Wilson College, the University of Kentucky, and the University of Louisville. Because of these university partnerships, the college offers many associate and bachelor's degrees that are normally found only at the university level.

Madisonville has a lending library, a branch of the Hopkins County-Madisonville Public Library.

== Transportation ==
Interstate 69 is a north–south corridor through the eastern side of the city that connects to I-24 and Henderson. The Western Kentucky Parkway is 9 miles (14 km) south of town. The Western Kentucky Parkway's westbound lanes feed into I-69 southbound; the eastbound lanes feed into the Blue Grass Parkway (via I-65 northbound) at Elizabethtown. The Western Kentucky Parkway also intersects I-65, which feeds into Bowling Green to the south and the Natcher Parkway. In addition to trucking routes, CSX Transportation and Paducah & Louisville Railway run through Madisonville.

The Madisonville Municipal Airport has a runway that is 6,050 by 100 feet (1,844 m × 30 m).

== Sister City ==
Since 2012, Madisonville has maintained a sister city relationship with Dongying, China.

== Notable people ==
- Leva Bates, professional wrestler
- Jeremy Clark, NFL player
- Odessa Grady Clay, mother of three-time World Heavyweight Champion Muhammad Ali
- Sonny Collins, college football and NFL player
- Mark Dever, senior pastor of Capitol Hill Baptist Church and president of 9Marks
- Gary Dulin, college football and NFL player
- Travis Ford, college basketball player and coach
- The Happy Goodman Family, Southern gospel family group, including founding members Vestal Goodman, Howard Goodman, Charles "Rusty" Goodman, and Sam Goodman
- Demetrious Johnson, UFC flyweight champion
- Polk Laffoon, former U.S. congressman
- Ruby Laffoon, governor of Kentucky, 1931–1935
- Tim Maypray, professional football player
- Justin Miller, professional football player
- Byron Parker, professional football player
- Dottie Rambo, gospel singer/songwriter
- Frank Ramsey, Hall of Fame basketball player
- Jimmy Roberts, singer with The Lawrence Welk Show, 1954–1982
