= Johnny Minick =

American singer

- Born: July 8, 1955 (age 70)
- Origin: Little Rock, Arkansas, United States
- Genres: Gospel, southern gospel
- Occupation(s): Evangelist, musician, recording artist, singer, songwriter, arranger, record producer, pastor
- Instrument: Piano
- Years active: 1968–present
- Labels: River of Life Music Group, Spring Hill Records, Pamplin Entertainment, Crowne/Spring Hill, River Bend Media
- Website: johnnyminick.com

Johnny Minick (born July 8, 1955) is an American gospel singer, songwriter, arranger, recording artist, record producer, and pastor.

== Biography ==
Johnny Minick was born in Little Rock, Arkansas. He grew up in a musical family where much of his childhood was spent singing and playing music. Minick was trained in classical music and developed an interest in jazz.

At the early age of three, Minick started playing the guitar. By four, he was singing solos and accompanying himself with his instrument. When Minick was six years of age, he discovered the keyboards during a visit to an aunt in Memphis. Within a few hours he was forming chords and played a song with such skill his aunt gave him her upright piano. Much of Minick's childhood was spent playing the piano and singing. His parents enrolled him in formal training. At eight years of age he made a few appearances in churches and on radio.

In 1968, at twelve years of age, Minick felt the call to ministry. By the time he was 17, he partnered with his father, John Minick, a gospel songwriter, to organize a premier gospel quartet known as The Majestic Sounds. They sang in concert halls and in churches and appeared on numerous television shows.

One evening in 1972, a Happy Goodman Family show, "An Evening with the Happy Goodmans" included a performance by The Majestic Sounds with Johnny Minick who accompanied them on the keyboard. Their performance caught the ear of the Goodmans. After the concert, Charles "Rusty" Goodman approached Minick about joining them as their pianist. It wasn't until 1975 that he would accept the position.

In 1974, Minick married his sweetheart, Sherry McDonald, who was a talented singer in her own right, becoming his best friend and life partner.

In 1975, Minick joined The Happy Goodman Family and worked with them for three years until July 1977 after the birth of his son, Aaron. He left the group to start his Evangelistic ministry with his own family in Little Rock Arkansas. The Minicks traveled the country singing Southern Gospel Music and preaching as the Johnny Minick Family. Minick was also lead singer, pianist, and arranger for popular Arkansas quartet The Melody Boys Quartet from 1984 through December 1986. In the early 1990s the Johnny Minick Family began to record and enjoyed national success with the songs "How Long", "The Church is Alive and Well", "We'll Soon Be Done" and "That's No Hill for a Climber" that gained exposure on Christian radio stations.

He maintained his friendship with the Goodmans and rejoined the group reformed as The Happy Goodman Family during the reunion in 1990. It wasn't long they joined Gaither Homecoming concerts.

After the death of Rusty and Sam Goodman, the Johnny Minick Family would team up with Howard and Vestal Goodman in concert.

In 1992, the Minicks moved to the Nashville area to pioneer River of Life Assembly of God in Smyrna, Tennessee where singing and preaching go hand in hand. They began local television broadcasts of church services and concerts with well-known Southern Gospel artists. Howard and Vestal Goodman attended the church and sang the old songs that were familiar with the Happy Goodman Family. During this same time, Bill Gaither began the Gaither Homecoming video series. In 1996 Howard and Vestal Goodman asked Johnny Minick to join them as their third voice for some of the early videos. Bill Gaither heard the trio for the first time and invited them to join the Gaither Homecoming concert tour. The Happy Goodmans were reinvented and he sang with them until 2002.

Minick continued to pastor the Smyrna River of Life Church on Sam Ridley Parkway and with the Goodmans until Howard Goodman's death in 2002. In 2005, he produced The Sweetest Song I know, A Tribute to the Happy Goodmans. As of 2012, Minick is listed as senior pastor at Smyrna River of Life.

In 2013, Minick and the Goodman Family reunited for a new group, the Goodman Revival, with Rusty Goodman's daughter Tanya Sykes along with her husband Michael.

== Discography ==
- The Sweetest Song I Know
- How Long
- The Church is Alive and Well
- We'll Soon Be Done
- That's No Hill for a Climber
- No Thorns in the Crown
- When Life Is at Its Worst
- Had It Not Been
- When the Rains Come
- This Is Just What Heaven
- The Reason
- Worship Medley: Til the Storm Passes By/We’ll Understand It Better
- Walk Together Children
- Come See Me
- Faithful Man
- I Don’t Regret a Mile
- Who Am I
