= List of songs written by Dottie Rambo =

See also Dottie Rambo discography

This is a list of songs written by the American gospel songwriter Dottie Rambo. Rambo wrote over 2500 songs throughout her lifetime, and many have been recorded by hundreds of artists.

Songs are listed in alphabetical order and followed in parentheses by other notable artists who have recorded or performed the song.

== A ==
- Ain't Gonna Let The Mountains Praise The Lord
- Ain't It Good To See The Sunshine Again
- And That's The Way It Was
- Angels Sound The Golden Trumpet
- Another Mountain, Another Valley
- Artist, The
- As Long As We Can Talk It Over
- As Long As You Walk With Me

== B ==
- Before You Die
- Behold The Lamb (David Phelps, Dottie Rambo and The Christ Church Choir)
- Being Me
- Between Here And Sunset
- Big House On The Hill
- Big, Big Man
- Billy
- Brand New Breed Of Believers, A
- Brand New Feeling, A
- Breaking Bread
- Bring All Your Needs To The Altar (Jimmy Swaggart)
- Build My Mansion (Next Door to Jesus)
- By And By The Night Will Vanish

== C ==
- Camp Goo-la-Mock-EE
- Castaway
- Caught In The Middle And Holding
- Church Triumphant, The
- Closer Home
- Come Spring (Gaither Homecoming)
- Constantly Aware Of His Love
- Cup of Woe

== D ==
- Dad's Grave
- Dark Valley
- Destined For The Throne
- Don't It Make You Feel Little
- Don't Let Me Walk Too Far from Calvary (Connie Smith)
- Don't Lift The Anchor
- Don't Pick Up The Pieces
- Don't Take Jesus (He's Life To Me)
- Don't Take My Cross Away
- Don't Wish The Good Times Away
- Down By The Creek Bank

== E ==
- End Of The Story, The
- Entrance Music
- Eternity Will Be Long Enough

== F ==
- Father Dear I'm Coming Home
- Fill In The Blanks
- First Million Years
- First Time I Heard About Heaven, The
- First Time I'll Be Home
- Flesh Of My Flesh, Bone Of My Bone
- Foggin' In My Noggin'
- Follow The Leader
- For The Rest Of Your Life
- For What Earthly Reason (Janet Paschal)
- Frog With A Freckle
- From Earth To Somewhere
- Full Up No Vacancy

== G ==
- Garden Of My Heart, The
- Germs (My Invisible Dog)
- Gettin' To Know You Better
- Ginny Is Afraid Of The Dark
- Give Him All The Glory
- God Has No Certain Dwelling Place
- God, Could You Use Another Kid On Your Team?
- God, Make Me Proud Of My Country
- God's House Of Rest
- Going Through And Growing Through The Trials
- Going To A Wedding
- Going Toward The Setting Of The Sun
- Good Lord Walks With Me, The
- Good Ole Days, The
- Grand Dot Grace
- Grass Is Greener On The Other Side, The

== H ==
- Harbor In The Time Of Storm
- Harvest, The
- He Ain't Never Done Me Nothing But Good (Carol Channing)
- He Changed My Tears To Showers Of Blessings
- He Could See The Eagle In Me
- He Has A Name
- He Hasn't Lost His Touch
- He Held On When Your Arms Let Me Go
- He Just Takes Me
- He Knows Just When To Give The Song
- He Looked Beyond My Fault And Saw My Need (Andraé Crouch, Jerry Lee Lewis, The Oak Ridge Boys)
- He Loved Me To Death
- He Must Die
- He Never Once Stopped Believing In Me
- He Never Sends Me Where He's Never Been
- He Plants Me Like A Seed
- He Restoreth My Soul (In the Valley)
- He Sees Me Through The Blood
- He Waits For The Sound Of My Voice
- He Was The Talk Of The Town
- He Went Out Of His Way
- He's Already On His Way
- Headed For Judgment
- Healer's Comin' Down The Road, The
- Heaven Will Never Welcome A Sweeter Mama
- His Name Is A Strong Tower
- His Steps Didn't Stop At Calvary
- Holy Hills Of Heaven Call Me, The (Gaither Homecoming, Vestal Goodman)
- Holy Spirit Thou Art Welcome In This Place
- Home Never Looked So Good To Me
- Home's Where The Heart Is
- How Graciously Grace Has Covered My Sin
- Hymn From Way Back Home

== I ==
- I Am Adopted
- I Call Him Lord (Mark Lowry)
- I Can Rise Above It
- I Don't Have The Heart
- I Don't Want To Do Anything
- I Found My Place
- I Gave Him Nothing 'Til I Gave Him All
- I Gave It All Away
- I Go To The Rock (Danniebelle Hall, Whitney Houston, Aaron Jeoffrey, The Crabb Family)
- I Have Hope
- I Hear The Sound Of Rain
- I Heard Footsteps
- I Just Came Into His Presence
- I Just Came To Talk With You Lord (Gaither Homecoming)
- I Love The Name
- I Still Believe
- I Tell My Secrets To The Lord
- I Want To Live So I Can Die Right
- I Will Glory In The Cross (Larnelle Harris)
- I Will Lift You There
- I Will Never Turn Back
- I Will Not Overshadow
- I Wonder If The Angels Could Use Another Singer
- I Won't Ask For More
- If Heaven's A Dream (Let Me Dream On)
- If I Could Do It All Over Again
- If I Were My Brother
- If Jesus Is There
- If That Isn't Love (Elvis Presley, The Imperials, George Beverly Shea)
- I'll Only Love Him Forever
- I'll Sleep Beside You Someday
- I'll Still Feel The Same About You
- I'm Allergic To Yellow Roses
- I'm Gonna Leave Here Shoutin'
- I'm Not A Mountain
- I'm Longing To Go
- I'm Only Gonna Be Here Long Enough
- I'm Simply Lost For Words
- In And Out
- In One Mind
- In The Beginning
- Into The Holy Of Holies
- Is That The Lights Of Home
- Is There Anything I Can Do For You
- It Will Pass
- It's All In Jesus
- It's Hard To Sing The Blues
- It's Me Again Lord
- I've Been Talkin' To The Lord About You
- I've Learned To Lean On The Lord
- I've Never Been This Homesick Before (Jason Crabb, Jessy Dixon)
- I've Seen All This World (I Want To See)

== J ==
- Jesus Means Everything To Me
- Jesus Thou Art Fairer To Me
- Jesus! Star Of The Morning
- Jubilee Band
- Just Couldn't Cut the Bluegrass
- Just Enough Heaven
- Just For A Day
- Just In Time
- Just One Of A Kind (Hank Snow, Rhonda Vincent, Jim and Jesse)
- Just Want To Thank You Sweet Lord (a.k.a. Thank You Sweet Lord)

== K ==
- Keep A Lamp Shining Bright
- Keeper Of The Well (Cathedral Quartet)
- Kind Shepherd, The
- King Is Tried, The (Medley)

== L ==
- Lamb Of Glory
- The Legend Continues
- Let Go Of This World
- Lights
- Little Boy
- Looks Like Everybody's Got A Kingdom
- Lord Of Me
- Lord, Do It Again
- Lord, Walk With Me
- Lost Years
- Love Is
- Love Letters

== M ==
- Made Up Mind
- Makin' My Own Place
- Mama Always Had A Song To Sing
- Mama Rocked My Cradle
- Mama's Teaching Angels How To Sing (The Isaacs)
- Mama's Treasures
- Marvelous Grace (The Imperials)
- Mary Was The First One To Carry The Gospel
- Maybe When The Sun Comes Up
- Mercy Throne, The
- Midnight In the Middle Of The Day
- Million Treasures
- Mom, You Don't Have To Call Me Everyday
- Motion Pictures
- Move Upon Us Oh Holy Spirit
- Multiply
- Must Be My Soul Givin' Away
- My Altar
- My Father Is A King
- My Heart Can See
- My Heart Is Fixed
- My Old Friend
- My Song Is New (My Story's Old)
- My Unchanging Friend
- My Visit To Heaven

== N ==
- Naaman
- New Beulah Land, The
- New Dedication, A
- New Shoes
- No Less A King
- No Lock On My Mansion Door (Kingsmen Quartet)
- Not Until
- Nothing (a.k.a. There's Nothing My God Can't Do) (Vestal Goodman)
- Nothing Like Home To Me
- Now You Can Walk With Me

== O ==
- Oh Blessed Hope (Dottie Rambo, Steve Brock, Vestal Goodman)
- Oil And The Wine, The
- Old Home Place
- On The Sunny Banks (The Oak Ridge Boys, Gaither Homecoming)
- One Day Nearer Home
- One Door To Heaven
- One More Chance
- One More Valley (Carol Channing, Bob Cain)
- One Step At A Time
- Other Side Of Me, The
- Out To Sea
- Overture

== P–Q ==
- Papa
- Parables
- Perfect Rose (The)
- Prisoner Of Love (Chuck Wagon Gang)
- Promises
- Puzzles
- Queen Of Paradise

== R ==
- Reach Out For The Life Line
- Reach Out Your Hand
- Reaching Around The World
- Red Scarlet Cross, The
- Remind Me Dear Lord (The Happy Goodman Family)
- Resurrection Day
- Ringing Of The Hammer, The
- Road That Leads To Heaven, The
- Running My Last Mile Home

== S ==
- Sailing Toward Home
- Sandals, The
- Scratch
- Send In The Cloud
- Senses
- Sheltered In The Arms Of God (The Blackwood Brothers)
- Shepherd Of The Hills
- Silent Bells
- Sing Alleluia To The Lamb
- Sing Me A Song Of Tomorrow
- So My Feet Can't Get Wet
- Solid Gold
- Somebody Else Will
- Somebody Prayed For Me
- Somebody Stepped On Board
- Somebody's Busy (And I Think I Know Who It Is)
- Someday Jesus Will Take Me Away
- Son Is Shining
- Sons Of Thunder, Daughters Of The Light
- Soul Of Me, The
- Soul Was Born, A
- Souvenirs Of Yesterday
- Speak Through Me
- Stable Housed A Mighty King, The
- Stand By The River
- Stand Still And See His Glory
- Still Small Voice, A
- Sunday Is Father's Day
- Sunshine Shine On
- Superman, Superfriend
- Sweet Mountain Mornin'

== T ==
- T.L.C.
- Take Me For A Cleansing
- Taste Of The Lamb, The
- Teach Me To Pray
- Tears Will Never Stain The Streets Of That City (The Crabb Family)
- Thank You For The Valley
- Thank You Sweet Lord
- Thanks For Just Being You
- That Same Road
- That Was Before The Cross And The Crown
- That's Just His Way (Of Telling Me He Loves Me)
- The Holy Hills of Heaven Calls Me
- Then You Can Walk With Me
- There Is No Darkness In Him
- There's Nothing My God Can't Do (co-written with Jimmie Davis)(Vestal Goodman)
- They Didn't Take Him To Calvary
- Things Are Gonna Be Better After While
- Things I Learned At Mother's Knee, The
- This Is My Father's World
- This Is My Valley
- This Little Sheep's Coming Home
- Til There's A Mountain To Move
- Tiny
- Tiny Angel
- Today Is Tomorrow's Yesterday
- Tomorrow I May Be Home
- Too Much To Gain To Lose (Connie Smith, The Talleys, Vestal Goodman)
- Touch Of Mama's Hand, The
- Touch Through Me
- Touched With His Love
- Traveling Man
- Troubles Can Break You (Or Make You A Man)

== U ==
- Unlock My Mind, Take Back My Memories
- Unmerited Favor Of God (The Talleys)
- Until He Comes

== W ==
- Wait For An Answer
- Waiting For The Son To Come on Down
- Wars May Make Heroes (But Heroes Will Never Make War)
- Was There Any Music
- We Are Like Children (Lord Teach Us)
- We Don't Have As Far To Go
- We Shall Behold Him (Sandi Patty)
- We're The Generation
- West Kentucky Coalmines
- We've Weathered Storms Before
- What Can I Offer The Lord
- What Will It Be Beyond The River
- When All Goes Well
- When His Kingdom Comes (Steve Green)
- When I Lift Up My Head (Gaither Homecoming)
- When Is He Coming Again
- When Payday Comes
- When We All Shall Gather There
- Where Did All The Good Folks Go
- Where Goes The Wind
- Which Road Leads To Heaven
- Who's Gonna Teach My Children's Children
- Whole World Is A Vineyard, The
- Whole World Is Singing, The
- Wonder If Anyone Cares At All
- World Needs Some Good News Bad, The
- World's Gonna Know We've Been Here
- Wounds Of Calvary, The

== Y–Z ==
- You Were My Way Back Home
- You Will Have To Live The Song
- You're Never There
- Zacchæus
