= Gaither Homecoming =

Gospel music media series

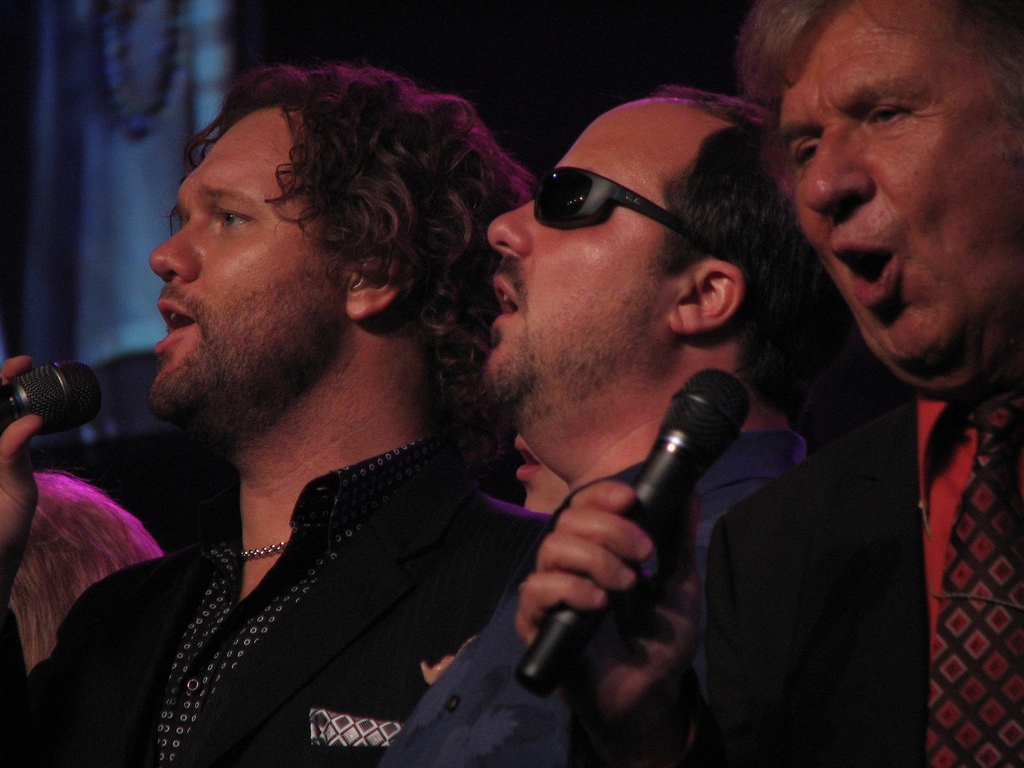
David Phelps, Gordon Mote, Bill Gaither (left to right) in April 2009

Gaither Homecoming is the name applied to a series of videos, music recordings and concerts, which are organized, promoted and usually presented by Christian music songwriter and impresario Bill Gaither.

== Beginnings ==
On February 19, 1991, the Gaither Vocal Band had just wrapped up a recording session in a Nashville, Tennessee, working on an album called Homecoming, which featured many of the great voices of southern gospel music: The Speers, The Gatlins, Jake Hess, The Cathedrals, Howard & Vestal Goodman, Buck Rambo, Eva Mae LeFevre, James Blackwood, Hovie Lister, Jim Hill, and J.D. Sumner & The Stamps. After the session, the artists stayed around to chat, swap stories and sing old standards around the piano. The impromptu session was recorded on video and later published. The recording was so well received that Gaither began a series of professionally produced videos with larger gatherings of gospel musicians.

== Format ==
The format for almost all of the videos in the series is very similar. A studio set or concert stage is home to a group of several dozen singers, with the front row featuring artists with longstanding and legendary careers in Southern Gospel music. They would be joined by younger artists, some of them up-and-coming acts in the Gaither Music Group publishing stable. Gaither would lead the group in several songs, with soloists and groups featured in additional songs. Comments by veteran singers, who would reminisce about their careers, are a staple of the series. In later videos, the inevitability of death found its way into the videos, as segments remembering artists who had died since the previous taping were featured.

Most videos also have accompanying CDs which can be purchased in a set or separately.

The videos and CDs regularly top sales charts, even many years after the series' inception and after the death of many favorite artists. The most recent videos, Gaither Homecoming Tour: Live From Toronto and Canadian Homecoming, were first and third, respectively, on Billboard's music video chart, and the companion CDs also hit the CCM charts. More recently, the 2007 recording of "How Great Thou Art" was nominated for a Dove Award.

== Concert series ==
In 1996, the video series gave birth to a concert tour, with a format similar to the videos but usually performed "in the round" in arenas. The concert dates are normally on Fridays and Saturdays, usually in separate cities.

In 2004, the Gaither Homecoming concert tour ranked 16th in Pollstar rankings of all tours, beating out pop music heavyweights such as Elton John, Fleetwood Mac and Rod Stewart.

== Television series ==
Many of the video series have been repackaged into a series of hour-long or half-hour-long television shows (similar to an infomercial). They can be found on the following Christian or family-oriented cable/satellite channels. (There is also an Internet TV channel – gaither.tv)

In the U.S.

- Christian Television Network (CTN)
- PBS (titled Classic Gospel)
- RFD-TV
- TBN (titled Precious Memories)
- TCT
- Total Living Network (TLN)
- Heartland
- UplifTV

In Canada

- CTS
- Grace TV
- Miracle Channel
- VisionTV

== Cruises ==
The Gaither Homecoming series has branched out into twice-yearly cruises. One cruise normally sails to Alaska in September, and the other to tropical ports in February.

It was on one of these cruises, in 2006, where regular pianist Anthony Burger, a longtime favorite of the Homecoming series, collapsed on-stage as a result of a heart attack while accompanying Gaither, his wife Gloria and the rest of the Homecoming Friends.

In 2009, for the first time, a Homecoming cruise was recorded for DVD/CD releases. Alaskan Cruise Homecoming and Majesty were released in January 2011.

== Videography ==
- 1991: Homecoming
- 1992: A Praise Gathering
- 1992: Reunion
- 1993: Turn Your Radio On
- 1993: Old Friends
- 1994: A Christmas Homecoming
- 1994: Landmark
- 1994: Precious Memories
- 1995: All Day Singin' with Dinner on the Ground
- 1995: The Sweetest Song I Know
- 1995: Revival
- 1995: Holy Ground
- 1995: Ryman Gospel Reunion
- 1996: When All God's Singers Get Home
- 1996: Sunday Meetin' Time
- 1996: Sing Your Blues Away
- 1996: Moments To Remember
- 1996: Something Beautiful
- 1996: Homecoming Texas Style
- 1996: Joy To The World
- 1996: Joy in the Camp
- 1997: This Is My Story
- 1997: Feelin' At Home
- 1998: Singin' With The Saints
- 1998: Down By The Tabernacle
- 1998: Rivers Of Joy
- 1998: Hawaiian Homecoming
- 1998: Marching To Zion
- 1998: Atlanta Homecoming (at the Georgia Dome in Atlanta)
- 1998: All Day Singin' At The Dome
- 1999: Singin' In My Soul
- 1999: So Glad!
- 1999: Sweet, Sweet Spirit
- 1999: Kennedy Center Homecoming
- 1999: Mountain Homecoming (Blue Ridge Mountains)
- 1999: I'll Meet You on the Mountain
- 2000: Good News
- 2000: Memphis Homecoming
- 2000: Oh, My Glory!
- 2000: Harmony in the Heartland
- 2000: Irish Homecoming (in Belfast)
- 2000: Whispering Hope
- 2000: Christmas in the Country
- 2001: Christmas... A Time for Joy
- 2001: What a Time! (filmed in 1999)
- 2001: London Homecoming
- 2001: A Billy Graham Music Homecoming, Vol. 1 & 2
- 2001: Journey to the Sky [certified gold] (filmed in 2001).
- 2001: Passin' the Faith Along [certified gold] (filmed in 2001).
- 2002: Freedom Band (filmed in 2001)
- 2002: I'll Fly Away(filmed in 2000)
- 2002: New Orleans Homecoming(fimed in 2000)
- 2002: God Bless America (at Carnegie Hall) (filmed in 2002)
- 2002: Let Freedom Ring (at Carnegie Hall) (filmed in 2002)
- 2003: Going Home [certified platinum]
- 2003: Heaven
- 2003: Australian Homecoming
- 2003: Red Rocks Homecoming (filmed in 2001)
- 2003: Rocky Mountain Homecoming(filmed in 2001)
- 2003: A Gospel Bluegrass Homecoming, Vol. 1 & 2
- 2004: Build a Bridge (at The Potter's House in Dallas, Texas) (filmed in 2003)
- 2004: We Will Stand (at The Potter's House) (filmed in 2003)
- 2005: Church In The Wildwood [certified platinum] (filmed in 2001)
- 2005: Hymns [certified platinum] (filmed in 2001)
- 2005: The Best of Guy Penrod
- 2005: A Tribute to George Younce
- 2005: Israel Homecoming [certified platinum]
- 2005: Jerusalem Homecoming [certified platinum]
- 2006: Canadian Homecoming [certified gold]
- 2006: Live from Toronto [certified gold]
- 2006: Christmas in South Africa
- 2006: Homecoming Christmas – Live From South Africa
- 2007: South African Homecoming
- 2007: Love Can Turn The World – Live From South Africa
- 2007: Amazing Grace [certified gold]
- 2007: How Great Thou Art [certified gold]
- 2008: A Campfire Homecoming
- 2008: Homecoming Picnic
- 2008: Rock of Ages
- 2008: Country Bluegrass Homecoming, Vol. 1 & 2
- 2009: Nashville Homecoming (at the Grand Ole Opry stage)
- 2009: Joy in My Heart
- 2010: Giving Thanks
- 2010: Count Your Blessings
- 2011: Alaskan Homecoming (cruise) (filmed in 2009)
- 2011: Majesty (Alaskan cruise) (filmed in 2009)
- 2011: Tent Revival Homecoming (at the Billy Graham Library)
- 2011: The Old Rugged Cross (at the Billy Graham Library)
- 2012: Gaither Homecoming Celebration (filmed in new year of 1998, never-before-seen material)
- 2013: Women of Homecoming, Vol: 1 & 2
- 2016: Circuit Rider
- 2017: Give the World a Smile
- 2017: Sweeter as the Days Go By
- 2020: The Longer I Serve Him
- 2021: Glorious Church (filmed in 2001, never-before-seen material)
- 2023: Power In The Blood (filmed in 2022)
- 2023: Hallelujah Homecoming (filmed in 2022)
- 2025: Sweet Hymns Of Fellowship (filmed in 2024)
- 2025: Heavenly Love: A Southern Convention Sing-Along (filmed in 2024)
- 2026: I Go To The Rock (filmed in September 2025)
- 2026: You Are Loved: A Tribute to the Songs of Bill & Gloria Gaither

== Featured artists ==
Numbers indicate the number of videos in which the artist has appeared as a featured performer.

- Acoustix (2007–)
- Alvin Slaughter (2004)
- Amber Nelon Kistler (2000–2024) 7 (d. July 26, 2024)
- Amy Grant (2013) 2
- Andraé Crouch (1999–2015) (d. Jan. 8, 2015)
- Ann Downing (1992–)
- Anthony Burger (1994–2006) (d. Feb. 22, 2006)
- Avalon (2001–)
- Ben Speer (1992–2017) (d. April 7, 2017)
- The Blackwood Brothers (2000–)
- The Booth Brothers (2002–) 14
- Boots Randolph+ (2004-2007) (d. July 3, 2007)
- Brenda Lee (2007)
- Brock Speer+ (1991-1999) (d. March 19, 1999)
- Buddy Greene (1994–) 31
- Calvin Newton (1994–2023) 5 (d. March 3, 2023)
- Carman (1998) (d. Feb. 21, 2021)
- The Cathedrals (1991–1999) 9
- CeCe Winans (2001–) 2
- Cherryholmes (2008–) 3
- Chonda Pierce (1998–) 2
- Chris Blue (2023-) 2
- Cliff Barrows (2001) 3 (d. Nov. 15, 2016)
- The Crabb Family (2001–) 7
- Cynthia Clawson (1995–) 20
- Dallas Holm (1995–) 3
- Danny Gaither (1993–2000) 4 (d. April 6, 2001)
- David Phelps (1998–) 30
- Don Francisco (2001)
- Dottie Rambo (1992–2008) 5 (d. May 11, 2008)
- Doug Anderson (2006-)
- Doyle Lawson and Quicksilver (1999–) 3
- Earl Weatherford (1992*) (d. June 17, 1992)
- Ernie Haase (1996–) 9
- Ernie Haase & Signature Sound (2005–) 16
- Evie (1996–2001) 4
- Fairfield Four (1993)
- Florida Boys (1994–) 8
- Gaither Vocal Band (1991–) 67
- Gatlin Brothers (1991–) 7
- Gene McDonald (1998–) 24
- George Beverly Shea (2001–2011) 4 (d. April 16, 2013)
- George Jones (2008) 2 (d. April 26, 2013)
- George Younce (1991–2005) 25 (d. April 11, 2005)
- Glen Payne (1991–1999) 10 (d. October 15, 1999)
- Gloria Gaither (1991–) 29
- Gold City (1998–) 3
- Gordon Mote (2007–) 12
- Greater Vision (2000–) 5
- Guy Penrod (1995–) 38
- Harold Lane (1992-1998) (d. June 6, 2011)
- Henry Slaughter (1996) (d. Nov. 13, 2020)
- Hoppers, The (1993–) 21
- Hovie Lister (1991–2002) 8 (d. Dec. 28, 2001)
- Howard Goodman (1991–2002) 17 (d. Nov. 30, 2002)
- The Isaacs (1996–) 41
- Ivan Parker (1995–) 31
- J. D. Sumner (1991–1999) 18 (d. Nov. 16, 1998)
- Jake Hess (1991–2004) 39 (d. Jan. 4, 2004)
- James Blackwood (1991–2002) 10 (d. Feb. 3, 2002)
- Jamie Grace (2013) 2
- Janet Paschal (1993–) 26
- Jason Crabb (2001–) 14
- Jeff & Sheri Easter (1994–) 33
- Jessy Dixon (1996–2008) 46 (d. Sept. 26, 2011)
- Jimmy Fortune (2008–) 2
- Johnny Cook (1993) 2 (d. May 14, 2000)
- Johnny Minick (1996–) 11
- Jonathan Pierce (1996–1997) 3 (d. May 10, 2020)
- Karen Peck and New River (1998–) 11
- Karen Wheaton (1996–) 4
- Katinas, The (1999–) 2
- Kelly Nelon (1993–2024) 3 (d. July 26, 2024)
- Kingsmen Quartet (1998–) 2
- Labreeska Hemphill (1993-2013) d. Dec. 9, 2015)
- Larnelle Harris (1994–) 20
- Larry Gatlin (1991–) 7
- Legacy Five (2001–) 6
- Lily Fern Weatherford (1992–) 5
- Lynda Randle (1996–) 31
- Mark Lowry (1991–) 39
- Marshall Hall (2000–) 15
- The Martins (1995–) 26
- Mary Tom Speer Reid (1995–2014) 11 (d. Sept. 16, 2014)
- Meadowlark Lemon (1999–) 2 (d. Dec. 27, 2015)
- Michael English (1991–) 19
- Michael W. Smith (2001) 2
- Mylon LeFevre (1992–2023) 3 (d. Sept. 8, 2023)
- Naomi Sego (1993-2009) (d. Nov. 3, 2017)
- Natalie Grant (2002–) 3
- The Nelons (1995–2024) 12
- Nitty Gritty Dirt Band (2008)
- Oak Ridge Boys (2002–) 6
- Old Time Gospel Hour Quartet (2004)
- The Peasall Sisters (2005)
- Perrys, The (2009)
- Ralph Stanley (2003–2008) 4 (d. June 23, 2016)
- Randy Owen (2007–) 2
- Randy Travis (2001–) 3
- Reba Rambo-McGuire (1994–) 3
- Rex Nelon (1994–2000) 16 (d. Jan. 24, 2000)
- Ricky Skaggs (2001)
- Russ Taff (1992–) 33
- Sandi Patty (1999–2024) 12
- Sherman Andrus (2002–) 2
- Sonya Isaacs (1996–) 17
- Speer Family (1991–) 6
- Squire Parsons (1993–) 18
- Stamps Quartet (1991–) 6
- Stan Whitmire (2004–) 3
- Statesmen Quartet (1996–2001) 2
- Statler Brothers (1990)
- Steve Green (2010)
- The Old Friends Quartet (2000-2002) 3
- Talley Trio (2000–) 14
- Taylor Mason (2002–) 3
- Terry Blackwood (1995–) 33
- Terry McMillan (1998–) 2 (d. Feb. 2, 2007)
- Testify (2000 -2004)
- Tim Duncan (2005-)
- Tim Parton (1996–) 3
- Tim Riley (2000)
- Tramaine Hawkins (2004–) 2
- Vestal Goodman (1991–2003) 38 (d. Dec. 27, 2003)
- Voices of Lee (2006)
- Wes Hampton (2007–) 8
- Wesley Pritchard (1996–) 43
- Wintley Phipps (2001–) 6
- Woody Wright (1998–) 20
- Zig Ziglar (2001) (d. Nov. 28, 2012)
