= LaBreeska Hemphill =

American singer

- Born: LaBreeska Rogers; February 4, 1940; Flat Creek, Alabama, U.S.
- Died: December 9, 2015 (aged 75); Nashville, Tennessee, U.S.
- Occupation: Southern gospel performer
- Spouse: Joel Hemphill
- Children: 2 sons, 1 daughter
- Relatives: Rusty Goodman (uncle); Sam Goodman (uncle); Howard Goodman (uncle); Joey and Trent (sons)

LaBreeska Hemphill (February 4, 1940 - December 9, 2015) was an American Southern gospel performer. She was a member of The Happy Goodman Family and The Hemphills. With her husband and children, she won eight GMA Dove Awards and three BMI Awards, and she was inducted into the Dollywood Gospel Hall of Fame and the Delta Music Museum Hall of Fame.

== Early life ==
Hemphill was born in 1940 in Flat Creek, Alabama. Her father was Walter Erskine Rogers and her mother, Gussie Mae Goodman.

== Career ==
Hemphill started performing Southern gospel music with her parents as part of The Happy Goodman Family in childhood. They performed at the Ryman Auditorium in Nashville, Tennessee, in 1949.

Hemphill and her husband began performing Southern gospel together at the Living Way Apostolic Church in West Monroe, Louisiana. They later pastored a Pentecostal church in Bastrop, Louisiana. They released their first record as The Hemphills through Canaan Records in 1966. They were active from the 1970s to the 1990s. Over the course of their career, they released over 20 records. Hemphill sang hit songs like He's Still Working On Me, I Claim the Blood, Grandma's Rocking Chair, and Unfinished Task. The band won eight GMA Dove Awards and three BMI Awards of Excellence. They were inducted into the Dollywood Gospel Hall of Fame and the Delta Music Museum Hall of Fame.

Hemphill authored four books, including a memoir about her husband in 2012.

== Personal life and death ==
Hemphill married Joel Hemphill in 1957. Her father-in-law, W. T. Hemphill, was the founder of the Living Way Apostolic Church. They had two sons, Joey and Trent, and a daughter, Candy. They resided in Joelton, a neighborhood of Nashville, Tennessee.

Hemphill died on December 9, 2015, in Nashville, Tennessee, at 75. Her funeral was held in West Monroe, Louisiana.

== Selected works ==
- Hemphill, LaBreeska (1976). LaBreeska: An Autobiography. Nashville, Tennessee: Hemphill Music Co. ISBN 9780960094813. OCLC 2372275.
- Hemphill, LaBreeska (2001). The Hemphills, Partners in Emotion : The Story of Joel and LaBreeska Hemphill. Camp Hill, Pennsylvania: Horizon Books. ISBN 9780889652033. OCLC 50283564.
- Hemphill, LaBreeska (2009). My Daddy Played the Guitar. Joelton, Tennessee: Trumpet Call Books. ISBN 9780967175683. OCLC 495846911.
- Hemphill, LaBreeska (2012). Can Anything Good Come Out of Bawcomville?. Joelton, Tennessee: Trumpet Call Books.
