= Wasted Years (disambiguation) =

"Wasted Years" is an Iron Maiden song

Wasted Years may also refer to:

- Wasted Years, a 1960 album by Sons of Song
- Wasted Years, a 2001 compilation album of The Sensational Nightingales
- Wasted Years (album), a 2014 album by Off!
- Wasted Years, a 2012 album by Infinity (band)
- "Wasted Years" (Wally Fowler song), gospel song
- "Wasted Years", a song by Maroon 5, from the album Live – Friday the 13th
- "Wasted Years", a song by Joe Cocker, from the 1978 album Luxury You Can Afford
