= Jennings Harold Lane =

American Southern Gospel music musician

- Also known as: Harold Lane
- Born: February 1, 1929; Huntington, West Virginia
- Died: June 11, 2011 (aged 82) Nashville, Tennessee
- Genres: Southern Gospel
- Formerly of: The Gospel Harmony Boys; Speer Family

Jennings Harold Lane, professionalized as Harold Lane, was an American southern gospel singer, songwriter, and arranger who is best known for his 22-year tenure as the tenor vocalist for the gospel group the Speer Family. He was inducted into the Southern Gospel Museum and Hall of Fame in 2009.

== Early life ==
Lane was born in Huntington, West Virginia, to Curtis William and Cassie Simpkins Lane. He graduated from Marshall University in 1954 with a master's degree in music.

== Career ==
Lane began his career with the The Gospel Harmony Boys, a group he co-founded, singing lead from 1953 to 1955 and again from 1956 to 1967, with an interval performing with the Homeland Harmony Quartet.

Following the 1966 death of Speer Family patriarch G. T. "Dad" Speer, Brock Speer, recruited Lane, to join as tenor singer and arranger. Lane joined the Speer Family in 1967 and remained with the group for about 22 years, a tenure that coincided with the group's commercial peak.

As a songwriter, Lane wrote numerous Southern gospel songs, including "Thank You, Lord" (popularized by the Couriers), "Touring That City" (a number-one hit for the Inspirations in 1973), and "I'm Standing on the Solid Rock," a major hit for both the Speers and the Florida Boys. He also arranged music for other prominent gospel acts, including the Florida Boys, The Rambos, Jake Hess, The LeFevres, and Bill Gaither.

Beyond performing and songwriting, Lane taught at several music schools, including the Stamps-Baxter School of Music and the Ben Speer School of Music, wrote instructional columns on music theory for Singing News, edited church hymnals, and published a six-volume series titled 500 Hymns for Instruments.

He was inducted into the Southern Gospel Museum and Hall of Fame in 2009.

== Death ==
Lane died on June 6, 2011, in Nashville, Tennessee, at age 82.
