= Wally Fowler =

American singer

- Also known as: The Man with a Million Friends
- Born: John Wallace Fowler; February 15, 1917
- Origin: Adairsville, Georgia, US
- Died: June 3, 1994 (aged 77)
- Genres: Gospel, country
- Occupation: singer, songwriter
- Years active: 1935–1985
- Labels: 4 Star Records, Decca, Starday, Pickwick, Dove, King, Nashwood
- Formerly of: The Georgia Clodhoppers; The Oak Ridge Quartet; Tennessee Valley Boys

John Wallace "Wally" Fowler (February 15, 1917 – June 3, 1994) was an American Southern gospel music singer, manager, and music promoter and businessman. He founded the Oak Ridge Quartet, a gospel act that eventually became the Oak Ridge Boys; and popularized all-night gospel sings. An accomplished songwriter in both the country music and gospel fields, Fowler's composition "Wasted Years" became a gospel music standard. He was known as The Man with a Million Friends and Mr. Gospel Music.

== Personal life ==
Born near Adairsville, Georgia, Fowler's father was the cotton king of Bartow County, Georgia until the Great Depression left him broken both in health and financially.

He then struck out on his own, forming a country music group, Wally Fowler and the Georgia Clodhoppers, which included Chet Atkins on lead guitar. They performed on WNOX-AM in Knoxville, Tennessee and became regulars on Mid-day Merry Go Round. Fowler later formed his Harmony Quartet, which sang in weekly concerts for children at nearby Oak Ridge, which led to Fowler renaming the group the Oak Ridge Quartet. The group consisted of himself, Lon "Deacon" Freeman, Curly Kinsey and Johnny New.

Fowler moved to Nashville, and from 1946 to 1950 became a regular part of The Prince Albert Show segment of the Grand Ole Opry on NBC Radio. In 1948, he launched his first all-night gospel sing, popularizing a format that would blanket the South over the next two decades. Originating from Nashville's historic Ryman Auditorium and later taken to other major cities across the region, each show featured many of the day's premier Southern gospel quartets.

In the 1950s, he hosted a syndicated television program, The Wally Fowler Show, featuring Wendy Bagwell and the Sunliters, The Speers, The Statesmen and others. He recorded for several labels, but in later years, went into semi-retirement and tended to avoid publicity, although he continued to promote some gospel and variety shows in North Carolina.

== Death and legacy ==
On June 3, 1994, Fowler apparently suffered a heart attack while fishing from a dock on Dale Hollow Lake, northeast of Nashville, and his body was found floating in the water. He was survived by his widow, Judy Moss Fowler, and daughters Faith McCoy (married to Larry McCoy) and Hope Kimmer (married to Joel Kimmer. A daughter later in life, Michelle Fowler Martinez, and his grandchildren, Jody McCoy, Jamie McCoy and Jeremy McCoy, Missy Doughty and Gregg Kimmer.
