= Rosa Speer =

Rosa Nell Speer Powell
- Born: Rosa Nell Speer; September 22, 1922; Double Springs, Alabama, U.S.
- Died: May 16, 2017 (aged 94) Winchester, Tennessee, U.S.
- Genres: Christian, Southern Gospel
- Occupation: Singer
- Instruments: Vocals, Piano
- Years active: 1920s-1948 (as member of the Speer Family); 1980s-1997 (limited Speer Family appearances); 1991-2009 (singer with Gaither Homecoming Series)

Rosa Nell Powell (née Speer; September 22, 1922 – May 16, 2017) was an American southern gospel singer who sang with the well-known Speer Family. She was born in Double Springs, Alabama, the second child (and oldest daughter) of George Thomas "GT" Speer and Lena (née Brock) Speer (known to most people in Southern gospel music as "Dad" and "Mom" Speer), who led and helped found the family group.

Speer began singing with the group at age 3, and eventually became the singing group's pianist. Along with her parents, she performed with her brothers, Jackson Brock and Ben Lacy, and sister, Mary Tom. She continued to perform with the group/family until 1948, when she left to get married. Eventually Speer-Powell would return decades later to perform sporadically with the group (till its end in 1997), and sometimes with the Gaither Homecoming Series as well. Speer was inducted into the Southern Gospel Music Association Hall of Fame in 2005.

== Personal life ==
Speer married Edwin Powell in 1948. He died in May, 1979.

== Death ==
Speer-Powell died on May 16, 2017. She was 94 years old. A pioneer of the Gaither homecoming, she left behind 3 kids and grandkids.
