= The Gospel Harmony Boys =

American Southern gospel quartet

- Origin: Huntington, West Virginia
- Genres: Christian, Southern Gospel
- Years active: 1952–present
- Label: Harmony Productions

The Gospel Harmony Boys are a southern gospel quartet.

== History ==
In 1952, Jennings Harold Lane founded The Gospel Harmony Boys, in Huntington, West Virginia. The original lineup consisted of Harold Lane on lead, Leonard Adams on tenor, J. B. Short on bass, and John Embry on baritone, with Carlos Day serving as the group's first regular pianist.

The quartet was an early adopter of television as a performance medium, beginning one of America's first gospel music television programs in 1953, airing every Sunday for over 17 years on WSAZ-TV. In April 1956, the Gospel Harmony Boys appeared on NBC's Today Show with host Dave Garroway.

Lane briefly left the group in 1956 to perform with Conner Hall and the Homeland Harmony Quartet, returning to the Gospel Harmony Boys in 1957. He later departed again in 1967 to join the Speer Family, replacing the group's founding patriarch, Dad Speer.

The group disbanded in 2002 and later reformed in 2004.
