= Testify (Christian band) =

American band

Testify (Christian Band)
- Brent Swanner, Kenneth Swanner, Landon Thompson

Background information
- Origin: Louisiana
- Genres: CCM, southern gospel, adult contemporary
- Occupations: Singers, musicians
- Years active: 1995 - 2012
- Labels: SonSound, SonSound Masterpiece, Chapel
- Past members: Brent Swanner Kenneth Swanner Landon Thompson Daniel Steele Philip Bergeron Nathan Thompson

Testify was a Southern Gospel/Contemporary Christian vocal band founded by two brothers, Kenneth Swanner and Brent Swanner in 1995. The band performed at the Southern Baptist Convention, multiple State Baptist Conventions, Gaither Homecoming Concerts, Chick-fil-a Corporate Headquarters, Theaters in Branson, at TBN, the Grand Ole Opry, GMT and in Nashville for a concert at Lifeway Christian Resource Center of the Southern Baptist Convention. In October 2001 Testify performed at the Roy Acuff Theater for the "Heal Our Land Benefit Concert" for the victims of 9/11.

== History ==
Brent and Kenneth Swanner grew up in a musical family and started singing at an early age. Both were heavily involved in their church and school music programs. Out of college, Kenneth joined The Continental Singers and toured several years all over the world. Meanwhile, while Brent was performing in a school musical, he was discovered by Waine Self, founder of the Southern Gospel group, Higher Kingdom In 1994, Brent and Kenneth collaborated at a Youth Evangelism Conference and "Testify" was born. Brent and Kenneth officially formed "Testify" in February 1995. After months of concerts with just the two of them they added an old college buddy, Daniel Steele to sing the baritone. They recorded an Independent, Self Titled album at a local studio in 1995. In 1996 Testify won The Albert E Brumley Memorial Gospel Singing Contest in Springdale, AR. A year later Daniel Steele moved to bass and Philip Bergeron took over the baritone. In the meantime, Testify signed with Son Sound Music Group and recorded, Testify Self Titled, produced by Danny Funderburk of The Cathedral Quartet fame. Testify then released their first single ever, "Jesus Left Heaven for Me" and garnered major radio play and some chart success. In 1997, Son Sound Music Group promoted Testify to their major label, Son Sound Masterpiece and Testify recorded Ready to Serve, produced by Danny Funderburk and Lari Goss.

In 1999, Landon Thompson joined the group and Testify began working with Grammy Award nominee and Dove Award winning producer, Michael Sykes. Michael produced two recordings for Testify. They are called, Something Worth Living For and Keep Walking. Something Worth Living For included Testify's first ever Top 40 song, "He's Still Keeping Me". Testify and Michael Sykes second collaboration, Keep Walking, produced Testify's first Top 10 single, "Doubter To A Shouter".

In 2004, with the release of The Highest Call, Testify changed their overall sound. In an effort to keep pushing the creative limits of the group, Testify enlisted Buddy Mullins, former member of The Mullins, The Gaither Vocal Band and Sunday Drive to produce. The first single from The Highest Call, "All It Takes Is A Shout", immediately entered the Top 40 on The Singing News chart. Testify's next single from The Highest Call, "In God We Trust", prompted a letter from then President, George W. Bush, to write Testify a letter thanking them for such a timely song. With the success of The Highest Call, Testify was nominated for the 2005 Diamond Award Trio of the Year and SGM Awards Trio of the Year. In addition to The Highest Call, Buddy Mullins went on to produce two more Testify recordings, Rhythm of Grace and Shine on Us. Rhythm of Grace included another Top 40 song, "That's Why He Came". Buddy's influence and comradery with the guys was undeniable. He became an honorary member of the group filling in for Kenneth Swanner at lead vocals when needed.

== The Farewell Tour ==
In 2012, Brent and Kenneth Swanner reevaluated the future of the ministry. After close to eighteen years together, Brent and Kenneth decide to announce their Farewell Tour. On November 17, 2012, they performed their final concert at First West (First Baptist Church West Monroe, LA), the city where Testify's 18-year journey first started. At that concert, various individuals (including family members, record producers, management, former members and Buddy Mullins contributions to Testify's ministry. Several former members and Buddy Mullins performed with Testify. To commemorate the Farewell Tour, Testify recorded their 13th and final album, Songs We Love to honor their Southern Gospel and CCM influences.

== Life after Testify ==
Brent Swanner recorded a solo album in 2013, And the Story Goes On. In 2020 a single was released in honor of his youngest son, "The First Time Ever I Saw Your Face". Brent currently manages a construction company in West Monroe, LA. Kenneth Swanner works at a bank in North Louisiana and is a pastor at a local church. Landon Thompson is a worship leader at a church in Houston, Texas.

=== Studio albums ===
Year	Album	Record label	Record producer
1996	Testify - Self Titled		
1997	Testify - Self Titled	Son Sound	Danny Funderburk
1998	Ready To Serve	SonSound Masterpiece	Danny Funderburk, Lari Goss
1999	Something Worth Living For	Chapel	Michael Sykes
2001	Keep Walking	Chapel	Michael Sykes
2003	The Highest Call	Independent	Buddy Mullins
2005	Rhythm of Grace	Independent	Buddy Mullins
2009	Shine On Us	Independent	Buddy Mullins, Brent Swanner
2012	Songs We Love	Independent	Brent Swanner

=== Compilations ===
Year	Album	Record label
2005	10th Anniversary	Independent
2010	Greatest Hits	Independent

=== Live albums ===
Year	Album	Record label	Producer
2010	A Night of Southern Gospel	Independent	Gary McSpadden

=== Singles ===
Year	Title	Peak positions		Album
Year	Title	Singing News	Gospel Voice	Album
1997	"Jesus Left Heaven For Me"	63	—	Testify
1997	"Isn't It Just Like Him"	57	—	Testify
1997	"Someone Believed"	52	—	Testify
1998	"This Little Child"	43	—	Ready to Serve
1998	"This Love"	44	—	Ready to Serve
1998	"Do You Know that You Know"	65	—	Ready to Serve
1998	"Walking in the Light"	48	—	Ready to Serve
1999	"He’s Still Keeping Me"	34	15	Something Worth Living For
1999	"When I Lift Up My Head"	37	17	Something Worth Living For
1999	"Three Nails, Three Days"	44	12	Something Worth Living For
2001	"The Sweet Forever"	71	33	Keep Walking
2001	"Doubter to a Shouter"	9	2	Keep Walking
2001	"Starting Now"	41	—	Keep Walking
2003	"In God We Trust"	11	7	The Highest Call
2003	"All It Takes Is A Shout"	40	6	The Highest Call
2004	"Shine On"	37	12	The Highest Call
2005	"That's Why He Came"	28	2	Rhythm of Grace
2005	"Glory Road"	47	—	Rhythm of Grace
2009	"I Will Follow You"	66	—	Rhythm of Grace
2009	"You are God Alone"	53	—	Worship: Shine On Us
2010	"I Bowed On My Knees"	37	—	Live: A Night of Southern Gospel
2010	"The Highest Call"	70	—	Live: A Night of Southern Gospel
2013	"In God We Trust"	17	—	Testify: Greatest Hits
2013	"Doubter to a Shouter"	31	—	Testify: Greatest Hits
