= Ann Downing =

American singer

- Born: Virginia Ann Sanders Downing; June 12, 1945 (age 81); Pittsboro, Mississippi, U.S.
- Occupations: Singer, speaker
- Known for: The Speer Family, The Downings, Gaither Homecoming
- Spouse: Paul Shirley Downing Jr. (1968 - 1991, his death)
- Awards: GMA Dove Award for Female Vocalist Of The Year (1970) Singing News Fan Awards Favorite Female Singer (1973) GMA Hall Of Fame (1998; As part of the Speer Family) SGMA Hall Of Fame (2018)
- Website: https://www.anndowning.com/

Virginia Ann Sanders Downing (born June 12, 1945) is an American singer of southern gospel music and an inspirational speaker.

== Early years ==
Born in Pittsboro, Mississippi, Downing is the daughter of Earnest and Lillie Sanders. She grew up on a farm in Calhoun County, near Bruce, Mississippi, and was 12 years younger than her only sibling, sister Lavern. As a youngster, she sang at church services and social events in the community. Before her 1963 graduation from Bruce High School, she had a successful audition with the Speer Family southern gospel group.

== Career ==
=== Speer Family ===
Downing began singing with the Speers when she was 18 and stayed with them for five years, during which she participated in more than 1,000 performances and was especially known for her treatments of "I Must Tell Jesus" and "On the Sunny Banks". In 1968, she left the group to marry Paul Shirley Downing Jr., who had been a bass singer with The Dixie Echoes gospel group but had become a corporate sales trainer.

=== The Downings ===
Later in 1968, her husband suggested forming their own group, and in the spring of 1969, The Downings debuted with a performance at Bruce High School. In the summer of 1969, The Downings (described in the trade publication Billboard as "an unusually young gospel group") toured with Jimmie Davis and The Chuck Wagon Gang. Eighteen of the group's recordings reached top-20 gospel songs ranking before the group disbanded in 1978. In 1970, Downing won the second Dove Award for Female Vocalist of the Year.

=== Later ministries ===
Following the end of the singing group, Paul and Ann Downing focused on other ministries. In 1991, while the couple was in Kentucky for an engagement, he had a heart attack, and he died about two months later. She became a solo artist after her husband's death, when she completed the tour that the couple had begun. She also continued working on plans that the couple had started for creation of the Middle Tennessee Women's Retreat. She was host of the first retreat in May 1992. She became a regular performer on Gaither Homecoming videos and has appeared on the Family Channel, TBN, and TNN television networks. In May 1999 Downing landed a spot #8 spot on the Singing News Radio Airplay Chart with her song "Climbing Jacobs Ladder" from her 1999 album Oceans of Grace. It was the #25 song on the Singing New Charts for 1999.

In 2020, Downing had a full schedule that mixed speaking engagements (including events for women's groups and senior adult groups) and church concerts not only in the United States and Canada, but also in some European countries. Topics on which she speaks to groups include dealing with loss of a spouse, trauma in a family, fading success, and financial ruin. She also is the author of a book, Skidmarks on the Road of Life. Downing released her latest album Step By Step in 2021, it features a collection of songs most of which were co-written by Downing.

In 1998, Downing was inducted into the Gospel Music Association Hall Of Fame as part of the Speer Family. In 2018, Downing was inducted into the Southern Gospel Music Association Hall of Fame.

== Discography ==
Title	Details
I Must Tell Jesus (Later Re-issued as Personally on Discovery Downing Records)	Released: 1979; Label: Koala Records; Formats: LP
4	Released: 1989; Label: Custom; Formats: Cassette
Treasured Gifts	Released: 1992; Label: Welcome Home Records; Formats: Cassette
Sheltered	Released: 1995; Label: Whitefield Music; Formats: Cassette, CD
The Longer I Serve Him The Sweeter He Grows	Released: 1996; Label: Daywind Records; Formats: CD
Let's Talk	Released: 1997; Label: Daywind Records; Formats: CD
Ocean Of Grace	Released: 1999; Label: White Field Music; Formats: CD
My Homecoming Memories	Released: 2000; Label: Custom; Formats: CD
Movin' In Me	Released: 2001; Label: Song Garden Records; Formats: CD
Tell Me Again Live	Released: 2003; Label: Scarlett Song Records; Formats: DVD, CD
God Looking In	Released: 2004; Label: Scarlett Song Records; Formats: CD
All About The People	Released: 2006; Label: Scarlett Song Records; Formats: DVD, CD
Yuletide	Released: 2007; Label: Crossroads; Formats: CD
Traveling Light	Released: 2010; Label: Custom; Formats: CD
Sing Your Way To Joy	Released: 2012; Label: Gospel Heritage Records; Formats: CD
Statements Of My Faith	Released: 2013; Label: Scarlett Song Records; Formats: CD
Because He Loved Me	Released: 2016; Label: Custom; Formats: CD, Streaming
Step By Step	Released: 2021; Label: Chapel Valley; Formats: CD, Streaming
