= Atkinson Literary and Industrial College =

Atkinson Literary and Industrial College was in Madisonville, Kentucky. It was established by Bishop Alexander Walters and the African Methodist Episcopal Zion Church. It opened in 1894.

It was at Seminary and Lake Street until 1903 when it relocated outside Madisonville to a 36-acre property with two 2-story buildings.

H. V. Taylor was one of its presidents. James Muir was its president in 1917.

It was one of several "colored" educational institutions in Madisonville. In 1908 it was documented as co-ed and Samuel E. Duncan as its principal.

== History ==
Originally known as Madisonville High School, it was renamed for a donor. It was also known as Zion High School. It closed in 1936.

H. C. Weeden served as a trustee.
