= Hemphill Brothers Coach Company =

- Industry: Motor coach sales
- Founded: October 1980
- Founder: Joel W. Hemphill, Jr. Trent Hemphill
- Headquarters: Nashville, TN
- Website: https://www.hemphillbrothers.com/

Hemphill Brothers Coach Company is a motor coach sales and operations company that provides coach sales, leasing, maintenance, and custom conversion services. Established in 1980, it is located near Nashville, Tennessee, USA. In 2023, the company was acquired by Dreamliner Luxury Coaches.

The company provides coach services to celebrities, including Cher, Tom Hanks, Pope Benedict XVI, Beyoncé and Jennifer Lopez. The company provided high-security motor coaches to the Obama administration for the 2012 presidential election campaign.

== Overview ==
The company was founded by brothers Joel W. Hemphill, Jr. and Trent Hemphill in October 1980, with the assistance of their father, Joel W. Hemphill, Sr., who had retired from the coach leasing business. Their mother LaBreeska sang for her family group, The Happy Goodman Family, and met and married their father after he wrote several songs for the Goodmans. The couple formed their own group, The Singing Hemphills, which toured for twenty years; Joel Sr. began renting out the family bus in the 1970s as a side business when the group was not touring. Joel Sr.'s coach leasing operation eventually grew to a fleet of eight buses, but when he retired, the fleet had shrunk to two, which he sold to his sons.

The company operates a coach maintenance and conversion facility, and it maintains a fleet of more than 110 motor coaches for lease. The company deals in used coaches and new custom conversions, and maintains a separate website for its sales operation. It has won eight Parnelli Awards for Coach Company of the Year within the Transportation and Logistics division.

Due to the COVID-19 pandemic, $30 million in anticipated revenue was lost in 2020 after multiple planned concert tours were canceled, and Hemphill Brothers began renting to the general public at a rate of US$1200 to 1500 per day, including drivers and fuel. In 2023, the company was acquired by Dreamliner Luxury Coaches, which had been founded in 2020 by Rich Thomson.

On its website, the company claims an extensive list of celebrity clients, including Cher, Lady Gaga, Aerosmith, George Strait, Tom Hanks, Arnold Schwarzenegger, Marilyn Manson, Korn and Pope Benedict XVI. One of their first clients was the band Van Halen. In 2020, the Bobby Hotel in downtown Nashville opened a rooftop lounge housed in a widened Scenicruiser which had been customized by Hemphill Brothers.

=== Maintenance and conversion facility ===
The company operates three conversion and maintenance facilities totaling more than 48,000 sq ft (4,500 m^{2}) located outside of Nashville. It features a 12-bay maintenance shop and two 6-bay conversion shops, and is used to provide services for the Hemphill lease fleet as well as for select external customers. The operation also maintains a parts department that provides mechanical and conversion coach parts.

As part of its customizing operation, the facility maintains woodfinishing and upholstery shops. The conversion operation provides a full range of customizing services to client specifications. For new custom conversions, the operation uses bare coaches from Prevost Car, a manufacturer of touring coach shells for specialty conversions which is located in Quebec, Canada. The operation is a Prevost-authorized maintenance facility. Bare conversion shells are supplied with a plywood floor and a driver's seat; Hemphill is responsible for finishing the interior.

=== Buses for 2012 Obama campaign ===
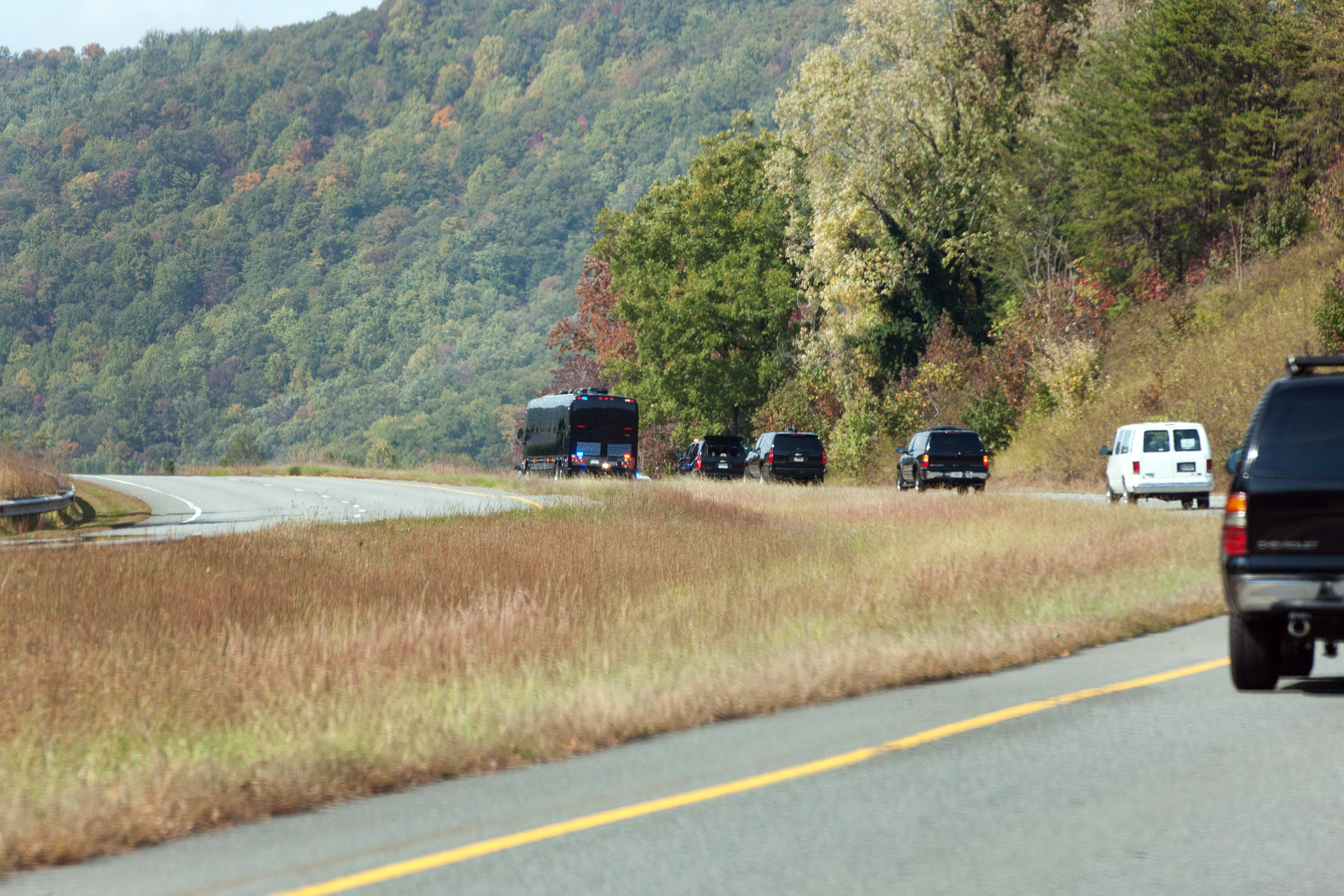
Customized "Ground Force One" bus leading a presidential motorcade in October 2011, on US 321 near Boone, North Carolina

Hemphill Brothers Coach Company customized the buses that were used by President Barack Obama for a trip to Minnesota, Iowa, and Illinois during the week of August 15, 2011. Although the trip had the appearance of a presidential campaign event, it was designated an official trip by the Obama administration and was thus federally financed. During the August 2011 trip, the bus provoked considerable interest and commentary in the news and blogosphere. The LA Times reported a comparison of the bus to Darth Vader's helmet. Tea Party activist and CNN commentator Dana Loesch called the bus "a big, black, hearsemobile of doom." Obama followed up with another bus tour to support the American Jobs Act that October.

The two buses were ordered by the United States Secret Service in 2010 at a combined cost of $2,191,960, and first reported in April 2011. The buses were purchased to address security inadequacies encountered on prior events which used leased vehicles. The Secret Service intends to use the buses as a general asset, and they are not specifically dedicated to the President. As such, the second bus was used in a similar fashion by the Secret Service during the 2012 presidential campaign to transport Mitt Romney. This second bus is now held by the Secret Service as a backup vehicle.

The Secret Service will not confirm details about the construction and appointment of the buses, but it is likely that they are extensively equipped with security and communication equipment. They are speculated to be similar to other presidential conveyances, such as The Beast. If so, they are heavily armored, pressurized, and built to withstand a chemical or rocket-propelled grenade attack.

The buses are reported to have lavish interiors similar to those provided to entertainment celebrities. They are similar in size to standard Greyhound buses, with black exteriors, blacked-out windows, and police lights.
