= Mary Speer =

Mary Speer Reid
- Birth name: Mary Tom Speer
- Born: June 13, 1925; Double Springs, Alabama, U.S.
- Died: September 16, 2014 (aged 89); Nashville, Tennessee, U.S.
- Genres: Christian, Southern Gospel
- Occupation: Singer
- Instrument: Vocals
- Years active: 1920s-1954 (as member of the Speer Family); 1980s-1997 (limited Speer Family appearances); 1995-2014 (singer with Gaither Homecoming Series)
- Labels: Heart Warming, RCA Victor (with Speer Family)

Mary Tom Reid (née Speer; June 13, 1925 – September 16, 2014) was an American southern gospel singer who sang with the well-known Speer Family Gospel Choir from the 1920s until her official retirement in 1954 and again from the 1980s until the group's official retirement in 1997. She also sang with the Gaither Homecoming Series from 1995 until her death.

== Early life ==
Mary Tom Speer was born on June 13, 1925, in Double Springs, Alabama, the youngest daughter and the third of four children born to George Thomas "GT" Speer (March 10, 1891–September 7, 1966) and Lena (née Brock) Speer (November 4, 1899–October 6, 1967). She had two brothers, Jackson Brock (December 28, 1920–March 19, 1999) and Ben Lacy Speer (June 26, 1930–April 7, 2017), and one sister, Rosa Nell Speer (September 22, 1922–May 16, 2017). Her parents formed the Speer Family Gospel Choir in 1921 (see more information below).

== Career ==
=== The Speer Family ===
The Speer Family was formed in 1921 by Mary's parents, along with GT's sister and brother-in-law, Pearl (August 17, 1902–March, 1979) and Logan Claborn (November 12, 1896–February 10, 1981). The group became the first gospel choir in history to include women. This and distinct sound made the group popular in the 1920s and 1930s.

When the Claborns left in 1925, GT and Lena began training 4-year-old Jackson Brock and 3-year-old Rosa Nell to be musicians. Mary eventually joined the group in the late 1920s and brother Ben (born 1930) joined in the mid-1930s. Mary left the group in 1954 after she married. She would eventually return in the 1980s and would stay until the official retirement of the group in 1997.

=== Singing career after The Speer Family ===
After her departure from the Speer Family in 1954, Speer stopped singing and moved to Ohio and back to Nashville in 1968 after her husband died. She went back to singing in the 1980s when she returned to the Speer Family. She stayed with the group until they officially retired in 1997. She also began singing with the Gaither Homecoming Series led by Bill Gaither, his wife Gloria and their family in 1995. She would remain with the group until her death in 2014.

== Personal life ==
Speer married the Reverend Robert Lee Reid in 1954 which caused her departure from the group. She had three children, two daughters: Teresa Ann Fontaine (b. 1955), and Cynthia Lee Reid (b. 1958), and she had one son, Timothy Scott Reid (b. 1960).

Shortly after her husband became a pastor in 1961, Speer, Reid, and the children moved to Ohio where Reid began his ministry. They stayed in Ohio until Rev. Reid's untimely death in December 1968. After the death of her husband, Speer took the children and moved back to Nashville, where she remained for the rest of her life.

== Later years ==
After her return to Nashville, Speer decided to return to the Speer Family. She would only return for special appearances such as concerts and reunion concerts. She would continue performing with the group with which she had not been associated for 30 years until the group officially retired in 1997. She sang with the Gaither Homecoming Series for nineteen years from 1995 until her death in 2014. She was a staff member of her brother Ben Speer's Stamps-Baxter School of Music and secretary of Ben Speer Music both located in Nashville.

== Death ==
Speer died on September 16, 2014, aged 89, from natural causes in Nashville.

== Honors ==
Speer was honored for her contributions to the gospel music industry when she was inducted into the Gospel Music Hall of Fame and again honored when she was inducted into the Southern Gospel Music Association in 2006 at the age of 81.
