= H. C. Weeden =

Henry Clay Weeden (1862-1937) was an editor and author in the United States who wrote Weeden's history of the Colored people of Louisville. It was published in 1897. He edited the Christian Index and later the Zion's Banner publications. A Republican, he was a delegate at Republican National Conventions for 10 years. He belonged to the Knight Templar and Mason fraternal organizations. He was a member of the National Republican League.

He was born enslaved. Elijah P. Marrs, Dr. Stuart Robinson, and Colonel Bennett H. Young helped educate him.

He had editorials reprinted in the New York Independent newspaper and he served as a correspondent during the Grand Army of the Republic Escarpment in Louisville. He served as president of the Mendelssohn Singing Association. He had a law degree.

He helped organize Louisville Cemetery and was a trustee at Atkinson Literary and Industrial College.
