= Johnny Cook (singer) =

- Born: Johnny Cook; March 22, 1949
- Origin: Idlewild, Tennessee
- Died: May 14, 2000 (aged 51)
- Genre: Southern gospel
- Occupation: singer
- Years active: 1970s–2000
- Formerly of: Happy Goodman Family
- Website: Johnny Cook Fan Page

Johnny Cook (March 22, 1949 – May 14, 2000) was a Southern Gospel singer. He led a group, the Johnny Cook Trio, in the 1980s. Cook was a tenor and also sang with The Happy Goodmans and The Statesmen Quartet. Cook may be best remembered for his years singing with The Happy Goodmans, where he and Vestal Goodman would often engage in friendly contests to see who could sing higher; Cook usually won singing the song Looking For A City.

In 1974 and 1975, Cook won the award for Favorite Tenor from the Singing News Fan Awards.

Cook released three albums in the 1970s. His first album was Voice Extraordinaire.

In the late 70's Cook also released the Johnny Cook tape club where he preaches and sings the good news to his fans.

In 1993 Cook was featured in two Gaither Homecoming videos, Old Friends and Turn Your Radio On because of his involvement with the Statesman during that time.

A collection of 169 of Cook's videos has been archived on www.YouTube.com.

== Death ==
Johnny Ray Cook died on May 14, 2000, in Huntsville, Alabama, as a result of congestive heart failure. He was survived by three sons and his mother. He is interred at Oakwood Cemetery in Milan, Tennessee.

== Albums ==
- The SongMasters- The Happy Sounds of The SongMasters
- The Meadows Brothers-Laying Up Treasures
- The Goodman-Covered In Warmth
- The Goodmans-The Goodman Greats
- The Goodmans-Happy Goodman Family Hour
- The Goodmans-Refreshing
- The Goodmans-Southern Gospel Treasury
- The Goodmans DVD-Texas Live
- The Goodmans-Goin Higher
- Johnny Cook-Full Circle
- Johnny Cook-A Johnny Cook Christmas
- Johnny Cook-He's The Real Thing
- Johnny Cook-Real Goodness
- Johnny Cook-Spirit
- Johnny Cook-The Voice
- Johnny Cook-The Voice (rare)
- Johnny Cook-The Voice Extraordinaire
- Johnny Cook Trio-Stepping Out
- Johnny Cook Trio-You Make It Happen
- Johnny Cook & The Voices Triumphant-Unforgettable
- The New Statesmen-Revival
- The New Statesmen-Oh My Lord What A Time
- The New Statesmen-Oh What A Savior
