= Old Time Gospel Hour Quartet =

The Old Time Gospel Hour Quartet was a Southern Gospel Quartet that was formed by Jerry Falwell, Sr., the senior pastor of Thomas Road Baptist Church in 2000. The group performed weekly on The Old Time Gospel Hour television programme of the church, in addition to having a small travel schedule. In addition to selling their merchandise at concerts, they also recruited students for Liberty University.

The group quickly became one of the most popular new groups in the Southern Gospel genre, even winning a Singing News Fan Award for Favorite Horizon Group in 2001. The group's popularity was hurt by the departure of founding tenor Robbie Hiner in 2005 and by pastor Jerry Falwell's death in 2007. After Tony Jarman announced his departure in October 2007, the group announced its disbandment on November 7, 2007.

== Group Members ==
Tenor

- Robbie Hiner (2000–2005)
- Tony Jarman (2005–2007)

Lead

- Wyatt Wilson (2000–2007)

Baritone

- Jeff Stanley (2000–2006)
- Ron Grimes (2006–2007)

Bass

- Christian Davis (2000–2003)
- Jeff Pearles (2003–2005)
- Jerry Pilgrim (2005–2007)

== Discography ==
The Lamb Is King-2001 (Daywind Records)

The Return-2002 (Daywind Records)

Hymns-2004

Classics-2004

Restoration-2005 (Song Garden Music Group)

The Word Is Out-2007
