= Sons of Song =

Sons of Song were an American gospel male voice trio. The trio comprised Calvin Newton, Don Butler, and Bob Robinson. Their greatest success came with the 1960 album Wasted Years, named after the title song Wasted Years. The follow-up album was Unto Him.

== Discography ==
- Wasted Years 1961

Side One: Wasted Years; Highway to Heaven; Had It Not Been for You; I've Got Love; How Far Is Heaven; Psalms [sic] of Victory. Side Two: Thank You for Taking Me Home; If I Had My Life to Live Over;...

- Unto Him 1962

Side One: Unto Him; Pass Me Not Oh Gentle Savior; Spiritual Medley; Have You Seen My Daddy Here; Sweetest Mother; Into The Light. Side Two: Anytime, Anywhere; Jesus Knows All About You; This Man; I'll Never Be Forsaken; American Medley; Songs of the Cross.

- Something Old, Something New 1962
- Gospel Time 1962
- The Sons of Song Sing 12 Lee Roy Abernathy Songs, White Church 12-1791 recorded 1962, released 1971

Side One: You Can't Put a Price on Your Soul; Hard Labor; My God Goes with Me; Beautiful Streets of Gold; He's Such a Comfort to Me; All About Jesus. Side Two Lord, I'm Ready Now to Go; I'm Building a Bridge; I'm Gonna Roll Along; The Big Boss; Connect Me with My Lord; Mom and Dad.
