= Calvin Newton =

American singer (1929–2023)

Calvin Newton (October 28, 1929 – March 3, 2023) was an American gospel singer from West Frankfort, Illinois.

== Youth ==
Newton was a boy soprano who took up amateur boxing because he was tired of being bullied. Newton won a Kentucky Golden Gloves championship, retiring one opponent in just 23 seconds.

== Music career ==
In his late teens Newton was recruited to join the Blackwood Brothers, then a prominent Southern gospel quartet. From 1953 until 1956 Newton sang lead for the Oak Ridge Boys, and later he was a co-founder of the Sons of Song, one of the first pioneering acts in what would become the CCM industry.

== Criminal career ==
According to biographer Russ Cheatham, Newton was "super-handsome, athletic, and charged with sexual charisma...Audacious, Newton never turned down a dare... [hedonistic] -- reckless driving, heavy romancing, and addictive pill popping." Later Newton would spend decades involved in crime: serving time in state and federal prisons for a variety of crimes including theft, counterfeiting, and drug offenses.

== Return to Gospel community ==
In his seventh decade, under the discipleship of Jake Hess, who he described as the one who "stood by him when most gospel singers abandoned him," Newton would end his estrangement from the gospel community, eventually reconciling with dozens of former colleagues and appearing in a Bill Gaither-produced gospel performance video titled All Day Singing and Dinner on the Grounds and touring with Gaither's traveling gospel music show.
