= Rusty Goodman =

American singer (1933–1990)

- Born: Charles F. Goodman; September 2, 1933
- Origin: South Vinemont, Alabama, U.S.
- Died: November 11, 1990 (aged 57)
- Genre: Southern Gospel
- Labels: Canaan; Benson; Homeland
- Formerly of: The Happy Goodman Family

Charles F. "Rusty" Goodman (September 2, 1933 – November 11, 1990) was an American singer/songwriter in the Southern Gospel Music industry. He was a prolific composer whose many songs included "Standing in the Presence of the King", "Leavin' On My Mind", "Home", "John the Revelator", "Touch the Hand of the Lord", "Had it Not Been" "I Believe He's Coming Back" "Look for Me" and "Who Am I?" His songs have been covered by many of the top artists in the music industry including Elvis Presley, The Imperials, J. D. Sumner & The Stamps Quartet, The Speers, The Happy Goodman Family, Michael English and Gaither Vocal Band.

Goodman performed with The Plainsmen Quartet but he is better known with his family group, The Happy Goodman Family, where he sang along with his brothers Howard, Sam, Bobby and his sister-in-law Vestal Goodman. He is also the father of Tanya Goodman Sykes, singer/songwriter and former member of The Goodmans and Heirloom.

Goodman launched his solo career in 1975 when Canaan Records founder Marvin Norcross approached him to record his first solo album. Goodman agreed and recorded The Singer.

He frequently performed both as a soloist and with his own group, "The Goodmans" on the popular Southern Gospel television series "Sing Out America". In 1987, he joined host Bill Traylor and Kelly Nelon Thompson as the co-host of the series until his death. Rusty Goodman died of cancer on November 11, 1990. He was inducted into the Gospel Music Association Hall of Fame in 1993 and then inducted into the Southern Gospel Music Association Hall of Fame in 1997.

He did the bass singing part on the original "North to Alaska," which was recorded by Johnny Horton.

== Awards and honors ==
- 1971 Singing News Fan Awards - Favorite Male Singer
- 1972 Singing News Fan Awards - Favorite Male Singer
- 1972 Singing News Fan Awards - Favorite Baritone Singer
- 1980 GMA Dove Award Rusty Goodman - You Make It Rain For Me (Cover Photo or Cover Art)
- 1993 GMA Hall of Fame
- 1997 SGMA Hall of Fame

== Discography ==
Rusty Goodman Discography
1976–1984 (Canaan Records)	1976 The Singer; 1979 You Make It Rain For Me; 1980 Escape To The Light; 1984 Family Band
1988 (Benson Records)	1988 To Be Honest With You
1988 (Homeland Records)	1988 To the Homeland

Rusty Goodman Compilations & Re-issues
1985 (Canaan Records)	1985 Hits
1998 (Homeland Records)	1998 Canaan Classics - The Singer
2005 (New Haven)	2005 The Essential Collection

== See also ==
The Happy Goodman Family
