= Ben Speer =

American singer

Ben Lacy Speer
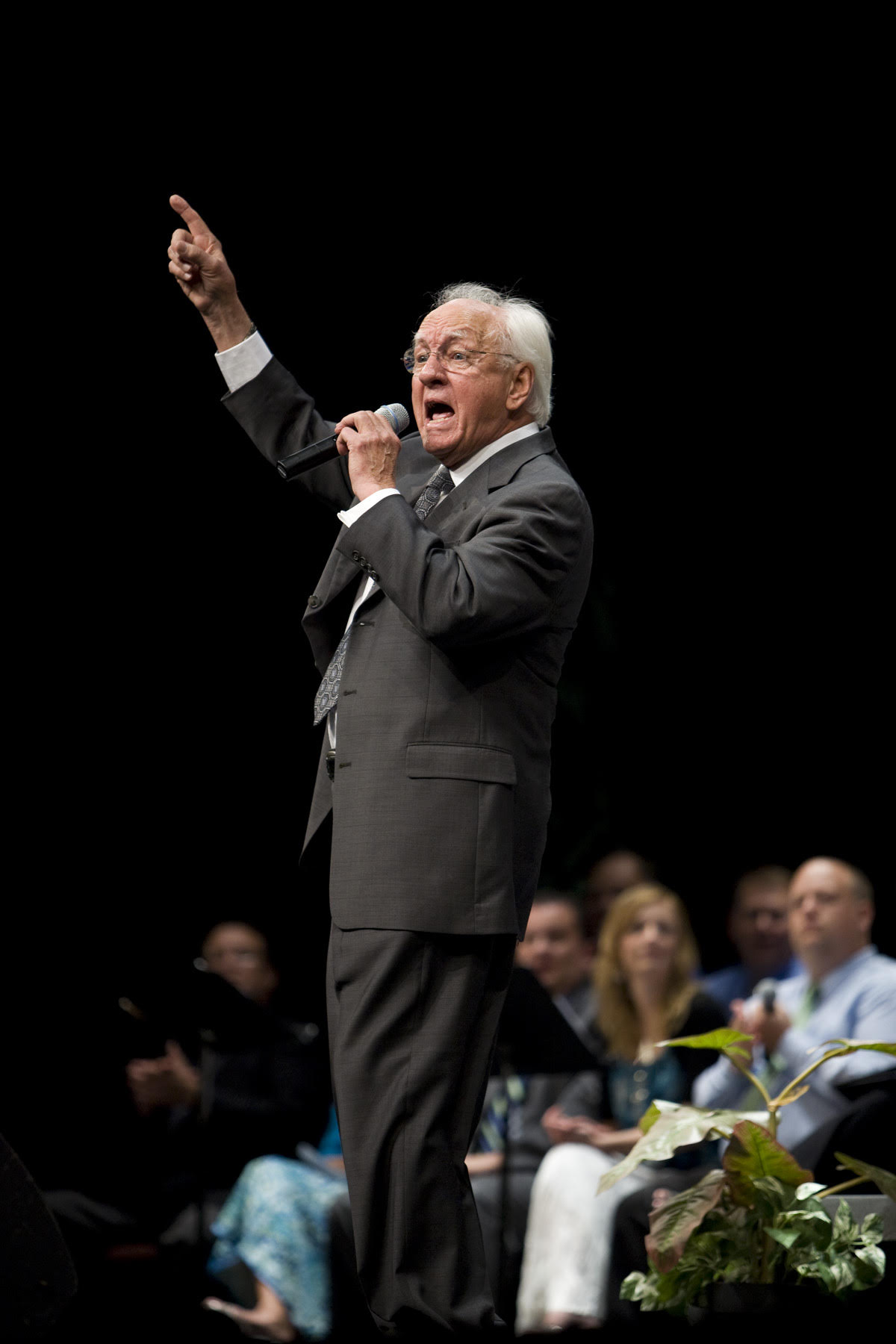
- Born: June 26, 1930; Double Springs, Alabama, U.S.
- Died: April 7, 2017 (aged 86); Nashville, Tennessee, U.S.
- Resting place: Woodlawn Cemetery, Thompson Lane, Nashville, Tennessee
- Occupations: Southern Gospel singer; producer; music director
- Spouses: Mildred Aline Bradley Speer, (m. 1953-1993); Rebekah Long (m. 2014-2017)
- Children: 3
- Relatives: Brock Speer (brother): Mary Tom Speer Reid (sister); Rosa Nell Speer Powell (sister)
- Musical career
- Genre: Southern Gospel
- Instruments: Vocals; Piano

Ben Lacy Speer (June 26, 1930 – April 7, 2017) was a singer, musician, music publisher, and record company executive. He sang for The Speer Family for most of his career. Speer later became the music director of the Gaither Homecoming programs. He was born in Double Springs, Alabama, the youngest child of Lena and G.T. Speer (affectionately known as "Mom" and "Dad" Speer to most people in Southern gospel music), who originally led the group, with Speer's siblings Brock Speer, Mary Tom Speer, and Rosa Nell Speer also participating. He died on April 7, 2017, after suffering from Alzheimer's disease.

== Performing career ==
From starting to sing at age 2, Speer went on to a career that led to his being described on the Gospel Music Association Hall of Fame website as "one of the most enduring and outstanding lead singers and piano performers in gospel music." During his years with the Speer Family, the group recorded more than 75 albums. In addition to singing and playing piano with the Speer Family, he arranged music for them. He retired from the group in 1993, but made some appearances with it until the group itself retired.

== Technical and business career ==
Speer has contributed to both the technical and business aspects of Southern gospel music. Speer was the longtime music director for the Gaither Homecoming series.

The Gospel Music Association Hall of Fame's website noted his technical accomplishments as follows: "Ben chose experimenting with sound equipment as a hobby. He has excelled in this field and is often used as a consultant for sound by his colleagues in gospel music." As owner and chief engineer of Ben Speer Recording Studios, he has produced albums by the Florida Boys, Ivan Parker, The Weatherfords and others. Speer began publishing Southern Gospel music in 1950, founding the Ben Speer Music Company. Among songs published by the company are "What a Day That Will Be," "I'm Standing on the Solid Rock," and "Touring that City."

=== Ben Speer's Stamps Baxter School of Music ===
In 1988, Speer revived the Stamps-Baxter School of Music, which for many years had been an institution for training people in Southern gospel music. Now known as Ben Speer's Stamps Baxter School of Music, the school attracts students from across the United States and from other countries. James R. Goff Jr., in his Close Harmony: A History of Southern Gospel, wrote that a 1998 brochure summarized key elements of the school as follows: "theory, harmony, song writing, sight reading, ear training, performance training, conducting, voice, piano, guitar, bass and drums are taught." The school continues to be operated by members of the Speer family following Speer's death with the school being hosted at Middle Tennessee State University in 2018.

== Honors ==
Speer was inducted into the Gospel Music Association Hall of Fame in 1995, the Southern Gospel Music Association Hall of Fame in 1998 and the Southern Gospel Piano Roll of Honor in 2002.
