= Life flight =

Life Flight or LifeFlight often refers to air ambulance services.

Life Flight may also refer to:

== United States ==
- Life Flight Network, an air ambulance serving Idaho, Montana, Oregon, and Washington
- UMass Memorial Lifeflight, an air ambulance serving Massachusetts, part of UMass Memorial Health
- Metro Life Flight, an air ambulance service out of Cleveland, Ohio
- Life Flight (Geisinger), an air ambulance service in Pennsylvania
- Memorial Hermann Life Flight, an air ambulance service in Houston, Texas
- AHN Lifeflight, operated by Allegheny Health Network and serving western Pennsylvania.
- LifeFlight of Maine, an air ambulance service in Maine

== Other locations ==
- LifeFlight Australia, an air ambulance service based in Queensland, Australia, known until July 2016 as CareFlight
- LifeFlight (Nova Scotia), an air ambulance service based in Nova Scotia, Canada
- Life Flight (New Zealand), an air ambulance service in New Zealand, subject of a reality series

== Other uses ==
- Life Flight (album), by trumpeter Freddie Hubbard

== See also ==
- Lifelight
