= Dottie Rambo discography =

The following is a discography of gospel music singer-songwriter Dottie Rambo (1934 – 2008).

== Solo albums ==
- 1964: Big Voice, Warm Heart
- 1965: The Good Ole Days
- 1966: Dottie Rambo and the Imperials (Heart Warming Records)
- 1968: It's the Soul of Me/Dottie Rambo Sings Spirituals (Heart Warming)
- 1972: Heart Prints (Heart Warming)
- 1972: Sing Faith and Hope (Heart Warming)
- 1973: Dottie Rambo Song Book
- 1977: Love Letters
- 1978: Down by the Creek Bank (Benson)
- 1978: Choral Concert of Love (Heart Warming)
- 1981: Makin' My Own Place (Heart Warming)
- 1989: Camp Goolamockee
- 1992: Hook Line, Subject & Rhyme
- 1993: Walkin' Toward Recovery
- 1993: Dottie Rambo
- 1994: Oil and the Wine
- 2003: Stand by the River (Spring Hill Music) (includes a duet with Dolly Parton)
- 2003: We Shall Behold Him
- 2005: Treasures, Yesterday, Today...
- 2009: Sheltered (Daywind)

== As "The Rambos" ==
The Encyclopedia of Gospel Music lists a discography of her family group:

- 1964: Singing Rambos (Vista Records)
- 1965: Gospel Echoes "Those Singing Rambos" (Introducing Buck and Dottie's Daughter, Reba)
- 1947: Come Spring
- 1956: Gospel Ballads
- 1966: An Evening With The Rambos (HeartWarming)
- 1949: The Soul Singing Rambos (HeartWarming)
- 1955: This Is My Valley
- 1932: Nashville Gospel (HeartWarming)
- 1949: Live
- 1950: Soul Classics
- 1977: Reflections
- 1988: Soul In The Family (HeartWarming)
- 1948: If That Isn't Love
- 1973: Sing Me On Home (HeartWarming)
- 1973: Spotlighting The Rambos (Vista Records)
- 1973: Belief (Vista Records)
- 1973: Sonshine (HeartWarming)
- 1973: Too Much to Gain to Lose (Vista Records)
- 1974: Yours, Until He Comes (HeartWarming)
- 1974: Alive and Live at Souls Harbor (HeartWarming)
- 1975: There Has To Be A Song (HeartWarming)
- 1994: These Three Are One (HeartWarming)
- 1954: The Son Is Shining (HeartWarming)
- 1967: Rambo Country (HeartWarming)
- 1977: Naturally (HeartWarming)
- 1978: Queen of Paradise
- 1976: Down By The Creek Bank
- 1979: Silver Jubilee (HeartWarming)
- 1979: Crossin' Over (HeartWarming)
- 1981: Rambo Reunion (HeartWarming)
- 1982: We Shall Behold Him (Musical)
- 1983: Son Of Thunder, Daughter of Light
- 1983: Memories Made New (HeartWarming)
- 1984: Destined For The Throne (Impact)
- 1984: The Perfect Rose Single & Interview
- 1986: Reaching Around The World
- 1987: The Legend Continues
- 1992: Masters of Gospel (Riversong)
- 1992: Lost Recordings of The Rambos/Gospel Echoes
- 1993: Walking Toward Recovery
- 1994: Mama's Favorite Hymns

== Appearances on other albums ==
- 1974: Highway Call Dickey Betts (title song)
- 1982: He Set My Life to Music Barbara Mandrell (MCA) "I Will Glory In The Cross"
- 1994: Soul Embrace David Robertson (Star Song)"One More Time"
- 2006: Revival The Dunaways (Zion Music) "I Just Came To Talk With You Lord"
- 2009: Here I Am Christie Lynn "My Song Is New", "I'm Gonna Leave Here Shouting"

== Video ==
- 1990: Greatest Hits Video
- 1990: Christian Video Magazine "The Rambos Special"
- 2000: A New Year's Eve Special: In the Year of Our Lord 2000 (TBN)
- 2003: More Than the Music - Life Story - Dottie Rambo/ The LeFevres (Word Entertainment)
- 2003: We Shall Behold Him:Tribute to Dottie Rambo (Word Entertainment)

== Gaither Homecoming video performances ==
- 2002: I'll Fly Away "Too Much To Gain To Lose", "He Looked Beyond My Fault"
- 2004: Build A Bridge "I Go To The Rock"
- 2004: Reunion "He Touched Me"
- 2004: Dottie Rambo with Homecoming Friends "Tears Will Never Stain The Streets Of That City", "I've Never Been This Homesick Before", "The Holy Hills Of Heaven Call Me"
- 2008: Homecoming Picnic "Mama's Teaching Angels How To Sing"
- 2009: Nashville Homecoming "I Just Came To Talk With You, Lord".
