= Wasted Years (Wally Fowler song) =

Song by Wally Fowler

from the album May The Lord Bless You Real Good
- Released: 1960
- Genre: Gospel
- Length: 2:23
- Label: Big Gospel Records
- Songwriter(s): Albert Willams

"Wasted Years" is a 1960 gospel song by Wally Fowler. The song was written by Albert Williams. Fowler is pianist with the John Daniel Quartet.

== Recordings ==
- Wally Fowler and the Oak Ridge Quartet
- Sons of Song
- The Sensational Nightingales
- Jimmy Swaggart
- The Statesmen Quartet
