= Sam Goodman =

American Southern gospel singer (1931–1991)

- Born: March 19, 1931
- Origin: Bremen, Alabama, United States
- Died: August 1, 1991 (aged 60)
- Genre: Southern Gospel
- Label: Canaan
- Formerly of: The Happy Goodman Family

Sam Goodman (March 19, 1931 – August 5, 1991) was an American Southern gospel singer/songwriter born in Bremen, Alabama.

Goodman performed with his siblings in The Happy Goodman Family, where Sam sang baritone and first tenor. He also had a brief solo career.

== Life and career ==
Goodman served in the United States Air Force, and after his discharge, joined The Happy Goodman Family. Sam acted as the group's spokesperson, and introduced the members and their songs on stage. On record albums produced by The Happy Goodman Family, Sam was known for telling comical stories about his family. The group performed at camp meetings, all night sings, churches, and on television and radio.

Goodman won a Singing News Fan Award for Favorite Baritone in 1974. In 1982, Goodman received Minister's credentials with the Assemblies of God. The Happy Goodman Family split up in 1983. In 1990, Sam reunited with siblings Howard, Rusty, and Vestal to record the album The Reunion, which received a Grammy nomination that year.

In 2011, Goodman was posthumously inducted into the Southern Gospel Museum Hall of Fame. He died in 1991.

== Solo discography ==
=== Albums ===
- 1979—Happiness Is
- 1984—The Newest Thing Around
