= Brock Speer =

American bass singer and leader in Southern Gospel music

Jackson Brock Speer
- Born: Jackson Brock Speer; December 28, 1920; Houston, Alabama, U.S.
- Died: March 29, 1999 (aged 78); Nashville, Tennessee, U.S.
- Occupations: Bass singer and leader of the Speer Family
- Known for: Leadership and promotion of Southern Gospel music

Brock Speer (December 28, 1920 – March 29, 1999) was an American gospel singer. He was a bass for the Speer Family Southern Gospel musical group and was a leader in Southern Gospel music.

One might say that Southern Gospel music was Speer's life. David Liverett's book, This Is My Story: 145 of the World's Greatest Gospel Singers, includes the following comments written by Speer's nephew, Steve Speer, and printed in the program distributed at Brock's funeral:

Jackson Brock Speer was born in Winston County, Alabama, just two months before his father and mother began a singing group called the Speer Quartet. For the remaining seventy-eight years of his life, he was inextricably intertwined with that group. With only one exception -- World War II -- he sang with his family his entire life.

== Achievements and recognition ==
Speer's academic accomplishments included a bachelor's degree in theology from Trevecca Nazarene University in 1950 and a master of divinity degree from Vanderbilt University. Trevecca also awarded him an honorary doctor of music degree in 1997. In addition to singing with and managing the Speer Family, Speer actively promoted Southern Gospel music through his work with the Gospel Music Association. His service to GMA included being chairman of the board of directors and president of the organization. He was inducted into the Gospel Music Hall of Fame in 1975. Although Speer's efforts were focused on music, he was also a licensed minister.

== Family ==
Speer's parents were G.T. and Lena Speer (often referred to as "Dad" and "Mom" Speer). He had three siblings: Ben Speer, Mary Tom Speer Reid, and Rosa Nell Speer Powell.

Speer was married to Faye Ihrig Speer for 50 years. They had three children: Suzan Speer (1952-2019), Marc Speer, and Brian Speer.
