= Speer Family =

Southern gospel group

The Speer Family
- The Speer Family c.1966

Background information
- Also known as: The Speers
- Origin: Nashville, Tennessee, United States
- Genres: Christian, Southern Gospel
- Years active: 1921–1998
- Labels: Heart Warming, RCA Victor, Skylite

The Speer Family was a Southern gospel family musical group. It was founded in 1921 by George Thomas ("Dad") Speer (1891–1966), his wife, Lena Darling ("Mom") Speer (née Brock; 1899–1967), and his sister and brother-in-law, Pearl Claborn (1902–1979) and Logan Claborn (William Logan Claborn; 1896–1981). Jennings Harold Lane was also a member of this group.

== Early years ==
Both George Thomas and Lena came from musical families. G.T. and Lena began the group to supplement their income, which otherwise came from farming. Before them, almost all gospel groups were made up solely of men. The Speer Family are considered pioneers in featuring women singers.

Within two years, the group had become so successful that G.T. Speer decided to make the group full-time. In the late 1920s, the group established a working relationship with the James David Vaughan Music Company, selling songbooks. However, the group's success proved to be insufficient to support two families' budgets. In 1925, Logan and Pearl Claborn left the group; Logan returned to his job as a carpenter. To fill the void, "Dad" Speer enlisted his and Lena's 5-year-old son, Brock Speer, and their 3-year-old daughter, Rosa Nell Speer, to sing with them. The group's concerts featured several duet songs by "Dad" and "Mom" Speer, and several songs with Brock singing alto and Rosa Nell singing lead.

In 1934, "Dad" Speer accepted a full-time job with the Vaughan Music Company. This position afforded greater financial security for the family. Also in the mid 1920s/early 1930s, two more siblings, Mary Tom Speer (1925-2014) and Ben Speer (1930-2017), joined the group.

In 1941, James Vaughan died, and the Speer family left his company. During his time at the Vaughan Company, "Dad" Speer wrote or co-wrote more than 600 songs. After leaving, they joined the Stamps-Baxter company, a Vaughan competitor, and also became a regular performer on the WSFA radio station.

During WWII, Brock Speer enlisted in the Army Air Corps; after the war, he studied at Nashville’s Trevecca Nazarene College.

== Later years/deaths ==
George Thomas "Dad" Speer died in 1966 and Lena "Mom" Speer died in 1967. Pearl and Logan Claborn died in 1979 and 1981 respectively. The group, led by brothers Brock (died March 29, 1999, at age 78) and Ben, underwent various configurations over the next several decades. Ben retired from the group in 1993 although he did appear on occasion with the group until Brock officially retired the Speer Family at the 1998 National Quartet Convention. Ben Speer continued to be involved in Southern Gospel music as the music director of the Gaither Homecoming Series, and as owner of Ben Speer's Stamps-Baxter School of Music, a Southern Gospel singing school, up until his death in 2017, which continues under the ownership of son Stephen.

Ben, Mary Tom, Rosa Nell and Faye continued to make appearances in Gaither Homecoming videos. The group was inducted into the Gospel Music Association's Hall of Fame in 1998, following individual inductions for "Dad" Speer (1971); "Mom" Speer (1972); Brock Speer (1975); and Ben Speer (1995). All of the immediate family members have been inducted into the Southern Gospel Music Association Hall of Fame, "Dad" Speer, "Mom" Speer and Brock Speer were inducted in 1997, Ben Speer was inducted in 1998, Rosa Nell Speer Powell was inducted in 2005, Mary Tom Speer Reid was inducted in 2006 and Faye Ihrig Speer was inducted in 2014. The group was inducted into the Volunteer State Music Hall of Fame 2026.

The Speer Family was the first group to receive the Gospel Music Association's Lifetime Achievement Award. Other recognition for the Speers included inclusion in the Alabama Music Hall of Fame, receiving the Southern Gospel Music Guild's Heritage Award, and receiving 14 Dove Awards. The group's recording of "I'm Standing on the Solid Rock" has the distinction of having the longest tenure as the top song on the Singing News chart of popular Southern Gospel recordings.

Mary Tom Speer-Reid died on September 16, 2014, aged 89. Faye Speer died on October 13, 2015, aged 86. Ben Speer died on April 7, 2017, at age 86. A month later, Rosa Nell Speer-Powell, who was the last survivor of the original Speer Family, died on May 16, 2017, at the age of 94.

Since the retirement of the Speer Family in 1998, two spin-off groups have been created. The New Speer Revival was a short-lived group formed in the early 2000s by former Speer Family members Marc Speer and former soprano Karen Apple. They recorded two albums titled Carrying On The Tradition in 2002 and While Ages Roll in 2004 which featured recordings of some of the Speer Family's best-known songs. Another group was formed in 2018 by Brock and Faye's son Brian Speer and his wife Allison Durham Speer, they were joined by bass singer Mike Allen and relatively new singer Ben Waites to form the New Speer Family. They have recorded one album titled "A Singing Heritage"

Several other notable Southern Gospel singers have been part of the Speer Family including Ann Downing, Sue Dodge, Jeanne Johnson, Daryl Williams and Ginger Laxson.

== Discography (incomplete) ==
- 1949: Especially Warm (Heart Warming)
- 1951: Happy Harmonies (Vista)
- 1955: The Speer Family Album (RCA Victor)
- 1958: "Dad" Speer's Golden Anniversary In Gospel Music (Sing LP 701)
- 1958: The Speer Family Sings Songs You Requested (Skylite)
- 1959: Because Of Him (Skylite)
- 1960: The Singing Speers (Skylite)
- 1961: All-Night Singing: Speer Family Style (Starday)
- 1961: Family Favorites (Skylite)
- 1963: The Speer Family Sacred Hour (RCA Camden)
- 1964: Garden Of Melody (Skylite)
- 1964: Old-Time Family Religion (Speer Family, Johnson Family, Carter Family) (RCA Camden)
- 1965: A Singing Heritage (Heart Warming)
- 1965: On Concert Tour! (Heart Warming)
- 1965: The Happy Jubilee (Heart Warming)
- 1965: Won't We Be Happy (Skylite)
- 1966: Rejoicing With Mom (Heart Warming)
- 1966: The Gospel In Song (RCA Victor)
- 1967: "Dad" Speer's Greatest Hits (Skylite)
- 1967: Hymns Of Joy And Peace (Heart Warming)
- 1968: Big Singing Day (Heart Warming)
- 1969: Heavy On Ben (Heart Warming)
- 1970: The Old Rugged Cross Made The Difference (Heart Warming)
- 1971: The King Is Coming (Heart Warming)
- 1972: A Family Affair (Heart Warming)
- 1972: The Speers In Concert (Heart Warming)
- 1973: Friendship with Jesus (Vista)
- 1973: Happy Harmonies (Vista)
- 1973: He Touched Me (Vista)
- 1973: Touring That City (Heart Warming)
- 1974: A Tribute - The Songs Of Bill and Gloria Gaither (Heart Warming)
- 1974: God Gave The Song (Heart Warming)
- 1975: Doug Oldham and the Speers (Heart Warming)
- 1975: Especially Warm (Heart Warming)
- 1975: Something Good Is About To Happen (Heart Warming)
- 1975: The Best of the Best (A/The Speers, B/The Imperials) (Heart Warming)
- 1975: The King Is Coming (Heart Warming)
- 1976: Between The Cross and Heaven (Heart Warming)
- 1977: Cornerstone (Heart Warming)
- 1978: Promises to Keep (Heart Warming)
- 1978: The Songs Live on (Heart Warming)
- 1980: Interceding (Heart Warming)
- 1981: 60th Anniversary Celebration (Heart Warming)
- 1981: Celebrating 60th Anniversary Featuring Mom & Dad (Skylite)
- 1982: Hallelujah (Heart Warming)
- 1982: Tribute (Heart Warming)
- 1983: Keep a Happy Heart (Skylite)
- 1983: The Speers Live (Featuring The Speer Sisters) (Heart Warming)
- 1984: Sunday Morning Singing (RiverSong)
- 1985: Family Reunion (RiverSong)
- 1985: Rejoicing (Riversong)
- 1985: The Speer Family (GreatComm)
- 1986: Stepping Out in Faith (RiverSong)
- 1987: Celebration At Sea (Live) (Riversong)
- 1988: Saved To The Uttermost (Homeland)
- 1989: He's Still In The Fire (Homeland)
- 1990: Best of the Best...Songs You Keep Asking For (Homeland)
- 1990: Hallelujah Time (Homeland)
- 1991: The Speers 70th Anniversary Celebration (Homeland)
- 1992: He Still Reigns (Homeland)
- 1993: A Beautiful Day (Homeland)
- 1994: Giving (Homeland)
- 1995: A Family Affair (Homeland)
- 1996: 75th Diamond Jubilee (Homeland)
- 1999: Through All These Years (Homeland)
- 2000: Blessed Assurance (Homeland)
- 2002: Just Can't Quit (Custom/Ben Speer Music)

== Awards ==
GMA Dove Award for Mixed Group of The Year (1969-70-71-72-73-74-75-76-77) (The awards for 1971 were nullified; had the awards not been nullified The Speer Family would have won the award for Mixed Group of The Year)

Gospel Music Hall of Fame (1998; The Speer Family) (1971; Dad Speer) (1972; Mom Speer) (1975; Brock Speer) (1995; Ben Speer)

Southern Gospel Music Hall of Fame (1997; Dad Speer) (1997; Mom Speer) (1997; Brock Speer) (1998; Ben Speer) (2005; Rosa Nell Speer Powell) (2006: Mary Tom Speer Reid) (2014; Faye Ihrig Speer)
