= Howard Goodman =

American gospel singer (1921–2002)

- Also known as: Happy Goodman
- Born: Howard Goodman; November 7, 1921; Dora, Alabama, U.S
- Died: November 30, 2002 (aged 81) Nashville, Tennessee, U.S
- Genres: Southern gospel, Christian
- Occupation: Singer
- Years active: 1940s–2002
- Spouse: Vestal Freeman (m. 1949)

Howard "Happy" Goodman (November 7, 1921 – November 30, 2002) was an American gospel singer. In 1949, he founded the vocal group The Happy Goodman Family which included combinations of all eight Goodman siblings and his wife Vestal Goodman (née Freeman).

== Early life ==
Howard was born on November 7, 1921, in Dora, Alabama, U.S. Howard was the oldest of eight children, Gussie Mae, Stella, Eloise, Helen Ruth, Sam, Charles (Rusty) and Bobby. In 1949 he married the former Vestal Freeman.

== Career ==
Howard began his career with his sisters Gussie Mae and Stella performing Southern gospel in the 1940s. As the rest of the siblings got old enough to sing they would join the group. Howard’s wife Vestal joined the group following their marriage in 1949. Bass singer Bill Huie was with the group for awhile in the 1950s as was drummer Jake Hand and accordionist Harold Patrick. Howard’s niece LaBreeska, daughter of Gussie Mae, sang with the group prior to her marriage to Joel Hemphill. Vestal’s sister Faye also sang with the group briefly.

During the 1950s the Goodman sisters left the group to get married and the brothers left to do stints in the army. Howard and Vestal did evangelistic work and sang with LaBreeska. Howard and Vestal eventually settled in Madisonville, Kentucky and started a church, Life Temple.

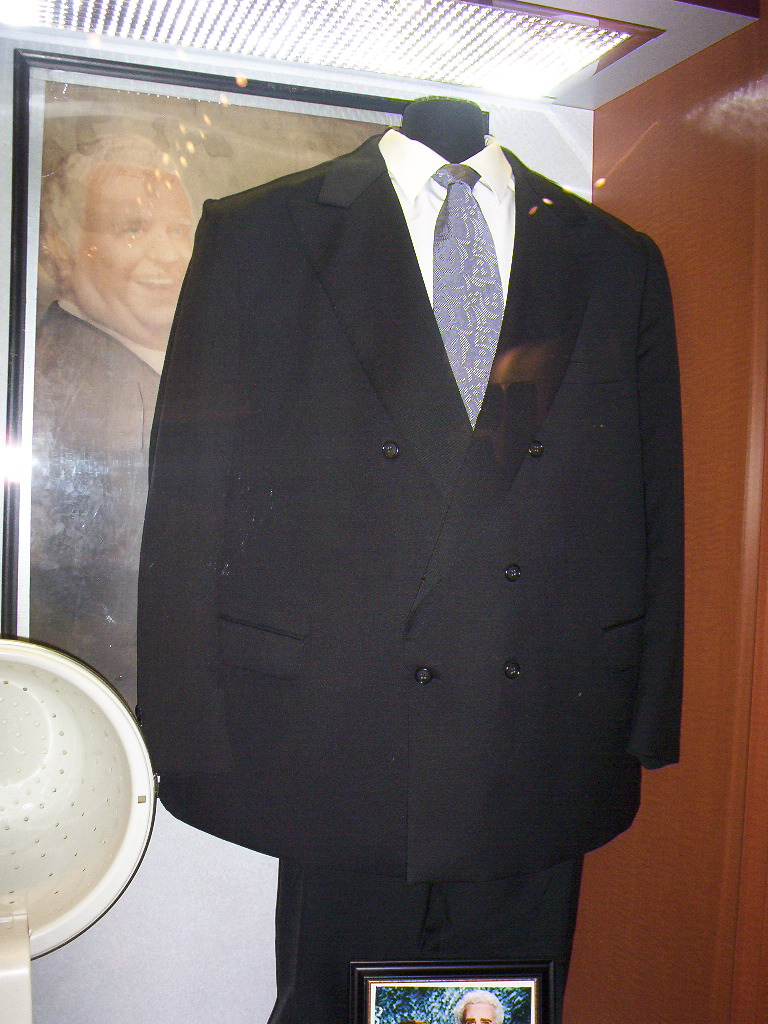
Howard Goodman's suit on display at the SGMA Museum in Dollywood Theme Park

By the early 60s Sam, Rusty, and Bobby and their families had settled in Madisonville and the group began to sing more regularly eventually gaining notoriety. Howard, Vestal, Sam, and Rusty would continue singing until the late 70s when Howard and Vestal left the group to go back in to evangelistic work.

Following the success of Bill Gaither’s Homecoming video series and the deaths of Rusty and Sam, former Goodman band member Johnny Minick joined Howard and Vestal and The Happy Goodman Family was reborn. The group continued until Howard’s death.

== Awards ==
- Grammy Award for Best Gospel/Contemporary Christian Music Performance (1969)
- Grammy Award for Best Gospel Performance, Traditional (1979)

== Death ==
Howard was hospitalized for seven months as a result of various complications following a knee surgery, He was undergoing therapy and rehabilitation when he developed pneumonia a week prior to his death. He died on November 30, 2002 in Nashville, Tennessee, aged 81.
