= Happy Goodman Family =

Former Southern gospel group

The Happy Goodman Family is a Southern gospel group that was founded in the 1940s by Howard "Happy" Goodman and performed together for several decades. The Happy Goodmans achieved significant popularity in the 1960s. In 1968, they won the first Grammy Award to be awarded for a gospel album by a gospel group.

== History ==
The Happy Goodman Family began around 1938. Howard Goodman (eldest of eight children) had been traveling as an evangelist and gradually began to form his seven siblings into a gospel singing group. Until the late 1950s there were various combinations of all eight brothers and sisters, always including Howard, and after 1949 his wife Vestal. Eventually the Goodman sisters (Gussie Mae, Stella, Eloise, and Helen Ruth) left the group to get married. During this period brothers Sam, Charles (Rusty) and Bobby Ray all had various careers as well. Sam served in the United States Air Force, Rusty was in the United States Army and later sang with The Plainsmen and Martha Carson. Bobby drove a truck and played in a rock and roll band. Howard and Vestal became evangelists. Gussie Mae's daughter LaBreeska Rogers Hemphill traveled with them off and on during this period.

In the early 60s Howard and Vestal moved to Madisonville, Kentucky and started a church named Life Temple. Sam and his family soon joined Howard and Vestal in Madisonville at the church. Howard, Vestal, and Sam did some singing in the area. In 1962 Rusty left the Plainsmen and moved to Madisonville as well. Before long Bobby joined the group again playing bass guitar. It was during this time period that the group began to travel more widely and become more well-known on the gospel music circuit.

In the 1963, the group released their first full-length recording "I'm Too Near Home" on the Sims label. It was later re-released on Canaan/Word Records in 1965.

Appearances at the National Quartet Convention got them in front of promoters who in turn booked them across the country. In 1964, they were asked to become one of the flagship groups for a new Southern Gospel program called The Gospel Singing Jubilee along with The Florida Boys, Dixie Echoes, and The Couriers Quartet. This program soon became one of the most popular gospel music programs and would run for over twenty years. The Goodmans would soon become one of the most popular groups on the program, and would remain so for ten years till they left to start their own TV program, The Happy Goodman Family Hour. The Goodmans also had a short-lived program called Down Home with The Happy Goodman Family. The weekly TV exposure allowed The Happy Goodman Family to take the nation by storm. They quickly became America's favorite singing family. Ranker list the Happy Goodmans as the 3rd all-time Best Southern Gospel Bands/Artists.

The Goodmans had a long list of hit songs. Many of the songs they introduced to gospel music are now considered classics. Songs such as "I Wouldn't Take Nothing For My Journey Now", "Who Am I?", "God Walks the Dark Hills", "Had It Not Been", "What a Beautiful Day", and many others will forever be part of gospel music and synonymous with the Happy Goodman Family.

The Goodmans broke new ground in gospel music during the 1950s by incorporating drummer Jake Hand as well as accordion and various guitars. When the group began traveling again in the 1960s their instrumentation consisted of Howard at the piano and Bobby playing bass guitar. Rusty and Sam would occasionally play guitars as well. During the late 1960s and 1970s they began adding more musicians including pianist Eddie Crook, drummer Ricky Goodman (son of Howard and Vestal) and various guitarists and bass players. It was during these years that they developed their now classic "grab a note and hang on" endings. Sam's humorous emcee work, Howard's showmanship at the piano, Rusty's songwriting, and Vestal's hairdos, white handkerchiefs, and powerful singing voice all rose to a new prominence. Tenor Johnny Cook joined the group for a while in 1974 and Rusty's daughter Tanya was added in 1976.

=== Separate paths ===
Around 1980, creative differences about musical style caused a division in the family. The musical landscape of Christian music was expanding considerably at this time, and Howard and Vestal wanted to maintain their traditional sound. Rusty, Sam, and Tanya wanted to take the group in a more contemporary direction. Ultimately, Howard and Vestal decided to leave the group, after making what would become one of their best albums. Rusty, Sam, and Tanya carried on with Johnny Cook returning at tenor. Michael English joined them a couple of years later singing lead. Michael left The Goodmans, a short time after joining, to sing with The Singing Americans.

=== Reunion ===
The Goodmans Greatest Hits from 1985, with Sam, Vestal, Howard, and Rusty

Aside from a one-time performance at the 1984 National Quartet Convention by Sam, Rusty, Howard, and Vestal, the Happy Goodmans did not sing together from 1984 to 1990. Shortly after the breakup, a compilation album, The Goodmans Greatest Hits was released in 1985, with the quartet pictured on the cover. It has more recently been re-mastered and re-released on Compact Disc. In 1990, news that Rusty had been diagnosed with cancer prompted the family to record a project together called "The Reunion". Although they initially planned to tour in support of the project, Rusty's health deteriorated rapidly. He died in November 1990. Sam followed his brother in death the next year. This album features the last song Rusty wrote, Standing in the Presence of the King, a fitting end to his songwriting career.

=== Howard and Vestal's Final Stand with Johnny Minick ===
In 1993, Howard and Vestal were joined on vocals by former Happy Goodman band member Johnny Minick. As a trio, they brought back the Happy Goodman name to the delight of fans. Several projects were released over the next five years and they were regular fixtures at Gaither Homecoming events. Their last project was appropriately titled The Final Stand (2001). In 2002, a biographical video titled More Than The Music...Life Story chronicled the history of the Happy Goodmans. It is preceded by O Happy Day, a biography written by Jamie Buckingham (1973). O Happy Day is an early telling of the Happy Goodman Family in stories recalled by Howard. Vestal wrote her autobiography titled Vestal! "Lord I Wouldn't Take Nothin' for My Journey Now" (1999) and released a number of solo projects before her death in 2003, including two Vestal and Friends CDs featuring duets with a diverse array of vocalists, including George Jones, Sandi Patty, Dolly Parton, Andraé Crouch, Wynonna Judd, Bill and Gloria Gaither, Newsboys and the love of her life, Howard Goodman. In her final years, she also appeared regularly on Bill Gaither's Precious Memories television series.

The group recorded 15 number-one singles and played over 3,500 shows. They were inducted into the Gospel Music Hall of Fame in 1998.

=== Tanya with Johnny Minick ===
In 2012, Michael and Tanya Sykes (Rusty's daughter and son-in-law) stayed with Minick when they returned back to the Nashville metropolitan area for a few weeks. The trip reformed another Goodman family group, the Goodman Revival.

== Awards ==
In 1968, The Goodmans won the Grammy Award for Best Gospel Performance for the 1967 album The Happy Gospel of the Happy Goodmans. It was the first Grammy awarded for a gospel album by a gospel group. The Goodmans also won the same award in 1978 (only then called Best Gospel Performance, Traditional) for Refreshing. In 1969, with the founding of the Gospel Music Association and the GMA's Dove Awards, the Goodmans were honored that year too. Vestal was the first Female Vocalist of the Year for the 1969 Dove Awards. The Goodmans were remembered year after year when it came time to nominate for awards. In 2027, The Happy Goodman Family was inducted into the Volunteer State Music Hall of Fame.

== Discography ==
1963–1964 (SIMS Records)	I'm Too Near Home (1963); The Best of The Happy Goodman Family (1964); It's A Wonderful Feelin (1964)	Howard, Vestal, Rusty, Sam; Howard, Vestal, Rusty, Sam; Howard, Vestal, Rusty, Sam
1965–1982 (Canaan Records)	What a Happy Time! (1965); Bigger 'N Better (1965); Good 'N Happy (1966); The Happy Gospel of the Happy Goodmans (1967); Portrait of Excitement (1968); This Happy House (1969); Good Times with the Happy Goodmans (1970); Wanted Live (1971); Leave Your Sorrows and Come Along (1972); The Legendary Goodmans (1973); The Happy Goodman Family Hour (1974); Covered in Warmth (1975); 99 44/100% Goodmans (1976); The Very Best of the Happy Goodmans LIVE (1977); Refreshing (1978); Better Hurry Up (1979); Goin' Higher (1981); Goodman Greats (1982); Chosen (1982)	Howard, Vestal, Rusty, Sam, Bobby; Howard, Vestal, Rusty, Sam, Bobby; Howard, Vestal, Rusty, Sam, Bobby; Howard, Vestal, Rusty, Sam, Bobby; Howard, Vestal, Rusty, Sam, Bobby; Howard, Vestal, Rusty, Sam, Bobby; Howard, Vestal, Rusty, Sam, Bobby; Howard, Vestal, Rusty, Sam, Bobby; Howard, Vestal, Rusty, Sam; Howard, Vestal, Rusty, Sam; Howard, Vestal, Rusty, Sam, Johnny Cook; Howard, Vestal, Rusty, Sam, Johnny Cook; Howard, Vestal, Rusty, Sam, Tanya; Howard, Vestal, Rusty, Sam, Tanya; Howard, Vestal, Rusty, Sam, Johnny Cook; Howard, Vestal, Rusty, Sam; Rusty, Sam, Tanya, Johnny Cook; Rusty, Sam, Tanya, Johnny Cook, Michael English; Rusty, Sam, Tanya, Michael English
1990 (Word Records)	The Reunion	Howard, Vestal, Rusty, Sam
1997–2000 (Spring Hill Records)	Always (1997); Joy for the Journey (1998); Live At Lakewood (1998); 50 Years (2000)	Howard, Vestal, Johnny Minick; Howard, Vestal, Johnny Minick; Howard, Vestal, Johnny Minick; Howard, Vestal, Tanya, Johnny Minick
2000 (Pamplin Entertainment)	Set Your Sails	Howard, Vestal, Johnny Minick
2001 (Crowne/Spring Hill)	The Final Stand	Howard, Vestal, Johnny Minick
2014 (Gaither Music Group)	* Songs in the Key of Happy	Tanya, Michael Sykes, Johnny Minick
2017 (Gaither Music Group)	* Still Happy	Tanya, Michael Sykes, Johnny Minick

=== Compilations ===
1985 (Word Records)	Their Greatest Hits	Howard, Vestal, Rusty, Sam
1994 (Arrival/K-Tel)	The Original Happy Goodman Family	Howard, Vestal, Rusty, Sam
1996 (Crowne Music Group)	The Collection, Vol. 1 (Double CD); The Collection, Vol. 2 (Double CD)	Howard, Vestal, Rusty, Sam, Bobby, Tanya, Johnny Cook; Howard, Vestal, Rusty, Sam, Bobby, Tanya, Johnny Cook
2000 (Word Records)	Southern Gospel Treasury Series	Howard, Vestal, Rusty, Sam, Bobby, Tanya, Johnny Cook, Michael English
2003 (New Haven Records)	Greatest Hits	Howard, Vestal, Rusty, Sam, Bobby, Tanya, Johnny Cook

== Complete list of group members ==
=== Band members ===
- Howard Goodman 1963–1971 (pianist, vocalist)
- Eddie Crook 1971–1975, 1978–1982 (pianist)
- Johnny Minick 1975–1977 (pianist)
- Aaron Wilburn 1972–1974 (rhythm guitar, soloist)
- Jack Smith 1971–1974 (steel guitar)
- Gary Dee 1975–1976 (steel guitar)
- Steve "Rabbit" Easter 1977–1979, 1981–1982 (steel guitar, banjo, dobro)
- Benny Johnson 1980 (steel guitar)
- Ricky Goodman 1970s–1980 (drummer)
- Bruce Droit 1980–1982 (drummer)
- Dwayne Friend 1965 (guitarist)
- Ernie Maxwell 1966–1970 (guitarist)
- Jim "Duke" Dumas 1972–1974 (guitarist)
- Jeff Chambers 1975–1977 (guitarist)
- Bobby Goodman 1965–1971 (bass guitar, soloist)
- Larry Strzelecki 1972–1977 (bass guitar)
- Joey Maxwell 1977–1978 (bass guitar)
- Keith Moore 1978 (bass guitar)
- Jefferson Ross 1980 (bass guitar)
- James Gordon Freeze 1980–1982 (bass guitar)
