= Vestal Goodman =

American southern gospel singer (1929–2003)

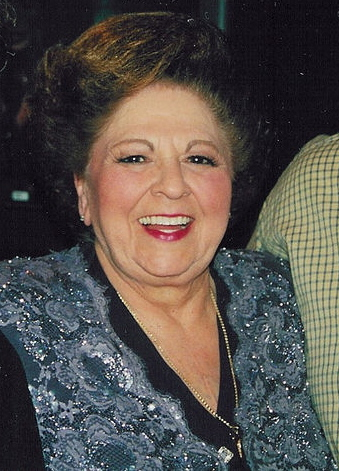
- Goodman in 2001

Background information
- Born: Vestal Freeman; December 13, 1929; Fyffe, Alabama, U.S.
- Died: December 27, 2003 (aged 74) Celebration, Florida, U.S.
- Genre: Southern gospel
- Occupation: Gospel Singer
- Instrument: Vocals
- Years active: 1949–2003
- Formerly of: Happy Goodman Family
- Spouse: Howard Goodman (m. 1949; died 2002)
- Website: Official website

Vestal Goodman (December 13, 1929 – December 27, 2003) was a singer who performed in the Southern gospel genre for more than half a century. She was known for her work as a solo performer and as a member of the Happy Goodman Family—which originated with her husband and his brothers and sisters—one of the pioneering groups in southern gospel music.

== Early life and marriage ==
Goodman was the fourth of six children, and she began singing in church as a child. Raised inside the Church of God, her original intent was to study for the Metropolitan Opera but being raised in church she felt compelled to sing gospel music.

She married Howard Goodman, a preacher eight years her senior, on November 7, 1949. They had a son Rick, and a daughter Vicki. They pastored churches and sang for congregations across the country. Along with Howard's two brothers Sam and Rusty, they became known as The Happy Goodman Family, helping pave the way for Southern gospel music during the 1960s.

== Career ==
With the formation of Word Records in the early 1960s, Vestal and The Happy Goodman Family were the flagship artists signed to the company. In 1969, she won the first ever Female Vocalist of the Year Dove Award. As a natural step in her career, Vestal Goodman released her first solo album, "Hallelujah!" in 1971, from which came the well-known single, "It'll All Be Over But the Shoutin'".

Her autobiography, Vestal! 'Lord I Wouldn't Take Nothin' For My Journey Now', was published in 1999. It details her life in Southern gospel music, her heart problems, her subsequent bout with cancer and her struggle with prescription drug addiction. The Happy Goodmans won multiple Grammy and Dove awards, charted 15 No. 1 hit songs including "I Wouldn't Take Nothin' For My Journey Now," and performed more than 3,500 concerts, including performing at the White House for President Jimmy Carter in 1979.

Goodman was honored by being named "The Queen of Southern Gospel Music", which was proclaimed in a wide array of magazines, from Rolling Stone, Billboard Magazine, Time, People, and The Singing News. She was also known for her trademark handkerchief, which she held in her hand during virtually every performance, sometimes waving it over her head. Comedian/singer Mark Lowry used to joke, "The anointing's in the hanky," during their Gaither Homecoming concert appearances.

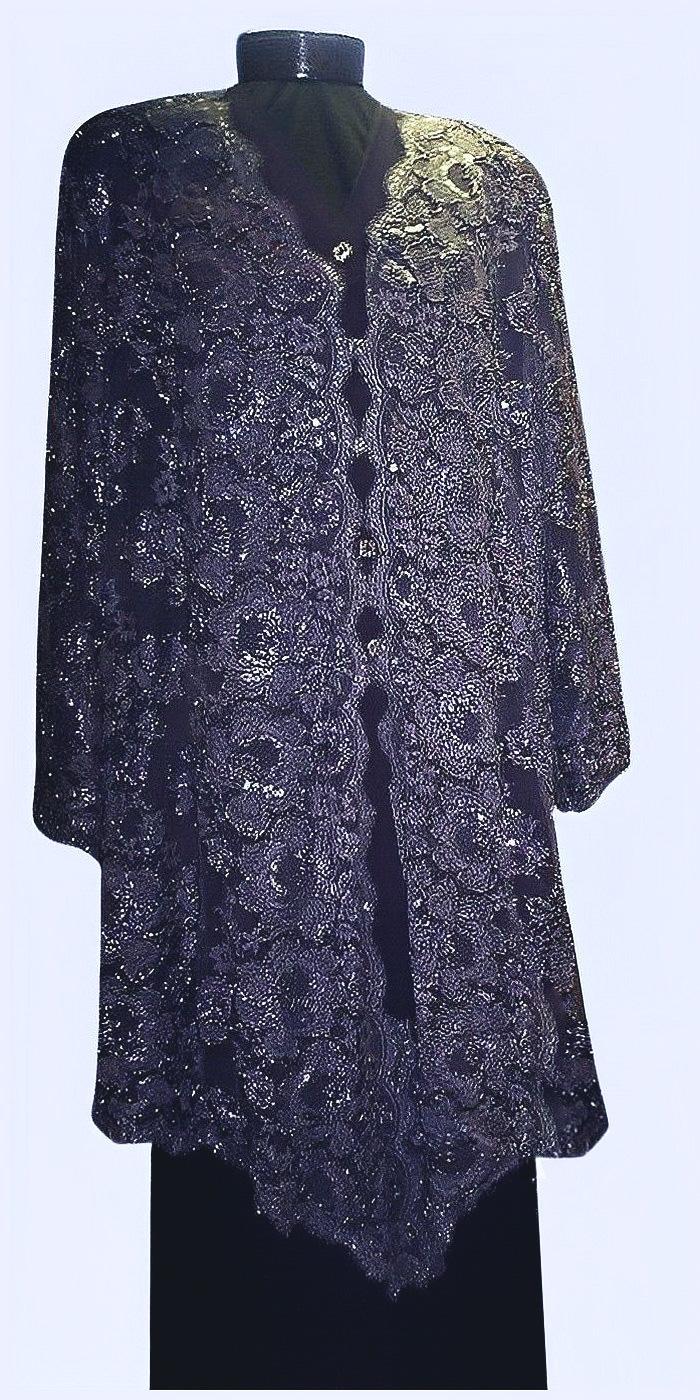
Dress worn by the late Vestal Goodman on display at the Southern Gospel Museum and Hall of Fame in Dollywood Theme Park

A portion of Alabama Highway 75 near Vestal Goodman's birthplace of Fyffe Alabama is designated "Vestal Goodman Highway".

She and Howard worked with many well-known musicians on the Gaither Homecoming music projects in the 1990s. She was posthumously inducted into the Gospel Music Association (GMA) Hall of Fame in 2004. The Happy Goodmans group was inducted into the GMA Hall of Fame in 1998.

== Death and legacy ==
Howard Goodman died on November 30, 2002, after the couple made a farewell recording and singing tour dubbed "The Final Stand."

Vestal Goodman died at the age of 74 of complications from influenza while on Christmas vacation in Florida with her family. She died in an ambulance on the way to the hospital in Celebration, Florida. Her son Rick said it was very appropriate for her death that it would happen in a place called Celebration.

Worthington Music Group and Goodman Family Ministries partnered to release a collection of recordings from the family archive entitled Unsurpassed Masters Vol. 1 in 2008. The critically acclaimed album gives listeners a behind-the-scenes glimpse into the ministry of Howard and Vestal Goodman.

== Discography ==
Title	Details
Hallelujah!	Released: 1971; Label: Canaan Records; Formats: LP
Moments	Released: 1998; Label: Crown Music Group; Formats: Cassette, CD, Streaming
Vestal & Friends	Released: 1999; Label: Pamplin Records; Formats: Cassette, CD, Streaming
Vestal & Friends II	Released: 2000; Label: Pamplin Records; Formats: Cassette, CD, Streaming
The Gift Of Love	Released: 2003; Label: New Haven Records; Formats: CD, Streaming
A Lifetime Of Favorites	Released: 2004; Label: New Haven Records; Formats: CD, Streaming
