= National Register of Historic Places listings in Carroll County, Georgia =

This is a list of properties and districts in Carroll County, Georgia that are listed on the National Register of Historic Places (NRHP).

This National Park Service list is complete through NPS recent listings posted December 19, 2025.

== Current listings ==
	Name on the Register	Image	Date listed	Location	City or town	Description
1	Banning Mills Industrial Archeological District		December 22, 2025 (#100012416)	East of Main St/GA-16, largely centered on Banning and Horseshoe Dam roads. and roughly bounded by Snake Creek; 33°31′48″N 84°55′16″W	Whitesburg vicinity	
2	Bonner-Sharp-Gunn House	Bonner-Sharp-Gunn House	May 13, 1970 (#70000198)	University of West Georgia campus 33°34′17″N 85°05′53″W	Carrollton	
3	Bowdon Historic District	Bowdon Historic District	December 8, 2009 (#09001056)	Roughly centered along Georgia State Route 166 and Georgia State Route 100; 33°32′17″N 85°15′12″W	Bowdon	
4	Burns Quarry	Burns Quarry	August 29, 1977 (#77001539)	Address Restricted	Carrollton	
5	Carroll County Courthouse	Carroll County Courthouse	September 18, 1980 (#80000985)	Newnan and Dixie Sts. 33°34′46″N 85°04′22″W	Carrollton	Built in 1928
6	Carrollton Downtown Historic District	Carrollton Downtown Historic District	May 1, 2007 (#07000378)	Roughly around downtown sq. and is bounded by Johnson Ave., White St., Mill St. and Barnes St. 33°34′48″N 85°04′26″W	Carrollton	
7	Dorough Round Barn and Farm	Dorough Round Barn and Farm	January 20, 1980 (#80000986)	N of Hickory Level on Villa Rica Rd. 33°41′07″N 84°59′18″W	Hickory Level	
8	Eric Vernon Folds House	Eric Vernon Folds House	August 24, 2005 (#05000902)	1575 GA 16; 33°38′10″N 85°02′16″W	Carrollton	
9	Lawler Hosiery Mill	Lawler Hosiery Mill	January 26, 2005 (#04001558)	301 Bradley St. 33°34′40″N 85°04′34″W	Carrollton	
10	Dr. James L. Lovvorn House	Dr. James L. Lovvorn House	May 19, 1988 (#88000595)	113 E. College St. 33°32′18″N 85°15′11″W	Bowdon	
11	Mandeville Mills and Mill Village Historic District	Mandeville Mills and Mill Village Historic District	April 19, 2006 (#06000287)	Roughly centered on Aycock, Lovvorn, and Burson Sts. 33°34′46″N 85°05′19″W	Carrollton	
12	McDaniel-Huie Place	McDaniel-Huie Place	May 24, 1990 (#90000803)	1238 SR 166 W. 33°32′36″N 85°16′35″W	Bowdon	
13	North Villa Rica Commercial Historic District	North Villa Rica Commercial Historic District	December 31, 2002 (#02001635)	Roughly bounded by Southern Railroad, North Ave., and East Gordon and West Church Sts. 33°43′56″N 84°55′30″W	Villa Rica	
14	South Carrollton Residential Historic District	South Carrollton Residential Historic District	June 28, 1984 (#84000947)	Roughly bounded by RR tracks, Harmon and West Aves., Bradley, Mill and Garrett Sts., Tillman and Hill Drs. 33°34′32″N 85°04′20″W	Carrollton	
15	U.S. Post Office	U.S. Post Office	April 18, 1983 (#83000185)	402 Newnan St. 33°34′48″N 85°04′21″W	Carrollton	
16	Veal School	Veal School	December 22, 2005 (#05001427)	2753 Old Columbus Rd. 33°26′08″N 85°13′55″W	Roopville	
17	Whitesburg Baptist Church	Whitesburg Baptist Church	October 22, 2002 (#02001220)	662 Main St. 33°29′35″N 84°54′50″W	Whitesburg	
18	Williams Family Farm	Williams Family Farm	March 25, 2005 (#05000193)	55 Goldworth Rd. 33°42′12″N 84°56′36″W	Villa Rica	
