= Rex Nelon =

American gospel singer (1932–2000)

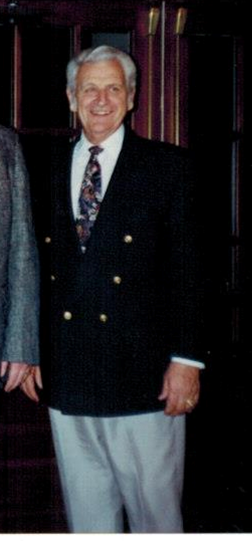
- Nelon in 1992

Background information
- Born: Rex Lloyd Nelon; January 19, 1932; Asheville, North Carolina, U.S.
- Died: January 24, 2000 (aged 68) London, England
- Genres: Southern gospel
- Occupation: Singer
- Years active: 1955–2000

Rex Lloyd Nelon (January 19, 1932 – January 24, 2000) was an American southern gospel musician, with a career spanning over 40 years of both singing and publishing gospel music. He was a longstanding member of The LeFevres, which later became The Nelons after his family took over management. Nelon was also a featured singer in the Gaither Homecoming series.

== Early life ==
Nelon was born in Asheville, North Carolina, to Howard and Marietta Nelon. At age 14, he won his first singing contest. On Monday nights, he attended a weekly singing class where he was taught to read shaped note music and began to develop a solid ear for singing bass. In time, he was singing with regional groups. He would serve in the U.S. Marine Corps in the early 1950s.

== Career ==
In 1955, Nelon was hired to sing bass with the Homeland Harmony Quartet. In 1957, he joined the LeFevres, one of the legendary family groups of southern gospel music. In 1975, he assumed the direction of The LeFevres, which eventually became known as the Rex Nelon Singers, now called the Nelons. Nelon mentored his daughter Kelly Nelon who continued to carry on the family traditions by heading the group, The Nelons. It was from the early Rex Nelon Singers that the careers of Janet Paschal and Karen Peck began to take shape. Nelon is the father of Kelly Nelon Clark and Todd Nelon. Kelly and her two daughters Amber Nelon Thompson and Autumn Nelon Streetman sang with their family southern gospel group The Nelons.

In 1980 and 1982, he was voted by the Singing News Fan Awards as the "Favorite Bass Singer" and also he was named "Mr. Gospel Music". In 1998, he was inducted into the Gospel Music Hall of Fame with the LeFevres. The following year in 1999, he was inducted into the Southern Gospel Museum and Hall of Fame. Nelon's publishing catalog is a collection of some of gospel music's all-time favorite songs such as "O What a Savior", "Come Morning", "The Love of God", "The Old Country Church", "Hide Me Rock of Ages", "Sweeter as the Days Go By", "Thanks", and "If We Never Meet Again".

Nelon along with his group recorded over 25 projects and received 5 Dove Awards, 3 NARAS Grammy nominations and many Singing News Fan Awards. They have appeared on the Grand Ole Opry, "Music City Tonight", "The 700 Club" and numerous national television shows. They are credited with over 13 "Top Five" radio singles. In 1987, the Nelons received the Short Form Music Video of the Year Award for "Famine In The Land", as well as winning the New York Film Festival Award that same year. In 1997, the mayor of Atlanta declared May, "Nelons Appreciation Month". Later that year, they were presented the Silver Angel Award for "Glad You're Here", by the Excellence in Media.

Nelon died on January 24, 2000, of a heart attack at the age of 68, the night prior to the Gaither London Homecoming taping.
