= Autumn Nelon Streetman =

American actress and vocalist (born 1997)

- Born: Autumn Lynn Thompson; January 20, 1997 (age 29)
- Occupation: Southern gospel vocalist
- Years active: 2010—present
- Known for: The Nelons; Gaither Homecoming
- Spouse: Jamie Streetman (m. 2023)
- Children: 1
- Mother: Kelly Nelon Clark
- Relatives: Rex Nelon (grandfather)

Autumn Nelon Streetman (born January 20, 1997) is an American southern gospel vocalist.

== Background ==
Born Autumn Thompson, she is the daughter of Jerry Thompson and Kelly Nelon Clark. After the divorce of her parents in 1998, Nelon Streetman grew up with her sister, her mother, and stepfather, Jason Clark. Her grandfather was Rex Nelon, a gospel singer.

Nelon Streetman began performing with her family's vocal band, The Nelons, in 2010 when she was 13 years old. It was at this time that she debuted her solo, I Choose To Live, from the group's album, Beside Still Water. She sings in the alto range and plays the mandolin. As a primary member of The Nelons, she is featured on all of the group's albums as a soloist and was as well as during their tours. Nelon Streetman was nominated for Best Musician in 2023 by the Absolutely Gospel Music Awards in 2023. At the 67th Annual Grammy Awards, she was nominated for the Grammy Award for Best Roots Gospel Album for The Nelons album Loving You. She married singer Jamie Streetman in 2023. The couple have a son. Alongside her family, she appeared on an episode of Family Feud in 2024.

When Nelon Streetman's mother, stepfather, sister, and brother-in-law were killed in a private plane crash in July 2024, she was left as the sole survivor of her immediate family. The Nelons were scheduled to perform as a group with other southern gospel and Christian singers and musicians on a week-long Gaither Homecoming cruise to Alaska which originated in Seattle. She and her husband had arrived by commercial plane in Seattle on July 26, 2024, the same day of the plane crash (a Pilatus PC-12) which took the lives of her four family members, along with three others also on the aircraft. Nelon Streetman and her husband were told about the crash when they arrived at their hotel.

In an interview with Woman's World, she said, “We (Autumn Nelon Streetman and her husband) chose to fly commercial because we were flying from here (Nashville) and I didn't want to drive to Georgia to get on a plane.” In the same articles she talked about her uncle, Todd Nelon. She says that he would track the flights the family was on. “We (Nelon Streetman and her family) were on that plane—the same plane that they were on—two weeks prior to this going to D.C. It was a short flight, maybe an hour and a half and he tracked us then. He'll get on Flight Tracker where he can see where we are and how much longer we’ve got to go. He was doing the same thing that day. He said, ‘I was watching them and all of a sudden it just went away, and I couldn't figure out why.’”

"I do want to take the time to say thank you all for the outpouring love you have sent my family,” Nelon Streetman wrote. “I don't know how to even sing without my family standing by my side but If there's one thing that I am sure of, is that God is still good, even in moments where I feel absolutely weak and not sure how to go on, He's been faithful.“ In Woman's World she said “This was not something that I would ever imagine that would happen, and I joke and say that they left the one here that was less likely to do any of this by myself. But now I ask God, ‘What do you want me to do? What is my purpose in life? What is your calling on my life now? I know what I'm called to do and that is to sing, but how do I do that now when my family is not here beside me?‘... I'm just waiting on Him.”

== Discography ==
Albums (with The Nelons, a partial listing)

- 2014: Hymns: The A Capella Sessions (With The Nelons)
- 2016: Stronger Together EP (With The Nelons)
- 2016: Family Harmony (With The Nelons)
- 2016: A Nelon Family Christmas (With The Nelons)
- 2017: The Americana Sessions (With The Nelons)
- 2018: A Winter Carol (With The Nelons)
- 2020: Peace At Last (With The Nelons)
- 2022: We Need A Little Christmas (With The Nelons)
- 2023: Beautiful (With The Nelons)
- 2024: Loving You (With The Nelons)
- 2025: My Song (Solo)
