= Kelly Nelon Clark =

American actress and vocalist (1959–2024)

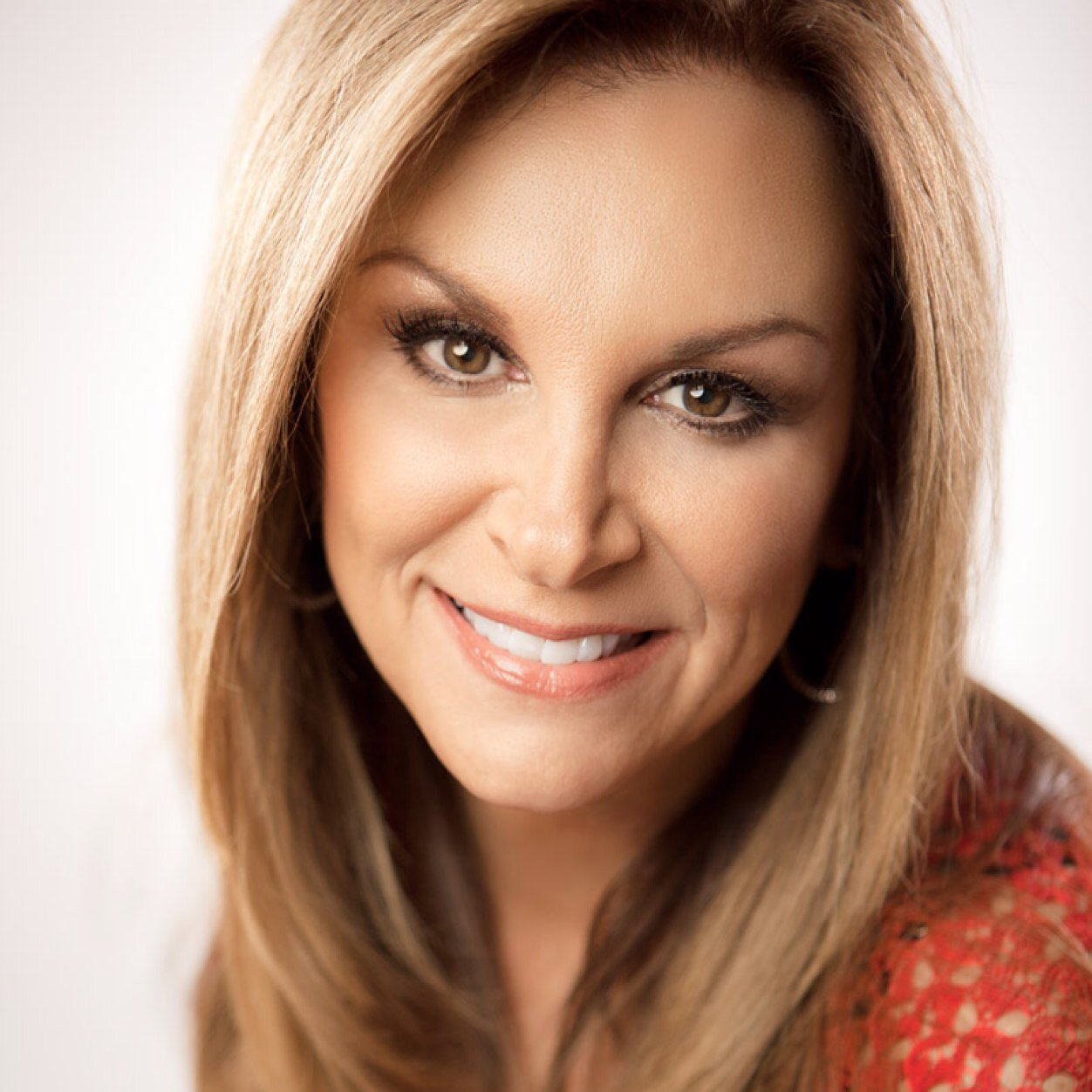
- Nelon Clark in 2016
- Born: Kelly Nelon; December 1, 1959; Atlanta, Georgia, U.S.
- Died: July 26, 2024 (aged 64); Campbell County, Wyoming, U.S.
- Occupations: Inspirational Christian and southern gospel vocalist
- Years active: 1977–2024
- Known for: The Nelons, Gaither Homecoming
- Spouse(s): Jerry Thompson (m. 1979; div. 1998) Jason Clark (m. 2001; their deaths 2024)
- Children: 2 (including Autumn Nelon Streetman)
- Parent: Rex Nelon (father)
- Awards: Singing News Fan Award for Favorite Female Singer (1980, 1981, 1982, 1988) Singing News Fan Award for Favorite Alto (1987, 1990) GMA Hall of Fame (2016; as a member of the Nelons)

Kelly Nelon Clark (December 1, 1959 – July 26, 2024) was an American inspirational Christian and southern gospel vocalist.

Nelon was the head of the family singing group known as the Nelons. The group was inducted into the Gospel Music Hall of Fame in 2016. She had continued the Nelon singing name after her father, gospel singer Rex Nelon.

Nelon won Singing News Fan Awards in the categories of Favorite Alto and Favorite Female Vocalist in 1980, 1981, 1982, 1987, and 1990. She was associated with Bill Gaither's Homecoming events. In 2017, she released a memoir titled “Coffee with Kelly; Reflections of Hope and Humor”.

She and six others including her husband and daughter died on July 26, 2024, after their private plane crashed into a remote area in Campbell County, Wyoming.

== Life and career ==
The daughter of gospel music singer Rex Nelon and his wife Shirley (née Reeves), Kelly Nelon and her brother, Todd Nelon, were raised in Smyrna, Georgia.

When she was a teenager, Nelon Clark was invited to join the southern gospel group the LeFevres. When the group disbanded in the late 1970s, she became part of her father's southern gospel group, the Rex Nelon Singers. Following his death in 2000, she remained with the group, singing alto, and changing the group's name to The Nelons. At the time of her death, Nelon had been with the group for more than 40 years.

She recorded solo albums while traveling with the Nelons, including Her Father's Child in 1983, Praise Him Now in 1985, Called by Love in 1988, KNT in 1990, and Steadfast Heart in 1992.

Nelon Clark appeared on television in Resurrection and Homicide Hunter, where she played the role of Carol Parmer. She also starred in the films The Old Rugged Cross and His Love Is Blind. Kelly also co-hosted the national cable network and syndicated southern gospel music series, "Sing Out America" as well as performing on the program as a semi-regular with the Rex Nelon Singers and as a soloist, beginning in 1981 and continuing into the early 90's.

== Personal life ==
Nelon Clark was married to Jerry Thompson, the former lead singer of the Nelons, for almost 20 years. The couple divorced in 1998. Together, they had two daughters, Amber and Autumn. Nelon Clark remarried in 2001 to Jason Clark, who became the new lead singer of the Nelons.

Both of Nelon Clark's daughters became members of the Nelons, with Amber singing soprano beginning in 2002 and Autumn singing alto, as well as 2nd soprano, beginning in 2014.

=== Death ===
Kelly Nelon Clark, husband Jason, daughter Amber, and son-in-law Nathan Kistler were among the seven people killed in a plane crash on Friday July 26, 2024, in a remote area of Campbell County, Wyoming, just north of Gillette, Wyoming. The plane and passengers were en route to Seattle, Washington to embark on a Gaither Homecoming cruise to Alaska. Also killed in the crash were Nelon Clark's assistant, Melodi Hodges, pilot Larry Haynie, and Haynie's wife, Melissa Haynie.

At the time of their deaths, Nelon Clark and her husband lived in the Atlanta area. There, she and her husband owned and operated "Venue 1074", a farm with a wedding and event location in Roopville, Georgia.

On August 6, 2024, a memorial service for Nelon Clark and her family members lost in the crash was held at Roopville Road Baptist Church in Roopville, Georgia. The service was live-streamed on YouTube. Music during the service was provided by the Isaacs, the Gaither Vocal Band, Karen Peck Gooch, Janet Paschal, Michael English, and Charlotte Ritchie. Remembrances of the Nelons were offered by Bill Gaither, Gloria Gaither, Todd Nelon, Bruce Snead, Dave Kistler as well as the church's pastors, Billy Wood and Stephen Peeples.

== Discography ==
=== Solo albums ===
- 1983: Her Father's Child
- 1985: Praise Him Now
- 1988: Called by Love
- 1990: KNT
- 1992: Steadfast Heart

=== With the LeFevres ===
- 1975: Experience the LeFevres
- 1976: Gospel Music U.S.A.
- 1977: Sing Your Request
- 1977: Singing 'Till He Comes

=== With the Rex Nelon Singers ===
- 1977: I've Never Been This Homesick Before
- 1977: The Sun's Coming Up
- 1978: Live
- 1979: Feelings
- 1980: Expressions of Love
- 1980: One More Song
- 1980: Sing the Gospel
- 1981: One Step Closer
- 1982: Feeling at Home
- 1983: We Shall Behold the King
- 1984: The Best & a Whole Lot More

=== As the Nelons ===
- 1985: In One Accord
- 1986: Journeys
- 1987: Thanks
- 1988: Get Ready
- 1989: Let the Redeemed Say So
- 1990: The Best of Times
- 1991: One Less Stone
- 1991: A New Generation
- 1992: Right on Time
- 1993: Kelly Nelon Thompson & the Nelons
- 1994: A Promised Reunion
- 1994: He's My Comfort
- 1994: Triumphant
- 1995: Hallelujah Live
- 1996: We're Glad You're Here
- 1997: We've Got to Praise Him
- 1997: Thanks Live
- 1997: All Rise Live
- 1998: Peace Within the Walls
- 1999: A Journey
- 2000: Following After
- 2001: Season of Song 1 Nelon Classics
- 2002: United for Christ
- 2003: Season of Song 2
- 2004: The Light of Home
- 2008: You Are God
- 2010: Beside Still Waters
- 2011: Come On Home
- 2012: Evening in December
- 2014: Hymns: The A Capella Sessions
- 2016: Stronger Together EP
- 2016: Family Harmony
- 2016: A Nelon Family Christmas
- 2017: The Americana Sessions
- 2018: A Winter Carol
- 2020: Peace at Last
- 2022: We Need a Little Christmas
- 2023: Beautiful
- 2024: Loving You (the final album that Nelon Clark appeared on, released posthumously shortly after her death)

=== Guest appearances on other albums ===
- 1985: First Call - An Evening in December, song "Evening in December""
