= Veal School =

- U.S. National Register of Historic Places
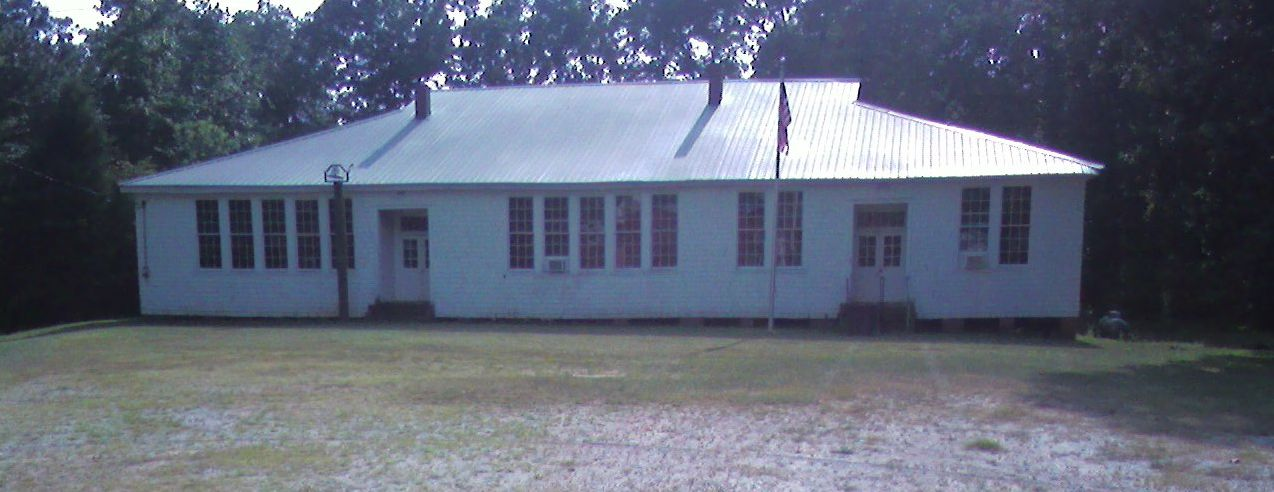

- Location within Georgia Location within the United States
- Nearest city: Roopville, Georgia
- Coordinates: 33°26′8″N 85°13′55″W
- Area: 1 acre (0.40 ha)
- Built: 1900
- NRHP reference No.: 05001427
- Added to NRHP: December 22, 2005

The Veal School near Roopville, Georgia was built in 1900 and expanded in 1929. It served as a school until 1949. Since then it became used by its community. It was listed on the National Register of Historic Places in 2005.

It is a one-story building with cedar shingles and four classrooms. The 1929 expansion added hallways between the classrooms and an auditorium.

The auditorium was used for roller skating on Friday nights beginning in 1954. It has also been used for movies, meetings, concerts, theatre, sports and fundraisers. It was deeded by the Carroll County Board of Education to the community in 1955.
