= 2024 Gillette Pilatus PC-12 crash =

Aviation accident in Wyoming, United States

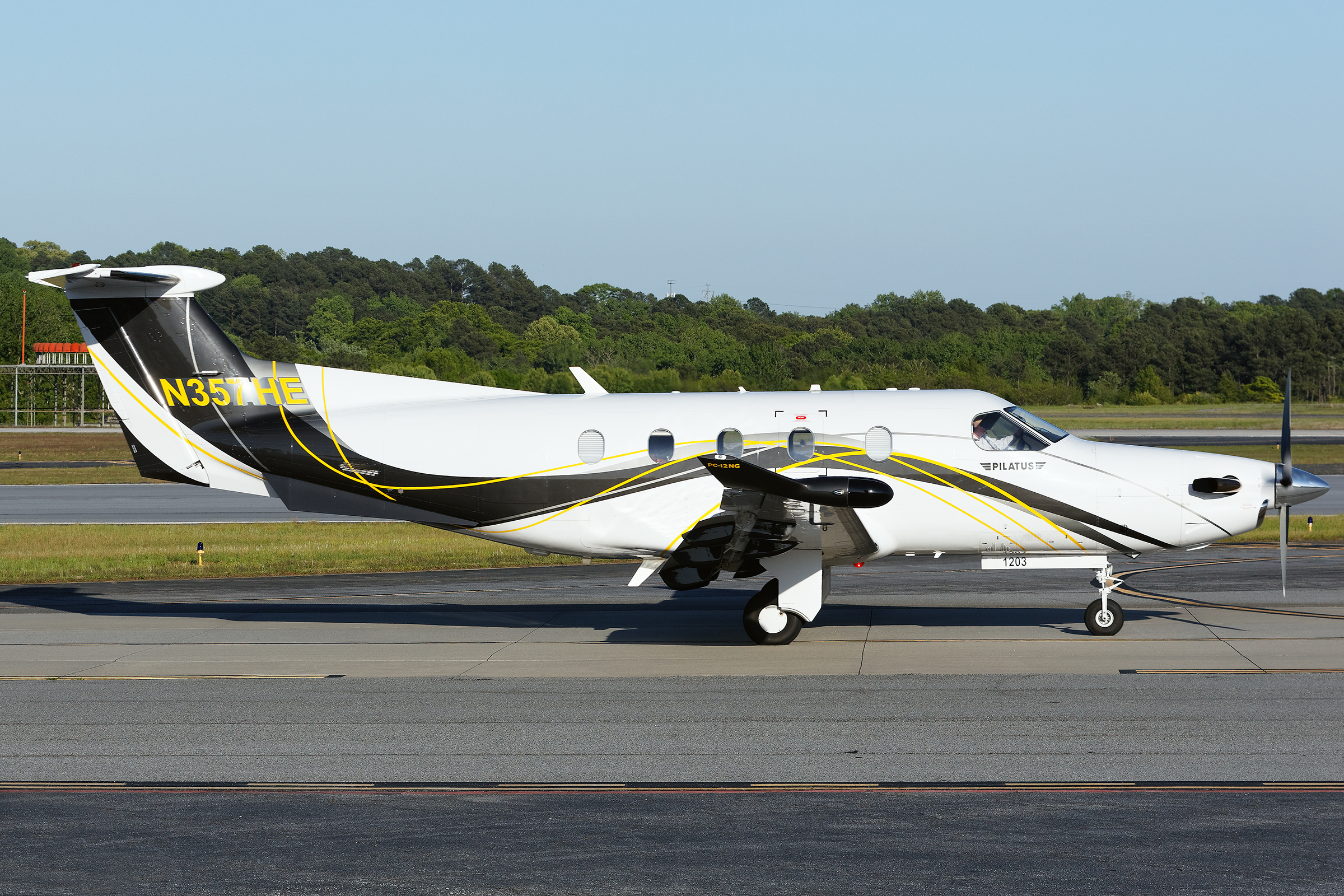
- N357HE, the aircraft involved in the accident, photographed in 2018

Accident
- Date: July 26, 2024
- Summary: Autopilot failure leading to loss of control and in-flight breakup
- Site: North of Gillette, Campbell County, Wyoming, U.S.

Aircraft
- Aircraft type: Pilatus PC-12/47E
- Operator: Haynie Enterprises Inc
- Registration: N357HE
- 1st stopover: Nebraska City Municipal Airport, Nebraska City, Nebraska, United States
- Last stopover: Billings Logan International Airport, Billings, Montana, United States
- Destination: Seattle, Washington, United States
- Occupants: 7
- Passengers: 6
- Crew: 1
- Fatalities: 7
- Survivors: 0

On July 26, 2024, a Pilatus PC-12 single-engine aircraft with seven people on board crashed near the Wyoming–Montana border just north of Gillette, Wyoming, United States. All seven on board died upon impact. Three members of the gospel quartet the Nelons—vocalist Kelly Nelon Clark, her husband Jason, and her daughter Amber—as well as the pilot, Georgia Department of Corrections chairman Larry Haynie, were among the deceased. The crash started a wildfire which was quickly contained by firefighting crews.

== Aircraft ==
The aircraft involved was a Pilatus PC-12/47E, MSN 1203, registered as N357HE. The aircraft, manufactured by Pilatus Aircraft in 2010, was equipped with a Pratt & Whitney Canada PT6A-67P engine.

== Victims ==
The victims of the crash were the Nelons vocalists Kelly Nelon Clark, Jason Clark, and Amber Clark Kistler, Amber's husband Nathan Kistler; the group's assistant, Melodi Hodges; pilot Larry Haynie, and his wife Melissa Haynie. Those on the plane were en route to join a Gaither Homecoming specialty cruise to Alaska (The Nelons were to participate as performers). They were first flying to SeaTac to begin the cruise. Autumn Nelon Streetman (Kelly Clark's daughter and Amber Kistler's sister) was pregnant with Rhett James Streetman (eventually born December 1, 2024) at the time, and her husband Jamie Streetman were traveling separately on another flight.

At the time of his death, pilot Larry Haynie was the board chairman for the Georgia Department of Corrections, the state prison agency.

== Crash ==
About 1 p.m. Mountain Time in Campbell County, Wyoming, a Pilatus PC-12/47E single-engine aircraft crashed north of Gillette, about 223 miles (359 km) north of Cheyenne, the capital of Wyoming. The crash started a wildfire which firefighters contained to an area smaller than one square mile. After the fire was extinguished, crews remained on site for a time to watch for hotspots and reignition.

Initial reports indicated that an "auto pilot issue during flight" contributed to the crash. A representative said that investigators would travel to the crash site to examine the aircraft and wreckage before removing it for transport to an investigative facility.
