= The Nelons =

American southern gospel group

- Also known as: The Rex Nelon Singers (until 1985)
- Origin: Georgia
- Genre: Southern gospel
- Years active: 1977—2024
- Website: thenelons.com

The Nelons, formerly the Rex Nelon Singers, were an American southern gospel group based in Atlanta, Georgia. Members included Kelly Nelon Clark, her husband Jason Clark, and Kelly's daughters Amber Nelon Kistler and Autumn Nelon Streetman. The Nelons were inducted into the Gospel Music Association (GMA) Hall of Fame in 2016.

Three members of the quartet, Kelly Nelon Clark, Jason Clark and Amber Nelon Kistler, died in an airplane crash in a remote part of Campbell County, Wyoming, just north of Gillette in July 2024. The surviving member, Autumn Nelon Streetman, was not on board.

== History ==
The Nelons were started by Rex Nelon as The Rex Nelon Singers in 1977. The group was a spin-off of the family group The Lefevres. They became known as The Rex Nelon Singers in 1976 because the Lefevre family members left the group. The group's first number-one song was "Come Morning" on the Singing News Chart, and was awarded the Southern Gospel Song of the Decade for the 1980s. Another widely recognizable song by the group is "We Shall Wear a Robe and Crown."

Over time the group included Karen Peck, Janet Paschal, Jerry Thompson, Charlotte Ritchie, Kelly Nelon Clark, Todd Nelon, Jeff Stice, Martin Gureasko, Rodney Swain, Stan Whitmire, Ray Fisher, Vernon Lee.

The Nelons have been nominated for many awards in the southern gospel music industry including Grammys, Dove Awards, Singing News Awards, Absolutely Gospel Awards, Diamond Awards, and Christian Voice Awards.

In 2014, the Nelons were a trio made up of Kelly Nelon Clark, Jason Clark, and Amber Nelon Thompson. In 2014, Amber was chosen as Female Vocalist of the Year at the Absolutely Gospel Music Awards. Kelly Nelon Clark, Jason Clark, and Amber Nelon Kistler died in a plane crash on July 26, 2024. The Nelons' final album, Loving You, was posthumously released on August 30, 2024.

== Personnel ==
=== Member History ===
- Rex Nelon – bass (1977–1999)
- Kelly Nelon Clark – alto (1977–1991; 1993–2024)
- Rodney Swain – lead (1977–1984)
- Janet Paschal – soprano (1977–1981)
- Jerry Thompson – tenor/lead (1977–1992, 1993–1998)
- Todd Nelon – bass guitar, lead/baritone (1979–1995)
- Ray Fisher – piano (1980–1986)
- Karen Peck – soprano (1981–1990)
- Stan Whitmire – pianist (1986, 1993–1996)
- Brian Beatty (1980s)
- Martin Gureasko – pianist (1990–1992)
- James Gordon – bass guitar/drums (1990–1991)
- Gary Eubanks - bass guitar (1991-1992)
- Charlotte Ritchie – soprano (1991–1993, 1994–1996)
- Kelly Benton – soprano (1992–1994)
- Amy Roth – soprano (1996–1999)
- Monica Moore (Deer) - soprano (1999)
- Melody Williams – soprano (1999–2001)
- Katy Peach (then Katy VanHorn) – soprano (2001–2002)
- Amber Nelon Kistler – soprano (2002–2024)
- Paul White – lead (1992–1993)
- Tammy Britton – alto (1991–1993)
- Mickey Bell – piano (1997–2000)
- David Hill – lead (1998–1999)
- Paul Lancaster – tenor (1999–2001)
- Jason Clark – lead, bass guitar (1995–2024)
- Dan Clark – bass (1999–2002)
- Kevin Davis – piano (2000–2012)
- Danny Crawford – piano (portions of 1986 and 1987)
- Autumn Nelon Streetman – soprano (2014-2024)

== Discography ==
Albums:

as Rex Nelon Singers

- 1977: The Sun's Coming Up
- 1978: Live
- 1978: I've Never Been This Homesick Before
- 1979: Feelings
- 1980: Expressions of Love
- 1981: Sing The Gospel
- 1981: One More Song
- 1981: One Step Closer
- 1982: Feeling At Home
- 1983: We Shall Behold The King
- 1984: Precious Old Story of Love
- 1984: I've Got My Foot On The Rock

As The Nelons

- 1985: In One Accord
- 1986: Journeys
- 1987: Thanks
- 1988: Get Ready
- 1989: Let The Redeemed Say So
- 1991: One Less Stone
- 1991: A New Generation
- 1992: Right On Time
- 1993: Kelly Nelon Thompson & The Nelons
- 1994: A Promised Reunion
- 1994: He's My Comfort
- 1994: Triumphant
- 1995: Hallelujah Live
- 1996: We're Glad You're Here
- 1997: We've Got To Praise Him
- 1997: Thanks Live
- 1997: All Rise Live
- 1998: Peace Within The Walls
- 1999: A Journey
- 2000: Following After
- 2001: Season of Song 1 Nelon Classics
- 2002: United for Christ
- 2003: Season of Song 2
- 2004: The Light of Home
- 2008: You Are God
- 2010: Beside Still Waters
- 2012: Come On Home
- 2012: Evening in December
- 2014: Hymns: The A Capella Sessions
- 2016: Stronger Together EP
- 2016: Family Harmony
- 2016: A Nelon Family Christmas
- 2017: The Americana Sessions
- 2018: A Winter Carol
- 2020: Peace At Last
- 2022: We Need A Little Christmas
- 2023: Beautiful
- 2024: Loving You

Compilations

- 1984: Best & Whole Lot More
- 1990: The Best of Times
- 1997: Timeless Collection
- 1998: The Collection
- 1998: Out Front – Best of Rex Nelon

Kelly Nelon solo

- 1983: Her Father's Child
- 1985: Praise Him Now
- 1988: Called By Love
- 1990: KNT
- 1992: Steadfast Heart

== Accolades ==
- 1999: Rex Nelon — Southern Gospel Museum and Hall of Fame inductee
- 2013: People Choice Silver Telly Award — "Excuse Me Are You Jesus"
- 2016: Gospel Music Hall of Fame inductee
- 2024: Kelly Nelon Clark — Southern Gospel Museum and Hall of Fame inductee
