= Dorough Round Barn and Farm =

- U.S. National Register of Historic Places
- Location within Georgia Location within the United States
- Location: Hickory Level Road
- Nearest city: Hickory Level, Georgia
- Coordinates: 33.701235°N 84.968505°W
- Area: 196 acres (79 ha)
- Built: 1917; 109 years ago
- Built by: Lovell, Floyd
- NRHP reference No.: 80000986
- Added to NRHP: January 20, 1980

The Dorough Round Barn and Farm near Hickory Level, Georgia in Villa Rica, Georgia is a 196-acre (79 ha) property that includes a round barn built in 1917. The barn is actually 14-sided, which approximates round. The property was listed on the National Register of Historic Places in 1980. The listing included five contributing buildings and another contributing structure.

The property was deemed significant in the agricultural history of Georgia, as the round barn was an attempt to introduce new methods to increase productivity. The farm had remained in the Dorough family for generations. Its round barn was one of just four known to survive in Georgia in 1979.
