= Williams Family Farm =

- U.S. National Register of Historic Places
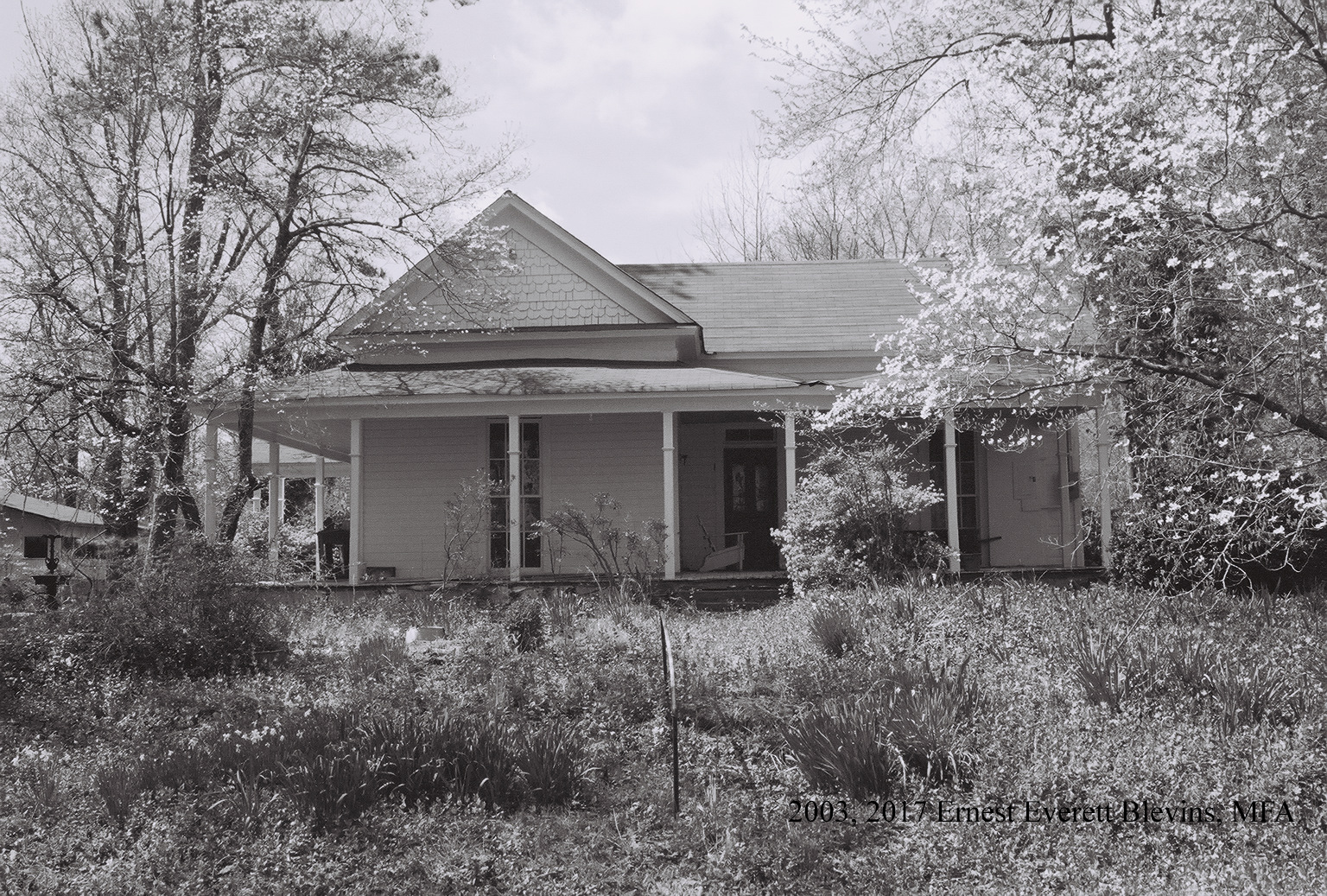

- Location within Georgia
- Location: 55 Goldworth Rd., Carroll County, Georgia, near Villa Rica, Georgia
- Coordinates: 33°42′12″N 84°56′36″W
- Area: 10.8 acres (4.4 ha)
- Built: 1891
- Architectural style: Folk Victorian
- NRHP reference No.: 05000193
- Added to NRHP: March 25, 2005

The Williams Family Farm, in Carroll County, Georgia near Villa Rica, was built in 1891. It has also been known as the Goldworth Farm. It was listed on the National Register of Historic Places in 2005. The listing included seven contributing buildings, six contributing structures, 11 contributing sites, and a contributing object.

The mission of the farm and museum is "To preserve and interpret farm life in Carroll County and the West Georgia region for the public, providing educational and recreational programs and research opportunities in partnership with local educational and governmental entities."

It is located at 55 Goldworth Rd., southwest of Villa Rica, on an old alignment of the unpaved-in-2005 Villa Rica-Carrollton Road, which was bypassed by Georgia Highway 61.

== History ==
The farm was purchased by Joseph Williams in 1887. The farm remained in business through the Great Depression, when the Williams family lobbied for a Civilian Conservation Corp camp on the land. The CCC Camp Lacretia was completed in 1937, and CCC residents worked on soil conservation projects and built furniture. The camp was relocated in the early 1940s, and associated buildings were removed, though stone foundations remain.

The existence of gold on the property was predicted by local lawyer and oracle Mayhayley Lancaster, and when gold was discovered there in 1926, the family changed the name to Goldworth farm.

In the 1950s, the farm shifted from crop farming to dairy production.

In 2005 it was a farm complex with a Folk Victorian-style main house built in 1891, a number of outbuildings, and an extant landscape. It includes an 1891 smokehouse, an 1891 horse barn, and a brick creamery from 1895.

In 2008, the farm was managed by 4th generation stewards of the land and leased for production of timber, wheat, and canola. In 2013, it received recognition as a Georgia Centennial Farm for remaining in production for over 100 years.
