= O What a Savior =

1948 Southern gospel song

"O What a Savior" is a Southern gospel song written by the Free Will Baptist musician Marvin P. Dalton in 1948. The first line is "Once I was straying in sin's dark valley" and the chorus starts "O what a Savior". It was first recorded in January 1950 by the Original Stamps Quartet, a male-voice quartet, accompanied by piano. It was included as the first hymn in the Blackwood Brothers collection Sunday Meeting Songs in 1957. Dalton's works were popular locally in the 1940s and 1950s, and he is also known for his hymn "Looking for a City".

== Sources ==
- Wayne S. Walker (27 October 2020). What A Savior, hymnstudiesblog
- Lewis Willis (1999). "O What a Savior". Truth Magazine Vol. 43
