= Janet Paschal =

American singer (born 1956)

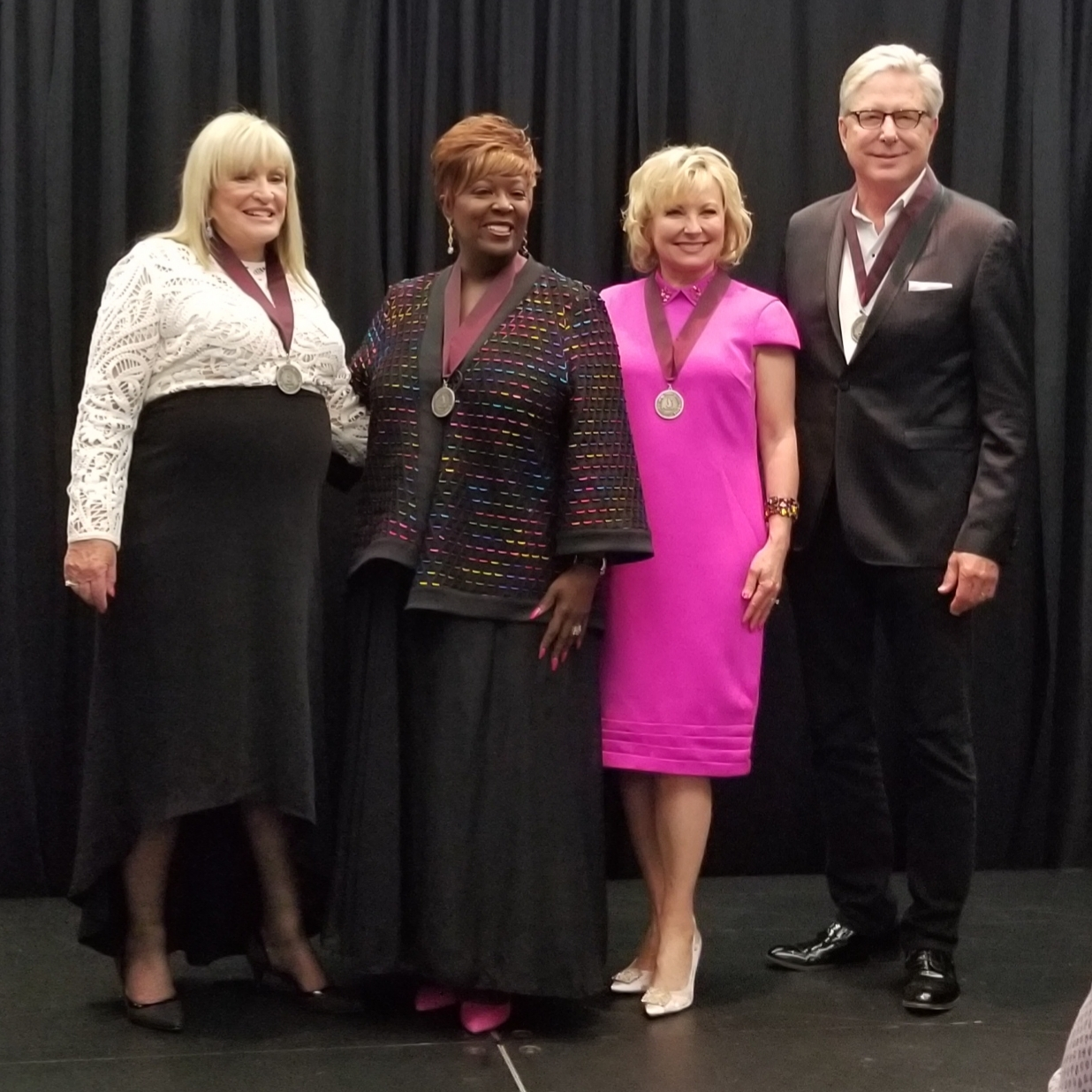
- GMA Hall of Fame, 2019 Inductees: Dottie Leonard Miller, Tramaine Hawkins, Janet Paschal, Don Moen

Background information
- Born: October 18, 1956 (age 70)
- Origin: Reidsville, North Carolina
- Genres: Southern gospel, Inspirational
- Occupations: Singer, musician, songwriter, author
- Instrument: Vocals
- Years active: 1975–present
- Labels: StowTown Records, Vine, Maplesong Music, Spring Hill Music Group, Word, Shiloh
- Formerly of: The LeFevres, The Rex Nelon Singers, Jimmy Swaggart, Bill Gaither
- Website: janetpaschal.com

Janet Paschal (born October 18, 1956) is an inspirational gospel vocalist. She has released numerous albums in that genre and has received multiple fan awards and Grammy and Dove Award nominations. She is also a songwriter and published author. In May 2019, she was inducted into the Gospel Music Association Hall of Fame in Nashville, Tennessee. Paschal was inducted into the North Carolina Music Hall of Fame in October 2022.

== Personal life ==
Paschal was born in Reidsville, North Carolina. Paschal grew up in a musically inclined Christian family; her father and his brothers played bluegrass instruments and sang in area churches as the Paschal Brothers. Paschal's grandfather was a minister who served as an inspiration in her life as she attended his church growing up. As a teenager she, her sister, Kay, and a cousin formed their own gospel singing group called The Gospel Classics. Paschal started her professional career as a vocalist after graduating from high school.

In 1998, Paschal met John Lanier, a commercial airline pilot. They married in 1999 in Reidsville.

Paschal was diagnosed with breast cancer in 2005 and took a year off from touring to undergo chemotherapy and radiation treatments at Duke University Medical Center in Durham, North Carolina.

In 2017, Paschal earned a master's degree with honors in Accounting from the University of North Carolina, Greensboro, as well as induction into the Beta Gamma Sigma international honor society for collegiate schools of business.

== Career ==
At eighteen, Paschal was hired for her first professional singing job, as the featured soprano with The LeFevres, an Atlanta-based family singing group. After two years, the group changed its name to The Rex Nelon Singers. She sang with the group from 1974 to 1981.

In 1982, she was invited to perform as a soloist for televangelist Jimmy Swaggart's international crusades. During her five and a half years with Swaggart, Paschal appeared weekly before 100 million viewers and traveled the world singing at crusades. During this time, she performed for more people worldwide than any other female vocalist in any genre. Paschal also began her solo career, releasing her first album, titled I Give You Jesus, on Swaggart's ministry label, Shiloh Records, in 1984.

In 1987, Paschal began touring full-time as a soloist. She signed with Word Records and began composing songs such as "Another Soldier's Coming Home", "God Will Make A Way", "The Body and Blood", and "If I'd Had My Way". Shortly afterwards she was invited to tour with Bill and Gloria Gaither, and became a featured artist on the Gaither Homecoming Tour.

Paschal's self-titled debut album with Word was nominated for a Dove Award for "Inspirational Album of the Year" in 1990. Her Simple Trust album featured her No. 1 inspirational radio hit "Take These Burdens". Her single "Hide Me Sweet Rock of Ages" was No. 1 on The Singing News Top 80 Chart in August 2009. She has earned multiple Diamond Awards and numerous Grammy nominations, and she is consistently named among Gospel Music's favorite soloists by the genre's top trade magazines.

In 1998, Paschal performed her song "Another Soldier's Coming Home", written as a tribute to her grandfather, upon invitation for the National Memorial Service of First Lieutenant Michael Blassie, the first unknown soldier from the Vietnam War to be exhumed and positively identified.

In 2009, Paschal started a radio program focused on cancer awareness, Walking The Good Road, that aired on more than 30 stations in the U.S. and Canada. She also began the Annual Cancer Walk at Gospel Music's premier weeklong festival NQC.

In May 2019, Paschal was inducted into the Gospel Music Association Hall of Fame in Nashville, Tennessee. It is the association's highest award, recognizing trailblazers that have made a profound impact on Christian & gospel music.

In October 2022, Paschal was inducted into the North Carolina Music Hall of Fame in Kannapolis, North Carolina. The event recognizes the musical legacy of the state’s greatest music makers.

In February 2026, Paschal debuted her first single in 15 years, "In The Fire," from her newest project, The Journey, with StowTown Records. The full album released on October 9, 2026.

== Other work ==
Paschal served as the spokeswoman for an international Christian relief organization "Mission of Mercy", founded by missionaries Mark and Huldah Buntain.

Paschal has written two books:

- 1997: The Good Road (Multnomah), a collection of her own writings and reflections on life, based on the biblical book of Jeremiah;
- 2008: Treasures of the Snow (Maplesong), which chronicles her triumphant battle with cancer and stories from three decades in gospel music. The title of the book is from a passage in the book of Job in which God asks Job if he has seen "the treasures of the snow.”

Paschal was a contributing writer to Homecoming Magazine with a monthly feature called "The Good Road".

== Discography ==
=== With The LeFevres ===
- 1975: Experience The LeFevres
- 1976: Gospel Music U.S.A.
- 1977: Sing Your Request
- 1977: Singing 'Till He Comes

=== With The Rex Nelon Singers ===
- 1977: I've Never Been This Homesick Before
- 1977: The Sun's Coming Up
- 1978: Live
- 1979: Feelings
- 1980: Expressions Of Love
- 1980: One More Song
- 1980: Sing the Gospel
- 1981: One Step Closer
- 1994: Promised Reunion (The Nelons)

=== Solo ===
- 1984: I Give You Jesus (Shiloh)
- 1986: An Evening With Janet Paschal (Shiloh)
- 1986: Janet Paschal LIVE! (Shiloh)
- 1988: Janet Paschal (Word)
- 1990: Language of the Heart (Word)
- 1991: Simple Trust (Word)
- 1994: Journey of Grace (Word)
- 1997: The Good Road (Spring Hill)
- 1998: Sweet Life (Spring Hill)
- 1999: Christmas (Spring Hill)
- 2000: Songs for a Lifetime (Spring Hill)
- 2002: This is Janet (Spring Hill)
- 2004: Home Again (Maplesong Music)
- 2007: Greatest Hits of Janet Paschal (Spring Hill)
- 2007: Sounds Like Sunday (Vine)
- 2007: The Best Of Janet Paschal (Gaither Music Group)
- 2009: Treasure (Vine)
- 2014: Beginnings (Word)
- 2026: The Journey (StowTown Records)

=== Guest appearances on other albums ===
- 1988: Called By Love; "I Will Forever Praise Your Name" with Kelly Nelon and Debra Talley
- 1993: One Special Christmas; David T. Clydesdale "Home for Christmas Medley: I'll Be Home for Christmas/White Christmas"
- 1995: Sisters: The Story Goes On; "Godspeed" with Babbie Mason and Tanya Goodman-Sykes
- 1996: Tribute: The Songs of Andrae Crouch; (various artists) "My Tribute (To God Be the Glory)"
- 1997: Big Band Hymns; Chris McDonald "Let Us Break Bread Together"
- 1997: Lovin' God & Lovin' Each Other; "Tell Me" with Gaither Vocal Band
- 1998: Because He Lives; "It's Beginning To Rain", "Get All Excited"
- 1998: Grateful Hearts; "We Say Thank You"
- 1998: Make Us One; "God Will Make a Way" with Vestal Goodman
- 1999: Vestal & Friends duet with Vestal Goodman on "Friends"
- 2000: Fields Of Grace duet with Kirk Talley on title song
- 2000: Hands of Time; Anthony Burger "What a Savior Medley: What a Savior/He Came To Me/Oh, What a Savior"
- 2002: Homecoming Lullabies; "Between Here And Heaven"
- 2003: It's My Life; Mike Bowling (background vocals)
- 2003: Masterpiece; Anthony Burger "Over the Rainbow"
- 2005: A Tribute To George Younce
- 2009: Homecoming Tributes & Classics; "Daystar"

=== Gaither Homecoming Video solos ===
- 1994: All Day Singin' and Dinner on the Ground; "Lead Me to the Rock", "I Am Not Ashamed"
- 1994: Holy Ground; "Written in Red"
- 1996: Homecoming Texas Style; "Written in Red"
- 1996: Joy to the World; "What Did You Say Was the Baby's Name?"
- 1996: Moments to Remember; "God Rides On Wings Of Love"
- 1996: Ryman Gospel Reunion; "He'll Deliver Me"
- 1996: Sunday Meetin' Time; "I've Never Seen The Righteous Forsaken"
- 1996: This is My Story; "You're Still Lord"
- 1998: Atlanta Homecoming; "Something Got A-Hold Of Me"
- 1998: Down by the Tabernacle; "Tell Me" (with the Gaither Vocal Band)
- 1998: Hawaiian Homecoming; "Born Again", "God Will Make A Way"
- 1998: Marching To Zion; "Another Soldier's Coming Home"
- 1999: Kennedy Center Homecoming; "The Body and the Blood"
- 1999: Mountain Homecoming; "Take This Trial Trip Beside Me"
- 1999: So Glad; "Born Again"
- 2000: 50 Years: The Happy Goodman Family; "Friends"
- 2000: Christmas in the Country; "Sitting by the Fire"
- 2000: Oh, My Glory!; "How Are Things at Home?"
- 2001: Freedom Band; "If I'd Had My Way"
- 2001: What A Time!; "God Will Make A Way"
- 2002: God Bless America; "It's Lucky We Met", "It Won't Rain Always"
- 2002: New Orleans Homecoming; "He'll Deliver Me"
- 2003: Australian Homecoming; "My Soul Is Anchored to the Rock", "I Will Never Leave You Alone"
- 2003: Going Home; "The Unclouded Day" with Kelly Nelon Clark and Karen Peck
- 2003: Heaven; "It's Not About Now"
- 2004: We Will Stand; "When I Survey the Wondrous Cross"
- 2005: Jerusalem; "El Shaddai"
- 2007: How Great Thou Art; "Fairest Lord Jesus"
- 2009: Nashville Homecoming; "It Won't Rain Always"
- 2011: Alaskan Homecoming; "I See a Crimson Stream" with Sheri Easter and Charlotte Ritchie
- 2011: Majesty; "I Shall Wear a Crown"
- 2011: Tent Revival; "Down to the River To Pray" with Charlotte Ritchie
- 2011: The Old Rugged Cross; "Until Then"
- 2012: Gaither Homecoming Celebration; "Born Again"
- 2013: The Women of Homecoming, Volume Two; "Lord I'm Listening"
- 2021: Glorious Church; "What Good Are Love Songs"
- 2026: You Are Loved; "Something Beautiful"
