= Pilatus PC-12 =

Swiss executive and utility transport aircraft

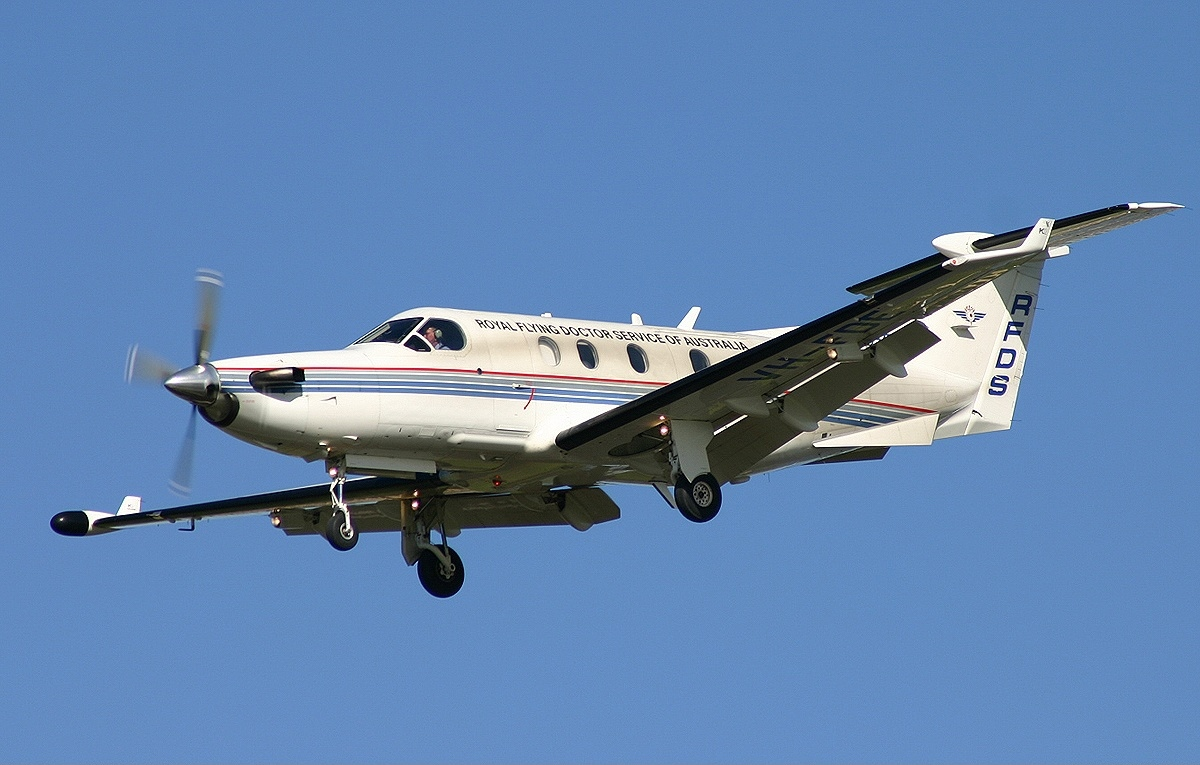
- A PC-12/45 of the Royal Flying Doctor Service, the launch customer and major user

General information
- Type: Passenger and cargo aircraft
- National origin: Switzerland
- Manufacturer: Pilatus Aircraft
- Status: In production
- Primary users: PlaneSense Royal Flying Doctor Service; Tradewind Aviation; United States Air Force
- Number built: 2,000 (as of May 2023)

History
- Manufactured: 1991–present
- Introduction date: 1994
- First flight: 31 May 1991
- Variant: Pilatus U-28 Draco

The Pilatus PC-12 is a pressurized, single-engined, turboprop aircraft manufactured by Pilatus Aircraft of Stans, Switzerland, since 1991. It was designed as a high-performance utility aircraft that incorporates a large aft cargo door in addition to the main passenger door. Due to its efficient, high-utility design, the PC-12 is used by a large variety of operators. The main use for the aircraft is corporate transportation, but it is also used by fractional and small regional airlines, air-ambulance operators, and many government agencies, such as police departments and armed forces. The 2,000th PC-12 was delivered in May 2023.

== Development ==
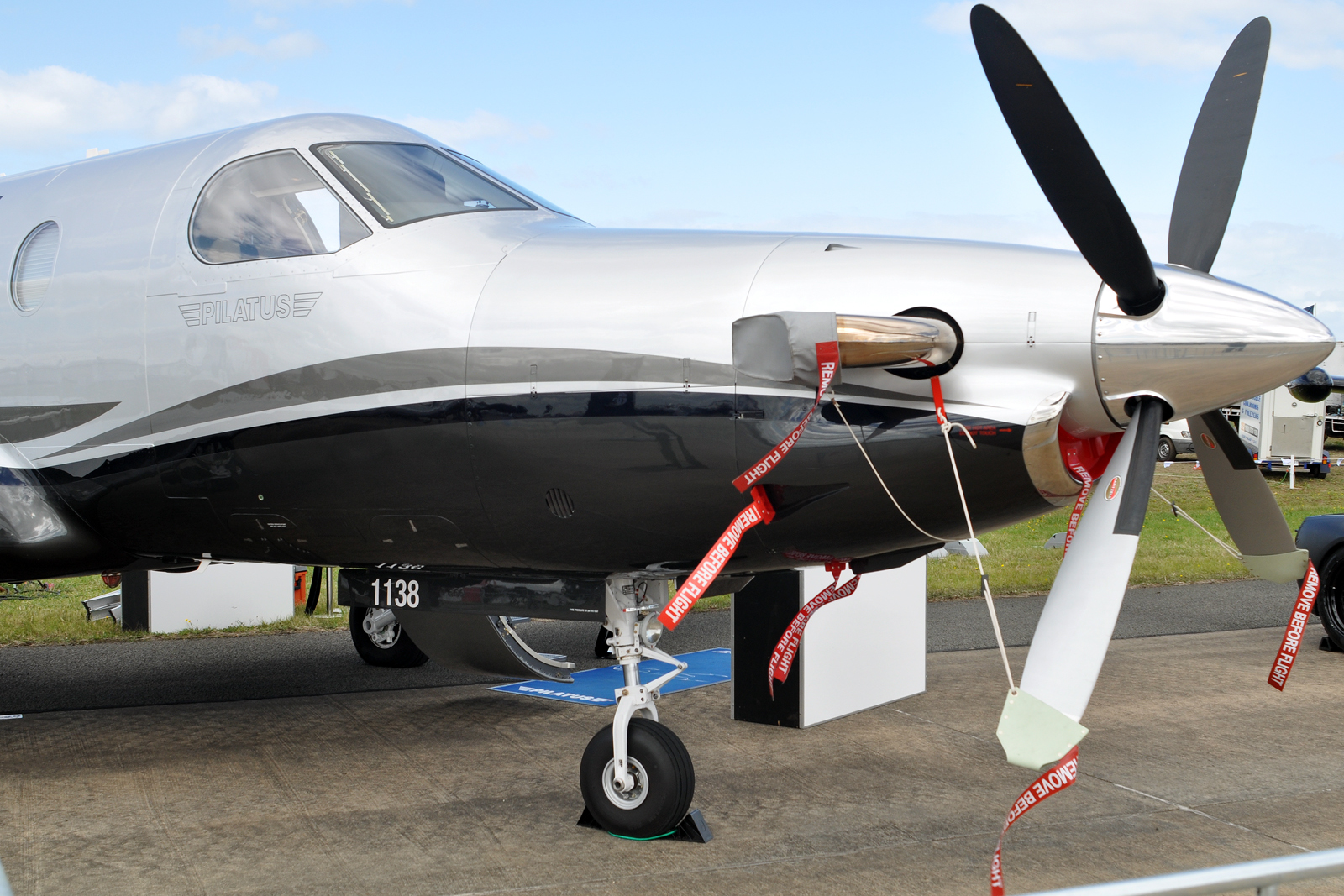
Pratt & Whitney PT6 turboprop nose installation and four-bladed propeller

In October 1989, Pilatus announced the development of the PC-12 at the annual convention of the National Business Aviation Association (NBAA). Prior to the 1989 announcement, the PC-12 project had been worked on for some time under high levels of secrecy; by the time of the announcement, assembly of the first prototype had already commenced. Pilatus believed that the PC-12 would fit a new market not served by existing aircraft and that the type would be the first single-engined aircraft with a large cabin that would be capable of flying at high speeds across long distances. The two prototypes were completed on 1 May 1991, with the first flight taking place on 31 May 1991. Swiss certification of the type had been originally planned for mid-1991, but a redesign of the wings (to increase the wingspan and add winglets to ensure performance guarantees were met) delayed progress. On 30 March 1994, the Swiss Federal Office of Civil Aviation issued the type certificate for the PC-12; Federal Aviation Administration approval in the U.S. followed on 15 July 1994.

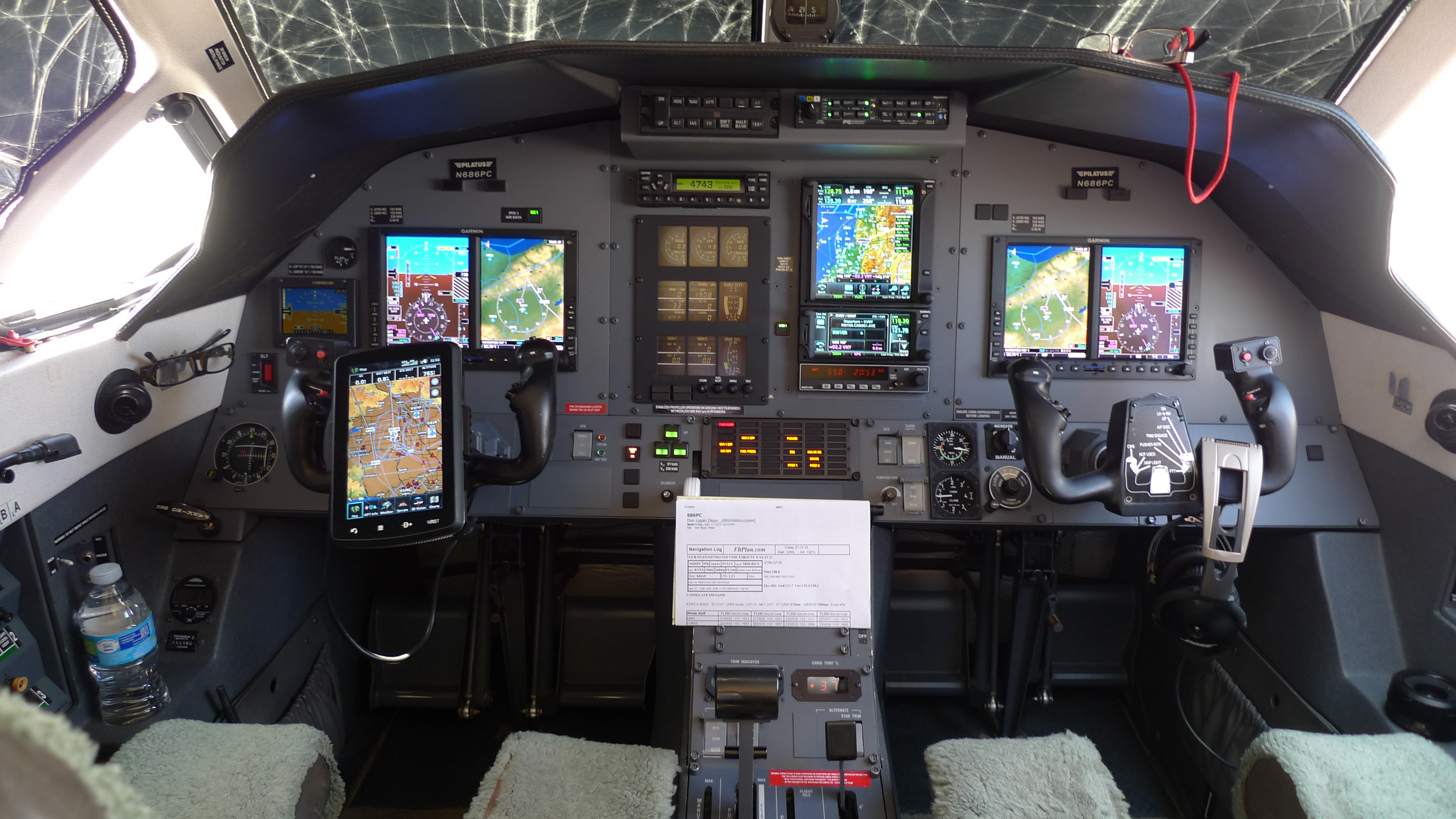
PC-12 with upgraded flight instruments and subpanel

Since entering service, Pilatus developed a large number of improvements and options for the original PC-12 model; changes include increasing the maximum takeoff weight, using increasingly powerful engines, adopting new avionics, incorporating noise-reduction measures, adding new propellers, speed and range increases, additional interiors, and new inflight entertainment systems. Other aviation firms, such as Finoff Aviation Products, have also produced their own independent products and aftermarket enhancement packages for the PC-12.

=== PC-12NG ===
Pilatus announced the PC-12NG (Next Generation) at the 2006 NBAA meeting in Orlando and officially launched it during the NBAA 2007 in Atlanta. The NG features a more powerful Pratt & Whitney PT6A-67P engine with better climb performance and an increase in maximum cruise speed to 280 kn (320 mph) true airspeed (TAS). The NG also features a Honeywell Primus Apex glass cockpit; prior to this, the PC-12 had been one of the few high-end models to lack flat-panel avionics. The revised cockpit includes automatic pressurization control, as well as cursor-controlled inputs to the navigation system. The PC-12 NG winglets have also been modified from the original version. Within two years of launch, over 200 orders reportedly had been placed for the PC-12 NG. In May 2008, the first PC-12 NG was delivered.

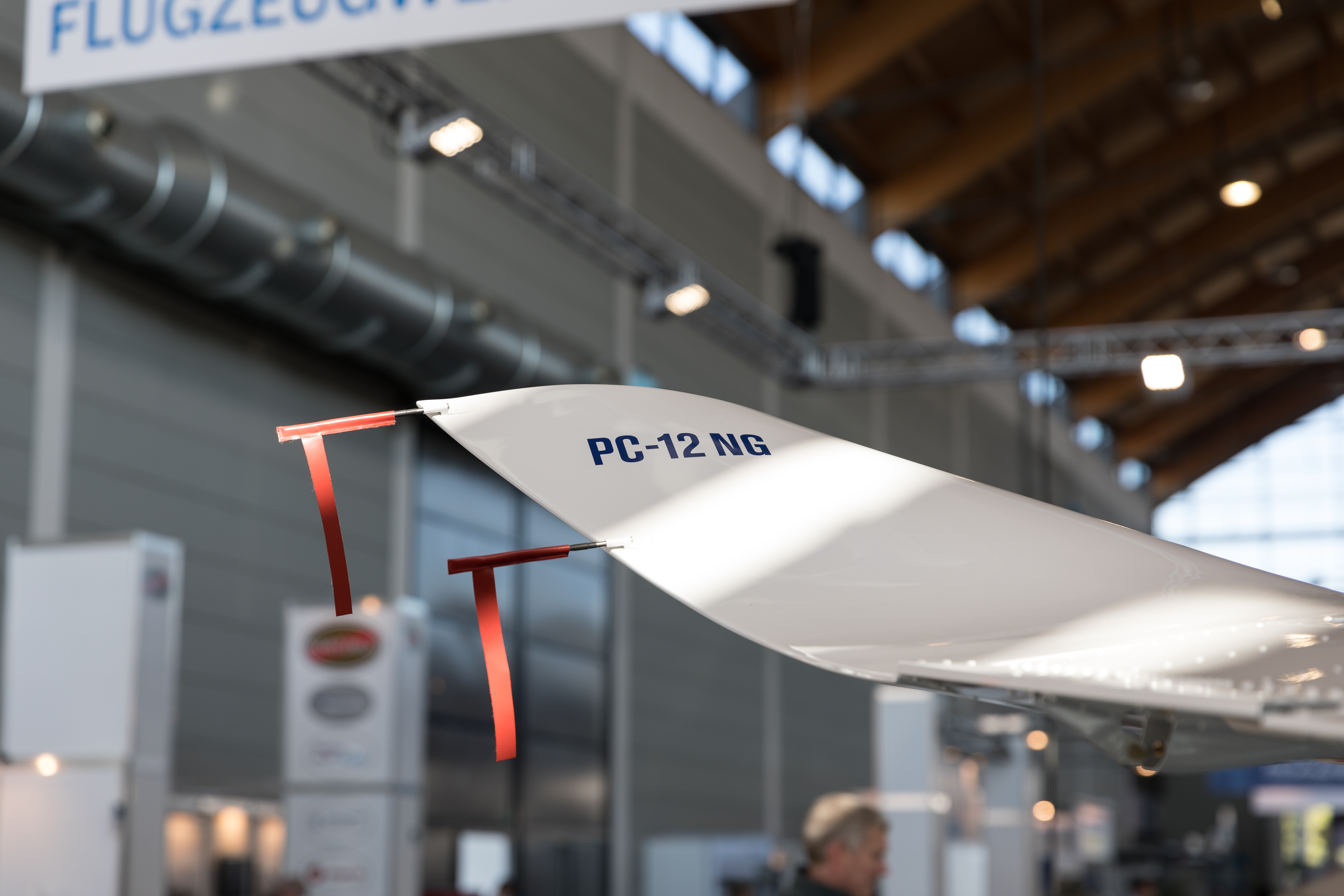
Blended winglet of the PC-12 NG

The PC-12M (Multipurpose) is based on the PC-12 NG, but equipped with a more powerful electrical generation system that allows installing additional power-consuming equipment. This enables the PC-12M to perform missions such as flight inspection, air ambulance, aerial photography, and aerial surveillance. An optional utility door accommodates parachute drops of people and cargo. This version is marketed in the United States as the PC-12 Spectre paramilitary special missions platform.

On 18 December 2012, Pilatus officially opened its Chinese headquarters in Chongqing, Liangjiang, and announced future manufacturing of the PC-12 for Asia-Pacific customers on the production line at this site. In September 2014, the production for various aerostructures for the PC-12 NG were announced to be performed by Tata Aircraft Systems in India from 2016 onwards, these parts having previously been manufactured by PZL-Świdnik in Poland.

=== PC-12NGX ===
At the October 2019 NBAA convention, Pilatus announced the already certified PC-12NGX. Its PT6E-67XP includes a full-authority digital engine control and a low-speed propeller mode to lower cabin noise. It reaches a 290 kn (537 km/h) cruise TAS. Updated Honeywell avionics with autothrottle feature both a cursor control device and a touchscreen. Adapted from the PC-24, the cabin windows are 10% larger and the redesigned cabin includes new seats. Scheduled maintenance is extended to 600 flight hours and time between overhaul increases from 4,000 to 5,000 hours. Deliveries were to start in the second quarter of 2020 at a US$4.39 million base price, up to $5.369 million if typically equipped as an executive aircraft. In 2023, its equipped price was $6.028M.

=== PC-12 PRO ===
On 14 March 2025, Pilatus announced a new version of the PC-12 called the PRO. Delivery was expected to begin in early fall of 2025.

== Design ==
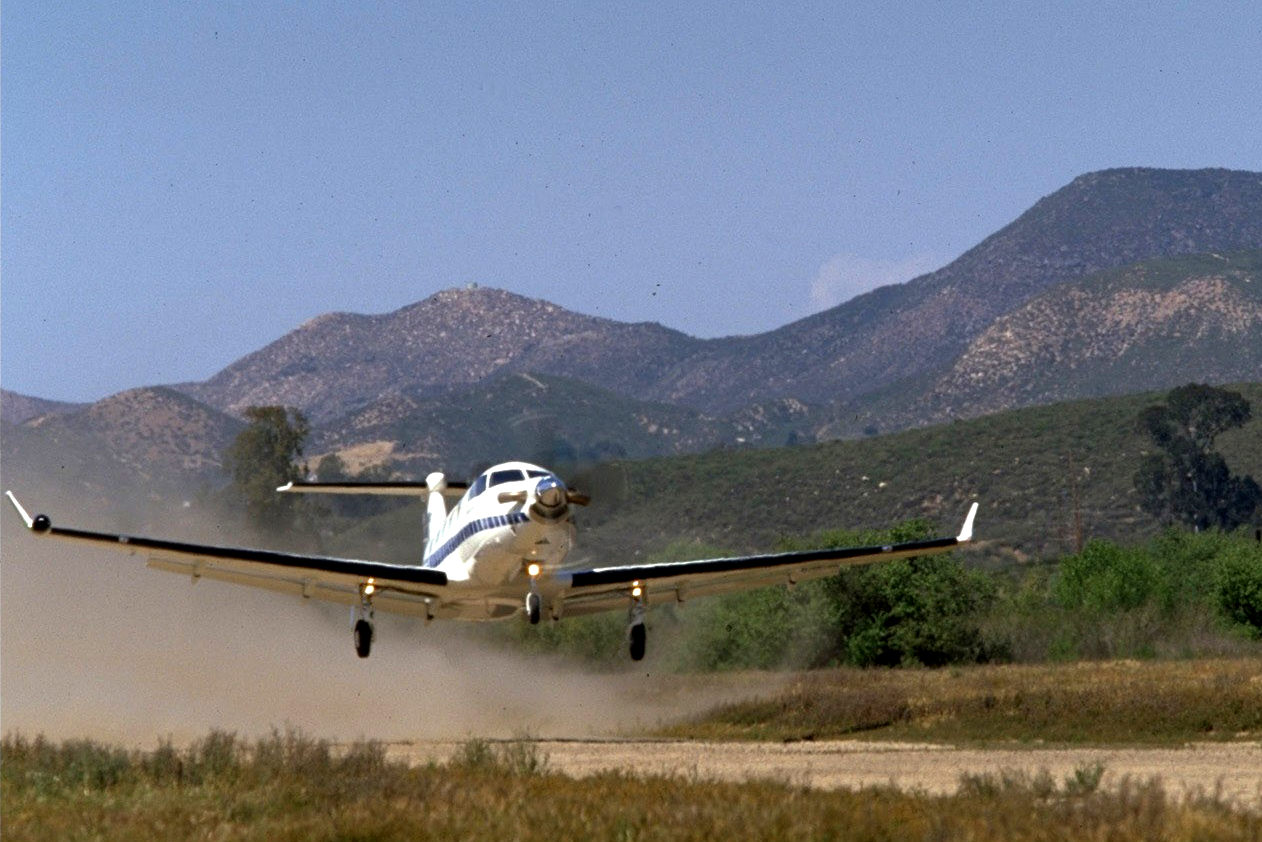
Pilatus PC-12 taking off from a short, unpaved airstrip

The PC-12 is a single-engined, turboprop-powered, business aircraft, designed for performing multiple roles and to deliver performance and safety equal to twin-engined aircraft. It is powered by a single Pratt & Whitney PT6A-67 engine; early models are powered by the PT6A-67B, while the later PC-12 NG variant uses the more powerful PT6A-67P, which is flat rated at only 70% of its maximum power. According to Pilatus, the PC-12 NG has exceptional versatility and is capable of operating within the most rugged environments, such as the Australian outback; it is one of the few pressurized turbine-powered aircraft capable of operating from rough landing strips.

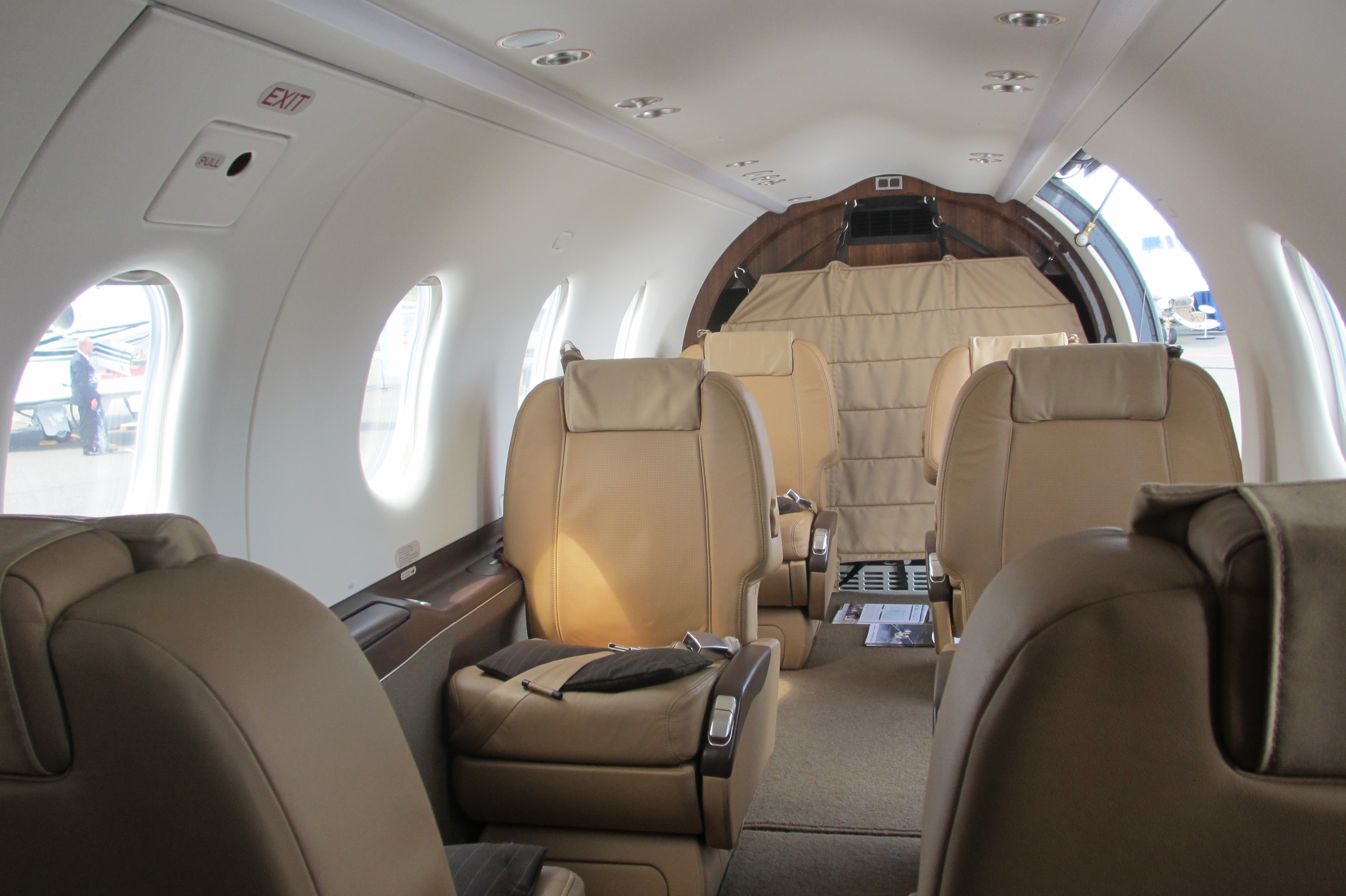
Pilatus PC-12 interior cabin

The cabin can accommodate up to nine passengers and has a refreshment centre, an enclosed lavatory, and a rear baggage area. Other cabin configurations include executive arrangements seating between six and eight passengers, a four-seat passenger-cargo combination layout, and an air ambulance setup housing two litters and three attending medics. The interior was designed in conjunction with BMW's Designworks division, making extensive use of leather, fine wood veneers, and various textiles to create an environment similar to a luxury road vehicle. An atypically large cargo door is installed to accommodate bulky items, including palletised cargo.

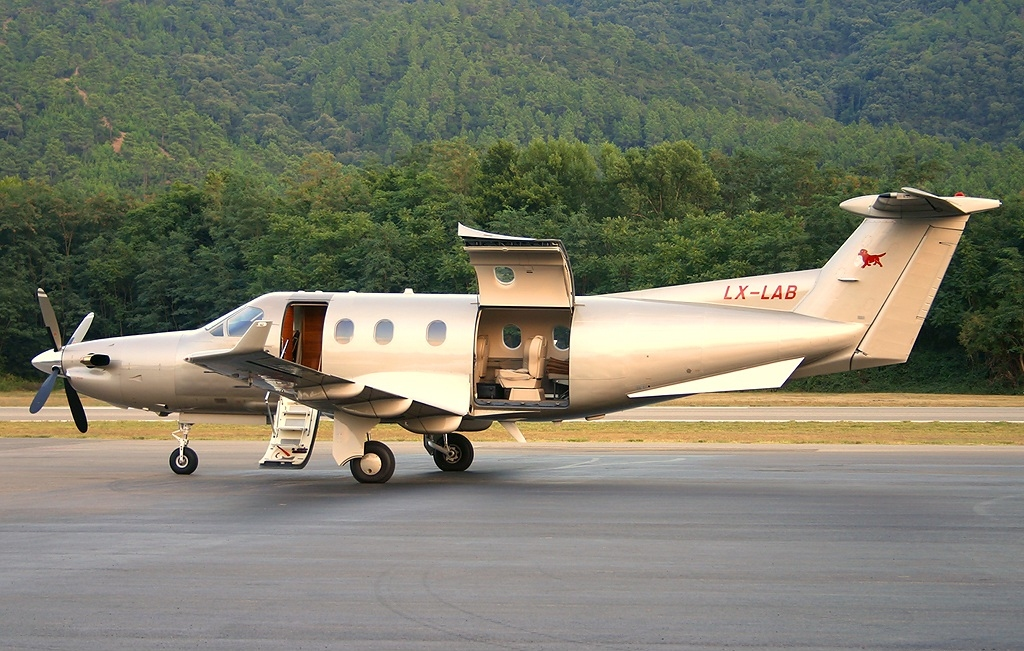
A Luxembourg-registered PC-12/45 with doors open

The PC-12 incorporates numerous safety measures. The PT6A-67 engine has a reputation for considerable reliability, a factor that has reportedly been decisive to some prospective operators. To counteract stall and spin conditions, dual angle-of-attack sensors near the wingtips force the stick forwards in advance of a potential stall. For greater redundancy, the PC-12 NG has a complete split-bus dual electrical system similar to modern jet aircraft, in addition to two separate batteries and a third emergency battery. The type is certified for flight into known ice conditions; as per standard fit, pneumatic deicing systems are installed in the wings and empennage, while electrical deicing measures are integrated into the windshield; exhaust heat is used for engine intake deicing. In 2014, Aviation Week & Space Technology described the PC-12 as possessing "...comparatively slow take-off and landing speeds, excellent short-field performance, and easy handling characteristics."

In addition to its uses as a passenger transport and private aircraft, the PC-12 can be configured as a multimission platform, such as an air ambulance or for conducting surveillance aircraft missions. In the latter role, a retractable electro-optical/infrared sensor may be installed into the aircraft's tail and an operator's console, containing two display monitors, a digital video recorder, communications panel, and expansion bays to accommodate various radios and datalinks, can be fitted in the main cabin area; the aircraft may be highly customized to meet customer's specific mission requirements. In the multimission capacity, the type has seen use by various customers, including the Red Cross, the Royal Flying Doctor Service, the Royal Canadian Mounted Police and the United States Air Force.

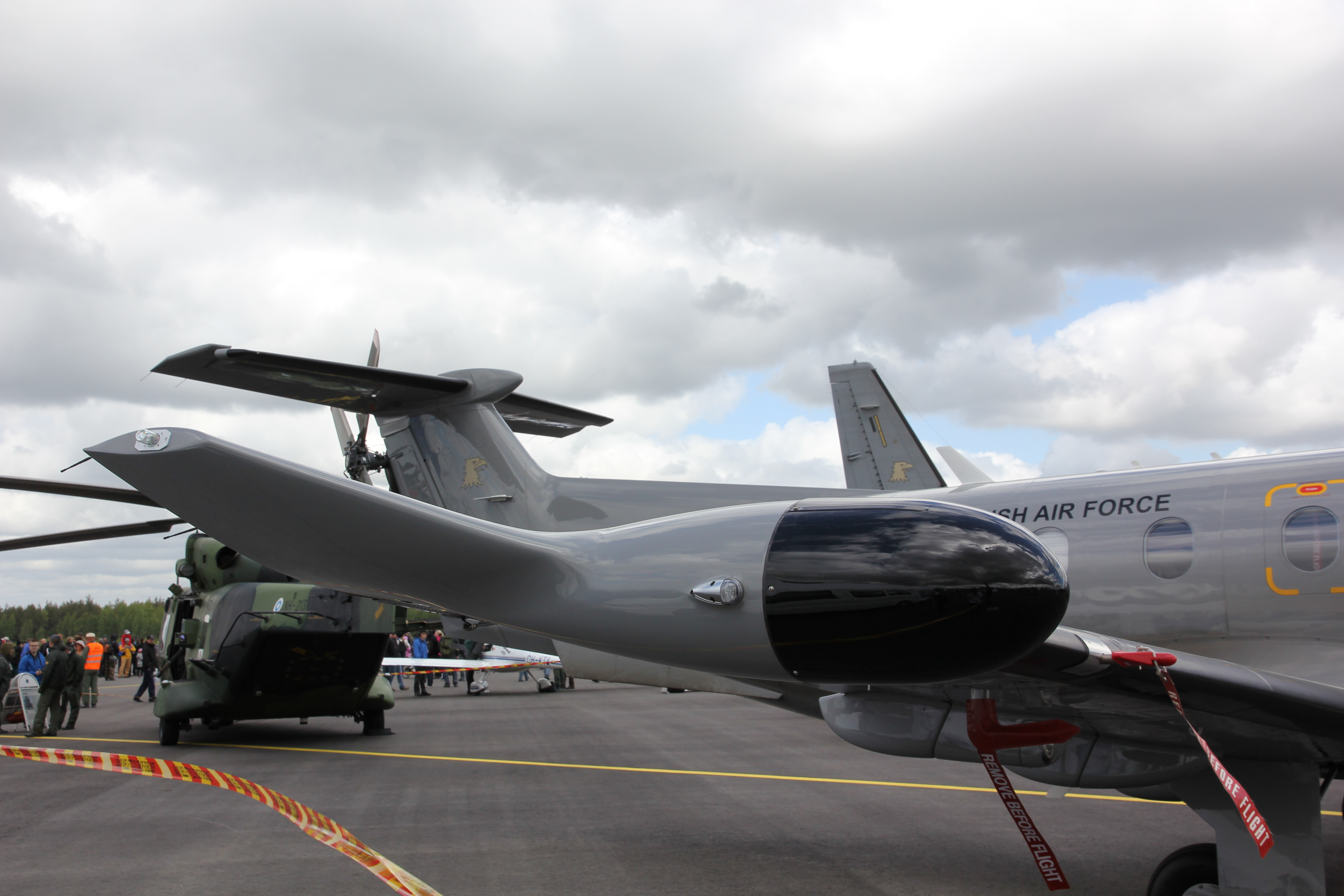
PC-12 wingtip device and weather radar

The type features a three-axis autopilot as standard, while weather radar, long-range navigation systems, and radar altimeter are optional. The flight deck of the PC-12 NG is equipped with Honeywell's Primus Apex avionics system, consisting of four 10-inch, high-resolution, liquid crystal display screens, two of which perform as the primary flight displays directly forward of either pilot, the other two being multifunction displays in a central position between the two pilots. The Apex system shares many similarities to the flight decks of other business jets and has been designed to minimize crew workload and provide for improved safety during single-pilot operations. An advanced synthetic vision system, delivering greater situational awareness and safety during visual flight rules flight, is also present. The cockpit's layout is optimized for ergonomic and aesthetic appeal, providing similar comfort levels for the flight crew as to the passengers. An engine-condition monitoring system is present on the PC-12 NG, automatically monitoring engine parameters and producing relevant warnings, easing preventive maintenance efforts.

In October 2021, Blackhawk Aerospace announced plans to offer an XP67P+ upgrade that would be available for many of the legacy PC-12s. The upgrade was to replace the stock Pratt and Whitney PTA-67B engine with a factory-new PTA-67P, allowing higher ITT limits, 142 shaft horsepower gains, and maximum torque to FL230. All factors would improve the performance of the aircraft, with 25% better climb rates, higher cruise speeds, and several other operational benefits. Blackhawk announced several deposits for their upgrade at NBAA-BACE 2022 and that baseline flight testing has been completed. STC approval for the FAA was to happen second quarter 2023 with EASA certification not long after.

== Operational history ==
=== Commercial, corporate, and private use ===
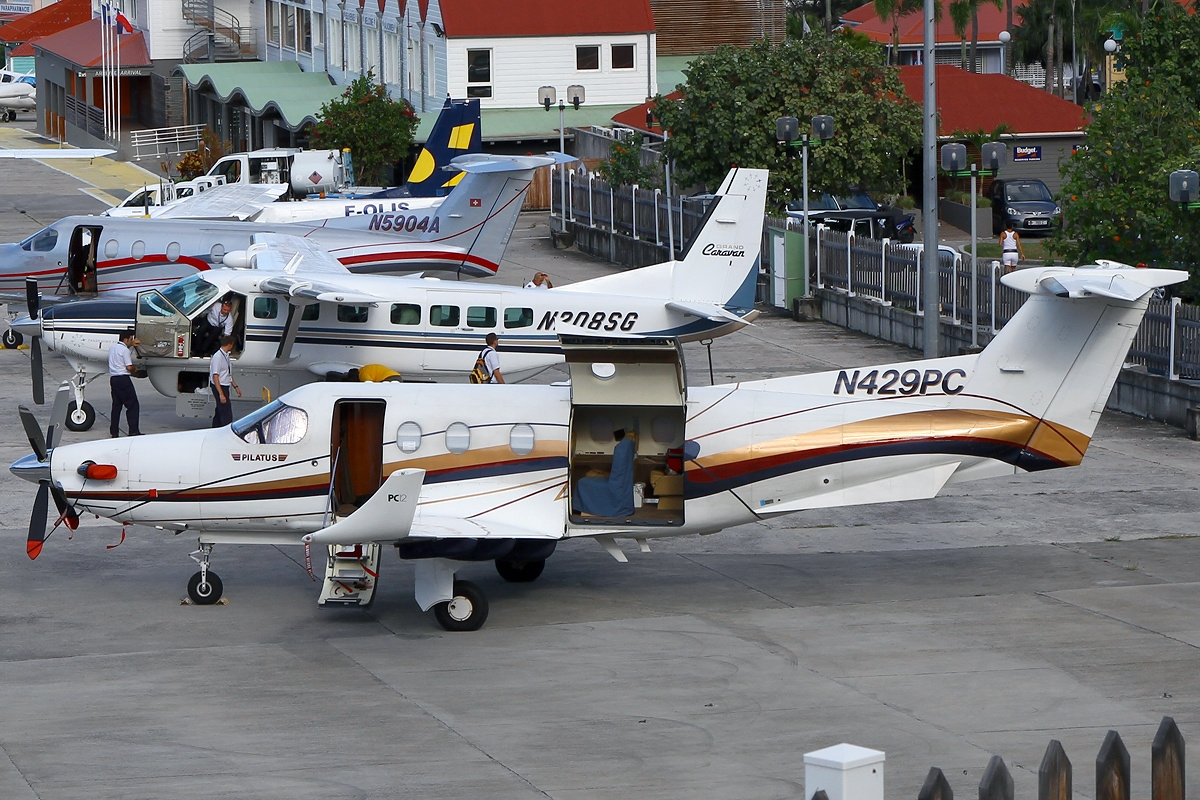
Two PC-12s parked with a Cessna 208 Caravan between them

Early sales of the PC-12 principally went to utility operators, because Pilatus was reportedly uncertain of the sales potential for business and passenger operators. In 1994, the Royal Flying Doctor Service of Australia became the launch customer of the PC-12. It operates 32 PC-12s throughout Australia to deliver medical services in remote areas.

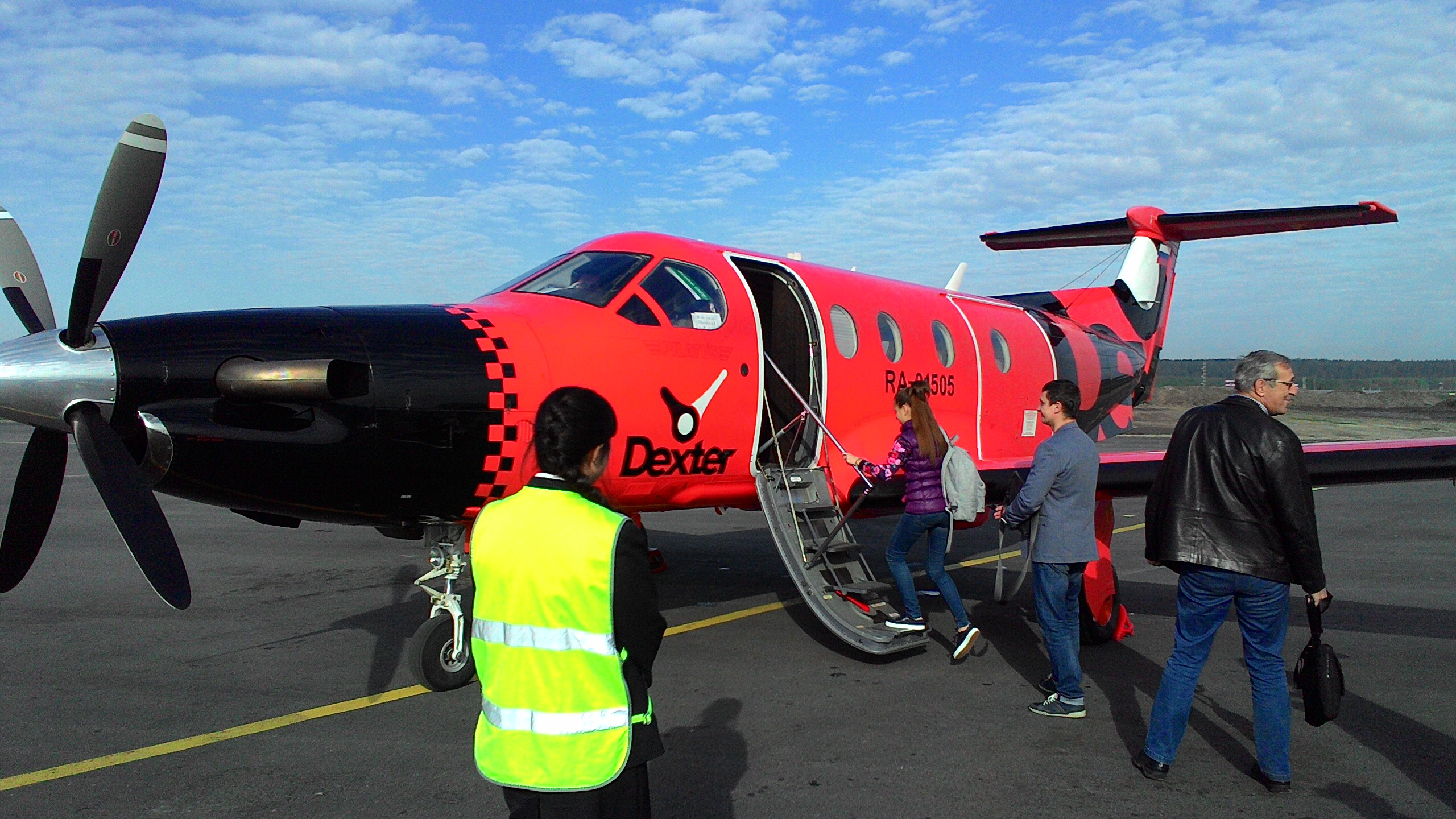
PC-12 with passengers embarking

In 2006, Flying referred to the PC-12 as "...more economical to operate than any turbine airplane of similar size." In 2007, Flying described the high rate of value retention on used PC-12s as "unbelievable"—attributing this to the popular demand for the type. High oil prices are a prominent factor for increasing sales of turboprops, the PC-12 among them.

The bulk of demand comes from North America, and three-quarters of PC-12NG sales are in executive configurations. While its price grew from $3.3 million in 2005 to $4.7 million in 2015, it retains 80-85% of its selling price after 10 years given average use, better than comparable turboprop or business jets, and it sells in 40% less time.

Pilatus also uses a series of overseas distributors to market and sell the PC-12 within designated regions. AMAC Aerospace is the exclusive sales agent for the type within the Middle East.

In August 2014, California airline Surf Air placed an order for 15 PC-12 NGs and 50 options, one of the largest contracts for the type. PlaneSense, a New Hampshire-based fractional ownership company, manages the largest fleet of the type, operating 34 PC-12s as of 2015.

In June 2010, Pilatus announced that the 1,000th PC-12 had been delivered. By August 2013, the worldwide PC-12 fleet had accumulated a combined total of 4 million flight hours and 1,200 PC-12s had been delivered to customers. Just over a year after the 1300th, the 1400th PC-12 was delivered in July 2016. As of July 2016, the fleet had accumulated 5.6 million total flight hours since certification and 1 million flight hours for the 630 PC-12 NG since its introduction in 2008. In May 2018, with the fleet having logged over 6.8 million hours, the maintenance interval was raised from 100/150 hours to 300 and a new maintenance plan reduced labor by 20 to 40% to lower direct operating costs.

By 2017, a nine-year-old PC-12 was worth $2.5-2.8 million and 15- to 16-year-old models had a $1.8 million value. Owner-operators account for 20 to 30% of the PC-12 sales, while they fly 90% of all SOCATA TBMs.

By October 2019, the PC-12 fleet surpassed 1,700 aircraft, with more than seven million total flight hours. By May 2021, 1,800 had been delivered, including 82 in 2020, having flown eight million hours. In May 2023, the fleet reached 10 million flight hours, including 9.3 million landings. A total of 71 PC-12s had flown over 20,000 hours each, with the highest-time aircraft over 35,000 hours. On 12 May, the 2,000th was delivered, as 80 were built in 2022 and Pilatus held a backlog for 63 units, while 1,889 examples were in service and 31 aircraft were in storage.

In 2022, Tradewind Aviation marked a major fleet renewal and expansion program with the purchase of 20 new Pilatus PC-12 NGX aircraft in a deal valued at over $100 million, with deliveries proceeding at three or four per year through 2027. The program cements Tradewind's status as the operator of one of the world's largest fleets of Pilatus PC-12s, and the largest available for charter. Tradewind has operated all variants of the PC-12, beginning in 2003.

=== Military operations ===
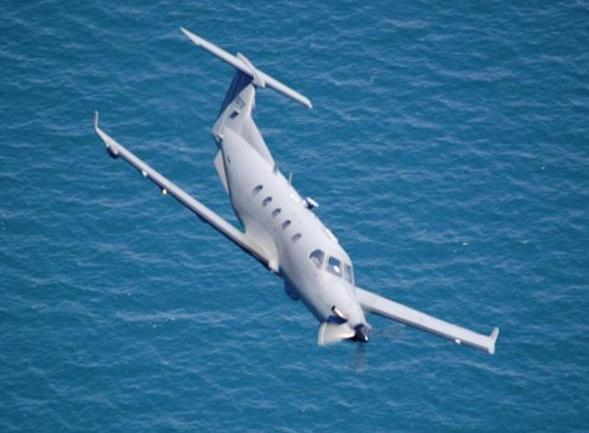
United States Air Force U-28A

The PC-12 is Pilatus' first aircraft directed principally at the civilian market. Despite the company historically being a military-oriented supplier, military sales for the type were considered a low priority during the early stages of development.

The U-28A Draco is the United States Air Force variant of the PC-12 for intratheater support of special operations forces performing the role of intelligence, surveillance, and reconnaissance (ISR). The U-28A is operated by the 319th Special Operations Squadron, stationed at Hurlburt Field, Florida, at the headquarters of the Air Force Special Operations Command. The 34th Special Operations Squadron was activated on 9 April 2010 as the second U-28A unit at Hurlburt Field. Both squadrons operate as part of the 1st Special Operations Wing/ 1st Special Operations Group at Hurlburt Field. The U-28A is also operated by the 318th Special Operations Squadron and the 310th Special Operations Squadron as part of the 27th Special Operations Wing at Cannon Air Force Base, New Mexico. In May 2019 the Air Force officially approved the use of the name 'Draco' for the aircraft.

In August 2022, U.S. Special Operations Command announced it had selected the AT-802U Sky Warden for its Armed Overwatch program. The intent is for them to perform ISR and strike missions in uncontested airspace while operating from austere airfields. The Sky Warden was to take over combat missions from the U-28A, as it is an aging and expensive aircraft that requires specialized equipment and training to maintain; it will, however, continue to provide ISR for operations such as search and rescue and humanitarian relief after the Sky Warden is delivered.

The Finnish Air Force selected the PC-12 NG in 2009 to replace the service's Piper Chieftains and Valmet L-90 Redigos in a liaison role. The aircraft were handed over to the Air Force in 2010. Six PC-12s are in service with the Finnish Air Force.

== Variants ==
PC-12/41
Original production variant certified in Switzerland in 1994, it has a Pratt & Whitney Canada PT6A-67B engine, 4,100 kg (9,039 lb) maximum takeoff weight, conventional round-dial cockpit.
PC-12/45
Certified in 1996, has a Pratt & Whitney Canada PT6A-67B engine, maximum takeoff weight increased to 4,500 kg (9,921 lb). Any of the original production aircraft can be converted to PC-12/45. Sub-variants called Series 1-10, composed of incremental upgrades to the aircraft. Almost all aircraft have been converted to Series 10 specification.
PC-12/47
Certified in 2005, has a Pratt & Whitney Canada PT6A-67B engine, maximum takeoff weight increased to 4,740 kg (10,450 lb). The overhead panel and cockpit switch layout was updated, and some other minor changes such as the wingtips, and cabin heating systems.
PC-12/47E
Variant certified in 2008, has upgraded Honeywell avionics and a Pratt & Whitney Canada PT6A-67P engine. Sometimes known by its trade name PC-12 NG (Next Generation).
PC-12NGX
Announced at the October 2019 NBAA convention, marketing name for a PC-12/47E with a PT6E-67XP engine with FADEC and autothrottle, 290 kn TAS (537 km/h, 334 mph) cruise, 10% larger windows, redesigned interior, extended maintenance, updated Honeywell avionics.
PC-12/47G
Announced March 14, 2025, the PC-12 PRO features a Garmin GFID 3 (powered by the Garmin G3000 Prime), PC-24 style yokes, amongst additional new features including Garmin AutoLand.
PC-12M Spectre
Paramilitary special missions platform marketed in the United States, originally called "Eagle".
U-28A Draco
United States Air Force designation for PC-12 modified as special operations surveillance planes.

== Operators ==
As of May 2023, 2,000 PC-12s had been delivered.

== Accidents and incidents ==
The Aviation Safety Network Wikibase reports 136 accidents and incidents between 3 February 1998 and 15 December 2023. This includes 106 fatalities which gives an average of 0.79 fatalities per accident.

Notable accidents include:

- 26 July 2024, a PC-12/47E registered N357HE crashed near Gillette, Wyoming, United States; all seven aboard were killed.
- 3 October 2021, a PC-12/47E (registration YR-PDV) crashed shortly after take-off from Milan-Linate Airport, Italy; all eight onboard died when the aircraft impacted a building.
- 30 November 2019, a PC-12/47E (N56KJ) crashed after takeoff near Chamberlain, South Dakota, United States abord a private flight. 9 out of the 12 people on board died and the remaining 3 suffered serious injuries.
- 22 March 2009, a PC-12/45 (N128CM) crashed near Butte, Montana, United States during a visual circling approach for landing, resulting in 14 fatalities, including children.

== Specifications (PC-12NG) ==
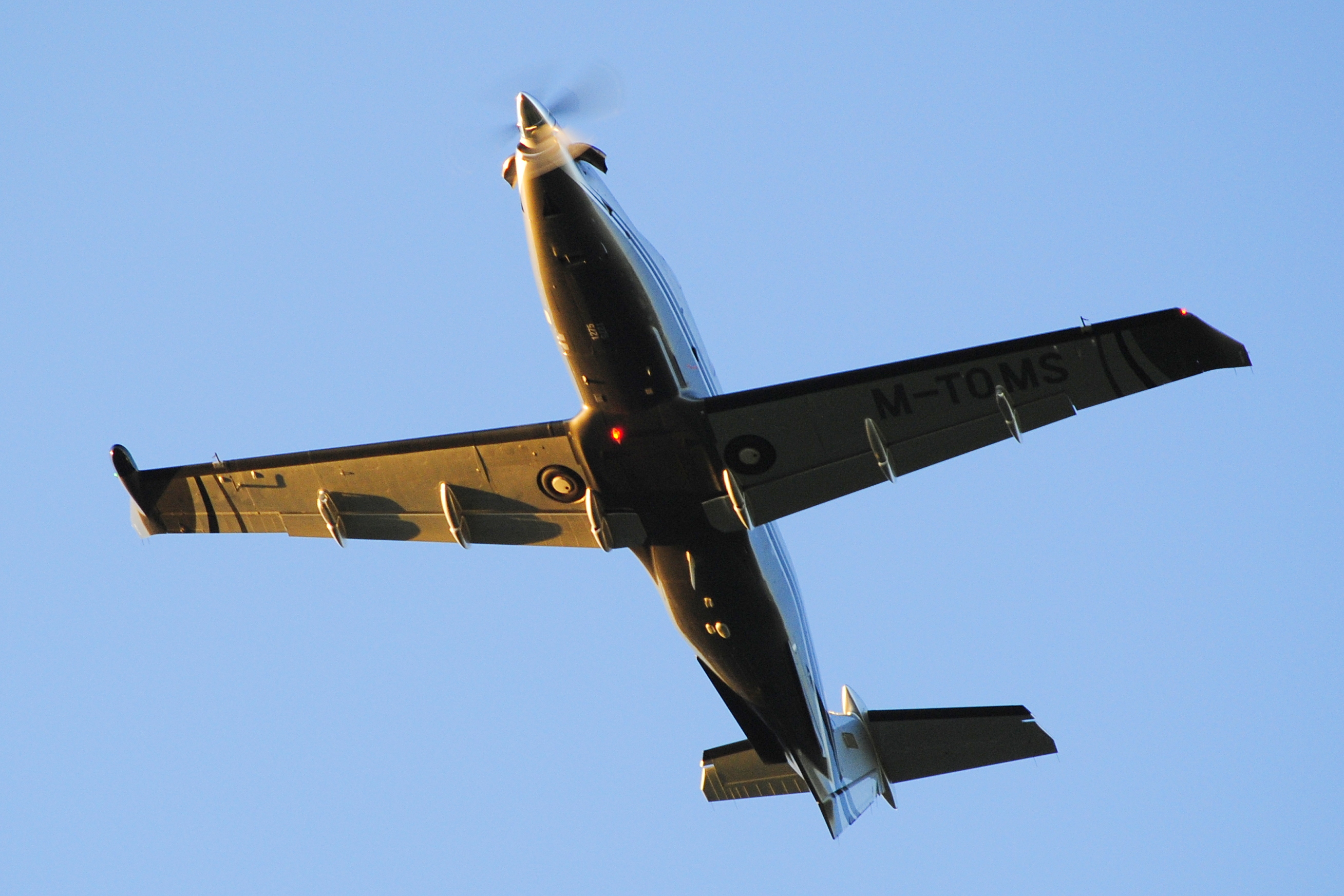
View from below, gear and flaps up

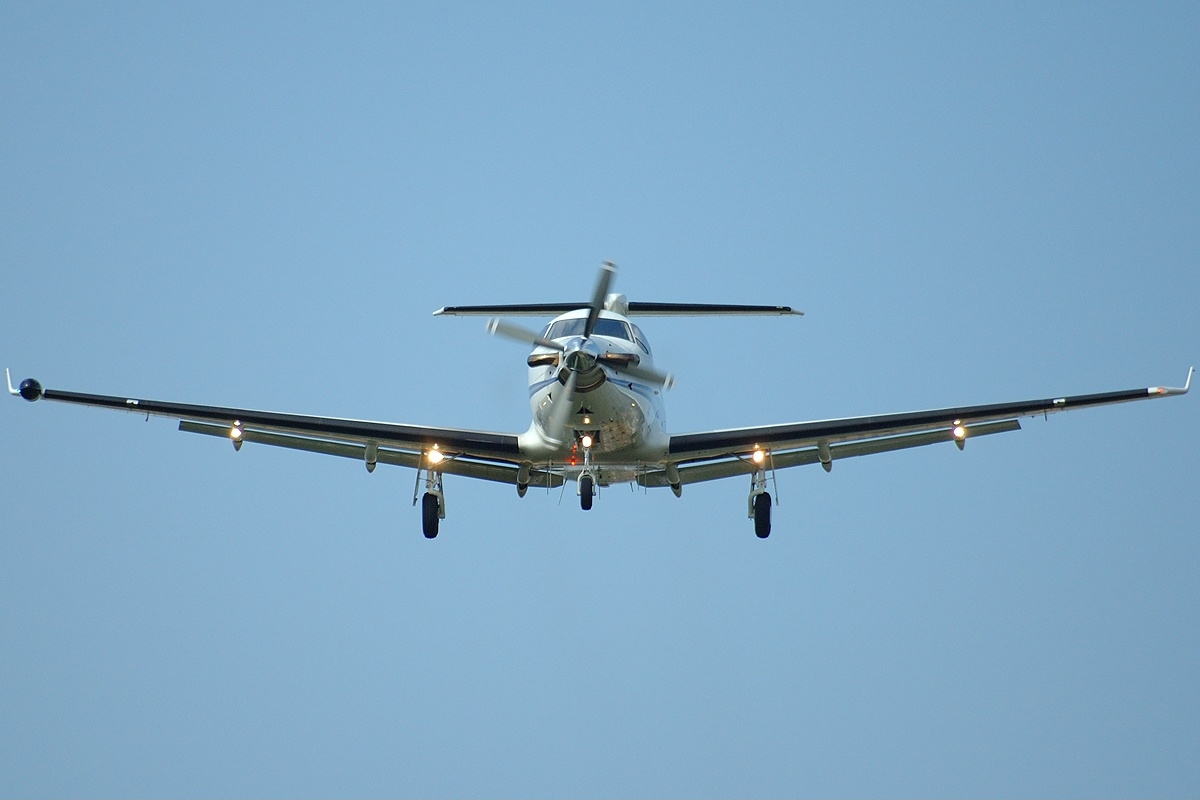
Front view, flaps and gear down

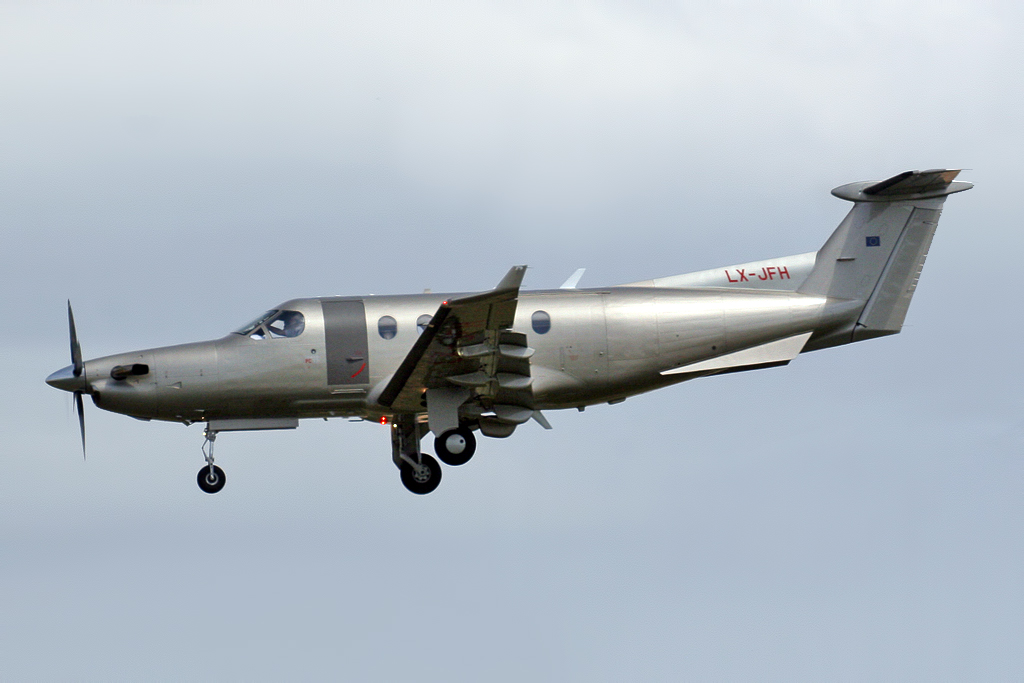
Side view, flaps and gear down

Data from Pilatus

General characteristics

- Crew: 1 or 2
- Capacity: 6 to 9 passengers seats
- Length: 14.4 m (47 ft 3 in)
- Wingspan: 16.28 m (53 ft 5 in)
- Height: 4.26 m (14 ft 0 in)
- Wing area: 25.81 m^{2} (277.8 sq ft)
- Airfoil: root: NASA LS(1)-0417MOD; tip: NASA LS(1)-0313
- Empty weight: 2,810 kg (6,195 lb)
- Max takeoff weight: 4,740 kg (10,450 lb)
- Maximum landing weight: 4,500 kg (9,921 lb)
- Maximum zero fuel weight: 4,100 kg (9,039 lb)
- Fuel capacity: 1,226 kg (2,703 lb) / 1,521 L (402 US gal; 335 imp gal)
- Cabin: 5.16 metres (16.9 ft) long, 1.47 metres (4.8 ft) high, up to 1.52 metres (5.0 ft) wide
- Powerplant: 1 × Pratt & Whitney Canada PT6A-67P turboprop engine, 890 kW (1,200 shp)
- Propellers: 4-bladed Hartzell Propeller composite, 2.67 m (8 ft 9 in) diameter composite constant-speed fully-feathering reversible propeller

Performance

- Cruise speed: 528 km/h (328 mph, 285 kn)
- Stall speed: 124 km/h (77 mph, 67 kn)
- Range: 3,417 km (2,123 mi, 1,845 nmi) (HSC, VFR Reserves)
- Service ceiling: 9,144 m (30,000 ft)
- Rate of climb: 9.75 m/s (1,919 ft/min)
- Take-off distance over 50 ft (15 m): 793 m (2,602 ft)
- Landing distance over 50 ft (15 m): 661 m (2,169 ft)
- Fuel consumption: 250 L/h (66 gal/h; 55 imp gal/h) (915 km (569 mi; 494 nmi) trip, including climb, cruise and descent, 491 km/h (305 mph; 265 kn) average block speed)

Avionics

- Honeywell Primus Apex

== See also ==
Aircraft of comparable role, configuration, and era

- Aero Ae 270 Spirit
- Beechcraft Denali
- Epic E1000
- Myasishchev M-101T
- Piper Meridian
- SOCATA TBM
