= Hickory Level, Georgia =

Unincorporated community in Georgia, U.S.

Coordinates: 33°40′43″N 85°00′05″W

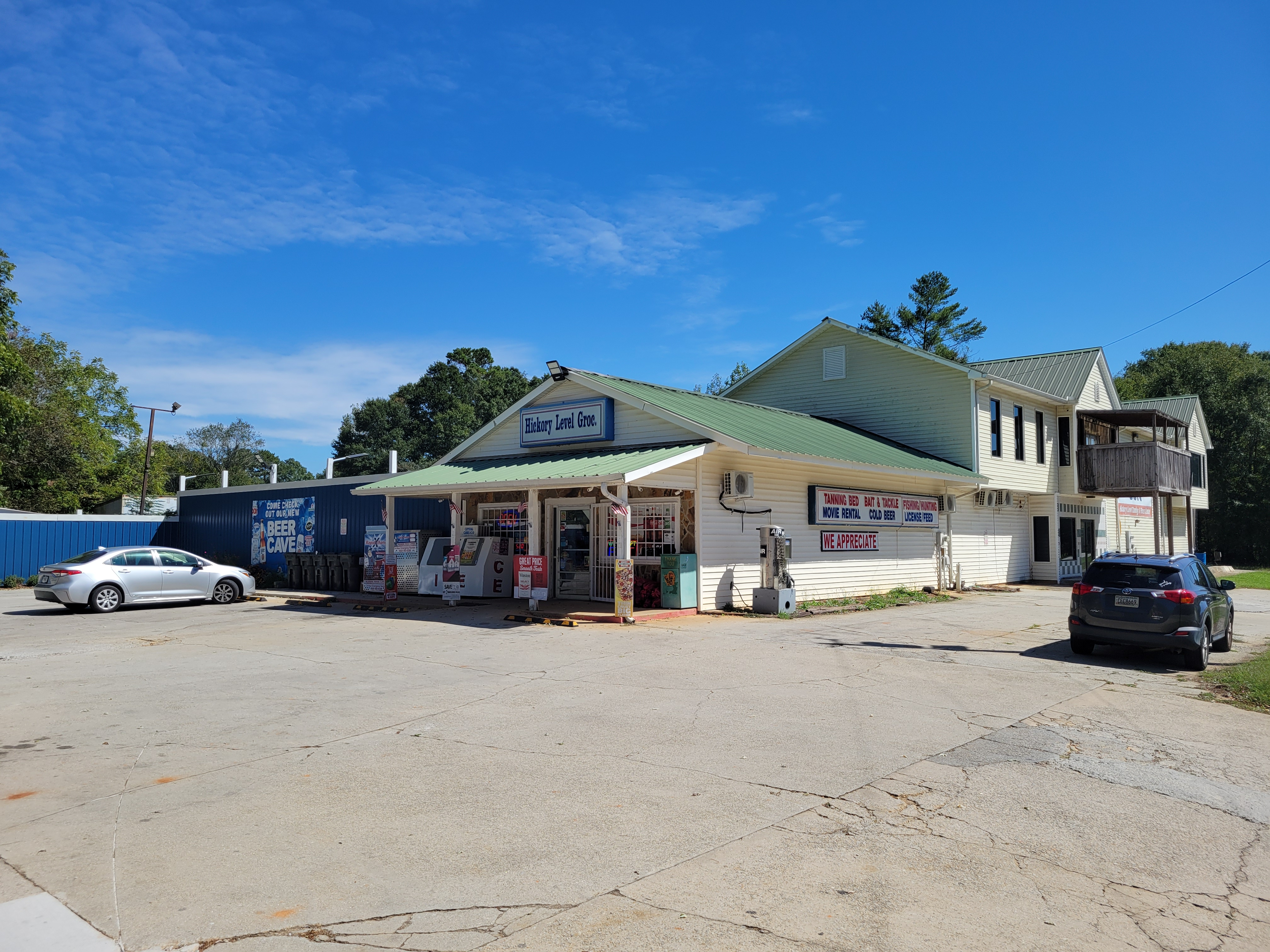
Hickory Level Grocery

Hickory Level is an unincorporated community in Carroll County, in the U.S. state of Georgia.

== History ==
The first permanent settlement at Hickory Level was made in 1828. A post office called Hickory Level was established in 1837, and remained in operation until 1901. The community was named for its hickory groves on the relatively level town site.
