= Roopville, Georgia =

- Town
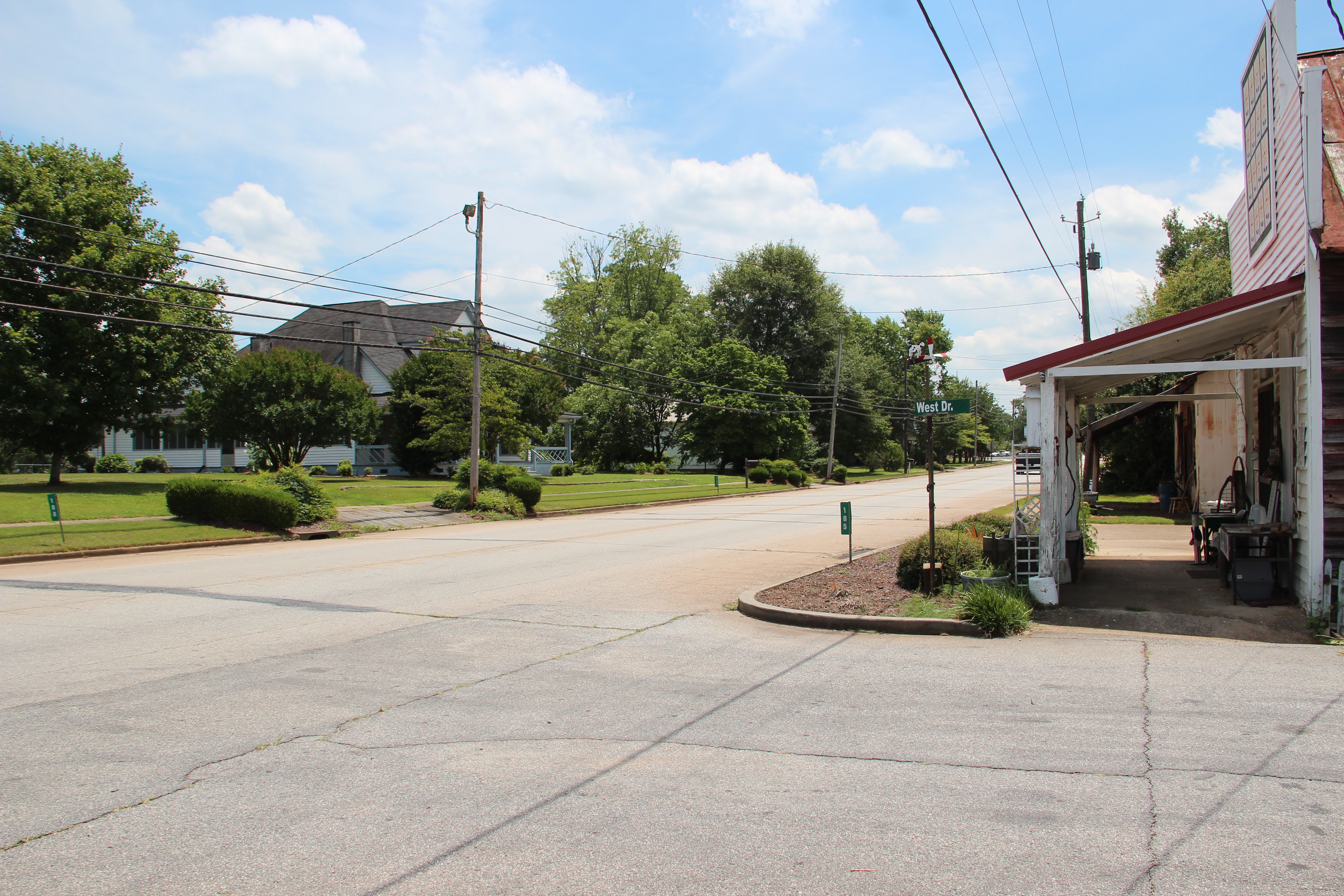
- Downtown Roopville

- Location in Carroll County and the state of Georgia
- Coordinates: 33°27′24″N 85°7′52″W
- Country: United States
- State: Georgia
- County: Carroll

Area
  - Total: 0.79 sq mi (2.05 km^{2})
  - Land: 0.79 sq mi (2.05 km^{2})
  - Water: 0 sq mi (0.00 km^{2})
- Elevation: 1,250 ft (380 m)

Population (2020)
  - Total: 231
  - Density: 292.5/sq mi (112.95/km^{2})
- Time zone: UTC-5 (Eastern (EST))
  - Summer (DST): UTC-4 (EDT)
- ZIP code: 30170
- Area code: 770
- FIPS code: 13-66696
- GNIS feature ID: 0321890
- Website: https://roopvillega.com/

Roopville is a town in Carroll County, Georgia, United States. The population was 231 in 2020, up from 218 at the 2010 census.

== History ==
Roopville was founded in 1881 by John K. Roop, and named for him. The Georgia General Assembly incorporated Roopville as a town in 1885.

== Geography ==
Roopville is located in southern Carroll County at 33°27′24″N 85°7′52″W (33.456731, -85.131219), along U.S. Route 27, which leads 10 miles (16 km) north to Carrollton, the county seat, and south 6 miles (10 km) to Centralhatchee.

According to the United States Census Bureau, the town has a total area of 0.77 square miles (2.0 km^{2}), all land.

== Demographics ==
Historical population
Census	Pop.	Note	%±
1890	123		—
1900	109		−11.4%
1910	173		58.7%
1920	200		15.6%
1930	260		30.0%
1940	230		−11.5%
1950	202		−12.2%
1960	203		0.5%
1970	221		8.9%
1980	229		3.6%
1990	248		8.3%
2000	177		−28.6%
2010	218		23.2%
2020	231		6.0%
U.S. Decennial Census

As of the census of 2000, there were 177 people, 75 households, and 57 families residing in the town. By the 2020 census, its population grew to 231.

== Notable person ==
- Keith Jackson (1928–2018), sportscaster

== Notable resident ==
- Donna Fiducia, News / Media Personality
