= Point of Grace discography =

- Studio albums: 10
- Compilation albums: 3
- Singles: 48
- Video albums: 6

The discography of Christian recording group Point of Grace consists of ten studio albums.

== Albums ==
=== Studio albums ===
Title	Details	Peak chart positions		Certifications (sales threshold)
Title	Details	US	US Christ	Certifications (sales threshold)
Point of Grace	Release date: August 23, 1993; Label: Word Records; Formats: CD, cassette	—	5	US: Gold
The Whole Truth	Release date: March 15, 1995; Label: Word/Epic Records; Formats: CD, cassette	132	1	US: Gold
Life Love & Other Mysteries	Release date: September 9, 1996; Label: Word/Epic Records; Formats: CD, cassette	46	1	US: Platinum
Steady On	Release date: August 4, 1998; Label: Word/Epic Records; Formats: CD, cassette	24	1	US: Platinum
Free to Fly	Release date: May 1, 2001; Label: Word/Curb Records; Formats: CD, cassette	20	1	US: Gold
I Choose You	Release date: October 12, 2004; Label: Word/Curb Records; Formats: CD, music download	85	4	
How You Live	Release date: August 28, 2007; Label: Word/Curb Records; Formats: CD, music download	56	4	
No Changin' Us	Release date: March 2, 2010; Label: Word/Curb Records; Formats: CD, music download	60	2	
A Thousand Little Things	Release date: May 1, 2012; Label: Word Entertainment; Formats: CD, music download	186	8	
Directions Home (Songs We Love, Songs You Know)	Release date: April 7, 2015; Label: Word Entertainment; Formats: CD, music download	—	26	
Beautiful Name: Hymns & Worship Songs	Release date: April 3, 2018; Label: LifeWay Worship; Formats: CD	—	—	
Lady Wisdom	Releasing: March 27, 2026; Label: Curb; Formats: CD, digital download, streaming	To be released		
"—" denotes releases that did not chart

=== Christmas albums ===
Title	Details	Peak chart positions			Certifications (sales threshold)
Title	Details	US	US Christ	US Holiday	Certifications (sales threshold)
A Christmas Story	Release date: September 27, 1999; Label: Word/Curb Records; Formats: CD, cassette	35	1	4	US: Gold
Winter Wonderland	Release date: October 4, 2005; Label: Word/Curb Records; Formats: CD, music download	113	7	3	
Tennessee Christmas: A Holiday Collection	Release date: October 7, 2008; Label: Word/Curb Records; Formats: CD, music download	174	13	16	
Home for the Holidays	Release date: October 5, 2010; Label: Word/Curb Records; Formats: CD, music download	—	21	7	
Sing Noël	Release date: October 10, 2017; Label: LifeWay Worship; Formats: CD, music download	—	—	—	
"—" denotes releases that did not chart

=== Compilation albums ===
Title	Details	Peak chart positions		Certifications (sales threshold)
Title	Details	US	US Christ	Certifications (sales threshold)
Girls of Grace	Release date: August 20, 2002; Label: Word/Curb Records; Formats: CD, cassette	150	9	
24	Release date: April 8, 2003; Label: Word/Curb Records; Formats: CD, cassette	136	9	US: Gold
Turn Up the Music: The Hits of Point of Grace	Release Date: July 12, 2011; Label: Word/Curb Records; Formats: CD, music download	—	27	—
Recollections	Release Date: 2017; Label: Word Records; Formats: CD, music download	—	—	—

=== Remix albums ===
Title	Details	Peak positions
Title	Details	US Christ
Rarities & Remixes	Release date: May 9, 2000; Label: Word/Curb Records; Formats: CD, cassette	4

=== Video albums ===
Title	Details
Life, Love & Other Mysteries: The Video Story	Release date: 1997; Label: Word Records; Formats: VHS
7	Release date: 2003; Label: Word Records; Formats: DVD
A Point of Grace Christmas	Release date: 2020; Label: Center Street Media; Formats: DVD

== Singles ==
Year	Single	Peak chart positions			Album
Year	Single	US Christ	US Christ Air	US Country	Album
1993	"I'll Be Believing"	1		—	Point of Grace
1994	"One More Broken Heart"	1		—	Point of Grace
1994	"Jesus Will Still Be There"	1		—	Point of Grace
1994	"Faith, Hope & Love"	1		—	Point of Grace
1994	"I Have No Doubt"	1		—	Point of Grace
1994	"No More Pain"	1		—	Point of Grace
1995	"The Great Divide"	1		—	The Whole Truth
1995	"Dying To Reach You"	1		—	The Whole Truth
1995	"Gather At The River"	1		—	The Whole Truth
1995	"God Is With Us"	1		—	The Whole Truth
1995	"Love Like No Other"	1		—	The Whole Truth
1996	"Keep The Candle Burning"	1		—	Life Love & Other Mysteries
1996	"You Are The Answer"	1		—	Life Love & Other Mysteries
1996	"Circle Of Friends"	1		—	Life Love & Other Mysteries
1996	"That's The Way It's Meant To Be"	1		—	Life Love & Other Mysteries
1998	"Steady On"	1		—	Steady On
1998	"Saving Grace"	1		—	Steady On
1998	"When The Wind Blows"	1		—	Steady On
1998	"The Wonder Of It All"	1		—	Steady On
1998	"My God"	1		—	Steady On
1998	"The Song Is Alive"	1		—	Steady On
2001	"Blue Skies"	1		—	Free to Fly
2001	"Praise Forevermore"	1		—	Free to Fly
2001	"He Sends His Love"	1		—	Free to Fly
2001	"You Will Never Walk Alone"	1		—	Free to Fly
2001	"Yes, I Believe"	5		—	Free to Fly
2002	"The Love of Christ"	28		—	Girls of Grace
2003	"Day By Day"	1		—	24
2004	"I Choose You"	8		—	I Choose You
2005	"Who Am I?"	8		—	I Choose You
2005	"Waiting In The Wings"	1		—	I Choose You
2005	"Make It Real"	—		—	I Choose You
2005	"Let There Be Light"	6		—	Winter Wonderland
2005	"It's the Most Wonderful Time of the Year"	16		—	Winter Wonderland
2006	"Santa Medley"	—		—	Winter Wonderland
2006	"Breath of Heaven (Mary's Song)"	20		—	Winter Wonderland
2007	"All the World"	18		—	How You Live
2007	"You Are Good"	8		—	How You Live
2007	"How You Live (Turn Up the Music)"	5		52	How You Live
2007	"Fearless Heart"	—		—	How You Live
2007	"Heal The Wound"	1		—	How You Live
2008	"I Wish"	18		49	How You Live (Deluxe Edition)
2009	"King of the World"	39		—	How You Live (Deluxe Edition)
2010	"Come to Jesus"	5		—	No Changin' Us
2010	"There Is Nothing Greater Than Grace"	5		—	No Changin' Us
2010	"Love and Laundry"	—		—	No Changin' Us
2011	"Hole in the World"	—		—	Turn Up the Music: The Hits of Point of Grace
2012	"A Thousand Little Things"	24		—	A Thousand Little Things
2025	"Comfort and Joy" (with Jason Gray)	34	4	—	Non-album single
2026	"Stand"	—	—	—	Lady Wisdom
2026	"Fire"	—	—	—	Lady Wisdom
"—" denotes releases that did not chart

== Music videos ==
Year	Video
1994	"Jesus Will Still Be There"
1995	"Dying to Reach You"
1995	"Gather at the River"
1996	"Keep the Candle Burning"
1996	"That's the Way It's Meant to Be"
1997	"Circle of Friends" (Live)
1998	"Steady On"
2003	"Begin with Me"
2007	"How You Live (Turn Up The Music)"
2009	"I Wish"
2018	"The Power of Love"
