= Turn Up the Music: The Hits of Point of Grace =

Turn Up The Music: The Hits of Point of Grace

Greatest hits album by Point of Grace
- Released: July 12, 2011
- Recorded: 1993–2011
- Genre: Christian pop, country
- Label: Word Records
- Producer: Shaun Shankel; Robert Sterling; Scott Williamson; Phil Naish; Brown Bannister; David Zaffiro; Mark Hammond; Nathan Chapman; Ben Shive

Point of Grace chronology
Home For The Holidays (2010)	Turn Up The Music: The Hits of Point of Grace (2011)	A Thousand Little Things (2012)

Turn Up The Music: The Hits of Point of Grace is the 16th album and second greatest hits album by Contemporary Christian group Point of Grace. The album reached #27 on Billboard Magazine's top Christian Albums on December 10, 2011.

The album was released on July 12, 2011 and features songs previously featured on 2003's 24 release, as well as songs from the albums I Choose You, How You Live, and No Changin' Us. It also features a cover of the song "Hole in the World" by the Eagles, which was produced by Ben Shive and was also the lead single for the compilation. The album compiles songs that have won major awards; two Platinum Records; five Gold Records and chart-topping hits. It is Point of Grace's first greatest hits compilation to feature member Leigh Cappillino.

== Track listing ==
1. "Day By Day" – 3:32
2. "Circle of Friends" – 4:17
3. "How You Live (Turn Up The Music)" (Acoustic Version) – 4:32
4. "Blue Skies" – 4:22
5. "The Great Divide" – 4:20
6. "I Wish" – 3:34
7. "Come To Jesus" – 3:59
8. "Jesus Will Still Be There" – 4:32
9. "Who Am I" – 3:36
10. "I Choose You" – 4:02
11. "God Is With Us" – 4:02
12. "King of the World" – 4:12
13. "Love and Laundry" – 3:00
14. "There Is Nothing Greater Than Grace" – 4:03
15. "Hole In The World" – 3:28

== Single ==
- "Hole In The World"

== Singers ==
- Shelley Breen
- Leigh Cappillino
- Denise Jones
- Terry Jones
- Heather Payne
