= 24 (album) =

Greatest hits album by Point of Grace
- Released: April 8, 2003
- Recorded: 1993–2001
- Genre: Christian pop
- Length: 1:46:30
- Label: Word Records
- Producer: Shaun Shankel; Robert Sterling; Scott Williamson; Phil Naish; Michael Omartian; Brown Bannister; Nathan Nockels; Tom Laune

Point of Grace chronology
Girls of Grace (2002)	24 (2003)	I Choose You (2004)

Singles from 24
- 1. "Day by Day"

Professional ratings
Review scores
Source	Rating
Allmusic	4.5/5 stars

24 is the first greatest hits album by contemporary Christian music group Point of Grace. It was released in 2003 by Word Records. The album title refers to the group's 24 consecutive #1 hits on the Billboard Contemporary Christian Songs chart.

One new song was recorded for the album: "Day by Day," which was founding member Terry Jones' final recording with the group, prior to her departure in 2004, when she was replaced by Leigh Cappillino.

The album was originally released in a digipak with only the words "Point of Grace" and "24" on the cover. It was later reissued in a standard 2CD jewel case with a photo of the group added to the cover, then again with a photo including Cappillino, though she does not appear on the album.

Two tie-ins to the album were released: a book written by the group, titled Keep the Candle Burning: 24 Reflections on Our Favorite Songs, and a DVD of music videos, titled 7 (a play on the phrase "24/7").

== Track listing ==
Disc 1
No.	Title	Writer(s)	Producer	Length
1.	"Day by Day"	Christa Wells, Tiffany Arbuckle Lee	Shaun Shankel	3:32
2.	"I'll Be Believing"	Becky Thurman, Geoff Thurman	Scott Williamson, Robert Sterling	3:18
3.	"One More Broken Heart"	Dwight Liles, Jeff Slaughter	Williamson, Sterling	4:03
4.	"Jesus Will Still Be There"	John Mandeville, Sterling	Williamson, Sterling	4:30
5.	"Faith, Hope & Love"	Kevin Stokes, Ty Lacy	Williamson, Sterling	4:27
6.	"I Have No Doubt"	Dawn Thomas, Tommy Greer	Williamson, Sterling	4:30
7.	"No More Pain"	Thurman, Thurman, Michael English	Williamson, Sterling	4:42
8.	"The Great Divide"	Grant Cunningham, Matt Huesmann	Sterling	4:18
9.	"Dying to Reach You"	Geoff Thurman, Michael Puryear	Sterling	4:14
10.	"Gather at the River"	Joel Lindsey, Regie Hamm	Sterling	3:27
11.	"God Is with Us"	Sterling	Sterling	4:00
12.	"Love Like No Other"	John Mandeville, Lacy	Sterling	4:14

Disc 2
No.	Title	Writer(s)	Producer	Length
1.	"Keep the Candle Burning"	Gayla Borders, Jeff Borders, Lowell Alexander	Phil Naish	4:34
2.	"You Are the Answer"	Huesmann, Hamm	Naish	4:28
3.	"Circle of Friends"	Douglas McKelvey, Steve Siler	Naish	4:14
4.	"That's the Way It's Meant to Be"	Bruce Sudano, Michael Omartian	Omartian	3:29
5.	"Steady On"	Cunningham, Huesmann	Brown Bannister	4:48
6.	"Saving Grace"	Cunningham, Huesmann	Bannister	4:33
7.	"When the Wind Blows"	Chuck Hargett	Bannister	4:27
8.	"The Wonder of It All"	Brent Bourgeois, Michael W. Smith	Bannister	4:11
9.	"My God"	Carla Sullivan	Bannister	5:03
10.	"The Song Is Alive"	Borders, Borders, Alexander	Bannister	4:25
11.	"Blue Skies"	Cunningham, Huesmann	Bannister	4:31
12.	"He Sends His Love"	Jeremy Bose, Paul Evans	Nathan Nockels	4:40
13.	"Praise Forevermore"	Darlene Zschech	Nockels, Tom Laune	4:37

- Disc 1, track 1: New recording, 2003
- Disc 1, tracks 2–7: From Point of Grace, 1993
- Disc 1, tracks 8–12: From The Whole Truth, 1995
- Disc 2, tracks 1–4: From Life, Love & Other Mysteries, 1996
- Disc 2, tracks 5–10: From Steady On, 1998
- Disc 2, tracks 11–13: From Free to Fly, 2001

== Personnel ==
Point of Grace

- Shelley Breen
- Denise Jones
- Terry Jones
- Heather Payne

Musicians on "Day by Day"

- Shaun Shankel – synthesizers, bass, drum programming
- Kyle Jacobs – electric guitars, acoustic guitars
- Dan Needham – drums

== Production ==
Technical credits on "Day by Day"

- Shaun Shankel – engineer, overdubs, editing
- Bill Whittington – engineer, editing
- F. Reid Shippen – mixing
- Lee Bridges – assistant engineer
- David Streit – assistant engineer

Additional credits

- Ken Love – mastering at MasterMix (Nashville, Tennessee)
- Tammie Harris Cleek – creative director
- Sally Carns – design
- Russ Harrington – photography
- Trish Townsend – stylist
- Sheila Davis – hair, make-up
