= Rarities & Remixes =

Remix album by Point of Grace
- Released: May 9, 2000
- Genre: Christian pop
- Length: 62:55
- Label: Word Records
- Producer: Tony McAnany (compilation); Elisa Elder (exec.); Point of Grace (exec.)

Point of Grace chronology
A Christmas Story (1999)	Rarities & Remixes (2000)	Free to Fly (2001)
- Mixed By: Roy Hendrickson

Professional ratings
Review scores
Source	Rating
Allmusic	3/5 stars

Rarities & Remixes is the sixth album by contemporary Christian music group Point of Grace. It was released in 2000 by Word Records.

The album consists of eight remixes of songs from the group's first two albums, Point of Grace and The Whole Truth; "Forever On and On," taken from a compilation album, Streams; an acoustic performance of "Circle of Friends" from the group's third album, Life, Love & Other Mysteries; and five live performances predating the group's signing to Word Records.

== Track listing ==
No.	Title	Writer(s)	Producer	Length
1.	"Gather at the River (Remix)"	Joel Lindsey, Regie Hamm	Robert Sterling, Tom Salta (remix)	3:19
2.	"God Is with Us (Remix)"	Sterling	Sterling, Roy Hendrickson (remix)	4:02
3.	"The Great Divide (Remix)"	Grant Cunningham, Matt Huesmann	Sterling, Hendrickson (remix)	5:06
4.	"Jesus Will Still Be There (Remix)"	John Mandeville, Sterling	Scott Williamson, Sterling, Hendrickson (remix)	4:30
5.	"No More Pain (Remix)"	Becky Thurman, Geoff Thurman, Michael English	Williamson, Sterling, Hendrickson (remix)	5:42
6.	"Forever On and On"	Gordon Kennedy, Jimmie Lee Sloas	Brent Bourgeois, Loren Balman	5:42
7.	"One More Broken Heart (Remix)"	Dwight Liles, Jeff Slaughter	Williamson, Sterling, Hendrickson (remix)	4:39
8.	"Faith, Hope & Love (Remix)"	Kevin Stokes, Ty Lacy, Tom Salta (arr.)	Williamson, Sterling, Hendrickson (remix)	4:07
9.	"More Than Anything (Remix)"	Jon Mohr, Randall Dennis	Sterling, Hendrickson (remix)	5:37
10.	"Say So (Live)"	Joel Engle	Dave McKerley	3:24
11.	"Nothing But the Blood (Live)"	Robert Lowry	McKerley	0:57
12.	"Fairest Lord Jesus (Live)"	Richard Willis (arr.)	Greg Nelson	4:07
13.	"Washed in the Blood (Live)"	Dawn Thomas Yarbrough	McKerley	2:56
14.	"He's the Best Thing (Live)"	Jessy Dixon	McKerley	3:37
15.	"Circle of Friends (Live and Unplugged)"	Douglas McKelvey, Steve Siler	Bubba Smith, Point of Grace	4:12
