= Home for the Holidays (Point of Grace album) =

Studio album by Point of Grace
- Released: October 5, 2010
- Recorded: 2010
- Studios: Starstruck Studios and Pain In The Art Studios (Nashville, Tennessee)
- Genres: Christian pop, country pop, holiday
- Length: 36:42
- Label: Word
- Producers: Nathan Chapman; Stephanie Chapman

Point of Grace chronology
No Changin' Us (2010)	Home for the Holidays (2010)	Turn Up the Music: The Hits of Point of Grace (2011)

Home for the Holidays is the fifteenth album and fourth Christmas album by Christian group Point of Grace. It was released on October 5, 2010. It is their first fully new Christmas recording since their 2005 holiday release, Winter Wonderland. It is also their first full-length holiday release as a trio. The group once again worked with producer Nathan Chapman as well as his wife, Stephanie Chapman.

== Track listing ==
Album release
No.	Title	Writer(s)	Length
1.	"White Christmas"	Irving Berlin	3:45
2.	"Candy Cane Lane"	Jennifer Zuffinetti	2:45
3.	"Labor of Love"	Andrew Peterson	4:34
4.	"Home for the Holidays / Silver Bells"	Robert Allen, Ray Evans, Jay Livingston, Al Stillman	3:53
5.	"Immanuel"	Chad Cates, Tony Wood, Jonathan Yudkin	3:37
6.	"Little Drummer Boy"	Katherine Davis, Henry Onorati, Harry Simeone	3:39
7.	"Holly Jolly Christmas"	Johnny Marks	3:08
8.	"Joy to the World"	Lowell Mason, Isaac Watts	3:22
9.	"Not So Silent Night"	Scott Krippayne, Jeff Peabody	4:10
10.	"The Giver and the Gift" (featuring Jim Brickman)	Nicolle Galyan, Molly Reed, Jonathan Yudkin	3:49
Total length:			36:42

== Personnel ==
Point of Grace

- Shelley Breen – vocals
- Denise Jones – vocals
- Leigh Cappillino – vocals

Musicians

- Mike Rojas – pianos, synthesizers
- Jim Brickman – acoustic piano on "The Giver and the Gift"
- B. James Lowry – acoustic guitar
- Bryan Sutton – acoustic guitar
- Ilya Toshinsky – acoustic guitar, banjo
- Jerry McPherson – electric guitars
- Mike Johnson – steel guitar
- Andy Leftwich – fiddle, mandolin
- Jimmie Lee Sloas – bass
- Glenn Worf – bass
- John Gardner – drums
- Eric Darken – percussion
- Kirk "Jelly Roll" Johnson – harmonica
- Jonathan Yudkin – strings, string arrangements

Children's Choir

- Caroline Breen
- Darby Mae Cappillino
- Price Jones
- Spence Jones

== Production ==
- Jamie Kiner – A&R direction
- Nathan Chapman – producer
- Stephanie Chapman – producer, arrangements
- Chuck Ainlay – engineer, mixing
- Neal Cappellino – engineer
- Brian David Willis – engineer
- Todd Tidwell – assistant engineer
- Justin Francis – mix assistant
- Stephen Jones – mix assistant
- Hank Williams – mastering at MasterMix (Nashville, Tennessee)
- Jason Jenkins – A&R administration
- Jason Campbell – production coordinator
- Emily Mueller – production assistant
- Katherine Petillo – creative director
- Alexa Ward – design
- Laura Dart – photography
- Debbie Dover – hair stylist
- Amber Lehman – stylist, wardrobe
- Edward St. George – make-up

== Awards ==
The album won a Dove Award for Christmas Album of the Year at the 42nd GMA Dove Awards.
