= Steady On =

Steady On may refer to:

- Steady On (Shawn Colvin album), a 1989 album by Shawn Colvin
- Steady On (Point of Grace album), a 1998 album by Point of Grace
- The Steady On Tour, a nationwide tour headlined by Point of Grace
