= Tennessee Christmas: A Holiday Collection =

Studio album by Point of Grace
- Released: October 7, 2008
- Recorded: 1999, 2005, 2008
- Studio: Dark Horse Recording and Townsend Sound (Franklin, Tennessee)
- Genre: Christian pop, Christmas
- Length: 1:00:00
- Label: Word Records
- Producer: Brown Bannister

Point of Grace chronology
How You Live (2007)	Tennessee Christmas: A Holiday Collection (2008)	No Changin' Us (2010)

Tennessee Christmas: A Holiday Collection is a compilation from Point of Grace's two holiday releases, A Christmas Story, released in 1999 and Winter Wonderland, released in 2005. It is the first holiday release by the group as a trio. In it, they revisited Amy Grant's memorable "Tennessee Christmas." The album was released along with How You Live: Deluxe Edition in October 2008 by Word Records.

== Track listing ==
1. "It's the Most Wonderful Time of the Year" - 2:52 *From Winter Wonderland
2. "Jingle Bells" - 4:18 *From Winter Wonderland
3. "Winter Wonderland" - 3:14 *From Winter Wonderland
4. "Let It Snow, Let It Snow, Let It Snow / Sleigh Ride" - 4:10 *From A Christmas Story
5. "Let There Be Light" featuring John David Webster - 4:42 *From Winter Wonderland
6. "Little Town" - 3:59 *From Winter Wonderland
7. "Santa Claus Is Comin' to Town" - 2:35 *From A Christmas Story
8. "Jingle Bell Rock" - 3:06 *From A Christmas Story
9. "Emmanuel, God With Us / O Come, O Come, Emmanuel" - 4:59 *From A Christmas Story
10. "Angels We Have Heard On High" - 5:54 *From A Christmas Story
11. "For Unto Us" - 4:50 *From Winter Wonderland
12. "O Holy Night!" - 4:55 *From A Christmas Story
13. "Joy to the World" - 0:59 *From A Christmas Story
14. "Breath of Heaven (Mary's Song)" - 5:33 *From Winter Wonderland
15. "Tennessee Christmas" - 4:23 *New Recording

== Personnel ==
=== Credits for "Tennessee Christmas" ===
Point of Grace

- Shelley Breen – vocals
- Leigh Cappillino – vocals
- Denise Jones – vocals

Musicians

- Blair Masters – acoustic piano
- J.T. Corenflos – electric guitar
- Ilya Toshinsky – acoustic guitar
- Paul Franklin – steel guitar
- Matt Pierson – bass
- Dan Needham – drums
- Carl Marsh – arrangements
- Wes Hightower – vocal arrangements

== Production ==
- Tim Marshall – compilation executive producer
- Brown Bannister – producer, additional engineer
- Steve Bishir – recording, mixing
- Traci Sterling Bishir – production manager
- Katherine Petillo – art direction
- Don Bailey – design
- Kristin Barlowe – photography
- Debbie Dover – hair stylist
- Kim Perrett – wardrobe
- Blanton Harrell Cooke & Corzine – management

== See also ==
Point of Grace discography
