= King of the World (Point of Grace song) =

Song by Point of Grace
- Songwriter(s): Cindy Morgan

"King of the World" is a song by Point of Grace written by Cindy Morgan. On August 23, 2009, the group appeared on Fox News Channel's Huckabee, performing "King of the World", the last single from How You Live: Deluxe Edition accompanied by Mike Huckabee on bass guitar. The song won Country/Bluegrass Song of the Year at the Covenant Awards and was nominated for Country Recorded Song of the Year at the 41st GMA Dove Awards. The song is included on Turn Up the Music: The Hits of Point of Grace.
