= Turn Up the Music =

Turn Up the Music may refer to:

- "Turn Up the Music" (Bridgit Mendler song), a 2011 song by Bridgit Mendler
- "Turn Up the Music" (Chris Brown song), a 2012 single by Chris Brown
- Turn Up the Music!, a 1993 compilation album by Sammy Hagar
- "How You Live (Turn Up the Music)", a 2007 single by Point of Grace
- Turn Up the Music: The Hits of Point of Grace, a 2011 greatest hits album by Point of Grace
