= Girls of Grace =

Compilation album by Various Artists
- Released: August 20, 2002
- Studio: The Tracking Room, The Groove Room, The Drive-Thru and Bridgeway Studios (Nashville, Tennessee); Dark Horse Recording and The Berwick Room (Franklin, Tennessee)
- Genre: Christian pop
- Length: 38:47
- Label: Word Records
- Producer: Nathan Nockels

Various Artists chronology
Free to Fly (2001)	Girls of Grace (2002)	24 (2003)

Professional ratings
Review scores
Source	Rating
Allmusic	link

Girls of Grace is a compilation album produced by Contemporary Christian group Point of Grace. It was released in 2002 by Word Records.

The album includes several tracks recorded by other female artists of the Christian music scene, including Rachael Lampa, Jennifer Deibler (of FFH), Jaci Velasquez and Joy Williams, as well as three tracks by Point of Grace themselves. It was produced as a soundtrack for a series of weekend conferences and book releases for young women in 2002.

== Track listing ==
1. "My Heart is Set on You"; performed by Point of Grace (Gayla Borders, Jeff Borders) - 3:17
2. "You Are My All in All"; performed by Nichole Nordeman) (Dennis Jernigan) - 4:13
3. "Breath of God"; performed by Christy Nockels (Gayla Borders, Jeff Borders, Paul Field) - 4:23
4. "Every Move I Make"; performed by Out of Eden (David Ruis) - 4:16
5. "All I'll Ever Need"; performed by Point of Grace (Julie Adkison, Gayla Borders, Jeff Borders) - 4:10
6. "Promise My Prayers"; performed by Rachael Lampa (Lowell Alexander, Gayla Borders, Jeff Borders) - 4:30
7. "In the Calm"; performed by Jennifer Deibler (Scott Krippayne, Tony Wood) - 3:09
8. "The Love of Christ"; performed by Point of Grace (Lowell Alexander, Gayla Borders, Jeff Borders) - 3:20
9. "Trust in the Lord"; performed by Jaci Velasquez and Jill Phillips (Amy Sandstrom-Shoyer) - 3:56
10. "Live to Worship"; performed by Joy Williams (Scott Krippayne, John Lemonis, Tony Wood) - 3:33

== Personnel ==
Vocalists

- Point of Grace (Shelley Breen, Denise Jones, Terry Jones & Heather Payne) – vocals (1, 5, 8)
- Nichole Nordeman – vocals (2)
- Christy Nockels – vocals (3)
- Out of Eden (Andrea Baca, Danielle Kimmey & Lisa Kimmey) – vocals (4)
- Racheal Lampa – vocals (6)
- Jennifer Deibler – vocals (7)
- Jill Phillips – vocals (9)
- Jaci Velasquez – vocals (9)
- Joy Williams – vocals (10)

With:

- Tennessee Choir Academy, Mercy Ministry, friends and family – choir

Musicians

- Tim Lauer – keyboards (1, 3, 6), harmonica (1), bouzouki (2, 5), Hammond B3 organ (4)
- Nathan Nockels – Hammond B3 organ (1), keyboards (4, 7, 8)
- Tim Akers – accordion (2, 9), acoustic piano (7)
- Gary Burnette – guitars (1–6, 8–10)
- Rivers Rutherford – guitars (1–6, 8–10)
- Chris Rodriguez – acoustic guitar (3, 10)
- Mark Hill – bass guitar (1–6, 8–10)
- Ken Lewis – drums (1–6, 8–10), percussion (1–6, 8–10)

== Production ==
- Point of Grace – executive producers
- Linda Bourne Wornell – A&R direction
- Nathan Nockels – producer
- Cheryl H. McTyre – A&R administrator
- Bridgett Evans O'Lannerghty – production manager
- Katherine Petillo – art direction
- Jeff Jones – art direction
- Chuck Nelson – art direction
- Kirsten Howard – design
- Robert Ascroft – photography
- Trish Townsend – wardrobe stylist
- Melanie Shelley – hair
- Sheila Davis – make-up
- Mike Atkins – management

Technical credits

- Hank Williams – mastering at MasterMix (Nashville, Tennessee)
- Tom Laune – tracking, mixing
- John Saylor – tracking assistant
- Stephen Lotz – mix assistant
- Ronnie Brookshire – additional recording
- Dave Dillbeck – additional recording
- Todd Robbins – additional recording
