= I Choose You (album) =

Studio album by Point of Grace
- Released: October 12, 2004
- Recorded: Spring – Summer 2004
- Studio: Sixteenth Avenue Sound (Nashville, Tennessee); Rec Room Studio, The Beanstalk, Sound Kitchen and The Puget Sound (Franklin, Tennessee); The Hanger (Sacramento, California)
- Genre: Christian pop
- Length: 44:20
- Label: Word Records
- Producer: Mark Hammond; David Zaffiro; Wayne Kirkpatrick; Brent Bourgeois

Point of Grace chronology
24 (2003)	I Choose You (2004)	Winter Wonderland (2005)

Professional ratings
Review scores
Source	Rating
Allmusic	link

I Choose You is the tenth album and sixth studio album by Contemporary Christian group Point of Grace. It was released in 2004 by Word Records.

The album is the first to feature new member, Leigh Cappillino, who replaced founding member Terry Jones. It is also the group's first full studio album since their 2001 release, Free to Fly.

The title track was written by former According To John front-man John Waller, who went on to write the song "While I'm Waiting" for the 2008 film Fireproof.

== Track listing ==
Album track
No.	Title	Writer(s)	Length
1.	"I Choose You"	John Waller, Jason Hoard, Scott Johnson	4:00
2.	"Down"	Marshall Hall, Sam Mizell, Matthew West, Brian White	3:44
3.	"Who Am I"	Hall, Mizell	3:35
4.	"Worthless"	Jess Cates, Kevin Paige	4:07
5.	"Justified"	Stephen Leiweke	3:35
6.	"God Is In It"	Scott Krippayne, Mizell	3:43
7.	"Make It Real"	Dana Glover, Dillon O'Brian, Robert Thiele	3:58
8.	"Do It Again"	Krippayne, West	3:12
9.	"Waiting In The Wings"	Tony Wood	4:03
10.	"For All You've Done"	Clint Lagerberg	4:44
11.	"Arrival At the City"	John Buyan	1:43
12.	"This Is Your Land"	Phil Baggaley	3:56
Total length:			44:20

== Singles ==
- "I Choose You" - #12
- "Who Am I" - #17
- "Waiting In The Wings" - #33
- "Make It Real" - #15

== Personnel ==
Point of Grace

- Shelley Breen – vocals
- Heather Payne – vocals
- Denise Jones – vocals
- Leigh Cappillino – vocals

Musicians

- Brent Bourgeois – keyboards, programming
- Wayne Kirkpatrick – keyboards, acoustic guitar
- Jimmy Frazier – programming
- David Zaffiro – programming, acoustic guitar, electric guitar, guitars
- Tom Bukovac – acoustic guitar, electric guitar
- Jerry McPherson – guitars
- Jonathan Yudkin – mandolin, strings
- Pat Malone – bass
- Matt Pierson – bass
- Jimmie Lee Sloas – bass
- Ralph Stover – bass
- Steve Brewster – drums
- Mark Hammond – drums, programming
- Chris McHugh – drums
- Bruce Spencer – drums
- James "J.T." Taylor – tambourine
- Chance Scoggins – vocal arrangements

== Production ==
- Shawn McSpadden – executive producer
- John Mays – A&R direction
- Mark Hammond – producer (1)
- Wayne Kirkpatrick – producer (2, 4, 6, 7)
- David Zaffiro – producer (3, 5, 8–10), mixing
- Brent Bourgeois – producer (11, 12), mixing
- Nathan Dantzler – engineer
- Tony Palacios – engineer
- Ralph Stover – engineer, mixing
- Dave Dillbeck – mixing, editing, Pro Tools
- Kenzi Butler – assistant engineer
- Charles Meserole – guitar engineer
- David Schober – vocal recording
- Dan Shike – mastering at Tone and Volume Mastering (Nashville, Tennessee)
- Betty Ashton Andrews – production assistant
- Susan Zaffiro – production assistant
- Mark Lusk – artist development
- Chuck Hargett – art direction, design
- Katherine Petillo – art direction
- Andrew Southam – photography
- David Kaufman – wardrobe stylist
- Kali – hair stylist
- Tracy Sondern – make-up
- Mike Atkins Entertainment – management
