= No Changin' Us =

Studio album by Point of Grace
- Released: March 2, 2010
- Recorded: 2009
- Genres: Christian pop; country pop
- Length: 39:20
- Label: Word Records
- Producer: Nathan Chapman

Point of Grace chronology
Tennessee Christmas: A Holiday Collection (2008)	No Changin' Us (2010)	Home For The Holidays (2010)

No Changin' Us is the fourteenth album and eighth studio album by Christian group Point of Grace. It was released on March 2, 2010.

== Background ==
It is their first full-length recording since their 2007 release, How You Live. It is also their first full-length release since the June 2008 departure of Heather Payne reduced the group to a trio. The album was produced by Nathan Chapman, who has achieved success due to his work with country singer Taylor Swift. The album features a more country-oriented sound, due to the group's growing acceptance within the country music market.

The album's lead single, "Come to Jesus", was released on February 2, 2010. The track "The Greatest Show On Earth" was written by the group along with Cindy Morgan and Julie Adkison. The track "A Good Place to Turn Around" was originally recorded by country singer Kayla King.

== Awards ==
The album won a Dove Award for Country Album of the Year at the 42nd GMA Dove Awards. The song "There Is Nothing Greater Than Grace" also won for Country Recorded Song of the Year.

== Track listing ==
No.	Title	Writer(s)	Length
1.	"He Holds Everything"	Jimmy Yeary; Nathan Chapman	3:35
2.	"Wildflower"	Gordie Sampson; Hillary Lindsey; Steve McEwan	3:13
3.	"Hometown"	Leslie Satcher	3:12
4.	"There Is Nothing Greater than Grace"	Antonio Neal; Marshall Hall; Sam Mizell	4:02
5.	"No Changin' Us"	Stephanie Chapman	4:16
6.	"Love and Laundry"	Brian Nash; Leah Crutchfield; Mallary Hope	2:59
7.	"What About Jesus"	Luke Sheets; Mike Logan	3:28
8.	"Chalk in the Rain"	Brian White; Stephanie Hall; Steve Dean	3:27
9.	"The Greatest Show on Earth"	Cindy Morgan; Julie Adkison; Denise Jones; Shelley Breen; Leigh Capillino	3:02
10.	"A Good Place to Turn Around"	Jon Mabe; Patrick Jason Matthews; Rebecca Lynn Howard	4:10
11.	"Come to Jesus"	Paul Alan	3:56
Total length:			39:20

Bonus disc
No.	Title	Writer(s)	Length
1.	"All the World"	Jason Ingram; Sam Mizell	4:33
2.	"I Wish"	Cindy Morgan; Phil Madeira	3:34
3.	"How You Live (Turn Up the Music)" (acoustic version)	Cindy Morgan	4:33
4.	"King of the World"	Cindy Morgan	4:12
5.	"You Are Good"	Clint Lagerberg; Nichole Nordeman	4:08
Total length:			21:00

== Personnel ==
Point of Grace

- Shelley Breen – vocals
- Leigh Capillino – vocals
- Denise Jones – vocals

Musicians

- Tony Harrell – keyboards (1–4, 6–11)
- Kenny Greenberg – electric guitar (1, 3–10)
- B. James Lowery – acoustic guitar (1, 3–10)
- Bryan Sutton – acoustic guitar (1, 3, 5, 10), mandolin (3, 8, 10), banjo (8)
- Nathan Chapman – backing vocals (3), acoustic guitar (5, 11), keyboards (5), bass (5), electric guitar (6, 8, 11), percussion (6, 8), mandolin (11), tambourine (11)
- Stephanie Chapman – acoustic guitar (5)
- Mike Johnson – steel guitar (1, 3, 8, 10), dobro (5, 6)
- Dan Dugmore – steel guitar (4, 7, 9), percussion (7)
- Ilya Toshinsky – banjo (6), mandolin (7)
- Glenn Worf – bass (1, 3, 4, 6–10)
- Shannon Forrest – drums (1, 3, 5, 10)
- Nick Buda – drums (4, 6–9, 11)
- Eric Darken – percussion (1, 3, 4, 9, 10)
- Rob Hajacos – fiddle (1, 3–10)
- Chris Carmichael – strings (3, 4, 7, 11)

== Production ==
- A&R – Josh Bailey and Jamie Kiner
- Producer – Nathan Chapman
- Assistant Producer on Tracks 4, 7, 9 & 11 – Emily Mueller
- Recorded by Derek Bason (Tracks 1–3, 5 & 10); Chad Carlson (Tracks 4, 7, 9 & 11); Clark Schleicher (6 & 8).
- Assistant Recording – Todd Tidwell (Tracks 1–3, 5, 6, 8, 10 & 11); Nathan Yarborough (Tracks 4, 7 & 9); Shawn Dougherty (Tracks 6 & 8).
- Additional Recording on Track 5 – Nathan Chapman
- Additional Engineer on Track 5 – Brian David Willis
- Recorded at Starstruck Studios, Pain In The Art Studios, Jane's Place, Blackbird Studios, The Ice Box and I.T. Studios (Nashville, TN); Stonehurst Studios (Bowling Green, KY).
- Mastered by Jim DeMain at Yes Master Studio (Nashville, Tennessee).
- A&R Coordinator – Kirsten Wines
- Creative Director – Katherine Petillo
- Art Direction and Design – Don Bailey
- Photography – Kristin Barlowe
- Stylist – Amber Lehman
- Hair Stylist – Debbie Dover
- Make-up – Sheila Davis Curti

== Chart performance ==
Chart (2010)	Peak position
U.S. Billboard 200	60
U.S. Billboard Top Christian Albums	2

=== Singles ===
- "Come To Jesus" #7
- "There Is Nothing Greater Than Grace" #12
- "Love And Laundry" #15
