= Satellites & Sirens =

- Origin: Nashville, Tennessee
- Genres: Christian Rock, electronica
- Years active: 2006–present
- Label: Word Records
- Members: Geoff Hunker; Jonathan Dimmel; David Troyer; David Willey

Satellites & Sirens is a synth and guitar driven Christian rock band from Nashville, Tennessee. Members include Geoff Hunker, lead singer and founder of the band, as well as Jonathan Dimmel (drums), David Troyer (guitar), and David Willey (bass/synth). The band formed in 2006 on Craigslist. While still in its infancy, it gained attention. MTV featured the band as its "Needle in the Haystack" spotlight artist for the week of Monday, June 21, 2010. Furthermore, the single Anchor climbed several charts including the Weekend 22, which airs on stations nationwide. Their self-titled album debuted March 2010 with Word Records.

== History and Formation ==
In 2006, after Hunker moved to Nashville and began working with producer Rusty Varenkamp on what would become Satellites & Sirens, Hunker decided it was time to assemble a band. "I just put up an ad [on Craigslist] looking for guitar, bass, and drums to just see what happened," he says. "Probably 80 percent of the stuff that came out of it was just absolutely horrible." However, from the ad Hunker managed to find drummer Jonathan Dimmel, who impressed Hunker both musically and personally. Shortly after, Dimmel introduced both Willey and Troyer to Hunker and into S&S. The band was then promoted through online advertising and social networks. Despite their origins, the band members also consider themselves close friends as opposed to just co-workers. Josue S. Lopez, Ex-Representative, and Co-manager of the band overheard Dimmel remark, "A lot of bands don't have that. Especially when they don't go back further than, you know, two years off Craigslist."

== Discography ==
=== Albums ===
Album	Release date
Satellites & Sirens	March 2, 2010
Frequency	October 11, 2011
The Covers	August 21, 2012
One Noise	March 18, 2014
TANKS	October 14, 2016

=== EPs ===
EP	Release date
All We Need is Sound	August 4, 2009
Breaking the Noise	October 6, 2009
Anchor	May 11, 2010

== Music videos ==
- "Breaking the Noise" from their 2010 self-titled album 'Satellites & Sirens'
- "Take Me Back" from their 2010 self-titled album 'Satellites & Sirens'
- "Let It Go" from their 2011 album 'Frequency'

== Awards ==
=== GMA Dove Awards ===
Year	Award	Result
2011	Rock Recorded Song of the Year (Anchor)	Nominated
2011	Rock/Contemporary Album of the Year (Satellites & Sirens)	Nominated
