= 42nd GMA Dove Awards =

2011 US music awards ceremony

- Date: April 20, 2011
- Location: Fox Theatre, Atlanta, Georgia
- Hosted by: Sherri Shepherd

Television/radio coverage
- Network: GMC (April 24, 2011)

The 42nd Annual GMA Dove Awards presentation was held on April 20, 2011, at the Fox Theatre in Atlanta, Georgia. The show was broadcast on GMC on April 24, 2011, hosted by Sherri Shepherd from The Newlywed Game.

Nominations were announced on February 15, 2011. The awards recognized the accomplishments of Christian musicians for the year 2010.

== Performers ==
Telecast ceremony

The following performed:

Artist(s)	Song(s)
Chris Tomlin	"Our God"
Francesca Battistelli; Britt Nicole; Janet Paschal; Kerrie Roberts; Laura Story; Audrey Assad; Natalie Grant; Sandi Patty	Tribute to Sandi Patty "Via Dolorosa" "We Shall Behold Him" "In the Name of the Lord" "Love in Any Language"
Point of Grace; Kenny Rogers	"Standing On the Rock of Your Love"
Steven Curtis Chapman; Mark Hall; Third Day	"Children of God"
Tenth Avenue North	"You Are More"
Mary Mary	"Wave My Flag"
Jason Crabb	"Sometimes I Cry"
Francesca Battistelli	"This Is the Stuff"
Kirk Franklin	"Smile"

== Presenters ==
The following presented:

- Francesca Battistelli
- Sandi Patty – Female Vocalist of the Year
- Chonda Pierce
- Marvin Sapp
- Committed
- Ernie Haase and Signature Sound
- Lecrae
- Audrey Assad
- Deitrick Haddon
- Smokie Norful
- Tim Tebow
- Greg Jennings
- Ruben Studdard
- Kim Fields

== Awards ==
=== General ===
Artist of the Year

- Francesca Battistelli
- Jason Crabb
- Ernie Haase & Signature Sound
- Natalie Grant
- Marvin Sapp
- TobyMac
- Chris Tomlin

New Artist of the Year

- Audrey Assad
- Chris August
- Forever Jones
- John Mark McMillan
- No Other Name
- Kerrie Roberts
- Kristian Stanfill

Group of the Year

- Ernie Haase & Signature Sound
- Gaither Vocal Band
- MercyMe
- Mikeschair
- Needtobreathe
- Sidewalk Prophets
- Tenth Avenue North

Male Vocalist of the Year

- Doug Anderson
- Chris August
- Jason Crabb
- Brandon Heath
- Israel Houghton
- Marvin Sapp
- Chris Tomlin

Female Vocalist of the Year

- Audrey Assad
- Francesca Battistelli
- Natalie Grant
- Britt Nicole
- Janet Paschal
- Kerrie Roberts
- Laura Story

Song of the Year

- "All of Creation" – MercyMe
  - Bart Millard, Robby Shaffer, Jim Bryson, Mike Scheuchzer, Barry Graul, songwriters
- "Beautiful, Beautiful" – Francesca Battistelli
  - Francesca Battistelli, Ian Eskelin, Andrew Fromm, songwriters
- "Get Back Up" – TobyMac
  - Toby McKeehan, Cary Barlowe, Jamie Moore, Aaron Rice, songwriters
- "Hold My Heart" – Tenth Avenue North
  - Mike Donehey, Jason Ingram, Phillip LaRue, songwriters
- "Lead Me" – Sanctus Real
  - Matt Hammitt, Jason Ingram, Chris Rohman, songwriters
- "Let the Waters Rise" – Mikeschair
  - Sam Tinnesz, Mike Grayson, Ben Glover, songwriters
- "Love Came Calling" – Triumphant Quartet
  - Wayne Haun, Joel Lindsey, songwriters
- "Our God" – Chris Tomlin
  - Jonas Myrin, Matt Redman, Jesse Reeves, Chris Tomlin, songwriters
- "Sometimes I Cry" – Jason Crabb
  - Gerald Crabb, songwriter
- "Starry Night" – Chris August
  - Chris August, Ed Cash, songwriters

Songwriter of the Year

- Gerald Crabb

Producer of the Year

- Ed Cash
- Ian Eskelin
- Wayne Haun
- Bernie Herms
- Jason Ingram and Rusty Varenkamp

=== Pop ===
Pop/Contemporary Recorded Song of the Year

- "All of Creation" – MercyMe
- "Beautiful, Beautiful" – Francesca Battistelli
- "Get Back Up" – TobyMac
- "Keep Changing the World" – Mikeschair
- "Lead Me" – Sanctus Real
- "Starry Night" – Chris August

Pop/Contemporary Album of the Year

- Jars of Clay Presents: The Shelter – Jars of Clay
- Love Revolution – Natalie Grant
- No Far Away – Chris August
- The Light Meets the Dark – Tenth Avenue North
- Until the Whole World Hears – Casting Crowns

=== Rock ===
Rock Recorded Song of the Year

- "Anchor" – Satellites and Sirens
- "Dear X (You Don’t Own Me)" – Disciple
- "Showstopper" – TobyMac
- "Start Again" – Red
- "The Sound (John M. Perkins' Blues)" – Switchfoot

Rock/Contemporary Recorded Song of the Year

- "Beautiful Things" – Gungor
- "Lift Up Your Face" – Third Day
- "Something Beautiful" – Needtobreathe
- "Straight to Your Heart" – Mikeschair
- "Tonight" – TobyMac

Rock Album of the Year

- Horseshoes & Handgrenades – Disciple
- Live – DecembeRadio
- Memento Mori – Flyleaf
- The World Is a Thorn – Demon Hunter
- Travel III – Future of Forestry

Rock/Contemporary Album of the Year

- Move – Third Day
- Pieces of a Real Heart – Sanctus Real
- Satellites & Sirens – Satellites & Sirens
- The Medicine – John Mark McMillan
- The Rising – Charlie Hall
- Tonight – TobyMac

=== Rap/Hip-Hop ===
Rap/Hip-Hop Recorded Song of the Year

- "Background" – Lecrae
- "Calling You" – KJ-52
- "No Be Nah" – John Reuben
- "Too Many Fakes" – JayEss
- "Walking On the Stars" – Group 1 Crew

Rap/Hip–Hop Album of the Year

- Between Two Worlds – Trip Lee
- Outta Space Love – Group 1 Crew
- Rapture Ruckus – Rapture Ruckus
- Rehab – Lecrae
- Sex, Drugs and Self-Control – John Reuben

=== Inspirational ===
Inspirational Recorded Song of the Year

- "Christ Is Risen" – Matt Maher
- "Great Are You Lord" – Phillips, Craig & Dean
- "I Feel a Song Coming On" – Ryan Seaton
- "Joseph" – Jason Crabb
- "You Deliver Me" – Selah
- "polly put kettle on" - Jonny Dent

Inspirational Album of the Year

- A capella – Brian Free & Assurance
- Acoustic Sunday – Kevin Williams
- Downtown Church – Patty Griffin
- The Edge of the Divine – Sandi Patty
- The Stage Is Bare – Ryan Seaton

=== Gospel ===
Southern Gospel Recorded Song of the Year

- "Better Day" – Gaither Vocal Band
- "Faithful One" – The Booth Brothers
- "I Thirst" – Ernie Haase & Signature Sound
- "Live With Jesus" – The Oak Ridge Boys
- "Love Came Calling" – Triumphant Quartet

Southern Gospel Album of the Year

- A Tribute to the Cathedral Quartet – Ernie Haase & Signature Sound
- Greatly Blessed – Gaither Vocal Band
- Never Walk Alone – Brian Free & Assurance
- Shine – Bowling Family
- Something's Happening – The Hoppers

Traditional Gospel Recorded Song of the Year

- "Go Tell It on the Mountain" – Jason Crabb
- "Jesus Has Been This Way Before" – Beverly Moore
- "TheFavor" – Shirley Caesar
- " Greatest Name" – Victory Cathedral Choir
- "The Master Plan" – Tamela Mann

Traditional Gospel Album of the Year

- A City Called Heaven – Shirley Caesar
- At the Revival – Mighty Clouds Of Joy
- Smokie Norful Presents – Victory Cathedral Choir
- The Master Plan – Tamela Mann
- Waymaker – The Original Messengers

Contemporary Gospel Recorded Song of the Year

- "He Wants It All" – Forever Jones
- "I Choose to Worship" – Wess Morgan
- "Nobody Greater" – VaShawn Mitchell
- "The Best In Me" – Marvin Sapp
- "You Hold My World" – Israel Houghton

Contemporary Gospel Album of the Year

- Get Ready – Forever Jones
- Gospel According to Jazz 3 – Kirk Whalum
- Here I Am – Marvin Sapp
- Love God, Love People – Israel Houghton
- Triumphant – VaShawn Mitchell

=== Country & Bluegrass ===
Country Recorded Song of the Year

- "Are You the One" – Guy Penrod
- "God's Gonna Ease My Troublin’ Mind" – The Oak Ridge Boys
- "Living In the Arms Of Mercy" – The Hoppers
- "Run and Tell" – Bowling Family
- "There Is Nothing Greater Than Grace" – Point of Grace

Country Album of the Year

- Breathe Deep – Guy Penrod
- Expecting Good Things – Jeff & Sheri Easter
- Mosaic – Ricky Skaggs
- No Changin' Us – Point of Grace
- Times Like These – Austins Bridge
- Turn Up the Music – Crawford Crossing

Bluegrass Recorded Song of the Year

- "Blaze of Glory" – Chigger Hill Boys & Terri
- "I’m Going to Make Heaven My Home" – Lewis Tradition
- "I’m Using My Bible for a Roadmap" – George Hamilton IV with Del McCoury & The Moody Brothers
- "Mountaintop" – Lizzy Long & Little Roy Lewis
- "Standing" – Cherryholmes
- "Workin’ on a Road" – Jeff & Sheri Easter

Bluegrass Album of the Year

- ...Oh Well – Chigger Hill Boys & Terri
- Just a Little Closer Home – Paul Williams & The Victory Trio
- Light On My Feet, Ready To Fly – Doyle Lawson & Quicksilver
- Look to the Light: Songs of Faith from the Pen of Rick Lang – Various Artists
- Singing From the Heart – Dailey & Vincent
- Sounds Like Heaven to Me – Lou Reid & Carolina

=== Praise & Worship ===
Worship Song of the Year

- "Christ Is Risen" – Matt Maher
  - Matt Maher, Mia Fieldes, songwriters
- "The Greatness of Our God" – Hillsong Live
  - Reuben Morgan, Jason Ingram, Stuart Garrard, songwriters
- "How Great Is the Love" – Meredith Andrews
  - Meredith Andrews, Jacob Sooter, Paul Baloche, songwriters
- "How He Loves" – John Mark McMillan
  - John Mark McMillan, songwriter
- "Our God" – Chris Tomlin
  - Jonas Myrin, Matt Redman, Jesse Reeves, Chris Tomlin, songwriters

Praise & Worship Album of the Year

- A Beautiful Exchange – Hillsong Live
- As Long As It Takes – Meredith Andrews
- Everywhere – Geron Davis
- Jars of Clay Presents: The Shelter – Jars of Clay
- Passion: Awakening – Chris Tomlin, Kristian Stanfill, David Crowder Band, Christy Nockels, Charlie Hall, Matt Redman, Fee, Hillsong United
- We Cry Out: The Worship Project – Jeremy Camp

=== Others ===
Urban Recorded Song of the Year

- "All I Need" – Brian Courtney Wilson
- "Finally" – Lowell Pye
- "He Knows" – Karen Clark Sheard
- "Life" – Beckah Shae
- "Wait On the Lord" – Lola Godheld

Spanish Language Album of the Year

- Altisima Adoracion – V Music
- Con Todo – Hillsong
- Cuan Gran Amor – En Vivo Miami – Ingrid Rosario
- Devoción – Danilo Montero
- Mi Declaracion – Hector Sotelo

Special Event Album of the Year

- One Voice – Every Tribe, Tongue & Nation (Survivor Records/EMI Gospel)
- Passion: Awakening (Sparrow Records/Sixsteps Records)
- Rock of Ages (BEC Recordings)
- Sweetpea's Songs for Girls (Big Idea)
- The British Are Coming (Zoë Records)

Christmas Album of the Year

- Another Sentimental Christmas – Russ Taff
- Christmas Like This – Ayiesha Woods
- Home for the Holidays – Point of Grace
- The Essential Christmas Collection – Various artists
- The Isaacs Christmas – The Isaacs

Choral Collection of the Year

- All I Need – Geron Davis and Bradley Knight
- Big Mighty God – Lari Goss and Russell Mauldin
- Declare Your Name – Carol Cymbala (orchestrated by Chris MacDonald)
- National Quartet Convention Collection – Marty Hamby
- Rise and Sign (featuring the Prestonwood Student C) – Bradley Knight

Recorded Music Packaging of the Year

- Fireflies and Songs – Sara Groves
  - Wayne Brezinka (art director, graphic artist), Jaime Rau (illustrator/photographer); INO Records
- Hello Hurricane (Deluxe Edition) – Switchfoot
  - Rob Gold (art director), Andy Barron (graphic artist, illustrator/photographer); Lowercase people records/Atlantic Records
- Move – Third Day
  - Beth Lee (art director), Tim Parker (graphic artist, illustrator/photographer); Essential Records
- Suburba – House of Heroes
  - Brad Moist (art director), Eddy Boer (graphic artist), Andrew Beckman (illustrator/photographer); Gotee Records
- The World Is a Thorn (Deluxe Edition) – Demon Hunter
  - Ryan Clark (art director), Dan Seagrave (graphic artist), Jerad Knudson (illustrator/photographer); Solid State Records
- We Cry Out: The Worship Project (Deluxe Edition) – Jeremy Camp
  - Jordan Butcher (art director, graphic artist), Laura Dart (illustrator/photographer); BEC Recordings

=== Musicals ===
Musical of the Year

- "What's Up, Zak?" A Musical Encounter with Jesus
- As Sure As My Redeemer Lives... So Shall I
- God Coming Down
- Just Run
- The Star Still Shines

=== Videos ===
Short Form Music Video of the Year

- "Better Than a Hallelujah" – Amy Grant
  - Kip Kubin (video director and producer)
- "For Those Who Wait" – Fireflight
  - Andy & Jon Erwin (video directors), Dan Atchison (video producer)
- "Invasion (Hero)" – Trip Lee
  - Amisho Baraka Lewis (video director), TK McKamy (video producer)
- "My Own Little World" – Matthew West
  - Eric Welch (video director and producer)
- "SMS (Shine)" – David Crowder Band
  - David Crowder Band (video directors and producers)

Long Form Music Video of the Year

- A Beautiful Exchange – Hillsong Live
  - Joel Houston (video director), Joel Houston, Andrew Crawford, Reuben Morgan (video producers)
- A Tribute to the Cathedral Quartet – Ernie Haase & Signature Sound
  - Doug Stuckey (video director), Bill Gaither, Ernie Haase (video producers)
- An Inconvenient Christmas – The Oak Ridge Boys
  - Jim Halsey (video director), Warren G. Stitt, David Forman, Duane Allen (video producers)
- Count Your Blessings – Bill and Gloria Gaither and Homecoming Friends
  - Doug Stuckey (video director), Bill Gaither, Barry Jennings, Bill Carter (video producers)
- Until the Whole World Hears... Live – Casting Crowns
  - Andy & Jon Erwin (video directors), Dan Atchison (video producer)

== Artists with multiple nominations and awards ==
The following artists received multiple nominations:

- Six: TobyMac
- Five: Ernie Haase & Signature Sound
- Four: Francesca Battistelli, Jason Crabb, Marvin Sapp, Chris Tomlin
- Three: Natalie Grant

The following artists received multiple awards:

- Three: Francesca Battistelli, Chris August, Jason Crabb, Point of Grace
- Two: Needtobreathe, Group 1 Crew, Gaither Vocal Band, Meredith Andrews
