= Expecting Good Things =

Studio album by Jeff & Sheri Easter
- Released: January 26, 2010
- Genre: Contemporary Christian music, Southern Gospel
- Producer: Spring Hill Music Group

Jeff & Sheri Easter chronology
We Are Family (2009)	Expecting Good Things (2010)	Live at Oak Tree (2010)

Expecting Good Things is an album from Christian duo Jeff & Sheri Easter. It was released on January 26, 2010.

== Track listing ==
1. "The Sun Will Shine Again" - 2:57
2. "Born To Climb" - 3:44
3. "Time For Me To Fly" - 3:26
4. "Love Remains" - 3:55
5. "Workin' On A Road" - 3:16
6. "I Know I Love You" - 3:26
7. "Expecting Good Things" - 3:00
8. "Over The Mountain" - 3:19
9. "I Get To" - 3:24
10. "I Need You More Today" - 2:52
11. "I Don't Wanna Cry" - 3:25
12. "In The Name Of Jesus" - 3:12
13. "Hear My Heart" - 4:02

== Awards ==
In 2010, the song "Born to Climb" was nominated to two Dove Awards (Song of the Year and Southern Gospel Recorded Song of the Year) at the 41st GMA Dove Awards where it ended up winning the latter. The following year, the album was also nominated for a GMA Dove Award for Country Album of the Year at the 42nd GMA Dove Awards.

Expecting Good Things was also nominated for a Grammy Award for Best Southern, Country, Or Bluegrass Gospel Album at the 53rd Grammy Awards.

== Chart performance ==
The album peaked at #33 on Billboard's Christian Albums and #22 on Heatseekers Albums.
