= A Thousand Little Things =

Studio album by Point of Grace
- Released: May 1, 2012
- Recorded: 2011
- Studio: The Holiday Ian (Franklin, Tennessee)
- Genre: Christian pop, country pop
- Length: 34:48
- Label: Word
- Producer: Ian Eskelin

Point of Grace chronology
Turn Up the Music: The Hits of Point of Grace (2011)	A Thousand Little Things (2012)	Directions Home (2015)

A Thousand Little Things is an album by Christian group Point of Grace and their twelfth studio release. It was released on May 1, 2012.

== Track listing ==
1. "Good Enough" (Shelley Breen, Leigh Cappillino, Denise Jones, Steven Dale Jones, Cindy Morgan) - 3:03
2. "Heaven Knows" (Ben Glover, Tim James) - 3:19
3. "A Thousand Little Things" (Breen, Cappillino, Jones, Ian Eskelin, Tony Wood) - 2:41
4. "Only Jesus" (Christa Wells, Nicole Witt) - 3:49
5. "What I Already Know" (Scotty Alexander, Michael Boggs, Bryan White) - 3:52
6. "Might Be Today" (Breen, Cappillino, Jones, Connie Harrington, Jill Paquette) – 3:13
7. "Wash Me Away" (Ian Eskelin, Nicole Witt, Tony Wood) - 3:03
8. "You Be The One" (Cindy Morgan, Nicole Witt) - 4:05
9. "I Believe In You" (Dedication Song) (Cindy Morgan, Laurie Smith) - 4:10
10. "Saving Jesus" (Chad Cates, Jeffrey East, Tony Wood) - 3:33

== Personnel ==
Point of Grace

- Shelley Breen – vocals
- Denise Jones – vocals
- Leigh Cappillino – vocals

Musicians

- Tim Lauer – keyboards, organ, string arrangements
- Michael Boggs – acoustic guitar
- Brandon Hood – acoustic guitar, banjo, mandolin
- Bryan Sutton – acoustic guitar, banjo, mandolin
- Mike Payne – electric guitars
- Tony Lucido – bass guitar
- Ben Phillips – drums
- Eric Darken – percussion
- John Catchings – cello
- Kris Wilkinson – viola
- David Angell – violin
- David Davidson – violin
- Craig Nelson – upright bass

== Production ==
- Susan Riley – A&R
- Ian Eskelin – producer
- Marc Lacuesta – vocal producer, vocal recording, string recording
- Aaron Shannon – engineer
- Ainslie Grosser – mixing
- Andrew Mendelson – mastering at Georgetown Masters (Nashville, Tennessee)
- Shawn Williams – music copyist
- Jason Jenkins – A&R administration
- Jamie Kiner – production coordinator
- Shane Tarleton – creative director
- Katherine Petillo – art direction
- Sally Carnes Gulde – design
- Kristin Barlowe – photography
- David Kaufman – wardrobe
- Megan Thompson – hair stylist, makeup
