= Forever Jones =

Christian gospel group

foreverJONES
- Genres: Christian, gospel
- Label: EMI Gospel
- Members: Dewitt Jones III; Kim Jones; D'Jeniele' Hooten; DeWitt Jones IV; Judah Jones; Dominique Jones; Mya Joy Grace Jones
- Website: http://foreverjones.emigospel.com/

Forever Jones (usually stylized as forever JONES) is a Christian gospel group formed by husband and wife Dewitt and Kim Jones and their five children.

== Band history ==
Husband and wife Dewitt and Kim Jones grew up in Washington and came from musical backgrounds in their families. They had been writing songs since the 90s. Dewitt enjoyed some success as a songwriter when singer Ron Kenoly recorded Dewitt's song "Use Me" for the 1994 album God Is Able. The song has since become a staple in many churches and has been covered several times, most notably by the Grammy-winning Brooklyn Tabernacle Choir.

Dewitt says that God gave him a "specific call" one time to start the group. Forever Jones was then formed with their five children: D'Jeniele, Dewitt, Judah, Dominique ("DOE"), and Mya Joy Grace. The Jones family's manager and friend was singer/producer Jeoffrey Benward. He then introduced them to writer/producer Tommy Sims, who agreed to produce their debut album. The album Get Ready was released on 2010 receiving favorable critics.

In 2011, the band received three Dove Award nominations for New Artist of the Year, Contemporary Gospel Album of the Year, and Contemporary Recorded Song of the Year at the 42nd GMA Dove Awards. They were also nominated for two Grammy Awards at the 53rd Grammy Awards: Best Contemporary R&B Gospel Album and Best Gospel Performance.

Dewitt and Kim Jones pastor together at King's Chapel Dallas, an extension of King's Cathedral and Chapels based in Kahului, Hawaii.

Judah Jones was a wide receiver and running back for Bill Snyder's Kansas State Wildcats, and was listed as a redshirt freshman in 2014. In his first game on August 30, 2014, he recorded 2 rushes for 24 yards and one punt return for 26 yards.

== Band members ==
- Dewitt Jones III
- Kim Jones
- D'Jeniele' Hooten
- Dewitt Jones IV
- Judah Jones
- Dominique "DOE" Jones
- Mya Joy Grace Jones

== Discography ==
- Get Ready (2010)
- Musical Revival (2012)
- Prayer Tools, Vol. 1 (2014)

== Awards ==
GMA Dove Awards

Year	Award	Result
2011	New Artist of the Year	Nominated
2011	Contemporary Gospel Album of the Year (Get Ready)	Nominated
2011	Contemporary Gospel Recorded Song of the Year ("He Wants It All")	Nominated

Grammy Awards

Year	Award	Result
2011	Best Gospel Performance ("He Wants It All")	Nominated
2011	Best Contemporary R&B Gospel Album (Get Ready)	Nominated
