= Directions Home =

Directions Home (Songs We Love, Songs You Know)

Studio album by Point of Grace
- Released: April 7, 2015
- Recorded: 2013–2014
- Genre: Christian pop, country pop, Christian country, bluegrass, southern gospel
- Length: 40:55
- Label: Word Records
- Producer: Stuart Dill; Andy Leftwich; Roger Ryan; Point of Grace

Point of Grace chronology
A Thousand Little Things (2012)	Directions Home (Songs We Love, Songs You Know) (2015)	Recollections (2018)

Directions Home (Songs We Love, Songs You Know) is the sixteenth album and tenth studio album by Christian group Point of Grace. It was released on April 7, 2015.

== Critical reception ==
Professional ratings
Review scores
Source	Rating
365 Days of Inspiring Media	4/5 stars
CCM Magazine	3.5/5 stars
Christian Music Review	4/5 stars
Christian Review Magazine	4/5 stars
New Release Today	4/5 stars

Awarding the album three and a half stars for CCM Magazine, Andy Argyrakis lauded "the instantly appealingly, earthy nature of this faith-filled nurturing collection." Kevin Davis, giving the album four stars at New Release Today, wrote, "really engaged by the emotional vocals and the prayerful lyrics found in these sacred songs." Felicia Abraham, reviewing the album for Charisma, noted that Point of Grace made the album "without conforming to the restraints of any given genre."

Rating the album four stars from Christian Music Review, Kelly Meade says, "Point Of Grace makes a solid effort with these tracks giving us an album that not only is pleasant to the ear but also thought-provoking calling the attention towards our Creator." Joshua Andre, in a four-star review for 365 Days of Inspiring Media, wrote, "Directions Home is an album to be savored, and listened to again and again." In a four-star review at Christian Review Magazine, Leah St. John wrote, "their vocals really shine on Directions Home."

== Track listing ==
No.	Title	Writer(s)	Length
1.	"A Life That's Good"	Ashley Monroe, Sarah Siskind	3:24
2.	"Only Love"	Marcus Hummon, Roger Murrah	4:18
3.	"Directions Home" (featuring Vince Gill)	Stephanie Chapman	3:37
4.	"Something in the Water"	Chris DeStefano, Brett James, Carrie Underwood	3:57
5.	"Friend of a Wounded Heart"	Claire Cloninger, Wayne Watson	4:51
6.	"Lord, I Need You"	Daniel Carson, Matt Maher, Christy Nockels. Jesse Reeves, Kristian Stanfill	3:54
7.	"Home"	Greg Holden, Drew Pearson	3:27
8.	"You're Gonna Miss This"	Ashley Gorley, Lee Thomas Miller	4:06
9.	"Two Roads" (featuring Ricky Skaggs)	Cindy Morgan, Lola Morgan	4:48
10.	"The Climb"	Jesse Alexander, Jon Mabe	4:33
Total length:			40:55

== Personnel ==
Point of Grace

- Shelley Breen – vocals
- Leigh Cappillino – vocals
- Denise Jones – vocals

Musicians

- Blair Masters – acoustic piano, dulcimer
- Mike Rojas – acoustic piano, organ, synthesizers
- Roger Ryan – acoustic piano, vocal arrangements
- Jeff Taylor – acoustic piano, accordion, pump organ, penny whistle
- Scott Denté – acoustic guitar
- Stuart Dill – acoustic guitar
- Bryan Sutton – acoustic guitar
- Jeff King – electric guitar
- Jerry McPherson – electric guitar
- Rob Ickes – guitars, dobro, Weissenborn lap steel guitar
- Andy Leftwich – banjo, fiddle, mandolin, violin
- Ricky Skaggs – mandolin (9), vocals (9), narrator ( 9)
- Mark Hill – electric bass
- Byron House – electric bass, upright bass
- Steve Brewster – drums, percussion, programming
- Matt Slocum – cello
- Vince Gill – vocals (3)
- Rachel Leftwich – vocal arrangements

== Production ==
- Stuart Dill – executive producer, producer (4)
- Point of Grace – producers (1–3, 5–9)
- Andy Leftwich – producer (1–3, 5–9)
- Roger Ryan – producer (10)
- Richie Biggs – engineer, mixing
- Jasper Lemaster – engineer
- Jeff Pitzer – engineer
- Ainslie Grosser – mixing
- Mark Capps – vocal recording
- Matt Rausch – vocal recording for Vince Gill (3)
- Andrew Darby – assistant engineer
- Steve Dewey – assistant engineer
- Andrew Mendelson – mastering at Georgetown Masters (Nashville, Tennessee).
- Natthaphol Abhigantaphand – mastering assistant
- Adam Grover – mastering assistant
- Nicole Curtis – A&R administration
- Jamie Haymes – A&R administration
- Ceele Dennis – production assistant
- Shane Tarleton – creative director
- Katherine Petillo – art direction, design
- Robby Klein – photography

== Chart performance ==
Chart (2015)	Peak position
US Christian Albums (Billboard)	26

== Awards and nominations ==
In 2015, the album was nominated for a Dove Award for 'Bluegrass/Country Album of the Year'. It was also nominated for a Grammy Award for 'Best Roots Gospel Album' in 2016.
