= Geron Davis =

- Born: December 1, 1960 (age 65)
- Origin: Bogalusa, Louisiana
- Genres: Gospel music, Christian music
- Occupations: Pianist, singer, songwriter
- Years active: 1983–present
- Labels: Meadowgreen Music, Integrity Music/Integrity's Hosanna! Music, Brentwood-Benson, Spirit-Led Records, Praise Gathering Music Group, SpiritSound Music Group, Lillenas Publishing, DaviShop Publishing, Sunset Gallery Publishing

Geron Davis (born December 1, 1960) is a musician, best known as a composer. He was first signed by Meadowgreen Music and is known for penning the song "Holy Ground".

Davis married Becky Davis and they have collectively written numerous songs including, "In the Presence of Jehovah", "Mercy Saw Me", "Send It On Down", "Holy of Holies", "Gentle Hands", "Peace Speaker", "I’m Gonna Make It", "Evermore", and "Something About My Praise". Davis, also a vocalist, asked his sister Alyson Lovern and her husband Shelton to join him and Becky in forming the group named Kindred Souls, and have been recording and performing together for more than twenty years. They released their debut album, Let It Rain, in 2002 which gained considerable attention on AC charts.

== Discography ==
- 1985: Let It Shine (featuring the Alexandria Sanctuary Choir)
- 1985: Shine On (featuring the Alexandria Sanctuary Choir)
- 1987: Holy Ground (featuring the Alexandria Sanctuary Choir)
- 1987: Straight From The Heart (Pathway Music)
- 1993: Praisin'... Live (featuring the Alexandria Sanctuary Choir – SpiritSong [a Division of Pathway Music])
- 1993: Send It On Down (featuring the Alexandria Sanctuary Choir)
- 1993: Send It On Down (featuring the Alexandria Sanctuary Choir – Praise Gathering Music Group)
- 1994: Holy Ground (produced by Tom Brooks, Integrity's Hosanna! Music)
- 1995: We Hold These Truths (Integrity)
- 1995: When It’s Christmastime (Gaither)
- 1998: Portraits of Worship Live, Volume 1 – Featuring Westgate Chapel (Producer/Worship Leader, Geron Davis – Spirit-Led Records)
- 1999: It Took a Lamb (produced & arranged by J. Daniel Smith – Integrity's Hosanna! Music)
- 2001: Offer Up This Praise (Brentwood-Benson)
- 2002: Hope Has Come (Integrity Media)
- 2002: Let It Rain – Geron Davis & Kindred Souls (Vital/Daywind Records)
- 2002: Song of Praise (arranged/produced by Geron Davis & Bradley Knight – SpiritSound Music Group)
- 2004: Closer (arranged/produced by Geron Davis & Bradley Knight – Brentwood-Benson)
- 2005: Sing Joy: Christmas (featuring Grace Baptist Worship Choir, Knoxville, TN; Brentwood-Benson)
- 2006: Peace Speaker (Brentwood-Benson)
- 2006: Send It On Up (featuring the Mount Paran Church of God Festival Choir, arranged/produced by Geron Davis & J. Daniel Smith – Praise Gathering Music Group)
- 2008: Amen (Integrity's Hosanna! Music)
- 2008: Cradle That Rocked the World: Christmas with the Christ Church PrayZchoir (Benson Music)
- 2008: Hallelujah Jesus Is Born – Christmas with Geron Davis (arranged/orchestrated/produced by Bradley Knight & Geron Davis – Benson Music)
- 2008: He Is Great – Geron Davis & Kindred Souls (with the Mount Paran North New Life Singers – SpiritSound Music Group)
- 2009: A Night Of Hope – Christmas Worship (featuring Randy Phillips, Dan Dean, Geron Davis, & Dave Clark – Lillenas Publishing)
- 2009: Rejoice – Christmas Worship (Brentwood-Benson)
- 2010: All I Need – Worship with Geron Davis (Choir & Orch version – Brentwood-Benson)
- 2010: Everywhere – Worship with Geron Davis (Praise Band/Praise Team version – Brentwood-Benson)
- 2011: Where Praise Begins – A Worship Collection (featuring Randy Phillips, Dan Dean, Geron Davis, & Dave Clark – Lillenas Publishing)
- 2012: He Is Great (SpiritSound Music Group)
- 2012: Gone... A Resurrection Worship Experience (feat. Clint Brown & The Central Sanctuary Choir – SpiritSound Music)
- 2012: Let the Light Shine – David Scott (feat. Geron Davis, "Let The Light Shine")
- 2013: Holy Ground (Integrity)
- 2021: Shalom – Jasmine Brady (feat. Geron Davis & Kindred Souls, "God Is in Control" – Regeneration Music Group)
- 2021: Timeless Classics Hymns (SpiritSound)
