= Winter Wonderland (Point of Grace album) =

Studio album by Point of Grace
- Released: October 4, 2005
- Venue: The Philadelphia Cathedral (Philadelphia, Pennsylvania)
- Studio: Ocean Way Nashville and Oxford Sound (Nashville, Tennessee); Abbey Road Studios (London, UK)
- Genre: Christian pop, Christmas
- Length: 43:35
- Label: Word Records
- Producer: Brown Bannister

Point of Grace chronology
I Choose You (2004)	Winter Wonderland (2005)	How You Live (2007)

Professional ratings
Review scores
Source	Rating
Allmusic	4.5/5 stars

Winter Wonderland is the eleventh album by Contemporary Christian group Point of Grace and their second Christmas album, after 1999's A Christmas Story. It was released in 2005 by Word Records.

== Track listing ==
1. "It's the Most Wonderful Time of the Year" (Edward Pola; George Wyle) - 2:52
2. "Winter Wonderland" (Dick Smith; Felix Bernard) - 3:14
3. "Let There Be Light" featuring John David Webster (Marie Reynolds; Scott Krippayne) - 4:42
4. "Jingle Bells" (James Lord Pierpont) - 5:10
5. "Breath of Heaven (Mary's Song)" (Amy Grant; Chris Eaton) - 5:41
6. "In the First Light" (Robert John Kauflin) - 3:34
7. "Santa Medley" (Gene Autry; Johnny Marks; Oakley Haldeman; Steve Nelson; Walter Rollins) - 5:01
  - "Here Comes Santa Claus" (Gene Autry and Oakley Haldeman)
  - "Frosty the Snowman" (Jack Rollins and Steve Nelson)
  - "Rudolph, the Red-Nosed Reindeer" (Johnny Marks)
8. "Little Town" (Phillips Brooks; Lewis H. Redner; Chris Eaton) - 4:06
9. "For Unto Us" (George Frederick Handel) - 4:48
10. "All Is Well" featuring Michael W. Smith (Michael W. Smith; Wayne Kirkpatrick) - 4:21

== Personnel ==
Point of Grace

- Shelley Breen – vocals
- Heather Payne – vocals
- Denise Jones – vocals
- Leigh Cappillino – vocals

Musicians

- Shane Keister – acoustic piano (1–5, 7, 8)
- Blair Masters – keyboards (1, 3, 5, 7, 8)
- Michael J. Nelson – synthesizer intro (3)
- Michael W. Smith – acoustic piano (10)
- Tom Bukovac – electric guitar (1, 3, 5, 7, 8)
- Jerry Kimbrough – acoustic guitar (1, 3, 8), guitars (2, 4), electric guitar (3)
- George Cocchini – electric guitar (3)
- David Hungate – bass (1–5, 7, 8), archtop guitar (7)
- Dan Needham – drums (1, 3, 5, 7, 8)
- Paul Leim – drums (2, 4)
- Eric Darken – percussion (2, 4)
- Mark Douthit – saxophones (2, 4)
- Barry Green – trombone (2, 4)
- Mike Haynes – trumpet (2, 4)
- Lee Levine – bass clarinet (4), clarinet (4)
- Sam Levine – flute (4)
- Carl Marsh – orchestra arrangements and conductor (1, 3, 7–10), vocal arrangements (2, 4), boys choir arrangements (5, 9)
- Gavyn Wright – concertmaster (1, 3, 5, 7–10)
- The London Session Orchestra – orchestra (1, 3, 5, 7–10)
- Michael Mellett – vocal arrangements (1, 3, 5, 7–9)
- Tim Davis – vocal arrangements (6)
- John David Webster – vocals (3)
- The Philadelphia Boys Choir – choir (5, 9)
- Jeffrey Smith – choir director (5, 9)

== Production ==
- Michael Blanton – executive producer
- Brown Bannister – producer
- Tim Davis – vocal producer (2, 4)
- Steve Bishir – recording (tracks, overdubs, strings), mixing
- Andrew Dudman – assistant string engineer
- Aaron Sternke – digital editing
- Ted Jensen – mastering at Sterling Sound (New York, NY)
- Burton Brooks – A&R administration
- Traci Sterling Bishir – production coordinator
- Katherine Petillo – art direction
- Sally Carnes Gulde– design
- Aaron Rapoport – photography
- Blair Burle – senior creative administrator
- David Kaufman – wardrobe
- Josh Grimes – hair stylist
- Tobie Orr – make-up
- Lori Casteel – music preparation
- Mike Casteel – music preparation
- Stephen Lamb – music preparation
- Eberhard Ramm – music preparation
- Blanton Harrell Cooke & Corzine – management
