= Hole in the World =

Eagles song

Single by Eagles

from the album The Very Best Of
- B-side: "Hole in the World" (video)
- Released: July 15, 2003
- Recorded: Early 2003
- Length: 4:30
- Label: The Eagles Recording Company II
- Songwriters: Don Henley, Glenn Frey
- Producers: Eagles, Bill Szymczyk

Eagles singles chronology
"Love Will Keep Us Alive" (1994)	"Hole in the World" (2003)	"No More Cloudy Days" (2006)

"Hole in the World" is a song by the Eagles, written by Don Henley and Glenn Frey, in response to the September 11, 2001 attacks and subsequent war on Iraq, released in 2003.

This is the first Eagles recording without guitarist Don Felder since 1974, and it was released as a DVD single with some bonus tracks: the "Hole in the World" Stereo Mix & 5.1 Multichannel track, the video, outtakes from the video and a trailer for the DVD Farewell 1 Tour-Live from Melbourne.

"Hole in the World" appears on the 2003 compilation album The Very Best Of, as well as the DVD (only in the first edition). It was also included as a bonus track on the Deluxe Edition of the 2007 album Long Road Out of Eden.

It was nominated for the Grammy Award for Best Pop Performance by a Duo or Group with Vocals in 2004.

== Track listing ==
1. "Hole in the World" (5.1 Multichannel Track) – 4:36
2. "Hole in the World" (Video) – 4:43
3. "Making the Video (Outtakes from the Hole in the World)" – 2:36
4. "Backstage Pass to Farewell 1" – 4:53
5. "Hole in the World" (Audio Stereo Mix) – 4:30

== Personnel ==
Eagles

- Don Henley: drums, lead and harmony vocals
- Glenn Frey: Fender Rhodes electric piano, acoustic guitar, harmony vocals
- Timothy B. Schmit: bass guitar, harmony vocals
- Joe Walsh: Hammond organ, harmony vocals

Additional musicians

- Steuart Smith: electric guitar
- Will Hollis: acoustic piano
- Scott F. Crago: percussion

=== Production ===
- Producer: Eagles, Bill Szymczyk
- Engineer: Steve Churchyard
- Additional engineers: Richard Davis, Mike Harlow, Andy Ackland
- Video director: Martyn Atkins
- Video editor: Randy Edwards, Manny Merchan, William Bullen
- Camera operator: Cameron Duncan
- Graphic design, camera operator: James Raitt
- Photography director, production coordinator: James Meyer
- Design, art direction: Jeri Heiden
- Photography: James Minchin

== Charts ==
=== Weekly charts ===
Chart (2003)	Peak position
US Billboard Hot 100	69
US Adult Contemporary (Billboard)	5
US Adult Pop Airplay (Billboard)	38

=== Year-end charts ===
Chart (2003)	Position
US Adult Contemporary (Billboard)	15
