= Life, Love & Other Mysteries =

1996 album by Point of Grace

Studio album by Point of Grace
- Released: September 9, 1996
- Studios: Woodland Digital, Masterfonics/Studio Six, Javelina Studios, OmniSound Studios, The Music Mill, Uno Mas Studio, Quad Studios and Great Circle Sound (Nashville, Tennessee); Tejas Recorders, Studio at Mole End, The Sound Kitchen and The Bennett House (Franklin, Tennessee)
- Genre: Christian pop
- Length: 40:29
- Labels: Word Records; Epic Records
- Producers: Michael Omartian; Phil Naish; Scott Williamson; Blair Masters

Point of Grace chronology
The Whole Truth (1995)	Life, Love & Other Mysteries (1996)	Steady On (1998)

Singles from Life, Love & Other Mysteries
- 1. "Keep the Candle Burning" Released: September 1996; 2. "You Are the Answer" Released: January 1997; 3. "Circle of Friends" Released: April 1997; 4. "That's the Way It's Meant to Be" Released: September 1997

Professional ratings
Review scores
Source	Rating
Allmusic	3/5 stars

Life, Love & Other Mysteries (stylized as life love & other mysteries) is the third album by contemporary Christian music group Point of Grace. It was released in 1996 by Word and Epic Records.

Two tie-ins to the album were released: a video, subtitled The Video Story, and an autobiography by the group, written with Davin Seay.

== Background ==
The group characterized the album as their hardest to record. They called it a "growing pain" because John Mays, who had signed them to Word Records, had left the label. Shortly afterward, Word was sold, leaving the group to make all major decisions independently.

Music videos were filmed for "Keep the Candle Burning" and "That's the Way It's Meant to Be," and a live video was released for "Circle of Friends." The "Keep the Candle Burning" video featured footage from the group's four-city tour on the album's release day, including shots from the Dallas Mavericks' jet showing Terry Jones' husband Chris, Denise Jones' husband Stu, and Shelley Breen's then-fiancé David, whom she married later that year.

"Circle of Friends" has been regarded as the group's signature song; a book by the group and their fan club both share this title. The current trio served as background vocalists on Kenny Rogers' cover of the song on his 2011 album The Love of God. Breen originally did not want to record the song, as she thought it was "kitschy, like a campfire song [or] 'Kumbaya' or something."

Since Heather Payne departed from the group in 2008, they have performed the song "Keep the Candle Burning" as a medley with "The Great Divide," and "You Are the Answer" as a medley with "I'll Be Believing."

In addition to the album, an autobiographical book by the same title, subtitled "Advice and Inspiration from America's #1 Christian Pop Group," was released in October 1996. A video titled Life, Love & Other Mysteries: The Video Story was released in 1997.

== Track listing ==
No.	Title	Writer(s)	Producer	Length
1.	"Life, Love & Other Mysteries"	Joel Lindsay, Regie Hamm	Scott Williamson	4:03
2.	"Keep the Candle Burning"	Gayla Borders, Jeff Borders, Lowell Alexander	Phil Naish	4:26
3.	"That's the Way It's Meant to Be"	Bruce Sudano, Michael Omartian	Omartian	3:31
4.	"Jesus Doesn't Care"	Scott Krippayne, Tony Wood	Williamson, Blair Masters	4:43
5.	"Gone Are the Dark Days"	Gayla Borders, Jeff Borders, Phil Madeira	Williamson	4:11
6.	"Sing a Song"	Al McKay, Maurice White	Omartian	3:39
7.	"Any Road, Any Cost"	Krippayne, Wood	Omartian	4:17
8.	"You Are the Answer"	Hamm, Matt Huesmann	Naish	3:50
9.	"God Forbid"	Huesmann, Kyle Matthews	Omartian	3:34
10.	"Circle of Friends"	Douglas McKelvey, Steve Siler	Naish	4:15

== The Video Story ==
Life, Love & Other Mysteries: The Video Story

Video by Point of Grace
- Released: 1997
- Genre: Christian pop
- Length: 60 minutes
- Label: Word Records

Point of Grace chronology
Life, Love & Other Mysteries: The Video Story (1997)	7 (2003)

A tie-in video, Life, Love & Other Mysteries: The Video Story, was released in 1997. The video includes the music videos for "Keep the Candle Burning" and "That's the Way It's Meant to Be," as well as four live performances, and interviews with the group as well as their husbands and songwriter/producer Michael Omartian. In addition to the two studio videos, the live performance of "Circle of Friends" was released as a promo video, and was included on the WOW 1998 video and DVD.

No.	Title	Length
1.	"I'll Be Believing" (Live)
2.	"Life, Love & Other Mysteries" (Live)
3.	"That's the Way It's Meant to Be"
4.	"Jesus Doesn't Care" (Live)
5.	"Keep the Candle Burning"
6.	"Circle of Friends" (Live)

== Personnel ==
Point of Grace

- Shelley Breen – lead vocals (1, 3, 5–7, 10), backing vocals
- Denise Jones – lead vocals (1–4, 6, 10), backing vocals
- Terry Jones – lead vocals (1, 3, 5, 6, 8, 10), backing vocals
- Heather Payne – lead vocals (1–3, 6, 9, 10), backing vocals

Musicians

- Byron Hagan – Hammond organ (1)
- Cheryl Rogers – acoustic piano (1, 5)
- Phil Naish – keyboards (2, 8, 10), Hammond B3 organ (8, 10)
- Michael Omartian – keyboards (3, 6, 7, 9), acoustic piano (7, 9)
- Blair Masters – keyboards (4)
- Tim Akers – keyboards (7, 9), synthesizer (7, 9)
- David Cleveland – guitars (1, 5)
- Dann Huff – electric guitars (2, 8, 10), guitar solo (2)
- Sonny Lallerstedt – acoustic guitar (2, 10), electric guitars (8)
- Jerry McPherson – guitars (3, 4, 6, 7, 9)
- Stuart Duncan – mandolin (7)
- Jackie Street – bass (1, 4, 5)
- Jimmie Lee Sloas – bass (2, 7–10)
- Chris Kent – bass (3, 6)
- Scott Williamson – drums (1, 5, 7)
- Scott Meeder – drums (2, 8, 10), programming (2), percussion (10)
- Chris McHugh – drums (3, 6)
- Dan Needham – drums (4)
- Eric Darken – percussion (1, 3–7, 9)
- Mark Douthit – saxophones (3, 6)
- Doug Moffett – saxophones (3, 6)
- Jeff Bailey – trumpet (3, 6)
- Mike Haynes – trumpet (3, 6)

Music arrangements

- Dan Muckala – track arrangements (1)
- Scott Williamson – track arrangements (1, 5), vocal arrangements (1, 4, 5)
- Point of Grace – vocal arrangements (1, 2, 4, 5, 8, 10)
- Phil Naish – vocal arrangements (2, 8, 10)
- Cheryl Rogers – vocal arrangements (2, 8, 10)
- Blair Masters – track arrangements (4)
- Jeff Borders – track arrangements (5)

== Production ==
- Point of Grace – executive producers
- Lynn Keesecker – A&R direction
- Cheryl Rogers – vocal co-producer (2, 8, 10)
- Ronnie Brookshire – engineer, mixing (2, 4, 8, 10)
- Terry Christian – engineer, mixing (3, 6, 7, 9)
- David Schober – engineer, mixing (1, 5)
- Tim Coyle – additional engineer, mix assistant (1, 5)
- David Dillbeck – additional engineer, mix assistant (2, 8, 10)
- Doug Sarrett – additional engineer
- Scott Williamson – additional engineer
- Tony Castle – assistant engineer
- Eric Elwell – assistant engineer
- Marc Frigo – assistant engineer
- Shawn McLean – assistant engineer
- Greg Parker – assistant engineer
- Aaron Swihart – assistant engineer
- Nick Sparks – assistant engineer
- Jason White – assistant engineer
- John Thomas II – mix assistant (3, 6, 7, 9)
- Mel Jones – mix assistant (4)
- Ken Love – mastering at MasterMix (Nashville, Tennessee)
- Bridgett Evans O'Lannerghty – production coordinator (2, 8, 10)
- Suzy Martinez – production coordinator (3, 6, 7, 9)
- Christy Coxe – art direction
- Chuck Hargett – design
- Michael Haber – photography
- Patrick Swan – hair stylist
- I.B. Fishman – make-up
- Mike Atkins – management

== Reception ==
Allmusic gave the album three out of five stars. Dial-the-Truth Ministries, however, criticized Point of Grace for covering "Sing a Song" by Earth, Wind & Fire because of that group's new age influence.
