= How You Live =

Studio album by Point of Grace
- Released: August 28, 2007
- Recorded: 2006, 2007
- Studio: The Tracking Room, Oxford Sound, Townsend Sound Studios and Seventeen Grand Recording (Nashville, Tennessee); The Puget Sound (Spring Hill, Tennessee); Apollo Sound Productions (Clearwater, Florida)
- Genre: Christian pop
- Length: 49:49 (Standard Release); 1:01:56 (Deluxe Edition)
- Label: Word Records
- Producer: Brown Bannister; Nathan Chapman (Deluxe Edition)

Point of Grace chronology
Winter Wonderland (2005)	How You Live (2007)	Tennessee Christmas: A Holiday Collection (2008)

Singles from How You Live
- 1. "All the World"; 2. "You Are Good"; 3. "How You Live (Turn Up the Music)"; 4. "Fearless Heart"; 5. "Heal the Wound"; 6. "I Wish"; 7. "King of the World"

Alternative cover
- Deluxe Edition cover

How You Live is the twelfth album and seventh studio album from contemporary Christian music group Point of Grace. It was released on August 28, 2007, and has achieved critical and commercial success, peaking at #56 on the Billboard 200 and at #4 on the Billboard Christian & Gospel Album Charts.

The success of the single "How You Live (Turn Up The Music)" earned the group the Dove Award for Country Recorded Song of the Year. The song's writer, Cindy Morgan, was awarded the Songwriter of the Year award, and the girls were nominated for four more awards. At the performance of the song on the live telecast, the girls were accompanied by Morgan on the piano, and their own Denise Jones on guitar.

This was also the group's last album as a quartet, as Heather Payne announced her retirement in June 2008, after in late 2007 she had given birth to her fourth child, a daughter, Ava.

Due to Payne's departure and the group's increasing popularity within the country music market, Warner Music Group commissioned a re-release of the album, labeled "deluxe edition." This edition added two new songs and an acoustic version of the title track.

== Track listing ==
Standard edition
No.	Title	Writer(s)	Length
1.	"All the World"	Jason Ingram; Sam Mizell	4:32
2.	"Fearless Heart"	Scott Krippayne; Jill Tomalty; Tony Wood	3:46
3.	"How You Live (Turn Up the Music)"	Mark McKenzie; Cindy Morgan	4:27
4.	"Any Way"	Connie Harrington; Kelly Minter	4:11
5.	"He Believes In You"	Rodney Clawson; Harrington	4:02
6.	"You Are Good"	Clint Lagerberg; Nichole Nordeman	4:08
7.	"Fight"	Mizell; Zach Nielsen	3:49
8.	"On God's Green Earth"	Twila LaBar; Joel Lindsay	5:37
9.	"Heal the Wound"	Lagerberg; Nordeman	4:22
10.	"Broken Thing"	Lagerberg; Tomalty	4:00
11.	"Because You Are"	Scott Phillips	3:58
12.	"Before the Throne of Grace"	Krippayne; Wood	2:49

Family Christian Stores exclusive edition
No.	Title	Writer(s)	Length
13.	"Steady On" (live)	Grant Cunningham; Matt Huesmann
14.	"Day by Day" (live)	Christa Wells; Tiffany Arbuckle Lee
15.	"All Hail the Power of Jesus' Name"	Edward Perronet; Oliver Holden
16.	"In the First Light"	Robert John Kauflin

Deluxe edition
No.	Title	Writer(s)	Length
13.	"I Wish"	Phil Madeira; Morgan	3:33
14.	"King of the World"	Morgan	4:12
15.	"How You Live (Turn Up the Music)" (acoustic)	McKenzie; Morgan	4:24

== Personnel ==
Point of Grace

- Shelley Breen – lead vocals (2, 6–8, 10, 11), backing vocals
- Leigh Cappillino – lead vocals (2, 5, 6, 8, 9, 11), backing vocals
- Denise Jones – lead vocals (2, 4, 6–8, 11), backing vocals
- Heather Payne – lead vocals (1–3, 5, 6, 8, 11), backing vocals

Musicians

- Blair Masters – keyboards (1–11)
- John Hobbs – acoustic piano (1–11)
- Bryan Sutton – acoustic guitar (1–11), banjo (1–11), mandolin (1, 2, 10)
- Tom Bukovac – electric guitar (1–11)
- Jerry McPherson – electric guitar (1, 2, 5, 7)
- George Cocchini – electric guitar (5)
- Paul Franklin – steel guitar (3, 4, 6–9, 11)
- Matt Pierson – bass (1–11)
- Shannon Forrest – drums (1–11)
- Stuart Duncan – fiddle (4, 8, 11)
- Carl Marsh – orchestral arrangements (3, 9)
- James Fitzpatrick – contractor (3, 9)
- City of Prague Philharmonic Orchestra – orchestra (3, 9)

== Production ==
- Michael Blanton – executive producer
- Conor Farley – A&R
- Tim Marshall – A&R
- Brown Bannister – producer
- Steve Bishir – recording, mixing (2, 3, 5, 7)
- David Zaffiro – mixing (1, 8–10, 12)
- Gary Paczosa – mixing (4, 6, 11)
- Brandon Bell – mix assistant
- Aaron Sternke – digital editing
- Bill Whittington – digital editing
- Adam Ayan – mastering at Gateway Mastering (Portland, Maine)
- Traci Sterling Bishir – production coordinator
- Cheryl McTyre – A&R administration
- Katherine Petillo – creative director
- Jeremy Cowart – photography
- David Kaufman – wardrobe

== Singles ==
- "All The World"
- "You Are Good"
- "How You Live (Turn Up The Music)"
- "Fearless Heart"
- "Heal The Wound"
- "I Wish"
- "King of the World"

== Music videos ==
- "How You Live" (Erwin Brothers, directors)
- "I Wish" (Erwin Brothers, directors)

== Awards ==
In 2008, the album was nominated for a Dove Award for Pop/Contemporary Album of the Year at the 39th GMA Dove Awards. The song "How You Live (Turn Up the Music)" won the award for Country Recorded Song of the Year.
