= Robert Sterling (musician) =

American songwriter

Robert Sterling is an American songwriter, arranger, and record producer. His songs have been recorded by a variety of Christian artists, notably including Point of Grace, Gold City and Sandi Patty. His tunes have worked their way to the top of the Christian pop, Southern Gospel, and inspirational radio charts. Among Sterling's record producing credits are the certified gold albums, Point of Grace, and The Whole Truth, by Point.

His extensive body of choral compositions and arrangements can be found in the catalogs of Word Music, Belwin Mills, Shawnee Press, and LifeWay Music. Robert is a five-time winner of the Gospel Music Association's Dove Award. For five years he headed the songwriting faculty for the Academy of Gospel Music Arts. In 1997, Robert served as the chairman of the Coalition for the Protection of America’s Gospel Music Heritage, lobbying and testifying before Congress on behalf of Christian songwriters. In addition to his work as a writer, arranger and orchestrator, Sterling has also served as an adjunct professor of Music Publishing at Belmont University in Nashville, Tennessee.

A 1977 cum laude graduate of Baylor University's School of Music, Sterling currently resides in Brentwood, Tennessee with his wife, Cindy. They have two sons, including drummer Aaron Sterling
