= Point of Grace (album) =

Studio album by Point of Grace
- Released: August 23, 1993
- Studio: Recording Arts and Quad Studios (Nashville, Tennessee)
- Genre: Christian pop
- Length: 44:19
- Label: Word
- Producer: Robert Sterling; Scott Williamson

Point of Grace chronology
Point of Grace (1993)	The Whole Truth (1995)

Singles from Point of Grace
- 1. "I'll Be Believing" Released: November 1993; 2. "One More Broken Heart" Released: February 1994; 3. "Jesus Will Still Be There" Released: 1994; 4. "Faith, Hope & Love" Released: August 1994; 5. "I Have No Doubt" Released: November 1994; 6. "No More Pain" Released: December 1994

Professional ratings
Review scores
Source	Rating
Allmusic	3/5 stars

Point of Grace is the debut album by the contemporary Christian music group of the same name. It was released in 1993 by Word Records.

In 2000, the album was remastered and reissued with new artwork.

== Background, release, and legacy ==
The album produced six #1 singles on Billboard's Christian songs chart, making the group the first to achieve such a run with their debut album. One music video was filmed, for "Jesus Will Still Be There."

The group's debut single, "I'll Be Believing," was the only programmed song on the album. John Mays, then the group's A&R representative at Word Records, originally thought it would be best if it were buried in the tracklist. When the song was later performed live in 1996 on The Message About Life, Love & Other Mysteries Tour, an entirely new sequence was designed by Michael Hodge and Mark Childers. Hodge appears in the group's video for a later song, "Circle of Friends," which was recorded on that tour. Since Heather Payne's departure from the group in 2008, the song has been performed as a medley with "You Are the Answer" from the album Life, Love & Other Mysteries.

The group was initially reluctant to record "Faith, Hope & Love," but were convinced by Mays, owing to their appreciation of R&B acts such as En Vogue. Vocals on the song were arranged by Mervyn Warren of Take 6.

"No More Pain" included a choir consisting of the group's family and friends, including Denise Jones' husband Stu.

Although "This Day" was not released as a single, it has remained a favorite among both the group and their fans, with Shelley Breen later speculating that "it [had] sold more sheet music and accompaniment tracks than anything else on the [album]."

== Track listing ==
No.	Title	Writer(s)	Length
1.	"I'll Be Believing"	Becky Thurman, Geoff Thurman	3:17
2.	"One More Broken Heart"	Dwight Liles, Jeff Slaughter	4:02
3.	"Love Enough"	Robert Sterling, Scott Williamson	4:11
4.	"Living the Legacy"	Geoff Thurman, Lowell Alexander	3:55
5.	"Jesus Will Still Be There"	Sterling, John Mandeville	4:29
6.	"I Have No Doubt"	Tommy Greer, Dawn Thomas	4:28
7.	"Faith, Hope & Love"	Ty Lacy, Kevin Stokes	4:26
8.	"Got to Be Time"	Geoff Thurman, Shawn Craig	3:30
9.	"No More Pain"	Thurman, Thurman, Michael English	4:40
10.	"Refuge of Love"	Mandeville	3:49
11.	"This Day"	Alexander	3:32

== Personnel ==
Point of Grace

- Shelley Breen – vocals
- Denise Jones – vocals
- Terry Jones – vocals
- Heather Payne – vocals

Musicians

- Joe Hogue – keyboards
- Cheryl Rogers – keyboards
- Blair Masters – keyboard and bass programming (1)
- Jerry McPherson – guitars
- Jackie Street – bass guitar (2, 4, 5, 8, 9, 11)
- Scott Williamson – drums (1, 2, 4–6, 8–11), rhythm arrangements (all tracks), vocal arrangements (1–6, 8–11), keyboard programming (3, 6, 7, 10), drum programming (3, 7), bass programming (6, 10)
- Todd Collins – drum programming (3)
- Eric Darken – percussion
- Mark Douthit – saxophones (1, 8)
- Barry Green – trombone (1, 8)
- Mike Haynes – trumpet (1, 8)
- George Tidwell – trumpet (1, 8)
- Chris McDonald – horn arrangements (1, 8)
- Robert Sterling – rhythm arrangements, vocal arrangements (1–6, 8–11)
- Mervyn Warren – vocal arrangements (7)

Friends and Family All-Volunteer Choir on "No More Pain"

- Jessica Atterberry, Cindy Bean, Frank Breeden, Frank Calderone, Shawn Cartwright, Travis Cottrell, Paul Cox, Christy Coxe, Ingrid DuMosch, Vicki Dvoracek, Kelly Garner, Steve Gatlin, Pamela Henderson, Chris Hogue, Ken Johnson, Suzie Johnson, Stu Jones, Tammi Lawson, Dianne Mays, H.L. McConnell, Larry McCoy, Cindy Morgan, David Mullen, Nicole C. Mullen, Alan Murdock, Patty O'Dells, Kelly Pody, Shawn Pody, Tami Pryce, Chance Scoggins, Joe Shell, Vicki Shell, Jeff Slaughter, Steve Smith, Lisa Springer, Cindy Sterling, Robert Sterling, Jennifer Teague, Audrey Teeter, Renee Thornton, Jerry Weimer, Aimee Joy Williamson, and Kara Williamson.

== Production ==
- John Mays – executive producer
- Robert Sterling – producer
- Scott Williamson – producer, recording
- John Jaszcz – recording, mixing
- Wayne Morgan – recording, assistant engineer
- Doug Sarrett – recording
- Barry Campbell – assistant engineer
- Hank Williams – mastering at MasterMix (Nashville, Tennessee)
- Diana Barnes – art direction
- Franke Design Co. – design
- Matthew Barnes – photography
- Mike Atkins – management for Atkins, Muse & Associates

2000 Reissue

- Chuck Hargett – design
- Louise O'Brien – photography
- Daniel Scridde – photography
