= Free to Fly =

Studio album by Point of Grace
- Released: May 1, 2001
- Recorded: 2000–2001
- Studios: American Studios, Royaltone Studios and Zi Studios (Los Angeles, California); Lavender Cottage Studios (Acosta Hills, California); Emerald Sound Studio (Nashville, Tennessee); Bridgeway Studios, Cut Above Studio, Dark Horse Recording, Sound Kitchen, Testerphonics Studio, The Bennett House and The Parlor (Franklin, Tennessee); Abbey Road Studios (London, UK)
- Genre: Christian pop
- Length: 45:53
- Label: Word Records
- Producers: David Tyson Brown Bannister Nathan Nockels Tom Laune Glenn Garrett Wayne Tester

Point of Grace chronology
Rarities & Remixes (2000)	Free to Fly (2001)	Girls of Grace (2002)

Professional ratings
Review scores
Source	Rating
Allmusic	4/5 stars

Free to Fly is the seventh album and fifth studio album by Contemporary Christian group Point of Grace. It was released in 2001 by Word Records.

== Track listing ==
1. "By Heart" (Dane DeViller, Sean Hosien, Pam Sheyne) - 3:38
2. "You Will Never Walk Alone" (Lowell Alexander) - 4:24
3. "He Sends His Love" (Jeremy Bose, Paul Evans) - 4:35
4. "Praise Forevermore" (Darlene Zschech) - 4:33
5. "Blue Skies" (Grant Cunningham, Matt Huesmann) - 4:20
6. "Begin With Me" (Steve Siler, David Tyson) - 3:15
7. "Free Indeed" (Grant Cunningham, Matt Huesmann) - 3:55
8. "All That I Need" (Glenn Garrett, Wayne Tester) - 4:08
9. "Something So Good" (Jack Blades, Brent Bourgeois, Jane Vaughan) - 3:41
10. "Yes, I Believe" (Joel Lindsay, Tony Wood) - 4:35
11. "La La La" (Brent Wilson) - 4:49

== Singles ==
- "Blue Skies" - #1
- "Praise Forevermore" - #1
- "He Sends His Love" - #1
- "You Will Never Walk Alone - #1
- "Yes, I Believe" - #5

== Music videos ==
- "Begin With Me"

== Personnel ==
Point of Grace

- Shelley Breen – vocals
- Heather Payne – vocals
- Denise Jones – vocals
- Terry Jones – vocals

Musicians

- David Tyson – keyboards (1, 7, 9, 11), programming (1, 7, 9, 11)
- Pat Coil – acoustic piano (1, 7, 9, 11)
- Michael Lattanzi – additional programming (1, 7, 9, 11)
- Bernie Herms – programming (2)
- Dan Muckala – keyboards (3, 10), programming (3, 10)
- Nathan Nockels – keyboards (4)
- Phil Madeira – Hammond B3 organ (4)
- Blair Masters – keyboards (5), acoustic piano (5), Hammond B3 organ (6)
- Wayne Tester – programming (8)
- Glenn Garrett – additional programming (8)
- Rusty Anderson – guitars (1, 7, 9, 11)
- Chris Rodriguez – guitars (1, 6, 7, 9, 11)
- Dan Deigen – acoustic guitars (1, 7, 9, 11)
- Alan Darby – nylon guitar (1, 7, 9, 11)
- Jerry McPherson – guitars (3–5, 10)
- Scott Denté – acoustic guitar (5)
- David Cleveland – guitars (8)
- Schuyler Deale – bass (1, 7, 9, 11)
- Pat Malone – bass (3, 4, 10)
- Mark Hill – bass (5)
- Jimmie Lee Sloas – bass (6)
- Brian MacLeod – drums (1, 7, 9, 11)
- Steve Brewster – drums (3–5, 10), percussion (3, 4, 10)
- Dan Needham – drums (6)
- John Catchings – cello (1, 7, 9, 11)
- The London Session Orchestra – strings (5)
- Carl Marsh – string arrangements (5)
- Gavyn Wright – concertmaster (5)
- The Nashville String Machine – strings (10)
- Tom Howard – string arrangements and conductor (10)
- Carl Gorodetzky – string contractor (10)
- Chance Scoggins – vocal arrangements (2)
- Michael Mellett – vocal arrangements (6)

== Production ==
- Point of Grace – executive producers
- Loren Balman – A&R direction
- David Tyson – producer (1, 7, 9, 11)
- Brown Bannister – producer (2, 5, 6)
- Tom Laune – producer (3, 4, 10)
- Nathan Nockels – producer (3, 4, 10)
- Glenn Garrett – producer (8)
- Wayne Tester – producer (8)
- Tony DeFranco – production assistant (1, 7, 9, 11)
- Bridgett Evans O'Lannerghty – production assistant (1, 3, 4, 7, 9–11)
- Traci Sterling Bishir – production coordinator (2, 5, 6)
- Michelle Bentrem – production coordinating assistant (2, 5, 6)
- Linda Bourne Wornell – A&R coordinator
- Chuck Hargett – art direction, design
- Michael Haber – photography
- Bertrand – hair stylist
- Antonella – make-up
- Pauline Leonard – wardrobe

Technical

- Ken Love – mastering at MasterMix (Nashville, Tennessee)
- Bill Cooper – engineer (1, 7, 9, 11)
- Michael Lattanzi – engineer (1, 7, 9, 11)
- Roger Sommers – engineer (1, 7, 9, 11)
- Tom Laune – mixing (1–4, 7–11), recording (3, 4, 10)
- Steve Bishir – recording (2, 5, 6), mixing (5, 6)
- Jonathan Allen – string recording (5)
- Aaron Swihart – track engineer (8)
- Chris Rowe – vocal engineer (8)
- Glenn Garrett – overdub engineer (8)
- Wayne Tester – overdub engineer (8)
- Jeff Thomas – overdub engineer (8)
- Ronnie Brookshire – string recording (10)
- J.C. Monterrosa – assistant engineer (1, 7, 9, 11)
- Hank Nirider – recording assistant (2, 5, 6), mix assistant (5, 6)
- Drew Bollman – assistant engineer (3, 4, 10)
- Rob Burrell – assistant engineer (3, 4, 10)
- Fred Paragano – assistant engineer (3, 4, 10)
- David Streit – assistant engineer (3, 4, 10)
- Andrew Dudman – string recording assistant (5)
- Stephen Lotz – computer editing (1, 7, 9, 11), assistant engineer (3, 4, 10)

== Notes ==
- This was Terry's last full studio album with the group, as she would leave the group on February 29, 2004.
- This was also the last album that involved songwriter Grant Cunningham, who died in July 2002 from injuries caused by a fall in a recreational soccer match in the Nashville region. A foundation named in Cunningham's memory was titled after the Point of Grace song "Blue Skies" from this album.
- This was the group's last release with the Word Records management team, as they would be released in January 2002 by the label's new owners.
