= How You Live (Turn Up the Music) =

"How You Live (Turn Up The Music)"

Single by Point of Grace

from the album How You Live
- Released: September 2007 (Contemporary Christian); February 2008 (Country)
- Recorded: 2007, 2008
- Genre: Contemporary Christian, Country
- Length: 4:30
- Label: Word Records; Curb Records; Warner Bros. Records
- Songwriter(s): Mark McKenzie; Cindy Morgan
- Producer(s): Brown Bannister

Point of Grace singles chronology
"You Are Good" (2007)	"How You Live (Turn Up The Music)" (2007)	"Fearless Heart" (2008)

"How You Live (Turn Up The Music)" is a song written by Cindy Morgan for Point of Grace's seventh studio album How You Live. It is the third single from the album and the group's first release in the country music market. It was produced by Brown Bannister.

The song was later included on the compilation album WOW Hits 2009.

== Background ==
The song's music video debuted in July 2007, but it was only released to radio that fall.

In an interview with Christian Music Today, Morgan explained that the song was intended for the secular country market, as the original opening line was "Make love in the sunlight with all the doors open." When Point of Grace expressed interest in the song, she changed the lyric to "Wake up to the sunlight," out of concern that the original lyric "was [not] going to fly with Christian radio."

== Music video ==
"How You Live (Turn Up The Music)" was the first music video shot by the group since 2001's "Begin with Me", and was the first to feature Leigh Cappillino as a member of the group. It was directed by the Erwin Brothers and was shot in Birmingham, Alabama.

The video shows images of each group member savoring special moments with their families, as well as scenes of the quartet in a vast field at sunset, and during a performance at the Alabama Theatre.

== Awards ==
In 2008, the song helped the group earn five nominations at the 39th GMA Dove Awards, including Song of the Year. The song won Country Recorded Song of the Year, while Morgan was named Songwriter of the Year.

== Live performance ==
Heather Payne is the lead vocalist in the song. When the group became a trio due to Payne's retirement, Cappillino took over the lead vocals, with Denise Jones and Shelley Breen providing the harmonies. The song has also been pitched in a slightly lower key, in order to fit Cappillino's range. The group made its debut as a trio at the Grand Ole Opry in late June 2008, showcasing their new sound.

== Chart performance ==
Chart (2007–2008)	Peak position
US Christian Songs (Billboard)	7
US Hot Country Songs (Billboard)	52
