= Steady On (Point of Grace album) =

Studio album by Point of Grace
- Released: August 4, 1998
- Studio: The Dugout, Sound Emporium Studios and Seventeen Grand Studio (Nashville, Tennessee); The Sound Kitchen (Franklin, Tennessee)
- Genre: Christian pop
- Length: 55:14
- Label: Word Records; Sony Records
- Producer: Brown Bannister

Point of Grace chronology
Life, Love & Other Mysteries (1996)	Steady On (1998)	A Christmas Story (1999)

Professional ratings
Review scores
Source	Rating
Allmusic	3/5 stars

Steady On is the fourth album by Contemporary Christian group Point of Grace. It was released in 1998 by Word and Epic Records. It was also the first time they worked with producer Brown Bannister.

== Track listing ==
1. "Steady On" (Grant Cunningham, Matt Huesmann) - 4:47
2. "My God" (Carla Sullivan) - 4:42
3. "Amazing" (Kevin Stokes, David Zaffiro) - 4:54
4. "Jesus Is" (Connie Harrington) - 4:16
5. "The Wonder Of It All" (Brent Bourgeois, Michael W. Smith) - 4:10
6. "Rain Down On Me" (Tony Miracle, Michelle Tumes) - 4:46
7. "The Song Is Alive" (Lowell Alexander, Gayla Borders, Jeff Borders) - 4:23
8. "Drawing Me Closer" (Lowell Alexander, Gayla Borders, Jeff Borders) - 5:21
9. "When The Wind Blows" (Chuck Hargett) - 4:26
10. "Saving Grace" (Grant Cunningham, Matt Huesmann) - 4:29
11. "Better Days" (Regie Hamm) - 5:06
12. "Who Am I" (Christy Nockels, Nathan Nockels) - 3:48

== Personnel ==
Point of Grace

- Shelley Breen – vocals
- Denise Jones – vocals
- Terry Jones – vocals
- Heather Payne – vocals

Musicians

- Shane Keister – Wurlitzer electric piano (1), Hammond B3 organ (2, 11), keyboards (3, 4, 10, 11), acoustic piano (10)
- Dennis Patton – keyboards (1, 2, 5), additional keyboards (3, 6, 10), programming (9)
- Michael W. Smith – keyboards (5)
- Tony Miracle – programming (6)
- Blair Masters – additional keyboards (11)
- Gordon Kennedy – guitars (1), electric guitar (2–4, 7, 8, 10, 11), acoustic guitar (8)
- Jerry McPherson – guitars (1), electric guitar (2–5, 7, 10), acoustic guitar (3, 8)
- Chris Rodriguez – guitars (1), acoustic guitar (2, 3, 8), electric guitar (4)
- Tom Hemby – acoustic guitar (2, 4, 8, 12)
- Scott Denté – acoustic guitar (7, 10)
- Phil Madeira – lap steel guitar (7, 10), Hammond B3 organ (8), electric guitar (8)
- Kenny Greenberg – electric guitar (11)
- Leland Sklar – bass (1–5, 7, 8, 10–12)
- Steve Brewster – drums (1–3, 7, 8, 10), percussion (12)
- Chad Cromwell – drums (4, 5, 11)
- Paul Leim – drums (9)
- Eric Darken – percussion (1–3, 6), tambourine (5)
- Carl Marsh – string arrangements (5, 9)
- Carl Gorodetzky – string contractor (5, 9)
- The Nashville String Machine – strings (5, 9)
- Chris Eaton – vocal arrangements (1, 3, 4, 6–8, 10, 11)
- Brent Bourgeois – vocal arrangements (2–5, 9, 12)

== Production ==
- Brent Bourgeois – A&R direction
- Brown Bannister – producer
- Steve Bishir – recording, mixing (1, 3, 4, 6, 8, 10, 11)
- David Thoener – mixing (2, 5, 7, 9)
- Dan Marnien – mixing (8, 12)
- Russ Long – additional engineer
- Hank Nirider – additional engineer, assistant engineer, mix assistant
- Greg Parker – mix assistant
- Cory Fite – digital editing at Wavepoint Digital (Nashville, Tennessee)
- Bob Ludwig – mastering at Gateway Mastering (Portland, Maine)
- Linda Bourne Wornell – A&R coordination
- Traci Sterling Bishir – production manager
- Beth Lee – art direction
- Chuck Hargett – design
- Michael Haber – photography
- Melissa Schleicher – hair, make-up
- Melanie Shelley – hair, make-up
- Mike Atkins – management

== Singles ==
- "Steady On" - #1
- "Saving Grace" - #1
- "When The Wind Blows" - #1
- "The Wonder Of It All" - #1
- "My God" - #1
- "The Song Is Alive" - #1

== Music videos ==
- "Steady On"
