= A Christmas Story (Point of Grace album) =

Studio album (Christmas Album) by Point of Grace
- Released: September 27, 1999
- Studio: The Sound Kitchen and Bulldog Studio (Franklin, Tennessee); Seventeen Grand Studio (Nashville, Tennessee); Abbey Road Studios (London, England); CBC Studio 12 (Montreal, Canada)
- Genre: Christian pop, holiday
- Length: 52:04
- Label: Word Records
- Producer: Brown Bannister

Point of Grace chronology
Steady On (1998)	A Christmas Story (1999)	Rarities & Remixes (2000)

Professional ratings
Review scores
Source	Rating
Allmusic	link

A Christmas Story is the fifth album and first Christmas album by Contemporary Christian group Point of Grace. It was released in 1999 by Word Records.

The album features several traditional Christmas songs arranged especially for the group, plus some original songs.

The group heavily promoted the album, appearing in various national media outlets as well as appearing on Amy Grant's Christmas Tour.

== Track listing ==
Album release
No.	Title	Writer(s)	Length
1.	"Joy to the World"		0:59
2.	"When Love Came Down"	Chris Eaton	4:05
3.	"Angels We Have Heard On High"		5:53
4.	"Let It Snow, Let It Snow, Let It Snow / Sleigh Ride"		4:10
5.	"Carol of the Bells / What Child Is This?"		4:56
6.	"O Holy Night"		5:33
7.	"How Great Our Joy"		1:20
8.	"Emmanuel, God With Us / O Come, O Come Emmanuel"	Christy Nockels, Nathan Nockels	4:58
9.	"Light of the World" (featuring Michael Tait)	Brent Bourgeois	4:27
10.	"Santa Claus Is Comin' to Town"		2:36
11.	"Jingle Bell Rock"		3:08
12.	"Coventry Carol"		2:05
13.	"One King"	Lowell Alexander, Jeff Borders, Gayla Borders	4:02
14.	"Not That Far from Bethlehem"	Alexander, J. Borders, G. Borders	3:54
Total length:			52:04

== Personnel ==
Point of Grace

- Shelley Breen – vocals
- Heather Payne – vocals
- Denise Jones – vocals
- Terry Jones – vocals

Musicians

- Chris Eaton – acoustic piano (2), arrangements (2, 3), vocal arrangements (4–7, 9, 11–13)
- Shane Keister – additional keyboards (2), acoustic piano (10, 11, 13), track arrangements (11), orchestra arrangements (11)
- Blair Masters – additional keyboards (2, 3, 9, 14)
- Brent Bourgeois – acoustic piano (3), arrangements (3), vocal arrangements (9)
- Matt Rollings – acoustic piano (8)
- Tom Hemby – electric guitar (2), acoustic guitar (14)
- Jerry McPherson – electric guitar (2, 3, 13), guitars (9–11), percussion (11)
- Gordon Kennedy – electric guitar (3)
- Rivers Rutherford – acoustic guitar (11, 14), gut-string guitar (13)
- Chris Leuzinger – electric guitar (14)
- Adam Anders – bass (2)
- Jimmie Lee Sloas – bass (3)
- Leland Sklar – bass (9–11, 13, 14)
- Paul Leim – drums (2, 9–11, 13, 14), percussion (11)
- Chris McHugh – drums (3)
- Eric Darken – percussion (2, 3, 8–11, 13)
- Skaila Kanga – harp (6)
- Sam Levine – penny whistle (2), recorder (2, 13), alto saxophone (10)
- Mark Douthit – saxophone (4, 9), alto saxophone (10)
- Jeff Coffin – baritone saxophone (10)
- Doug Moffet – tenor saxophone (10)
- Denis Solee – tenor saxophone (10)
- Ernie Collins – trombone (10)
- Chris Dunn – trombone (10)
- Barry Green – trombone (10)
- Chris McDonald – trombone (10)
- Mike Haynes – trumpet (10)
- Steve Patrick – trumpet (10)
- Richard Steffen – trumpet (10)
- George Tidwell – trumpet (10)
- Carl Marsh – arrangements (1, 5–8, 12), orchestration (2, 3, 8, 9, 14), vocal arrangements (5, 7), brass arrangements (10), rhythm track arrangements (10)
- Ronn Huff – orchestration (4), vocal arrangements (4, 10)
- Tim Davis – vocal arrangements (10)
- Gavyn Wright – concertmaster
- Philippe Dunnigan – contractor
- Mike Casteel – music copyist
- Eberhard Ramm – music copyist
- The London Session Orchestra – orchestra
- Ensemble Claude-Gervaise – medieval orchestra (7, 12)
- F.A.C.E. Treble Choir – choir (2, 7, 8)
- The Kid Connection – children choir (2, 13)
- Michael Tait – vocal soloist (9)

== Production ==
- Brent Bourgeois – A&R direction
- Brown Bannister – producer
- Steve Bishir – recording, mixing, penny whistle recording (2), harp recording (6)
- Jed Hackett – recording assistant
- Melissa Mattey – recording assistant
- Hank Nirider – recording assistant, mix assistant
- Greg Parker – recording assistant
- Andrew Dudman – penny whistle recording assistant (2), harp recording assistant (6)
- Patrick Kelly – additional engineer
- Russ Long – additional engineer
- David Schober – additional engineer
- Steve Price – London Session Orchestra recording
- Rob Healey – choir recording (2, 7, 8), medieval orchestra recording (7, 12)
- Fred Paragano – digital editing
- Alan Yashita – mastering at A&M Mastering (Hollywood, California)
- Linda Bourne Wornell – A&R coordinator
- Traci Sterling Bishir – production manager
- Chuck Hargett – art direction
- Beth Lee – art direction, design
- Michael Haber – photography
- Pauline Leonard – stylist
- Melissa Schliecher – hair, make-up
- Melanie Shelley – hair, make-up
- Mike Atkins – management
