= The Whole Truth (Point of Grace album) =

Studio album by Point of Grace
- Released: March 15, 1995
- Recorded: 1994
- Studio: The Bennett House and The Castle (Franklin, Tennessee); Uno Mas Studios (Brentwood, Tennessee); Quad Studios, OmniSound Studios and John Mayfield Sound Engineering, Inc. (Nashville, Tennessee)
- Genre: Christian pop
- Length: 44:38
- Label: Word, Epic
- Producer: Robert Sterling

Point of Grace chronology
Point of Grace (1993)	The Whole Truth (1995)	Life, Love & Other Mysteries (1996)

Singles from The Whole Truth
- 1. "The Great Divide" Released: March 1995; 2. "Dying to Reach You" Released: June 1995; 3. "Gather at the River" Released: September 1995; 4. "God Is with Us" Released: January 1996; 5. "Love Like No Other" Released: April 1996

Professional ratings
Review scores
Source	Rating
Allmusic	4/5 stars

The Whole Truth is the second album by Contemporary Christian group Point of Grace. It was released in 1995 by Word Records with selected market distribution by Epic Records.

== Background and release ==
The Whole Truth followed the group's debut album, which had produced six #1 singles. As a result, Word Records' promotion department felt intimidated by the prospect of its first single, "The Great Divide."

The lyrics of "The Great Divide," as recorded, were the result of a happy mistake: the line "There's a bridge to cross the great divide" was meant to be repeated, but a typo rendered the second instance as "There's a cross to bridge the great divide."

On December 9, 1995, the album charted on Billboard's Top Christian Albums at #8 and on the Billboard 200 at No. 132. Each of the album's five singles, released between March 1995 and April 1996 reached #1 on the Christian songs chart, continuing what would become the group's historic run of 24 consecutive #1's on the chart.

Music videos were filmed for "Dying to Reach You" and "Gather at the River."

== Track listing ==
No.	Title	Writer(s)	Length
1.	"Gather at the River"	Regie Hamm, Joel Lindsay	3:25
2.	"Without the Love of Jesus"	Robert Sterling, John Mandeville	3:49
3.	"The Great Divide"	Grant Cunningham, Matt Huesmann	4:18
4.	"Dying to Reach You"	Geoff Thurman, Michael Puryear	4:15
5.	"Love Like No Other"	Ty Lacy, Mandeville	4:13
6.	"God Is with Us"	Sterling	3:58
7.	"What's He Gonna Say About Me"	Geoff Thurman, Becky Thurman, Doyle Tallent	4:17
8.	"The Love He Has for You"	Dave Clark, Shelley Phillips	4:59
9.	"Take Me Back"	Sterling, Pete Strayer	3:55
10.	"The House That Mercy Built"	Cunningham, Huesmann	4:00
11.	"More Than Anything"	Jon Mohr, Randall Dennis	3:29

== Personnel ==
Point of Grace

- Shelley Breen – vocals
- Denise Jones – vocals
- Terry Jones – vocals
- Heather Payne – vocals

Musicians

- Pat Coil – acoustic piano (1, 4), synthesizer (4, 7, 10), Rhodes electric piano (7)
- David Hamilton – Hammond B3 organ (1, 7, 10), keyboards (3, 5, 8, 11), keyboard programming (3, 5), percussion programming (3, 5, 11), acoustic piano (9, 10)
- Dennis Patton – keyboards, synth bass and percussion programming (2, 6)
- Jerry McPherson – guitars (1)
- Tom Hemby – guitars (1–3, 5, 6, 9)
- Mark Baldwin – guitars (1, 3, 8, 11)
- Dann Huff – guitars (4, 7, 10)
- Jackie Street – bass (1, 3, 5, 8)
- Tommy Sims – bass (4, 7, 10, 11); keyboards, synth bass, drums and percussion programming (9)
- Scott Williamson – drums (1, 2, 5, 6)
- John Hammond – drums (3, 8), percussion programming (8)
- Paul Leim – drums (4, 7, 10)
- Eric Darken – percussion (4, 10, 11)
- Barry Green – trombone (5, 7)
- Chris McDonald – trombone (5, 7)
- Mike Haynes – trumpet (5, 7)
- George Tidwell – trumpet (5, 7)

Arrangements

- Robert Sterling – track arrangements (1, 4, 7, 8, 11), vocal arrangements (11)
- Scott Williamson – vocal arrangement (1, 2, 7–9)
- Dennis Patton – track arrangement (2, 6)
- David Hamilton – arrangements (3, 10), track arrangements (5)
- Cheryl Rogers – vocal arrangements (4–6)
- Geoff Thurman – track arrangements (4, 7), vocal arrangements (4, 7)
- Chris McDonald – horn arrangements (5, 7)
- Tommy Sims – track arrangements (9)
- Point of Grace – vocal arrangements (11)

== Production ==
- John Mays – executive producer
- Robert Sterling – producer
- John Jaszcz – track recording, mixing
- John Mayfield – track recording, vocal recording, overdub recording, digital editing
- Keith Compton – vocal recording, overdub recording
- Doug Sarrett – vocal recording, overdub recording
- Glen Spinner – vocal recording, overdub recording, recording assistant
- Scott Williamson – vocal recording, overdub recording
- Shawn McLean – recording assistant
- Greg Parker – recording assistant
- Aaron Swihart – recording assistant
- John Hurley – mix assistant
- Steve Hall – mastering at Future Disc (Hollywood, California)
- Holly Krig-Smith – production assistant
- Diana Barnes – art direction
- The Kuester Group – design
- Michael Haber – photography
- Mike Atkins – management for Atkins, Muse & Associates
