= Scott Krippayne =

American singer and songwriter (born 1971)

- Also known as: Scott Krippayne, Krippayne, S. Krippayne, Scott Kripayne, Scott Krippaehne, Scott Krippaene
- Born: Scott A. Krippaehne; July 23, 1971 (age 55)
- Origin: Seattle, Washington, U.S.
- Genres: Blues; CCM; pop; rock
- Instruments: Piano, guitar
- Years active: 1992–present
- Labels: Word; Spring Hill; Purple Honda; Pirk; Burning Bush
- Website: www.scottkrippayne.com

Scott Krippayne (born July 23, 1971) is an American singer and songwriter. He is better known for his contributions towards other artists, as over 150 of his songs have been recorded by others including Point of Grace, John Tesh, Avalon, Jaci Velasquez, FFH, True Vibe and Sandi Patty.

In 2007, he wrote the song "This Is My Now", which was chosen as the coronation song for the final of American Idol Season Six, and sung by the Top 2 Jordin Sparks and Blake Lewis. In 2014, Krippayne received a Daytime Emmy nomination for writing the theme music for Paw Patrol. He has also authored two books: Hugs for Teens and More Than a Story.

== Discography ==
=== Albums ===
Albums
Album	Released	Label	Remarks
What Matters	1992	Independent release	
Wild Imagination	1995	Word Records	First release on a music label
More	1997	Word Records	
Bright Star, Blue Sky	1999	Spring Hill Music	First release on Spring Hill music; the album produced three No. 1 singles
All of Me	2001	Spring Hill Music	
It Goes Like This	2003	Spring Hill Music	
Gentle Revolution	2005	Spring Hill Music/Word Entertainment Group	
Autobiography	2006	Spring Hill Music/Word Entertainment Group	Compilation album
Christmas [EP]	2006	Purple Honda Music	EP release containing seven songs
Crying for a Christmas			A song co-written by Krippayne and Jeff Peabody
Simple Worship	2008	Pirk Music	
Exalted Worship	2009	Burning Bush Communications	
Fight for Love	2012	Pirk Music	
Not So Silent Night	2012	Pirk Music	
Hymns	2013	Pirk Music	

=== Singles ===
- "In the House" (2019), with Felicia Barton for 101 Dalmatian Street
