= Tony Wood (musician) =

- Born: Tony Webster Wood; August 6, 1961 (age 64); Virginia
- Origin: Brentwood, Tennessee
- Genres: Gospel, Christian
- Occupations: Music producer, composer, songwriter, guitarist lyricist, music engineer, bassist, drummer
- Instruments: Bass, drums, vocals
- Years active: 1992–present
- Label: Word
- Website: tonywoodonline.com

Tony Webster Wood (born August 6, 1961) is an American Christian musician, presently signed as a Word Records writer, who is a producer, songwriter, composer, lyricist, bassist, and drummer of gospel music and Christian music. He has received five GMA Dove Awards for his production and songwriting.

== Early and personal life ==
Wood was born Tony Webster Wood on August 6, 1961, in Virginia, to Raymond and Charlotte Wood of Chase City, Virginia, where he has a brother, Glenn. Tony and his wife, Terri Wood, reside together in Brentwood, Tennessee. The couple has four daughters, Leslie, Meredith, Erin and Jordan.

== Music career ==
Wood's music career started around 1992, when he started composing songs. He has won five GMA Dove Awards for his songwriting and production work – one at the 38th Annual Dove Awards, two at the 42nd Annual Dove Awards, and two more at the 44th Annual Dove Awards.
