= Gaither Vocal Band discography =

- Studio albums: 678
- Live albums: 750
- Compilation albums: 10
- Video albums: 14

This is a discography for the gospel vocal group Gaither Vocal Band.

== Albums ==
Year	Album	_{US Christ Albums}	Members who performed	Record label	Record producer
1981	The New Gaither Vocal Band	—	Gaither, Steve Green, Gary McSpadden, Lee Young	Dayspring	
1983	Passin' The Faith Along	—	Gaither, Green, McSpadden, Jon Mohr	Dayspring	
1984	New Point of View	—	Gaither, McSpadden, Mohr, Larnelle Harris	Dayspring	
1986	One X 1	—	Gaither, McSpadden, Harris, Michael English	Word Nashville	Keith Thomas
1988	Wings	—	Gaither, McSpadden, English, Jim Murray	Star Song	Billy Smiley
1990	A Few Good Men	23	Gaither, English, Murray, Mark Lowry	Star Song	Larry Goss
1991	Homecoming	30	Gaither, English, Murray, Mark Lowry	Star Song	Ken Mansfield
1993	Peace of the Rock	—	Gaither, English, Lowry, Terry Franklin	Star Song	Cheryl Rogers
1993	Southern Classics	33	Gaither, English, Lowry, Terry Franklin	Benson	
1994	Testify	35	Gaither, Lowry, Buddy Mullins, Jonathan Pierce	Chapel	Keith Compton, Michael Sykes, Gaither
1995	Southern Classics: Volume II	—	Gaither, Lowry, Pierce, Guy Penrod	Chapel	
1997	Back Home in Indiana [LIVE]	21	Gaither, Lowry, Pierce, Guy Penrod	Spring Hill	
1997	Lovin' God & Lovin' Each Other	8	Gaither, Lowry, Pierce, Guy Penrod	Spring Hill	Michael Sykes, Gaither, Penrod
1998	Still the Greatest Story Ever Told	16	Gaither, Lowry, Penrod, David Phelps	Spring Hill	Michael Sykes, Gaither, Penrod
1999	God is Good	4	Gaither, Lowry, Penrod, David Phelps	Spring Hill	Michael Sykes, Guy Penrod
2000	I Do Believe	4	Gaither, Lowry, Penrod, David Phelps	Spring Hill	Sykes, Gaither, Penrod
2002	Everything Good	8	Gaither, Penrod, Phelps, Russ Taff	Springhouse	Sykes, Gaither, Penrod
2003	A Cappella	7	Gaither, Penrod, Phelps, Russ Taff	Gaither Music Group	Gaither, David Phelps
2006	Give It Away	6	Gaither, Penrod, Marshall Hall, Wes Hampton	Gaither Music Group	Tommy Sims, Gaither, Sykes, English
2007	Together [with Ernie Haase & Signature Sound]	4	Gaither, Penrod, Marshall Hall, Wes Hampton	Gaither Music Group	Larry Goss, Ernie Haase
2008	Lovin’ Life	6	Gaither, Penrod, Marshall Hall, Wes Hampton	Gaither Music Group	Marshall Hall, Wes Hampton, Penrod
2008	Christmas Gaither Vocal Band Style	13	Gaither, Penrod, Marshall Hall, Wes Hampton	Gaither Music Group	Russell Mauldin
2009	Gaither Vocal Band Reunion (Vol. 1)	1	Current and former members	Gaither Music Group	Bill Gaither
2009	Gaither Vocal Band Reunion (Vol. 2)	2	Current and former members	Gaither Music Group	Bill Gaither
2009	Reunited	3	Gaither, Hampton, English, Lowry, Phelps	Gaither Music Group	David Phelps
2010	Better Day (Live)	5	Gaither, Hampton, English, Lowry, Phelps	Gaither Music Group	Bill Gaither
2010	Greatly Blessed	2	Gaither, Hampton, English, Lowry, Phelps	Gaither Music Group	Gaither, English, Phelps
2011	I Am a Promise	10	Gaither, Hampton, English, Lowry, Phelps	Gaither Music Group	Gaither, Ben Isaacs
2012	Pure and Simple	3	Gaither, Hampton, English, Lowry, Phelps	Gaither Music Group	Gaither, Isaacs, Phelps, English
2014	Hymns	7	Gaither, Hampton, English, Lowry, Phelps	Gaither Music Group	Gaither, Isaacs, Phelps
2014	The New Edition	—	Gaither, Phelps, Hampton, Adam Crabb, Todd Suttles	Gaither Music Group	Gaither, Isaacs, Phelps
2014	Sometimes It Takes a Mountain	6	Gaither, Phelps, Hampton, Adam Crabb, Todd Suttles	Gaither Music Group	Gaither, Isaacs, Phelps
2015	Happy Rhythm	15	Gaither, Phelps, Hampton, Adam Crabb, Todd Suttles	Gaither Music Group	Gaither, Isaacs, Phelps
2016	Better Together	9	Gaither, Phelps, Hampton, Adam Crabb, Todd Suttles	Gaither Music Group	Gaither, Isaacs, Phelps
2017	We Have This Moment	4	Gaither, Hampton, Crabb, Suttles, Reggie Smith	Gaither Music Group	Gaither, Gordon Mote
2019	Good Things Take Time	12	Gaither, Hampton, Crabb, Suttles, Reggie Smith	Gaither Music Group	Gaither, Gordon Mote
2019	Reunion (Live)	7	Current and former members	Gaither Music Group	Gaither
2020	Reunited (Live)	—	Current and former members	Gaither Music Group	Gaither
2021	That's Gospel, Brother	—	Gaither, Hampton, Crabb, Suttles, Smith	Gaither Music Group	Gaither, Mote
2021	All Heaven and Nature Sing	—	Gaither, Hampton, Crabb, Suttles, Smith	Gaither Music Group	Mote
2022	Let's Just Praise the Lord	—	Gaither, Hampton, Crabb, Suttles, Smith	—	Gaither, Mote
2023	Shine: The Darker The Night, The Brighter The Light	—	Gaither, Hampton, Crabb, Suttles, Smith	—	Gaither, Mote
2024	New Star Shining	—	Gaither, Hampton, Crabb, Suttles, Smith	—	Gaither, Mote
2025	How Sweet It Is	—	Gaither, Hampton, Crabb, Suttles, Smith	—	Gaither, Mote
2025	Then Came The Morning	—	Gaither, Hampton, Crabb, Suttles, Smith	—	Gaither, Mote

=== Compilations ===
Some contain additional new material or alternate versions of the original albums.

- 1989: The Best from the Beginning (Word)
- 1994: The King is Coming (Benson)
- 1995: Can't Stop Talkin' About Him (Star Song)
- 1999: Classic Moments from the Gaither Vocal Band – Volume 1 (Benson)
- 1999: Classic Moments from the Gaither Vocal Band – Volume 2 (Benson)
- 2003: 8 Great Hits (Sparrow)
- 2004: The Best of the Gaither Vocal Band (Gaither Music Group)
- 2013: Icon (Spring House/Universal Music)
- 2015: Christmas Collection (Gaither Music Group)
- 2016: The Ultimate Playlist (Gaither Music Group) – available online only
- 2018: The Ultimate Playlist (Gaither Music Group)
- 2018: Special Anniversary Collection (Gaither Music Group)

=== Appearances on other albums ===
- 1998: The Apostle Original Soundtrack: "There Is a River"
- 1998: Faithful, The Cathedrals: "Heaven's Joy Awaits"
- 2000: 50 Years, The Happy Goodmans: "Bein' Happy", "Give Up"
- 2001: Greatest Moments with the Christ Church Choir, "When Jesus Lifts The Load”
- 2001: Encore, Old Friends Quartet: "Unbelievable Friend", "A Few Good Men"
- 2001: On Broadway, Mark Lowry: "Bein' Happy", "Let Freedom Ring", "Mary, Did You Know?"
- 2005: Ernie Haase & Signature Sound, Ernie Haase & Signature Sound: "Where No One Stands Alone, "Oh! What A Time"
- 2007: Get Away, Jordan, Ernie Haase & Signature Sound: "Search Me Lord", "Home", "He Touched Me"
- 2007: Don't Let Me Miss The Glory, Gordon Mote: "Get Up In Jesus' Name"
- 2009: Pilgrimage, Larry Gatlin and The Gatlin Brothers: "He Brought Her Back"
- 2009: Jason Crabb, Jason Crabb: "Daystar"
- 2011: The Song Lives On, Jason Crabb: "Satisfied", "Satisfied (Hallelujah I Have Found Him)", "Please Forgive Me"
- 2011: Brighter One, Marshall Hall: "I Just Feel Like Something Good Is About To Happen", ":30"
- 2012: Classic, David Phelps: "The Dream", "Swing Down Chariot", "Glorious Impossible", "You Are My All in All"
- 2013: All Things New, Gordon Mote: "Down To The River"
- 2015: Songs in the Key of Happy, Goodman Revival: "Search Me, Lord", "Sometimes It Takes A Mountain"
- 2015: Hits & Hymns, Jimmy Fortune: "Just A Closer Walk With Thee"
- 2015: The Gospel According to Gatlin, Larry Gatlin & The Gatlin Brothers: "Clean"
- 2015: Freedom, David Phelps: "When We All Get Together With The Lord", "Your Time Will Come"
- 2017: What's Not To Love?, Mark Lowry: "What's Not To Love"
- 2019: Hope Keeps Writing The Song, Jim & Melissa Brady: "You Gotta Have A Song"
- 2023: Where You Lead Me, Gordon Mote: "Door Wide Open"
- 2024: Foundations: The Hymns Of My Heart, Chris Blue: "Can't Stop Talkin' About Him", "I Can’t Even Walk (Without You Holding My Hand)"
- 2024: Loving You, The Nelons: Moses (with Joseph Hadebank)
- 2025: Every Day Is Christmas, Chris Blue: "I Pray On Christmas"

== Video ==
Year	Title	Members who performed	Certifications
1991	Homecoming	Gaither, Michael English, Jim Murray, Mark Lowry	–
1993	Live at Praise Gathering	Gaither, Michael English, Mark Lowry, Terry Franklin	–
1997	Back Home in Indiana	Gaither, Mark Lowry, Guy Penrod, Jonathan Pierce	–
1998	Hawaiian Homecoming	Gaither, Mark Lowry, Guy Penrod, David Phelps	–
2002	I Do Believe	Gaither, Mark Lowry, Guy Penrod, David Phelps	–
2003	Australian Homecoming	Gaither, Russ Taff, Guy Penrod, David Phelps	–
2006	Give It Away	Gaither, Marshall Hall, Wes Hampton, Guy Penrod	–
2007	Together	Gaither, Hall, Hampton, Penrod (with Ernie Haase & Signature Sound)	Gold
2009	Reunion Volumes 1 & 2	Former and present members	Gold
2010	Reunited	Gaither, Michael English, Wes Hampton, Mark Lowry, David Phelps	Gold
2010	Better Day	Gaither, Michael English, Wes Hampton, Mark Lowry, David Phelps	–
2013	Pure And Simple Vol. 1 & 2	Gaither, Michael English, Wes Hampton, Mark Lowry, David Phelps	–
2015	Sometimes it Takes a Mountain	Gaither, David Phelps, Wes Hampton, Adam Crabb, Todd Suttles	–
2015	Happy Rhythm	Gaither, David Phelps, Wes Hampton, Adam Crabb, Todd Suttles	–
2018	We Have This Moment	Gaither, Wes Hampton, Reggie Smith, Adam Crabb, Todd Suttles	–
2023	Shine – The Darker The Night The Brighter The Light	Gaither, Wes Hampton, Reggie Smith, Adam Crabb, Todd Suttles	–
2024	Love Songs	Gaither, Wes Hampton, Reggie Smith, Adam Crabb, Todd Suttles	–

== Homecoming video performances ==
- 1989: A Praise Gathering: "He Came Down To My Level", "Alpha and Omega", "It Took A Faith", "He Touched Me", "Daystar (Shine Down On Me)", "Joy In The Morning", "Over The Moon", "Dream On"
- 1992: A Praise Gathering: "He Touched Me", "Holy Highway"
- 1993: Old Friends: "The Old Gospel Ship"
- 1994: Landmark: "The Old Landmark"
- 1994: Precious Memories: "Had It Not Been"
- 1995: When All Of God's Singers Get Home: "I Shall Wear A Crown"
- 1995: Sunday Meetin' Time: "Home Where I Belong"
- 1996: Ryman Gospel Reunion: "You And Me Jesus" (with Jake Hess), "When Jesus Says It's Enough"
- 1996: Sing Your Blues Away: "The Old Gospel Ship"
- 1996: Homecoming Texas Style: "Yes, I Know"
- 1996: Joy To The World: "New Star Shining"
- 1996: Moments to Remember: "I'm Gonna Keep On" (with Jake Hess)
- 1997: Feelin' at Home: "Yes, I Know"
- 1998: Singin’ With The Saints: "Singing With The Saints" "I Know Where I Am Now" (with Jake Hess)
- 1998: Rivers Of Joy: "Loving God, Loving Each Other"
- 1998: Down By Tabernacle: "Tell Me" (with Janet Paschal), "The Baptism Of Jesse Taylor"
- 1998: All Day Singin' At The Dome: "Satisfied", "I Believe In A Hill Called Mt. Calvary"
- 1998: Atlanta Homecoming: "Where Could I Go", "Alpha And Omega"
- 1999: Kennedy Center Homecoming: "Promises One By One", "The Star-Spangled Banner"
- 1999: So Glad!: "Bein' Happy"
- 1999: I'll Meet You On The Mountain: "There Is A Mountain"
- 2000: Good News: "Good, Good News"
- 2000: Harmony in the Heartland: "A House Of Gold" (with Michael English)
- 2000: Memphis Homecoming: "God Is Good All The Time", "Build An Ark"
- 2000: Oh, My Glory!: "I Shall Wear A Crown", "Let Freedom Ring"
- 2000: Irish Homecoming: "Whenever We Agree Together", "Satisfied (Hallelujah I Have Found Him)", "It Is Finished"
- 2000: Whispering Hope: "Singing With The Saints", "Child, You're Forgiven"
- 2000: Christmas in the Country: "Mary Was The First One To Carry The Gospel"
- 2000: Christmas... A Time for Joy: "The Christmas Song", "Mary, Did You Know?", "The King is Coming"
- 2001: London Homecoming: "He Came Down To My Level", "The Old Rugged Cross Made The Difference"
- 2001: A Billy Graham Music Homecoming – Vol. 1: "The King Is Coming"
- 2001: A Billy Graham Music Homecoming – Vol. 2: "Because He Lives", "He Touched Me"
- 2001: Journey To The Sky: "The Love Of God"
- 2001: Passin' The Faith Along: "Passin' The Faith Along", "Born Again" (with Russ Taff)
- 2001: Freedom Band: "Loving God, Loving Each Other" (with The Oak Ridge Boys)
- 2002: New Orleans Homecoming: "On The Authority"
- 2002: God Bless America: "I'm Gonna Sing"
- 2002: Let Freedom Ring: "When We All Get Together With The Lord", "I Pledge My Allegiance", "Let Freedom Ring"
- 2003: Going Home: "Knowing You'll Be There"
- 2003: Red Rocks Homecoming: "Ridin' Down The Canyon", "It Is Finished"
- 2003: Rocky Mountain Homecoming: "That's When The Angels Rejoice", "America the Beautiful", "These Are They"
- 2003: A Gospel Bluegrass Homecoming Vol. 1: "Yes, I Know"
- 2003: A Gospel Bluegrass Homecoming Vol. 2: "Knowing You'll Be There
- 2004: Build A Bridge: "Let Freedom Ring"
- 2005: Hymns: "Satisfied (Hallelujah I Have Found Him)"
- 2005: Israel Homecoming: "Second Fiddle", "Holy Highway"
- 2005: Jerusalem Homecoming: "Can't Stop Talkin' About Him", "These Are They"
- 2006: Canadian Homecoming: "My Journey To The Sky", "Holy Highway" (with Ernie Haase & Signature Sound), "Alpha And Omega"
- 2006: Live From Toronto: "Bread Upon The Water", "I'll Tell It Wherever I Go", "Why Me", "I Bowed On My Knees" (with Michael English)
- 2006: Christmas In South Africa: "Jesus Loves Me", "Reaching", "Singing With The Saints"
- 2006: Homecoming Christmas: "Give It Away", "The Glorious Impossible", "The King Is Coming"
- 2007: Love Can Turn The World: "Love Can Turn The World", "There Is A River"
- 2007: South African Homecoming: "My Lord And I", "Little Is Much When God Is In It", "Worthy The Lamb"
- 2007: Amazing Grace: "I Then Shall Live" (with Ernie Haase & Signature Sound)
- 2008: A Campfire Homecoming: "Can't Stop Talkin' About Him", "Yes, I Know"
- 2008: Homecoming Picnic: "I Heard It First On The Radio"
- 2008: Country Bluegrass Homecoming Vol. 1: "Child Forgiven"
- 2008: Country Bluegrass Homecoming Vol. 2: "Jesus And John Wayne"
- 2009: Joy In My Heart: "Bread Upon The Water"
- 2010: Count Your Blessings: "Greatly Blessed, Highly Favored", "He Is Here"
- 2010: Giving Thanks: "You Are My All In All"
- 2011: Alaskan Homecoming: "Better Day", "Clean", "These Are They"
- 2011: Majesty: "My Lord And I", "Satisfied (Hallelujah I Have Found Him)"
- 2011: Tent Revival Homecoming: "Jesus Hold My Hand", "He's Alive"
- 2011: The Old Rugged Cross: "Greatly Blessed, Highly Favored", "That Sounds Like Home To Me"
- 2012: Gaither Homecoming Celebration! (taped in 1998): "Singing With The Saints", "Bein' Happy", "Faith Unlocks The Door/God Takes Good Care Of Me/Climbing Higher And Higher/Then I Met The Master (Medley)", "Loving God, Loving Each Other", "The King Is Coming"
- 2016: Circuit Rider: "Against The Grain" (with Mark Lowry)
- 2017: Give The World A Smile: "Working On A Building"
- 2017: Sweeter As The Days Go By: "You've Got A Friend", "We'll Talk It Over"
- 2023: Power In The Blood: "Go Ask" (with Mark Lowry), "Worthy the Lamb"
- 2023: Hallelujah Homecoming: "Journey To The Sky", "The Baptism of Jesse Taylor" (with Jason Crabb and Marshall Hall), "Give It Away" (with Mark Lowry and Marshall Hall), "Because He Lives" (with Gene McDonald)
- 2025: Heavenly Love: "Hard Trials Will Soon Be Over" (with Ernie Haase & Signature Sound, Chris Blue, Gene McDonald), "Your Grace and Mercy" (with Chris Blue)
- 2026: I Go To The Rock: "There's Something About That Name" (with Gloria Gaither)
- 2026: You Are Loved: "The King Is Coming"
