= Grammy Award for Best Southern, Country or Bluegrass Gospel Album =

Honor presented to country or gospel artists

- Awarded for: Southern gospel, country, or bluegrass gospel albums
- Country: United States
- Presented by: National Academy of Recording Arts and Sciences
- First award: 1991
- Final award: 2011
- Website: grammy.com

The Grammy Award for Best Southern, Country or Bluegrass Gospel Album was an honor presented at the Grammy Awards, a ceremony that was established in 1958 and originally called the Gramophone Awards, to artists, producers, and engineers for quality gospel music albums. Honors in several categories are presented at the ceremony annually by the National Academy of Recording Arts and Sciences (NARAS) of the United States to "honor artistic achievement, technical proficiency and overall excellence in the recording industry, without regard to album sales or chart position".

Originally called the Grammy Award for Best Southern Gospel Album, the award was first presented to Bruce Carroll at the 33rd Grammy Awards in 1991 for the album The Great Exchange. Three years later, the category's name was changed to the Best Southern Gospel, Country Gospel or Bluegrass Gospel Album. The category's name was changed to Best Southern, Country or Bluegrass Gospel Album in 1998. After 2011 it was merged with the Grammy Award for Best Rock Gospel Album and the Grammy Award for Best Pop/Contemporary Gospel Album, forming the Grammy Award for Best Contemporary Christian Music Album. The NARAS made this change in order to "tighten the number of categories" at the Grammy Awards. In 2015, a similar category, Best Roots Gospel Album was introduced.

Bill Gaither has the most wins in the category, with a total of four: two from his work in the Gaither Vocal Band, and another two in combination with his wife, Gloria. Randy Travis has won one less Grammy than Gaither in this category, with three. Gaither has the most nominations in the category, with eleven; the Light Crust Doughboys have eight, trailing Gaither by three nominations. Kyle Lehning holds the record for most wins as a producer or engineer, with a total of three. Nominated bands include Karen Peck and New River, who were selected in three of the final four years of the Grammy, and the Cathedral Quartet.

== Recipients ==
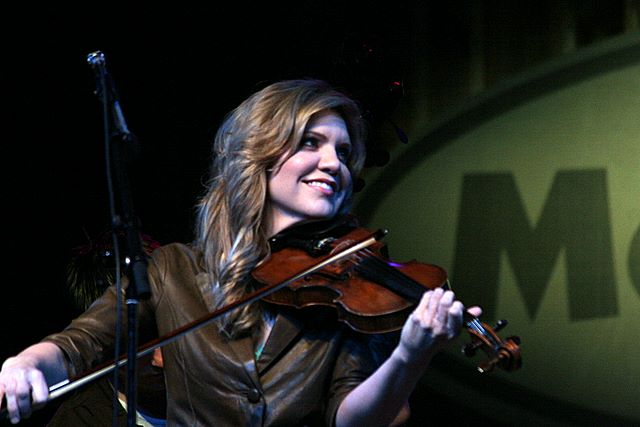
Alison Krauss won the award in 1995 along with The Cox Family

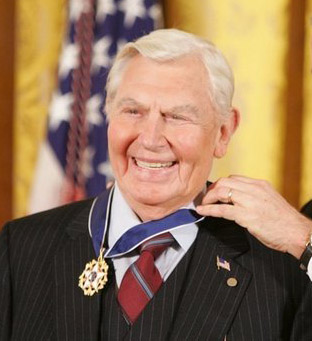
Andy Griffith won the 1997 award for I Love to Tell the Story – 25 Timeless Hymns

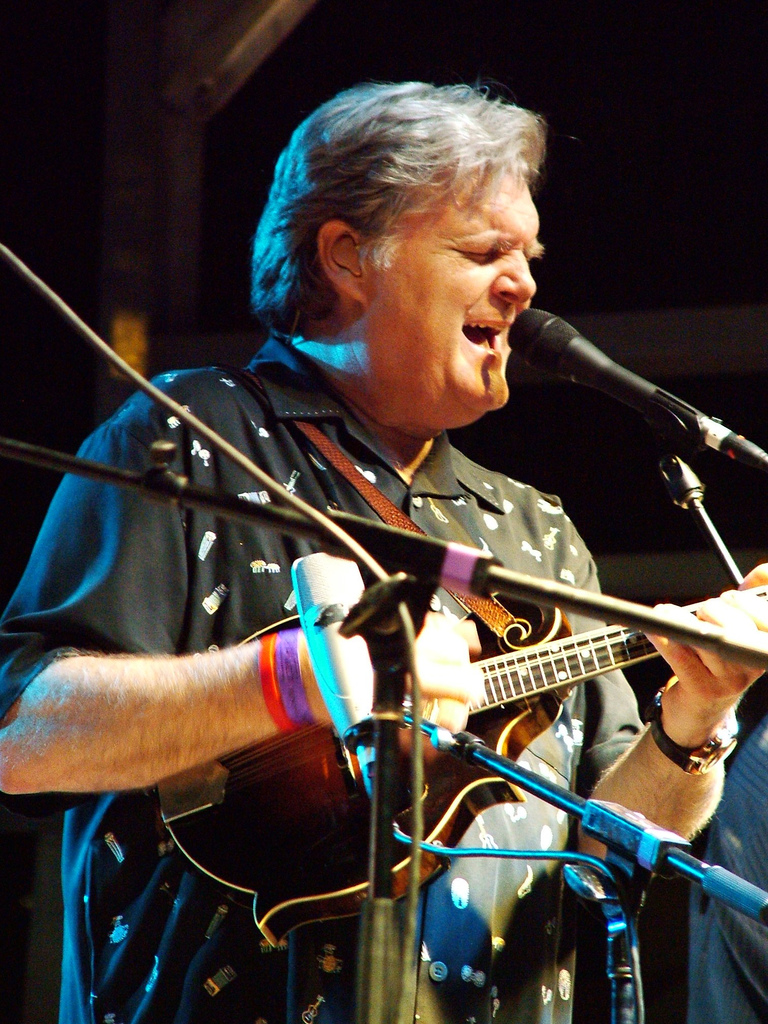
Two-time award winner Ricky Skaggs

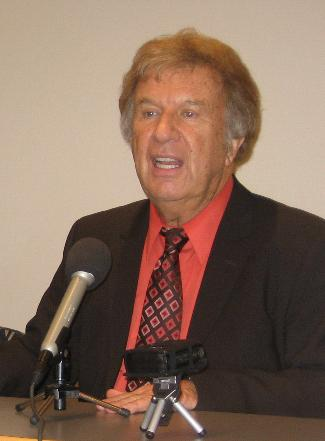
Bill Gaither has won the award four times, the most of any performer

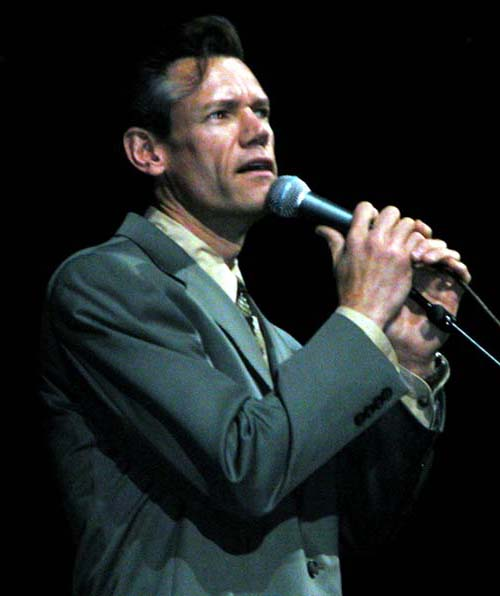
Randy Travis was awarded the Grammy three times from 2004–2007

Year^{[I]}	Winning artist	Personnel	Work	Other nominees	Ref.
1991	Bruce Carroll		The Great Exchange	Happy Goodman Family – The Reunion; The Nelons – Let the Redeemed Say So; Speer Family – He's Still in the Fire; J. D. Sumner and the Stamps – Victory Road	
1992	Gaither Vocal Band		Homecoming	The Chuck Wagon Gang – Still Rollin'; Mid-South Boys – Shoulder to Shoulder; Speer Family – Hallelujah Time; J. D. Sumner and the Stamps – Peace in the Valley; The Talleys – Love Will	
1993	Bruce Carroll		Sometimes Miracles Hide	Cathedral Quartet – Camp Meeting Live; Jeff & Sheri Easter – Pickin' the Best ... Live; Florida Boys – Live; Speer Family – 70th Anniversary Celebration	
1994	Kathy Mattea		Good News	Bruce Carroll – Walk On; Cathedral Quartet – Worship His Glory; Gaither Vocal Band – Southern Classics; Ralph Stanley – Sunday Morning	
1995	The Cox Family and Alison Krauss		I Know Who Holds Tomorrow	Cathedral Quartet – High and Lifted Up; Charlie Daniels – The Door; Wendy Bagwell and the Sunliters – Tell It Again; The Torchmen – Just Stopped By	
1996		Bill Hearn, producer	Amazing Grace – A Country Salute to Gospel	Bruce Carroll – One Summer Evening Live; Crystal Gayle – Someday; Joe Isaacs and Ralph Stanley – A Gospel Gathering; Jerry & Tammy Sullivan – At the Feet of God	
1997	Andy Griffith		I Love to Tell the Story – 25 Timeless Hymns	Charlie Daniels – Steel Witness; Doyle Lawson & Quicksilver – There's a Light Guiding Me; Bobbie Nelson and Willie Nelson – How Great Thou Art; Ricky Van Shelton – Don't Overlook Salvation	
1998		David Corlew and Peter York, producers	Amazing Grace 2: A Country Salute to Gospel	James Blackwood and the Light Crust Doughboys – Keep Lookin' Up: The Texas Swing Sessions; Gaither Vocal Band – Back Home in Indiana; The Martins – Light of the World	
1999		Peter Afterman, John Huie, and Ken Levitan, producers	The Apostle – Music from and Inspired by the Motion Picture	James Blackwood Quartet and the Light Crust Doughboys – They Gave the World a Smile: The Stamps Quartet Tribute Album; Cathedral Quartet – Faithful; Bill and Gloria Gaither and Their Homecoming Friends – Down by the Tabernacle; Andy Griffith – Just as I Am	
2000	Bill and Gloria Gaither and Their Homecoming Friends		Kennedy Center Homecoming	Glen Campbell – A Glen Campbell Christmas; Roy Clark – Roy Clark Sings & Plays Gospel Greats; Doyle Lawson & Quicksilver – Winding Through Life; J. D. Sumner and the Stamp Quartet – The Final Sessions	
2001	Ricky Skaggs, and Kentucky Thunder	Brent King and Alan Shulman, engineers	Soldier of the Cross	The Jordanaires, the Light Crust Doughboys with James Blackwood – The Great Gospel Hit Parade: From Memphis to Nashville to Texas; Cathedral Quartet – The Cathedrals: A Farewell Celebration; Doyle Lawson & Quicksilver – Just Over in Heaven; Paul Williams & The Victory Trio – Old Ways & Old Paths	
2002	Bill and Gloria Gaither and Their Homecoming Friends	Chad Evans, engineer	Bill & Gloria Gaither Present a Billy Graham Music Homecoming	Merle Haggard and Albert E. Brumley, Jr. – Two Old Friends; Ann-Margret and The Jordanaires, the Light Crust Doughboys with James Blackwood – God Is Love: The Gospel Sessions; The Oak Ridge Boys – From the Heart; Randy Travis – Inspirational Journey	
2003	The Jordanaires, Larry Ford, the Light Crust Doughboys	Tim Cooper, Chuck Ebert, Adrian Payne, Robb Tripp, and Philip York, engineers	We Called Him Mr. Gospel Music: The James Blackwood Tribute Album	Charlie Daniels Band – How Sweet the Sound: 25 Favorite Hymns and Gospel Greats; Gaither Vocal Band – Everything Good; The Oak Ridge Boys – An Inconvenient Christmas	
2004	Randy Travis	Kyle Lehning, producer. Jason Lehning and Steve Tillisch, engineers	Rise and Shine	Blue Highway – Wondrous Love; The Crabb Family – The Walk; Gaither Vocal Band – A Cappella; Engelbert Humperdinck, The Blackwood Brothers Quartet, The Jordanaires and the Light Crust Doughboys – Always Hear the Harmony: The Gospel Sessions	
2005	Randy Travis	Kyle Lehning, producer. Jason Lehning and Casey Wood, engineers	Worship & Faith	The Crabb Family – Driven; Art Greenhaw, The Jordanaires, Nokie Edwards, and the Light Crust Doughboys – 20th Century Gospel: From Hymns to Blackwood Brothers Tribute to Christian Country; Buddy Miller– Universal United House of Prayer; Various artists – Amazing Grace 3: A Country Salute to Gospel	
2006	Amy Grant	Vince Gill and Brown Bannister, producers. Steve Bishir, engineer	Rock of Ages... Hymns and Faith	The Crabb Family – Live At Brooklyn Tabernacle; Larry Gatlin & The Gatlin Brothers – Sing Their Family Gospel Favorites; The Jordanaires, Nokie Edwards, the Light Crust Doughboys, and Larry "T-Byrd" Gordon – Southern Meets Soul: An American Gospel Jubilee; The Oak Ridge Boys – Common Thread	
2007	Randy Travis	Kyle Lehning, producer. Casey Wood, engineer	Glory Train: Songs of Faith, Worship, and Praise	Kenny Bishop – Kenny Bishop; Del McCoury Band – The Promised Land; Gaither Vocal Band – Give It Away; Alan Jackson – Precious Memories	
2008	Ricky Skaggs, The Whites	Brent King, engineer	Salt of the Earth	Bill and Gloria Gaither and The Homecoming Friends – Amazing Grace; Karen Peck and New River – Journey of Joy; Billy Joe Shaver – Everybody's Brother; Kenny & Amanda Smith Band – Tell Someone; Various artists (Ed Cash producer) – I'll Fly Away: Country Hymns & Songs of Faith	
2009	Gaither Vocal Band	Chad Evans and Pete Greene, engineers	Lovin' Life	The Booth Brothers – Room for More; Charlie Louvin – Steps to Heaven; Bart Millard – Hymned Again; Karen Peck and New River – Ephesians One	
2010	Jason Crabb	Paul Corley and Ben Fowler, engineers	Jason Crabb	Ernie Haase & Signature Sound – Dream On; Tracy Lawrence – The Rock; Barry Scott & Second Wind – In God's Time; Triumphant Quartet – Everyday	
2011	Diamond Rio	Michael Clute, engineer	The Reason	Austins Bridge – Times Like These; Jeff & Sheri Easter – Expecting Good Things; Ty Herndon – Journey On; Karen Peck & New River – Live at Oak Tree: Karen Peck & New River	

^{^[I]} Each year is linked to the article about the Grammy Awards held that year.
