= Greatly Blessed =

Studio album by Gaither Vocal Band
- Released: August 10, 2010
- Genre: CCM, Southern Gospel
- Label: Spring Hill Music Group

Gaither Vocal Band chronology
Better Day (2009)	Greatly Blessed (2010)

Professional ratings
Review scores
Source	Rating
AllMusic	3/5 stars

Greatly Blessed is an album from Contemporary Christian, Southern Gospel group Gaither Vocal Band. The album was released on August 10, 2010.

== Track listing ==
1. "Better Day" (Connie Harrington, Steven Jones) - 3:54
2. "When He Blest My Soul" (J.R. Baxter, Cleavant Derricks) - 3:11
3. "Love Like I'm Leavin'" (Lowell Alexander, Benjamin Gaither, Jeff Silvey) - 3:36
4. "You Are My All in All" (Dennis Jernigan) - 5:14
5. "Please Forgive Me" (Gerald Crabb) - 3:58
6. "Greatly Blessed, Highly Favored" (William J. Gaither, Larry Gatlin) - 2:57
7. "He Is Here" (Kirk Talley) - 6:38
8. "Ain't Nobody" (Benjamin Gaither, Jeff Silvey) - 3:35
9. "Clean" (William J. Gaither, Larry Gatlin) - 4:29
10. "Muddy Water" (Roger Brown, Benjamin Gaither, Jeff Silvey) - 3:55
11. "I Know How to Say Thank You" (Barry Jennings, Suzanne Jennings) - 4:34
12. "That Sounds Like Home To Me" (Eddie Crook, Charles Aaron Wilburn) - 4:52
13. "He's Alive" (Don Francisco) - 5:11

== Band members ==
- David Phelps - Tenor
- Wes Hampton - Tenor
- Michael English - Lead
- Mark Lowry - Baritone
- Bill Gaither - Bass

== Awards ==
At the 42nd GMA Dove Awards, Greatly Blessed won two Dove Awards: Southern Gospel Album of the Year and Southern Gospel Recorded Song of the Year for the song "Better Day". The group was also nominated for Group of the Year.

== Chart performance ==
The album peaked at #53 on Billboard 200 and #2 on Billboard's Christian Albums, where it spent 23 weeks.
