= Marshall Hall (singer) =

American singer

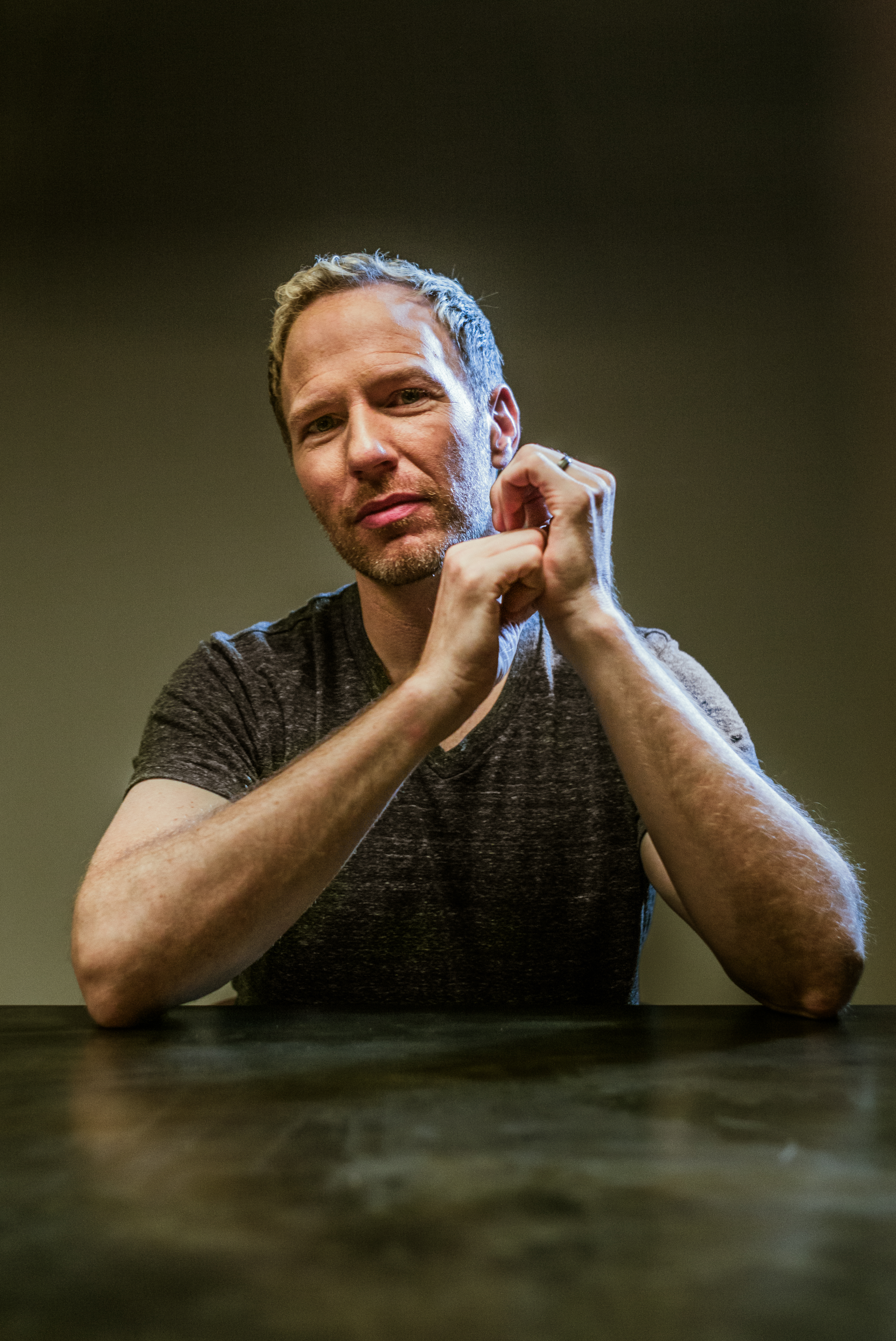
- Hall - Chicago (2015)

Background information
- Born: Marshall Kip Hall; December 30, 1970 (age 54); Lexington, Kentucky, US
- Origin: United States
- Genres: Gospel; Contemporary Christian music
- Occupation: Worship leader
- Instruments: Vocals; piano; guitar
- Years active: 1992–present
- Website: marshallhallmusic.com

Marshall Hall (born December 30, 1970) is an American singer, songwriter, and producer. He is best known for his time as a member of the Gaither Vocal Band, his appearances on the Bill Gaither Homecoming tours, and Gaither Homecoming video series.

== Early life ==
Hall was born in Lexington, Kentucky, to a musical family: mother Alice, father Dale, older brother Mitchell, and younger brother Matthew. His mother played piano at church, and dad was a singer. The family's life was centered on the church and their faith. When Hall reached high school in 1985, he joined the church youth group and attended the state youth convention. At the age of 14, he made a decision to follow Christ. After high school, Hall followed in his father's footsteps and attended Anderson University in Anderson, Indiana. While singing at his church in Anderson, Hall was approached by a local producer and asked to sing for a project at Gaither Studios. A year after graduating from college, he quit his job at a furniture store and began working as a studio singer full-time.

== Career ==
As a session vocalist, Hall has sung background vocals on records and jingles for several national clients, including McDonald's, Disney, and Warner Bros. During one session for Bill Gaither, Hall was asked to join the Homecoming artists in Memphis, Tennessee, for a video taping. Subsequent videos followed for Hall, including tapings in Indianapolis and New York City at Carnegie Hall.

He also found a spot as a back-up singer on projects for recording artists John Tesh, Clay Walker, Carman, and others. He has written songs for several Gaither videos, as well as for Salvador, Point of Grace, fellow Gaither Vocal Band member David Phelps and the Vocal Band. In 2003, he released a solo studio album, Wisdom of Fools, which included two songs that were used by Point of Grace in their album I Choose You and Boundless in 2005 which included the old song from his former group.

Hall joined the Gaither Vocal Band as the new baritone in early 2004 after an invitation from Bill Gaither that led to a one and a half month audition. He was a part of three of the Vocal Band's studio albums including Give It Away, Lovin' Life, and Christmas Gaither Vocal Band Style. Hall was on the road with the Gaither Vocal Band until 2009, when he left the group to pursue a solo career and ministry work. Since 2009, Hall has re-joined the GVB to fill in as lead (2010, when Michael English recovered from back surgery) and baritone (2013, when Mark Lowry broke his femur).

In September 2012, he began serving as worship leader at Shadow Mountain Community Church in El Cajon, California, where David Jeremiah serves as senior pastor. In 2014, Hall moved to the Chicago area and served as a worship leader at Willow Creek Community Church. In September, 2019, Hall became the worship pastor at Northland Church in Longwood, Florida.

== Personal life ==
Hall married Lori Vick in April 2003, and the couple has three daughters Presley, Reese and Sela.

== Awards ==
=== Grammy Awards ===
Year	Category	Nominated work	Result
2007	Southern Gospel, Country Gospel, or Bluegrass Gospel Album	Give It Away (with the Gaither Vocal Band)	Nominated
2009	Southern Gospel, Country Gospel, or Bluegrass Gospel Album	Lovin' Life (with the Gaither Vocal Band)	Won

=== GMA Dove Awards ===
Year	Category	Nominated work	Result
2005	Southern Gospel Recorded Song of the Year	"A Picture Of Grace" (with the Gaither Vocal Band)	Nominated
2007	Southern Gospel Album	Give It Away (with the Gaither Vocal Band)	Won
2007	Southern Gospel Recorded Song of the Year	"Give It Away" (with the Gaither Vocal Band)	Won
2009	Southern Gospel Album	Lovin' Life (with the Gaither Vocal Band)	Won
2009	Christmas Album	Christmas Gaither Vocal Band Style (with the Gaither Vocal Band)	Nominated
2010	Country Album	Brighter One	Nominated
2011	Recorded Country Song of the Year	"There Is Nothing Greater Than Grace"	Won
