= Reunited (Gaither Vocal Band album) =

Studio album by Gaither Vocal Band
- Released: September 8, 2009
- Genre: Southern gospel
- Label: Spring Hill Music Group
- Producer: David Phelps, Bill Gaither

Gaither Vocal Band chronology
Christmas Gaither Vocal Band Style (2008)	Reunited (2009)	Better Day (2010)

Professional ratings
Review scores
Source	Rating
AllMusic	(?)

Reunited is an album from contemporary Christian, southern gospel group Gaither Vocal Band. The album was released on September 8, 2009. The album reunites Bill Gaither with singers David Phelps, Wes Hampton, Michael English, and Mark Lowry.

== Track listing ==
1. "I Believe In A Hill Called Mount Calvary" – 3:26
2. "It Is Finished" – 5:46
3. "Loving God, Loving Each Other" – 5:28
4. "He Touched Me" – 3:11
5. "Because He Lives" – 3:36
6. "I'm Free" – 3:30
7. "I Am Loved" – 5:16
8. "The King Is Coming" – 5:15
9. "Sinner Saved By Grace" – 5:32
10. "Worthy The Lamb" – 5:06
11. "The Church Triumphant" – 5:23
12. "These Are They" – 5:07
13. "There's Something About That Name" (Live version) – 4:17

== DVD track listing ==
1. "Alpha And Omega"
2. "At The Cross"
3. "The Love Of God"
4. "When He Blest My Soul"
5. "Journey To The Sky"
6. "Nessun Dorma"
7. "Not Gonna Worry"
8. "Dueling Pianos Medley" (featuring Gordon Mote, Christopher Phillips)
9. "He Touched Me"
10. "The Three Bells" (featuring The Isaacs, Bill Gaither)
11. "I Will Praise Him" (featuring The Isaacs)
12. "There’s Something About That Name" (narrative by Gloria Gaither)
13. "Lord, Feed Your Children"
14. "Mary, Did You Know?"
15. "Worthy The Lamb"

== Awards ==
At the 41st GMA Dove Awards, Reunited won a Dove Award for Southern Gospel Album of the Year. Also, the song "Because He Lives" was nominated for Southern Gospel Recorded Song of the Year.

== Chart performance ==
The album peaked at No. 67 on Billboard 200 and No. 3 on Billboard's Christian Albums. It spent 45 weeks on the charts.
