= Terry and Barbi Franklin =

American contemporary Christian music duo

Terry and Barbi Franklin are American singers and songwriters of contemporary inspirational Christian music. Together, they have written numerous popular Christian songs. They have been ministering together in a music and speaking ministry since 1985 called "Love Sings! Ministries" (formerly known as "Heart for the World").

== Early life ==
Terry Franklin was born in Miami, FL in 1957 to Bob and Sandra Franklin. Bob was a member of The Suntones, a barbershop quartet that performed on The Jackie Gleason Show from 1964 to 1970. For two years, while still traveling in music ministry with Barbi, Terry performed as part of the Gaither Vocal Band (1992 to 1994). Together, they opened for some of the Gaither concerts and sang at all the Praise Gatherings, Jubilates, and Family Fests during the 2 years.

Barbi Franklin was born Barbi Murk in Chicago, IL in 1959 to Dr. Jim and Donna Murk. She sang and played violin as part of the Murk Family Musicale, a family singing ministry composed of her parents and 5 siblings that began traveling in full-time music ministry in 1963 until after each of the kids were married. They recorded more than 20 albums together, giving more than 5,000 programs across 25 nations from 1963 to 1988. The group got its start after Jim won the national championship of the Original Amateur Hour (hosted by Ted Mack) in 1963.

== Early ministry ==
Terry & Barbi met in 1980 on "Prayer Day" when they were both students at Moody Bible Institute in Chicago, IL. They married in 1983, and launched into music ministry as singer-songwriters in 1985. That same year, they signed a recording contract with City Alive Records in Chicago, (affiliated with WCFC-TV 38 in Chicago). They produced their first television special Time for Joy in 1985, and have traveled in missions to 40 nations worldwide. In 1988, they moved to Nashville, Tennessee, and they wrote their first original song recorded by another artist, "No Wonder," that was well received on radio charts nationwide. Through the years, the Franklins have worked with many respected and acclaimed Christian leaders and prominent musicians, the late Billy Graham, and the late Dr Adrian Rogers, Dr. Jack Hayford, Jim Cymbala and The Brooklyn Tabernacle Choir, Focus on the Family, Family Research Council, Bill & Gloria Gaither, Don & Tim Wildmon of American Family Association, and many more.

From 1992 to 1994, while still singing with Barbi, Terry sang tenor with the Gaither Vocal Band for two years during the group's transition. He sang on two of their albums: Peace of the Rock and Southern Classics, both released in 1993. The title song of Peace of the Rock reached # 1 on the CCM Adult Contemporary chart in May 1993, where it remained for two weeks.

Southern Classics won a Dove Award for "Southern Gospel Album" in 1994. Two songs from the album won Dove Awards for "Southern Gospel Recorded Song": "Satisfied" in 1994 and "I Bowed on my Knees" in 1995. A remix of the song "There Is a River" from the album (featuring Terry on lead vocal) was included on the soundtrack album for the movie The Apostle in 1998. That album won a Grammy Award for "Best Southern, Country, or Bluegrass Gospel Album" in 1998.

== Songwriting ==
Terry and Barbi have written many songs revolving around their themes of prayer, revival, and family. And some of their most well-known songs have been recorded by choral, inspirational, and Southern Gospel Groups. Their most noted songs are "Out of His Great Love," "Calvary Came Through," "God of All Gods," and "For God So Loved."

"Out of His Great Love" was originally recorded by The Martins on their eponymous debut album in 1995. The song reached # 3 on the Singing News Radio Chart the same year. It won the Dove Award for "Southern Gospel Recorded Song" in 1996.

"Calvary Came Through" was originally recorded by Gold City on their Renewed album in 1994. The song reached #8 on the Singing News Southern Gospel chart at the end of the year. It was nominated for a Dove Award ("Southern Gospel Recorded Song") in 1995, but lost to "I Bowed on my Knees." The song was later recorded by the Brooklyn Tabernacle Choir (along with the Franklin's composition "God Of all Gods") on their album Favorite Song of All in 1996. Terry and Barbi also recorded these two songs on their Go the Distance and Songs of Worship & Revival albums.

"For God So Loved" was originally recorded by Brian Free and Assurance on their album 4 God So Loved in 1996. The song reached # 1 on the Singing News Radio Chart in December 1997. It won the Southern Gospel Music Association Award for "Song of the Year" in 1998. Terry & Barbi finally recorded it themselves on their "Awaken Us" album released in 2014 with 2 other songs arranged and produced with full live choir and orchestra by the late Lari Goss - the title cut, "Awaken Us," and "Any Crown I Receive" (which they sang at Barbi's mom's memorial in February 2012). Twelve of their albums are still available online.

== Worship & family ministry ==
Terry and Barbi have traveled full-time in worship & family ministry since 1985, ministering across the United States and in 40 nations worldwide so far. In 2017 their non-profit ministry name was changed from Heart for the World to Love Sings! Ministries. Besides their family worship events, they also lead marriage retreats, and worship and prayer conferences. Their two sons also traveled and sang a capella songs with them, as well as original contemporary Christian music. In 2009, they recorded one family music CD, The Franklins, that all four of them contributed to with singing, songwriting, producing, and playing instruments.

Besides their ongoing worldwide ministry, they also founded a ministry in Tennessee in 2011 called "Worship City," which they have seen blossom as they have gathered worship and prayer leaders to seek God in prayer together across their city, state, and region. Their 2018 Let Your Glory Fall worship and prayer conference featured special guest Jason Hershey, founder of David's Tent DC, and testimonies from 25+ leaders across Tennessee and 4 other surrounding states in their region. They secured the registered trademark for "Worship City" and have held many events locally and nationally, along with a tent ministry that their Worship City leaders have founded, David's Tent Tennessee. Worship City's theme is "Changing our City to Change the World through Fasting, Prayer, and Worship."

Terry and Barbi's worldwide ministry, Love Sings, has always included Family Worship Events and Marriage Retreats. But in recent years, since seeing revival firsthand around the world, they began leading prayer and worship conferences as well. Their ongoing theme worldwide has always been "Inspiring Love in the Home & Revival in the Church." In 2011, they called fellow Christians to a prayer and fasting observance in the U.S. called "Awaken Us: 40 Days to Fast and Pray." American Family Radio Network partnered with them to reach the nation, penetrating 40 states, with 500 churches and 30,000 people joining their efforts. They recruited 8 Christian leaders from a variety of denominations nationwide, unifying Christians across the U.S. for fasting and prayer, November 21 – December 31, during the last 40 days of 2011.

Terry and Barbi have also secured the trademark name "Love Sings", and have plans to record a marriage seminar with that title for American Family Association in 2018 that will be produced and distributed nationwide.

== Personal life ==
Terry and Barbi live in Nashville, Tennessee and have two grown children.

== Discography ==
=== Albums ===
- New Beginnings (1983)
- Terry & Barbi (1985)
- Shoulder to Shoulder (1988)
- Your Love Makes Me Sing (1992)
- Go the Distance (1996)
- El Calvario Triunfo (1997) (Spanish)
- Songs Of Worship and Revival, Vol. 1 (1998)
- Legacy (2001)
- Nicky and Friends, Vol. 2 (2001) (Children's album)
- Songs of Love and Marriage (2006)
- Violin Worship (2008)
- The Franklins (2009)
- Awaken Us (2014)
- Violin Worship, Vol. 2 (2014)
