= Michael English (album) =

Studio album by Michael English
- Released: 1991
- Studio: The Dugout, OmniSound Studios, Quad Studios, MasterMix and Back Stage Studios (Nashville, Tennessee); Kaleidoscope Sound (Bellevue, Tennessee); East Side Sound (New York City, New York)
- Genre: CCM
- Length: 43:31
- Label: Curb Records
- Producer: Brown Bannister

Michael English chronology
Michael English (1991)	Hope (1993)

Michael English is the debut album for Contemporary Christian artist Michael English. It was released in 1991.

At the 23rd GMA Dove Awards, Michael English won "New Artist of the Year" and "Male Vocalist of the Year" due to the album.

== Track listing ==
No.	Title	Writer(s)	Length
1.	"Solid as the Rock"	Larry Bryant, Geoff Thurmann	4:18
2.	"Mary, Did You Know?"	Buddy Greene, Mark Lowry	3:38
3.	"Do You Believe in Love"	Chris Eaton	4:15
4.	"In Christ Alone"	Shawn Craig, Don Koch	3:59
5.	"Take the Time"	Michael English, Becky Thurman, Geoff Thurman	5:01
6.	"Start a Party"	Becky Thurman, Geoff Thurman	3:52
7.	"Let's Build a Bridge"	Bob Farrell, Billy Simon, Tommy Sims	3:48
8.	"His Heart Is Big Enough"	Dawn Thomas Yarbrough	4:48
9.	"Love Won't Leave You (Out in the Rain)"	Wayne Kirkpatrick, Tommy Sims	4:55
10.	"Heaven"	Michael English, Bob Farrell, Tommy Sims, Dawn Thomas Yarbrough	5:06

== Personnel ==
- Michael English – vocals
- Shane Keister – keyboards (1, 3, 4), Hammond B3 organ (5), acoustic piano (9)
- Blair Masters – keyboards (1, 2, 4, 6), drum programming (2, 6), arrangements (2, 6), additional keyboards (3, 8, 9), Hammond B3 organ (10)
- Dann Huff – guitars (1, 3–5, 9)
- Tom Hemby – guitars (2, 3, 5, 6, 9)
- Tommy Sims – bass (1, 3, 9), keyboards (7–10), guitars (7), drum programming (7, 8, 10), arrangements (7, 8, 10), backing vocals (9, 10)
- Jackie Street – fretless bass (2)
- Mike Brignardello – bass (4, 5)
- Paul Leim – drums (1, 3–5, 9)
- Eric Darken – percussion (3, 8), tambourine (9)
- Mark Douthit – saxophones (1, 5, 6)
- Marty Paoletta – saxophone (10)
- Barry Green – trombone (1, 5, 6)
- Mike Haynes – trumpet (1, 5, 6)
- Mike Morris – horn arrangements (1, 5, 6)
- Brown Bannister – arrangements (2)
- Chris Harris – backing vocals (1, 3)
- Donna McElroy – backing vocals (1, 6)
- Chris Rodriguez – backing vocals (1, 6, 9, 10)
- Wayne Kirkpatrick – backing vocals (3)
- Mark Heimmerman – backing vocals (3, 6)
- Wayburn Dean – backing vocals (5, 7)
- George Pendergrass – backing vocals (5, 7)
- The Brooklyn Tabernacle Choir – backing vocals (7, 10)
- Kim Fleming – backing vocals (9, 10)
- Vicki Hampton – backing vocals (9, 10)

== Production ==
- Neal Joseph – executive producer
- Brown Bannister – producer, overdub engineer
- Jeff Balding – track recording
- Bill Deaton – track recording, overdub engineer, mixing (1–4)
- Billy Whittington – track recording, overdub engineer, mixing (5–10)
- Steve Bishir – overdub engineer
- Dan Rudin – overdub engineer
- Greg Parker – assistant engineer
- Carry Summers – assistant engineer
- Craig White – assistant engineer
- Doug Sax – mastering at The Mastering Lab (Hollywood, California)
- Traci Sterling – production coordinator
- Bill Brunt – art direction, design
- Laura LiPuma Nash – art direction
- Mark Tucker – photography
- Breon Reynolds – make-up
- Norman Miller at Proper Management – management
