= A Cappella (Gaither Vocal Band album) =

Studio album by Gaither Vocal Band
- Released: September 30, 2003
- Genre: CCM, Southern gospel
- Label: Spring Hill Music Group

Gaither Vocal Band chronology
Everything Good (2002)	A Cappella (2003)	Give It Away (2006)

A Cappella is an album from Contemporary Christian, Southern gospel group Gaither Vocal Band. The album was released on September 30, 2003.

== Track listing ==
1. "Low Down the Chariot" (Bill Gaither, Russ Taff) – 2:52
2. "Leave It There" / "What a Friend We Have in Jesus" (C. C. Converse, Joseph Scriven, Charles Albert Tindley) – 4:27
3. "When I Survey the Wondrous Cross" (Isaac Watts) – 3:24
4. "Delivered from the Hands of Pharaoh" (O. A. Parris, Eugene Wright) – 2:27
5. "He Will Carry You" (Scott Wesley Brown) – 4:45
6. "Jesus! What a Friend for Sinners" (John Wilbur Chapman, Rowland Prichard) – 4:17
7. "Sing a Song"/"I'd Like to Teach the World to Sing (In Perfect Harmony)" (Bill Backer, Roger Cook, Billy Davis, Roger Greenaway, Joe Raposo) – 3:41
8. "Center of My Joy" (Bill Gaither, Gloria Gaither, Richard Smallwood) – 4:24
9. "Heaven's Joy Awaits" (V. B. Ellis) – 2:38
10. "God Bless America" (Irving Berlin) – 3:28
11. "I Then Shall Live" (Gloria Gaither, Jean Sibelius) – 5:13
12. "Gentle Shepherd" (Gloria Gaither, Bill Gaither) – 4:11

== Awards ==
On 2004, A Cappella was nominated for two Dove Awards: Southern Gospel Album of the Year and Southern Gospel Recorded Song of the Year for "Gentle Shepherd", at the 35th GMA Dove Awards.

== Chart performance ==
The album peaked at #174 on the Billboard 200 and #7 on Billboard's Christian Albums.
