= Christmas Gaither Vocal Band Style =

Studio album by Gaither Vocal Band
- Released: September 30, 2008
- Genre: CCM, Christmas music
- Label: Gaither Music Group

Gaither Vocal Band chronology
| Lovin' Life (2008) | Christmas Gaither Vocal Band Style (2008) | Gaither Vocal Band Reunion (2009) |

Professional ratings
Review scores
| Source | Rating |
|---|---|
| Allmusic | (?) |

Christmas Gaither Vocal Band Style is a Christmas album released by gospel group Gaither Vocal Band on September 30, 2008.

== Track listing ==
| No. | Title | Length |
|---|---|---|
| 1. | "Winter Wonderland" | 3:09 |
| 2. | "O Little Town of Bethlehem" | 3:10 |
| 3. | "I'll Be Home for Christmas" | 3:39 |
| 4. | "O Holy Night" | 4:57 |
| 5. | "I Heard the Bells on Christmas Day" | 3:11 |
| 6. | "Christmas in the Country" | 4:08 |
| 7. | "White Christmas" | 4:25 |
| 8. | "Medley: Silent Night/Angels We Have Heard on High/How Great Our Jesus" | 3:28 |
| 9. | "My Heart Would Be Your Bethlehem" | 4:15 |
| 10. | "Come and See What's Happening" | 4:04 |
| 11. | "Away in a Manger" | 3:11 |

== Awards ==
Christmas Gaither Vocal Band Style was nominated for a Dove Award for Christmas Album of the Year at the 40th GMA Dove Awards.

== Chart performance ==
The album peaked at number 13 on Billboard's Christian Albums and number 8 on Holiday Albums.
