= Give It Away (Gaither Vocal Band album) =

Studio album by Gaither Vocal Band
- Released: January 24, 2006
- Genre: CCM, Southern Gospel
- Label: Spring Hill Music Group

Gaither Vocal Band chronology
| A Cappella (2003) | Give It Away (2006) | Together (2007) |

Professional ratings
Review scores
| Source | Rating |
|---|---|
| Allmusic | link |

Give It Away is an album from Contemporary Christian, Southern Gospel group Gaither Vocal Band. The album was released on January 24, 2006.

== Track listing ==
1. "Bread Upon the Water" (Bill Grein, Janny Grein) – 4:04
2. "I Catch 'Em, God Cleans 'Em" (Benjamin Gaither, Jeff Silvey, Kim Williams) – 3:02
3. "Jesus Loves Me" – 3:47
4. "I'll Tell It Wherever I Go" (Thomas A. Dorsey) – 3:22
5. "My Journey to the Sky" (Dorothy Austin) – 2:36
6. "Through" (Gloria Gaither, Bill Gaither, Mike Sykes) – 3:40
7. "Glorious Impossible" (Joe Beck, Carl Cartee, Wendy Wills) – 4:57
8. "Worthy the Lamb" (Bill Gaither, Gloria Gaither) – 5:05
9. "Eagle Song" (Russ Taff, Tori Taff) – 3:06
10. "Love Can Turn the World" (Benjamin Gaither, Jeff Silvey, Kim Williams) – 4:10
11. "You're Looking at a Child Forgiven" (Bill Gaither, Suzanne Jennings) – 3:23
12. "Why Me?" (Kris Kristofferson) – 4:01
13. "I Will Go On" (Gloria Gaither, Bill Gaither) – 4:31
14. "Place Called Hope" (Gloria Gaither, Bill Gaither, Jeff Silvey) – 4:25
15. "Give It Away" (Benjamin Gaither, Gloria Gaither) – 5:09

== DVD ==
1. "Bread Upon The Water"
2. "I Catch 'Em, God Cleans 'Em"
3. "Jesus Loves Me"
4. "I'll Tell It Wherever I Go" – Bill Gaither talks with Gordon Stoker
5. "My Journey To The Sky" – Bill Gaither talks with Gordon and Kimberly Mote, "Java Jive" featuring the Gaither Vocal Band, Vocal Band members introduce their spouses
6. "The Old Gospel Ship" – featuring Gordon Mote
7. "If They Could See You Through My Eyes" – featuring Gordon Mote
8. "Through"
9. "Glorious Impossible"
10. "Worthy The Lamb"
11. "Eagle Song" – The Star Spangled Banner featuring the Gaither Vocal Band
12. "Back Home Again In Indiana" – featuring Voices of Lee, Bill Gaither talks with songwriters Kim Williams and Benjy Gaither
13. "Love Can Turn The World" – featuring the Gaither Vocal Band, African Children's Choir
14. "Glory, Glory Clear The Road" – featuring Ernie Haase & Signature Sound
15. "The Heavenly Parade" – featuring Ernie Haase & Signature Sound
16. "Child Forgiven"
17. "I Will Go On"
18. "Down From His Glory" – featuring Larry Wayne Morbitt
19. "Place Called Hope"
20. "Give It Away" – featuring the Gaither Vocal Band, Ernie Haase & Signature Sound

== Awards ==
Give It Away was nominated for a Grammy Award at the 49th Grammy Awards for Best Southern, Country, Or Bluegrass Gospel Album. At the 38th GMA Dove Awards, both the album Give It Away and its title song won Dove Awards for Southern Gospel Album of the Year and Southern Gospel Recorded Song of the Year. It was also nominated for Long Form Music Video of the Year.

== Chart performance ==
The album peaked at #129 on the Billboard 200 and #6 on Billboard's Christian Albums where it remained for 40 weeks.
