= The Martins =

Christian music vocal trio

- Origin: Arkansas
- Genres: Inspirational, southern gospel, contemporary Christian
- Years active: 1990–2003, 2010-present
- Label: Spring Hill
- Members: Joyce Martin Sanders; Jonathan Martin; Judy Martin Hess
- Past members: Paul Lancaster
- Website: www.martinsonline.com

The Martins are a Christian music vocal trio composed of three siblings: Joyce Martin Sanders, Jonathan Martin, and Judy Martin Hess.

== Music career ==
They were discovered by Michael English and Mark Lowry with Bill Gaither at the 1987 National Quartet Convention mid-day booth cleanup. The kids, then ages 15, 16, and 17 were singing a capella in an empty civic center after being rejected by a local record company who told them to go back home and forget about trying to make it in "the business."

Following a weekend visit to their hometown by producer Eddie Howard, they signed with Mark Five Records who launched their first album release in 1990, From Arkansas With Love, produced by Howard. The album quickly ran up the gospel charts. In 1990, a second album release sealed their position in gospel music and their contract was sold to Springhill Records, which would take them to an all-new level of marketing.

Originally from Hamburg, Arkansas, near the Louisiana border in Ashley County, the vocalists grew up firmly and proudly planted in the Southern gospel tradition, so it is not surprising that, as they have matured, a broad range of influences have entered their musical mix. Billboard magazine describes The Martins as "breaking down walls and blurring the lines that separate Southern gospel from inspirational, adult contemporary, and other popular Christian music formats."

Rather than resting in a single niche among the numerous Christian music genres, the Martins have rummaged freely through a stack of style books, grabbing whatever interests them. Sometimes the different elements are unaltered and traditional, but more often they are tossed into the trio's musical blender so that a new mixture emerges. The result has been labeled simply as Martin Music.

Their portfolio of songs includes every musical palate, ranging from innovative and refashioned hymn arrangements to contemporary songs of praise and worship. While their eclectic style draws from a variety of musical genres, the Martins are often framed and presented as a cultural phenomenon rooted in the rural Southern United States, specifically in Arkansas.

The Martins’ "big break" came in 1992 when Michael English and Mark Lowry insisted that Gloria Gaither listen to the group audition in the women's restroom prior to a Gaither Homecoming video recording in Indiana. Gloria told Bill that he had to let them sing in the video. They have gone on to appear in over two dozen Homecoming videos. The group has also recorded over a dozen albums.

In 2002, Jonathan left the group in order to spend more time with his family. Joyce and Judy then enlisted the help of Paul Lancaster, formerly with Mullins & Co., and The Nelons. In 2003, they recorded Above It All. (Which included their most popular and well-known mega-hit “The Promise”). Between 2003 and 2010, they were somewhat inactive as a group in order to spend more time with their own families, although they did reunite for concerts periodically. During this time, the three each recorded a solo album.

They often appear on the Gaither Homecoming concert tours, as well as in limited trio appearances.

== Personal lives ==
Joyce Martin Sanders (b. January 6, 1968) lives in Nashville, Tennessee with her husband Paul, and she has two children.

Jonathan Martin (b. May 19, 1970) lives in Clive, Iowa with his wife Dara Makohoniuk-Martin and their youngest three of six children, including twin boys, one of which has cerebral palsy.

Judy Martin Hess (b. May 3, 1971) lives in Columbus, Georgia with her husband Jake Hess Jr. and their four children.

== Discography ==
=== Albums ===
- 1994: The Martins (Chordant)
- 1995: Live In His Presence (Chordant)
- 1996: An A Cappella Hymns Collection (Spring Hill)
- 1996: Wherever You Are (Spring Hill)
- 1997: Light Of The World (Spring Hill)
- 1998: Dream Big (Spring Hill)
- 2000: Windows (Spring Hill)
- 2001: Glorify Edify Testify (Spring Hill)
- 2003: Above It All (Spring Hill)
- 2005: Decade (Spring Hill)
- 2011: New Day (Spring Hill, GGS)
- 2011: The Best of The Martins (GGS)
- 2014: A Cappella (Spring Hill, GGS)
- 2018: Still Standing (Gaither Music Group)
- 2024: Ring The Bells (Spring Hill, GGS)
- 2025: This Is The Time I Must Sing (Spring Hill, GGS)

=== Appearances on other albums ===
- 1998, Grateful Hearts, Various Artists: "Calling All Hearts"
- 2002: I Do Believe, Gaither Vocal Band: Because God's Good"
- 2013: Some People Change, Michael English: "On That Great Day"
- 2015: How We Love, Mark Lowry: "How We Love", "When I Survey The Wondrous Cross"
- 2015: Happy Rhythm, Gaither Vocal Band: Shut De Do/Three Little Birds"
- 2016: Dogs Go To Heaven, Mark Lowry: "Jesus Laughing", "Everybody Wants To Go To Heaven", "He Leadeth Me", "Count Your Blessing", "Worry", "What A Lovely Name" (feat. Stan Whitemire) "I Thirst (Mom's Song)", "You'll Never Walk Alone", "How We Love", "Glow Worm", "On Jordan's Stormy Banks", "Old People", "The Promise", "Come As You Are"
- 2019: Good Thing, Take Time, Gaither Vocal Band: "Hear My Song, Lord"

== Solo albums ==
=== Joyce Martin Sanders ===
- 2004: Diamonds on a Dusty Road

=== Jonathan Martin ===
- 2003: Enjoy the Journey
- 2006: With One Voice

=== Judy Martin Hess ===
- 2005: Color Me

== Video ==
- 1992: The Martins: Live VHS (The Mark Five Company)
- 1996: An Evening With The Martins VHS (Spring Hill)
- 1997: Light Of The World VHS (Spring Hill)
- 2011: The Best Of The Martins DVD (Gaither Gospel Series; Spring Hill)

== Homecoming video performances ==
- 1994: Precious Memories: "He Leadeth Me"
- 1995: All Day Singin' with Dinner On the Ground: "No Not One"
- 1996: Sunday Meetin' Time: "Out Of His Great Love"
- 1996: Ryman Gospel Reunion: "Out Of His Great Love"
- 1996: Homecoming Texas: "All People That On Earth Do Dwell"
- 1996: Joy to the World: "Rejoice with Exceeding Joy"
- 1996: Moments to Remember: "He Leadeth Me"
- 1997: This Is My Story: "Count your Blessings"
- 1998: Singin’ With The Saints: "Only God Knows"
- 1998: Down By Tabernacle: "Well Water"
- 1998: Hawaiian Homecoming: "Go Tell", "Grace", "I Don't Think, I Know" (feat. Jake Hess), "Hear My Song, Lord" (Gaither Vocal Band feat. Gloria Gaither, Janet Paschal)", "It Is Well My Soul", "Softly and Tenderly"
- 1998: All Day Singin' At The Dome: "Count Your Blessing"
- 1999: Kennedy Center Homecoming: "Riverside Medley", "Until Then"
- 1999: I'll Meet You On The Mountain: "He'll Be Holdin' His Own"
- 2000: Good News: "Except For Grace"
- 2000: Memphis Homecoming: "Don't Wanna Miss A Thing"
- 2000: Christmas... A Time for Joy: "Listen to the Angels Singing", "Go Tell"
- 2001: A Billy Graham Music Homecoming – Vol. 1: "Rock of Ages" (feat. Vestal Goodman)
- 2001: A Billy Graham Music Homecoming – Vol. 2: "The Lord's Prayer"
- 2002: I'll Fly Away: "What God's Gonna Do", "Too Much to Gain to Lose" (feat. Dottie Rambo)
- 2002: Let Freedom Ring: "Redeemed", "So High"
- 2003: Red Rocks Homecoming: "May We Never Forget" (Joyce, Jonathan & Charlotte Richie)
- 2004: We Will Stand: "All People That On Earth Do Dwell" (Joyce, Judy & Paul Lancaster)
- 2004: Build A Bridge: "Great is the Lord" (Joyce, Judy & Paul Lancaster)
- 2008: Rock of Ages: "All People That On Earth Do Dwell"
- 2008: A Campfire Homecoming: "Softly and Tenderly"
- 2009: Nashville Homecoming: "The Promise"
- 2010: Count Your Blessings: "Count Your Blessing"
- 2011: The Old Rugged Cross: "Joshua Fit The Battle Of Jericho"
- 2012: Gaither Homecoming Celebration! (taped in 1998): "Jesus, What A Wonderful Child"

== Awards ==
Dove Awards:

- 1996
  - Southern Gospel Album of the Year: The Martins
  - Southern Gospel Song of the Year: "Out of His Great Love"
- 1997
  - Southern Gospel Album of the Year: Wherever You Are
  - Southern Gospel Song of the Year: "Only God Knows"
- 1998
  - Southern Gospel Album of the Year: Light Of The World
- 1999
  - Country Recorded Song of the Year: "Count Your Blessings"
- 2004
  - Inspirational Album of the Year: Above it All
  - Southern Gospel Song of the Year: "The Promise"

Grammy Award nominations:

- 1997
  - Best Southern Gospel, Country Gospel, or Bluegrass Album of the Year: Light Of The World
- 2014
  - Best Roots Gospel Album of the Year: A Cappella
- 2018
  - Best Roots Gospel Album of the Year: Still Standing
