= Guy Penrod =

American singer

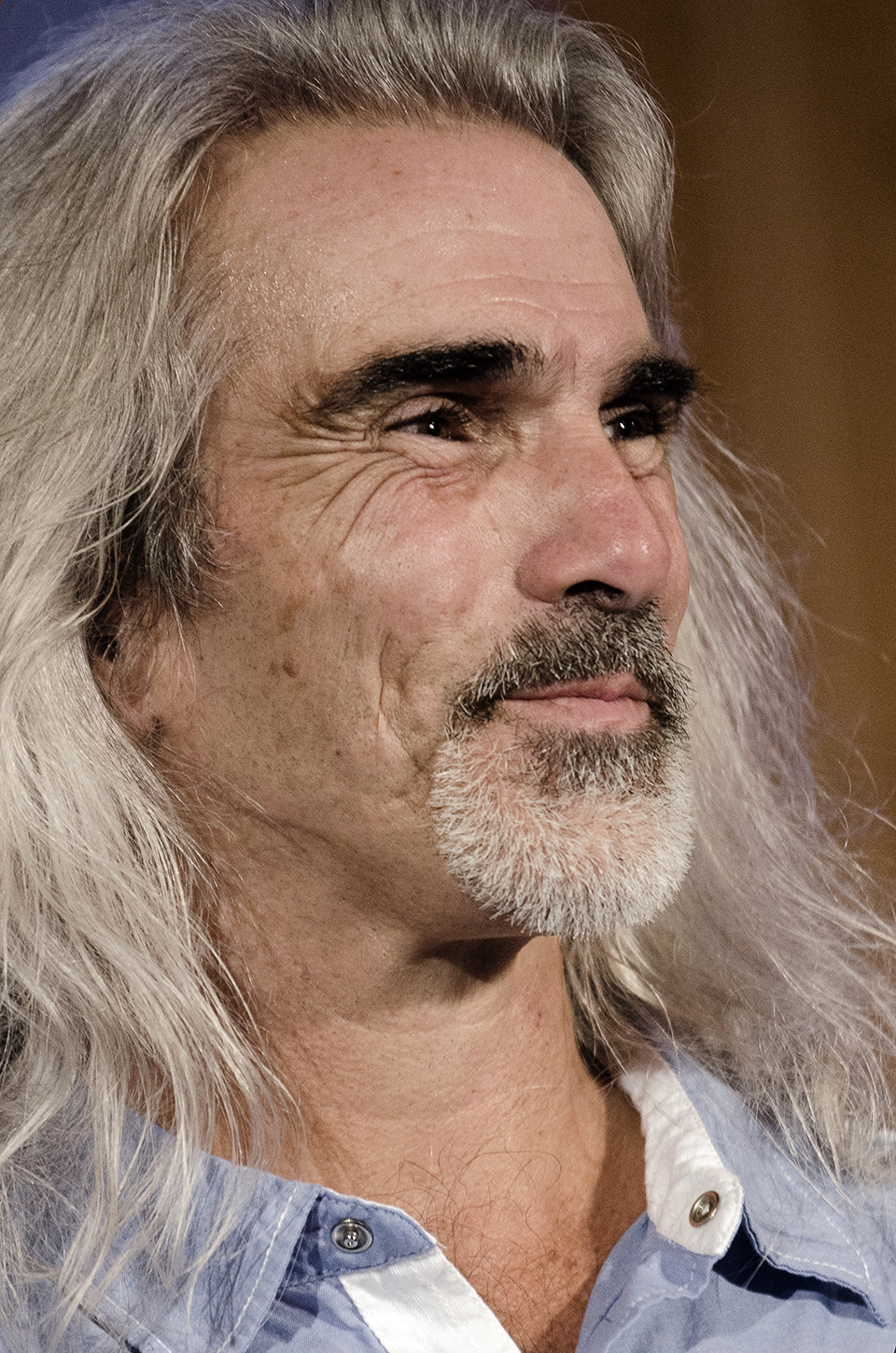

Background information
- Born: July 2, 1963 (age 63); Texas, U.S.
- Origin: Lynchburg, Virginia, U.S.
- Genres: Christian, Southern gospel
- Occupation: Singer
- Years active: 1988–present
- Member of: Gaither Vocal Band
- Website: guypenrod.com

Guy Penrod (born July 2, 1963) is an American gospel singer. He is known for his work as the lead singer of the Gaither Vocal Band, a position he held from 1995 to 2009.

== Career ==
Penrod is a graduate of Liberty University. Starting in the 1980s, he worked as a studio singer, backing up voices such as Carman, Steve Green, Amy Grant, Michael W. Smith, Garth Brooks, Shania Twain, James Ingram, and Phillips, Craig & Dean. He was also a member of the Christ Church Choir (as was another future Gaither Vocal Band member, Jonathan Pierce). During his years in the studio, he met Bill Gaither for the first time. He also made regular appearances on TNN's Music City Tonight as a background singer in the mid-1990s. In 1989 Penrod contributed a couple of tracks as lead vocal on a Brentwood cassette (C-5103N) titled "Following The Sun – Island Music For Believers".

Penrod also performed briefly with the Stamps Quartet in 1987, while employed at Opryland.

After accepting the position with the Gaither Vocal Band in 1994, Penrod became internationally known for his powerful vocals and broad singing range. He has performed in Gaither Homecoming concerts all over the U.S. and Canada, as well as in Europe, Australia, and Africa. In 1999, he performed a duet with the Cathedral Quartet's lead singer Glen Payne on their Farewell Celebration video.

Penrod performed for the grand opening of Jerry Falwell's new Thomas Road Baptist Church's new 6,000 seat sanctuary.

His album, The Best of Guy Penrod, reached No. 92 on the Billboard 200 on August 6, 2005. The DVD release was certified platinum by the RIAA.

The Gaither Vocal Band's 2006 release was entitled Give It Away, followed by Lovin' Life in 2008. Penrod won a Grammy Award for his work on the "Lovin Life" project.

In a press release on January 13, 2009, Bill Gaither announced that Penrod would be leaving the Gaither Vocal Band and starting a solo career.

In August 2009, Penrod released his debut solo album, Breathe Deep, on the Servant Records label. Produced by veteran country music producer and studio musician Brent Rowan, the album consists of positive country music with Christian undertones.

Penrod was inducted into the Texas Gospel Music Hall of Fame in 2011.

Penrod's sophomore solo album Hymns debuted at No. 1 on the Nielsen SoundScan Southern Gospel retail chart and became the top-selling southern gospel album of 2012. Hymns sold over 100,000 units.

In 2012, Penrod became the new host of Gospel Music Showcase, a popular Daystar Television Network program that focuses on southern gospel music. It can be seen every Saturday. The show has been awarded an Emmy.

Penrod won "Soloist of the Year" from the National Quartet Convention in 2013.

Penrod released his third solo project titled Worship in May 2014. In September 2014, Penrod released his first solo Christmas project entitled "Christmas." It became the No. 2 album in Cracker Barrel stores with 30,000 units sold, second only to Blake Shelton. Also in 2014, Penrod was inducted into the Gospel Music Hall of Fame alongside the Gaither Vocal Band.

Penrod released his first solo DVD entitled Live: Hymns & Worship in January 2016. The Project was filmed at Thomas Road Baptist Church. The release debuted at No. 1 on the Billboard chart for music videos sold upon its release. The album debuted at #2 on the "Billboard" chart for contemporary Christian music.

Penrod was a featured performer at the Faith Freedom & Future Inaugural Ball hosted by the Family Research Council, following the January 2017 inauguration of U.S. President Donald Trump in Washington, DC.

In March 2017, Penrod returned with an album entitled Classics. The album was a new solo recording of popular songs he performed during his tenure with the Gaither Vocal Band.

Penrod's 7th solo album, Blessed Assurance was released in February 2018. The album includes Penrod singing twelve newly recorded hymns featuring his country sound.

Penrod has often appeared on the stage of the "Grand Ole Opry" as a guest artist.

== Personal life ==
Penrod and his wife, Angie (Clark), have eight children—seven boys and a girl. All of their children are home schooled.

== Discography ==
=== Solo ===
Title	Album details	Peak chart positions		
Title	Album details	US Christian	US	US Country
The Best of Guy Penrod	Release date: July 19, 2005; Label: Gaither Music Group	4	92	—
Breathe Deep	Release date: February 23, 2010; Label: Servant/Spring House	7	108	41
Hymns	Release date: March 26, 2012; Label: Servant/Spring House	5	85	—
Worship	Release date: May 27, 2014; Label: Servant/Spring House	11	197	—
Christmas	Release date: September 2014; Label: Servant/Spring House	13	—	—
Live: Hymns & Worship	Release date: January 29, 2016; Label: Servant/Gaither Music Group	2	167	—
Classics	Release date: March 2017; Label: Servant/Gaither Music Group	—	—	—
Blessed Assurance	Release date: February 2018; Label: Servant/Gaither Music Group	24	—	—
"—" denotes unknown or no chart status

=== With the Gaither Vocal Band ===
- 1995: Southern Classics, Vol. 2
- 1997: Loving God & Loving Each Other
- 1998: Still The Greatest Story Ever Told
- 1999: God Is Good
- 2000: I Do Believe
- 2002: Everything Good
- 2003: A Cappella
- 2004: The Best Of The GVB
- 2006: Give It Away
- 2007: Together, feat. Ernie Haase & Signature Sound
- 2008: Lovin' Life
- 2008: Christmas Gaither Vocal Band Style
- 2009: Reunion, Vol. 1 & 2
- 2019: Reunion

=== Singles ===
Year	Single	Album
2009	"Knowing What I Know About Heaven"	Breathe Deep

=== Music videos ===
Year	Video	Director
2009	"Knowing What I Know About Heaven"	Steven Goldmann
