= Christmas Collection (Gaither Vocal Band album) =

Studio album by The Gaither Vocal Band
- Released: October 9, 2015
- Genres: Southern gospel, CCM
- Length: 50:05
- Label: Spring Hill

Christmas Collection is the second Christmas album from The Gaither Vocal Band. Spring Hill Music Group released the album on October 9, 2015.

== Critical reception ==
Professional ratings
Review scores
Source	Rating
CCM Magazine	4/5 stars

Awarding the album four stars from CCM Magazine, Andy Argyrakis states, "it’s a diverse blend of dynamic voices sung in perfect harmony."

== Chart performance ==
The album placed at No. 2 on the Billboard magazine Holiday Albums chart.

== Track listing ==
No.	Title	Length
1.	"Changed by a Baby Boy"	4:59
2.	"The Christmas Song" (featuring David Phelps)	3:53
3.	"O Little Town of Bethlehem"	3:08
4.	"Glorious Impossible"	4:35
5.	"Little Drummer Boy"	3:44
6.	"I'll Be Home for Christmas"	3:38
7.	"Mary, Did Your Know?"	3:51
8.	"Reaching"	4:25
9.	"Carol Medley"	3:27
10.	"Hand of Sweet Release"	4:39
11.	"Go Tell It on the Mountain"	4:29
12.	"O Holy Night" (featuring David Phelps)	5:17
Total length:		50:05

== Chart performance ==
Chart (2015)	Peak position
US Top Christian Albums (Billboard)	15
