= Wes Hampton =

American musician

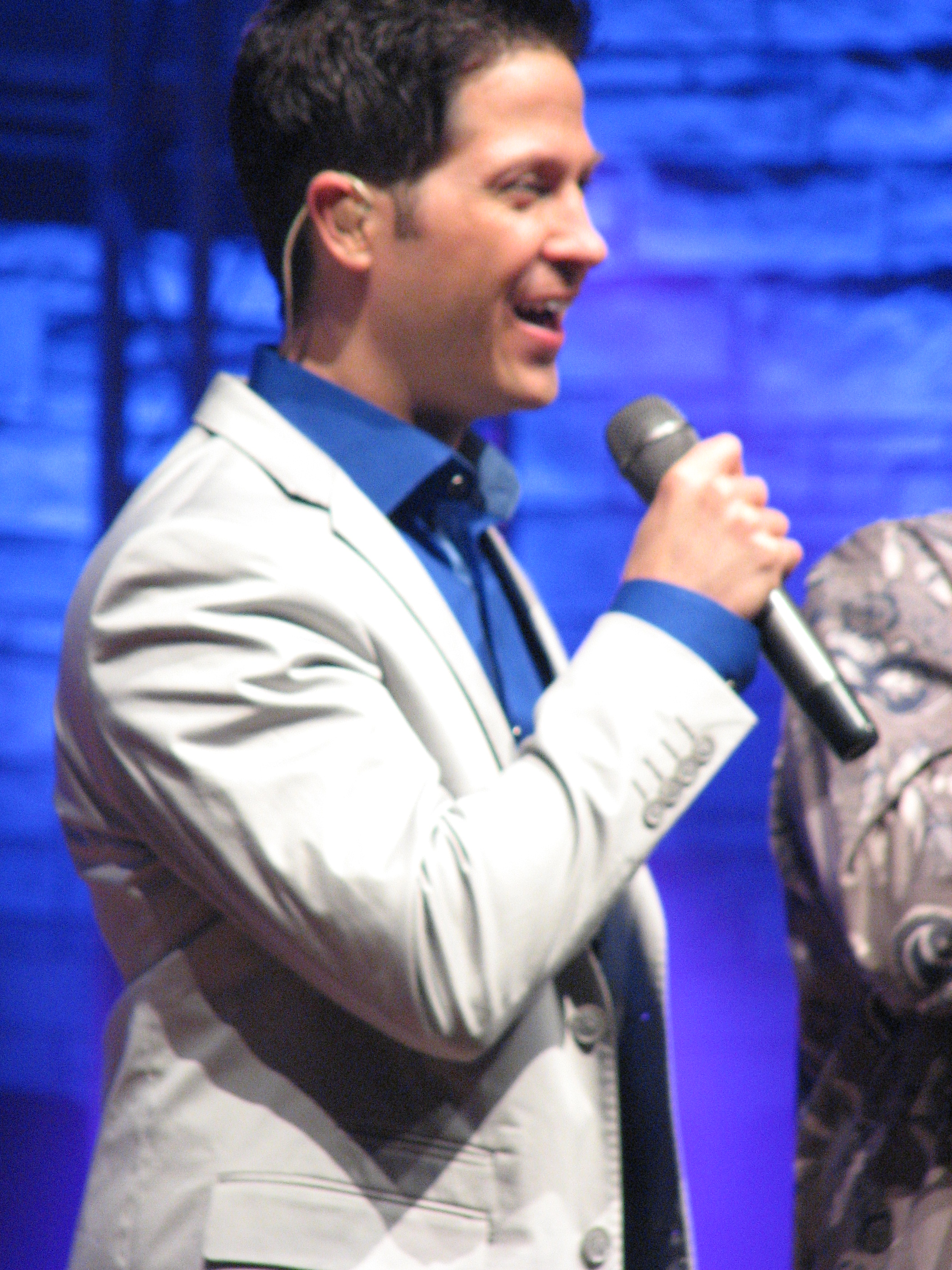
- Wes Hampton

Background information
- Born: December 8, 1977 (age 48); Memphis, Tennessee, U.S.
- Genres: Southern gospel, Christian, contemporary Christian
- Occupation: Singer
- Instrument: Vocals
- Years active: 1996–present
- Label: Spring Hill Music Group
- Website: www.weshampton.com

Wesley Adam Hampton (born December 8, 1977) is a Christian music singer. He is a tenor for The Gaither Vocal Band. Wes Hampton sang first tenor for the group from 2005 to 2009, then when it went from a quartet to a quintet, he became the second tenor. He also performs solo concerts. His first solo album was titled "A Man Like Me." Wes also appears and performs in the Gaither Homecoming video concert series, television series and cruises. Wes Hampton's 21 year tenure ranks him the longest-serving member of the Gaither Vocal Band besides Bill Gaither himself.

== Early life ==
Hampton was born in Memphis, Tennessee. He studied at Trevecca Nazarene University from 1996 to 1998, and he then went on to receive a B.A. in psychology and a minor in music from the University of Alabama at Birmingham, in 2000. He was part of the worship staff at The Church at Brook Hills, a Birmingham church, for seven years.

== Career ==
Hampton was the tenor for The Trevedores, a Christian music singing group affiliated with Trevecca Nazarene University from 1996 through 1998. In 2005, after family members passed his demo tape around to friends of Bill Gaither, Hampton auditioned to replace David Phelps as the tenor of the group. After 7 weeks of auditions Hampton joined The Gaither Vocal Band. Wes also appears in the Gaither Homecoming video series.

== Other works ==
Hampton released a cookbook in 2009 called, A Place at the Table. In 2016, he released a second cookbook, WEScipes. In 2021, he released a third cookbook, WEScipes 2.0.

== Personal life ==
Hampton is married to Andrea (Means), and they have four boys, Barrett, Hudson, Carden, and Sutton. They currently live in Nolensville, Tennessee.

== Discography ==
=== Solo ===
| Title | Album details |
|---|---|
| A Man Like Me | Release date: September 13, 2011; Label: Spring House/EMI |
| Out On A Limb | Release date: March 11, 2014; Label: Wes Hampton Music LLC |
| Wes Hampton Hymns | Release date: 2019; Label: Wes Hampton Music LLC |
| Stubborn Hope | Release date: September 23, 2022; Label: Wes Hampton |

=== Compilations ===
Some contain additional new material or alternate versions of the original albums.

- 2013: Icon (Spring House/Universal Music)
- 2015: Christmas Collection (Gaither Music Group)
- 2016: The Ultimate Playlist (Gaither Music Group) – available online only

== Awards and nominations ==
=== Grammy Awards ===
| Year | Category | Nominated work | Result |
|---|---|---|---|
| 2007 | Southern Gospel, Country Gospel or Bluegrass Gospel Album | Give It Away | Nominated |
| 2009 | Southern Gospel, Country Gospel or Bluegrass Gospel Album | Lovin' Life | Won |
| 2015 | Best Roots Gospel Album | Hymns | Nominated |

=== GMA Dove Awards ===
| 2009 | Christmas Album | Christmas Gaither Vocal Band Style | Nominated |
| 2007 | Southern Gospel Song | "Give It Away" | Won |
| 2007 | Southern Gospel Album | Give It Away | Won |
| 2009 | Southern Gospel Album | Lovin' Life | Won |
| 2010 | Southern Gospel Album | Reunited | Won |
| 2010 | Southern Gospel Album | Greatly Blessed | Won |
| 2010 | Song of the Year | "Greatly Blessed, Highly Favored" | Nominated |
| 2011 | Southern Gospel Song | "Better Day" | Won |
| 2013 | Southern Gospel Performance | "Glorious Freedom" | Nominated |
| 2013 | Bluegrass Song | "Come to Jesus" | Nominated |
| 2013 | Southern Gospel Album | Pure and Simple | Won |
| 2022 | Southern Gospel Recorded Song | My Feet Are On The Rock | Won |

=== Singing News Awards ===
2006 Singing News Horizon Individual Fan Award.
