= Lovin' Life =

Studio album by Gaither Vocal Band
- Released: April 15, 2008
- Genres: CCM, Southern Gospel
- Label: Spring Hill Music Group

Gaither Vocal Band chronology
Together (2007)	Lovin' Life (2008)	Christmas Gaither Vocal Band Style (2008)

Professional ratings
Review scores
Source	Rating
AllMusic	(?)

Lovin' Life is an album from contemporary Christian, southern gospel group Gaither Vocal Band. The album was released on April 15, 2008.

== Track listing ==
1. "I'm Forgiven" (Hibbard, Hockensmith, Omartian) - 4:00
2. "Build an Ark" (Evans) - 3:32
3. "Jesus and John Wayne" (Gaither, Gaither, Gaither, Johnson, Williams) - 3:03
4. "Go Ask" (Gaither, Gaither) - 4:23
5. "Home of Your Dreams" (Gaither, Gaither, Gaither) - 5:04
6. "Search Me Lord" (Dorsey) - 2:28
7. "Lonely Mile" (Slaughter) - 2:46
8. "There's Always a Place at the Table" (Gaither, Gaither, Gatlin) - 5:13
9. "The Diff'rence Is in Me" (Gaither, Gaither) - 3:01
10. "I'm Loving Life" (Gaither, Silvey, Williams) - 2:40
11. "When I Cry" (Gaither, Hall) - 4:29
12. "Prisoner of Hope" (Gaither, Silvey, Williams) - 3:15
13. "Then He Bowed His Head and Died" (Gaither, Gaither) - 5:22

== Awards ==
At the 40th GMA Dove Awards, Lovin' Life won a Dove Award for Southern Gospel Album of the Year. The song "Jesus and John Wayne" was nominated for Country Recorded Song of the Year. The album also won a Grammy Award for Best Southern, Country, or Bluegrass Gospel Album at the 51st Grammy Awards.

== Chart performance ==
The album peaked at #123 on the Billboard 200 and #6 on Billboard's Christian Albums.
