= Michael English (American singer) =

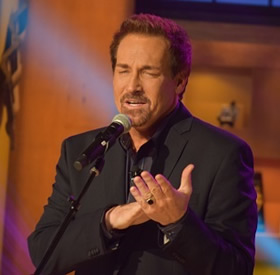

Background information
- Born: April 12, 1962 (age 64); Kenansville, North Carolina, U.S.
- Origin: Wallace, North Carolina, U.S.
- Genres: Southern gospel, pop, CCM, pop rock, adult contemporary
- Occupations: Singer, record producer
- Instrument: Voice
- Years active: 1972–present
- Labels: Warner Alliance, Curb
- Website: www.michaelenglishmusic.com

Michael English (born April 12, 1962) is an American Christian singer and record producer. Initially, he was a member of his family's singing group, and later a member of The Gaither Vocal Band. During his solo career, he recorded eight studio albums. English's highest-charting solo single was "Your Love Amazes Me", which reached No. 10 on the Adult Contemporary chart in 1996.

== Biography ==
=== Early years ===
Born in Kenansville, North Carolina English was raised by parents Aubine and Grace English, in a town called North East, near Wallace, North Carolina. English performed in his family's singing group, The Singing Samaritans, from 1972 until 1980. After graduating from high school, he joined The Singing Americans, where he shortened his name to Mike English, later going back to Michael. He left the group in 1982 and joined The Goodmans. At about the same time he married his first wife Lisa Bailey and they had a daughter Megan who was born in late 1984. After that, he joined a regional group, The Gospel Couriers, for about six months until he rejoined The Singing Americans. It was then that he had his first big success in southern gospel music with the live recording of what would become his signature song, "I Bowed on My Knees (And Cried, Holy)".

Although one of the Goodmans had brought him the song to sing and record while he was still there with them, the Singing Americans felt the song had not gone as far as it could while he sang with the group. This prompted English to record the track with the group, bringing the song its biggest success.

His last album with the Singing Americans, Black and White, was one of their most popular. It featured a single English was fairly well known for called "Welcome To Heaven", but the success of it was possibly stalled when he left the group in 1985 to join The Gaither Vocal Band as their new lead singer, replacing Gary McSpadden, who moved to sing baritone. The change of groups introduced more people to the southern gospel genre. After rising to fame as a member of the Gaither Vocal Band, Bill Gaither encouraged English to pursue a solo career. He signed his first solo recording contract with Warner Alliance in 1991 while continuing to sing lead in the Gaither Vocal Band.

His debut effort, Michael English, was well received, ultimately winning two Dove Awards in 1992 for Male Vocalist and New Artist. His first self-titled album was produced by Brown Bannister and featured major Christian radio hits in "Solid As The Rock", "Mary Did You Know" and "In Christ Alone" He left the Gaither Vocal Band in 1994. Michael was named GMA Male Vocalist of the Year in 1994. In addition to being named Male Vocalist of the Year, his single, "Holding Out Hope To You" won Inspirational Song of the Year and his 1994 recording, "Hope", was Pop/Contemporary Album of the Year.

=== Scandal ===
English's Christian music career abruptly came to a halt on May 6, 1994, just one week after the 25th GMA Dove Awards where he had received four Dove Awards, including Artist of the Year and Male Vocalist of the Year. English learned that Marabeth Jordan, with whom he had an affair, was pregnant with his child. (Jordan sang with the group First Call; First Call and English had just completed a tour for unwed mothers.) Both English and Jordan were married to other people at the time.

English was pressured by Warner Alliance to make a public apology, and he was eventually dropped by the label. Warner removed all promotions and marketing, which halted sales of English's records, and Christian radio stations pulled English's songs off the air. He also returned his Dove Awards to the Gospel Music Association. English and his wife Lisa, who were married for 11 years and had a daughter, divorced.

English stayed with friends Ashley and Wynonna Judd during his recovery period and did not perform gospel music for three years. In late 1994, English signed a record contract with Curb Records to produce mainstream pop music. A duet with Wynonna Judd, titled "Healing" (a song English had originally recorded for his album "Hope"), introduced English to a secular audience when the song was featured in the 1994 movie Silent Fall.

=== Comeback ===
In September 1996, English released a pop album, Freedom. The album's first single, "Your Love Amazes Me" (a cover of country music singer John Berry's 1994 hit), peaked at No. 10 on the adult contemporary chart but only hit No. 105 on the main chart.

At both the 1996 and 1997 Dove Awards, his co-production for album projects by The Martins won Southern Gospel Album of the Year. He also produced albums he had already started for The Stamps Quartet, The Gaither Vocal Band, and performed as a background singer on several artists' Christian albums, as well as demo work.

In August 1996, southern gospel audiences re-accepted English after promoter/historian Charles Waller reunited English with Ed Hill, Rick Strickland, Dwayne Burke and Milton Smith as the Singing Americans, before an audience of over 4,000 gospel music fans at the Grand Ole Gospel Reunion. J. D. Sumner also invited English to appear with the Stamps at the National Quartet Convention, as well as the Grand Ole Opry.

Curb Records released Gospel, produced by English and featuring his own band with arrangements he had sung in his concerts over the past several years. This album was co-produced by long-time friend Jay Demarcus of Rascal Flatts. Gary LeVox, the lead singer of Rascal Flatts, sang background vocals as well. In March 1999, Bill Gaither invited English to appear at a recording of Gaither Homecoming. Three videos were released from this taping, "Good News", "Harmony in the Heartland'", and "What a Time".

In March 2000, English recorded a new album, Heaven to Earth, which was released by Curb Records. Premiering his album on Trinity Broadcasting Network's Praise the Lord, English gave a testimony of what God had brought him through and shared his story about his addiction to painkillers and subsequent treatment and rehab.

In addition to touring, English released his autobiography, The Prodigal Comes Home, in April 2007.

In 2009, English rejoined the Gaither Vocal Band—making it a quintet—singing lead.

=== 2010–present ===
On March 4, 2010, English underwent surgery on the spinal column in his neck. While he was recovering, Marshall Hall came back to fill in for two months, and Reggie Smith filled in for one month. With an emotional concert return, English sang again with the vocal band on August 1, 2010.

English was inducted into the North Carolina Music Hall of Fame in 2011.

In October 2013, it was announced that English would be leaving the Gaither Vocal Band to devote more time to his solo career. His departure was effective immediately. His final appearance with the group was performing "Alpha and Omega" at the 2013 Dove Awards. Since his Gaither Vocal Band departure Michael has appeared on numerous Gaither Vocal Band Reunion videos and has released three studio albums, a live album and a greatest hits recording: The Best of Michael English.

== Discography ==
=== With the Singing Americans ===
- 1981: The Exciting Sounds of the Singing Americans (Victory Records)
- 1981: Hymntime (Halo Records; also released as Sing Hymns)
- 1984: Something Old Something New (Mark Five Records)
- 1984: Live And Alive (Riversong Records)
- 1984: "I Bowed on My Knees And Cried Holy" (single)
- 1985: Black And White (Riversong)

=== With the Happy Goodmans ===
- 1982: Goodman Greats (Canaan Records)
- 1982: Chosen (Canaan)

=== With the Gaither Vocal Band ===
See Gaither Vocal Band discography

- 1986: One X 1
- 1988: Wings
- 1990: A Few Good Men
- 1991: Homecoming
- 1993: Peace of the Rock
- 1993: Southern Classics
- 2009: Reunion Vol. 1
- 2009: Reunion Vol. 2
- 2009: Reunited
- 2010: Greatly Blessed
- 2011: I Am a Promise
- 2012: Pure and Simple
- 2014: Hymns
- 2019: Reunion Live
- 2020: Reunited Live

=== Solo albums ===
- 1991: Michael English (Curb Records)
- 1993: Hope (Curb)
- 1996: Freedom (Curb)
- 1998: Gospel (Curb)
- 2000: Heaven to Earth (Curb)
- 2003: A Michael English Christmas (Curb)
- 2006: Greatest Hits: In Christ Alone (Curb)
- 2008: The Prodigal Comes Home (Curb)
- 2013: Some People Change (Curb)
- 2015: Worship (Daywind)
- 2017: Love is the Golden Rule (Daywind)

Compilations

- 1995: Healing (Curb Records) (with 2 new tracks)
- 2006: Michael English Greatest Hits: In Christ Alone (Curb) (with 2 new tracks)
- 2021: Best of Michael English

Live

- 2015: Live at Daywind Studios (DVD-CD) (Daywind)

=== Singles ===
Year	Single	Peak chart positions		
Year	Single	US CHR AC	US AC	US
1995	"Healing" (with Wynonna Judd)	—	—	120
1996	"Your Love Amazes Me"	—	10	105
2000	"Heaven to Earth"	17	—	—
2008	"Feels Like Redemption"	26	—	—

== Music videos ==
Year	Song	Director
1994	"Healing"	Randee St. Nicholas
2017	"Love is the Golden Rule"	Scott Godsey

== Accolades ==
GMA Dove Awards

Year	Category	Nominated work	Result
1992	New Artist of the Year		Won
1992	Male Vocalist of the Year		Won
1993	Male Vocalist of the Year		Won
1993	Praise and Worship Album of the Year	Coram Deo (shared with Michael Card, Charlie Peacock, Susan Ashton, Out of the Grey, Charlie Peacock)	Won
1994	Vocalist of the Year		Won
1994	Male Vocalist of the Year		Won
1994	Inspirational Song of the Year	"Holding Out Hope To You"	Won
1994	Pop/Contemporary Album of the Year	Hope	Won
1994	Southern Gospel Song of the Year	Southern Classics; Gaither Vocal Band (co-producer)	Won
