= Mark Lowry =

American singer

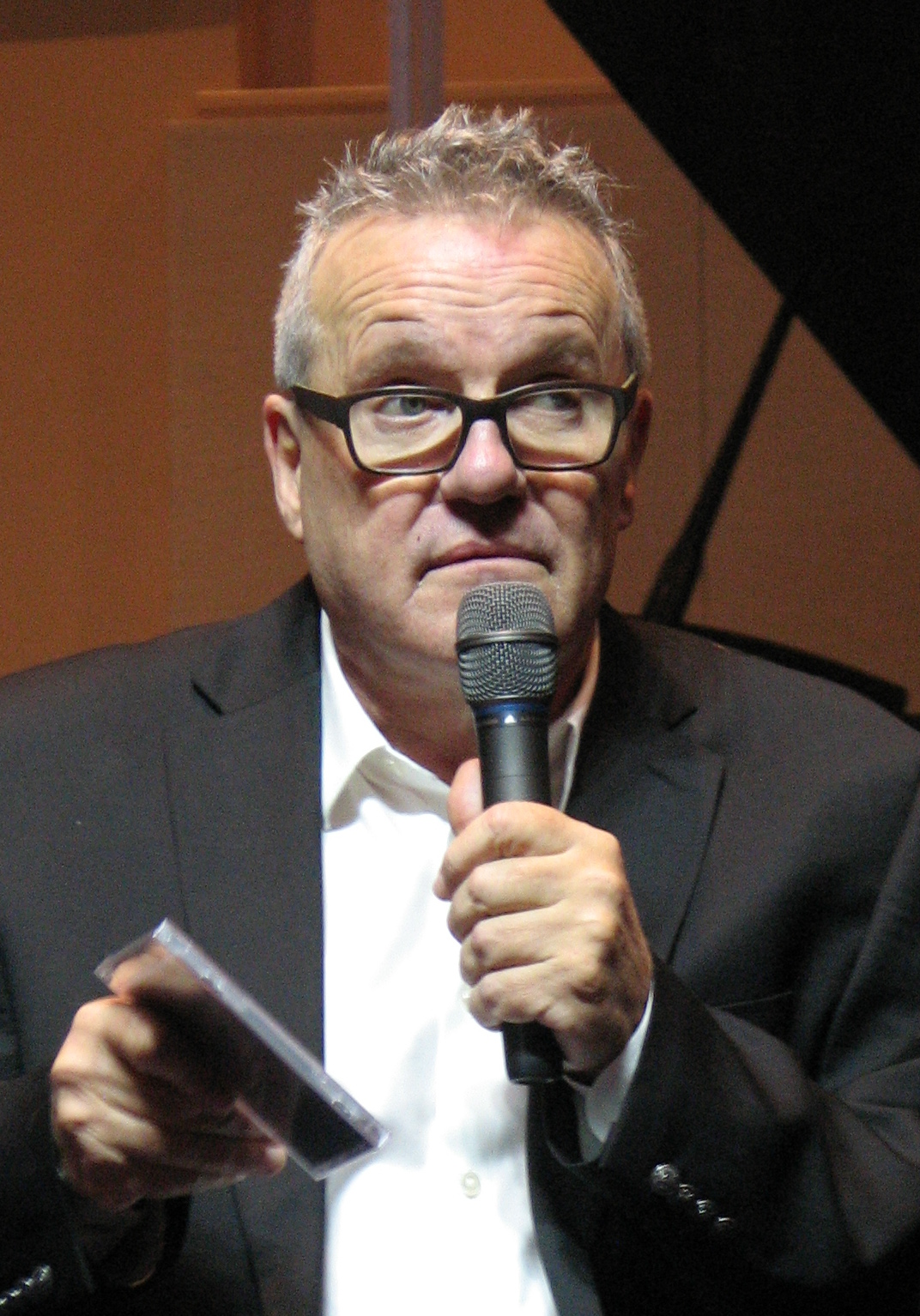
- Lowry in 2018

Background information
- Born: Mark Alan Lowry; June 24, 1958 (age 68); Houston, Texas, U.S.
- Genre: Southern gospel
- Occupations: Singer, songwriter, minister, comedian
- Years active: 1980–present
- Website: www.marklowry.com

Mark Alan Lowry (born June 24, 1958) is an American singer, comedian, minister, and songwriter. He is best known for co-writing the song "Mary, Did You Know?" and being a member of the Gaither Vocal Band from 1988 to 2001, and 2009 to 2013, along with Michael English, Guy Penrod, David Phelps, and Bill Gaither. Lowry has recorded 12 albums, both music and comedy.

== Early life ==
Lowry was born in Houston, Texas, to Charles, an attorney, and Beverly Lowry. He often uses anecdotes of his young life in his comedy, as well as speaking of his experience with hyperactivity and attention-deficit disorder in his performances. He had a hard time getting through school, and he could not sit still for very long. He is a self-described "Poster Boy for Hyperactivity".

== Early career ==
While attending Liberty Baptist College (now known as Liberty University), Lowry joined a college evangelistic team made of Charles Hughes and David Musselman and began singing.

In 1978, Lowry was badly injured in a car accident near Carlisle, Pennsylvania, while touring with his college evangelistic team. He sustained 11 broken bones, and spent a good deal of time in physical therapy recovering from the accident.

After graduating from college, Lowry began singing in Baptist churches professionally. His comedy career inadvertently began from here. An elongated pause occurred in his singing performance while he waited for the soundtrack to be changed. Lowry began to fill this pause with a monologue. He soon realized that the audiences at his performances were laughing not at him but at his monologues.

== "Mary, Did You Know?" ==
In 1984, Lowry wrote the lyrics to the song "Mary, Did You Know?", when asked to write a script for a church Christmas play. He wrote a series of questions that he would like to ask Mary, the mother of Jesus. These questions were used in between the scenes of the play. Over the next decade, Lowry tried to find music that would complete the song. Eventually, musician and songwriter Buddy Greene wrote the music to the song. The Christmas play script then became the song.

The song has become a popular Christmas song performed by more than 30 artists, including Cee Lo Green, Clay Aiken, Kenny Rogers, Wynonna Judd, Michael English, Daniel Childs, Helen Baylor, Natalie Cole, Pippa Wilson, Kathy Mattea, Michael Crawford, Zara Larsson, Peter Hollens, Marnell Tanner, Dolly Parton, and Pentatonix. In 2016, Lowry himself sang it, backed by the a cappella group, Voctave.

The lyrics have been criticised for perceived ambiguity or lack of scriptural or theological depth. Baptist theologian Michael Frost suggests it is the "most sexist Christmas song ever written... It treats her like a clueless child... Could you imagine a song asking Abraham 17 times if he knew he'd be the father of a great nation?"

== The Gaither Vocal Band ==
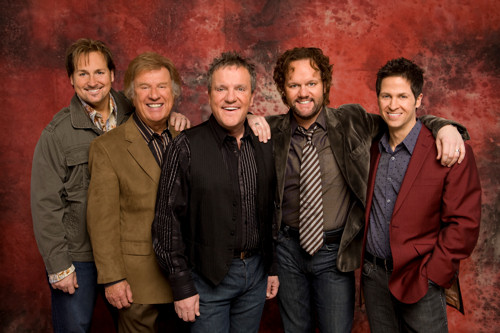
Lowry (center) and the Gaither Vocal Band, 2009

In 1988, Lowry was approached by Bill Gaither and asked to join the Gaither Vocal Band as the baritone. Lowry's career with the band spanned 13 years during his first stint with the group. His on-stage antics were popular with audiences. As a result, he became the co-host of the many concerts and shows performed by Gaither and the Vocal Band, with Gaither playing the straight man to Lowry's antics.

In June 2001, Lowry resigned from the Gaither Vocal Band after performing longer with the group than any previous member except Gaither himself. After that, Lowry released several solo albums, including I Love to Tell the Story, A Hymns Collection.

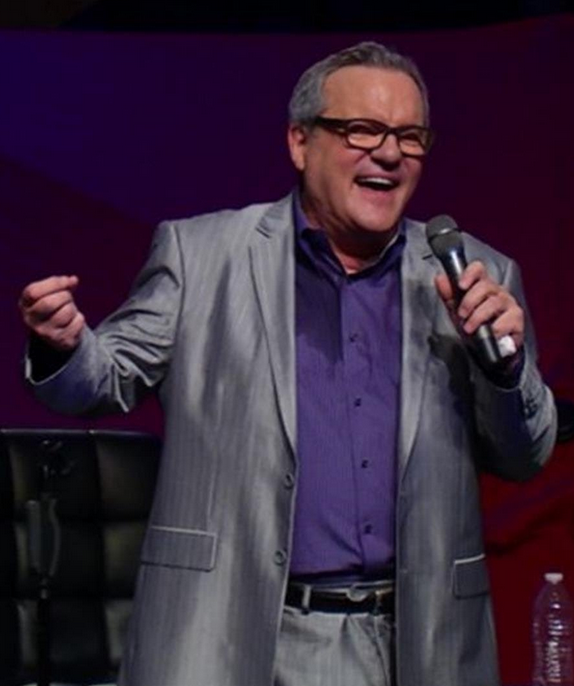
Lowry circa 2014

On January 14, 2009, Lowry was announced to be returning to the Gaither Vocal Band while maintaining his solo career. In October 2013, Lowry and Michael English were announced as leaving the group to devote more time to their solo careers. Lowry stayed on through the end of the year.

== Videos ==
Lowry's first video was Mark Lowry: My First Comedy Video made in 1988. Next, he made Mark Lowry: The Last Word in 1992 at the Tivoli Theatre in Chattanooga, Tennessee. He taped Mark Lowry: Mouth in Motion in 1993 at Carpenter's Home Church in Lakeland, Florida. The album won a Dove Award for Long Form Music Video of the Year at the 25th GMA Dove Awards in 1994. He made Mark Lowry: Remotely Controlled in 1995. Mark Lowry on Broadway was performed and captured to DVD at the Beacon Theatre in New York City in 2000, and Mark Lowry Goes to Hollywood was performed and captured to DVD at the Cerritos Center in Cerritos, California, in January 2005.

== Current projects ==
Lowry continues to tour the United States performing his music and comedy concerts, as well as recording music and comedy CD albums and videos. He records and publishes several podcasts, including Saturdays with Mark and Tony, a weekly podcast with Tony Campolo. He co-hosts Bill Gaither's Homecoming Radio with Bill Gaither and Phil Brower. Starting in March 2011, he has been a frequent co-host of the Red Letter Christians TV show with Campolo.

Lowry has streamed live almost every day on his YouTube channel since the start of the COVID-19 pandemic. He livestreams "Just Whenever" several times a week, if not daily, and hosts "First Mondays with Mark" on the first Monday of each month, joined by his friends Coleen and Phillip.

== Personal life ==
Lowry is single. He has a brother, sister, three nieces, and three nephews.

On December 2, 2013 Lowry's mother died aged 79 and then on May 18, 2022, his father died aged 90.

Lowry has talked often in his comedy about having ADHD when he was a child. He has joked that he now has "dropped the H" because he's "too old to be hyper"."
