= Spring Hill Music Group =

Contemporary Christian music record label

- Founded: 1994
- Genre: Contemporary Christian music
- Country of origin: U.S.
- Official website: www.springhillmusic.com

Spring Hill Music Group is a contemporary Christian music record label based in the United States. As of July 2007, the Spring Hill Music Group is home to nineteen different Christian artists and produces the Shout! series and Songtime Kids record series.

== History ==
Spring Hill was founded in 1994 as Chapel Music Group by Bill Gaither and Leland Boren.

== Labels ==
As of July 2007, Spring Hill Music Group is also the parent label of two smaller Christian labels: Slanted Records, a self-described progressive pop and modern rock Christian label and Spring Hill Worship, a label dedicated to releasing Christian worship music albums; Green Hill Music, which markets easy-listening, jazz, inspirational and pop general-market releases to specialty retailers, and Hillsboro to target instrumental jazz.

Notable Christian artists signed by Spring Hill Music Group, as of July 2007, include: DecembeRadio (Slanted Records), Al Denson, Eden's Bridge, Buddy Greene, Inhabited (Slanted Records), Janet Paschal, Scott Krippayne, Oak Ridge Boys, Dottie Rambo, and Wayne Watson.

== See also ==
- List of contemporary Christian music record labels
- List of record labels
