= Bill Gaither =

American singer and songwriter (born 1936)

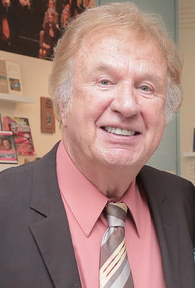
- Gaither in 2016

Background information
- Born: William James Gaither; March 28, 1936 (age 90); Alexandria, Indiana, U.S.
- Genres: Southern gospel, contemporary Christian
- Occupations: Singer, songwriter, record producer
- Years active: 1951–present
- Labels: Spring House Productions, Gaither Music Group/EMI Christian
- Member of: Gaither Vocal Band
- Formerly of: Bill Gaither Trio
- Spouse: Gloria Gaither
- Website: gaither.com

William James Gaither (/ˈɡeɪθər/ GAY-thər; born March 28, 1936) is an American singer and songwriter of southern gospel and contemporary Christian music. He has written numerous popular Christian songs with his wife Gloria; he is also known for performing as part of the Bill Gaither Trio and the Gaither Vocal Band. In the 1990s, his career gained a resurgence (as well as the careers of other southern gospel artists), as popularity grew for the Gaither Homecoming series. In 2023, he released a secular music album with the Gaither Vocal Band entitled Love Songs.

== Early life ==
Bill Gaither was born in Alexandria, Indiana, in 1936 to George William Gaither and Lela Olga Hartwell. He formed his first group, the Bill Gaither Trio (consisting of Bill, his sister Mary Ann (1945–2018), and brother Danny Gaither (1938–2001)), in 1956 while a college student at Anderson College, to which he had transferred after one year at Taylor University. He graduated from Anderson in 1959 with a major in English and a minor in music, after which he worked as an English teacher. He married the former Gloria Sickal in 1962.

After earning his master's degree from Evangel University in 1961, Gaither entered into the fledgling Gospel Music Association, founded in 1964, and helped organize the first Dove Awards ceremony in 1969.

He tried for a few years to manage both a music career and his full-time teaching job, but he quit his teaching job in 1967 and began working full-time in the Christian music industry. He recorded his breakthrough song "He Touched Me" in 1964.

Gaither was influenced by Southern gospel singers such as Jake Hess and Hovie Lister and by groups such as the Speers, the Statesmen, and the Happy Goodmans.

== Songwriter ==
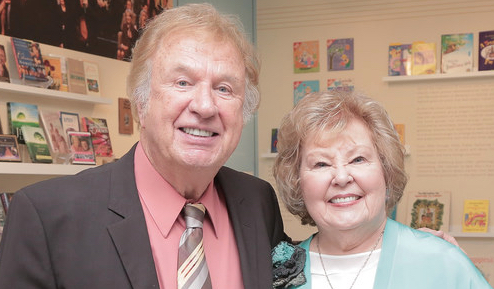
Bill & Gloria Gaither in 2016

Gaither and his wife, Gloria, have written numerous well-known gospel songs, including "The Longer I Serve Him", "Because He Lives", "The King Is Coming", "Sinner Saved by Grace", "Something Beautiful", "He Touched Me", "It Is Finished", "There's Something About That Name", "I'm Gonna Sing", and "Let's Just Praise the Lord". His songs have been performed by Christian artists (David Crowder Band, Carman, The Imperials, Sandi Patty, The Cathedral Quartet, The Speers and the Heritage Singers), country singers (The Oak Ridge Boys, The Statler Brothers), and pop artists (Elvis Presley). A video of a man surreptitiously recorded playing "Jesus, There's Something About That Name" on a piano in his destroyed house was shared by many people following the Tornado outbreak of December 10–11, 2021.

Gloria Gaither often writes the lyrics while Bill writes the music, although composing is usually a collaborative project between the two. As of 2005, they had composed 600 songs, and by 2012 that number had increased to over 700.

== Performer ==
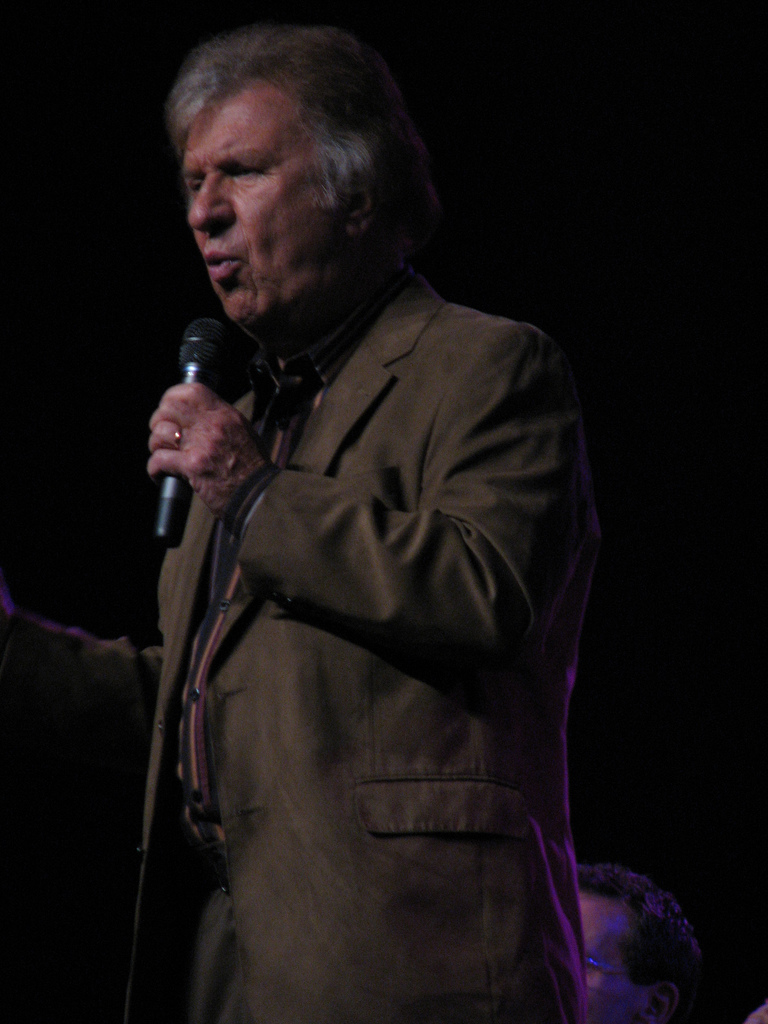
Bill Gaither performing, 2011

After graduating from high school, Gaither took a job in 1955 at Worthington, Ohio's radio station WRFD as a member of the station's gospel quartet. Since Gaither first began singing with the Bill Gaither Trio in the 1950s, he has continued performing throughout his career. The trio originally consisted of Bill, his brother Danny Gaither, and his sister Mary Ann Gaither. Around 1964, Bill's wife Gloria replaced Mary Ann. The trio sang traditional gospel songs along with original compositions by the Gaithers, giving them a more contemporary feel.

Gaither has a high bass voice (or low baritone) and often sang while playing piano with the Bill Gaither Trio.

== Entrepreneurship and influence ==
Gaither founded the Gaither Music Company, which includes the functions of a record company, concert booking (Gaither Management Group), television production, copyright management (Gaither Copyright Management), retail store, recording studio (Gaither Studios, formerly Pinebrook Studios) and telemarketing for the Gaither organization. He also ran the Gaither Family Resources retail center.

Also included within the company is Live Bait Productions, an animation company run by Benjy Gaither, one of Bill's three children.

=== Record labels ===
In the 1980s, Gaither was involved with Paragon Associates, which formed a partnership with Zondervan to buy Benson Records, which is now part of Sony BMG Music Entertainment.

In 1994, Gaither and entrepreneur Leland Boren founded the Brentwood, Tennessee-based Chapel Hill Music Group, which later changed its name to Spring Hill Music Group. It was created as part of the Gaither Music Company to handle in-house productions, including the Gaither Homecoming series.

=== Industry influence ===
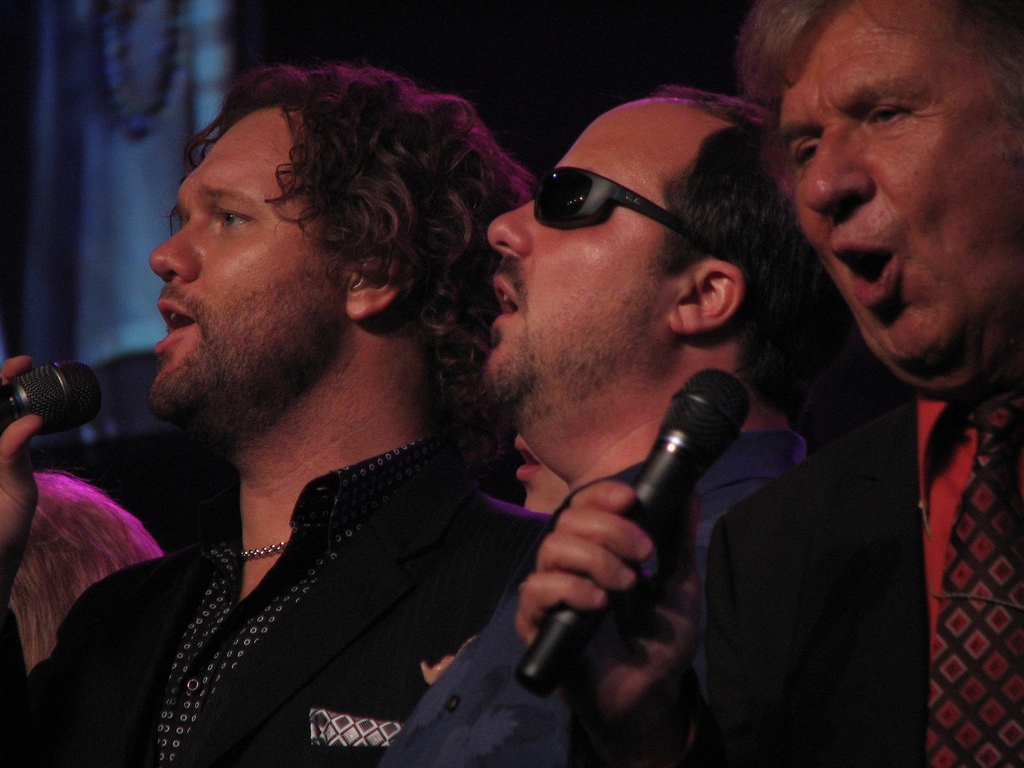
David Phelps, Gordon Mote, Bill Gaither (left to right) in April 2009

Gaither has been a father figure and career booster to many younger performers in the Christian music industry, while helping to prolong the careers of those who came before him, for example, by producing Homecoming recordings and tours. CCM artists who either got their start or became popular while touring with the Gaithers include Mark Lowry, Michael W. Smith, Carman, Sandi Patty, Steve Green, Don Francisco, Amy Grant, Michael English, Jonathan Pierce, Karla Worley, and Cynthia Clawson.

Gaither has maintained the Gaither Vocal Band with a variety of singers through the years, including Gary McSpadden, Steve Green, Lee Young, Jon Mohr, Larnelle Harris, Michael English, Lemuel Miller, Jim Murray, Mark Lowry, Terry Franklin, Buddy Mullins, Jonathan Pierce, Guy Penrod, David Phelps, Russ Taff, Marshall Hall, Wes Hampton, Adam Crabb, Todd Suttles and Reggie Smith. Penrod, Lowry and Hampton were the members of the Gaither Vocal Band with the longest tenure besides Gaither himself. Penrod was with the group from 1995 to 2008, and Lowry from 1988 to 2001; Hampton has been with the Gaither Vocal Band since 2005. It was announced in January 2009 that Lowry, English and Phelps were rejoining; at the same time the announcement was made that Penrod and Hall were leaving.

Gaither's Homecoming tours, which started in 1991, brought together major stars of the southern gospel and CCM industry, sparking a revival of the genres. The tours have sold more than 1.1 million tickets across the world, and have included such notable venues as the Kennedy Center and Carnegie Hall. Pollstar listed the tour as selling more tickets in 2004 than Elton John, Fleetwood Mac or Rod Stewart. Lynda Randle, the Isaacs, Russ Taff, the Hoppers, Jessy Dixon and many more have performed on the tours.

== Personal life ==
Bill and Gloria live in Alexandria, Indiana, and have three grown children, Suzanne, Amy, and Benjy.

== Discography ==
=== Solo ===
- 2005: Bill Gaither

== Bibliography ==
(This list excludes books of music and books that are companions to his "Homecoming" series.)

- 2003: Bill Gaither and Ken Abraham. It's More than Music: Life Lessons on Friends, Faith, and What Matters Most. Anderson, Indiana: Warner Books. (ISBN 0-446-53041-7)
- 1992: Bill Gaither and Jerry Jerkins. I Almost Missed the Sunset. Thomas Nelson (publisher). (ISBN 0-8407-7573-3)
- 1997: Bill Gaither and Jerry Jerkins. Homecoming. Zondervan. (ISBN 0-310-21325-8)
- 2000: Bill and Gloria Gaither. God Gave Song. Zondervan. (ISBN 0-310-23123-X)

== Awards and honors ==
=== Grammy Awards ===
- 1973: Best Inspirational Performance for "Let's Just Praise The Lord"; Bill Gaither Trio
- 1975: Best Inspirational Performance for "Jesus, We Just Want To Thank You"; Bill Gaither Trio
- 1991: Best Southern Gospel Album for Homecoming; Gaither Vocal Band
- 1999: Best Southern, Country, Or Bluegrass Gospel Album for Kennedy Center Homecoming
- 2001: Best Southern, Country, or Bluegrass Gospel Album for A Billy Graham Music Homecoming
- 2008: Best Southern, Country, Or Bluegrass Gospel Album for Lovin' Life; Gaither Vocal Band

=== GMA Dove Awards ===
- 1969, 1970, 1972–'77: Songwriter of the Year
- 1974: Song of the Year for "Because He Lives"
- 1976: Inspirational Album of the Year for Jesus, We Just Want to Thank You; Bill Gaither Trio
- 1978: Inspirational Album of the Year for Pilgrim's Progress; Bill Gaither Trio
- 1980: Mixed Group of the Year – Bill Gaither Trio
- 1986: Praise and Worship Album of the Year for I’ve Just Seen Jesus (choral)
- 1987: Southern Gospel Album of the Year for The Master Builder; The Cathedrals (producer)
- 1991: Southern Gospel Album of the Year for Climbing Higher & Higher; The Cathedrals (producer)
- 1992: Southern Gospel Album of the Year for Homecoming; Gaither Vocal Band
- 1993: Southern Gospel Album of the Year for Reunion: A Gospel Homecoming Celebration
- 1994: Southern Gospel Album of the Year for Southern Classics; Gaither Vocal Band
- 1994: Southern Gospel Song of the Year for "Satisfied"; Gaither Vocal Band
- 1995: Southern Gospel Song of the Year for "I Bowed On My Knees"
- 1999: Southern Gospel Album of the Year for Still the Greatest Story Ever Told; Gaither Vocal Band
- 1995: Southern Gospel Song of the Year for "I Believe in a Hill Called Mount Calvary"; Gaither Vocal Band
- 2000: Southern Gospel Album of the Year for God is Good; Gaither Vocal Band
- 2001: Southern Gospel Album of the Year for I Do Believe; Gaither Vocal Band
- 2001: Southern Gospel Song of the Year for "God Is Good All The Time"; Gaither Vocal Band
- 2001: Long Form Video of the Year for A Farewell Celebration; The Cathedrals (producer)
- 2002: Southern Gospel Album of the Year for Encore; Old Friends Quartet (producer)
- 2002: Southern Gospel Song of the Year for "He's Watching Me"; Gaither Vocal Band
- 2007: Southern Gospel Album of the Year for Give It Away; Gaither Vocal Band
- 2007: Southern Gospel Song of the Year for "Give It Away"; Gaither Vocal Band
- 2009: Southern Gospel Album of the Year for Lovin' Life; Gaither Vocal Band
- 2010: Southern Gospel Album of the Year for Reunited; Gaither Vocal Band
- 2010: Long Form Video of the Year for A Gospel Journey; Oak Ridge Boys (producer)
- 2011: Southern Gospel Song of the Year for "Better Day"; Gaither Vocal Band
- 2011: Southern Gospel Album of the Year for Greatly Blessed; Gaither Vocal Band

=== Other honors ===
- 1974, 1980: ASCAP Best Gospel Song of the Year
- 1983: Inducted into the Gospel Music Association Hall of Fame
- 1997: Named among the top 75 American entrepreneurs: Entrepreneur Magazine
- 1997: Inducted into the SGMA Hall of Fame
- 2000: Christian "Songwriter of the Century" (with Gloria Gaither): American Society of Composers and Publishers (ASCAP)
- 2006: SPEBSQSA Honorary Life Member
- 2010: Indiana Wesleyan University Society of World Changers inductee and honorary doctorate recipient
- 2012: Concert Promotor of the Year: NQC Music Awards
- 2026: Pillar Award for Impact: Museum of the Bible
