= Gaither Vocal Band =

American vocal group

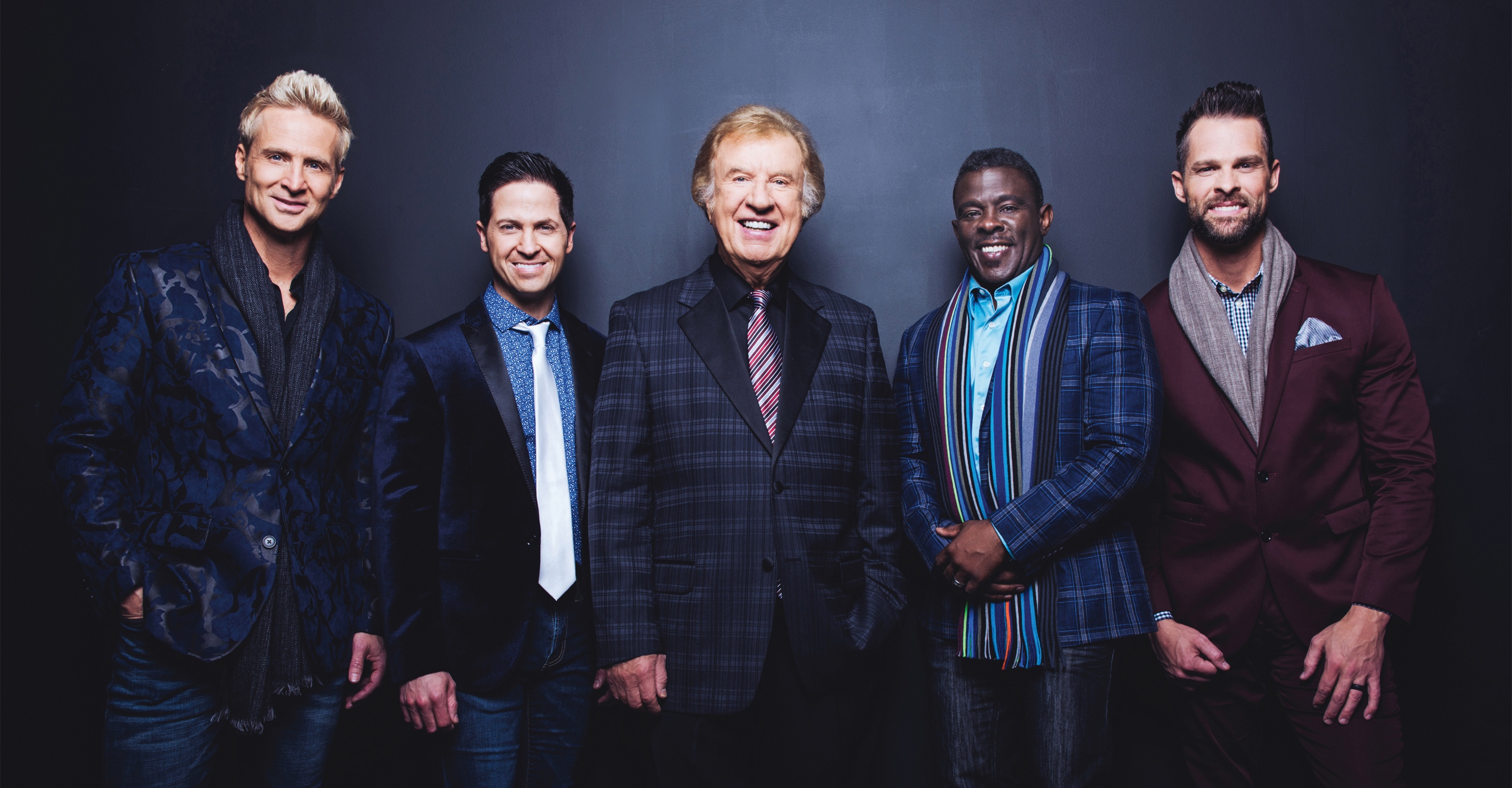
- Gaither Vocal Band in 2017; From left: Reggie Smith, Wes Hampton, Bill Gaither, Todd Suttles, Adam Crabb

Background information
- Also known as: New Gaither Vocal Band (1981–1985)
- Origin: Alexandria, Indiana, United States
- Genres: Christian; southern gospel; contemporary Christian
- Years active: 1981–present
- Label: Spring Hill
- Members: Bill Gaither; Reggie Smith; Wes Hampton; Adam Crabb; Todd Suttles
- Website: gaither.com/artists/gaither-vocal-band-0

The Gaither Vocal Band is an American Southern gospel vocal group, named after its founder and leader Bill Gaither. In March 2017, it was announced that the Gaither Vocal Band lineup consisted of Reggie Smith, Wes Hampton, Adam Crabb, Todd Suttles, and Bill Gaither. Although the group started out recording contemporary Christian music in the 1980s, it became known for Southern gospel after the popularity of the Gaither Homecoming videos.

The lineup of the band has changed many times, with artists leaving to work on solo careers. Besides Gaither, singers with the longest tenure in the band include Guy Penrod (1995–2009), Mark Lowry (1988–2001, 2009–14), Michael English (1985–94, 2009–14), David Phelps (1997–2005, 2009–17), and Wes Hampton (2005–present).

The band has released 29 albums (not including compilations), at least 19 of which have charted. The band has also released 10 DVDs, which feature many other Christian artists as well. The Gaither Vocal Band has been honored with two Grammys and 17 Dove Awards.

== History ==
=== Beginnings ===
The Gaither Vocal Band is named after gospel leader Bill Gaither. It was the successor of the Bill Gaither Trio. By the 1980s, Bill Gaither, along with wife Gloria Gaither, were both very successful songwriters. For example, their song "He Touched Me" was covered by Elvis Presley, after which he named his album He Touched Me. Presley won a Grammy for the album. Gaither felt that his trio had reached its peak in the mid-1980s, but his desire to make another gospel hit kept the trio going.

The original Vocal Band (called the New Gaither Vocal Band) was formed spontaneously, backstage of a Gaither Trio concert. It consisted of Bill Gaither and Gary McSpadden of the trio, along with two of the trio's backup singers, Steve Green and Lee Young. The quartet sang "Your First Day in Heaven" on stage that night. Their debut album, the self-titled The New Gaither Vocal Band, debuted in 1981.

According to the liner notes of the CD compilation The Best of the GVB, the term "vocal band" was used instead of "quartet" because it did not limit Gaither in terms of sound or number of group members.

Young left the group in 1982, and Jon Mohr was hired as the new bass singer. They then recorded the album Passin' the Faith Along. Later, Green left and Larnelle Harris was hired. This group cut the New Point Of View album before Mohr left.

=== Widespread popularity ===
Michael English was hired as the new lead singer, so McSpadden was moved down to baritone, and Gaither dropped to bass. At this point the group dropped the "new" part of their name. Although the previous album (New Point of View) had been more contemporary than its predecessors, the album with this version of the group (One X 1) took it even further. After this album, Harris left and was replaced by Lemuel Miller. The group did not record an album with Miller before he too left. He was replaced by Imperials alumnus Jim Murray. This lineup cut one album (Wings) before Gary McSpadden left to start his solo career. Mark Lowry was convinced to replace him. Their gospel roots project Homecoming was released in 1991. Murray left and was replaced by Terry Franklin. The album Southern Classics was released in 1993 with the hit "I Bowed on My Knees" (co-written by Jeremy Ward).

English left in 1994. He was replaced by Buddy Mullins. Mullins was only a temporary fill-in, but he was included on the album Testify. Franklin soon left and was replaced by yet another Imperials alumnus, Jonathan Pierce (formerly known as Jonathan Hildreth, his first and last name, then changed to his first and middle name). Strengthened by the popularity of the Homecoming video series, the Vocal Band added Guy Penrod as lead following the departure of Mullins. After Pierce's departure, Gaither hired David Phelps as tenor. After Lowry's departure, Imperials alumnus Russ Taff sang baritone for a couple of years. Marshall Hall was his replacement. Wes Hampton succeeded Phelps in 2005.

The group has had three number one songs on the Singing News chart. "Yes, I Know" held the top position from July to October 1997, as did "I Will Go On" in November 2006. "Greatly Blessed" was their third number one single. The group has routinely performed classic Southern gospel songs including many written by Bill and Gloria Gaither like "He Touched Me", "I Believe In A Hill Called Mount Calvary", and "Sinner Saved By Grace".

=== Reunion ===
In July 2008, the vocal band recorded a reunion DVD at the Gaither Studios — The Gaither Vocal Band Reunion, Volumes 1 and 2. Except for Pierce, Franklin, and Miller, the former and present members appeared and performed. The two CDs debuted in the top two positions on Billboard's Contemporary Christian Album chart, marking the Gaither Vocal Band's first No. 1 on the Christian Album chart. The DVDs of the same title debuted in the No. 1 and No. 2 positions on the Music Video charts as well. It also garnered a Grammy Award for Best Southern, Country, Bluegrass Gospel Album.

=== The quintet ===
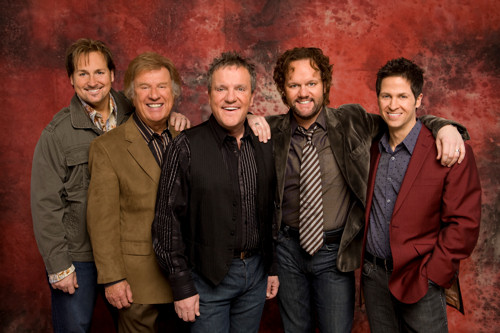
Gaither Vocal Band, 2009

In January 2009, Hall and Penrod left. Gaither brought back some former members: English as lead vocal, Lowry as baritone and Phelps as tenor. The first album by this five-member version was Reunited, released in September 2009. It was also the first album of the vocal band to feature only songs written by Bill and Gloria Gaither. A live album called Better Day was released in January 2010. In August 2010, they released the album Greatly Blessed, followed by I Am A Promise, a children's album, released in August 2011. Their next album was Pure and Simple, released in September 2012.

In October 2013, it was announced that Lowry and English would once again be leaving the group to devote more time to their solo careers. English's departure was immediate whereas Lowry stayed on until they could find another baritone to replace him. Their last album as members, Hymns, was released in March 2014 and was nominated for a Grammy Award the following December. After their departure, several guests filled in until two new members could be found. In January 2014, it was announced that Adam Crabb (of The Crabb Family) would join the group as the fourth member and lead singer. Todd Suttles joined the group as the baritone singer one month later.

Following their formation, the new quintet released a limited-edition album, The New Edition, which could only be purchased at concert performances. In October 2014, the group released their first album together, entitled Sometimes it Takes a Mountain. Five months later, that album was followed by a two-DVD live performance release and the release of their second album (a live performance album), Happy Rhythm. Upon release, the DVDs debuted at the top of Billboard's Music Video chart (Sometimes it Takes a Mountain at #1 and Happy Rhythm at #2). In August 2016, the group's album Better Together was released.

In March 2017, it was announced that Phelps would be once again leaving the group on April 1, and Reggie Smith would join the group as tenor. In October of the following year, this lineup released their first studio album, entitled We Have This Moment. This lineup is still active as of 2026. In October 2018, there was another Gaither Vocal Band Reunion. It was a two-day concert, recorded live. Except for Green, all of the past and present members who were at the first reunion performed. A live album for these concerts titled Reunion Live was released the following year.

In April 2020, McSpadden died in Tulsa, Oklahoma, while recovering from pancreatic cancer, since earlier that year. Later, that same year in May, Pierce died, while recovering from heart surgery. Another live album for the 2018 reunion concerts, titled Reunited Live, was released in 2020, which was also a tribute to McSpadden.

In May 2025, Hampton celebrated 20 years with the Vocal Band on Family Fest 2025.

== Members ==
=== Lineups ===
1980–1982 (as the New Gaither Vocal Band)	1982–1983	1983–1985
Steve Green – Tenor; Gary McSpadden – Lead; Bill Gaither – Baritone; Lee Young – Bass	Steve Green – Tenor; Gary McSpadden – Lead; Bill Gaither – Baritone; Jon Mohr – Bass	Larnelle Harris – Tenor; Gary McSpadden – Lead; Bill Gaither – Baritone; Jon Mohr – Bass
1985–1987 (now simply the Gaither Vocal Band)	1987	1987–1988
Larnelle Harris – Tenor; Michael English – Lead; Gary McSpadden – Baritone; Bill Gaither – Bass	Lemuel Miller – Tenor; Michael English – Lead; Gary McSpadden – Baritone; Bill Gaither – Bass	Jim Murray – Tenor; Michael English – Lead; Gary McSpadden – Baritone; Bill Gaither – Bass
1988–1992	1992–1994	1994
Jim Murray – Tenor; Michael English – Lead; Mark Lowry – Baritone; Bill Gaither – Bass	Terry Franklin – Tenor; Michael English – Lead; Mark Lowry – Baritone; Bill Gaither – Bass	Terry Franklin – Tenor; Buddy Mullins – Lead; Mark Lowry – Baritone; Bill Gaither – Bass
1994–1995	1995–1997	1997–2001
Jonathan Pierce – Tenor; Buddy Mullins – Lead; Mark Lowry – Baritone; Bill Gaither – Bass	Jonathan Pierce – Tenor; Guy Penrod – Lead; Mark Lowry – Baritone; Bill Gaither – Bass	David Phelps – Tenor; Guy Penrod – Lead; Mark Lowry – Baritone; Bill Gaither – Bass
2001–2004	2004–2005	2005–2009
David Phelps – Tenor; Guy Penrod – Lead; Russ Taff – Baritone; Bill Gaither – Bass	David Phelps – Tenor; Guy Penrod – Lead; Marshall Hall – Baritone; Bill Gaither – Bass	Wes Hampton – Tenor; Guy Penrod – Lead; Marshall Hall – Baritone; Bill Gaither – Bass
2009–2014	2014–2017	2017–present
Wes Hampton – 1st Tenor; David Phelps – 2nd Tenor; Michael English – Lead; Mark Lowry – Baritone; Bill Gaither – Bass	Wes Hampton – 1st Tenor; David Phelps – 2nd Tenor; Adam Crabb – Lead; Todd Suttles – Baritone/Bass; Bill Gaither – Bass/Baritone	Wes Hampton – 1st Tenor; Reggie Smith – 2nd Tenor; Adam Crabb – Lead; Todd Suttles – Baritone/Bass; Bill Gaither – Bass/Baritone

=== Current Members ===
- Bill Gaither (1980–present)
- Wes Hampton (2005–present)
- Adam Crabb (2014–present)
- Todd Suttles (2014–present)
- Reggie Smith (2017–present)

=== Former Members ===
- Lee Young (1980–1982)
- Steve Green (1980–1983)
- Gary McSpadden (1980–1988) (d. 2020)
- Jon Mohr (1982–1985)
- Larnelle Harris (1983–1987)
- Michael English (1985–1994), (2009–2014)
- Lemuel Miller (1987)
- Jim Murray (1987–1992)
- Mark Lowry (1988–2001), (2009–2014)
- Terry Franklin (1992–1994)
- Buddy Mullins (1994–1995)
- Jonathan Pierce (1994–1997) (d. 2020)
- Guy Penrod (1995–2009)
- David Phelps (1997–2005), (2009–2017)
- Russ Taff (2001–2004)
- Marshall Hall (2004–2009)

=== Musicians ===
- Piano
  - Anthony Burger (1993–2006) (d. 2006)
  - Gordon Mote (2006–2012) (also sang)
  - Matthew Holt (2012–present)
- Bass guitar
  - Wesley Pritchard (2006–2012, 2018 reunion live)
  - Woody Wright (2023–present)
- Drums
  - Mike Hopper (1998–2003)
  - Greg Ritchie (2003–2022)
  - Michael Rowsey (2022–present)
- Guitar
  - Kevin Williams (1993–present) (also Bass guitar)

=== Special Guests ===
- Gene McDonald

== Awards and nominations ==
=== Grammy Awards ===
Year	Category	Nominated work	Result
1991	Southern Gospel, Country Gospel or Bluegrass Gospel Album	Homecoming	Won
1994	Southern Gospel, Country Gospel or Bluegrass Gospel Album	Southern Classics	Nominated
1998	Southern Gospel, Country Gospel or Bluegrass Gospel Album	Back Home in Indiana	Nominated
2003	Southern Gospel, Country Gospel or Bluegrass Gospel Album	Everything Good	Nominated
2004	Southern Gospel, Country Gospel or Bluegrass Gospel Album	A Cappella	Nominated
2007	Southern Gospel, Country Gospel or Bluegrass Gospel Album	Give It Away	Nominated
2009	Southern Gospel, Country Gospel or Bluegrass Gospel Album	Lovin' Life	Won
2015	Best Roots Gospel Album	Hymns	Nominated
2017	Best Roots Gospel Album	Better Together	Nominated
2022	Best Roots Gospel Album	That’s Gospel, Brother	Nominated
2023	Best Roots Gospel Album	Let’s Just Praise the Lord	Nominated
2024	Best Roots Gospel Album	Shine: The Darker the Night, The Brighter the Light	Nominated

=== GMA Dove Awards ===
Year	Category	Nominated work	Result
1992	Southern Gospel Album	Homecoming	Won
1994	Southern Gospel Album	Southern Classics	Won
1994	Southern Gospel Song	"Satisfied"	Won
1995	Southern Gospel Song	"I Bowed on My Knees"	Won
1999	Southern Gospel Album	Still the Greatest Story Ever Told	Won
1999	Southern Gospel Performance	"I Believe in a Hill Called Mount Calvary"	Won
2000	Southern Gospel Album	God Is Good	Won
2001	Southern Gospel Song	"God Is Good All the Time"	Won
2001	Southern Gospel Album	I Do Believe	Won
2002	Southern Gospel Song	"He's Watching Me"	Won
2003	Southern Gospel Song	"More Than Ever"	Nominated
2003	Country Album	Everything Good	Nominated
2007	Southern Gospel Song	"Give It Away"	Won
2007	Southern Gospel Album	Give It Away	Won
2009	Southern Gospel Album	Lovin' Life	Won
2009	Christmas Album	Christmas Gaither Vocal Band Style	Nominated
2010	Southern Gospel Album	Reunited	Won
2010	Southern Gospel Album	Greatly Blessed	Won
2010	Song of the Year	"Greatly Blessed, Highly Favored"	Nominated
2011	Southern Gospel Song	"Better Day"	Won
2013	Southern Gospel Performance	"Glorious Freedom"	Nominated
2013	Bluegrass Song	"Come to Jesus"	Nominated
2013	Southern Gospel Album	Pure and Simple	Won
2015	Southern Gospel Artist of the Year	Gaither Vocal Band	Won
2017	Southern Gospel Artist of the Year	Gaither Vocal Band	Won
2018	Southern Gospel Artist of the Year	Gaither Vocal Band	Won
2019	Southern Gospel Artist of the Year	Gaither Vocal Band	Won
2022	Southern Gospel Recorded Song of the Year	My Feet Are on the Rock	Won
