= Lani =

Lani is a given name. Notable people with the name include:

== Given name ==
- Lani Aisida (born 1984), Nigerian filmmaker
- Lani Belcher (born 1989), British canoeist
- Lani Billard (born 1979), Canadian actress and singer
- Lani Brockman (born 1956), American theater actress and director
- Lani Cabrera (born 1993), Barbadian swimmer
- Lani Cayetano (born 1982), Filipino politician and mayor
- Lani Daniels (born 1988), New Zealand Professional female boxer
- Lani Doherty (born 1993), American surfer
- Lani Forbes (1987–2022), American author of young adult novels
- Lani Groves (born 1989), South African musician
- Lani Guinier (1950–2022), American civil rights activist
- Lani Hall (born 1945), American singer, lyricist and author
- Lani Hanchett (1919–1975), bishop of the Episcopal Diocese of Hawaii
- Lani Jackson, New Zealand stuntwoman
- Lani Ka'ahumanu (born 1943), bisexual and feminist writer and activist
- Lani Kai (1936–1999), Hawaiian singer and actor
- Lani Lazzari, American entrepreneur and businessperson
- Lani Maestro (born 1957), Filipino-Canadian artist
- Lani McIntyre (1904–1951), guitar and steel guitar player
- Lani Mercado (born 1968), Filipino actress-politician
- Lani Minella (born 1950), American voice actress
- Lani Misalucha (born 1972), Filipino singer
- Lani O'Grady (1954–2001), American actress and talent agent
- Lani Pallister (born 2002), Australian swimmer
- Lani Renaldo (born 1995), songwriter, multi-instrumentalist, and blogger
- Lani Smith (1934–2015), organist and church music composer
- Lani Spiessens (born 2008), Belgian gymnast
- Lani Stemmermann, American botanist
- Lani Stephenson (1948–2021), American parasitologist, nutritionist
- Lani Tupu (born 1955), actor
- Lani Wendt Young (born 1973), Samoan-born writer living in New Zealand
- Lani Wittevrongel, Belgian cyclist

== Surname ==
Lani is a surname. Notable people with the surname include:

- Hriday Lani, script and dialogues writer
- Maria Lani (1895–1954), aspiring film actress and artists' model

== Other uses ==
Lani may also refer to:

- Lani (heaven), the Hawaiian word for 'heaven', also used as a given name
- Lani people of Western Papua
- Western Dani language, also known as Lani or Laani, the language spoken by the Lani people
- Län, administrative division in Sweden and Finland, where it is also known as lääni
- Lani (album), a 1983 studio album by singer Lani Hall
- Lani Price, a fictional character from Days of Our Lives
