= Steve Green (singer) =

American singer (born 1956)

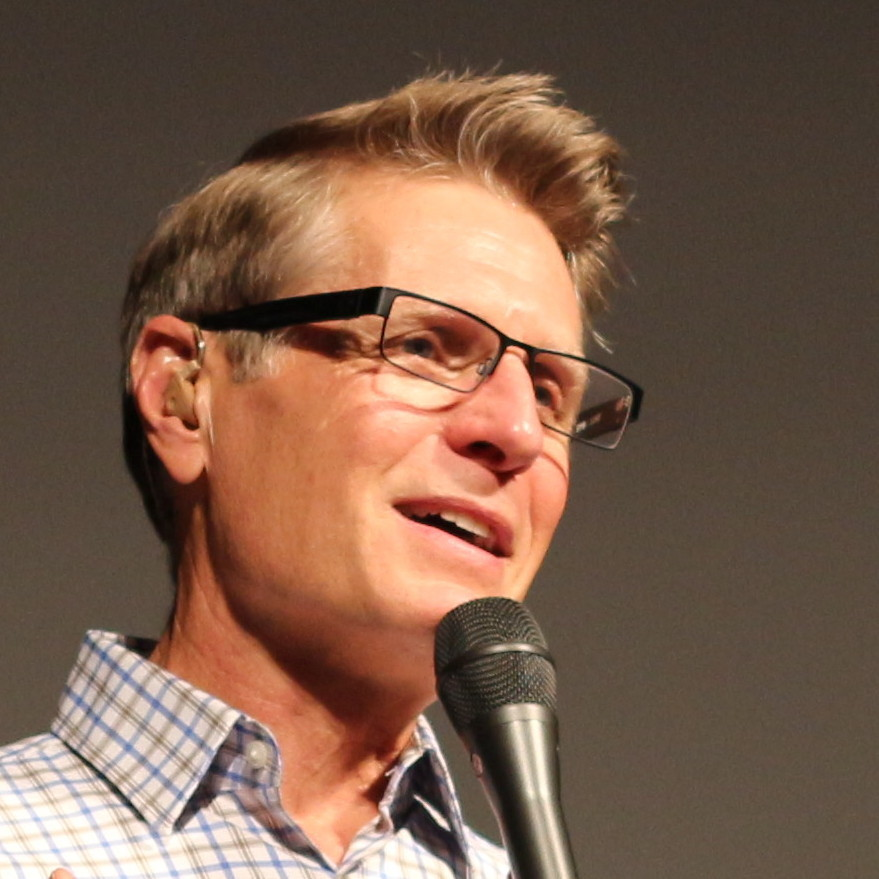
- Green in concert, August 2015

Background information
- Born: August 1, 1956 (age 70); Portland, Oregon, U.S.
- Genres: Contemporary Christian, inspirational
- Occupation: Singer
- Instruments: Vocals, guitar, flute
- Years active: 1974–present
- Labels: Sparrow, Steve Green Ministries Inc.
- Website: stevegreenministries.org

Steve Green (born August 1, 1956) is an American contemporary Christian music singer.

== Early life ==
Green was born in Portland, Oregon, to Charles and Jo Green, who were Baptist missionaries. He spent much of his early life in Argentina and later attended Phoenix Christian High School along with two of his six siblings. He graduated from Phoenix Christian High School in 1974 and, at age 18, enrolled at Grand Canyon University. His intended major was pre-law, but a professor recognized his musical talent and encouraged him to develop it.

== Career ==
After two years at the university, Green left to travel the world with the band Truth. After a two-year stint with Truth (1976–1978), Green married Marijean McCarty, a former member of Truth. They moved to Alexandria, Indiana, to sing backup for the Bill Gaither Trio. In 1980, Green joined Gary McSpadden, Lee Young and Bill Gaither to form the Gaither Vocal Band. Green sang tenor for their first two albums, The New Gaither Vocal Band and Passin' the Faith Along. In 1982, Steve and Gaither's musicians formed the Christian rock band White Heart. Green sang lead for White Heart as they recorded their debut self-titled album (which sold nearly 70,000 copies). In 1983, Steve left White Heart, feeling that his place was not in a rock band. That same year, a confrontation by his brother, Randy, led to a spiritual renewal in Green's life. He signed a solo contract with Sparrow Records, and released his self-titled debut album in 1984. In the same year, he established Steve Green Ministries.

Green's breakout year came in 1985 with the release of He Holds the Keys, which earned him the Dove Award for Male Vocalist of the Year in the Contemporary Christian Music (CCM) category. The following year, 1986, saw the release of two recordings, For God And God Alone and a worship/hymns album titled A Mighty Fortress. In early 1988, he released an album dedicated to his parents, called Find Us Faithful. Green was involved with the Billy Graham Evangelistic Association from the mid-1980s onward. He was one of the first artists to be involved with Promise Keepers, performing at their inaugural event at Folsom Field in Boulder, Colorado, in July 1993 before 50,000 men. His song "Answer the Call" was inspired by the event, and another song, "O Men of God Arise", embodies the Promise Keepers message. Green recorded The Mission in 1989 and We Believe in 1991. He released an album of hymns in 1992. His 1994 album Where Mercy Begins featured more of a pop sound.

In 2005 Green released a new album, Somewhere Between, which leaned toward an art song style. The album featured fewer declarative answers than Green's past work, and instead explored questions of pain, doubt and loss that life inevitably rains down on both the just and the unjust. Green co-wrote half of the songs on the album. In 2007 Green released his last non-compilation album under the Sparrow label, Always: Songs of Worship. In 2010, Green released Love Will Find a Way, his first release through Steve Green Ministries. The album featured David Phelps and Wes Hampton on the track "God is Love". In 2012, Green released two albums, Rest in the Wonder and Christmas. Green stated, "Rest in the Wonder is a declaration of absolute trust in God, fiercely holding to what we know for certain and reverently worshiping the One whose ways are higher than our ways and whose thoughts are higher than our thoughts."

Green released two more albums in 2014, Hide the Word: Bible Songs for Kids and Hymns. Regarding his Hymns project, Green said, "In every age, the church has lifted her voice to express praise and adoration, but the church has also used singing to refute dangerous heresy and remind one another of the foundational Biblical truths."

Green released another English album, Hold Fast, in 2018. Of this album Green says, “I don’t think it’s like anything I’ve done.” It features the reading of one Psalm, the singing of full portions of multiple Psalms, an organ and orchestra, and several songs written by Green himself.

Green has been nominated for a Grammy Award four times. He has also won seven Dove Awards and was inducted into the Gospel Music Hall of Fame in 2017. His website states he has sold over three million albums. His bilingual abilities have seen the release of seven Spanish CDs in the United States, including El Descanso, in 2019.

== Personal life ==
Steve Green married Marijean McCarty, a former member of the Christian ensemble Truth, in 1976. They have two children, Summer (Mark) and Josiah (Jamie-Lee), and six grandchildren.

== Discography ==
=== As group member ===
- 1977: Truth on the Road – Live Double Album Truth
- 1977: Not Just a Coincidence – Truth
- 1978: Departure – Truth
- 1980: David T. Clydesdale Presents Imagination - Milk & Honey MH1018
- 1981: The New Gaither Vocal Band – The New Gaither Vocal Band
- 1982: White Heart – White Heart
- 1983: Passin' the Faith Along – The New Gaither Vocal Band

=== Solo albums ===
- 1984: Steve Green
- 1985: He Holds the Keys
- 1986: For God and God Alone
- 1987: Joy To The World
- 1988: Find Us Faithful
- 1989: The Mission
- 1990: Toma La Cruz
- 1990: Hide 'Em In Your Heart: Bible Memory Melodies, Vol. 1
- 1991: We Believe
- 1992: Hide 'Em In Your Heart: Bible Memory Melodies, vol. 2
- 1992: Hymns: A Portrait of Christ
- 1992: Himnos: Un Retrato De Cristo
- 1994: Where Mercy Begins
- 1994: People Need the Lord
- 1994: 16 Melodías Bíblicas Para Niños
- 1994: ¡En Vivo!
- 1996: The Letter
- 1996: The Early Years
- 1996: The First Noel
- 1998: The Faithful
- 1998: Hide 'Em In Your Heart: Praise & Worship for Kids
- 1999: Morning Light: Songs To Awaken the Dawn
- 2002: Woven in Time
- 2003: 8 Great Hits
- 2004: Yo Iré
- 2004: The Adventures of Sir Bernard The Good Knight
- 2005: Somewhere Between
- 2006: The Ultimate Collection
- 2007: Always: Songs of Worship
- 2010: Love Will Find a Way
- 2012: Rest in the Wonder
- 2012: People Need the Lord: Number Ones
- 2012: Christmas
- 2014: Hide the Word: Bible Memory Melodies
- 2014: Hymns
- 2015: 20th Century Masters - The Millennium Collection: The Best of Steve Green
- 2018: Hold Fast
- 2025: Ocean of Hope

=== Appearances on other albums ===
- 1979: Jesus Lives...Forever! An Easter Cantata by Eugene McCammon, conducted by David T. Clydesdale
- 1980: Imagination – orchestrated and written by David T. Clydesdale
- 1980: Call Him Jesus: a choral celebration for Christmas by Robert J Hughes and Lani Smith
- 1981: Love Overflowing – Sandi Patty (background vocals)
- 1981: Beyond Imagination – orchestrated and written by David T. Clydesdale
- 1981: The Reason for the Season – various artists; duet with Sandi Patty on "No Room Today"
- 1981: This Holy Child: a Christmas choral celebration – musical by Lani Smith
- 1982: The Master's Music – various artists; "Spirit song", "New song" and "Pieces"
- 1982: Thou Shall Call His Name...Jesus – various artists; "Shepherd's Song"
- 1982: Joseph, the Carpenter – various artists; "Tiny Little Baby"
- 1983: More than Wonderful – Sandi Patty (background)
- 1983: On the Rock: a musical odyssey on Kingdom living based on the Sermon on the Mount – orchestrated and written by David T. Clydesdale
- 1983: We are Called – Steve Fry "Praise Him In the Sanctuary (Medley)"
- 1984: Vital Signs – White Heart (background vocals on "Let your First Thought Be Love" and "We Are His Hands")
- 1984: Songs from the Heart – Sandi Patty (background)
- 1984: The Sounds of His Love – Listen...To Christmas! - Don Marsh and Karen Dean; duet with Donna McElroy on "Ten Thousand Joys"
- 1984: The Gift Goes On – Sandi Patty (background)
- 1985: 25 Songs of Christmas, Vol. 2 – various artists; "O Holy Night"
- 1985: Together We Will Stand – Continental Singers and various artists; "You're the Only Jesus"
- 1985: Hotline – White Heart (background vocals on "Gotta Be A Believer" and "Turn the Page")
- 1986: Morning Like This – Sandi Patty (background)
- 1986: Jesus My Friend Unfailing – highlights from a Billy Graham Crusade; "Lift up a Song"
- 1987: The Father Hath Provided – Larnelle Harris (trio with Larnelle Harris and Sandi Patty on the song Seekers of Your Heart)
- 1990: Love Overflowing – Sandi Patty (background)
- 1990: Carols by Candlelight – by John Randall Dennis; "Thou Who Wast Rich"
- 1991: More than Wonderful – Sandi Patty (background)
- 1991: Silver celebration: A Tribute to Bill & Gloria Gaither – various artists; "There's Something about That Name"
- 1992: No Compromise: Remembering the Music of Keith Green – various artists; "Grace by Which I Stand"
- 1992: The Word: Recapturing the Imagination – Michael Card (background)
- 1993: New Young Messiah – various artists; "I Know That My Redeemer Liveth"
- 1993: Coram Deo II – various artists; "Rejoice in Jesus" and "In Spirit and in Truth"
- 1994: Saviour: Story of God's Passion for His People (with Larnelle Harris, Twila Paris, Wayne Watson, Wintley Phipps)
- 1995: Inspirational Homecoming: A Tribute to the Gaither Legacy – various artists; "I Can See (On the Emmaus Road)"
- 1995: Christmas Carols of the Young Messiah – various artists; "Joy to the World"
- 1995: Hymns & Voices – various artists; "All Creatures of Our God and King" and "Old Rugged Cross"
- 1995: Wedding Album – various artists; "Household of Faith"
- 1996: Live Worship – Promise Keepers – Promise Keepers "A Mighty Fortress Is Our God"
- 1997: Unveiled Hope – Michael Card; duet with Michael Card on "Holy, Holy, Holy"
- 1997: Israel – various artists; "Canta Canta"
- 1998: Experiencing God – various artists; "Calvary Is the Sea"
- 1998: Almighty God – various artists; "Seekers of Your Heart"
- 1999: If My People Pray – various artists; "I Am in God's Hands"
- 1999: 32 Great Hymns of the Faith – various artists; "What Wondrous Love Is This"
- 1999: Listen to Our Hearts, Vol.2 – various artists; "Say the Name"
- 1999: White Heart - Demos, Interviews, and Lost Songs – White Heart; "You Loved Me Still the Same" & "If Only For One Night"
- 1999: Adore Him – various artists; (Narrator)
- 1999: McCaughey Septuplets: Sweet Dreams – various artists; "Goodnight Emily"
- 2000: Word & Song Collection – various artists; (Narrator)
- 2002: Hallelujah!: The Very Best of the Brooklyn Tabernacle Choir
- 2002: Scribbling in the Sand - Michael Card; duet with Michael Card on "Immanuuel"
- 2009: Gaither Vocal Band Reunion Vol 1 – "He Came Down to My Level", "No Other Name But Jesus", and "A Few Good Men"
- 2009: Gaither Vocal Band Reunion Vol 2 – "Passin' the Faith Along" and "Find Us Faithful"
- 2010: My Cry Ascends: New Parish Psalms (various artists, Gregory Wilbur, composer)
- 2011: A Man Like Me – Wes Hampton; duet on "It Is Well with My Soul"
- 2012: Larnelle: Live In Nashville!; Three Tenors: "Kings of the Earth" and "It Is Well" with Larnelle Harris and Steve Amerson
- 2014: Out on a Limb – Wes Hampton; trio with Hampton and David Phelps on "Echo of You"
- 2015: Psalms Hymns and Spiritual Songs – Michael O'Brien; duet with Michael O'Brien on "For All the Saints"
- 2015: Free – Paul Turner; duet with Paul Turner on "Jesus My Strength"

== Video ==
- 1986: God and God Alone VHS: Live In Concert
- 1991: Hide 'Em In Your Heart: 13 Bible Memory Music Videos for Children of All Ages
- 1992: Hymns: A Portrait of Christ (Sparrow)
- 1992: What My Parents Did Right
- 1994: Live! The Young Messiah
- 1996: Live Worship – Promise Keepers VHS – Promise Keepers "A Mighty Fortress Is Our God"
- 1998: The Faithful
- 2002: Steve Green: Life Story – The Journey to a Life Message
- 2008: A Journey of Faith (Live)
- 2009: Gaither Vocal Band Reunion Vol 1 and 2
- 2012: Larnelle: Live In Nashville! DVD; Three Tenors – "Kings of the Earth" and "It Is Well" with Larnelle Harris and Steve Amerson
- 2016: Saviour: The Story of God's Passion for His People (Recorded live at Gateway Church)
