= Lani Stephenson =

American scientist (1948–2021)

- Born: July 31, 1948; Honolulu, Hawai'i
- Died: March 10, 2021 (aged 72); Ithaca, New York
- Occupations: Nutritionist, parasitologist
- Years active: 1980 to 2000

Lani Sue Stephenson (July 31, 1948 – March 10, 2021) was an American parasitologist and nutritionist, "a pioneer in field-based studies on nutrition–parasite interactions".

== Early life ==
Stephenson was born in Honolulu, Hawai'i, the daughter of Russell V. Stephenson Jr. and Joan Stephenson. Her father was the music director at the Punahou School. At Cornell University, she earned a bachelor's degree in 1971, a master's in 1973, and PhD in 1978, all in the human nutrition program. Her dissertation involved a study of ascariasis, a human parasitic infection that causes malnutrition.

== Career ==
Stephenson remained at Cornell University a researcher in the Division of Nutritional Sciences, and later as associate professor. She was also a visiting professor at the Danish Centre for Experimental Parasitology. Much of her research was based in Kenya, where she collaborated with her husband on studies of intestinal parasites and malnutrition in children, and on interventions to prevent or treat schistosomiasis, filariasis, and malaria. She retired from Cornell in 2000.

== Publications ==
Stephenson's research was published in scholarly journals including Parasitology, Experimental Parasitology, The American Journal of Clinical Nutrition, The American Journal of Tropical Medicine and Hygiene,Transactions of the Royal Society of Tropical Medicine and Hygiene, World Health Forum, Journal of Tropical Pediatrics, Social Science & Medicine, Nutritional Reviews, Journal of the American Dietetic Association, Paediatric Drugs, and the Journal of Nutrition. Some of her solo-authored papers and monographs include:

- "The contribution of Ascaris lumbricoides to malnutrition in children" (1980)
- "Evaluation of a four year project to control ascaris infection in children in two Kenyan villages" (1983)
- "Methods to evaluate nutritional and economic implications of ascaris infection" (1984)
- Schistosomiasis and Malnutrition (1986)
- "Helminth Parasites, a Major Factor in Malnutrition" (1994)
- "Possible New Developments in Community Control of Iron-Deficiency Anemia" (1995)
- "Optimising the Benefits of Anthelmintic Treatment in Children" (2001)
- "Pathophysiology of Intestinal Nematodes" (2002)

== Personal life ==
Stephenson married a fellow Cornell nutritionist, Michael C. Latham in 1974, as his second wife. He died in 2011. She died in Newfield, New York in 2021, aged 72 years.
