= Carl Leopold =

Carl Leopold may refer to:

- A. Carl Leopold (1919–2009), American academic and plant physiologist
- Carl Gustaf af Leopold (1756–1829), Swedish poet
