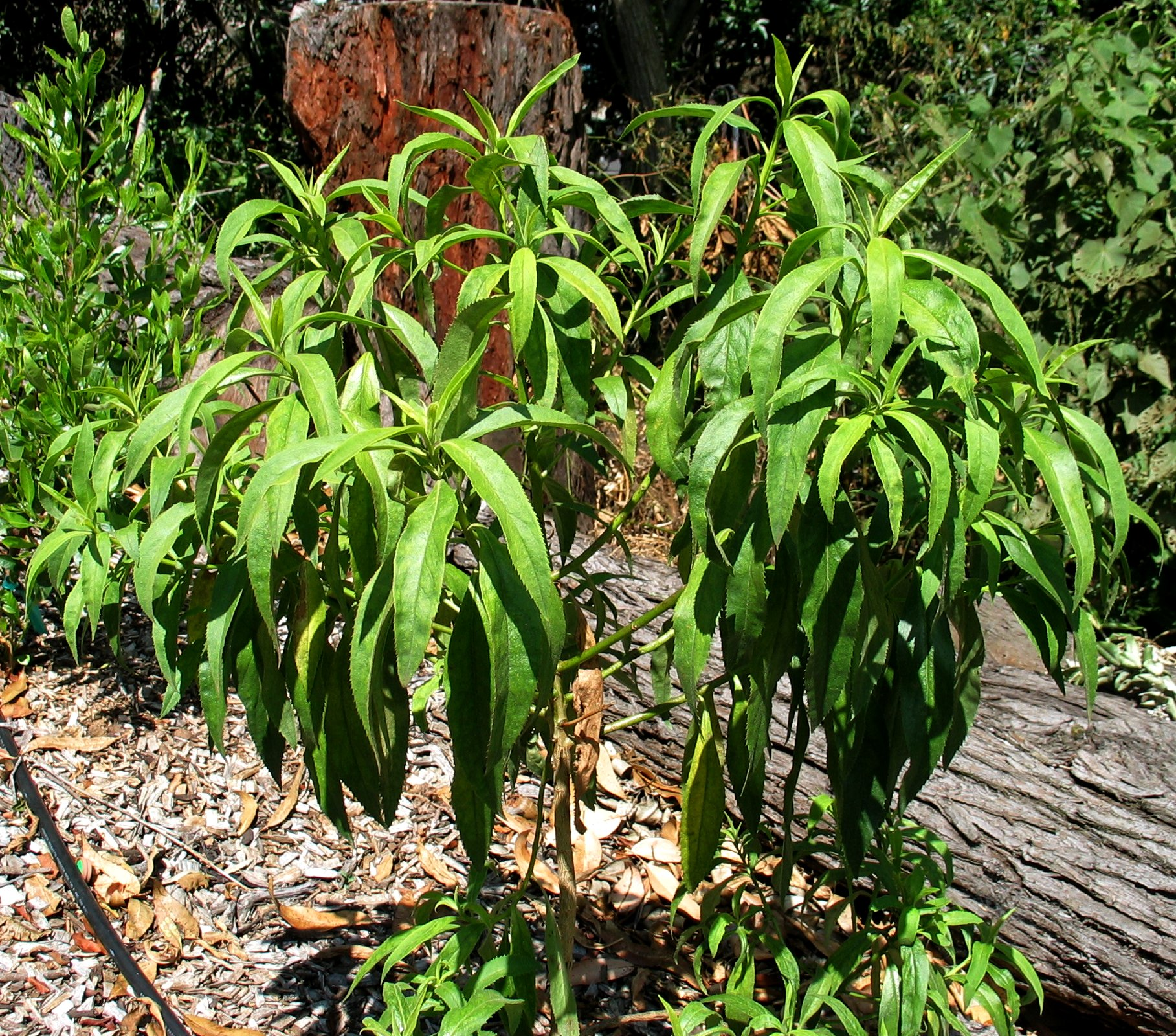

Conservation status
- Critically Imperiled (NatureServe)

Scientific classification
- Kingdom: Plantae
- Clade: Tracheophytes
- Clade: Angiosperms
- Clade: Eudicots
- Order: Caryophyllales
- Family: Caryophyllaceae
- Genus: Silene
- Species: S. lanceolata

Binomial name
- Silene lanceolata A.Gray

= Silene lanceolata =

Species of flowering plant

Silene lanceolata is a rare species of flowering plant in the family Caryophyllaceae known by the common names Kauai catchfly and lanceolate catchfly. It is endemic to Hawaii, where it is known only from Oahu, Molokai, and Hawaii, having been extirpated from Kauai and Lanai. It is threatened by the degradation of its habitat and it is a federally listed endangered species of the United States.

This subshrub grows 15 to 50 centimeters tall and bears white flowers. It grows on the lava and ash substrates of the volcanoes of the island of Hawaii. It grows in dry and moist forests on cliffs and slopes on Oahu and Molokai. Most known populations occur at the Pohakuloa Training Area on Hawaii, for a total of just over 10,000 individuals. There are four populations on Oahu. There are fewer than 1000 individuals on Molokai.

Threats to the plant include fire in some areas. Fire also fosters the takeover of invasive plant species such as Pennisetum setaceum (fountain grass), which displaces native plants; the flammable fountain grass then increases the likelihood of more fire. Feral goats and pigs cause destruction in the habitat. The plant faces competition from other species of non-native plants on the islands.
