= Penn Forest Natural Burial Park =

- Interactive map of Penn Forest Natural Burial Park

Details
- Established: 2011
- Location: Penn Hills, Pennsylvania
- Coordinates: 40.511°N 79.823°W
- Type: Natural burial cemetery
- Owned by: Land Conservation Cemeteries, LLC
- Size: 31 acres
- No. of graves: Over 400
- Website: www.pennforestcemetery.com
- Find a Grave: Penn Forest Natural Burial Park

Penn Forest Natural Burial Park is a 31-acre natural burial cemetery and nature preserve located in Penn Hills, Pennsylvania, 13 miles northeast of downtown Pittsburgh. Established in 2011, it is Pennsylvania's first and only exclusively natural burial ground certified by the Green Burial Council (GBC).

Unlike conventional cemeteries, Penn Forest and other GBC certified cemeteries do not allow embalming, concrete vaults, or non-biodegradable caskets. The park operates with a dual mission of providing sustainable death care and restoring the local ecosystem through reforestation and native landscaping.

== History ==
The park was founded by Pete McQuillin and Nancy Chubb, who established the non-profit Green Burial Pittsburgh in 2008 to educate the public on eco-friendly funeral options. Inspired by their own desire for natural burial, and by researching some of the first natural burial cemeteries such as Greensprings Natural Cemetery Preserve, the couple sought a location in the Pittsburgh area that could remain protected from suburban development.

The land, historically known as "The Farm," was an active agricultural site from the mid-1800s until the 1950s. It later served as a retreat for a Catholic order before being purchased by McQuillin and Chubb in 2010. After obtaining zoning approval and a state license, the cemetery performed its first interment in 2011. In 2012, it became the first site in Pennsylvania to meet the Green Burial Council’s standards for a "Natural Burial Ground," which includes a permanent deed restriction to ensure the land remains a cemetery in perpetuity. Upon opening it was reported to be only the 14th natural burial cemetery in the country. As of January 2026, there are now over 400 interred at the site.

== Grounds and Facilities ==
The 31-acre property consists of rolling hills, meadowland, and forest, bordered by Plum Creek.

- Preservation: Ten acres are permanently preserved as a natural wildlife habitat.
- Burial Sections: The grounds are divided into wooded groves and meadows. As of 2024, approximately four acres are actively used for interments, with a long-term master plan to accommodate 10,000 to 15,000 plots.
- Jewish Section: A specific area of the park has been consecrated by a Rabbi for traditional Jewish burials, which align with green burial standards.
- Infrastructure: The site includes a restored 1862 farmhouse that serves as the cemetery office, a "meditation hut" completed in 2023, and a working barn.

== Practices ==
As a GBC-certified natural burial ground, Penn Forest adheres to strict environmental protocols:

- Biodegradable Materials: Only biodegradable caskets (pine, wicker, bamboo) or shrouds (cotton, silk, wool) are permitted. All clothing worn by the deceased must be biodegradable (cotton, linen, wool).
- Prohibitions: The use of formaldehyde-based embalming fluids and outer burial containers, such as concrete vaults or grave liners, is strictly prohibited.
- Memorialization: Upright monuments are not allowed. Graves may be marked with unpolished, locally sourced fieldstones that must lie flush with the earth.
- Maintenance: The grounds are maintained through ecological management, including grazing in some areas by resident sheep and goats to control invasive species.

== See also ==
- Natural burial
- Greensprings Natural Cemetery Preserve
- Green Burial Council
