= Etirinotecan pegol =

Pharmaceutical drug

Clinical data
- Trade names: Onzeald
- Other names: NKTR-102
- Routes of administration: Intravenous infusion
- ATC code: L01CE03 (WHO)

Pharmacokinetic data
- Protein binding: none
- Metabolites: irinotecan and its metabolites
- Elimination half-life: 38 days
- Excretion: mostly via kidneys

Identifiers
- CAS Number: 848779-32-8
- PubChem CID: 56935717
- DrugBank: DB14951
- UNII: LJ16641SFT
- KEGG: D10367

Chemical and physical data
- Formula: C_{153}H_{176}N_{20}O_{36}[C_{8}H_{16}O_{4}]_{n} (n≈113)
- Molar mass: 20,900–24,900 g/mol
- 3D model (JSmol): Interactive image
- SMILES: CCC1=C2CN3C(=CC4=C(C3=O)COC(=O)[C@@]4(CC)OC(=O)CNC(=O)COCCOCC(COCCOCC(=O)NCC(=O)O[C@]5(C6=C(COC5=O)C(=O)N7CC8=C(C9=C(C=CC(=C9)OC(=O)N3CCC(CC3)N3CCCCC3)N=C8C7=C6)CC)CC)(COCCOCC(=O)NCC(=O)O[C@]3(C4=C(COC3=O)C(=O)N3CC5=C(C6=C(C=CC(=C6)OC(=O)N6CCC(CC6)N6CCCCC6)N=C5C3=C4)CC)CC)COCCOCC(=O)NCC(=O)O[C@]3(C4=C(COC3=O)C(=O)N3CC5=C(C6=C(C=CC(=C6)OC(=O)N6CCC(CC6)N6CCCCC6)N=C5C3=C4)CC)CC)C2=NC2=C1C=C(C=C2)OC(=O)N1CCC(CC1)N1CCCCC1
- InChI: InChI=1S/C161H192N20O40/c1-9-105-109-69-101(214-153(198)174-53-37-97(38-54-174)170-45-21-17-22-46-170)29-33-125(109)166-141-113(105)81-178-129(141)73-121-117(145(178)190)85-210-149(194)158(121,13-5)218-137(186)77-162-133(182)89-202-61-65-206-93-157(94-207-66-62-203-90-134(183)163-78-138(187)219-159(14-6)122-74-130-142-114(82-179(130)146(191)118(122)86-211-150(159)195)106(10-2)110-70-102(30-34-126(110)167-142)215-154(199)175-55-39-98(40-56-175)171-47-23-18-24-48-171,95-208-67-63-204-91-135(184)164-79-139(188)220-160(15-7)123-75-131-143-115(83-180(131)147(192)119(123)87-212-151(160)196)107(11-3)111-71-103(31-35-127(111)168-143)216-155(200)176-57-41-99(42-58-176)172-49-25-19-26-50-172)96-209-68-64-205-92-136(185)165-80-140(189)221-161(16-8)124-76-132-144-116(84-181(132)148(193)120(124)88-213-152(161)197)108(12-4)112-72-104(32-36-128(112)169-144)217-156(201)177-59-43-100(44-60-177)173-51-27-20-28-52-173/h29-36,69-76,97-100H,9-28,37-68,77-96H2,1-8H3,(H,162,182)(H,163,183)(H,164,184)(H,165,185)/t158-,159-,160-,161-/m0/s1; Key:SELCJVNOEBVTAC-HLDPIHRNSA-N

Etirinotecan pegol (trade name Onzeald) is a drug developed by Nektar Therapeutics for the treatment of certain kinds of breast cancer with brain metastases. The European Medicines Agency refused to grant it a marketing authorisation in 2017.

It works as a topoisomerase I inhibitor. Chemically, it consists of four units of irinotecan (a topoisomerase I inhibitor in use since the late 1990s) linked by carboxymethyl glycine and polyethylene glycol (PEG) chains to a central pentaerythritol ether, resulting in a much longer biological half-life (38 days) than that of irinotecan. It is formulated as a dihydrochloride and with 1.2 units of trifluoroacetate.
