= Alfred E. Mann =

American businessman (1925–2016)

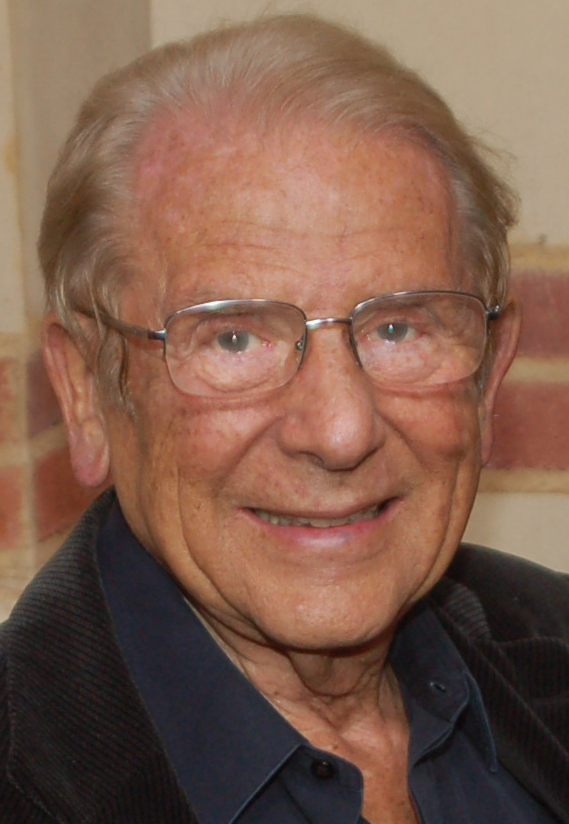
- Born: November 6, 1925; Portland, Oregon
- Died: February 25, 2016 (aged 90); Las Vegas, Nevada
- Education: University of California, Los Angeles (BA '49, MSc '51)
- Occupations: Entrepreneur and philanthropist
- Spouse(s): Beverly Delson (m. 1948) Linda J. Miller (m. 1966) Susan G. Kendall (m. 1978) Claude P. Girault (m. 2004)
- Children: 7
- Military career
- Branch: United States Army Air Forces
- Service years: 1943–1946
- Rank: Lieutenant
- Conflicts: World War II

Alfred Eugene Mann (November 6, 1925 – February 25, 2016) was an American physicist, inventor, entrepreneur, and philanthropist.

== Early life and education ==
Alfred Eugene Mann was born on November 6, 1925 in Portland, Oregon to Charles Emanual Mann and Anna Schnitzer. His father was a grocer who emigrated from England; his mother a pianist and singer who immigrated from Poland.

== Business ==
In 1956, Mann founded Spectrolab, the first of his aerospace companies. While at Spectrolab, an electro optical systems company, he also founded Heliotek, a semiconductor company, that became a major supplier of solar cells for spacecraft. Among other accomplishments during his tenure, Mann's companies provided the electric power for over 100 spacecraft and constructed one of the lunar experiments. Although he sold both companies to Textron in 1960 (merged into one, Spectrolab is now a subsidiary of Boeing Satellite Systems), he continued to manage them until 1972. After he left those companies to found Pacesetter Systems, which focused on cardiac pacemakers, he sold that company in 1985 and managed it until 1992. It is now a part of St. Jude Medical. Mann then went on to establish MiniMed (insulin pumps and continuous glucose devices, now owned by Medtronic) and Advanced Bionics (neuroprosthetics, now focused on cochlear implants and owned by Sonova, while its pain management and other neural stimulation products are now owned by Boston Scientific).

At the time of his death, Mann was involved in several companies, including:

- founder and chairman of Second Sight Medical Products, a biomedical company which produces the Argus retinal prosthesis;
- founder and chairman of Bioness, a company devoted to applying electrostimulation for functional neural defects such as paralysis;
- founder and chairman of the Board of Quallion, LLC, a company producing high reliability batteries for medical products and for the military and aerospace industries;
- Chairman of Stellar Microelectronics, an electronic circuit manufacturer for the medical, military and aerospace industries;
- Mann also chaired the Southern California Biomedical Council (SCBC or SoCalBio), the trade association that has represented and promoted the growth of biotech, medtech and digital health industries in the Greater Los Angeles region.

In June 2014, the US Food and Drug Administration approved MannKind Corporation's application for a unique inhalable insulin (Afrezza) for the treatment of diabetes. Mannkind subsequently licensed the device to a French pharmaceutical company, Sanofi, for US$925 million. Mann was chairman of the board of MannKind Corporation, a biomedical company, and chief executive officer until January 12, 2015. In November 2015, Hakan Edstrom stepped down as CEO and president and remained until July, 2017 to provide other services for the company. Mann again stepped in as interim CEO.

Mann also was on the board of directors and was the largest investor in Eclipse Aviation

Mann was one of the main investors in the development of Mulholland Estates, a gated community in Los Angeles.

== Philanthropy ==
Mann established Alfred E. Mann Institutes for Biomedical Engineering at the University of Southern California (USC), known as AMI/USC ($162 million); at Purdue University known as AMI/Purdue ($100 million); and at the Technion known as AMIT ($104 million) are business incubators for medical device development in preparation for commercialization. The Institutes are essentially fully funded. Three other universities were in late stage discussions as of 2006. AMI was founded in 1998 when Alfred Mann made his first $100 million gift to USC, a major private research university in Los Angeles. The total gifted endowment for AMI/USC is $162 million since then.

The Alfred Mann Foundation for Biomedical Engineering is charged with selecting, establishing and overseeing the institutes, similar to AMI at USC and at other research universities.

Mann was a Life Trustee of the University of Southern California.

Founded in 1985, the Alfred Mann Foundation has several core aims. It aims to work with scientists and research organizations to find bionic solutions for people suffering from debilitating medical impairments.

As an alumnus of UCLA, he tried to make a substantial monetary gift to his alma mater to fund a bioengineering institute. However, the donation failed over Mann's desire to retain control over patents and patent revenues generated by the institute. The $162 million gift eventually went to USC, a private institution that agreed to his terms.

On March 16, 2007, Purdue University received a $100 million endowment from the Mann Foundation for Biomedical Engineering. The endowment was the largest research gift ever at the university and created the Alfred Mann Institute at Purdue. However, AMI Purdue was closed and the unspent portion of the $100 million endowment from the MANN Foundation was rescinded in early 2012.

== Personal life ==
Mann was married four times and had seven children. His first wife was Beverly Mann. They divorced in 1957 His second wife was Linda Mann. They divorced in 1973. His third wife was Susan Kendall; they divorced in 1997. In 2004, he married his fourth wife, Claude Mann.

Mann died on February 25, 2016, of natural causes in Las Vegas, Nevada at the age of 90.

== Recognition ==
- 2000, Golden Plate Award of the American Academy of Achievement
- 2003, Business Journal's Los Angeles Business Person of the Year
- 2011, MDEA Lifetime Achievement Award
