= Newfield Bridge =

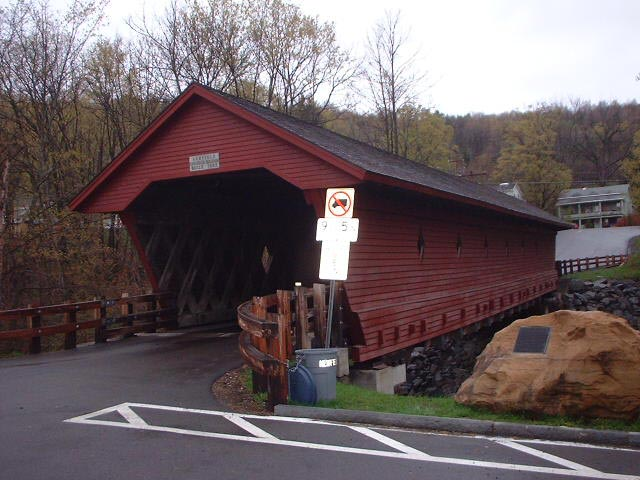
- Newfield Covered Bridge, February 2010
- Coordinates: 42°21′47″N 76°35′28″W
- Crosses: Cayuga Inlet west branch
- Locale: Newfield, New York
- Official name: Newfield Covered Bridge

Characteristics
- Design: Town lattice covered bridge
- Total length: 115 feet (35 m)
- Width: 16 feet (4.9 m)
- Clearance above: 9 feet 5 inches (2.87 m)

History
- Construction start: 1851
- Construction end: 1853
- Newfield Covered Bridge
- U.S. National Register of Historic Places
- Location: Covered Bridge Street, Newfield, New York
- Coordinates: 42°21′47″N 76°35′27″W
- Area: 0 acres (0 ha)
- NRHP reference No.: 00000095
- Added to NRHP: February 25, 2000
- Construction cost: $800

Location
- Interactive map of Newfield Bridge

Newfield Bridge is a wooden covered bridge over the Cayuga Inlet west branch. It is in Newfield, Tompkins County, New York. It is one of 29 covered bridges in New York State and the oldest covered bridge in New York that continues to carry motor vehicle traffic.

It was added to the National Register of Historic Places in 2000.

== Gallery ==
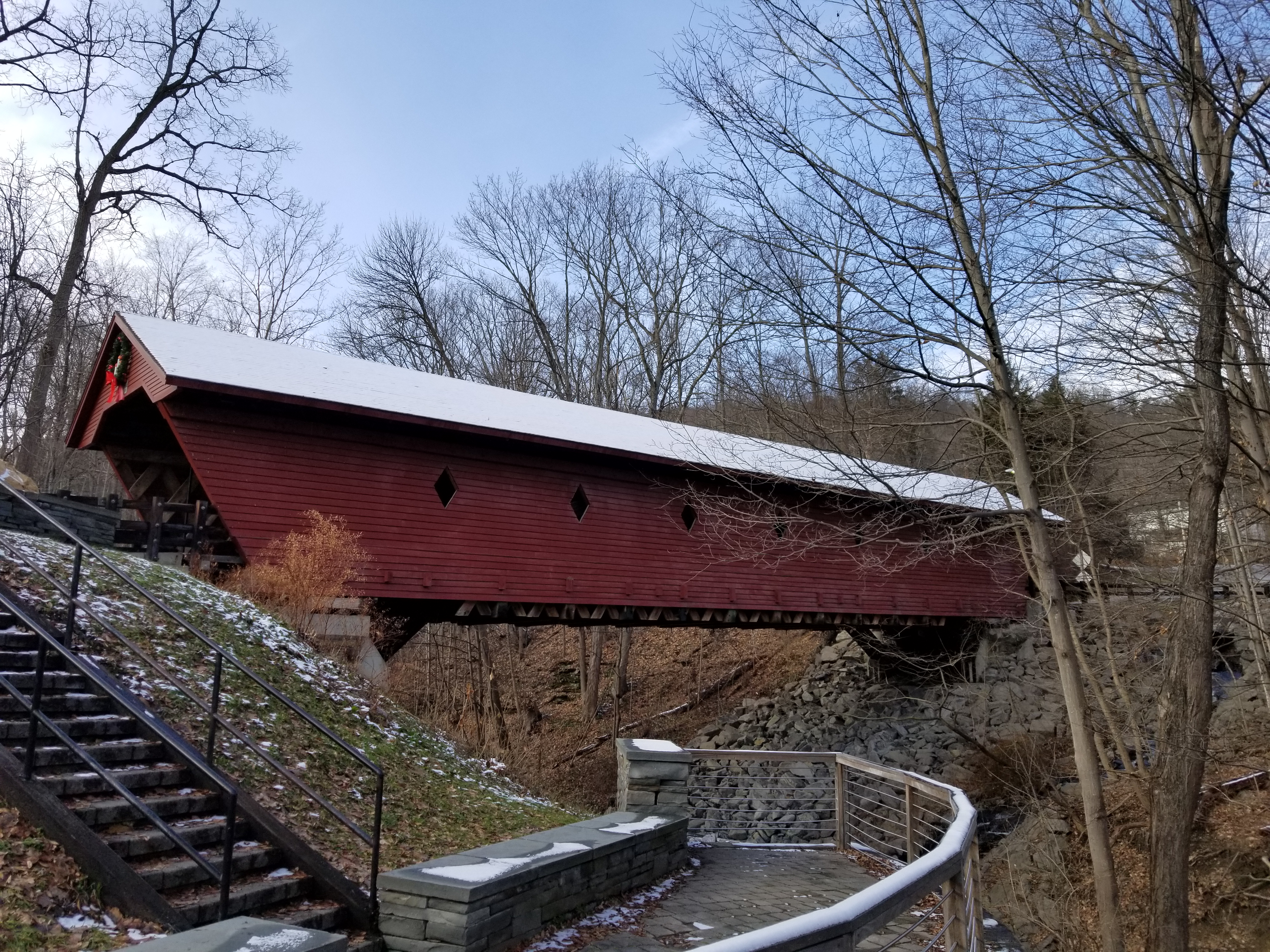
Bridge as viewed from observation deck

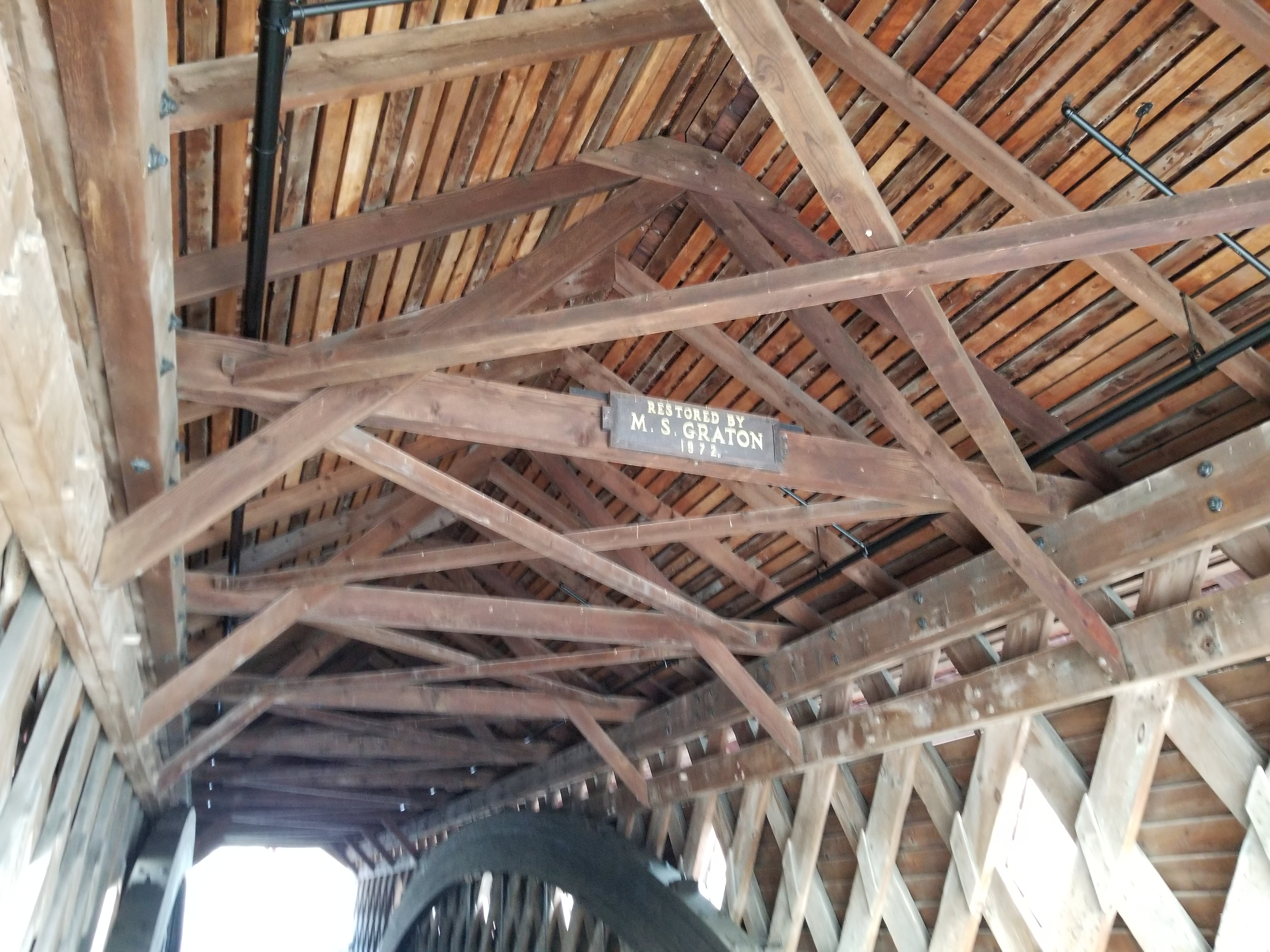
Plaque located inside bridge showing restoration date

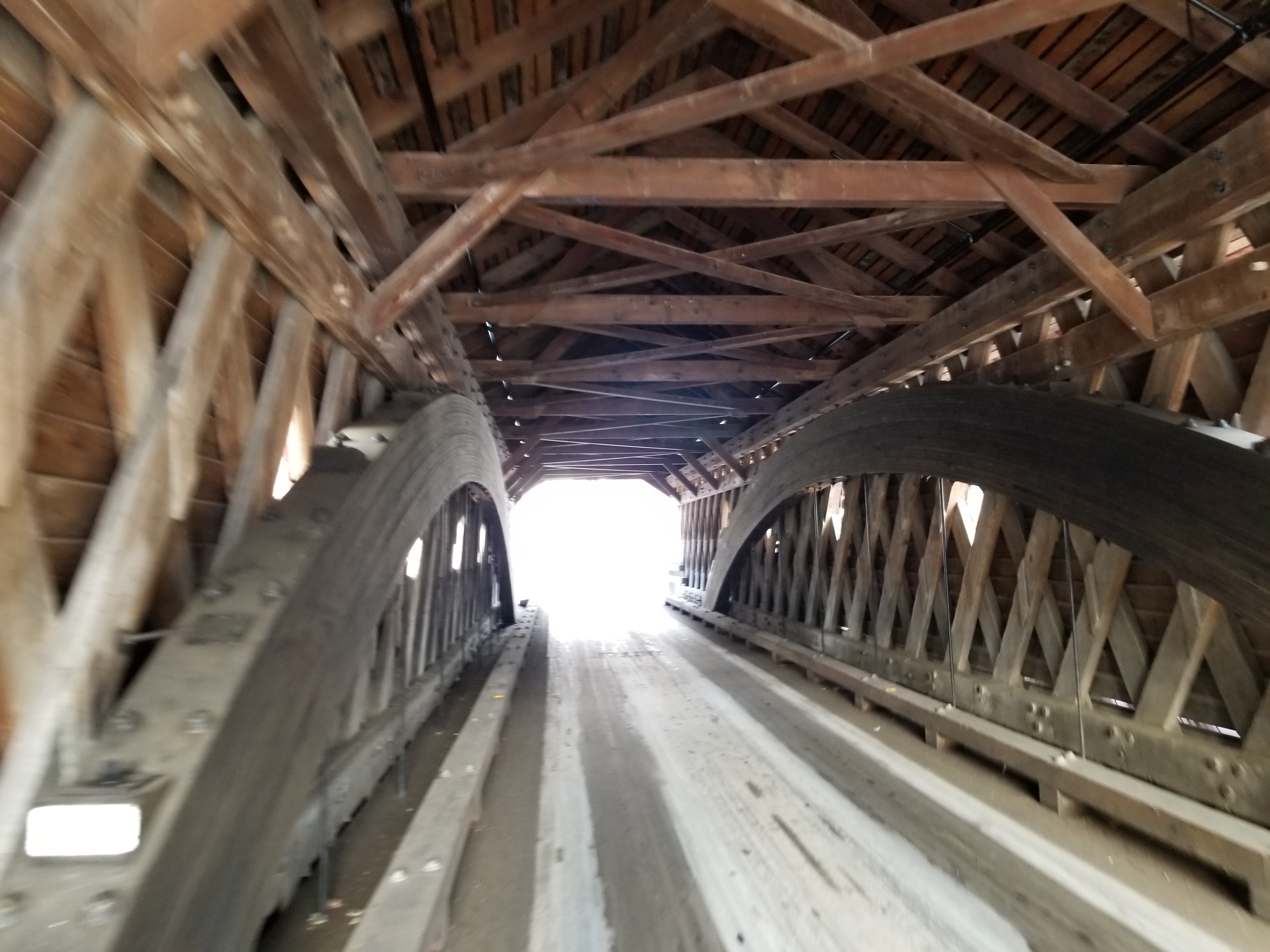
Looking through the bridge, showing the truss and arch structure

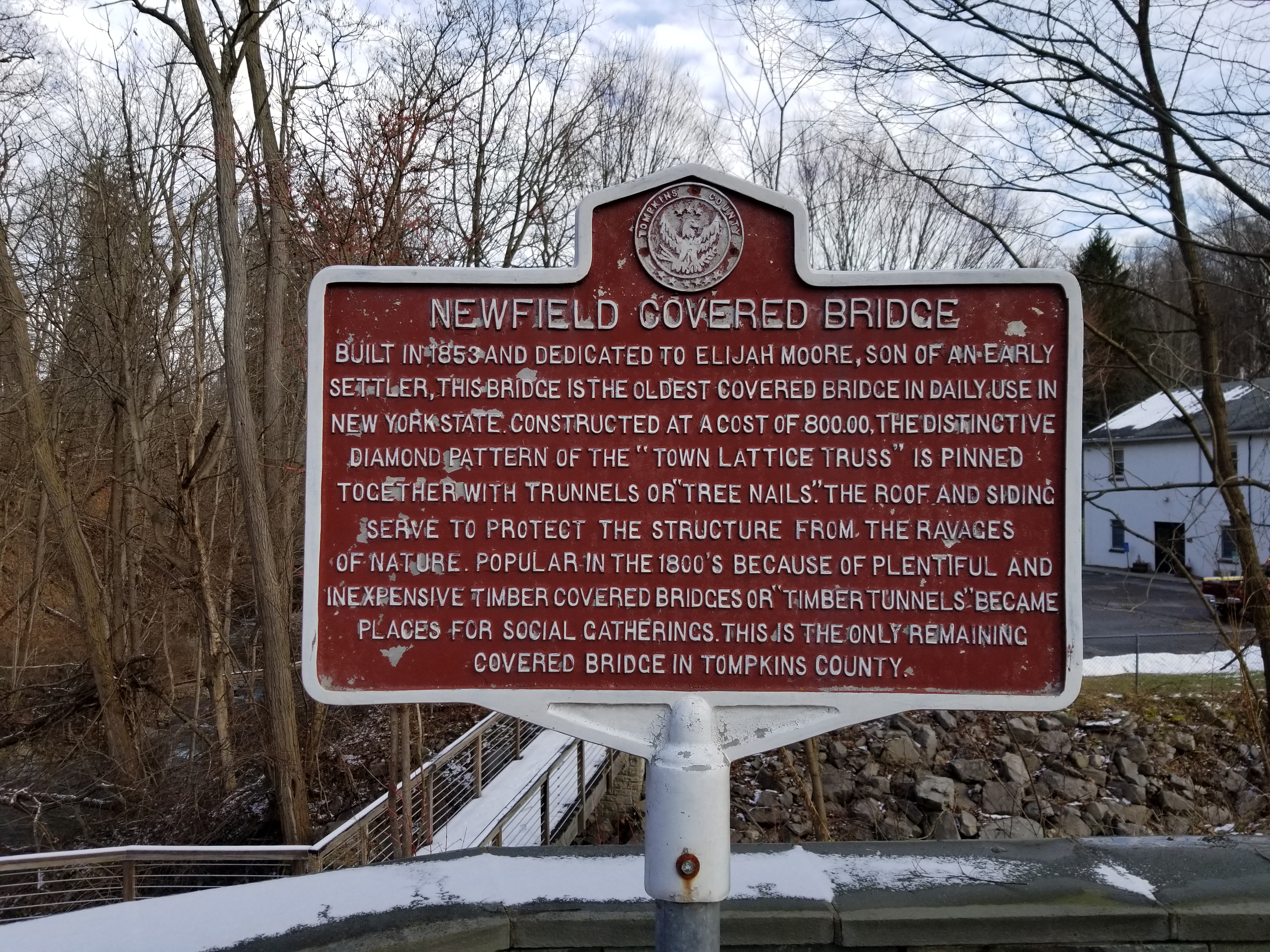
Historic marker

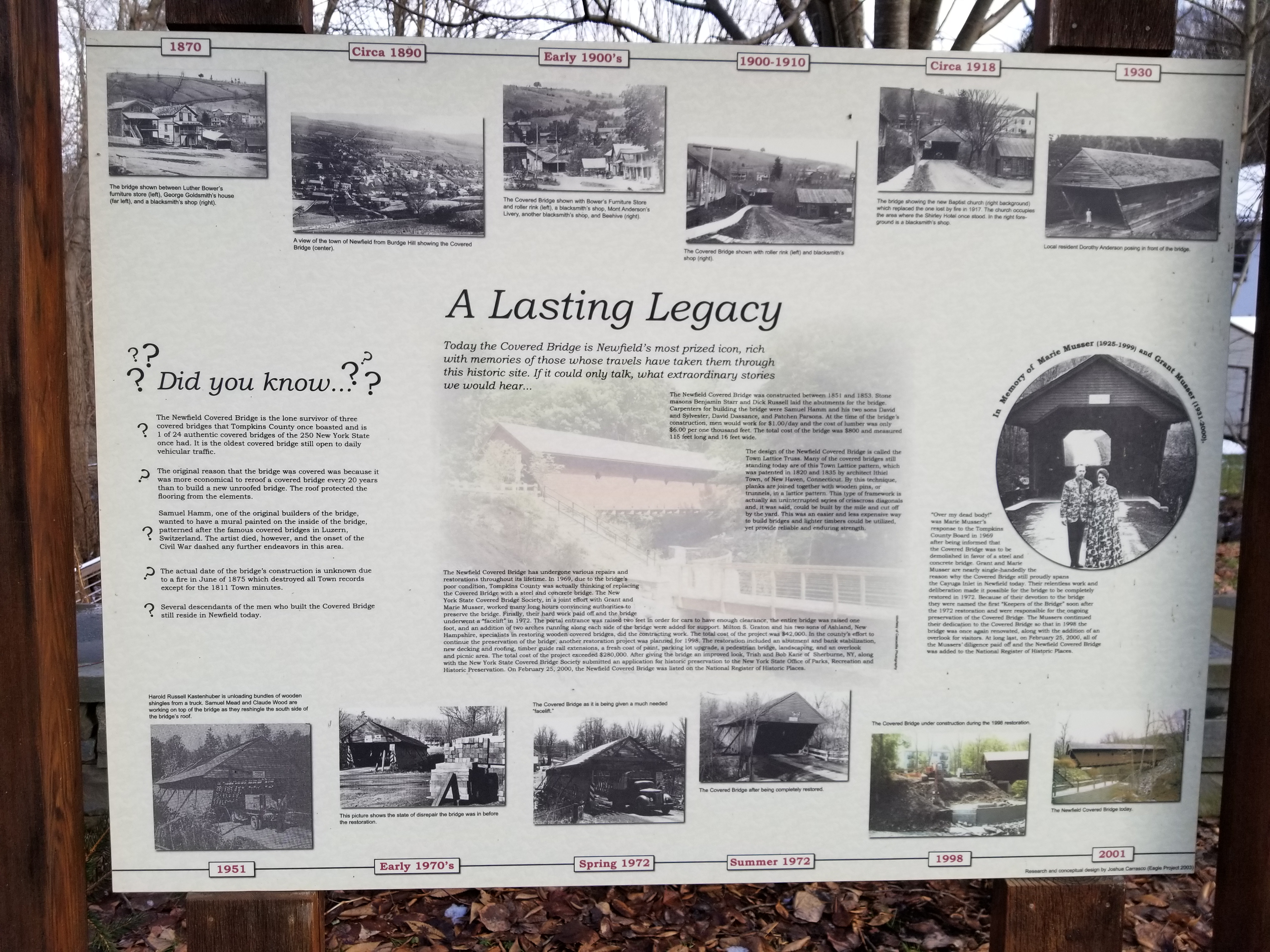
Interpretive signage
