= Inhalable insulin =

Powdered insulin delivered with an inhaler

Inhalable insulin

Inhalable insulin is a powdered form of insulin, delivered with an inhaler into the lungs where it is absorbed. In general, inhaled insulins have been more rapidly absorbed than subcutaneous injected insulin, with faster peak concentration in serum and more rapid metabolism. Exubera, developed by Inhale Therapeutics (later named Nektar Therapeutics), became the first inhaled insulin product to be marketed, in 2006 by Pfizer, but poor sales led Pfizer to withdraw it in 2007. Afrezza, a monomeric inhaled, ultra rapid-acting insulin developed by Mannkind, was approved by the FDA in 2014 and is the only inhaled insulin commercialized at the moment.

== History ==
Insulin was discovered by Sir Frederick G Banting, Charles H Best, and JJR Macleod from the University of Toronto in 1921 as an injectable agent. German researchers first introduced the idea of inhalable insulin in 1924. Years of failure followed until scientists realized they might be able to use new technologies to turn insulin into a concentrated powder with particles sized for inhalation.

In the 1980s Nektar Therapeutics, based on work by A. Carl Leopold on vitrifying proteins, developed technology to make insulin into small particles, technology then licensed to Pfizer. Alkermes developed a delivery device that they licensed to Eli Lilly and Company.

Once concrete methods were developed, human tests began in the late 1990s. In January 2006, the U.S. Food and Drug Administration (FDA) approved the use of Exubera, a form of inhalable insulin developed by Pfizer. It was approved in the UK in August 2006 but reimbursed by the National Health Service only for people who had problems with needles. It was not reimbursed by any U.S. insurer. A 2007 systematic review concluded that the inhaled hexameric insulin (Exubera) "appears to be as effective, but no better than injected short-acting insulin. The additional cost is so much more that it is unlikely to be cost-effective." In 2007, Pfizer announced that it would no longer manufacture or market Exubera. According to Chairman and CEO Jeffrey Kindler this was because Exubera "failed to gain acceptance among patients and physicians".

At the time of Exubera's discontinuation, several other companies were pursuing inhaled insulin including Alkermes working with Eli Lilly and Company, MannKind Corporation, and Aradigm working with Novo. By March 2008, except for MannKind's Afrezza product, all of these products had been discontinued because investors all decided to withdraw funding.

On March 16, 2009, MannKind submitted a new drug application for their inhalable insulin. In 2011, the FDA denied approval of Afrezza; because the design of the delivery device had changed, it requested additional clinical trials to ensure that people would use it the same way as the earlier versions. After conducting further studies, Mannkind submitted a new application, and in June 2014, the FDA approved Afrezza for both type 1 and type 2 adult diabetics, with a label restriction for patients having asthma, active lung cancer, or COPD. In 2014, Mannkind and Sanofi agreed that Sanofi would take over manufacturing and marketing of Afrezza, but Sanofi said it was dropping the effort in January 2016 due to poor sales of US$7.5 million in 2015; the companies formally terminated the agreement in November 2016. At the time that Sanofi announced it was dropping the product Mannkind said it would continue alone, and it had taken over manufacturing and relaunched the drug by July 2016. According to results presented at the 2018 meeting of the American Diabetes Association, Afrezza increases the time that blood glucose levels remain in the optimal range (74–106 mg/dl), reducing both spikes in blood glucose and time in hypoglycemia in adults with type 1 diabetes, compared to insulin aspart.
