= Bobcat Trail Habitation Cave =

- Bobcat Trail Habitation Cave (50-10-30-5004)
- U.S. National Register of Historic Places
- Location within Hawaii
- Location: Central Hawaiʻi Island
- Coordinates: 19°38′6″N 155°41′55″W
- Area: 0.3 acres (0.12 ha)
- Built: 1449-1500
- Architectural style: Ancient Hawaiian
- NRHP reference No.: 86001086
- Added to NRHP: May 15, 1986

Bobcat Trail Habitation Cave is a historic site of Ancient Hawaiian living quarters in a remote interior area of the island of Hawaiʻi.

== Location ==
Coordinates are approximate; The site is within the Puuanahulu ahupuaʻa (region) of the North Kona District on the island of Hawaiʻi. The exact location is kept restricted to avoid damage to the site. It is on U.S. Federal land which is part of the Pohakuloa Training Area. At an elevation of 5,100–9,000 ft (1,600–2,700 m), the arid area receives only 20 in (510 mm) of rainfall per year. The vegetation is a mix of subalpine and montane dry shrublands.

It is named for the nearby Bobcat Trail, which has been proposed to be restored into part of a Mauna Loa trail system.

== History ==
The trail was part of a system used before the time of King ʻUmi, who moved the royal residence to a site nearby on the same high plateau in the 16th century, now called Ahu A ʻUmi Heiau. Original studies were focused on the coastal areas that remain inhabited today, but even this more marginal area has evidence of human activity from A.D. 700 until the 18th century. Ancient Hawaiians hunted birds and gathered wood extensively on the plateau. They valued both seabirds that nested here for food, and forest birds for colorful feathers used in ceremonial garments. While hunting, they camped in the caves formed by Lava tubes, placing gourds on the floor to collect water that dripped from the ceiling. The forests provided sandalwood and medicinal plants. Bundles of sandalwood were found where they were left for later transport to the larger communities on the coast.

== Protection ==
The site is state archaeological site number 10-30-5004 (this number, plus "50-" to indicate the state of Hawaii, was appended to its name on the National registry). It was added to the National Register of Historic Places on May 15, 1986 as site number 86001086. In 1995 a comprehensive survey of the area was funded by the U.S. Army to produce an environmental management plan. In 2004, another study was done for some proposed improvements to the training area. Although this cave is the only one listed on the register, there are several others in the area.

== See also ==
- Native American Graves Protection and Repatriation Act
- Contributing property
- Cultural landscape
- Historic preservation
- Keeper of the Register
- List of heritage registers
- Property type (National Register of Historic Places)
- United States National Register of Historic Places listings
- State Historic Preservation Office
