= Bempegaldesleukin =

Bempegaldesleukin INN: bempegaldesleukin
Identifiers
- CAS Number: 1939126-74-5
- DrugBank: DB15140
- UNII: BNO1JG5MZC
- KEGG: D11669

Bempegaldesleukin (development code NKTR-214) is an experimental anti-cancer drug candidate. It is a PEGylated interleukin-2 (IL-2) acting as a CD122-preferential IL-2 pathway agonist designed to activate and proliferate CD8^{+} T cells and NK cells. It is being developed by Nektar Therapeutics.

In August 2019 the FDA granted breakthrough therapy designation to bempegaldesleukin in combination with nivolumab for the treatment of advanced melanoma. It is in phase 3 clinical trials for melanoma and renal cell carcinoma.

== Mechanism of action ==
Bempegaldesleukin is a recombinant form of human cytokine interleukin-2 conjugated to six releasable polyethylene glycol chains. PEGylation of IL-2 is utilized to alter its receptor binding. PEG chains are located at the region of IL-2 that binds to the IL2Rα subunit of the heterotrimeric IL2Rαβγ complex, reducing its ability to bind and activate the heterotrimer. The IL2Rαβγ complex is constitutively expressed on regulatory T cells (Tregs). Therefore, without the use of mutations, PEGylation reduces the affinity for IL2Rαβγ to a greater extent than for IL2Rβγ (CD122), the receptor complex predominant on CD8^{+} T cells. When fully PEGylated, it is a pro-drug that has essentially no biological activity. Upon intravenous administration, the PEG chains slowly release to generate active cytokine species. Consequently, it increases the proliferation, activation, and effector function of CD8^{+} T cells and NK cells within the tumor microenvironment without expanding the undesirable intra-tumoral regulatory T cells.

== Development ==
Bempegaldesleukin is investigated in combination with other anti-cancer agents. In February 2018 Nektar Therapeutics announced development and commercialization collaboration with Bristol-Myers Squibb to evaluate combination of bempegaldesleukin and nivolumab. In November 2018 Nektar announced collaboration with Pfizer to evaluate combination of Bempegaldesleukin with avelumab and talazoparib or enzalutamide in multiple cancers. In March 2022 it was reported that trials for melanoma didn't meet statistical significance at the first interim analysis.
