= MannKind Corporation =

American Bio Pharmaceutical Company

- Type: Public
- Traded as: Nasdaq: MNKD; Russell 2000 Component
- Industry: Biotechnology
- Founded: 1991; 35 years ago
- Founder: Alfred E. Mann
- Headquarters: Danbury, Connecticut, U.S.
- Key people: Kent Kresa (chairman); Dr. Michael E. Castagna (CEO)
- Revenue: ▲US$63.038 million (2019)
- Operating income: ▲ −US$44.597 million (2019)
- Net income: ▲ −US$51.903 million (2019)
- Total assets: ▼$93.725 million (2019)
- Total equity: ▲$284.252 million (2019)
- Number of employees: ▼233 (2019)
- Website: mannkindcorp.com

MannKind Corporation is a biopharmaceutical company focusing on the discovery, development, and commercialization of therapeutic products for diseases such as diabetes and pulmonary arterial hypertension. Based in Danbury, Connecticut, the company was founded in February 1991.

MannKind Corporation was named after its founder, Alfred E. Mann.

== History ==
Founded in February 1991, the company's present form is a result of a 2003 merger of three companies owned by Alfred E. Mann: Pharmaceutical Discovery Corporation (PDC), the cancer vaccine developer CTL ImmunoTherapies, Inc., and its sister company Allecure Corp, which was developing an allergy vaccine technology. Pharmaceutical Discovery was purchased in 2001 from Solomon Steiner; with that purchase MannKind acquired the Technosphere molecule and Medtone inhaler, upon which was developed its lead product, Afrezza (inhalable insulin).

The FDA approved Afrezza on June 27, 2014.

On August 11, 2014 MannKind entered into an exclusive global licensing agreement with Sanofi for Afrezza sales. Under the agreement, MannKind received $150 million cash from Sanofi, in exchange for sharing profits and losses of sales of Afrezza, with 65% for Sanofi and 35% for MannKind. On January 5, 2016, MannKind Corporation announced the termination of the license and collaboration agreement with Sanofi. By December 2017, the company had lost 11% of its trading volume due to the poor sales.

In March 2020, the company announced it was working with fellow pharmaceutical company Immix Biopharma to try to develop an inhalable treatment for acute respiratory distress syndrome, a lung disease.

== Products and product candidates ==
The firm has developed Afrezza a rapid-acting insulin peaking 12 to 15 minutes after inhalation and exiting the body within 2–3 hours. The inhalation technology uses a miniature, breath-powered inhaler in combination with single-use cartridges containing pre-metered doses. Initial pharmacokinetic studies were followed by studies of safety and efficiency involving Technosphere formulations of different therapeutic proteins.

== Leadership ==
Mann was chief executive officer until January 12, 2015 when Hakan Edstrom became CEO and Mann transitioned to executive chairman.

In November 2015, Hakan Edstrom stepped down as CEO and president. Company founder Alfred Mann stepped in as interim CEO on November 19, 2015. In 2016, Matthew Pfeffer was appointed CEO of MannKind, and served as both CEO and CFO. In May 2017, Michael Castagna was named CEO of the company.

== Facilities ==
MannKind has a large corporate office in Westlake Village, California. The Afrezza manufacturing facility is in Danbury, Connecticut. In 2022, the company moved its official headquarters to Danbury.
