= Nektar Therapeutics =

American healthcare company

- Formerly: Inhale Therapeutic Systems, Inc.
- Company type: Public
- Traded as: Nasdaq: NKTR
- Industry: Biopharmaceuticals
- Founded: 1990; 36 years ago
- Headquarters: San Francisco, California, U.S.
- Products: Exubera; Movantik
- Revenue: US$90.1million (2023)
- Number of employees: 137 (2024)
- Website: nektar.com

Nektar Therapeutics is an American biopharmaceutical company. The company was founded in 1990 and is based in San Francisco, California. The company develops new drug candidates by applying its proprietary PEGylation and advanced polymer conjugate technologies to modify chemical structure of substances, which improves drug characteristics like retention and solubility. It is a technology supplier to a number of pharmaceutical companies including Affymax, Amgen, Merck, Pfizer and UCB Pharma, etc. The company developed the world's first inhalable non-injectable insulin, Exubera, which was awarded as the bronze award by Wall Street Journal for its technological breakthrough.

== Background ==
The company is engaged in developing a proprietary pipeline of drug candidates for several therapeutic areas including oncology, pain, anti-infectives, anti-viral and immunology. The company's research and development involve in small molecule and biologic drug candidates. Its drug candidate base consists of naloxegol (Movantik), a Phase III oral opioid antagonist, etirinotecan pegol, a topoisomerase inhibitor under Phase III clinical study as of 2012, NKTR 061, NKTR-181, NKTR-214, etc.

In 2013, the company was assigned a patent which was developed by the company and other four co-inventors. The products of the company is served as a supplement to improve the pharmacokinetics, pharmacodynamics, half-life, bioavailability and other areas of drugs for the patients worldwide. As of March 2014, the company had a market capitalization of $1.7 billion with an enterprise value of $1.67 billion.

As of December 2024, at a stock price-per-share of roughly $1, the market cap is roughly $171 million. Nektar underwent periods of downsizing after unsuccessful partnerships were ended with Eli Lilly in 2023 and Bristol Myers Squibb in 2022, resulting in layoffs of most company employees.

=== Pipeline ===
Etirinotecan pegol was in the phase III BEACON trial as well as in the I-SPY2 adaptive clinical trial for breast cancer in 2016. The European Medicines Agency refused a marketing authorisation in 2017.

Bempegaldesleukin (NKTR-214) is a CD122-biased immune-stimulatory cytokine, Phase I results were announced in November 2016. It is now in a phase 2 trial in combination with nivolumab for various advanced cancers.

In 2023 Nektar's partnership with Eli Lilly in development of "rezpeg" was ended. Eli Lilly claimed the drug lacked suitable efficacy, while Nektar responded that Eli Lilly had botched the analysis.
