= Steve Amerson =

American singer-songwriter (born 1954)

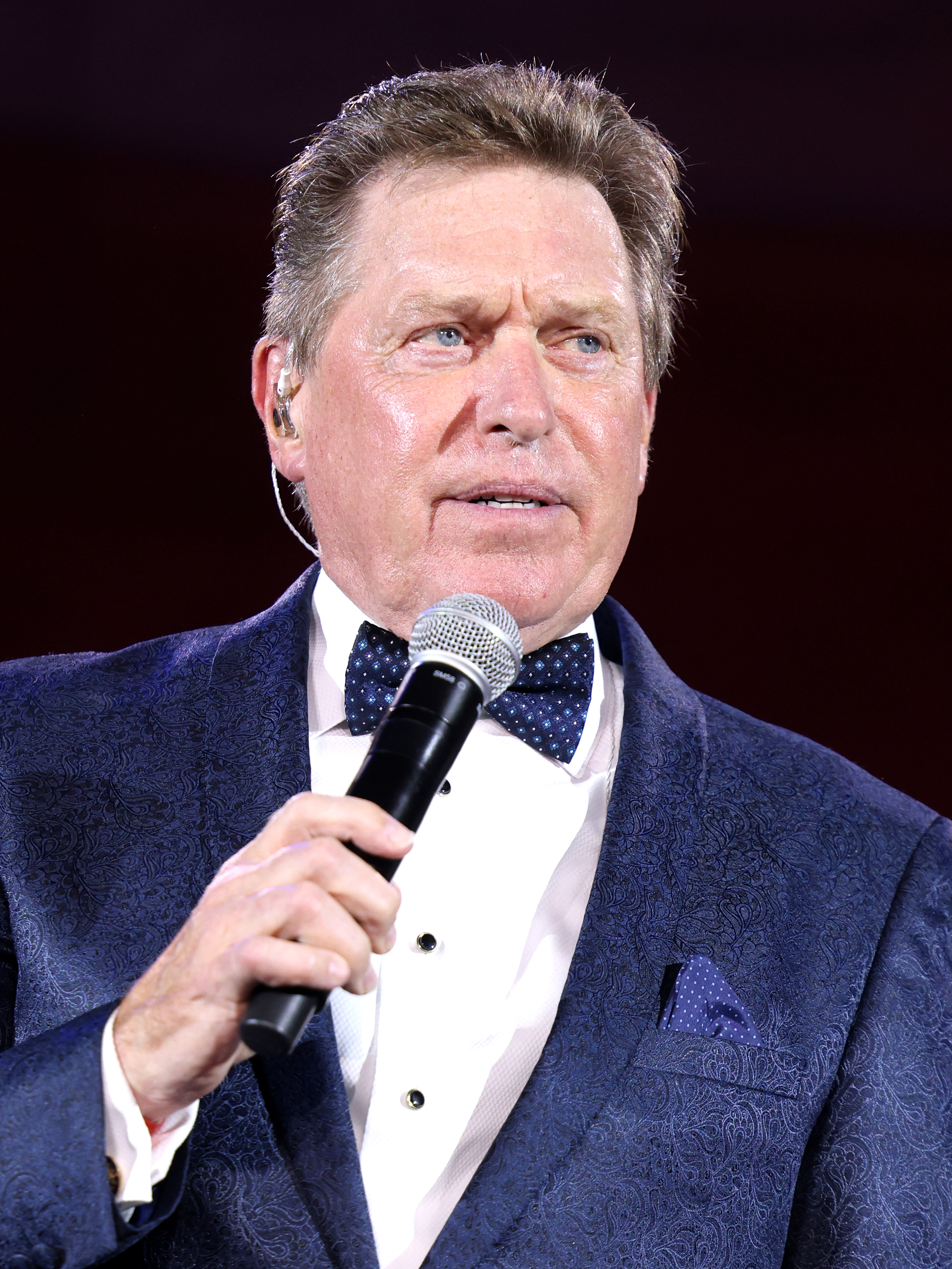
- Amerson in 2026

Background information
- Also known as: America's Tenor
- Born: Stephen Amerson; March 28, 1954 (age 72)
- Origin: New Albany, Indiana, US
- Genres: Broadway, classical, inspirational, worship music
- Occupations: Vocalist/Singer, composer, producer
- Instrument: Vocals tenor
- Website: www.steveamerson.com

Stephen "Steve" Amerson (born March 28, 1954) is a singer, songwriter, and recording artist with 18 albums.

During his 30-plus-year career, Amerson has been heard on over 175 films, countless commercials, and television shows. Additionally, Amerson has had approximately 100 compositions published by WORD Music and other publishing companies. In 1988, Amerson established Amerson Music Ministries (AMM) as a non-profit organization. He has produced and sung on 18 inspirational albums under the AMM label. Amerson has been a featured soloist with major symphonies in the United States and abroad including performances at the Hollywood Bowl and Carnegie Hall.

== Career ==
=== Early life and education ===
A native of New Albany, Indiana, Steve Amerson began singing in children's choirs in the church. He grew up in New Albany, Columbus and Indianapolis, Indiana, and Canton, Ohio. His formal vocal training began when he was attending Lincoln High School in Canton, Ohio. He attended Taylor University in Upland, Indiana and graduated in 1976 with a BA in Music Theory and Composition. He obtained a master's degree in Church Music from Southern Seminary in Louisville, Kentucky. After earning his master's degree, he studied voice privately with Alan Rogers Lindquest in Santa Barbara, California and Nina Hinson & Shegemi Matsumoto in Los Angeles.

=== Sacred music ===
Steve has been a guest soloist for many special events, including Billy Graham Crusades in the United States and Canada, the National Religious Broadcasters Convention, the Christian Booksellers Convention, and Founders Week at Moody Bible Institute. On numerous occasions, Steve has ministered alongside well-known pastors and authors including Charles Swindoll, Jack Hayford, Ravi Zacharias, Bruce Wilkinson and David Jeremiah. He also provides music for other ministry organizations including Mission India, International Aid, American Bible Society, ALPHA and Celebrators events.

=== General marketplace ===
Steve Amerson often partners with a Broadway veteran, soprano Laurie Gayle Stephenson, who is recognized for her performance as "Christine" in "Phantom of the Opera" on Broadway.

Amerson has performed at the Dorothy Chandler Pavilion, at the Hollywood Bowl and at Carnegie Hall, singing in the world premiere of Missa Americana by Ed Lojeski. He has performed with symphonies and performing arts groups around the world including the Los Angeles Philharmonic, Los Angeles Master Chorale, and Filarmonica de Jalisco in Guadalajara, Mexico. Amerson recorded demonstration tapes used by Luciano Pavarotti, Plácido Domingo and José Carreras in preparation for "The 3 Tenors" performances in 1994 at Dodger Stadium, in the 1998 Paris concert and the 2002 Yokohama, Japan concert.

Amerson has contributed his voice to over 175 feature films and other productions including "La La Land," "Bridge of Spies," "Fantastic Four," "Star Wars: Rogue One," Mars Needs Moms, The Last Airbender, 2012, and Seven Pounds'.

=== American patriotism ===
Since 2006, Amerson has performed for Congressional Medal of Honor Foundation and Society events at the New York Stock Exchange in New York City, at the Ronald Reagan Library in Simi Valley, California and also in Dallas, Chicago, Atlanta, Denver and at the dedication of the Medal of Honor Museum on board the USS Yorktown in Charleston. In 2009, Steve was presented the Bob Hope Award for Excellence in Entertainment by the Medal of Honor Society. He has also performed for events supporting the military such as The Gary Sinise Foundation, American Airline's Sky Ball and Snowball Express.

== Personal life ==
Steve Amerson lives in Granada Hills, California. Amerson is married to Kristine Amerson and has fathered two children: Mathew Amerson and Katharine Amerson. Amerson started nonprofit Amerson Music Ministries, to use music to spread his ministry. Amerson makes his living through performing at shows, recording music for commercials and motion pictures. Amerson has contributed to the soundtracks of more than 50 films and commercials. His vocals can be found on feature films like Beauty and the Beast, Men in Black, and The Hunt for Red October. Amerson has worked with Honda, Toyota, Coca-Cola, and Microsoft on commercials.

== Amerson Music Ministries (AMM) ==
Amerson Music Ministries (AMM) is a small 501(c)(3) non-profit organization started by Amerson in 1992 based in Los Angeles, CA. Amerson continues to own it to this day, using this nonprofit to produce music and host events such as the Amerson Music Ministries (AMM) and Capitol Worship. Amerson has toured across the United States and through Europe, performing solo shows at concerts and religious conventions. In addition to performing, Amerson has continued his work as a preacher throughout his musical career, often integrating music into his sermons. Amerson works in the church and uses those connections to spread his musical ministry.

== Discography ==
- 1990: Call Upon the Lord
- 1991: He Is My Strength
- 1994: This Could Be the Day
- 1996: Living at the Horizon
- 1998: Front Row Center
- 1998: To the Ends of the Earth
- 1999: Hymns and Gospel Songs
- 2000: It's Christmastime
- 2001: The Cross in the Road
- 2001: The Collection, vol. 1
- 2005: Sacred Spaces
- 2006: Front Row Center II
- 2008: Majestic Hymns
- 2009: Amazed by America
- 2015: Thankful
- 2017: And So We Sing/Collection II
- 2017: We Need a Little Christmas
- 2022: Great American Songs
