= Greensprings Natural Cemetery Preserve =

Cemetery in Tompkins County, New York, US

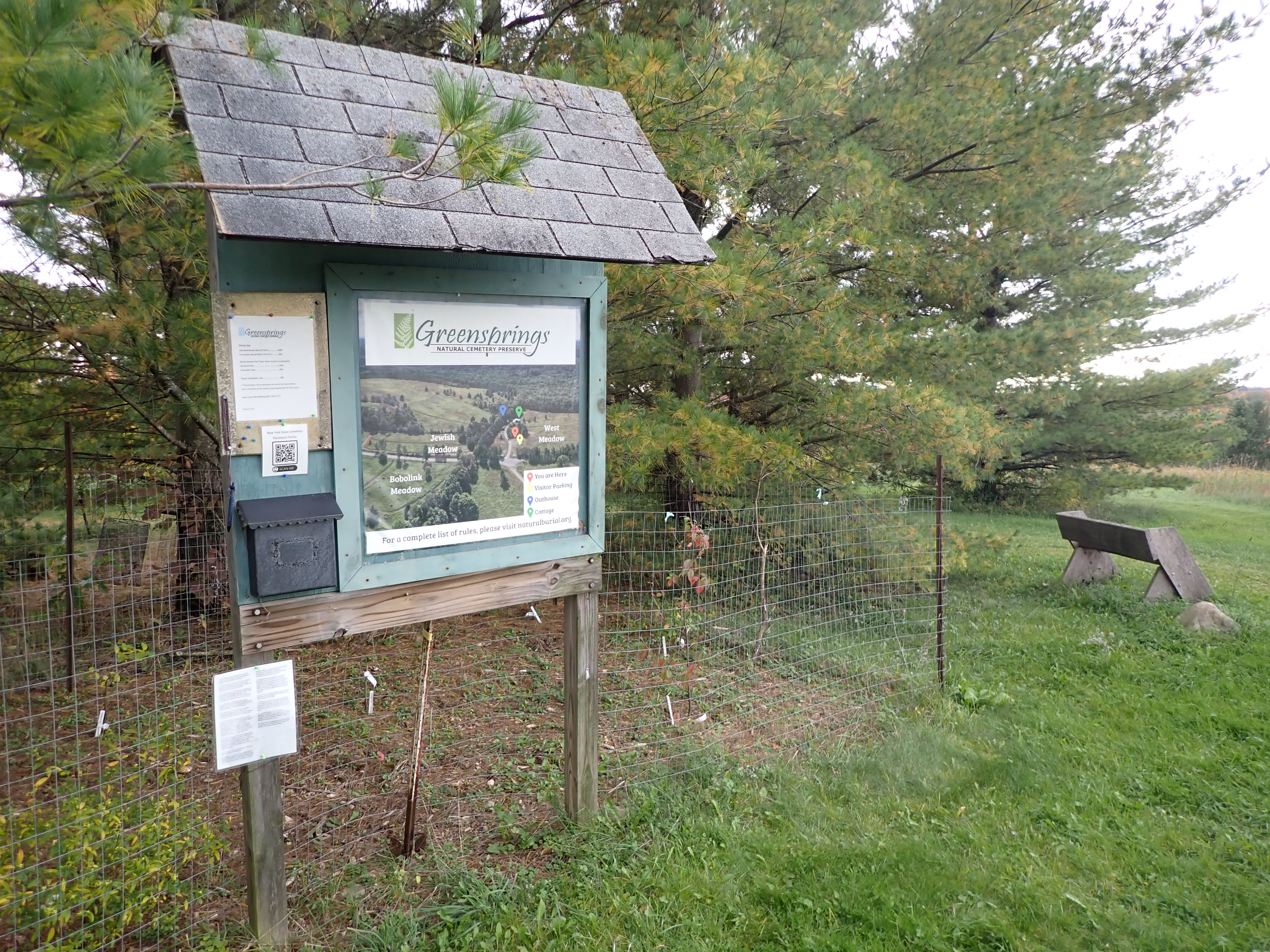
- Entrance sign of Greensprings Natural Cemetery Preserve
- Interactive map of Greensprings Natural Cemetery Preserve

Details
- Established: 2006; 20 years ago
- Location: Newfield, New York
- Country: U.S.
- Coordinates: 42.294°N 76.640°W
- Type: Non-profit
- Owned by: Greensprings Natural Cemetery Association
- Size: 130 acres (53 ha)
- Website: www.naturalburial.org
- Find a Grave: Greensprings Natural Cemetery Preserve

Greensprings Natural Cemetery Preserve is a non-profit cemetery located at 293 Irish Hill Road in Newfield, New York. Founded in 2006 as a natural burial cemetery, the preserve covers 130 acres (53 ha) of rolling meadows and is surrounded by 8,000 acres (3,200 ha) of Cornell University's Arnot Forest and Newfield State Forest.

== History ==
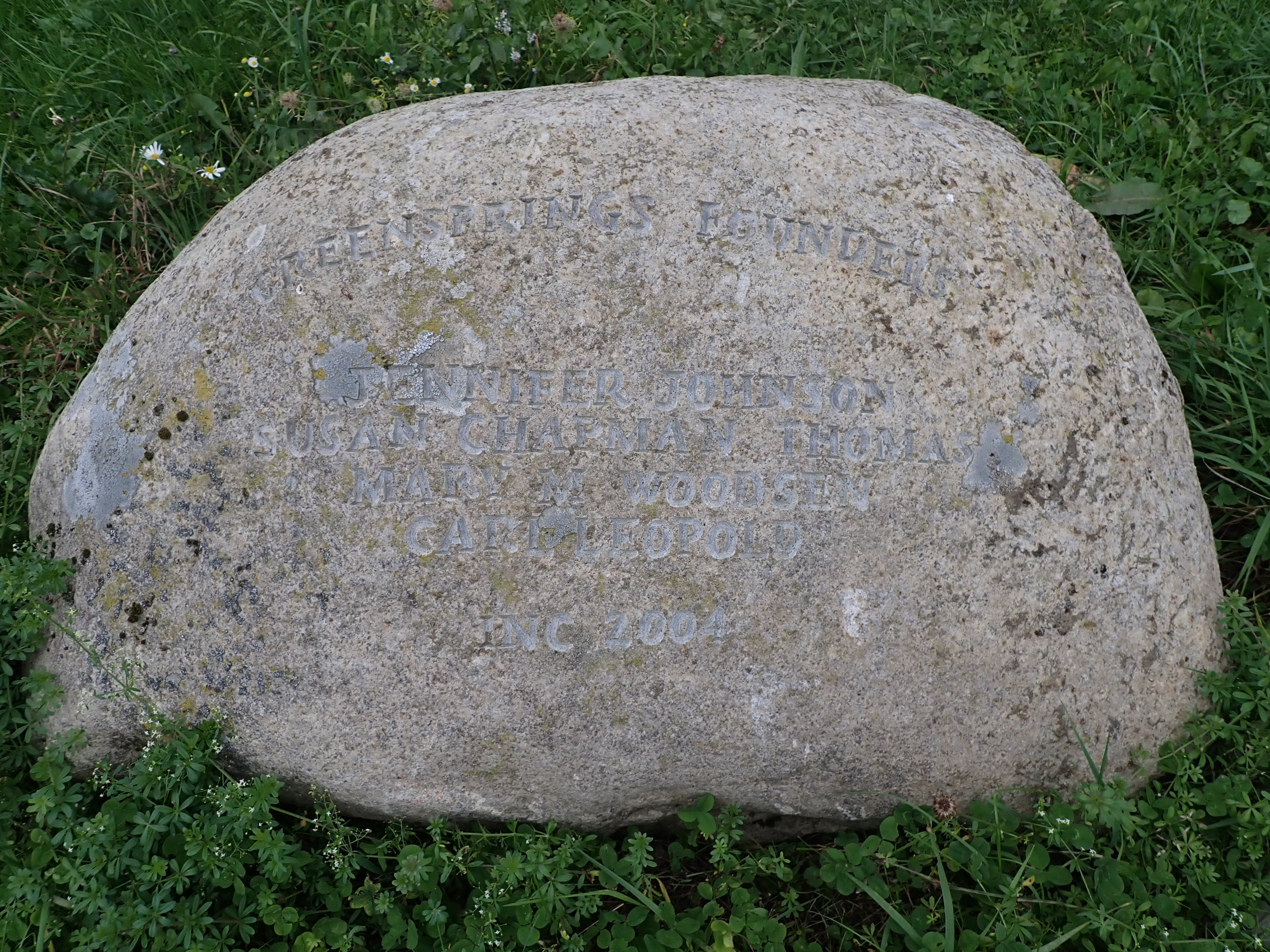
Stone marker dedicated to the founders of Greensprings Natural Cemetery Preserve

Greensprings is one of the first green burial sites in New York State, and one of only a few 100% natural cemeteries in the United States. The Greensprings Natural Cemetery Association was incorporated in 2004 under the leadership of Jennifer Johnson, Susan Thomas, Mary Woodsen, and Carl Leopold. Initially, seven acres of land on Irish Hill in Newfield, New York were purchased from Herb Engman, a Town of Ithaca supervisor and staunch ecologist. Engman subsequently donated a further 93 acres to the preserve, thereby becoming the preserve's main benefactor. The first natural burial at Greensprings occurred in 2006. Greensprings has been working with the Natural Resource Conservation Service of the USDA to make the preserve more inviting to grassland birds, improve pollinator habitat, and remove invasive tree and shrub species.

== Facilities ==
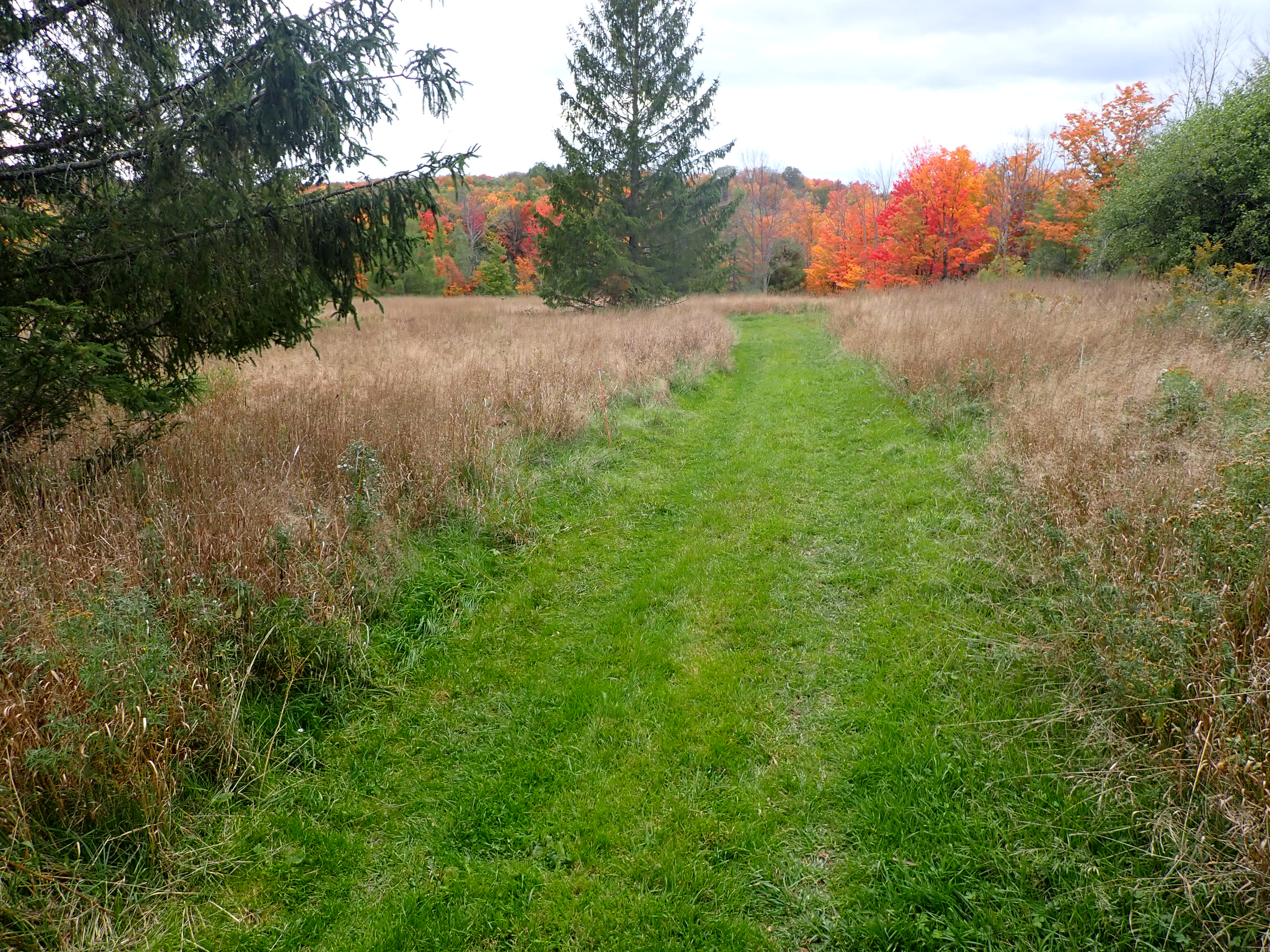
Fall scenery at West Meadow in Greensprings Natural Cemetery Preserve.

Greensprings Natural Cemetery Preserve is at the top of Irish Hill in Newfield, New York. The site of a former dairy farm, the preserve comprises 130 acres of meadows and woodland, and is surrounded by an additional 8,000 acres of protected land consisting of Cornell University's Arnot Forest and Newfield State Forest. From the bench at Leopold Lookout, named in honor of founder Carl Leopold, who is buried at Greensprings, it is possible to see all the way to the Endless Mountains of Pennsylvania.

Burials at Greensprings occur in 15' x 15' (4.6 m x 4.6 m) plots. Bodies are not embalmed and there are no burial vaults. Only biodegradable materials such as natural fiber shrouds, wicker baskets, or plain wooden coffins are allowed. Grave markers lie flat with the earth and consist of uncut, locally sourced stones. Although burying and scattering of ashes is permitted in designated areas at Greensprings, this practice is somewhat discouraged due to the environmental costs of cremation.

A section of the cemetery, consecrated by Rabbi Scott Glass, is designated for Jewish burials. The "Remembrance Grove" is intended for people who have suffered miscarriages or the death of a child.
