= Michael C. Latham =

Tanzanian-born nutritionist (1928–2011)

Michael C. Latham (May 6, 1928 – April 1, 2011) was a Tanzanian-born professor emeritus at Cornell University.

== Life ==
Latham was born in Tanzania in 1928. Latham studied medicine at Trinity College Dublin in Ireland for both his undergraduate (1949) and graduate (1952) degrees. Later, he graduated with a master's degree in tropical medicine from the University of London in 1958 and a master's degree in public health and nutrition from Harvard University in 1965.

Between 1955 and 1964, Latham worked for the Ministry of Health in Tanzania and served as its director of nutrition.

In 1963, Latham began advocating for the use of breastfeeding instead of infant milk formula, and after a decade of struggle, in 1981 he was able to regulate the marketing of infant formula.

To promote breastfeeding, he co-founded the World Alliance for Breastfeeding Action in 1991.

== Awards ==
- Order of the British Empire (1965)
- American Society of Nutritional Sciences Kellogg Prize in International Nutrition
- Gopalan Medal awarded by the Nutrition Society of India

== Bibliography ==
- Kilimanjaro Tales: The Saga of a Medical Family in Africa
- Human Nutrition in Tropical Africa
- Human Nutrition in the Developing World
- Hidden Hunger and the Role of Public-Private Partnership
