= Devon Rose =

American singer-songwriter

dev.m4a
- Born: Devon Rose Renaldo; October 21, 1995 (age 30); Santa Monica, California
- Genres: Pop, Alternative
- Occupations: Singer-Songwriter, Producer
- Instruments: Vocals, guitar, drums, bass, piano
- Years active: 2012 - Present
- Website: http://devm4a.com

Devon Rose (formerly Lani Renaldo) known professionally by their (Note: Rose is nonbinary and uses they/them and she/her pronouns. This article uses they/them for consistency.) stage name dev.m4a, is an American songwriter, multi-instrumentalist, and blogger from Los Angeles, CA. Their music has been recommended by American Songwriter, Wonderland, The Line of Best Fit, Billboard, Wild Honey Pie and LADYGUNN.

== Early life ==
Rose was born October 21, 1995, in Los Angeles, CA. They graduated from Crossroads School for Arts and Sciences in 2014. They graduated from the University of Southern California in 2018.

== Career ==
In 2012, Rose was picked to go to the GRAMMY Foundation's GRAMMY CAMP in New York to participate as a songwriter.

They appeared in the Samsung Level Music Lab with Halsey. They later opened for her, along with the BadSuns at the Shrine Expo Hall on a date of the Badlands Tour.

Rose has written for PopWrapped and was a Campus Editor-At-Large for the Huffington Post. In 2015, they appeared on the daytime talk show The Doctors, after having written an open letter complaining about clothes not fitting.

In September 2021, Rose became the face of the color "GRAVEDIGGER," for Good Dye Young's campaign "METALHEADS."

== Personal life ==
Rose is as queer. They came out as nonbinary in October 2021, and use they/them and she/her pronouns.

Rose cites Whitney Houston, Mariah Carey and Prince as inspirations.
