= Lani Stemmermann =

American botanist

Ruth Leilani Stemmermann (7 September 1952 - 14 March 1995), also known as Lani Stemmermann, was an assistant professor of plant ecology, biology and environmental science at the University of Hawaiʻi at Mānoa (UHM) and Hawaiʻi Community College in Hilo. Stemmermann was a botanist dedicated to the research and preservation of Hawai'i's vegetation, chiefly known for her triumph in a lawsuit against the U.S. Army to protect native plants in the Pohakuloa Training Area. In 1990, Stemmermann collaborated with Stanford University and became the co-principal of the National Science Foundation project known as the "Ecosystem Dynamics in Hawaiʻi" which allowed her to establish a Common Garden to study the native rainforest trees, now known as the Stemmermann Common Garden.

== Biography ==
=== Childhood ===
Lani Stemmermann was born and raised in Hilo on the Big Island of Hawaiʻi. She was the child of a notable pathologist and epidemiologist, Dr. Grant Nicholas Stemmermann, and Jean Elizabeth Gammon. Her father later remarried Nell Jane Nelson. Lani had one sister, Maile Kjargaard, along with two half sisters, Mele Stemmermann and Rachel Stemmermann.

=== Education ===
Stemmermann received her primary and secondary education from the Hawaiʻi School of Girls and graduated in 1970. She then attended Pitzer College in Claremont, California where she earned her B.A. degree in botany in 1974. Subsequently, Stemmermann pursued her M.S. degree in Botanical Sciences at the University of Hawaiʻi at Mānoa. She was granted a two-year research assistantship with Dr. C. H. Lamoureux and served as a teaching assistant for the Botany Department. Stemmermann earned her M.S. degree in Botanical Sciences in 1976 and published two studies regarding the anatomy and taxonomy of Hawaiian sandalwood as part of her thesis. Stemmermann furthered her studies in botany at UHM where she eventually earned her Ph.D. in Botanical Sciences in 1986.

=== Death ===
Stemmermann died at the age of 42 on March 14, 1995, from malignant lymphoma. The illness lasted for a couple years and impeded her research on the Common Garden along with other field work. A memorial gathering was held on March 25, 1995, at Kipuka Puaulu picnic area of the Hawai'i Volcanoes National Park, arranged by Dodo Mortuary.

== Work/Legacy ==
=== Academic career ===
While pursuing her M.S. degree at the University of Hawaiʻi at Mānoa in 1976, Stemmermann worked as a teaching assistant in the Botany Department. During her doctoral program, Stemmermann worked for the Army Corps of Engineers in which she consulted on Micronesian wetland vegetation. In 1986, Stemmermann was hired as an instructor and eventually became an assistant professor at UHM and Hawai'i Community College in Hilo.

=== Preservation of Native Plants ===
==== The Stemmermann Common Garden ====
In 1990, Stemmermann collaborated with Stanford University on a NSF research known as the "Ecosystem Dynamics in Hawaiʻi" to study the native rainforest trees. She established a Common Garden as part of the project and had a significant role in the conservation of the most dominant rainforest tree in Hawai'i, Metrosideros polymorpha. Unfortunately, the progression of the malignant lymphoma slowed her progress in the research project in 1993 and halted after she died in 1995. The responsibility of the Common Garden was then assumed by Dr. Mueller-Dombois and several UHM graduate students, who eventually renamed it to the Stemmermann Common Garden to honor her efforts.

==== U.S. Army Pohakuloa Training Area ====
Lani Stemmermann was passionate and had a deep bond for Hawaiʻi's vegetation and landscape. On November 24, 1989, Stemmermann visited the Pohakuloa Training Area to assess and study native plants. She found Army bulldozers plowing through the naio and mamame trees to make room for building a Multi-Purpose Range Complex (MPRC). On December 1, 1989, Stemmermann sued the Army with the assistance of the Sierra Club Legal Defense Fund. The lawsuit demanded the cessation of MPRC project and pressured the Army to issue a statement acknowledging the environmental impact of the project. Due to a lack of plant survey data and insufficient evidence to support the presence of endangered or unique plant fauna in the Pohakuloa Training Area, the court ruled the Army did not violate any law and that an Environmental Assessment (EA) and a Finding of No Significant Impact (FONSI) notice were issued by the state. Before Stemmermann's appeal came to trial in September 1990, the Army agreed to issue a full environmental impact statement and to restore the training area to its natural state as part of a settlement agreement.

==== Native Ohia Forest in South Kona ====
On November 12, 1992, Stemmermann testified in the appeal of an approval for the Asahi Joint Venture golf course in the threatened native 'ohi'a forest in South Kona. The 'ohi'a lehua is also known as Metrosideros polymorpha. Stemmermann studied this plant species extensively for a decade since 1982 and published three associated research papers in an effort to conserve this species. She stated "native forests should all be considered threatened. They're threatened with land use conversion." Stemmermann attested the destruction of the 'ohi'a forest directly threatened endangered species including Hawaiian bats, amakihi, and apapane occupying the habitat.

== Publications ==
- Lamoureux, C. & Stemmermann, L. (1976). Report of the Kī-pahulu bicentennial expedition, June 26-29, 1976. St. John Plant Science Laboratory, University of Hawaiʻi.
- Stemmermann, L. (1976). Distribution and vegetation anatomy of Hawaiian sandalwood. In C. W. Smith (Eds.), Proceedings of the First Conference in Natural Sciences Hawaii Volcanoes National Park (pages 223–226). University of Hawaiʻi at Mānoa, Department of Botany.
- Stemmermann, L., & Proby, F. (1978). Inventory of wetland vegetation in the Caroline Islands. VTN Pacific for the U.S. Army Corps of Engineers, Pacific Ocean Division.
- Stemmermann, L. & Smith, C. (1978). Haleakala National Park Crater District resources basic inventory: The vascular flora of Haleakala. Cooperative National Park Resources Studies Unit, University of Hawaii at Manoa, Department of Botany.
- Stemmermann, L. (1980). Observations on the genus Santalum (Santalaceae) in Hawaii. Pacific Science, 34(1), pages 41–54.
- Stemmermann, L. (1980). Vegetative anatomy of the Hawaiian species of Santalum (Santalaceae). Pacific Science, 34(1), pages 55–75.
- Stemmermann, L. (1981). A guide to Pacific wetland plants. U.S. Army Corps of Engineers, Honolulu District.
- Stemmermann, L. (1982). Supplement to Technical report 38, Haleakala National Park Crater District resources basic inventory--conifer and flowering plants. Cooperative National Park Resources Studies Unit, University of Hawaiʻi at Mānoa, Department of Botany.
- Stemmermann, L. (1982). Research on ecotypes of Metrosideros. In C. W. Smith (Eds.), Proceedings of the Fourth Conference in Natural Sciences Hawaii Volcanoes National Park (page 156). University of Hawaii at Manoa, Department of Botany.
- Stemmermann, L. (1983). Ecological studies of Hawaiian Metrosideros in a Successional Context. Pacific Science, 37(4), pages 361–373.
- Smith, C. W., Stemmermann, L., Higashino, P. K., & Funk, E. (1986). Vascular plants of Pu'uhonua o Honaunau National Historical Park, Hawai'i. Cooperative National Park Resources Studies Unit, University of Hawaiʻi at Mānoa, Department of Botany. PCSU Technical Report, page 56.
- Stemmermann, L. (1991). Botanical survey : Proposed wilderness park between Honomalino and Manuka, South Kona and Kaʻu, Island of Hawaiʻi. The Division.
- Gerrish, G., Stemmermann, L., & Gardner, D. E. (1992). The distribution of Rubus species in the State of Hawaii. Cooperative National Park Resources Studies Unit, University of Hawaiʻi at Mānoa, Department of Botany. PCSU Technical Report, page 85.
- Tunison, J. T., Whiteaker, L. D., Cuddihy, L. W., La Rosa, A. M., Kageler, D. W., Gates, M. R., Zimmer, N. G., & Stemmermann, L. (1992). The distribution of selected localized alien plant species in Hawaiʻi Volcanoes National Park. Cooperative National Park Resources Studies Unit, University of Hawaiʻi at Mānoa, Department of Botany. PCSU Technical Report, page 84.
- Stemmermann, L., Hawaii C. C., & Ihsle, T. (1993). Replacement of Metrosideros polymorpha, "Ohi"a, in Hawaiian dry forest succession. Biotropica, 25(1), pages 36–45.

== Commemoration ==
- Dr. Ruth Lani Stemmermann Award of the Sierra Club of Hawaiʻi is a monetary award for young scientists who focus on conducting research regarding Hawaiʻi's environment.
- Dr. Lani Stemmermann Endowed Fellowship of the University of Hawaiʻi Professional Assembly (UHPA) is a merit-based scholarship for graduate students pursuing a Ph.D. in botany at the University of Hawaiʻi at Mānoa. UHPA President, Dr. David Duffy, contributed personal funds for the establishment of the endowment.
- The Stemmermann Memorial Garden of the Lyon Arboretum is a small garden located outside of the Visitors Center of the University of Hawaiʻi at Mānoa Lyon Arboretum to honor Dr. Lani Stemmermann.
- The Stemmermann Common Garden is a collaborative research project between University of Hawaiʻi at Mānoa and Stanford University, and was originally intended as Stemmermann's dissertation research. Following her death in 1995, the Common Garden was renamed after her in order to recognize her contribution to the research.
