= A. Carl Leopold =

American academic and plant physiologist

- Born: Aldo Carl Leopold; December 18, 1919; Albuquerque, New Mexico
- Died: November 18, 2009 (aged 89); Ithaca, New York
- Occupations: plant physiologist; academic

Aldo Carl Leopold (December 18, 1919 – November 18, 2009) was an American academic and plant physiologist, son of Aldo Leopold, a noted ecologist. He is known for his research on soybeans which led to techniques allowing insulin to be dried and later processed into an inhalable insulin.

== Early life and education ==
Aldo Carl Leopold was born to Aldo Leopold, a noted ecologist and employee of the United States Forest Service, and Estella Leopold in Albuquerque, New Mexico as the 4th of 5 children.

== Career ==
Leopold received a bachelor's degree in botany from the University of Wisconsin in 1941. He enlisted in the Marines during World War II and served in the Pacific as defense counsel in courts-martial for soldiers who were charged with being AWOL. After his discharge, Leopold received MS and PhD degrees in plant physiology from Harvard University, studying under Kenneth Thimann. He worked briefly for the Hawaiian Pineapple Company, and then joined the faculty of Purdue University in 1949. In 1975, he was appointed Graduate Dean and Assistant Vice President for Research at the University of Nebraska–Lincoln. In 1977, Leopold moved to the Boyce Thompson Institute for Plant Research (BTI) in Ithaca, New York as William H. Crocker Scientist.

He is known for being a pioneer in the study of the plant hormone auxin, and later for work on desiccation tolerance in seeds and gravitropism. He is the author, with Paul Kriedemann, of a widely used textbook on plant growth and development.

Seeds such as soybeans containing very high levels of protein can undergo desiccation, yet survive and revive after water absorption. Leopold began studying this capability at BTI in the mid-1980s. He found soybeans and corn to have a range of soluble carbohydrates protecting the seed's cell viability by forming a glassy state rather than drying completely. Patents were awarded to him in the early 1990s on techniques for protecting "biological membranes" and proteins in the dry state. Using the knowledge gleaned from studying the preservation of proteins in dry soybeans, Leopold developed a method to preserve peptide hormones like insulin in the glassy state so that they can be pulverized into a powder and inhaled by diabetics as an alternative to self-injection. His research on soybeans led to techniques that allowed insulin to be dried and later processed into an inhalable insulin, named Exubera by Pfizer.

== Personal life and death ==
Leopold was active in science and environmental issues from his retirement in 1990 until his death in 2009. Leopold, along with Ed Oyer, Thomas Eisner, Jim McConkey and Mary Woodson, was a founding member of the Preposthumous Society who together founded Greensprings Natural Cemetery Preserve. Leopold was the first member of the society to use it.

He was the founding president of the Finger Lakes Land Trust in 1989, to preserve wild lands in the Finger Lakes region of New York.

He founded the Tropical Forestry Initiative in 1993, which developed new methods to restore tropical forest from grazing lands in Costa Rica, and remained active until 2015.

He was cofounder of the Aldo Leopold Foundation in 1982 to help people explore and apply Aldo Leopold's land ethic.

== Works ==
- Auxins and Plant Growth (1955, 1960)
- Plant Growth and Development (1964, 1975)
