= Newfield, New York =

- Town
- Location within the state of New York
- Coordinates: 42°21′16″N 76°36′1″W
- Country: United States
- State: New York
- County: Tompkins

Area
  - Total: 58.97 sq mi (152.73 km^{2})
  - Land: 58.84 sq mi (152.40 km^{2})
  - Water: 0.13 sq mi (0.33 km^{2})
- Elevation: 1,601 ft (488 m)

Population (2020)
  - Total: 5,184 ▲
  - Estimate (2021): 5,107
  - Density: 90.4/sq mi (34.92/km^{2})
- Time zone: UTC-5 (Eastern (EST))
  - Summer (DST): UTC-4 (EDT)
- ZIP code: 14867
- Area code: 607
- FIPS code: 36-50254
- GNIS feature ID: 0979263

Newfield is a town in Tompkins County, New York, United States. The population was 5,184 at the 2020 census. The town's name is derived from the many unoccupied tracts of land that were once in the town.

The Town of Newfield is in the southwest part of the county and is southwest of Ithaca, New York.

== History ==
Newfield was formed, before Tompkins County was created, from the Town of Spencer (in Tioga County) in 1811 as the "Town of Cayuta." In 1822, the town assumed its current name.

During the Depression many abandoned farms were turned into conservation lands. Newfield contains one of New York State's few remaining covered bridges. The Newfield Covered Bridge was listed on the National Register of Historic Places in 2000.

== Geography ==
According to the United States Census Bureau, the town has a total area of 59.0 square miles (153 km^{2}), of which, 58.9 square miles (153 km^{2}) of it is land and 0.1 square miles (0.26 km^{2}) of it (0.15%) is water.

The south and west town lines are the border of Schuyler County.

New York State Route 13 is a northeast to southwest highway in Newfield. Conjoined New York State Route 34 and New York State Route 96 form a north–south highway in the eastern part of the town.

== Demographics ==
Historical population
Census	Pop.	Note	%±
1830	2,664		—
1840	3,567		33.9%
1850	3,816		7.0%
1860	2,984		−21.8%
1870	2,602		−12.8%
1880	2,608		0.2%
1890	2,214		−15.1%
1900	1,902		−14.1%
1910	1,509		−20.7%
1920	1,456		−3.5%
1930	1,451		−0.3%
1940	1,521		4.8%
1950	1,891		24.3%
1960	2,193		16.0%
1970	3,390		54.6%
1980	4,401		29.8%
1990	4,867		10.6%
2000	5,108		5.0%
2010	5,179		1.4%
2020	5,184		0.1%
2021 (est.)	5,107	▼	−1.5%
U.S. Decennial Census

As of the census of 2000, there were 5,108 people, 2,052 households, and 1,352 families residing in the town. The population density was 86.8 inhabitants per square mile (33.5/km^{2}). There were 2,203 housing units at an average density of 37.4 per square mile (14.4/km^{2}). The racial makeup of the town was 96.06% White, 1.08% African American, 0.55% Native American, 0.37% Asian, 0.49% from other races, and 1.45% from two or more races. Hispanic or Latino of any race were 1.04% of the population.

There were 2,052 households, out of which 34.4% had children under the age of 18 living with them, 50.0% were married couples living together, 11.4% had a female householder with no husband present, and 34.1% were non-families. 25.0% of all households were made up of individuals, and 7.6% had someone living alone who was 65 years of age or older. The average household size was 2.49 and the average family size was 2.98.

In the town, the population was spread out, with 27.2% under the age of 18, 7.6% from 18 to 24, 31.5% from 25 to 44, 24.9% from 45 to 64, and 8.8% who were 65 years of age or older. The median age was 36 years. For every 100 females, there were 93.4 males. For every 100 females age 18 and over, there were 91.7 males.

The median income for a household in the town was $36,693, and the median income for a family was $43,147. Males had a median income of $29,353 versus $27,064 for females. The per capita income for the town was $17,735. About 6.9% of families and 9.1% of the population were below the poverty line, including 11.3% of those under age 18 and 3.0% of those age 65 or over.

== Communities and locations in Newfield ==
- Connecticut Hill Wildlife Management Area — a conservation area in the northwest part of Newfield
- Newfield — the hamlet of Newfield is located on NY-13
- Newfield Station — the railroad stop which was just west of the hamlet of Nina which was at the junction of Newfield Depot Road and NY-34
- Robert H. Treman State Park — a state park partly in the north part of the town
- Stratton — a hamlet in the eastern part of the town near the junction of Piper Road and NY-34
- Trumbulls Corners — a hamlet in the northwest part of the town at junction of Trumbulls Corners Road and Millard Hill Road
- The Covered Bridge — located on Main Street as you are driving through town, and connects Main Street to Bank Street; built in 1853 and rehabilitated in 1998
- Mill Park — also located on Main Street about 1/4 mile south from the Covered Bridge
- Newfield Central School District — located on Main Street, less than 1/4 mile south of Mill Park
- Greensprings Natural Cemetery Preserve — city cemetery

== Notable people ==
- Wallace W. Johnson (1842-1911), American Civil War Medal of honor recipient
