= Pohakuloa Training Area =

US military base on Hawaii

Pōhakuloa Training Area
- Island of Hawaiʻi, Hawaiʻi
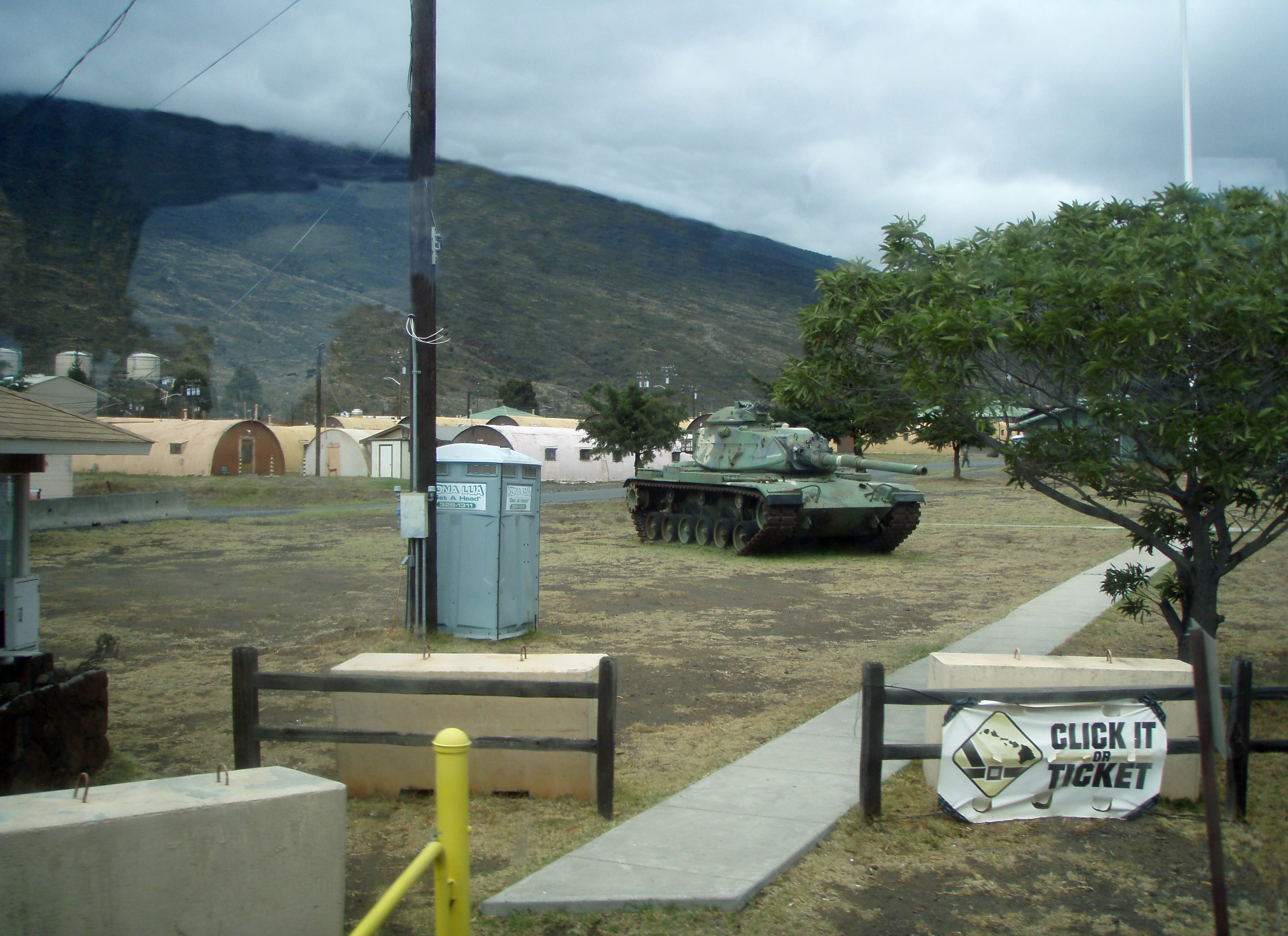
- The main gate at the Pōhakuloa Training Area.

Site information
- Type: Training facility
- Owner: United States Army
- Controlled by: United States

Location
- Coordinates: 19°45′21.6″N 155°32′49.2″W

Site history
- Built: 1955
- In use: Yes

Garrison information
- Current commander: Lt. Col. Tim Alvarado

Airfield information
- Identifiers: IATA: BSF, ICAO: PHSF, FAA LID: BSF
- Elevation: 1,886.8 metres (6,190 ft) AMSL
Runways
Direction	Length and surface
9/27	1,126 metres (3,694 ft) Asphalt

Pōhakuloa Training Area (PTA) is a US military training base located on the high plateau between Mauna Loa, Mauna Kea and the Hualālai volcanic mountains of the island of Hawaiʻi. It includes a small military airstrip known as Bradshaw Army Airfield.

== History ==
The region was used for live fire exercises in 1943 during World War II when Camp Tarawa temporarily held troops on Parker Ranch. About 91,000 acres (37,000 ha) were leased from Richard Smart, owner of the ranch. At that time it was called the Waikoloa Maneuver Area, and located northwest of current base, south of Waimea. In September 1946 the land used for the old maneuver area and camp was returned to the ranch, and a smaller Lalamilo Firing Range used until 1953. Since coastal areas were developed into tourist resorts, military areas were moved inland to more remote locations.

In 1989, local botanist Lani Stemmermann sued the U.S. Army with the assistance of the Sierra Club Legal Defense Fund after she observed the bulldozing of endangered species for construction. Before the trial, the Army settled and agreed to restore the developed area. The area continues to serve as a live-fire combat training area in the Pacific theater for all ground forces, as well as hosting local national guard and law enforcement.

== Location ==
The area of 108,863 acres (440.55 km^{2}) is the largest United States Department of Defense installation in the state of Hawaii, or anywhere in the Pacific. The name of the facility comes from puʻu pōhaku loa, which means "long rocky cinder cone" in the Hawaiian Language, although like many other Hawaiian names, the same name has been used for other places on the island. Pōhakuloa Training Area lies in a high plateau between lower slopes of Mauna Kea to approximately 6,800 feet (2,100 m) in elevation and to about 9,000 feet (2,700 m) on Mauna Loa. The training area is about midway between Hilo, on the east coast and the Army landing site at Kawaihae Harbor. It is used by both the U.S. Army and Marine Corps.

The only road access is via the Saddle Road (Hawaii Route 200), which is paralleled by a tank trail. Heavy equipment is either flown into Hilo, or else shipped via barge to Kawaihae Harbor, about 40 miles (64 km) away on the Saddle Road. Because of this remoteness, the area is used mostly for short training sessions.

== Facilities ==
The barracks for about 2,000 troops were constructed in April 1955 from prefabricated buildings used in World War II. The support area includes 600 acres (240 ha) of logistic and administrative facilities. In July 2006 an additional 24,000 acres (9,700 ha) were purchased from Parker Ranch in an area known as Keʻāmuku, which means "cut-off lava" in Hawaiian, from to the 19th century lava flows through the area. Located at 19°50′24″N 155°43′1″W, the realignment of the Saddle Road is planned to bypass the Ke‘āmuku addition. PTA has a 51,000-acre (21,000 ha) impact area used for bombing and gunnery practice, refurbished in March 2009 to allow helicopter training. There are approximately 32,000 acres (130 km^{2}) of land level enough for large maneuvers, more than twice the area available on Oʻahu. Its remoteness allows a wide range of weapons to be used. The US Army's 25th Infantry Division (25th ID) and 3rd Marine Regiment often use the base for four to six-week training periods.

== Bradshaw Army Airfield ==
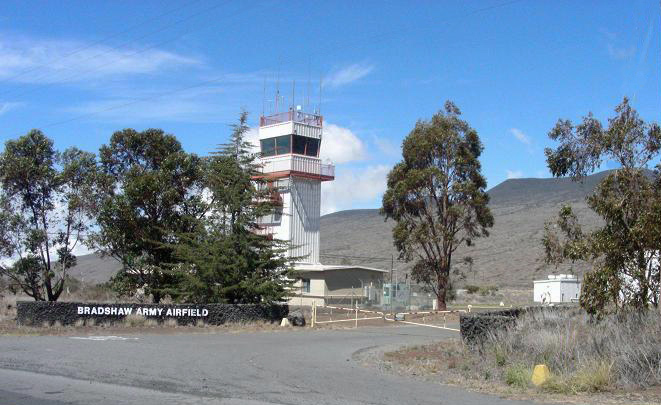
Entrance to Bradshaw Army Airfield

The airstrip was constructed at the area from 1955 to 1956 and dedicated Aug of 1957, by the then Commanding General of the 25th ID. The runway is 3,700 feet (1,100 m) long, which only accommodates small aircraft. Fog often restricts helicopters, which can also fly in from the larger bases on Oʻahu.

== Environment ==
Vegetation varies from sparse grassland and low shrubs to open māmane forest. The volcanic terrain has areas with protected wildlife. Within the borders of the training area, ten different endangered species have been found. These include the native Hawaiian mint honohono (Haplostachys haplostachya) and the shrub 'kio'ele (Kadua coriacea). This area has more endangered species than any other US Army installation. The northeastern portion of the site near Mauna Kea provides habitat for the endangered bird Palila (Loxioides bailleui).

Several archaeological sites have been found in the training area, including the Bobcat Trail Habitation Cave, listed in the National Register of Historic Places. To reduce fire danger and damage from feral goats, areas were fenced.

Weapons such as the Davy Crockett nuclear rifle with dummy warheads and depleted Uranium have been used at PTA. After initial denials, an investigation concluded that spotting rounds were used in the 1960s. Measurements detected radiation, but reportedly not above life-threatening levels.

== See also ==
- Hawaii World War II Army Airfields
