= Lani Jackson =

New Zealand stunt performer

Lani Jackson is a New Zealand stuntwoman best known for her work in The Lord of the Rings film trilogy.

== Filmography ==
- The Lord of the Rings: The Return of the King (2003): Stunt Performer
- The Last Samurai (2003): Stunt Performer
- The Locals (2003): Stunts
- The Lord of the Rings: The Two Towers (2002): Stunt Performer
- Harry Potter and the Chamber of Secrets (2002): Stunt Performer (uncredited)
- The Lord of the Rings: The Fellowship of the Ring (2001): Stunts/Stunt double for Liv Tyler (uncredited)
