= Lani Smith =

American organist

- Born: Kamiki Smith; June 9, 1934; Cincinnati, Ohio, U.S.
- Died: June 24, 2015 (aged 81); California
- Education: University of Cincinnati
- Occupations: Organist, Composer

Lani Smith (1934 – 2015) was an American organist best known for his church music compositions. He served as an editor, composer, and arranger on the Lorenz Publishing editorial staff between 1967 and 1982. During this time, he received composing and arranging credits for over 1000 works. Smith died on June 24, 2015.

Smith was such a prolific composer/arranger that he published under at least seven names: his own, plus the pseudonyms Tom Birchwood, Edward Broughton, Christopher Gale, David Paxton, Gerald Peterson, and Franklin Ritter.
