= Greyskull =

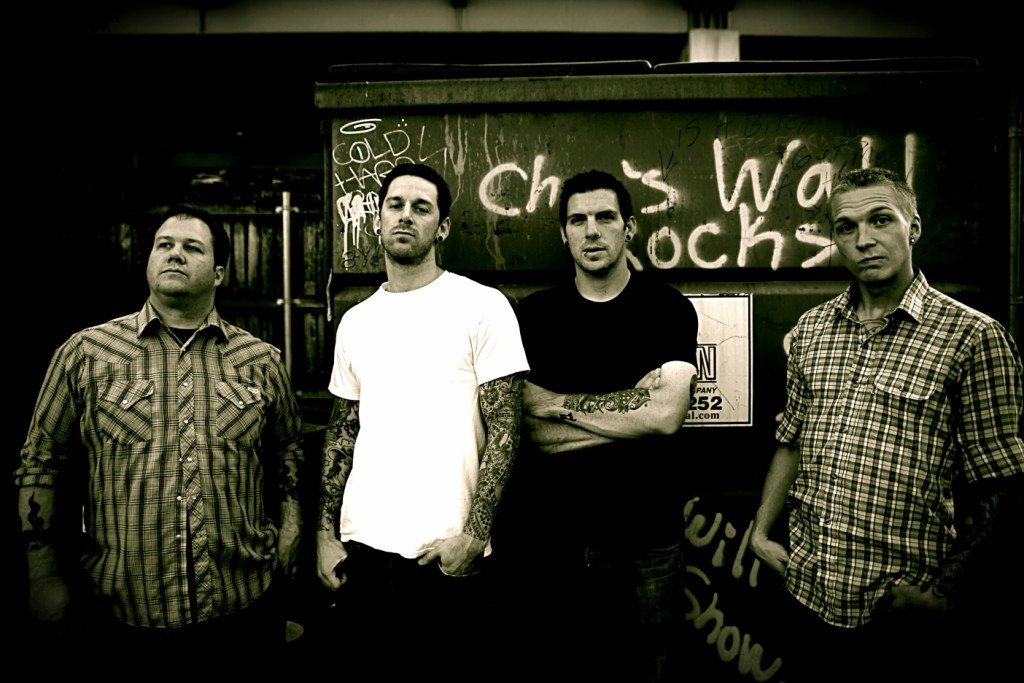
- Greyskull in 2008 (L-R: Kane Kelly, Brad Bevill, Chris Smyers, Robbie Estill)

Background information
- Origin: Dallas, Texas, US
- Genres: Punk rock, pop punk
- Years active: 2001 – present
- Labels: None - Independent
- Members: Chris Smyers; Brad Bevill; Robbie Estill; Kane Kelly
- Past members: Josh Dacus; Roy Hudson

Greyskull are a four-piece Texas punk rock band originating from Dallas, Texas that was started in 2001 by Chris Smyers and Brad Bevill. Rooted in melodic punk rock and old renegade country, Greyskull are influenced by the great bands and artists before them like Social Distortion, Bad Religion, Chris LeDoux, the Ramones and Merle Haggard.

Greyskull have independently released two EP's ("Better Off Dead EP" in 2003 and "Pretty in Ink EP" in 2007) and a full-length album ("State of Ruckus" in 2004).

== History ==
=== 2001-2002 ===
Greyskull was started by Chris Smyers and Brad Bevill in Brad's apartment after Warped Tour in July 2001. The duo, who have been friends since 1993, wrote a song that same day while still learning to play their instruments. After writing songs and coming up with the band name over an IM conversation, they tried for a year to get the band off the ground. Finding a drummer that could and wanted to play punk rock proved to be tougher than expected for the "music scene newbies".

In March 2002 Allan Aguirre (Scaterd Few and Spy Glass Blue), decided to revive his old punk rock band, Scaterd Few, for a new record and a trip to the Cornerstone Music Festival. But Allan needed a guitarist, bassist and drummer to make it happen. A mutual friend connected Chris, Brad and Allan and the same week the Greyskull guys joined Allan Aguirre and Accidental Siren Records for Scaterd Few's last release "Omega No. 5".

From March 2002 until July 2002 Chris and Brad worked with Allan Aguirre to record the album and rehearse for shows. After only a handful of shows in Dallas and a trip to Cornerstone, it was clear that Scaterd Few wasn't going to continue forward, however, the experience with Scaterd Few proved to be exactly what they needed to get Greyskull off the ground. In August 2002 Chris and Brad wrote four new songs and recorded their first demo (Better Off Dead EP) with their new friend Joe Sidoti (who played drums and recorded "Omega No. 5" for Scaterd Few). A few months later they added drummer Josh Dacus and were set to hit the stage.

=== 2003-2005 ===
In March 2003 with the new EP out and some experience on stage Greyskull played their first show ever at Dreamworld Music Complex in Arlington, Tx. The very next night they won a Battle of the Bands contest at The Door in Fort Worth. Kane Kelly filled in on guitar for both of those shows, however, Chris, Brad and Josh played as a three-piece for their next several shows. During the few shows performing as a three-piece, Greyskull met Robbie Estill and Roy Hudson while they were playing in their band, 10w30. Shortly after meeting, Robbie and Roy joined forces with Chris and Brad to form a solid line-up that lasted from July 2003 – 2006.

During that time Greyskull played many shows around Texas and recorded their first full-length album, "State of Ruckus". They teamed-up again with friend, Joe Sidoti, who recorded the 14 song LP in a cabin on the banks of Lake Travis in Austin, Texas. Greyskull then went on to play many shows in support of the full-length album from 2004–2005.

=== 2006-2007 ===
2006 proved to be pretty quiet for Greyskull until Nokia came calling. The mobile phone giant called on Greyskull to be the face of their Nokia N93i campaign in the Asia-Pacific region. As a result, Greyskull wrote and recorded (in November and December 2006) a new EP ("Pretty in Ink EP") for the campaign, as well as, shot two music videos for the Nokia N93i video contest. Greyskull was on all of the advertising (print, TV and online) in eight Asia-Pacific countries (Singapore, Malaysia, Indonesia, Australia, India, Philippines, Vietnam and Thailand). Greyskull was flown to Singapore to perform at the N93i launch event in early January 2007 and went back to Singapore to play the campaign finale concert in April 2007. Footage of Greyskull from that concert was then edited and placed on music television stations in the eight participating markets as a Nokia N93i commercial/Greyskull music video (for the song “Pretty in Ink”). Once back in the States, Greyskull spent the rest of 2007 playing numerous shows around Texas and making radio appearances.

=== 2008-2011 ===
Greyskull laid fairly dormant the years following their big Asia push, and concentrated on writing songs for a new album and played some spot shows around Texas.

== Style ==
In the early days (2001–2004), Greyskull grabbed their style and influence from great 90's punk bands like NOFX, Pennywise, Bad Religion, No Use for a Name and Descendents. As with all bands it took a few years for Greyskull to find their own style, but the band has moved more towards a blues and country influenced punk rock sound. Social Distortion, the Misfits and the Ramones are obviously big influences.

Blue-collar, Texas Punk Rock is how Greyskull likes to describe their sound.

== Band members ==
- Chris Smyers - (July 2001 – present) Lead vocals and Bass guitar
- Brad Bevill - (July 2001 – present) Guitar, background vocals
- Robbie Estill - (July 2003 – present) drums
- Kane Kelly - (March – June 2003, December 2006–Present) Lead Guitar
- Roy Hudson - (July 2003 – November 2006) Lead Guitar
- Josh Dacus - (November 2002 – July 2003) Drums

== Discography ==
- Pretty in Ink EP (2007)
- State of Ruckus (2004)
- State of Ruckus Pre-Release (2004)
- Better Off Dead EP (2003)

== Misc ==
Greyskull chose the winner of $10,000 as part of the Nokia N93i campaign

The track, "Selfish Minds", was chosen as "Track of the Day", "Track Of The Week", "Best Melody in Punk", "Grooviest Rhythm in Punk" and "Chill-Out Track in Punk" on GarageBand.com. Three songs from their debut album ("State of Ruckus") were picked to be used in the MTV Asia teen show “Rouge”. Two songs ("Selfish Minds" and "Less is More") were selected for the soundtrack of the independent film “Celebrity Cult”. The song, "Pretty in Ink", was used in the 2008 independent movie "Fissure". And "Texas Song" was used in the 2008 independent film, "Ungirlfriendable".
