= Dale Thompson =

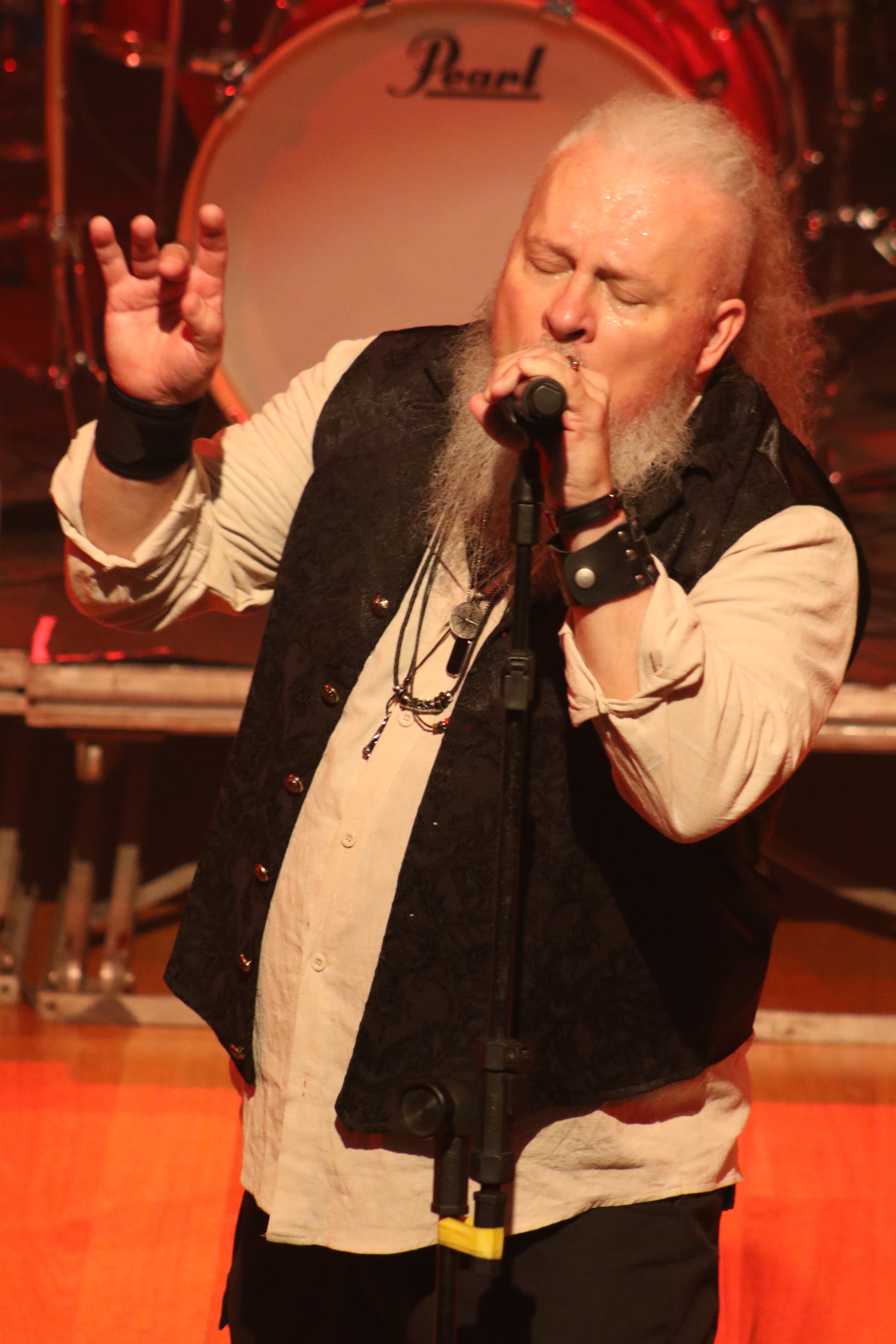

Background information
- Born: Philip Dale Thompson; December 13, 1963 (age 62); West Point, Kentucky, U.S.
- Genres: Hard rock; blues rock; Christian metal
- Occupations: Singer; author; painter
- Years active: 1983-Present
- Labels: Pure Metal; Star Song Records; Rugged Records; Old School Records; Organic Records; Millennium Eight Records; Absolute Records; Retroactive Records; M8 Distribution
- Website: bridepub.com

Philip Dale Thompson (born December 13, 1963) known professionally as Dale Thompson, is an American musician who is the lead singer and co-founding member of the Christian metal band Bride, of which he has been a member since its inception in 1983 until their initial retirement in 2014, and again from 2018-present. Outside of Bride, Thompson has performed in several projects such as Perpetual Paranoia, Dale Thompson & The Boon Dogs, Digital KLL, and Dale Thompson and the Kentucky Cadillacs. In addition to those projects, Thompson has released several solo albums.

Between 1986 and 2013, Thompson released 14 studio albums with Bride, along with five solo albums, before disbanding the group, with the brothers remaining the only two original members throughout Bride's career. In the early years, Thompson was noted for his lyrical tenor range and his powerful and stratospheric voice, as evidenced on early song such as "Evil That Men Do", "Hell No" and "Here Comes the Bride".

== Early years ==
Dale Thompson was born in West Point, Kentucky to Philip Thompson (born August 12, 1944 – present) and Linda Thompson (née Capps, born November 12, 1943 – present). Dale and his brother Troy grew up in the small town of Nichols, Kentucky southwest of Mayfield, Kentucky.

From a young age, the Thompson brothers were immersed in music, growing up playing southern-style church music as part of a gospel group called The Hillview Lads. Despite their eventual transition to rock music, their early musical influences were deeply rooted in Christian albums by artists including Dallas Holm, Larry Norman, Randy Stonehill, and Rusty Goodman.

Their introduction to rock came later, sparked by their exposure to the Resurrection Band and Kerry Livgren's "Seeds of Change" album, which would lay the foundation for their future in Christian rock. Livgren was in the band, Kansas.

== Career ==
Early in his career, Dale and his brother Troy Thompson would operate under the name, Matrix. For three years they honed their craft recording a series of demo tapes. Eventually, their persistence paid off and promoter Dorn Repport secured them a spot opening for the acclaimed Daniel Band in Pottstown, Pennsylvania; the Daniel Band was from Toronto. The official lineup for Matrix included Dale and his brother, Troy Thompson, joined by guitarist Billy Sutherland and drummer Steve Gilbert. The band seized the opportunity to showcase their talent, performing for a crowd of 1,000 people. Refuge Music Group was intrigued by the group's performance after the band sold out of every demo tape they had brought to the event.

The performance led to Refuge Music Group reaching out to the group. Within six months, Thompson and the group rebranded themselves as Bride and signed with Pure Metal Records. According to Thompson, the name Bride was inspired by the Book of Revelation, specifically referencing the Bride of Christ. This change not only marked a shift in their identity but also reflected their desire to shine the Light of Christ into the world. This partnership laid the groundwork for Bridge's entry into the professional music scene. By October 1985, Thompson and the group would enter the studio to record their debut album, Show No Mercy. With a modest budget of $2,500, the band faced significant challenges. One challenge being that the group believed they needed to meet an imminent release date, resulting in an album that, while showcasing their raw talent, suffered from a rushed production and a thin, muddy sound.

In 1988, Bride released Live to Die, widely regarded as one of the standout albums of their early metal era. This release marked a significant evolution in the band's sound, as they began incorporating elements of speed and thrash metal into their compositions, showcasing a more mature and refined musical direction. The album featured several notable tracks, including “Hell No,” “Whiskey Seed,” and “Heroes,” which quickly became iconic anthems within the Christian metal scene. Thompson's vocal performance continued to highlight his impressive lyrical tenor range, adding depth and intensity to the album's themes. Additionally, Live to Die demonstrated a marked improvement in production quality, further solidifying Bride's reputation as one of the most innovative bands in Christian metal at the time.

Around that time, Steve Osborne departed from the group, leaving Dale's brother, Troy, the responsibility of being the lead guitarist. This would result in Dale working with a new lineup for the upcoming album. With Dale remaining on vocals and his brother Troy on rhythm and lead guitars, the group would be rounded out by bassist Frankie Partipilo, and Stephen Rolland on drums, and Rob Johnson, who joined the recording sessions to handle additional lead guitar duties.

In 1989, Thompson and the group recorded and release Silence is Madness, an album marking the end of their strictly metal era. Departing from the speed and thrash metal elements of their earlier work, the band shifted towards a classic metal sound infused with blues influences. Additionally, the lyrics on Silence in Madness were slightly less Christian than previous albums, reflecting Thompson's attempt at a more mainstream approach. Despite these changes, the album retained the band's signature intensity and musicianship. This stylistic change would bring a stronger focus on memorable hooks and hard rock compositions with a bluesy edge.

Around 1990, Thompson became frustrated with the Christian music industry and decide to step away to explore other opportunities within the secular industry. This decision led him to Los Angeles where he joined Thunder Ball, a band featuring Rik Fox, formerly of the group W.A.S.P. For two weeks, Thompson performed with Thunder Ball recording in the studio, gaining invaluable exposure to the California rock scene. Shortly after returning to Kentucky, Thompson began working on a new project with Bride and the result was a musical direction based more in hard rock.

Thompson worked with his brother, bassist Frankie Partipilo, and drummer Stephan Rolland. In 1989 the group recorded Silence is Madness. After their deal with Pure Metal Records was over, Partipilo and Rolland left Bride. The Thompson brothers were joined by bassist Rick Foley and drummer Jerry McBroom. Around that time, the group began working on at least three demo tapes. The tapes included songs such as "Young Love" and "Kiss the Train". The songs were the beginning of a stylistic change, featuring songs which were more blues and hard rock-based.

In 1990, Thompson and the group recorded in a Nashville studio known as the Salt Mine. During that time the group ran into disagreements with producer Steve Griffin. Despite that, the album resulted in Bride entering mainstream of Christian music. In 1992, after the success of Kinetic Faith, Thompson's group was invited to serve as the opening act for Stryper for several U.S. concerts. The experience catapulted not only Thompson, but the other members of Bride into the limelight allowing them to find larger audiences.

Between 1992 and 2000, Bride toured throughout the U.S., Europe, and South America in support of Kinetic Faith (1991), Snakes in the Playground (1992), Scarecrow Messiah (1994), Drop, The Jesus Experience (1995), and their ninth album, Oddities (1998). Throughout that time the band also won four Dove Awards. Three of those were in 1992, 1993, and 1994 for "Everybody Knows My Name" from Kinetic Faith, "Rattlesnake" from Snakes in the Playground, and "Psychedelic Super Jesus" from Snakes in the Playground, all in the Hard Music Song of the Year category. The group received their fourth Dove Award in 1995 for Scarecrow Messiah in the Hard Music Album of the Year category.

== Other ventures ==
Outside of his musical career, Thompson completed the Kentucky State EMT exam and has passed his National Registry test to become a certified emergency medical technician and holds a CCSO certification. In 2025, he secured a publishing contract with Velox Books to write three books surrounding the horror genre. The deal marked a significant milestone in Thompson's literary career, with the first book slated for release in late 2025. Known for blending suspenseful storytelling, Thompson's work aims to push the boundaries of the horror genre.

Thompson was into boxing and weightlifting, and holds two Kentucky bench press records. One is listed for 2004 in the master men category (40-44/198-440), and the second is for 2006 in the master men category (40-44/220-150). He has the title as the "Strongest Man in Kentucky. When asked how he got that title, Thompson responded with, "I hold two bench press records with a max bench of 510 pounds or 31.332 Kilograms. And I did it at age 40." On April 30, 2024, Thompson was commissioned by the Commonwealth of Kentucky and by order of State of Kentucky Governor Andy Beshear as an Honorable Kentucky Colonel.

== Personal life ==
Thompson lives in Brooks, Kentucky, with his wife, Adelinde. They married in 2014 in a private ceremony held in Auckland, New Zealand. Dale Thompson has three children from a previous marriage: Alex, Zachary, and Jordan, with whom he maintains close relationships.

Thompson identifies as a devout Christian and a Universalist, with his beliefs prominently reflected in songs like “End of Days” on the album Skin for Skin, where he explores themes of grace, mercy, and salvation for all. Despite criticism from fundamentalist groups and accusations of heresy, Thompson remains steadfast in his faith, emphasizing the teachings of Christ as the core of Christianity while rejecting rigid denominational doctrines.

== Discography ==
With Bride

Studio albums

- Show No Mercy (1986)
- Live to Die (1988)
- Silence Is Madness (1989)
- Kinetic Faith (1991)
- Snakes in the Playground (1992)
- Scarecrow Messiah (1994)
- Drop (1995)
- The Jesus Experience (1997)
- Oddities (1998)
- Fist Full of Bees (2001)
- This Is It (2003)
- Skin for Skin (2006)
- Tsar Bomba (2009)
- Incorruptible (2013)
- Snake Eyes (2018)
- Here Is Your God (2020)
- Are You Awake (2023)
- Vipers & Snakes (2025)

Compilations and other releases

- End of the Age (1990)
- God Gave Rock 'n' Roll to You (1993)
- Lost Reels I (1994)
- Lost Reels II (1994)
- I Predict a Clone a tribute to Steve Taylor – various artists (1994)
- Shotgun Wedding: 11 No. 1 Hits and Mrs. (1995)
- Lost Reels III (1997)
- Bride Live! Volume I (1999)
- Bride Live Volume II Acoustic (2000)
- Best of Bride (2000)
- Live at Cornerstone 2001 (2001)
- The Matrix Years / Lost Reels (2001)
- The Organic Years (2002)
- Raw 7-track demo (2003)

Solo albums

- Speak into the Machine (1994)
- Dale Thompson and the Religious Overtones (1995)
- Testimony – Dale Thompson and The Kentucky Cadillacs (1998)
- Acoustic Daylight (1998)
- Unbridled (2002)

With the World Will Burn

- Severity (2016)
- RuiNation (2017)
- Nothings As Real As It Seems (2019)
- Burn Baby Burn (2025)

With Perpetual Paranoia

- The Reapers (2018)
- Between the Altar and the Cross (2019)
- Hell Fest (2021)
- The Wave (2023)

With Dabster Gentlemen

- Death or Life (2018)
- Answers (2020)
- The Sun is Up (2021)

With Swingle and Thompson Ordained

- The Thunder That Rocks The World (2020)
- Firestorm (2021)
- When 2 Worlds Collide (2023)
- Wonderous Miraculous (2024)

With No Other God

- Take it By Storm (2019)

With Haunted No More

- Vol. I (2019)
- Vol. II (2020)

With The Thomas Thompson Earth Project

- Dreamland Lovecraft (2020)
- 7 Angels 1 Sad Devil (2020)
- Systematic Brain Drain (2021)
- Resurrection (2024)

With Dominus Meus

- DM1 (2020)
- DMII (2021)

With Iron 501

- Sgt. Reckless (2021)
- Night Witches (2022)
- Underground Railroad (2023)
- Thin Blue Line (2024)

With We Are Resolute

- Shine the Light (2020)
- Only Human (2022)
- Fallen Angel (2023)
- Full Armor (2025)

With The Reconciled

- Skin & Bones (2022)

With Sovereign Cross

- Bow to the Light (2021)

With Not Of This World

- Never Forget (2022)
- I Am With You (2024)

With Digital KLL

- Digital KLL (2025)

Dale Thompson & The Boon Dogs

- Dale Thompson & The Boon Dogs (2020)
- I See Red (2022)
- Unfinished Business (2024)
- Smoke & Mirrors (2025)
