= Don Swartzentruber =

American painter

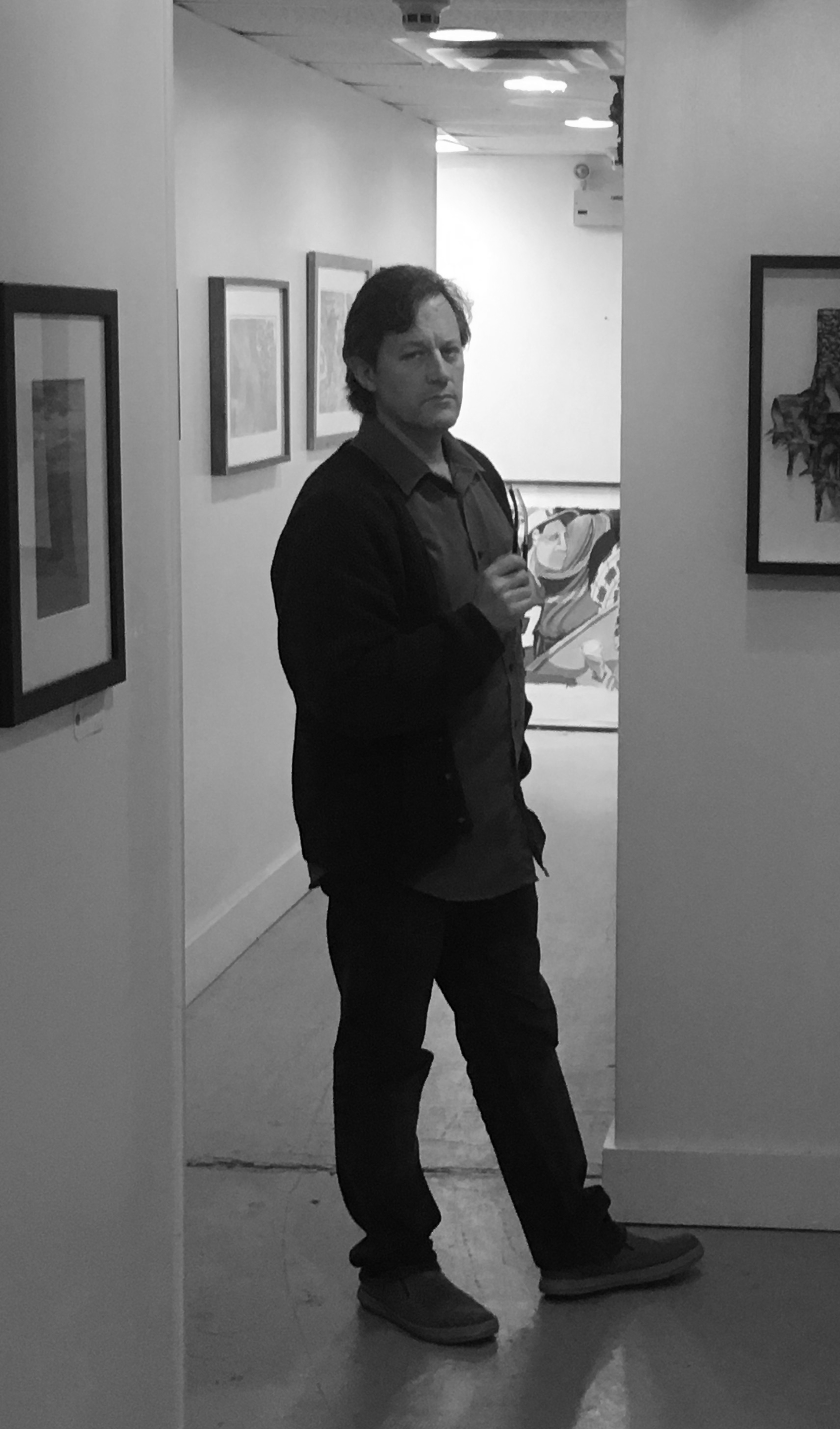
Don Swartzentruber

Don Michael Swartzentruber (swärt-zen-trü-ber) is an American artist who signs with his surname. His painting style has elements of regionalism, neo-pop and surrealism.

His efforts are noteworthy in diverse mediums such as the Pop Mennonite and the Totem Triptychs exhibits, the Silence Is Madness album cover, and carnival caricature portraits. In 2015 he transitioned from narrative painting to sequential storytelling. He is currently writing and illustrating a sizable graphic novel.

== Art exhibits ==
=== Pop Mennonite ===
Swartzentruber was born in 1966 in Greenwood, Delaware. He was raised in a temperate Old Order home and church. While in secondary school he did illustration work for their Amish Mennonite denomination’s publishing house. After Greenwood Mennonite School he briefly attended the conference’s post-secondary institution, Rosedale Bible College, in Ohio. Years later, these foundational years inspired the creation of the exhibit Pop-Mennonite. It is a collection of paintings, drawings, and audio. A soundtrack included a surreal edit of preaching and congregational hymns. It accompanied the 2005 exhibits at Bluffton University and Goshen College Swartzentruber was a significant voice in thematically appropriating Mennonite culture into contemporary art. The paintings were used for numerous book and journal covers. Canadian Mennonite Journal called the art a “jarring juxtaposition of the sacred and the secular.” Mennonite Weekly called it “Weird. Disturbing. Bizarre.” The harshest criticisms of the exhibit came from Mennonite bloggers reviewing the paintings online. In 2023 a series of videos were created describing the artist’s thinking behind Pop-Mennonite.

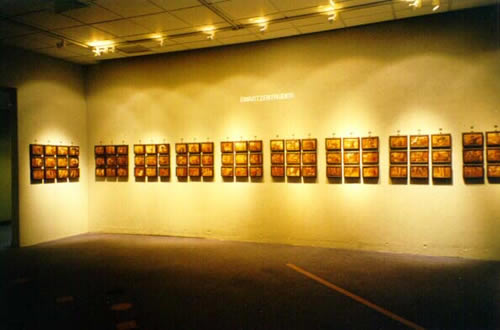
Totem Triptych Exhibit, the Lincoln Center

=== The Totem Triptychs ===
This exhibit is 36 triptychs made up of small oil paintings. The 6” x 8” panels were designed to be interchangeable. 46,656 different compositions can be composed by rearranging the head, body and feet. The paintings were exhibited at Art Space Lima, the Lincoln Center and other museums. Swartzentruber’s preliminary drawings were stream of consciousness, leaving the meaning of the work rather nebulous. In 1998 the images were published online. The artist reached out to the writing community to create reader interpretations. Viewers emailed their submissions. Within days these “texters” could see their post on-line next to the artwork. Most authors added words to an individual painting. Two contributors, Marc Harshman (Poet Laureate of West Virginia), and British wordsmith Cleveland W. Gibson wrote text for all 36 triptychs. Swartzentruber’s idea was an early form of social media. The Totem Triptych collaboration was six years before Facebook, and it was twelve years before Instagram allowed the public to make comments about images. Reader interpretation about online images soon became routine.

=== Facing the Sublime and Grotesque ===
Inspired by the Artists’ book (Livre d’art) movement, in 2004, Swartzentruber created a traveling exhibit. His source for the art was the masks and taxidermy collection at the Chicago Field Museum. The sketches and artwork were created on pages in a scrapbook-like portfolio that could be opened. For exhibition each page could be removed and displayed on a museum wall. An image was used by Disproductions for the covers of poet John Sweet’s book Henry Chalise.

== Sequential artist ==
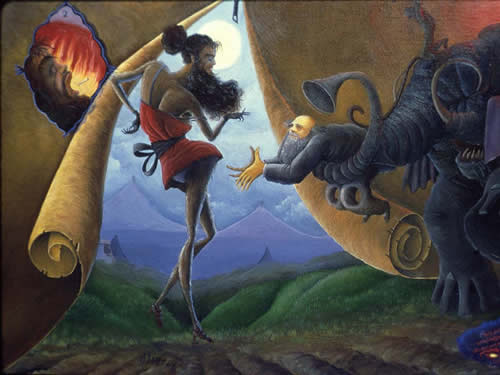
A Deity for Darwin, Oil on Canvas

=== Sermons ===
Religion was a common theme in Swartzentruber’s art. In 2009 he published a Christian apologetics website and videos. The project fell under the title Carnival Sage®. He also held art and religious discussion groups in his home. For twenty years Swartzentruber taught evenings art classes at Grace College and Seminary. During his Visual Narrative classes, he taught students to use illustration as a way to explore religious themes. Some of his classroom demos became fully illustrated sequential short stories. Swartzentruber titled these ink and gauche pages “Sermons.” Eventually they were published in American literary magazines such as Fourteen Hills, Driftwood Press, Forged, Raven Chronicles, Split Rock Review, FreezeRay, Meat for Tea, Show Bear, Helen Literary Magazine, and others.

=== Current work ===
After years of study, in 2015, the artist found counter-apologetics to be the reasonable position. This led the artist to additional years of additional Biblical research. Eventually this inspired the creation of a sizeable graphic novel. After countless rewrites the artist completed the script and storyboards. He resides in the historical Billy Sunday community of Winona Lake and, in 2023, was awarded an Indiana Art Commission grant to move forward on the final artwork.

== Commercial artist and art instructor ==
At the age of sixteen Swartzentruber started earning income by drawing caricature portraits. Over the years he entertained thousands of festival patrons in over a dozen states. He majored in character animation with Disney artist Milt Neil at the Kubert School. After undergrad he earned a MFA in Visual Art at Vermont College of Norwich University and was mentored by Chicago Imagists Karl Wirsum and Don Baum. After art school Swartzentruber briefly worked as a television art director, animator, and illustrator. He was contracted to do album cover art for bands such as “Silence is Madness” by Bride (band) and sequential art for the Penguin Point (restaurant chain). Swartzentruber has trained countless students in drawing, painting and printmaking. He served as affiliate faculty at Indiana University–Purdue University Fort Wayne, Grace College & Seminary and the Fort Wayne Museum of Art. He is an art instructor at Warsaw Community High School. He has been a guest speaker at the University of Notre Dame Center for Ethics and Culture, the Midwest Scholars Conference, and the Art Education Association.
