= Grandmother's Spaceship =

Studio album by Scaterd Few
- Released: 1998
- Genre: Christian punk
- Length: 62:30
- Label: Jackson Rubio
- Producer: Allan Aguirre

Scaterd Few chronology
Out of the Attic (1994)	Grandmother's Spaceship (1998)	Omega No. 5 (2002)

Professional ratings
Review scores
Source	Rating
Hard Music Magazine[1]	[2] with interview
Cornerstone Magazine	(not rated)
7ball	(not rated)
Phantom Tollbooth	(not rated)
Sanctified Press	(not rated)

Grandmother's Spaceship the third a studio album by pioneer Christian punk band Scaterd Few. Lyrically the album is themed, referencing "aliens, the cyber-age and other extra-terrestrial things," while staying centered on the ultimate truth of renewed life in Christ. Several lyrics draw their themes directly from scripture. Musically it is more diverse than most punk albums, encompassing reggae, aggressive punk, funk, and a "slight Gothic overtone" similar to Allan's alternate band, Spy Glass Blue. While at least one critic thought the album "failed to capture the essence" that Sin Disease displayed, most reviews were positive. The album was written over two years and recorded in three weeks.

== Lyrical themes ==
Lyrically, the album paints a cohesive picture of mankind in a technological society. According to Allan because man is separated from God and so has lost his true identity. In this unnatural state mankind tends toward pagan activities, destroying himself through his vices, in an attempt to find his true identity. This condition is exacerbated by the conditions of the 21st century - a world of information overload where "Major Tom is now an info monk." Humans are said to be a "Species filled with anti-matter." Perhaps the clearest expression of this idea is in "Bobby's Song," which tells the story of a family preparing to leave Earth by way of alien abduction. The story is similar to that of the Heaven's Gate cult; one reviewer describes this as "the story of humankind's misplaced yearning for extraordinary salvation from all sources other than the Universal King."

The album's answer is that Christ can restore man to his natural state of communion with God. Allan speaks directly to the world in pleading "Wake up, sleeper!" (echoing Ephesians 5:14, on "Lullaby") and drawing from Mark 1:17 in "Win The Fisher" ("If you follow me, I'll make you fisher's of men.") In Christ Agiurre offers "Death! Where is your sting?!" (from, "Incorruptible", 1 Corinthians 15:55) as a triumphant victory cry over the corruption world.

Grandmother's space theme has been interpreted in two related ways: that believers are "not of this world," and that the world increasingly alienates believers as unwelcome. In this vein "As The Story Grows V.2" is a continuation of the theme set forth on "As The Story Grows" (Sin Disease), and "Space Junk" is most exploratory. These songs restate both questions posed to believers by the outside world (such as "How can you believe in a God that would let small children suffer?"), and the world's angry reply back to Christians ("We love the smell of hell / How dare you try to tell us that / He died to set us free / ...Take your cross and let us be".)

The album also contains elements of praise and worship music, albeit in a punk fashion, which was, according to Aguirre, "a very conscious decision." The best of these are probably "Splendor" and "Arbitrator", which draws from Psalm 139, and was remade by Spy Glass Blue on their 2003 release The Blue EP.

== Track listing ==
1. "Intro"
2. "Space Junk"
3. "Lullaby"
4. "Win The Fisher"
5. "Arbitrator"
6. "Future Love"
7. "Species"
8. "Incorruptible"
9. "Vanishing"
10. "Vanishing Outro"
11. "Suspension My Love"
12. "Bobby's Song"
13. "Twinkling Of An Eye"
14. "Worm Hole"
15. "Splendor"
16. "As The Story Grows (v.2)"
17. "Tomorrow"

== Credits ==
- Allan Aguirre: vocals, Acoustic Guitar, Keyboard
- Russell Archer: Electric guitar, Special Effect, Keyboard, Background Vocals
- Steve Martens: drums, percussion
- Steven Meigs: Bass guitar

Also Featuring:

- Cristina Aguirre: Background Vocals in "Vanishing"
- Corin Aguirre: as Bobby in "Bobby's Song"
- Lee Harbaugh: Trombone
- Diane Morren: as Grandmother in "Bobby's Song"
- Joshua Pyle: Keyboards, Sampling
