= Shadows (Spy Glass Blue album) =

Studio album by Spy Glass Blue
- Released: 1996, September 16, 1997
- Recorded: 1996
- Length: 53:25
- Labels: Pinnacle Records, Organic Records
- Producer: Allan Aguirre

Spy Glass Blue chronology
Spy Glass Blue (1995)	Shadows (1996)	Loud As Feathers (2001)

Professional ratings
Review scores
Source	Rating
Christian New Wave	not rated
Youthworker	not rated

Shadows is Spy Glass Blue's first full-length studio album. It was first released in May, 1996 on Pinnacle Records. Its second release was in September, 1997 on Organic Records.

== Track listing ==
1. "Thin And Leaner"
2. "Lodging"
3. "In Sultry Places"
4. "Can You Feel"
5. "Me Mine"
6. "On And On"
7. "Stygian"
8. "Iron Grey"
9. "Ignorant Side"
10. "Come Patmos"
11. "Should Have"
12. "Tell"

== Personnel ==
- Allan Aguirre: Vocals, Keyboard, Guitars, Percussion
- River Tunnell: Bass Guitars
- Kane Kelly: Guitar
- Kris Rosentrater: Drums
