= Not Perfect =

Studio album by Church of Rhythm
- Released: 1996
- Label: Pamplin

Church of Rhythm chronology
Church of Rhythm (1995)	Not Perfect (1996)

Not Perfect is the second and final album by Christian pop group Church of Rhythm, released in 1996 via Pamplin Records.

== Critical reception ==
Writing for Billboard, music critic Larry Flick praised the album's production and vocals, stating that "this solid collection contains all the elements for success". Mike Rimmer of Cross Rhythms called the album "deep stuff", stating that the band had "grown up lyrically and taken chances musically to ensure the message is heard." John DiBase of Jesus Freak Hideout called it "fun and sensitive", although he criticized the "slight over-polishing on the sound."

== Charts ==
Chart (1996)	Peak position
Top Indie Contemporary Christian Albums (Billboard)	5

== Track listing ==
No.	Title	Length
1.	"Take My Hand"	3:37
2.	"I Believe In God"	3:41
3.	"Faith"	3:53
4.	"Not Perfect"	3:53
5.	"Life Is Worth Fighting For"	3:38
6.	"Strayed"	3:32
7.	"Common People"	3:49
8.	"Where Is God?"	4:23
9.	"Shades of Gray"	4:55
10.	"Matter of Time"	3:50
11.	"And Can It Be"	3:14
