= 27th GMA Dove Awards =

1996 US music awards ceremony

- Date: April 25, 1996
- Location: Grand Ole Opry House, Nashville, Tennessee
- Hosted by: Michael W. Smith

The 27th Annual GMA Dove Awards were held on April 25, 1996 to recognizing accomplishments of musicians for the year 1995. The show was held at the Grand Ole Opry House in Nashville, Tennessee, and was hosted by Michael W. Smith.

== Award recipients ==
=== Artists ===
- Artist of the Year
  - dc Talk
- New Artist of the Year
  - Jars of Clay
- Group of the Year
  - Point of Grace
- Male Vocalist of the Year
  - Gary Chapman
- Female Vocalist of the Year
  - CeCe Winans
- Songwriter of the Year
  - Michael W. Smith
- Producer of the Year
  - Charlie Peacock

=== Songs ===
- Song of the Year
  - “Jesus Freak”; Toby McKeehan, Mark Heimermann
- Rap/Hip Hop Recorded Song of the Year
  - "R.I.O.T. (Righteous Invasion of Truth)"; R.I.O.T. (Righteous Invasion of Truth); Carman (TIE)
  - "Take Back the Beat"; Church of Rhythm; Church of Rhythm (TIE)
- Rock Recorded Song of the Year
  - "Jesus Freak"; Jesus Freak; dc Talk
- Pop/Contemporary Recorded Song of the Year
  - “The Great Divide”; The Whole Truth; Point of Grace
- Hard Music Recorded Song of the Year
  - “Promise Man”; Promise Man; Holy Soldier
- Southern Gospel Recorded Song of the Year
  - "Out of His Great Love"; The Martins; The Martins
- Inspirational Recorded Song of the Year
  - "Man After Your Own Heart"; My Utmost for His Highest; Gary Chapman
- Country Recorded Song of the Year
  - "Without You (I Haven't Got a Prayer)"; Give What It Takes, MidSouth
- Traditional Gospel Recorded Song of the Year
  - "Great Is Thy Faithfulness"; Alone In His Presence; CeCe Winans
- Contemporary Gospel Recorded Song of the Year
  - "The Call"; The Call; Anointed
- Modern Rock Recorded Song of the Year
  - "Monkeys at the Zoo"; Everything That's on My Mind; Charlie Peacock
- Urban Recorded Song of the Year
  - "It's In God's Hands Now"; The Call; Anointed

=== Albums ===
- Rock Album of the Year
  - No Doubt; Petra
- Pop/Contemporary Album of the Year
  - The Whole Truth; Point of Grace
- Rap/Hip Hop Album of the Year
  - Church of Rhythm; Church of Rhythm
- Hard Music Album of the Year
  - Promise Man; Holy Soldier
- Inspirational Album of the Year
  - Unbelievable Love; Larnelle Harris
- Modern Rock Album of the Year
  - This Beautiful Mess; Sixpence None the Richer
- Urban Album of the Year
  - Give Your Life; Angelo & Veronica
- Contemporary Gospel Album of the Year
  - The Call; Anointed
- Traditional Gospel of the Year
  - He Will Come: Live; Shirley Caesar
- Country Album of the Year
  - Where Love Runs Deep; Michael James
- Southern Gospel Album of the Year
  - The Martins; The Martins
- Special Event Album of the Year
  - My Utmost for His Highest; Amy Grant, Michael W. Smith, Sandi Patty, Twila Paris, Point of Grace, Gary Chapman, Cindy Morgan, Bryan Duncan, 4Him, Phillips, Craig and Dean, Steven Curtis Chapman
- Instrumental Album of the Year
  - Classical Peace; Dino
- Praise & Worship Album of the Year
  - Promise Keepers: Raise the Standard; Maranatha! Promise Band
- Children's Music Album of the Year
  - School Days; Mike Gay, Sue Gay
- Youth/Children's Musical Album of the Year
  - Salt and Light (featuring Songs from the Loft); Beverly Darnall
- Musical Album
  - Saviour; Bob Farrell and Greg Nelson
- Choral Collection Album
  - Praise Him... Live; The Brooklyn Tabernacle Choir
- Recorded Music Packaging of the Year
  - My Utmost for His Highest; Loren Balman, Diane Barnes, Jeff and Lisa Franke; Matthew Barnes

=== Videos ===
- Long Form Music Video of the Year
  - Big House; Audio Adrenaline
- Short Form Music Video of the Year
  - "Flood"; Jars of Clay
