= Snakes in the Playground =

Studio album by Bride
- Released: 1992
- Recorded: 1991
- Studio: The Saltmine Studio (Brentwood, Tennessee); West Side Music (West New York, New Jersey)
- Genre: Hard rock
- Length: 46:24
- Label: Star Song
- Producer: Plinky

Bride chronology
Kinetic Faith (1991)	Snakes in the Playground (1992)	Scarecrow Messiah (1994)

Professional ratings
Review scores
Source	Rating
AllMusic	4.5/5 stars
Cross Rhythms	6/10 stars
Jesus Freak Hideout	4/5 stars

Snakes in the Playground is the fifth studio album by American Christian metal band Bride. Seen by critics as the best release of Bride's hard rock era, Snakes in the Playground is commonly known as the breakthrough album in the band's career. This album would produce more touring and press appeal for the band, as well as win Bride two GMA Dove Awards for best song.

In 2010, HM Magazine listed Snakes in the Playground at No. 45 on its Top 100 Christian Rock Albums of All Time list stating that it "best captured the apex of their live energy and great songwriting" and is "a turning point for the legitimacy of true hard rock in the Christian market (as opposed to overly premeditated/watered-down youth group filler). Snakes… was to Bride what Appetite... was to G ‘n R." Heaven's Metal fanzine ranked it No. 9 on its Top 100 Christian metal albums of all-time list.

== Recording ==
Work on Snakes in the Playground began after the band arrived at their home state of Kentucky from the tour that followed their 1991 album Kinetic Faith, with the line-up of Dale Thompson, Troy Thompson, Rick Foley, and Jerry McBroom. Bride spent a great deal of time in pre-production fine tuning its material and eventually came up with two demo tapes of nine songs each. On this album, the band tried to capture their live performance energy, creating a more raw and straightforward hard rock sound compared to Kinetic Faith. The band has said that they did not want to work with the producer Steve Griffith, and ended up working with the New Jersey native, Plinky, who had previously produced for a band called Novella. The album was recorded at The Saltmine Studio in Nashville, Tennessee, and included several guest musicians: Peter Furler and John James from the Newsboys, Rick Florian from White Heart for backing vocals, Greg Martin from the Kentucky Headhunters, Rick Elias, and Derek Jan from Novella for some solo guitar spots. Additional recording was done at West Side Music in West New York, New Jersey. The band has said that they decided to name the album Snakes in the Playground after they had an incident with a large snake at the studio:

We were in the beginning stages of recording, and took a break to drive to the store. A large reptile was lying beside our car sunbathing on the pavement. In my attempts to chase the snake away, I chased it under the car. To make matters worse, the effort to move the snake from under the car drove it up into the fender wells. We spent the next hour and a half trying to get the snake to come out. We sprayed it with the water hose, poked at it with a broom handle, even shook the car, but it would not come out. Finally, when we thought we would just have to let the snake have the car, it crawled out and back into the wooded area next to the studio.

== Overview ==
The album's output is a combination of energetic hard rock numbers such as "Rattlesnake" and "Would You Die For Me," and more hook-laden, faster songs such as "Psychedelic Super Jesus" and "Don’t Use Me" as well as tracks that have elements of the band's metal roots such as "Fall Out" and "Dust Through a Fan." The ballad "I Miss The Rain" has a similar feel as "Sweet Louise," which is the closing song on Kinetic Faith.

Dale Thompson's vocals continues to showcase his raspy and blues based output. Tracks such as "Fallout" and "Would You Die For Me" display his wider vocal range, while the ballad “I Miss The Rain” reflects a calmer vocal style. Troy Thompson's rhythm guitar work is more based on groove, and combines work with the guest musicians Dez Dickerson (Prince), Derek Jan (Novella), and Greg Martin (Kentucky Headhunters) for an abundance of gritty lead guitar work. Other guest appearances are made as background vocalists by Rick Florian (White Heart) and Newsboys, and Rick Elias plays harmonica.

According to Dale Thompson, the lyrics on Snakes in the Playground were inspired by personal experiences and the letters the band received from its fans during the months before recording. The album's lyrics are based upon social problems from Christian point of view. The lyrics deal with subject such as drug abuse, suicide, abortion, gang violence, and other issues.

"Rattlesnake" begins with an intro of a preacher stating, "Jesus is knocking on the door of your heart today" followed by wailing sirens as pounding drums fade away. "Rattlesnake" speaks against those who give drugs to kids in order to turn them into addicts. "Psychedelic Super Jesus" is about a band in Bride's hometown of Louisville that In Dale's words, "They see Jesus as a hippie guru living in the 1960s, but we know that is not who He is."

The band won "Hard Music Recorded Song of the Year" for the song "Rattlesnake" at the 23rd GMA Dove Awards in 1992, and for "Psychedelic Super Jesus" at the 24th GMA Dove Awards in 1993.

== Track listing ==
No.	Title	Lyrics	Music	Length
1.	"Rattlesnake"	Dale Thompson	Troy Thompson, Rik Foley, Jerry McBroom	4:33
2.	"Would You Die For Me"	D. & Alex Thompson	T. Thompson	3:35
3.	"Psychedelic Super Jesus"	D. Thompson	T. Thompson, Foley, McBroom	4:17
4.	"Fallout"	D. Thompson	T. Thompson	4:03
5.	"Saltriver Shuffle"			0:37
6.	"Dust Through a Fan"	D. Thompson	T. Thompson, Foley, McBroom	3:08
7.	"I Miss The Rain"	D. Thompson	T. Thompson, Foley, McBroom	3:52
8.	"Don't Use Me"	D. Thompson	T. Thompson, Foley, McBroom	4:01
9.	"Picture Perfect"	D. Thompson	T. Thompson	4:21
10.	"Love, Money"	D. Thompson	T. Thompson, Foley, McBroom	3:47
11.	"Some Things Never Change"	D. Thompson	T. Thompson, Foley, McBroom	4:09
12.	"Goodbye"	D. Thompson	D. Thompson, Plinky Giglio	5:20

The album contains unlisted instrumental pieces in between select tracks, like an untitled track before "Don't Use Me" and a piano piece before "Goodbye."

== Personnel ==
- Dale Thompson - Lead Vocals, Background Vocals, Tambourine, Shakers
- Troy Thompson - Guitar, Mandolin, Acoustic Guitar, Cello, Viola
- Rik Foley - Bass
- Jerry McBroom - Drums

Additional personnel

- Plinky - Piano and Keys, Background Vocals
- Rick Elias - Harmonica
- Dez Dickerson - Lead Guitar Trade Off
- Greg Martin - Lead Guitar
- Derek Ian - Lead Guitar
- Ricke Florian - Harmony Vocals
- Peter Furler - Background Vocals
- John James - Background Vocals

Production

- Plinky - Produced, recorded, and mixed
- Dez Dickerson - Executive producer
- Alan Douches - Digital editing, additional recording and mixing on "Goodbye"
- Denny Purcell - Mastering

Art

- Art Direction - Toni Thigpen
- Design/Layout - Tufts Design Studio
- Photography - Russ Harrington
- Illustration - Todd Tufts
