= Omega No. 5 =

Studio album by Scaterd Few
- Released: 2002
- Genre: Christian punk
- Label: Accidental Sirens
- Producer: Allan Aguirre

Scaterd Few chronology
Grandmother's Spaceship (1998)	Omega No. 5 (2002)

Professional ratings
Review scores
Source	Rating
Hard Music Magazine	3/5 stars

Omega No. 5 is the latest material by the punk band Scaterd Few. It was released in 2002 on Allan's own label, Accidental Sirens. Unlike on their 1998 release the band returns to its original punk stylings, mirroring Sin Disease in both aureal intensity and lyrical depth. Forming the band on this release are Allan Aguirre and Greyskull members Brad Bevill and Chris Smyers.

== Track listing ==
1. "Run If You Can"
2. "Resistance"
3. "Fair Is He"
4. "This Is..."
5. "Rise Up!"
6. "Parental Advisory"
7. "Anybody - Everybody"
8. "Shark Attack"
9. "Camel Crawl"
10. "Tomorrow"
11. "Only"
12. "Sleeper"
13. "Life Bleeds Out"
14. "Sheol"
15. "Secret - Secret"
16. "Hidden Track"

== Personnel ==
- Allan Aguirre: guitar, vocals, drums
- Brad Bevill: guitar, background vocals
- Chris Smyers: bass, background vocals

Also featuring:

- Letha Gaines: vocals on "Rise Up"
