= Show No Mercy (Bride album) =

Studio album by Bride
- Released: 1986
- Genre: Heavy metal
- Label: Pure Metal Records
- Producer: Bride

Bride chronology
Show No Mercy (1986)	Live to Die (1988)

Professional ratings
Review scores
Source	Rating
CCM Magazine	not rated

Show No Mercy is the debut album by the American heavy metal band Bride. It was the band's debut on the Pure Metal Records label. Less commercial than Bride's later works, the album, which was somewhat more extreme and darker than many contemporary Christian releases, received a mixed reception and did not sell particularly well.

The band line-up for this album was Dale Thompson (vocals), Steve Osborne (lead guitar), Troy Thompson (guitar, keyboards, violin), Scott Hall (bass), and Stephan Rolland (drums).

== Recording history ==
After recording four demo tapes as Matrix over the previous three years, brothers Dale and Troy Thompson got their chance when promoter Dorn Repport arranged for Matrix to open for Daniel Band in Pottstown, Pennsylvania. The Thompsons were joined by guitarist Billy Sutherland and drummer Steve Gilbert to perform for a crowd of 1000. Among this crowd were executives from Refuge Music Group. The band caught the label's attention when the band sold out of all the tapes they brought to the show, which led to the label contacting Matrix. Six months later, the band changed its name to Bride and were signed to Pure Metal Records, Refuge Records' Christian metal-focused imprint established specifically to market Bride.

Bride's budget to record Show No Mercy was $2500. According to the band, when entering the studio in October 1985, they incorrectly believed it had to meet a release date only a month away. The album ended up rushed, with the production being thin and muddy.

== Overview ==
Musically, the album features a dark, heavy metal style with occasional speed metal influences and Dale Thompson's high-pitched and pseudo-operatic lead vocals. Troy Thompson and Steve Osborne handled the album's guitar duties. Dale played bass on eight tracks and Scott Hall performed on the remaining two. Stephen Rolland's drum work, based on traditional metal drumming and lacking double bass, would be heard on the band's following releases.

The album's opening track, "Forever in Darkness," is a fast, rhythm guitar and bass-driven song with an epic chorus. Followed by a minute of lead guitar playing, the song closes hauntingly as Dale repeatedly wails "forever in darkness." "Follow Your Heart" also contains a chorus in which Dale demonstrates a broader vocal range. The song breaks for a brief guitar solo before slowing to several seconds of acoustic guitar. A quiet guitar interlude opens the album's title track, followed by a groovy riff. "Show No Mercy" takes a slower pace with acoustic guitar playing, and the lyrics deal with spiritual warfare: "I am strong and you are weak / Jesus gives me power to defeat / I can't be bought and / won't sell out/ The battle cry is good and loud/ Show no mercy!" "I Will Be with You" starts with spooky keyboards, acoustic guitar, and bass. The song progresses through its verses and reaches its peak at its chorus. "Thunder in the City" combines a fast combination of piano and rhythm guitar before slowing for its first verse. "Thunder in the City" progresses aggressively until it peaks at the chorus. "No Matter the Price" includes some keyboard playing, a brief drum solo, and some melodic rhythm guitar work. The song proceeds slowly through its verses and gains momentum until it reaches an anthemic chorus backed by a powerful guitar riff. Steve Osborne displays virtuosic guitar playing throughout a minute-and-a-half-long instrumental interlude. "The First Will Be Last," a mid-tempo track until its chorus, which contains a touch of vocal harmonies, features a passage narrated by a female voice low in the mix, followed by Osborne's sweeping lead guitar work.

== Track listing ==
1986 Pure Metal Records original release

1. Evil That Men Do (3:37)
2. Now He Is Gone (3:49)
3. Fly Away (4:12)
4. Forever in Darkness (3:43)
5. Follow Your Heart (4:29)
6. Show No Mercy (3:36)
7. I Will Be with You (4:29)
8. Thunder in the City (5:53)
9. No Matter the Price (4:18)
10. The First Will Be Last (4:07)

1999 Millennium Eight Records re-release with six bonus tracks from Matrix and a Bride demo

1. Evil That Men Do (3:37)
2. Now He Is Gone (3:49)
3. Fly Away (4:12)
4. Forever in Darkness (3:43)
5. Follow Your Heart (4:29)
6. Show No Mercy (3:36)
7. I Will Be with You (4:29)
8. Thunder in the City (5:53)
9. No Matter the Price (4:18)
10. The First Will Be Last (4:07)
11. I Can Fly Now [bonus Matrix track] (3:40)
12. What Must I Do [bonus Matrix track] (4:00)
13. Butterfly [bonus Matrix track] (3:54)
14. Missing Children [bonus Matrix track] (4:24)
15. Fright [bonus Matrix track] (3:28)
16. Look at Me Now [bonus Matrix track] (4:12)
17. No Matter the Price [demo] [bonus track] (4:12)
