= 23rd GMA Dove Awards =

1992 US music awards ceremony

- Date: April 9, 1992
- Location: Nashville, Tennessee, U.S.
- Hosted by: Marilyn McCoo and Glen Campbell

The 23rd Annual GMA Dove Awards were held on April 9, 1992, recognizing accomplishments of musicians for the year 1991. The show was held in Nashville, Tennessee, and was hosted by Marilyn McCoo and Glen Campbell.

Twila Paris and BeBe & CeCe Winans received seven nominations each.

== Award recipients ==
=== Artists ===
- Artist of the Year
  - Amy Grant
- New Artist of the Year
  - Michael English
- Male Vocalist of the Year
  - Michael English
- Female Vocalist of the Year
  - Sandi Patti
- Group of the Year
  - BeBe & CeCe Winans
- Songwriter of the Year
  - Steven Curtis Chapman

=== Songs ===
- Song of the Year
  - "Place in this World"; Michael W. Smith, Amy Grant, Wayne Kirkpatrick; O'Ryan Music, Age to Age Music, Emily Boothe (ASCAP/BMI)
- Rap/Hip Hop Recorded Song of the Year
  - "I Love Rap Music"; Nu Thang; dc Talk
- Rock Recorded Song of the Year
  - "Simple House"; Simple House; Margaret Becker
- Pop/Contemporary Recorded Song of the Year
  - "Home Free"; Home Free; Wayne Watson
- Hard Music Song of the Year
  - "Everybody Knows My Name"; Kinetic Faith; Bride
- Southern Gospel Recorded Song of the Year
  - "Where Shadows Never Fall"; Show Me Your Way; Glen Campbell
- Inspirational Recorded Song of the Year
  - "For All The World"; Another Time...Another Place; Sandi Patti
- Country Recorded Song of the Year
  - "Sometimes Miracles Hide"; Sometimes Miracles Hide Bruce Carroll
- Traditional Gospel Recorded Song of the Year
  - "Through the Storm"; Through the Storm; Yolanda Adams
- Contemporary Gospel Recorded Song of the Year
  - "Addictive Love"; Different Lifestyles; BeBe & CeCe Winans

=== Albums ===
- Rap/Hip Hop Album of the Year
  - Mike-E and the G-Rap Crew; Mike-E
- Rock Album of the Year
  - Simple House; Margaret Becker
- Pop/Contemporary Album of the Year
  - For the Sake of the Call; Steven Curtis Chapman
- Hard Music Album of the Year
  - In the Kingdom; Whitecross
- Southern Gospel Album of the Year
  - Homecoming; Gaither Vocal Band
- Inspirational Album of the Year
  - Larnelle LIVE...Psalms, Hymns & Spiritual Songs; Larnelle Harris
- Country Album of the Year
  - Sometimes Miracles Hide; Bruce Carroll
- Traditional Gospel Album of the Year
  - For The Rest of My Life; Mom & Pop Winans
- Contemporary Gospel Album of the Year
  - He Is Christmas; Take 6
- Instrumental Album of the Year
  - Beyond Nature; Phil Keaggy
- Praise & Worship Album of the Year
  - Sanctuary; Twila Paris
- Children's Music Album of the Year
  - The Friendship Company: Open for Business; Sandi Patti
- Musical Album of the Year
  - The Big Picture; Michael W. Smith; Andy Stanley, Robert Sterling; Word
- Choral Collection Album of the Year
  - The Michael W. Smith Collection; Robert Sterling, Dennis Worley; Word
- Recorded Music Packaging of the Year
  - Buddy Jackson, Mark Tucker, Beth Middleworth; Brave Heart; Kim Hill

=== Videos ===
- Short Form Music Video of the Year
  - "Another Time, Another Place"; Sandi Patti, Wayne Watson; Stephen Yake
- Long Form Music Video of the Year
  - Rap, Rock & Soul; dc Talk; Deaton-Flanigen; Deaton-Flanigen
