= Loud as Feathers =

Loud As Feathers

Studio album by Spy Glass Blue
- Released: November 2001
- Length: 49:54
- Label: Accidental Sirens
- Producer: Allan Aguirre

Spy Glass Blue chronology
| Shadows (1996) | Loud As Feathers (2001) | The Blue EP (2003) |

Professional ratings
Review scores
| Source | Rating |
|---|---|
| Cornerstone Festival | (not rated) |
| Cornerstone Magazine | (not rated) |
| The Phantom Tollbooth | (not rated) |
| HM | (not rated) |
| Cornerstone | (not rated) |
| spyglassblue.com | 5 Reviews (not rated) |

Loud As Feathers is Spy Glass Blue's second full-length studio album. Its sound leans toward a "space rock vibe" with David Bowieesque vocals. HM editor Doug Van Pelt lists the standout tracks as "Light Machine" and "Ophelia".

== Track listing ==
1. "Light Machine"
2. "Turn and Remember"
3. "Because of You"
4. "The Dreaming"
5. "Morning Star"
6. "Everything"
7. "Ophelia"
8. "(Looks Like) We Made It"
9. "Song For My Children"
10. "And I Go"

== Credits ==
- Allan Aguirre: Vocals, Keyboard, 12 String Acoustic Guitar, Electric Rhythm & Lead, Percussion
- Kane Kelly: Lead and Rhythm Electric Guitar
- Kristian Rosentrater: Drums, Percussion, Drum Loops
- River Tunnell: 4 and 5 String Bass Guitar
- Produced, arranged, and mixed by Allan Aguirre
- Assisted by Joshua Pyle
