= The Friendship Company: Open for Business =

Studio album by Sandi Patti
- Released: 1991
- Studio: Pinebrook Recording Studios (Studio C), Alexandria, Indiana; Bunny Hop, Sherman Oaks, California; The Dugout, Nashville, Tennessee; Bennett House, Franklin, Tennessee; Hollywood Sound Hollywood, California; Javalina Recording Studios, Nashville, Tennessee; Sound Stage Studio, Nashville, Tennessee
- Genre: CCM, children's music
- Length: 47:22
- Label: Everland, Word
- Producer: Greg Nelson, Ron Krueger

Sandi Patti chronology
Another Time...Another Place (1990)	The Friendship Company: Open for Business (1991)	Le Voyage (1993)

Professional ratings
Review scores
Source	Rating
AllMusic	2.5/5 stars

The Friendship Company: Open for Business is the thirteenth studio and second Children's music album by Christian singer Sandi Patti, released in 1991 on Everland, a Word Records label that specializes in children's music. A sequel to 1989's Sandi Patti and the Friendship Company, this album continues the theme of friendship and with some new animal friends joining Patti at a clubhouse. It also features dialog in between songs telling the story. The Friendship Company: Open for Business peaked at No. 8 on the Billboard Top Christian Albums chart and in 1992, Patti won for Children's Music Album of the Year and her 11th and final Female Vocalist title (an award she has won since 1982) at the 23rd GMA Dove Awards.

== Track listing ==
1. "The Friendship Company Theme" (Claire Cloninger, Mark Gersmehl) (0:45)
2. Fergetti Meets His Friends (3:43) *
3. "Open for Business" (Greg Nelson, Bob Farrell) (3:00)
4. Zig Is Voted Into Office (1:33) *
5. "A Little Bit O' Love" (J. Adams, J. McMahan-Wilson, T. Wilson) (2:51)
6. Zig Loses Her Temper (1:57) *
7. "Manners Matter" (J. Adams, G. Garner-Hart) (3:16)
8. Our First Official Visitor! (4:03) *
9. "The Best of Friends" (D. Clark, R. Mauldin) (3:43)
10. What Kind of Creature Is Beemer? (1:21) *
11. "Underneath Your Wrapping" (J. Adams, J. McMahan-Wilson, Rob Krueger) (2:16)
12. Chairman of Cheerfulness (0:44) *
13. "Lookin' on the Upside" (Greg Nelson, Bob Farrell) (2:49)
14. Noodle Learns to Spell (0:43) *
15. "F-R-I-E-N-D" (Karla Worley, Claire Cloninger, Rob Krueger, C. Sterling) (3:27)
16. Building a Sign (0:34) *
17. "Cooperation Hop" (J. Adams, G. Garner-Hart, J. McMahan-Wilson, C. Sterling) (2:38)
18. Fergetti Blows It (2:19) *
19. "Never Too Long, Never Too Far Away" (Gary Driskell, J. Adams) (4:34)
20. Time to Say Goodbye (0:25) *
21. "The Friendship Company Theme (Reprise) (Claire Cloninger, Mark Gersmehl) (0:31)

(*) - Dialog segments written by Rob Krueger

== Voice cast ==
- Narrator/herself: Sandi Patti
- Fergetti the Elephant and Infield the St. Bernard: Bill Farmer
- Beemer: Jess Harnell
- Zig the Rabbit: Jennifer Darling
- Noodle the Lamb: Russi Taylor
- Children's vocals: Kid Connection

== Charts ==
Chart (1991)	Peak position
US Top Contemporary Christian Albums	8

=== Radio singles ===
Year	Singles	Peak positions
Year	Singles	CCM AC
1991-92	"The Best of Friends"	6

== Accolades ==
GMA Dove Awards

- 1992 Female Vocalist of the Year

Year	Winner	Category
1992	The Friendship Company: Open for Business	Children's Music Album of the Year
