= Kim Dexter =

American Christian musician (born 1968)

- Born: Kimberly Tara Sipus; November 7, 1968 (age 57); Augusta, Georgia
- Origin: Phoenix, Arizona
- Genres: Worship, Christian pop
- Occupations: Singer, songwriter
- Instrument: vocals
- Years active: 1997–present
- Formerly of: Mayfair Laundry
- Website: kimdexter.com

Kimberly Tara "Kim" Dexter (née, Sipus; born November 7, 1968) is an American Christian musician, who plays worship and Christian pop music. She has released two studio albums, So This Is It (2006) and Reaching (2014).

== Early and personal life ==
Dexter was born Kimberly Tara Sipus, on November 7, 1968, in Augusta, Georgia, to Ronald and Carol Sipus (née, Malone), while she was raised in Phoenix, Arizona. She graduated from Scottsdale Christian Academy, then going to Grand Canyon University, majoring in music. She married Paul Dexter, her former band member with Mayfair Laundry and a bassist in the mid-2000s. They have two children, Maggie and Hudson. Dexter resides in Los Angeles, California.

== Music history ==
Her music recording career began in 1997, with the band Mayfair Laundry, before starting her solo music career in 2006. She released So This Is It in 2006 with 7k Records. The subsequent studio album, Reaching, was released on June 10, 2014, independently.

== Discography ==
Albums

- So This Is it (2006, 7k)
- Reaching (June 10, 2014)
