= Pop Mennonite =

Art exhibit

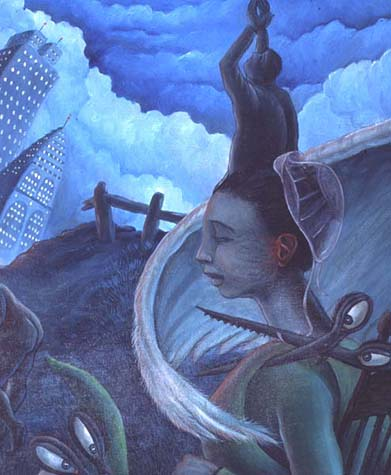
The Last Veiled Feminist (detail)

Pop-Mennonite was a Mennonite-themed art exhibit created by Don Swartzentruber with the support of the National Endowment for the Arts and Indiana Arts Commission. The collection included oil paintings, drawings, artists’ books, and music. The Mennonites are an anabaptist denomination which dates back to the Reformation and advocates a life of modesty and simplicity.

In this art exhibit Swartzentruber addresses pacifism, missions, courtship, adornment, work ethic, and other issues that are held to be important to this religious group. The artist grew up in a Mennonite home and community in Greenwood, Delaware. He pulled thematic material from his own childhood. He uses Amish Mennonite culture as a theme in his contemporary visual art. An audio project accompanied the exhibits at Bluffton University and Goshen College and included Mennonite music.

== Reviews ==
The exhibit provoked some disapproval from Mennonite bloggers viewing the images online. Over all the exhibit was well received.

"Artist presents visual critique, with humor and context, of his native plain culture. Weird. Disturbing. Bizarre. Don Swartzentruber is probably used to the litany of back-handed adjectives used to describe his accomplished and visionary, if decidedly difficult, art. Others, however, especially those who come from a similar Old Order background as Swartzentruber, might also add "offensive" to the mix. ... The collection, which offers a visual critique of Old Order culture, while juxtaposing it with popular comic book imagery, also includes a soundtrack featuring snippets of Anabaptist hymns and tent sermons. The paintings, which show influences ranging from regionalist painters Grant Wood and Thomas Hart Benton to Disney animation, feature a variety of Old Order subjects and scenes presented with surreal twists...In the May 16 Canadian Mennonite magazine, Ilse E. Friesen, an art history professor at Wilfrid Laurier University in Waterloo, Ont., wrote: "[Swartzentruber] portrays the shortcomings of his own ethnic community, confronting and even caricaturing their systemic problems and troubling aspects, so that sins, temptations and depravities are not only characteristic of the secular world outside." Ervin Beck, a retired Goshen English professor who serves on the Mennonite-Amish Museum Committee, said while the collection critiques conservative society, it does so fairly and also emphasizes positive aspects. "It's a provocative exhibit, a provocative work, [but] I think there's also appreciative elements in it," Beck said. "It's the culture he came out of, so he knows it intimately. There's a lot of context there."

Robert Rhodes, Mennonite Weekly Review

"… I found myself drawn into the surreal world of the artist behind the pictures - Don Swartzentruber. It is not a world for the faint of heart, but I've learned some things by visiting it. I've learned, for instance, not to form hasty conclusions when viewing this artist's work. His images have been called bizarre, grotesque, and disturbing, and they often are. But they are that way for a reason. "The work I create is not to shock and not to offend," says Swartzentruber. Rather, he is trying to create a "narrative that will have an impact." He wants to give people something "to wrestle with."…It is far from that, and viewers might even find themselves longing for a little more clarity and reassurance that their world is not really as dangerous a place as it appears to be in the Pop-Mennonite exhibit. … His stated goal was to create "a window, a doorway to dialogue about these issues," and judging from the responses posted in his guest book, he succeeded. Here's a small sample: "Wonderful, provocative and principled. I'll be back"; "Very interesting and thought provoking!"; "Scary, but true"; "Deep thoughts, well conveyed"; "Touched the nerve. Well done!"; and "Back for a second look." Not everyone was pleased: "This is stupid and sick." For some, the jury was still out: "Still thinking." After talking with Don and viewing his artwork, I'm sure he's pleased with that response."

By Vicki Sairs Dream Seeker Magazine
