= Church of Rhythm (album) =

Studio album by Church of Rhythm
- Released: May 1995
- Label: Reunion
- Producer: Peter Bunetta; Rick Chudacoff

Church of Rhythm chronology
Church of Rhythm (1995)	Not Perfect (1996)

Church of Rhythm is the debut studio album by Christian pop group Church of Rhythm, released in May 1995 via Reunion Records. It was produced by Peter Bunetta and Rick Chudacoff.

== Critical reception ==
Mark Allan Powell, writing for the Encyclopedia of Contemporary Christian Music, noted that the album had hip hop and R&B influences, comparing it to Sounds of Blackness and Kool & the Gang. Terry DeBoer of the Kalamazoo Gazette praised the album's "infectious, groove-filled offerings". Tony Cummings of Cross Rhythms called it "a turbulent brew that will sound good when coming from your radio."

=== Awards ===
The album won the award for Rap/Hip Hop Album of the Year during the 27th GMA Dove Awards.

== Charts ==
Chart (1995)	Peak position
US Top Christian Albums (Billboard)	40

== Track listing ==
No.	Title	Length
1.	"Take Back The Beat"	4:37
2.	"Free"	3:48
3.	"I Found Love"	4:10
4.	"Who's Got Your Back"	4:33
5.	"Colours"	3:47
6.	"I Still Believe"	3:50
7.	"Purity"	4:59
8.	"Set Me Free"	3:52
9.	"Change My Mind"	3:54
10.	"It Is Well With My Soul"	3:12
