= 24th GMA Dove Awards =

1993 US music awards ceremony

- Date: April 1, 1993
- Location: Grand Ole Opry House, Nashville, Tennessee
- Hosted by: Barbara Mandrell

The 24th Annual GMA Dove Awards were held on April 1, 1993, recognizing accomplishments of musicians for the year 1992. The show was held in Nashville, Tennessee, and was hosted by Barbara Mandrell.

== Award recipients ==
=== Artists ===
- Artist of the Year
  - Steven Curtis Chapman
- New Artist of the Year
  - Cindy Morgan
- Group of the Year
  - 4Him
- Male Vocalist of the Year
  - Michael English
- Female Vocalist of the Year
  - Twila Paris
- Songwriter of the Year
  - Steven Curtis Chapman

=== Songs ===
- Song of the Year
  - “The Great Adventure”; Steven Curtis Chapman, Geoff Moore
- Rap/Hip Hop Recorded Song of the Year
  - "Can I Get A Witness"; Nu Thang; dc Talk
- Rock Recorded Song of the Year
  - "Destiny"; Unseen Power; Petra
- Pop/Contemporary Recorded Song of the Year
  - “The Great Adventure”; The Great Adventure; Steven Curtis Chapman
- Hard Music Recorded Song of the Year
  - “Rattlesnake”; Snakes in the Playground; Bride
- Southern Gospel Recorded Song of the Year
  - "There Rose a Lamb"; Pillars of Faith; Gold City
- Inspirational Recorded Song of the Year
  - "In Christ Alone"; Michael English; Michael English
- Country Recorded Song of the Year
  - "If We Only Had the Heart"; Sometimes Miracles Hide; Bruce Carroll
- Traditional Gospel Recorded Song of the Year
  - "T'Will Be Sweet"; Testimony; The Richard Smallwood Singers
- Contemporary Gospel Recorded Song of the Year
  - "Real"; When the Music Stops; Daryl Coley

=== Albums ===
- Rock Album of the Year
  - Pray for Rain; Pray for Rain
- Pop/Contemporary Album of the Year
  - The Great Adventure; Steven Curtis Chapman
- Rap/Hip Hop Album of the Year
  - Good News for the Bad Timez; Mike-E
- Hard Music Album of the Year
  - Snakes in the Playground; Bride
- Instrumental Album of the Year
  - Somewhere in Time; Dino
- Praise & Worship Album of the Year
  - Coram Deo; Susan Ashton, Michael Card, Michael English, Out of the Grey, Charlie Peacock
- Children's Music Album of the Year
  - Yo Kidz! Heroes, Stories, and Songs from the Bible; Carman
- Musical Album
  - The Majesty and Glory of Christmas; Billy Ray Hearn and Tom Fettke
- Choral Collection Album
  - Steven Curtis Chapman Choral Collection; Tom Hartley and Randy Smith
- Recorded Music Packaging of the Year
  - Coram Deo; Larry Vigon; Denise Milford

=== Videos ===
- Long Form Music Video of the Year
  - Addicted to Jesus; Carman
- Short Form Music Video of the Year
  - "The Great Adventure"; Steven Curtis Chapman
