= Silence Is Madness =

Silence is Madness

Studio album by Bride
- Released: 1989
- Genre: Classic metal
- Length: 39:11
- Label: Pure Metal
- Producer: Armand John Petri

Bride chronology
Live To Die (1988)	Silence is Madness (1989)	Kinetic Faith (1992)

Silence is Madness is the third album by the American heavy metal band Bride, released in 1989. This was the last album in the band's metal era, as the band began writing more commercial hard rock on the following releases. On Silence is Madness, Bride also tried to achieve crossover success to the secular market, as they wrote slightly less Christian-based lyrics than before. Despite the changes, this album did not sell notably better than their previous releases.

== Recording history ==
On this album, Bride left behind many of its speed and thrash metal elements found on its previous release and adopted a more straightforward classic metal sound with blues influences. The albums put more focus on hooks, as displayed in songs such as "Fool Me Once," "Hot Down South Tonight," and "Under the Influence." In contrast to that, "Evil Dreams," "All Hallow’s Eve," and "No More Nightmares" represent a more haunting atmosphere. Bride also introduced a blues influenced hard rock song in "Rock Those Blues Away."

Lead vocalist Dale Thompson continues to bring his high pitched and at times operatic lead vocal style. The lead guitarist Steve Osborne left the band before recording this album, and Troy Thompson handles mostly the lead guitars on Silence is Madness. Troy displays guitar solos on four of the album's tracks, and the guitarist Rob Johnson delivers lead guitar on the five others, notably on "Evil Dreams" and "No More Nightmares." Bassist Frankie Partipilo and drummer Stephan Rolland handled the rhythm section. The album's production was similar to their previous works, but this time they commissioned original artwork. The cover watercolor illustration was created by artist Don Swartzentruber.

== Overview ==
"Fool Me Once" is a straightforward heavy metal song that criticizes televangelists in a manner that they only want to make money and get richer by fooling people to do what the televangelists want and cause damage that way. The output of "Hot Down South Tonight" is based on blues and groove driven metal sound. The song is about a girl who became a star but the success made her lose her soul. The title song contains a whispered intro similar to that of "Heroes" from the previous album. "Until the End We Rock" is a more calmer, slower track. "Evil Dreams" is characterized by a haunting feel, combined with hard rock rhythm guitar and blues rock type lead guitar work. A short vocal part in the middle is reminiscent of hip hop. The lyrics of "Evil Dreams" talk about achieving power but then finding how it only deceives man, and only causes grieving. "Under the Influence" puts more emphasis on groovy metal output. The song is about self-control on various issues such as drinking alcohol. "All Hallow’s Eve" was written around the time the band was known as Matrix, and is one of the few tracks on the album to feature thrash metal influences reminiscent the songs on Live to Die. Containing a slightly doom metal type riff, an anthem-like riff, and a chorus of haunting combination of vocal harmonies, "All Hallow’s Eve" talks about the dangers within the possible true meaning of Halloween, that the costumes and trick-or-treating leads children to mystical deceits. "No More Nightmares" is a more up-tempo song, and "Rock Those Blues Away" is a blues rock driven hard rock track, reminiscent of the works of Glenn Kaiser Band and Darrell Mansfield. The song incorporates a harmonica with some organ playing. The lyrics have a cheerful attitude and talk about a person who has learned to stand on his own.

== Track listing ==
1. "Fool Me Once" – 3:57
2. "Hot Down South" – 3:10
3. "Silence Is Madness" – 5:15
4. "Until The End We Rock" – 3:10
5. "Evil Dreams" – 4:04
6. "Under The Influence" – 4:03
7. "All Hallow's Eve" – 5:10
8. "No More Nightmares" – 4:12
9. "Rock Those Blues Away" – 5:35

== Personnel ==
- Dale Thompson – vocals
- Troy Thompson – guitars
- Frankie Partipilo – bass
- Stephen Rolland – drums

=== Guest musicians ===
- Rob Johnson – guitars
- John Caruso – bass on "Under The Influence"
- Armand Jon Petri – keyboards
- Bill "Bolan" Scott – harmonica
