= Pamplin Music =

Record label

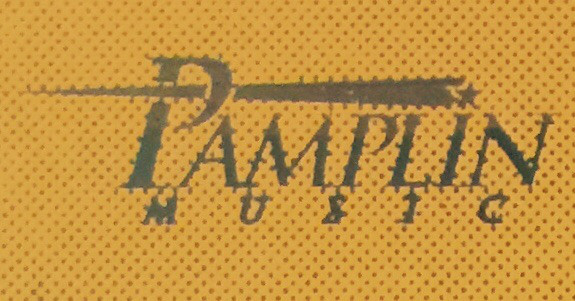
- Parent company: Pamplin Entertainment
- Founded: 1995
- Founder: Robert B. Pamplin Jr.
- Defunct: 2001
- Status: Defunct
- Genre: Christian
- Country of origin: U.S.
- Location: Portland, Oregon

Pamplin Music was an independent Christian record label founded in 1995 by Robert B. Pamplin Jr. The label was a subunit of Pamplin Entertainment and in turn Pamplin Communications, which was already established in the Christian media market through book stores and video products.

Pamplin Music reported turning a profit in 1999 as well as being in the top five Christian music record labels. Despite this, Pamplin closed at the end of 2001, shuttering both its production and distribution operations.

Pamplin focused on the pop, soft rock, and R&B market segments. For other segments, they used sublabels. Red Hill Records, established in 2000 with A&R handled by Dan Michaels (according to Billboard), focused on electronic and pop music, and was generally aimed at the youth market. Organic Records was their label for alternative and modern rock artists. Cathedral Records and Crossroads served the gospel market segments. Cathedral did not close with the other sublabels, and established distribution through New Day Distribution.

== Distribution ==
While previous releases from parent company Pamplin Entertainment such as the Bibleman series had used existing distribution channels, with the establishment of Pamplin Music, the company began distributing its own material. In 1997 they began providing services to other labels as well. Distributed labels include:

- Audience Records
- Calvary Chapel Music
- Discovery House Music
- Infiniti Records
- KMG Records
- Maranatha!
- Rustproof Records
- Sonlite
- Tyscot

== Artists ==
Pamplin Records

- Acquire the Fire
- Billy Batstone
- Charles Billingsley (formerly of Newsong)
- The Channelsurfers
- Church of Rhythm
- The Darins
- Jody Davis
- John Elefante
- Kevin Jackson (formerly of Chase)
- Rick Elias
- Scott Faircloff
- Five O'clock People
- Vestal Goodman
- Natalie Grant
- Tracy Harris
- Timothy James Meaney
- Nikki Leonti
- Lloyd
- Sara Paulson
- Phatfish
- Sierra
- Solomon's Wish
- SpinAround
- Melissa Tawlks (formerly of Acquire the Fire)
- Truth
- Two Or More
- Jeni Varnadeau (currently known as Alexa James)

Organic Records

- Bride
- The Channelsurfers (aka The Channel Surfers)
- The Corbans
- The Frantics
- Human
- Jesus Music
- Mayfair Laundry
- Sappo
- Say-So
- Scarecrow and Tinmen
- Split Level
- Aaron Sprinkle
- Spy Glass Blue
- Stereo Deluxx
- This Train
- Dale Thompson
- Tragedy Ann
- The World Inside

Red Hill Records

- Ash Mundae
- Aurora
- The Echoing Green
- Katy Hudson (currently known as Katy Perry)
- Kindred Three

Audience Records

- Jason Ingram Band
- Everett Darren
- Selena Bloom
- Moriah
