= Church of Rhythm =

American Christian pop band

- Origin: Chicago, Illinois, United States
- Genres: Christian pop; rock
- Years active: 1992–1999
- Labels: Reunion; Pamplin
- Past members: Jason Gregory; Max Hsu; Carlton Coleman; Nathan Clair; Dave Ghazarian; Paul Shamoun; Jerome Cunningham; Matt Miller

Church of Rhythm was an American Christian pop band from Chicago, Illinois, active from 1992 until 1999.

== History ==
During 1992, singer and guitarist Max Hsu, founder of Superchick, created the group in Willow Creek Community Church, with his friends Jason Gregory, Carlton Coleman, and Nathan Clair. This initial lineup featured Gregory, Coleman, and Hsu singing, while Clair played keyboards. During 1993, Church of Rhythm went to Milwaukee to release a demo tape, expecting to get signed to a record label, but success was limited. However, when Hsu released a music video for "Take Back the Beat", several labels were interested in the band.

By late 1994, the band would be signed onto Reunion Records, who planned to debut them during the middle of 1995. They would release their self-titled debut album during May 1995, which sold over 50,000 copies and peaked at number 40 on the US Top Christian Albums during August that year. It was later rereleased on October the same year as Only the Funky: The Collective Remixes of Church of Rhythm, a remix consisting of dancehall versions of the album's songs.

Clair and Coleman left the band by early 1996, citing personal reasons; Gregory exited soon after, in August that year. They were replaced by Matt Miller on drums, Paul Shamoun as a vocalist and percussionist, Dave Ghazarian playing guitar, and Jerome Cunningham as a bassist. Around that time, the band stopped using backing tracks, transitioning into a live band. They released their second and final album. Not Perfect, in 1996, promoting it by holding concerts throughout the United States. The band eventually disbanded in 1999.

== Discography ==
- 1995: Church of Rhythm (Reunion)
- 1995: Only the Funky: The Collective Remixes of Church of Rhythm (Reunion)
- 1996: Not Perfect (Pamplin)
