= Mayfair Laundry =

US musical group

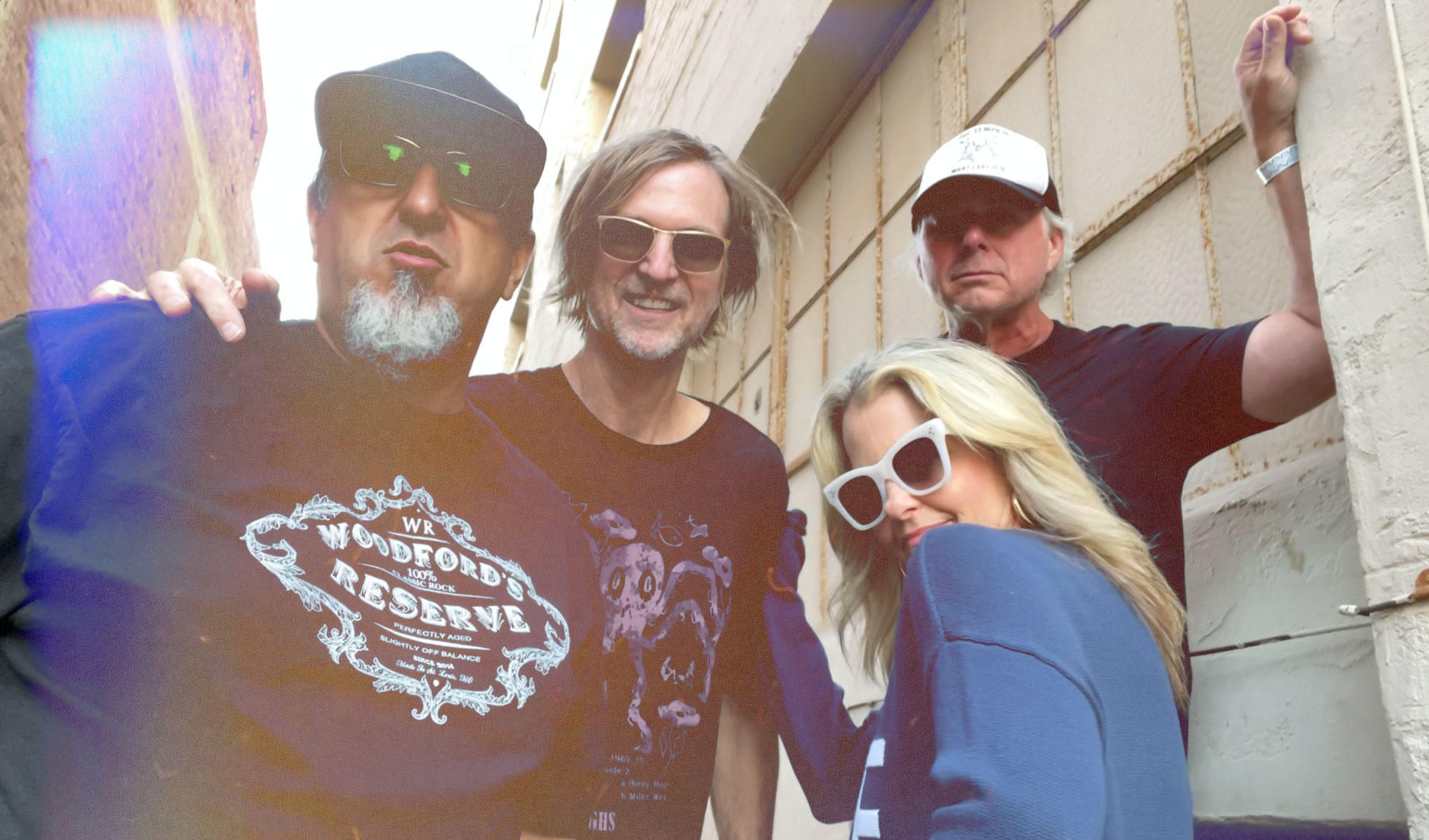
- Mayfair Laundry in 2022

Background information
- Origin: Los Angeles, California
- Genres: Rock; Alternative; Christian rock; Christian ska; Christian alternative rock; Christian pop
- Years active: 1996–
- Label: CatBeach Music
- Members: touring: Bryan Fields; Duane Stephenson
- Past members: Kim Sipus Dexter; Shannon Woolner; Frank Sandoval; Paul Dexter; David Snow
- Website: web.archive.org/web/20100516082518/http://mayfairlaundry.com/

Mayfair Laundry Is an American rock band from Los Angeles, California, who started making music together in 1996. They released two studio albums, Scrub (1998) and New and Improved (1999). They then took a 20+ year hiatus while exploring solo projects, production work, and more. In 2022 they reunited to release their first new music in many years.

== Background ==
The band originated in Los Angeles, California, in 1996, with their members being vocalist Shannon Woolner, guitarist, Frank Sandoval, bassist, Paul Dexter, and drummer, David Snow, while they would remain together for the first album. Their second album was made with vocalist Kim Sipus Dexter, while bringing in Steve Latanation and Mark Stitts in the studio to perform other instruments.

== Music history ==
Their first studio album, Scrub, was released on April 28, 1998, by Organic Records. While the second studio album, New and Improved, was released by Planet Records, on December 14, 1999.

== Members ==
=== Former members ===
- Kim Sipus Dexter
- Shannon Woolner
- Frank Sandoval
- Paul Dexter
- David Snow

== Discography ==
Studio albums

- Scrub (April 28, 1998, Organic)
- New and Improved (December 14, 1999, Planet)
