= Kinetic Faith =

Studio album by Bride
- Released: 1991
- Genre: Hard rock
- Length: 42:56
- Label: Star Song
- Producer: Steve Griffin

Bride chronology
Silence is Madness (1989)	Kinetic Faith (1991)	Snakes in the Playground (1992)

Professional ratings
Review scores
Source	Rating
Cross Rhythms	10/10 stars

Kinetic Faith is the fourth album by the American heavy metal band Bride, released in 1991. This album was the band's first release on the Star Song label, and started the band's hard rock era, leaving straightforward metal behind and focusing on a more commercial sound. The band tasted success with the song "Everybody Knows My Name" which won them a GMA Dove Award, and "Sweet Louise" was a Christian radio hit. The following album, Snakes in the Playground, would become a commercial success.

== Recording history ==
The origin of Kinetic Faith traces back to the time between the release of the band's albums Live to Die and Silence is Madness when vocalist Dale Thompson decided to pursue a secular career because he was growing tired with the Christian music industry. Dale became involved in a California-based band called Thunder Ball with the experienced Los Angeles scene bass player Rik Fox and performed concerts for two weeks as well as spent some time in the studio. while working with Rik Fox, Thompson was introduced to several bands whose roots date back to Led Zeppelin and Deep Purple. After finishing the studio work with Thunder Ball, Dale decided to return to Kentucky and continue working a new project with Bride. The result of his experience in California impacted that Thompson would turn Bride's musical direction to more straightforward hard rock, influenced by Led Zeppelin and Deep Purple.

Dale Thompson again began working with his brother Troy, bassist Frankie Partipilo and drummer Stephan Rolland, and in 1989 recorded Silence is Madness. After the record deal with Pure Metal Records ended, Partipilo and Rolland departed Bride. Dale and Troy Thompson were joined by the bassist Rick Foley and drummer Jerry McBroom. They began working on new material, and recorded 3 demo tapes which included songs such as "Young Love" and "Kiss The Train". These songs introduced a more blues based hard rock output. Around this time the band was informed by Dez Dickerson, an executive at Star Song records, that Star Song had bought rights for the Refuge Music Group's back catalog, including Bride's first three albums. The label and wanted to release a "Best Of Bride" compilation and wanted Bride to record two new songs for it as well. Two songs were selected: "Everybody Knows My Name" and "Same Ol' Sinner". End of the Age: The Best of Bride was released in 1990 and both songs were big hits: "Everybody Knows My Name" stayed at the #1 position on Christian metal radio for twelve weeks and "Same Ol' Sinner" held the same spot for ten weeks. Although the label was not planning to take Bride into its roster at first, after negotiating with Dale Thompson both Dez and Mike Kyle of Star Song signed a multi-album deal for the band.

Kinetic Faith was recorded in a studio in Nashville called the Salt Mine. Although the band ran into disagreements with the producer Steve Griffin, the album put Bride in the mainstream of Christian music.

== Overview ==
Kinetic Faith was a drastic departure from the music on Bride's first three albums, abandoning the previous classic metal, speed metal and thrash metal roots. Kinetic Faith has a hard rock sound with elements from traditional rock and roll and blues, reflecting influences of groups such as Aerosmith, Guns N' Roses, Dangerous Toys, Mötley Crüe and Kix. Dale Thompson abandoned most of his high pitched wails, taking a more controlled and even approach with raspy and blues flavored parts. Troy Thompson incorporates bluesy licks, and Rob Johnson plays some lead and rhythm guitar parts as a guest musician. The previous double bass drum efforts were replaced with a more groove oriented drumming by Jerry McBroom.

"Everybody Knows My Name", "Hired Gun, "Mountain", and "Ever Fall in Love" all feature acoustic laced hard rock sound, while "Troubled Times" and "Ski Mask" move in a more guitar driven direction. "Ever Fall in Love" and "Young Love", deliver up-tempo hooks and stand create tension to album closer "Sweet Louise", an acoustic based rock and roll ballad.

Lyrically, the album deals with social issues from Christian perspective. The album opener "Troubled Times" deals with bigotry and racism, "Everybody Knows My Name" tells the story of a man who gained fame and riches through music but found that in the end all he had in life was worthless without God; "Crimes Against Humanity" tells that all men are guilty of crimes against humanity by neglecting the homeless and poor; "Ski Mask" talks about a man who was a criminal but in the end found God; The lyrics to "Kiss The Train" includes an anti-suicide message. "Hired Gun" is about an assassin, the band explains a certain line inte lyrics on the liner notes:

The assassin always poses this question to his victims – "Hope you and Jesus have it all worked out." This is the same question that God will ask you when you stand before Him to give an account of your life.

== Personnel ==
- Dale Thompson – vocals
- Troy Thompson – guitars, mandolin
- Rick Foley – bass
- Jerry McBroom – drums

=== Guest musicians ===
- Rob Johnson – guitars, mandolin

== Track listing ==
1. Troubled Times 4:28
2. Hired Gun 4:29
3. Ever Fallen In Love 4:35
4. Love On The Mountain 4:12
5. Ski Masks and Hand Guns 4:30
6. Everybody Knows My Name 4:23
7. Young Love 3:30
8. Kiss The Train 3:57
9. Crimes Against Humanity 4:05
10. Sweet Louise 4:42
