= Penguin Point (restaurant chain) =

American fast-food restaurant chain

- Type: Subsidiary
- Industry: Restaurant
- Founded: 1950
- Founder: Wallace and Mary Stouder
- Defunct: 2023
- Headquarters: Warsaw, Indiana
- Area served: Northern Indiana
- Products: Burgers, fried chicken, tenderloin sandwich, fries, drinks, salads, seafood, and shakes.
- Parent: US Assets, Inc.
- Website: www.penguinpoint.com

Penguin Point Restaurant Group LLC, commonly referred to as Penguin Point, was an American regional fast-food restaurant chain that was mainly located in Northern Indiana. Founded by Lloyd Stouder and Heleta Stouder who then brought Lloyd's brother Wallace Stouder and wife Mary Stouder, into the business. The first restaurant was opened in Wabash, Indiana. After the restaurant chain was purchased by US Asset in Texas, the restaurant chain began to expand to other areas.

== History ==
=== Northern Indiana ===
On June 6, 1950, Lloyd and Heleta Stouder founded Penguin Point and opened their first store at Wabash, Indiana. They then brought Lloyd's brother Wallace Stouder into the business as partners. The restaurant was originally a carhop drive-in, and only operated during the summer. In 1961, the original owners gave ownership of the company to their brothers, Lloyd Stouder and Heleta Stouder. Wallace Stouder became CEO of Penguin Point after the transfer of ownership.

In spring of 2018, the restaurant chain was purchased by US Assets, Inc., a company located in Dallas, Texas. Meier was promoted to CEO after the acquisition. The new owner wanted to try out new changes to the restaurant. This first change was the start of selling breakfast foods to people. This idea was started in the Penguin Point restaurant in Warsaw, Indiana. In the fall of 2020, new restaurants were opened in North Manchester and Columbia City, Indiana.

=== Beyond Northern Indiana ===
Before US Assets acquired Penguin Point, a few Penguin Point restaurants were opened in Florida, Michigan, Ohio, and Texas. However, the restaurants eventually closed.

In May 2019, a Penguin Point restaurant was planned to be opened on Fayetteville, Arkansas. The restaurant officially opened on May 8, 2019. In August 2019, Penguin Point announced that another restaurant was planned to be opened at Owensboro, Kentucky and Louisville, Kentucky, along with another location in Jacksonville, North Carolina.

=== Closing ===
In November 2022, US Assets suddenly closed 7 locations, leaving 9 still in operation throughout Northern Indiana. However, those remaining locations permanently closed on November 12, 2023, citing economic challenges.

== Products ==
Penguin Point primarily served burgers and chicken. They also served fish, pork, french fries, and salads. The company named their burgers "Wally", which were named after the former owner Wallace Stouder, and they featured the chain's signature "Wally" sauce. The chain was most famous for serving the pork tenderloin burger. Along with this, the chain introduced fish to the menu.

Before the acquisition, their menu had changed little since 1950. This was due to poor reception of new food offerings when the restaurant tried to introduce them. For example, Penguin Point used to have sandwich wraps as part of their menu. However, due to poor sales, they were permanently removed from the menu.
