= Scaterd Few =

American Christian punk band

- Origin: Burbank, California, United States
- Genres: Punk rock, Christian punk
- Years active: 1983–1985, 1989–1995, 1997–1998, 2001–2002
- Labels: Accidental Sirens; Flying Tart; KMG; Jackson Rubio; SOPA; Alarma; Frontline
- Past members: Allan Aguirre; Paul Figeuro; Jamie Mitchell; Omar Dömkus; Sam West; Chris Smythers; Brian Bevill; Russell Archer; Steven Meigs; Steve Martens; Drew Dömkus; Allen Pellerin

Scaterd Few was a Christian punk band originating from Burbank, California. CCM magazine described their music as "pure punk for dread people," stating that it was a cross between Jane's Addiction and Charlie Mingus.

== History ==
=== Sin Disease era ===
Scaterd Few initially existed from 1983 until 1984 with a brief stint in 1985. Led by Allan Aguirre, then known as Rämald Domkus, the band recorded an 11-song demo with Terry Scott Taylor (of Daniel Amos fame) as producer in June 1983. Some of the material from this time was later released on their album Out of the Attic. Being unable to sell the material at the time, Scaterd Few went on hiatus in 1985 and Allan left to produce music with another band, Cygnet. This band became the blueprint for Allan's later goth-themed work, Spy Glass Blue.

In 1989, Allan began work on Scaterd Few material again with brother/original bassist Omar Domkus. Working with Terry Taylor and Gene Eugene, their first new material was released in 1990 on Alarma Records. Sin Disease was critically well received, though its lyrical content and rumors (of being Rastafarian and not traditional Christian) caused a national pull from Zondervan. The band played Christian festivals such as Cornerstone, but they did not limit themselves to Christian venues. They toured with artists such as Bad Brains, and would play at explicitly non-Christian events such as an Earth First event. The band ran into further trouble in 1991 when, in an interview, Aguirre admitted to smoking marijuana. These factors led to the band being dropped from Alarma's roster.

=== Indie existence ===
Their next effort at making an album, which eventually resulted in the 1994 release of Jawboneofanass, was a direct result of the aftermath of Sin Disease. The album was recorded three times. The first time, the band again worked with Gene Eugene and Terry Taylor. This recording was made for the general market under the auspices of Vox Vinyl. The second recording was done with Dave Hackbarth (of the band Undercover) and Terry Taylor for Mike Knott's Blonde Vinyl. Neither of these versions were released. The third version was produced independently with assistance from Mark Rodrieguez of Mortal / Blood fame.

The release coincided with the release of Out of the Attic on Flying Tart Records. Out of the Attic is a compilation of material from Scaterd Few's early existence - the 1983 to 1984 time frame. The release shows the roots of Scaterd Few in early 1980s punk rock. The sound is raw and rough, but clearly shows the origin of many of the Few's later sounds.

In the winter of 1995, their manager, Tim Cook, secured a recording contract with Tooth & Nail Records. Artistic direction and personality differences between members caused the band to part ways in early 1996. Allan immediately started working on new material and Spy Glass Blue was officially born.

In 1998, Allan once again rebuilt Scaterd Few with an all new lineup, and Grandmother's Spaceship was released on Jackson Rubio.

Their most recent material, Omega No. 5, was released in 2002 on Allans' own label, Accidental Sirens.

== Style ==
Though a Christian band, Scaterd Few's song lyrics sometimes address topics that many Christians feel are inappropriate for Christian music. Scaterd Few never received any significant music industry awards, and received relatively little attention in mainstream media. The themes of their lyrics fall into two broad categories: Christianity and human behavior. Christianity themes include sin as a disease and humanity's need for salvation ("Beggar", "While Reprobate", "Run If You Can", and "Wonder Why"), humankind's vs. God's understanding ("Beggar", "Life Bleeds Out", "Holding Stare", "Self", and "Pinnacle"), and a person's need for growth as a Christian ("Sleeper" and "Lullaby"). Human behavior themes include gang violence and racial issues ("Lights Out"), drug use ("Glass God (No Freedom In Basing)"), sexual immorality ("Sheets", "Future Love", "Secret - Secret", and "Resistance"), and religious sects, witchcraft, and apostasy ("Pinnacle", "Witchcraft", "Resistance", and "Self").

Their sound was derived from the Los Angeles punk rock scene of the 1980s, and has been described as a "Shotgun wedding between complex musicianship and scathing punk rock". Their Sin Disease-era musical influence would primarily be Bad Brains.

== Members ==
Early era

- Allen Pellerin – vocals (1983–1984)
- Omar Dömkus – bass (1983–1985, 1989–1995)
- Allan Ramald Aguirre Dömkus – guitar (1983–1985, 1989–1995, 1997–1998, 2001–2002)
- Drew Dömkus – keyboards (1983–1985)
- Paul Figuero – guitar, keyboards (1983–1985)
- Lou Becaria – guitar (1983)
- Andy Zachari – guitar, drums (1984)
- Ben Eshbach – guitar (1984–1985)
- Brian Anderson – drums (1983)

Sin Disease lineup

- Allan Ramald Aguirre Dömkus – vocals, guitar, keyboards, percussion (1983–1985, 1989–1995, 1997–1998, 2001–2002)
- Ed "Lover" Evans – guitar (1989–1990)
- James Mitchell – guitar, vocals (1990–1992)
- Omar Dömkus – bass guitar, vocals (1983–1985, 1989–1994)
- Sam West – drums (1989–1995)

Jawboneofanass lineup

- Allan Ramald Aguirre Dömkus – vocals, guitar, keyboards, percussion (1983–1985, 1989–1994, 1997–1998, 2001–2002)
- Paul Figuero – guitar (1992–1995), keyboards (1991)
- Omar Dömkus – bass (1983–1985, 1989–1994)
- Samuel West – drums (1989–1995)

Grandmother's Spaceship lineup

- Allan Ramald Aguirre Dömkus – vocals, guitar, keyboards
- Russell Archer – guitar, keyboards, background vocals (1997–1998)
- Steven Meigs – bass guitar (1997–1998)
- Steve Martens – drums, percussion (1997–1998)
- Kane Kelly – bass guitar (1998–1999)

Omega No. 5 lineup

- Allan Ramald Aguirre Dömkus – vocals, guitar, drums (1983–1985, 1989–1995, 1997–1998, 2001–2002)
- Brad Bevill – guitar, backing vocals (2001–2002)
- Chris Smythers – bass, backing vocals (2001–2002)
- Joe Sidoti – drums (2002)

Timeline

== Discography ==
Studio albums

- Sin Disease (1990)
- Jawboneofanass (1994)
- Out of the Attic (1994)
- Grandmother's Spaceship (1998)
- Omega No. 5 (2002)
