= Bride (band) =

American Christian metal band

- Origin: Louisville, Kentucky, U.S.
- Genres: Christian metal; Christian rock; hard rock; heavy metal
- Years active: 1983–present
- Labels: Pure Metal; Star Song; Rugged; Organic; Retroactive
- Members: Dale Thompson; Troy Thompson
- Past members: Steve Osborne; Frank Partipilo; Rick Foley; Scott Hall; Steve Curtsinger; Stephen Rolland; Andrew Wilkinson; Lawrence Bishop; Michael Loy; Jerry McBroom; G.D Watts
- Website: bridepub.com

Bride is an American Christian rock and metal band that formed in Louisville, Kentucky by brothers Dale and Troy Thompson in 1983. During the band's peak years, it was known for covering a wide range of musical styles and remains popular in places like Brazil. Their song "Same 'Ol Sinner" is on the Digital Praise PC game Guitar Praise.

== History ==
Bride formed in 1983 in Louisville, Kentucky by brothers Dale and Troy Thompson. Going by the name Matrix at first, the brothers started writing music and recording demos in 1983. They recorded four demos and started selling them at concerts and through magazines. In 1986, the band opened for the Canadian group Daniel Band in Pottstown, Pennsylvania. This performance caught the eye of an agent of Refuge Records. He decided to sign them to their new label, Pure Metal Records, which was oriented to metal music. At that time, the band consisted of vocalist Dale Thompson, bassist Troy Thompson, guitarist William Sutherland and drummer Stephen Rolland. With this lineup, Troy Thompson sometimes also played guitar while Dale Thompson played bass. They officially changed its name to Bride and went on to record Show No Mercy. In 1988, bassist Frank Partipilo joined the band and with this line up they recorded Live to Die and Silence Is Madness (1989).

With their contract with Pure Metal Records about to end, the band released End of the Age in 1990, which is a compilation album of hits from their first three albums, as well as two new songs that would go to become Bride staples – Everybody Knows My Name and Same Ol' Sinner. The album signaled the "end of an age" as the band shifted away from the heavy metal of their past towards a Guns N' Roses' influenced hard rock sound.

In 1991, Rick Foley (bass) and Jerry McBroom (drums) joined the band. With a new record deal with Star Song Records, the band released Kinetic Faith that year. The album spawned some hits in commercial radio. In 1992, it was announced that Dale would leave to join Stryper to replace Michael Sweet, but this never took place. They followed Kinetic Faith with Snakes in the Playground in 1992 and Scarecrow Messiah in 1994 before releasing another compilation album, Shotgun Wedding: 11 No. 1 Hits and Mrs., and finally parting ways with Starsong in 1995. All three albums produced many successful hits in Brazil, where the band has toured and been received with enormous crowds and fanbase.

That same year, the band signed a one-record deal with a new label called Rugged Records. They also welcomed a new bassist, Steve Curtsinger. Drop (1995) featured banjo and mandolin.

In 1997, The Jesus Experience, Bride's eighth studio album, was released on Organic Records. The album continued the band's alternative rock-style leanings while incorporating grunge and post-grunge overtones. A music video was made for the track "The Worm"; the song was released as a single in 1997. According to Dale Thompson during an interview in April 1997, the album's title was inspired by a conversation with an individual after the end of one of the band's concerts in Indiana.

In 1998, the band released Oddities. Although intended to be a return to their roots, the album was more of a blend between alternative rock and hard rock. After some differences with the label, the band asked to be released from its contract. Sometime later, Curtsinger and was replaced with Andrew Wilkinson before Lawrence Bishop took the spot, McBroom also left and was replaced with Michael Loy.

Being picked up by Absolute Records and veering into rapcore territory, the band released Fist Full of Bees in 2001. The album was quickly disparaged by fans for containing nu metal and rapcore elements.

In 2003, the band independently released This Is It. It was re-released in 2006 under Retrospective Records, digitally remastered and with bonus tracks and a new cover.

In 2006, Bride released Skin for Skin, with guitar solos from former Bride guitarist Steve Osborne. The album was praised by Scott Waters of Ultimatum, who said it was "a logical step from 'This Is It' and is an honest and successful attempt to progress without worry of what is popular."

The band reunited with former members, Jerry McBroom and Steve Osborne, to record their next album, Tsar Bomba, which was released on October 27, 2009.

In 2011, Retroactive Records remastered and re-released the band's first three albums (Show No Mercy, Live to Die, Silence Is Madness) in a series called "The Originals". In addition, 2003's This Is It was also remastered to support the re-releases.

Original guitarist Steve Osborne died of suicide on November 16, 2011.

In December 2013, after 30 years, Dale Thompson announced that the band was coming to an end.

The band released "Here is Your God" on Retroactive Records in November 2020 while announcing a new album of the same name, for release on CD on December 15, 2020, and on vinyl on March 10, 2021.

The band began working on a new album in 2022, announcing the release of "Are You Awake?" for early 2023.

In 2025, the band self released a double album titled "Vipers and Shadows".

== Band members ==
Current lineup

- Dale Thompson – vocals
- Troy Thompson – guitars
- Frank Partipilo – bass (1988–1991, 2024–present)
- Alexandre Aposan – drums

Former

- Steve Osborne – guitar (1986–1988, 2006, 2009) (died 2011)
- Scott Hall – bass (1986–1988)
- Rick Foley – bass (1991–1994)
- Steve Curtsinger – bass (1995–1998, 1999)
- Stephen Rolland – drums (1986–1990)
- Nenel Lucena – bass
- Andrew Wilkinson – bass (1998–1999)
- Michael Loy – drums (1999–2009)
- Lawrence Bishop – bass (1999–2009)
- G.D Watts – bass (2009–2013)
- Jerry McBroom – drums (1991–1999, 2009–2013)

Timeline

== Discography ==
Main studio albums

- Show No Mercy (1986, Pure Metal)
- Live to Die (1988, Pure Metal)
- Silence Is Madness (1989, Pure Metal)
- Kinetic Faith (1991, Star Song)
- Snakes in the Playground (1992, Star Song)
- Scarecrow Messiah (1994, Star Song)
- Drop (1995, Rugged Records)
- The Jesus Experience (1997, Organic Records)
- Oddities (November 23, 1998, Organic, Reviews: HM Magazine)
- Fist Full of Bees (2001, Absolute Records)
- This is It (2003, independent)
- Skin for Skin (2006, Retroactive Records)
- Tsar Bomba (2009, Retroactive Records)
- Incorruptible (2013, Retroactive Records)
- Snake Eyes (2018, independent)
- Here is Your God (2020, Retroactive Records)
- Are You Awake (2023, Retroactive Records)
- Vipers and Shadows (2025, independent)

Compilations and other releases

- End of the Age (1990, Star Song)
- Snakes in the Playground Special Collector's Edition (1992, Star Song)
- The Lost Reels (1994, independent)
- God Gave Rock and Roll to You single (1994, Star Song)
- I Predict a Clone – various artists (1994, REX 41004-2, a tribute to Steve Taylor)
- Shotgun Wedding: 11 No. 1 Hits and Mrs. (1995, Star Song)
- The Lost Reels II (1996, independent)
- The Worm single (1997, Organic)
- The Lost Reels III (1997, independent)
- Bride Live! Volume I (1999, Old School Records)
- Bride Live Volume II Acoustic (2000, Millennium Eight Records)
- Best of Bride (June 27, 2000, Organic Records)
- Live at Cornerstone 2001 (2001, Millennium Eight Records)
- The Matrix Years & Lost Reels I (2001, Millennium Eight Records)
- The Organic Years (2002, Millennium Eight Records)
- This Is It (2006, Retroactive Records with bonus tracks)
- Bluegrass Gospel (2021, independent)
- Christmas (2021, independent)
- Eyes Wide Open EP (2023, Retroactive Records)
- The Lost Reels 4 (2025, independent)

== Awards ==
Bride has received four Dove Awards from the Gospel Music Association. Three awards were for "Hard Music Song" in 1992, 1993, and 1994. The fourth award was at the 26th GMA Dove Awards in 1995 for "Hard Music Album" for Scarecrow Messiah.

== See also ==
- List of Christian metal artists
