= Bride Live! Volume I =

Live album by Bride
- Released: 1999
- Recorded: 1997–1998
- Genre: Christian metal, Christian rock
- Length: 66:30
- Label: Old School Records
- Producer: Bradley S. Hamilton

Bride chronology
Oddities (1998)	Bride Live! Volume I (1999)	Best of Bride (2000)

Professional ratings
Review scores
Source	Rating
HM Magazine	(not rated) link

Bride Live! Volume I is a live album by American Christian metal band Bride. It was released in 1999 through Old School Records and contains live recordings of songs from The Jesus Experience (1997) and Oddities (1998), the band's eighth and ninth studio albums. The album's release was limited to 2,500 copies.

== Track listing ==
1. "Intro" – 0:34
2. "I Ain't Coming Down" – 2:35
3. "If I Told You It Was the End of the World" – 4:20
4. "The Worm" – 4:47
5. "I Found God" – 4:48
6. "Under the Blood" – 4:48
7. "Day By Day" – 4:13
8. "If I Live For You" – 3:32
9. "Why Won't He Break" – 4:10
10. "End" – 4:56
11. "No Drugs" – 0:25
12. "It's Only When I'm Left Alone" – 4:08
13. "He Never Changes" – 0:07
14. "I Love You" – 3:05
15. "Amazing Grace" – 3:57
16. "The Big Black Motor" – 0:42
17. "Jesus On the Mainline" – 3:02
18. "I Have Decided" – 3:16
19. "Dale's Sermon" – 9:05
- Tracks 1–9 recorded at The Christmas Rock Night Festival in Germany, December 1998.
- Tracks 10–14 recorded during the Fall 1998 Brazil Tour.
- Tracks 15–18 recorded at The King's Palace, Columbus, Ohio on November 21, 1998.
- Track 19 recorded at Cornerstone Festival in Bushnell, Illinois, 1997.

== Personnel ==
- Album artwork - Ron Campbell
- Digital imaging - Steve Schell
- Concert photography - Steve Hutson
