= Live to Die (Bride album) =

Studio album by Bride
- Released: 1988
- Genres: Christian metal; speed metal; thrash metal
- Length: 35:20
- Label: Pure Metal
- Producer: Armand John Petri

Bride chronology
Show No Mercy (1986)	Live to Die (1988)	Silence Is Madness (1989)

Professional ratings
Review scores
Source	Rating
CCM Magazine	(not rated)

Live to Die is the second album by the American heavy metal band Bride. It is the band's second album to be released on the label Pure Metal Records in 1988. Live to Die is considered by critics to be the band's finest release in its metal era. Songs such as "Hell No" and "Heroes" have become Christian metal anthems and were popular songs in the band's concerts.

== Recording ==
Live to Die saw Bride adding elements of speed and thrash metal to its output. The compositions reflect a more mature song writing in some of their more well-known tracks such as "Hell No", "Whiskey Seed", and "Heroes". The vocalist Dale Thompson continues to display a high-pitched, pseudo-operatic vocal style. The album is characterized by the dual guitar work and harmonies by Troy Thompson and Steve Osborne, highlighted on the songs "Fire and Brimstone" and "Heroes". On this album, the drummer Stephen Rolland began playing precise double bass technique. Frank Partipilo replaced Scott Hall on bass. Live to Die also shows a more advanced production compared to that of Show No Mercy.

== Overview ==
The opening track "Metal Might" is a more power metal type double bass driven song, followed by the Christian metal anthem "Hell No", known for its chorus with a catchy hook. The lyrics of "Hell No" talk about sailors trying to stay afloat at stormy seas as a metaphor for struggling in life: "The storm is screaming with vengeance to kill/ Faith has plunged into the sea beneath/ Waves beat the ship with iron first to sink/ We won't go to hell, no we won't go." "In the Dark" takes off at an upbeat tempo to an edgy rhythm guitar only to slow to an acoustic guitar for its first verse. The song contains a short interlude reminiscent of jazz fusion. "Out for Blood" is about Judas betraying Christ: "You're just a kiss away from your destiny/ Just a word away from deceiving a friend/ Judas kiss, Judas kiss/ Out for blood, you're out for blood."

The title track begins with and aggressive guitar driven output moving to an epic feel. The meaning behind "Live to Die" is about salvation: "I won't be the one to say/ That you don't need religion/ But without a Savior/ There's no chance to be forgiven." The thrash metal influenced riff at the beginning of "Fire and Brimstone" gives the track an aggressive feel. It features some virtuosic dual lead guitar work by Troy Thompson and Steve Osborne. "Whiskey Seed" takes a stance on alcoholism: "So you want/ to drink/ Because it makes you feel big/ Pour it down, I'll break you like a little twig/ You're so young, but you want to feel so old/ The only way to be hot, gain the world and lose your soul." "Here Comes the Bride" takes a speed metal approach, and the song speeds up to a fast pace with a double bass driven riff. "Heroes" is a seven-minute epic songs about the fight between good and evil. The song starts with a narration reminiscent of horror movies accompanied by organ playing. "Heroes" progresses to the point when Troy Thompson and Steve Osborne play together for over a minute of rhythm guitar harmony. The song progresses through its first verse at a double bass driven mid-tempo pace until it reaches an anthem type peak.

== Track listing ==
1. Metal Might (3:36)
2. Hell No (3:51)
3. In the Dark (4:12)
4. Out for Blood (3:00)
5. Live to Die (2:54)
6. Fire and Brimstone (4:27)
7. Whiskey Seed (3:43)
8. Here Comes the Bride (2:29)
9. Heroes (7:11)
