= Sin Disease =

Studio album by Scaterd Few
- Released: 1990
- Recorded: 1990
- Genre: Punk rock, Christian punk
- Length: 39:19
- Label: Alarma
- Producer: Allan Aguirre, Terry Scott Taylor, Omar Domkus

Scaterd Few chronology
Sin Disease (1990)	Jawboneofanass (1994)

Professional ratings
Review scores
Source	Rating
Hard Music Magazine	not rated
Opus Zine	
Music.com	
Allmusic	4.5/5 stars
Phileas Phogg	Album #8
Cross Rhythms	8/10 stars
Cornerstone	not rated

Sin Disease was Scaterd Few's first full-length studio album. CCM magazine described the release as "pure punk for dread people," stating that it was a cross between Jane's Addiction and Charlie Mingus.

== Track listing ==
1. "Kill the Sarx"
2. "While Reprobate"
3. "Beggar"
4. "Lights Out"
5. "Later (L.A. 1989)"
6. "Groovy"
7. "Glass God"
8. "As the Story Grows"
9. "U"
10. "A Freedom Cry"
11. "Scapegoat"
12. "Wonder Why"
13. "DITC"
14. "Self"
15. "Look Into My Side"
16. "Kill the Sarx II"

== Credits ==
- Omar Domkus: bass guitar, background vocals
- Rämald Domkus: vocals, electric / acoustic guitars, keyboard, percussion
- Jamie Mitchell: electric guitars, background vocals
- Samuel West: percussion, background vocals
- Additional string arrangements on "Look Into My Side" by Terry Taylor
- Riki Michele - Female Vocals on "A Freedom Cry" (of Adam Again, courtesy of Broken Records)
- "Shouters" in the mountains of Zion:
  - Tony Shore
  - Riki
  - Brian Miller
  - Terry
  - Ramald
  - Omar
- Children on "Lights Out"
  - Angela Blakely
  - David
  - Jenae Ramirez
  - Xaundelle Aguirre
- Additional BGV's Jav
- Additional keys on "Look Into My Side": Drew Domkus
- Additional guitars: Tools, Ed Lover
- Greg Lawless courtesy of Broken Records
- Greg Flesch - lounge piano and horns on "Kill the Sarx II", additional guitars
- Voices - Terry, Ramald, Sam and Omar

Terry Taylor wrote a short history and introduction to the band in the album's liner notes. Liner Notes

Allan also sings "Later" and "Self" on Dighayzoose Ascension 7: Rocketship to Heaven.
