= Singing News Fan Awards for Marvin Norcross Award =

The Marvin Norcross Award is awarded yearly in the Singing News Fan Awards ceremony to honor an individual selected by the staff of the Singing News magazine who has made distinct contributions to Southern gospel music over his or her career.

== Honorees ==
- 1981: Carroll Stout
- 1982: Wendy Bagwell, Wendy Bagwell and the Sunliters
- 1983: Les Beasley, Florida Boys
- 1984: Don Butler
- 1985: W.B. Nowlin
- 1986: Eldridge Fox, Kingsmen Quartet
- 1987: Glen Payne and George Younce
- 1988: Jack Pittman, Palmetto State Quartet
- 1989: Roy Carter, Chuck Wagon Gang
- 1990: Squire Parsons
- 1991: Paul Heil
- 1992: Bob Brumley
- 1993: Jake Hess
- 1994: James Blackwood, Blackwood Brothers
- 1995: Buddy Liles, Florida Boys
- 1996: Tim Riley, Gold City
- 1998: Connie Hopper, The Hoppers
- 1999: Archie Watkins, The Inspirations
- 2000: Ed O'Neal, Dixie Melody Boys
- 2001: Ruben Bean, The McKameys
- 2002: Martin Cook, The Inspirations
- 2003: Glen Allred, Florida Boys
- 2004: Eddie & Janice Crook
- 2005: Jackie & Elaine Wilburn

This award was not presented in the 1997, 2006, or 2007 Singing News Fan Awards.

As of 2008, the award was renamed the Norcross-Templeton Award.

- 2008: Maurice Templeton, Singing News & Templeton Tours
- 2009: Jerry Kirksey
- 2010: Primitive Quartet
- 2011: Peg McKamey Bean, The McKameys
- 2012: Mike Holcomb, The Inspirations
