= 4th GMA Dove Awards =

1972 US music awards ceremony

- Date: 1972
- Location: Nashville, Tennessee

The fourth Gospel Music Association (GMA) Music Awards were held in 1972 for accomplishments of musicians for the year 1972.

The event was held at the War Memorial Auditorium with about 800 attendees.

== Background ==
An indication that gospel music was fast approaching professionalism was a bona fide scandal over GMA's 1971 Dove Awards. The incident involved one of gospel music's premier groups, The Blackwood Brothers, who had captured nine out of fourteen awards. They were accused of having conducted an extensive campaign to enlist new members to the GMA and to encourage members to vote for particular award nominees in the Dove Award balloting. Though no specific bylaw of the organization had been broken, the tactic created an industrywide concern over "voting irregularities and ethical ballot influence and solicitation."

The GMA Board voted to nullify the entire process, thereby invalidating all the awards that had been presented at the October 8, 1971, banquet held in Nashville. Also, a committee was formed to adjust the voting process with "safeguards to prevent any future irregularities in Dove Awards balloting." James Blackwood issued a statement in support of the organization's decision and strongly urged all other participants in the Dove Awards to subscribe and adhere to the code of ethics to be set forth by the Gospel Music Association.

== Compilation album ==
Canaan Records of Waco, Texas, issued a long play album of nominated recordings titled The Gospel Music Association's Dove Awards Nominations for the Gospel Song of 1972 (CAS-9732-LP Stereo). Tracks on the recording are given in this table:

Side A
No.	Title	Performer	Length
1.	"After Calvary"	Blue Ridge Quartet
2.	"Because He Lives"	The Speer Family
3.	"Build My Mansion (Next Door to Jesus)"	The Rambos
4.	"I Can Feel the Touch of His Hand"	The Blackwood Brothers
5.	"Redemption Draweth Nigh"	The Oak Ridge Boys

Side B
No.	Title	Performer	Length
1.	"The King is Coming"	Bill Gaither Trio
2.	"The Lighthouse"	The Florida Boys
3.	"There's Something About that Name"	The Downings
4.	"Through It All"	Andraé Crouch and the Disciples
5.	"Turn Your Radio On"	The Lewis Family

== Award recipients ==
Song of the Year

- "The Lighthouse"; Ron Hinson; Journey Music (BMI)

Songwriter of the Year

- Bill Gaither

Male Vocalist of the Year

- James Blackwood

Female Vocalist of the Year

- Sue Chenault

Male Group of the Year

- Oak Ridge Boys

Mixed Group of the Year

- Speer Family

Most Promising New Gospel Talent

- London Parris and the Apostles

Album of the Year

- Light; Oak Ridge Boys; Bob MacKenzie, Heart Warming

Instrumentalist

- Tony Brown

Backliner Notes

- Johnny Cash; Light; Oak Ridge Boys

Cover Photo or Cover Art

- Bill Grine; Street Gospel; Oak Ridge Boys

Graphic Layout and Design

- Ace Lehman; L-O-V-E Love; Blackwood Brothers

Television Program

- Gospel Jubilee, Florida Boys

D.J. of the Year

- J. G. Whitfield
