= Joe Lee Armstrong =

American singer

Joe Lee Armstrong (born July 13, 1955) is an American Christian Southern gospel bass singer. Initially, he was a member of his family's singing group, and later a member of The Mystery Men Quartet and then Mark209. While with the Mystery Men Quartet the groups radio single, Ready To Leave, reached the top 40 in the Singing News southern gospel music charts. While with Mark209, the group's first radio single, My Home In Heaven, reached the top 45 on the Singing News southern gospel music charts. Armstrong had features on both releases. Armstrong currently sings bass for Mark209 as bass

== Early life ==
Joe Lee Armstrong was born in Birmingham, Alabama. He began singing in 1972. Armstrong learned to love gospel music while traveling with his dad and mother. His father was a Baptist evangelist preaching tent revivals across the country.

== Career ==
After singing with various local groups in the Alabama area, Armstrong was hired by owner Ed Crawford, formerly of The Kingsmen Quartet, in 1998 to join the Mystery Men Quartet as bass singer. Armstrong remained with the Mystery Men quartet until the group dissolved its name and announced a name change to Mark209.

Armstrong left Mark209 in July 2012 to accept the position of bass singer with the southern gospel hall of fame group the Florida Boys quartet.

== Personal life ==
Armstrong has one brother, Charles Armstrong. He met Dena Long and they married. He has one stepdaughter, Alisha from his marriage. The Armstrong's reside in Clanton, Alabama.

== Discography ==
- Sing It Again -The Mystery Men Quartet (2008)- bass vocals
- Biblically Correct -The Mystery Men Quartet (2010)- bass vocals
- Grassroots- Mark209 (2011)- bass vocals
- From The Heart Of Nashville- Mark209 (2012)- bass vocals
- Music That Got Us Here -The Florida Boys (2012)- bass vocals
- Time -The Florida Boys (2013) -bass vocals
- Overtime -The Florida Boys (2014) -bass vocals
- Time Out- The Florida Boys Quartet (2016) - bass vocals
- Everything's Alright- The Florida Boys Quartet (2016) -bass vocals
