= Charles Waller =

Charles or Charlie Waller may refer to:

- Charles Townshend Waller (c. 1780–1830), reverend and baronet
- Charles Waller (cricketer) (1832–1886), English cricketer
- Charles Henry Waller (1840–1910), Church of England minister, evangelical theologian and teacher
- Charles Waller (provost) (1891–1951), Anglican provost of Chelmsford
- Charlie Waller (American football) (1921–2009), American football coach
- Charlie Waller (American musician) (1935–2004), American bluegrass musician
- Charles Allen Waller (born 1948), Southern Gospel singer, promoter and producer
- Charlie Waller (British musician) (born 1980), British rock musician
- Charlie Waller (footballer) (born 2005), English footballer
