= John McClung =

John McClung may refer to:

- John McClung (judge), Canadian historian, lawyer and judge
- John Alexander McClung (1891–1942), American singer-songwriter
- John McClung (1906–1991), guitar player with John & Emery McClung, old-time music performers
