= J. G. Whitfield =

American gospel musician (1915–2006)

- Born: Jesse Gillis Whitfield
- Genres: Christian

Jesse Gillis Whitfield (1915–2006), also known as J.G. or Whit, was a gospel musician, music promoter, and a member of the Southern Gospel Music Association Hall of Fame.

== Biography ==
After serving in the Air Force, Whitfield worked in the grocery business in Florida. In 1947, as a bass singer, he founded and managed the Southern gospel group, Gospel Melody Quartet, composed of his friends. Several personnel changes followed including the additions Glen Allred in 1952 and Les Beasley in 1953. Whitfield was eventually persuaded to change the group's name to the Florida Boys in 1954. He continued to manage and sing bass until he left the group in 1958 in order to avoid traveling away from his family.

Whitfield formed the Dixie Echoes, another Florida-based group. Whitfield worked as a concert promoter across the South, helping to launch The Gospel Singing Jubilee television program. In 1969, he began publishing the Singing News to promote his concerts.

Mr. Whitfield also sang bass in a little-known northwest Florida Southern Gospel Group called "The Workmen Quartet." This was the last group he sang with. Note: He did not start this quartet.

He was inducted into the Gospel Music Hall of Fame in 1990. The Southern Gospel Music Association inducted Whitfield into the Hall of Fame in 1997.
