= Gospel Music Hall of Fame =

Hall of fame for gospel music

Coordinates: 35.7962°N 83.5338°W

The Gospel Music Hall of Fame, created in 1972 by the Gospel Music Association, is a hall of fame dedicated exclusively to recognizing meaningful contributions by individuals and groups in all forms of gospel music.

== Inductees ==
This is an incomplete list of those inducted into the GMA's Gospel Music Hall of Fame, listed alphabetically with the year of induction. Many of these were honored posthumously for their contribution in gospel music.

=== Individuals ===
Year	Inductee	Ref.
1971	G. T. "Dad" Speer	
1971	Jim "Pappy" Waites	
1972	Albert E. Brumley, Sr.	
1972	James D. Vaughan	
1972	Lena "Mom" Brock Speer	
1973	Adger M. Pace	
1973	Denver Crumpler	
1973	E.M. Bartlett, Sr.	
1973	Frank Stamps	
1973	Homer Rodeheaver	
1973	J. R. Baxter	
1973	John Daniel	
1973	Lee Roy Abernathy	
1973	R. E. Winsett	
1973	V. O. "Virgil Oliver" Stamps	
1973	W. B. Walbert	
1974	Glenn Kieffer Vaughan	
1974	James Blackwood, Sr.	
1975	Brock Speer	
1975	Fanny Crosby	
1976	Mosie Lister	
1976	George Bennard	
1977	Eva Mae LeFevre	
1977	James S. "Big Chief" Wetherington	
1978	George Beverly Shea	
1978	Mahalia Jackson	
1980	Connor Hall	
1980	Ira D. Sankey	
1981	Clarice Baxter	
1981	Ira F. Stanphill	
1981	John T. Benson, Jr.	
1982	B. B. McKinney	
1982	Charles H. Gabriel	
1982	Haldor Lillenas	
1982	John Newton	
1982	John T. Benson, Sr.	
1982	Dr. Lowell Mason	
1982	Thomas A. Dorsey	
1983	Bill Gaither	
1983	Marvin Norcross	
1984	Clara Ward	
1984	Cleavant Derricks	
1984	D. P. "Dad" Carter	
1984	Ethel Waters	
1984	Hovie Lister	
1984	J.D. "John Daniel" Sumner	
1984	James Cleveland	
1984	John Wallace Fowler	
1984	Lloyd Orrell	
1984	P.J. "Pat" Zondervan	
1984	Paul Heinecke	
1984	W. B. Nowlin	
1985	Ralph Carmichael	
1985	Tim Spencer	
1986	John W. Peterson	
1986	Urias LeFevre	
1987	W.J. "Jake" Hess	
1988	Cliff Barrows	
1989	Les Beasley	
1989	P. P. Bliss	
1990	J. G. Whitfield	
1991	Bentley D. Ackley	
1991	Charles M. Alexander	
1991	Charles Weigle	
1991	Robert "Bob" Benson, Sr.	
1991	Sallie Martin	
1991	William Morgan Ramsey	
1992	Dottie Rambo	
1992	James B. Coats	
1992	John Alexander "J.A." McClung	
1992	Oren A. Parris	
1992	Samuel W. Beazley	
1992	W. Oliver Cooper	
1993	Asa Brooks Everett	
1993	Charles A. Tindley	
1993	Charlie D. Tillman	
1993	Charles "Rusty" Goodman	
1993	James Edward Marsh	
1993	James Rowe	
1993	Jarrell McCracken	
1993	W.F. "Jim" Myers	
1994	Jimmie Davis	
1994	Stuart Hamblen	
1994	Stuart K. Hine	
1994	Tennessee Ernie Ford	
1995	Ben Lacy Speer	
1995	Charles Wesley	
1995	Donald W. Butler, Sr.	
1995	Glen Payne	
1996	Alphus LeFevre	
1996	Herman Harper	
1997	Billy Ray Hearn	
1997	Gloria Gaither	
1998	Andraé Crouch	
1998	Jacob Bazzel Mull	
1999	Billy Graham	
1999	George Younce	
2000	Bob MacKenzie	
2000	Edwin Hawkins	
2000	Shirley Caesar (Note: Shirley Caesar was inducted twice, once in 2000 and again in 2017)	
2001	Albertina Walker	
2001	Doris Akers	
2001	Elvis Presley	
2001	Keith Green	
2001	Kurt Kaiser	
2001	Larry Norman	
2003	Amy Grant (Note: Amy Grant was inducted twice, once in 2003 and again in 2017)	
2003	Pat Boone	
2004	Al Green	
2004	Frances Preston	
2004	Sandi Patty	
2004	Vestal Goodman	
2005	Don Light	
2005	Evie Tornquist	
2005	Lou Wills Hildreth	
2005	Mylon LeFevre	
2005	Ron Huff	
2005	Walter Hawkins	
2006	Doug Oldham	
2006	John T. Benson III	
2006	Richard Smallwood	
2007	Joe Moscheo	
2007	Larnelle Harris	
2007	Phil Keaggy	
2008	Dolly Parton	
2008	Dr. Bobby Jones (Note: Dr. Bobby Jones was inducted twice, once in 2008 and again in 2014)	
2008	Lari Goss	
2008	Michael W. Smith	
2010	Bill "Hoss" Allen	
2010	Johnny Cash	
2012	Aretha Franklin	
2012	Dallas Holm	
2012	Rex Humbard	
2012	Ricky Skaggs	
2014	Brown Bannister	
2014	Don Moen (Note: Dan Moen was inducted twice, once in 2014 and again in 2019)	
2014	Dr. Bobby Jones	
2014	Michael Guido	
2014	Rich Mullins	
2015	Bishop Paul S. Morton	
2015	Mark Lowry	
2015	Roland Lundy	
2015	Twila Paris	
2016	Hezekiah Walker	
2016	Howard Rachinski	
2016	Michael W. Smith	
2016	Russ Taff	
2017	Amy Grant	
2017	Natalie Grant	
2017	Shirley Caesar	
2017	Steve Green	
2017	Yolanda Adams	
2018	Bishop Marvin Sapp	
2018	Carman	
2018	Greg Nelson	
2018	Karen Peck	
2019	Don Moen	
2019	Dottie Leonard Miller	
2019	Janet Paschal	
2019	Tramaine Hawkins	
2021	Bill Hearn	

=== Groups ===
Year	Inductee	Ref.
1998	Disciples	
1998	Happy Goodman Family	
1998	Speer Family	
1998	Stamps Quartet	
1998	The Blackwood Brothers	
1998	The Chuck Wagon Gang	
1998	The Imperials	
1998	The Jordanaires	
1998	The LeFevres	
1998	The Statesmen Quartet	
1999	Cathedral Quartet	
1999	Gaither Trio	
1999	Florida Boys	
1999	Mighty Clouds of Joy	
1999	Second Chapter of Acts	
1999	The Fairfield Four	
2000	Fisk Jubilee Singers	
2000	Kingsmen	
2000	Petra	
2000	Roger Breland & Truth	
2000	The Oak Ridge Boys	
2001	Rambos	
2001	Sunliters & Wendy Bagwell	
2003	The Blind Boys of Alabama	
2005	The Lewis Family	
2006	The Hinsons	
2007	The Statler Brothers	
2007	The Winans	
2008	The Dixie Hummingbirds	
2010	DeGarmo & Key	
2010	Golden Gate Quartet	
2012	Hoppers	
2012	Love Song	
2014	Take 6	
2014	Gaither Vocal Band	
2015	BeBe and CeCe Winans	
2016	The Nelons	
2017	Dorothy Love Coates and the Gospel Harmonettes	
2017	Gold City Quartet	
2017	The Harmonizing Four	
2017	The Roberta Martin Singers	
2018	The Staple Singers	
2019	Rascal Flatts	
2021	Commissioned	
2021	The Isaacs	
2021	4Him	

=== Charities and organizations ===
Year	Inductee	Ref.
2014	Show Hope	
2014	World Vision	
2015	Al Andrews / Porter’s Call	
2015	Candy Christmas / The Bridge, Inc.	
2015	Louie and Shelley Giglio / Passion	
2016	Catherine Brewton / Hope for Harvest	
2016	Gospel Music Trust Fund	
2016	Jars of Clay, Blood:Water Mission	
2017	Blanton and Harrell	
2017	Compassion International	
2018	Chonda Pierce / Branches Counseling Center	
2018	Lipscomb University	
2018	Ryan Lampa / People Loving Nashville	
2019	Don Finto / Caleb Company	
2019	LaDonna Boyd / R.H. Boyd Family Endowment Fund	
2019	The Premier Foundation	
2021	Chris Tomlin / Angel Armies	
2021	Steve Moore / The Shalom Foundation	
2021	Wes Campbell & Dave Wagner / Thriving Children’s Foundation (TCA)	
2021	Willie Moore Jr. / Bethany Christian Services	

== See also ==
- List of music museums
- Southern Gospel Museum and Hall of Fame

== Sources ==
- ″International Gospel Music Hall of Fame″, in W. K. McNeil, Encyclopedia of American Gospel Music, Taylor & Francis, 2013, pages 193-196.
- Dana Lackey, ″Gospel Music Hall of Fame and Museum″, in African American Family, June 2004.
- Marylynn G. Ewitt, ″Gospel Music Hall of Fame and Museum with Sing Praises″, in The Oakland Press, December 13, 1998.
