= Jimmy Reno =

American singer

James W. Reno (born January 8, 1969) is an American Christian country music singer and jazz trombonist from North Alabama. He was initially a member of his family's singing group, and later of The Mystery Men Quartet and then Mark209. He subsequently sang baritone with the Florida Boys before returning to Mark209 in 2016.

== Early life ==
Reno was born in Birmingham, Alabama, and raised in nearby Pinson. He was born third out of four children: his brother Randy has died; his sisters are Cindy and Kristie. He grew up singing with his parents and later many other groups, typically singing either the baritone or the lead parts.

== Career ==
In 1988, along with two classmates from high school, Reno helped create the gospel music trio known as Trinity. The group traveled throughout Alabama for the next nine years. After the dissolution of Trinity, Reno went on to sing with the southern gospel mixed trio Mercy Rain and then the all-male trio To The End.

On August 10, 2011, the southern gospel quartet The Mystery Men announced Reno had been hired as their new baritone singer. Reno remained with the group after September 2011, when it changed its name to Mark209, leaving in August 2012. During his original tenure with Mark209, Reno was nominated for Favorite Baritone of The Year in the SGN Scoops Diamond Awards.

In August 2014, Reno once again joined Mark209 as the baritone vocalist. He remained with the quartet until February 24, 2015, citing health issues with his daughter as his reason for leaving in a press release.

With Mark209, Reno recorded "My Home In Heaven", which reached the top 45 on the Singing News national southern gospel music charts and remained on the national charts for 10 consecutive months. In March 2012, he sang background vocals with Mark209 in concert for country music artist Ronnie Milsap.

In September 2015, it was announced Reno had been hired as the baritone for the quartet, the Florida Boys. The Florida Boys were inducted into the Gospel Music Hall of Fame in 1999.

In 2016, upon the retirement of the Florida Boys from gospel music, Reno returned to Mark209.

In August 2018, Reno and his group, Mark209, performed a private concert for President George H.W. Bush, President George W. Bush and their families at the Bush compound on Walkers Point.

In July 2019, Mark209 released a video for "My Kind of People" that garnered 200,000 views in the first two months.

Reno launched his solo career in 2022 with his debut album, Steel Called. Reno was nominated in 2022 with the Josie Music Awards for Male Vocalist of the Year and again in 2023 for Song of the Year and Album of the Year.

== Discography ==
Albums:

- In His Presence – Trinity (1995) – baritone vocals, lead vocals
- Grassroots – Mark209 (2011) – baritone vocals, lead vocals
- From The Heart Of Nashville – Mark209 (2012) – baritone vocals, lead vocals
- The Christmas Concert vol 1 – Mark209 (2014) – baritone vocals, lead vocals
- Time Out – The Florida Boys Quartet (2016) – lead vocals, baritone vocals
- Everything's Alright – The Florida Boys Quartet (2016) –lead vocals, baritone vocals
- Grasroots 3 – Mark209 (2017) – lead vocals, baritone vocals
- Thumbprint – Mark209 (2018) – lead vocals, baritone vocals
- Steel Called – Jimmy Reno (2022) – lead vocals, harmony vocals
- Dreamer – Jimmy Reno (2025) – Trombone
- Brassin' Through The Holidays – Jimmy Reno (2025) – Trombone

Singles:

- I Need You Now – Jimmy Reno (2023) – lead vocals, harmony vocals (single)
- Gospel Outlaw – Jimmy Reno (2024) – lead vocals (single)
- His Hands – Jimmy Reno (2024) – lead vocals, harmony vocals (single)
- Rock N Roll Cowboy – Jimmy Reno (2025) – lead vocals (single)
- Dad's Table – Jimmy Reno (2025) – Trombone (single)
- When I Found You – Jimmy Reno (2025) – Trombone (single)
- America The Beautiful – Jimmy Reno (2025) – Trombone (single)
- Morning Light – Jimmy Reno (2025) – Trombone (single)
- Praise Him – Jimmy Reno (2025) – Trombone (single)
- Prince of Peace – Jimmy Reno (2026) – Trombone (single)
