= Gene McDonald =

American singer

- Genres: Christian: Southern Gospel
- Instrument: vocals
- Years active: 1989 – present

Gene McDonald (born 1963) is an American bass singer and was the bass vocalist for the Florida Boys southern gospel quartet from 1998 to 2007.

== Biography ==
=== Early years ===
McDonald's roots in gospel music began when he traveled throughout the Midwest as a child singing with his family. At that time, Gene sang the high tenor part. He sang with his mom, dad and sister from 1968 to 1980, recording three albums together. His sister Janeene went to college and the family group stopped touring.

In 1980, McDonald joined Jack Campbell and the Ambassadors where he also sang tenor. He was with the group from 1980 to 1982 and recorded one album with them.

In 1982, Gene's voice started changing and he became a bass singer. He went to college in 1983 at Arkansas State University and was taught by Al Skoog, one of the leading choral directors in the country. He was also taught voice by Mr. David Niederbrach and Ms. Julia Lansford and did opera under their teaching.

After ASU, he attended the Ben Speer School of Music, where Ben took special interest in Gene, and later invited him to a Gaither Homecoming video taping in 1994, and he then became a regular member of the Homecoming "bass" section.

McDonald joined The Plainsmen Quartet in 1989 and sang with them until 1992. They recorded one album. He joined the Florida Boys Quartet in 1998 and sang bass with the quartet until 2007. The quartet recorded over ten projects with Gene as the bass singer.

McDonald is still recording and singing with the Gaither Homecoming group and has done so since 1994. He has been on all with the exception of a few videos.

=== Recording career ===
In 2006, Gene released his first solo CD entitled In Times Like These. In 2010, he released his second solo CD I Have Returned.

=== Personal life ===
He is married to Teri McDonald, and has a son, Nathan Taft McDonald. Gene has also returned to the Gaither Homecoming tour as one of their guest soloist.

== Discography ==
- 2008: In Times Like These
- 2010: I Have Returned
- 2011: If We Love Them
- 2013: From Love to Love
- 2017: Reflections
