= Charles Allen Waller =

American singer

Charles Allen "Charlie" Waller (born November 5, 1948) is a Southern Gospel singer, promoter and producer. He also formed the Southern Gospel Music Association of Georgia in 1980 which eventually became the Southern Gospel Music Guild. Waller is also the former director of the SGMA Hall of Fame. Waller managed and sung lead for the Florida Boys quartet.

In 2007, the mantel of the Florida Boys was passed to Charlie by Les Beasley to continue on the legacy of the quartet. In 2009, Waller was inducted into the SGMA Hall of Fame.
