= Squire Parsons =

American singer-songwriter (1948–2025)

- Born: Squire Enos Parsons Jr. April 4, 1948; Newton, West Virginia, U.S.
- Origin: Newton, West Virginia, U.S.
- Died: May 5, 2025 (aged 77) Leicester, North Carolina, U.S.
- Genres: Southern gospel
- Occupations: Singer-songwriter; pianist
- Instruments: Vocals; piano
- Years active: 1974–2019
- Formerly of: The Kingsmen Quartet
- Website: SquireParsons.com

Squire Enos Parsons Jr. (April 4, 1948 – May 5, 2025) was an American Southern gospel singer and songwriter. He was born in Newton, West Virginia, to Squire and Maysel Parsons, and was introduced to music by his father, who was a choir director and deacon at Newton Baptist Church. Squire's father taught him to sing using shaped notes.

== Life and career ==
In 1970, Parsons earned a Bachelor of Science in music from West Virginia University Institute of Technology in Montgomery, where he was trained on the piano and bassoon.

Following graduation, he accepted a teaching position at Hannan High School in Mason County, West Virginia, and served as music director of various churches. During this period, he wrote "Sweet Beulah Land", his signature song.

He joined the Kingsmen Quartet as a baritone in 1975 and toured with them for four years before embarking on a solo career.

In 1975, Parsons was ordained as a minister at Trinity Baptist Church in Asheville, North Carolina. Among his most popular compositions are "The Master of the Sea", "Walk On", "He Came to Me", "I Call it Home", "I Sing Because", "I'm Not Giving Up", and "Sweet Beulah Land".

He appeared in the Little Rock Crusade with Billy Graham and performed with the Gaither Homecoming Choir. He performed as the lead singer of The Squire Parsons Trio, and lived in Leicester, North Carolina, with his wife Linda.

His songs have been recorded by Brian Free, Gaither Vocal Band, Gold City, Ivan Parker, Kingdom Heirs, the Blackwood Brothers, The Cathedrals, The Florida Boys, The Greenes, The Hoppers, The Kingsmen, The McKameys, Statesmen, Marty Raybon, Casting Crowns, The Sugar Creek Quartet, among others.

In April 2019, Parsons announced his retirement from touring, and all public appearances, due to declining health after "life-saving surgery."

On May 5, 2025, Parsons died at the age of 77.

== Awards ==
Parsons was nominated for a Dove Award in 1999 for contributing to a tribute album to Dottie Rambo.

He won the Singing News Fan Award for Favorite Male Singer in 1988. He won a Singing News Fan Award for Favorite Songwriter in 1986, 1992, 1993, 1994, and 1995. He won the Singing News Fan Award for Favorite Baritone in 1986 and 1987.

"Sweet Beulah Land" won the Singing News Fan Awards for Song of the Year in 1981.

In 1999, Parsons was awarded an honorary doctorate from his alma mater, West Virginia Institute of Technology. He made public appearances at churches across the country, both large and small.

== Selected discography ==
- Sweet Beulah Land (Dawn, 1979)
- He Came to Me (1980)
- Family Reunion (1981)
- Gloryland (1981)
- The Broken Rose (1982)
- He Redeemed Me (1983)
- His Very Best (1984)
- It Is The King Of Kings (1984)
- Wind, Rain and Fire (1985)
- That's When It Be Heaven (1986)
- Going Home (1987)
- Morning Light (1988)
- More Than I Ever Asked For (1990)
- Heavenly Country (1990)
- Christmas at Calvary: Christmas With Squire Parsons (1991)
- One Voice in the Wilderness (1992)
- High Country (1993)
- The Horizon Collection: Volume I (1993)
- 20 Favorites (1995)
- Dancing Shoes (1995)
- Come Let Us Worship
- He Found Me (1999)
- Silver Anniversary Collection (1999)
- Southern Gospel Soloists (1999)
- We Shall Get Home (2000)
- I'll Have A New Song
