= Billy Todd =

American singer

Billy Todd (September 26, 1929 – November 30, 2008) was the bass singer for the Florida Boys Quartet in the Southern Gospel music industry from the 1950s to 1972. By the end of his tenure with the Florida Boys, he was one of the most popular performers in Southern Gospel music, winning the Singing News Fan Awards for Favorite Bass Singer the first two years it was awarded (1971–72).

== Biography ==
=== Early years and personal life ===
Carl Milton "Billy" Todd was born on September 26, 1929, in Sylacauga, Alabama to the late Cecil and Bessie Todd. He has one brother, Edward, and one sister, Gladys. Billy was saved in 1946 at the First Freewill Baptist Church in Sylacauga. Then in Pensacola, Florida, he became a member of Berean Baptist Church, where he met the church pianist, Jane McWaters. On June 1, 1957, Billy and Jane celebrated their marriage. They have two children, David and Robin. Their son David and his wife Sandy live in Phoenix, Arizona. David and Sandy have three kids: Ben, Brandon, and Savannah. Robin resides now in Pensacola.

=== Career ===
Billy started singing with his family at the age of eight. In 1942, he sang with a group from his church called the Freewill Four. He remembers that they opened a concert for the John Daniel Quartet and he made five dollars! In 1946, he started singing with a group in his hometown called the Sylacauga Melody Boys. Then he sang in a barbershop quartet along with Jim Nabors. The Florida Boys hired Billy in January 1959. He left the Florida Boys in 1972 to become the principal at Berean Christian School in Pensacola (a school started by Jane Todd's father, Dr. B.H. McWaters).

When the Dixie Echoes were looking for a bass singer in 1996, Randy Shelnut called Billy to see if he would fill in. Billy Todd joined the Dixie Echoes on May 11, 1996. For many years, he was honored with a Billy Todd Day concert in his hometown of Sylacauga. In 1994 at the Grand Ole Gospel Reunion, he also received the Living Legend Award. In 1999, he was inducted along with the Florida Boys Quartet into the Gospel Music Hall Of Fame. Billy was inducted into the Southern Gospel Music Hall of Fame in 2009 at Dollywood park Pigeon Forge, Tennessee.

=== Death ===
He died on November 30, 2008, from Alzheimer's disease, aged 79.
