= Gospel Music Association =

American nonprofit organization

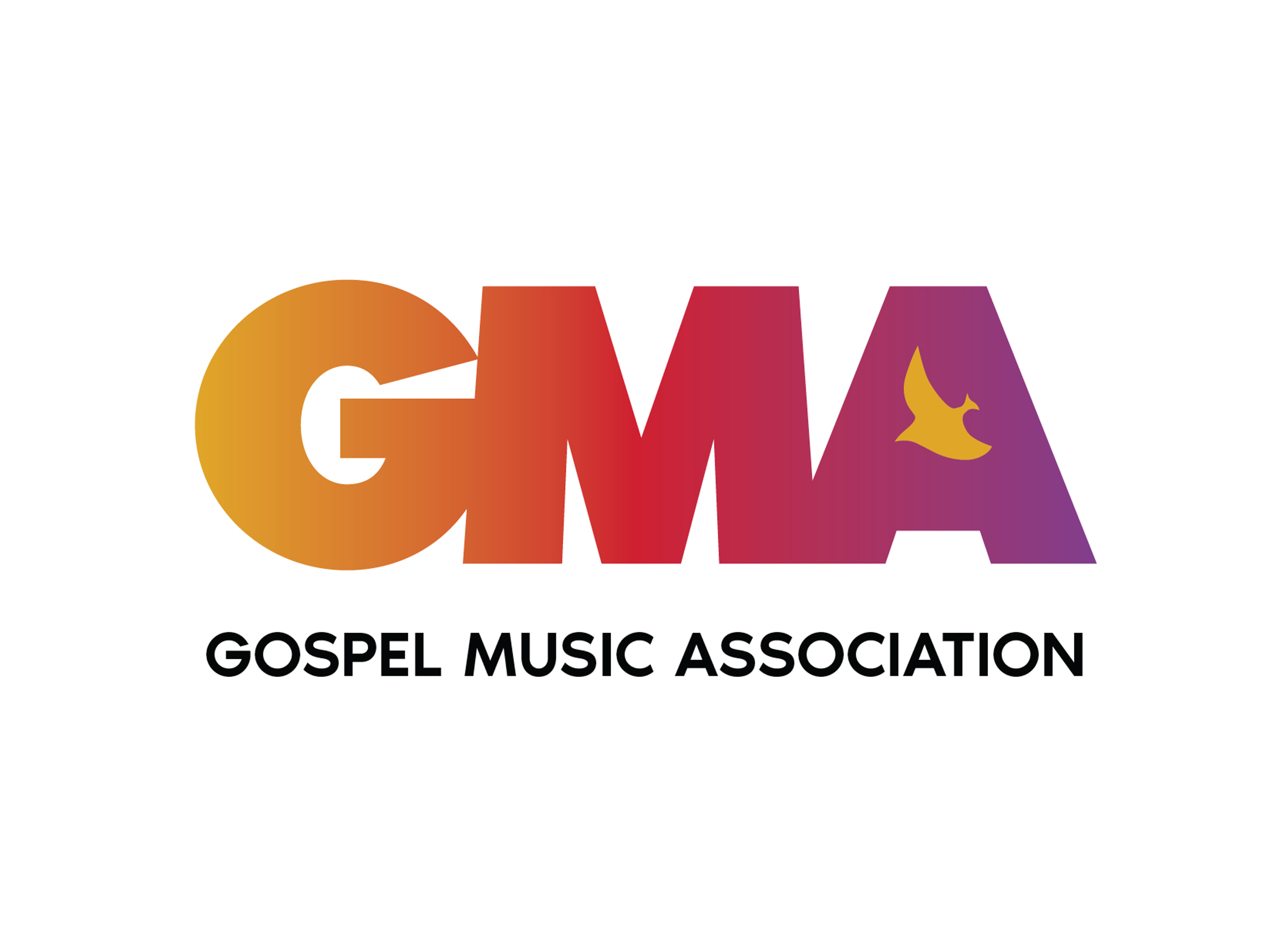
- GMA Logo
- Abbreviation: GMA
- Formation: 1964
- Affiliations: GMA Foundation
- Website: www.gospelmusic.org

The Gospel Music Association (GMA) is a nonprofit organization founded in 1964 for the purpose of supporting and promoting the development of all forms of gospel music. As of 2011, there are about 4,000 members worldwide. The GMA's membership comprises a network of artists, industry leaders, retail stores, radio stations, concert promoters and local churches involved with the wider Christian music industry.

== History ==
The GMA was founded in 1964 to promote gospel music. It was created as an extension of the National Quartet Convention, a convention devoted to Southern gospel that had been operating since 1956. Its founding board included Don Butler, Cecil and James Blackwood, Vestal Goodman, Charlie Lamb, Don Light, and J.D. Sumner, and its first president was Tennessee Ernie Ford. In its early years, it faced competition from the United States Gospel Music Association, a for-profit entity also focused on gospel music. It began organizing the Dove Awards in 1969, which eventually expanded into an awards ceremony covering the whole of Christian music. The Dove Awards had their 50th ceremony in 2019. By 1976, the GMA was well-established, with its award show bringing recognition to Christian music.

In the 1970s and 1980s, tension and conflict emerged between Southern gospel and the newer developments of Jesus music and Contemporary Christian music. Southern gospel conservatives had been resistant to racial integration, and even as they were slowly becoming more receptive to integration, the new developments in Christian music resulted in Southern gospel becoming increasingly marginalized by music consumers and losing influence in the GMA. Many Southern conservatives, including members of the GMA, also disapproved of rock music and felt that the newer styles of gospel music being promoted by the GMA indicated that the organization was essentially moving into an alliance with the "enemy". The Southern gospel industry became disenchanted with the direction that the GMA was heading and a new organization, the Southern Gospel Music Association, was formed by Charles Waller. However, in 1985, this organization was absorbed by the GMA. A new, independent Southern Gospel Music Association was formed in 1995.

== Events ==
In April of every year for several years, the GMA held GMA Week (or GMA Music Week) around Nashville, Tennessee. The week-long event includes seminars, concerts and "meet and greet" events for artists, industry workers and members of the media. "GMA Music Week" ends with the annual GMA Dove Awards ceremony, which honors contemporary Christian and gospel music. The GMA began holding the Dove Awards in the Grand Ole Opry in the 1990s and arranged for the ceremony to be broadcast on the Family Channel, raising its public profile.

Annually held in Estes Park, Colorado from 1974 to 2008, "Music in the Rockies" (formally Seminar in the Rockies) was a showcase event for aspiring (often unsigned) songwriters and artists in the Christian music industry. This event was replaced by a new event, "Immerse", in Nashville in 2009. The GMA also founded the Gospel Music Academy, which trains musicians, hosts artists-in-residence (which have included Cindy Morgan and Michael W. Smith), and organizes seminars on issues related to the music industry.

== Gospel Music Hall of Fame ==
The GMA Gospel Music Hall of Fame, which was created in 1971, is dedicated exclusively to recognizing meaningful contributions of individuals in all forms of gospel music. Inductees include Elvis Presley, Mahalia Jackson, Keith Green, Larry Norman, The Blackwood Brothers, The Imperials, J. D. Sumner and The Stamps, The Jordanaires and others. The Gospel Music Hall of Fame is overseen by the GMA Foundation, a "sister organization" established by the GMA to focus on gospel music history and education.

== Positions and controversies ==
In 1971, in the 4th GMA Dove Awards, The Blackwood Brothers, some of whose membership was also part of the GMA leadership, won almost every award for which they were eligible, a total of nine out of fourteen awards. The group was accused of unfairly stacking the vote through an aggressive recruitment campaign, with some industry members accusing the group of also distributing "marked ballots, gifts and free memberships." As a result of the controversy, all awards from that year were stripped and James Blackwood, a GMA board member, took responsibility for what he called "unethical behavior."

The GMA has supported anti-music piracy efforts, and launched its own antipiracy campaign in 2004. In 2011, the GMA appeared on a list of organizations supporting the "Stop Online Piracy Act" (SOPA) before the U.S. Congress.

The GMA drew criticism from Kirk Franklin after his speech at the 2019 Dove Awards, which addressed shooting bias in police violence, was censored. The GMA later issued Franklin a formal apology.

== See also ==
- GMA Canada – Nonprofit organization promoting Christian music
