= Gospel music =

Genre of music emphasizing Christian lyrics

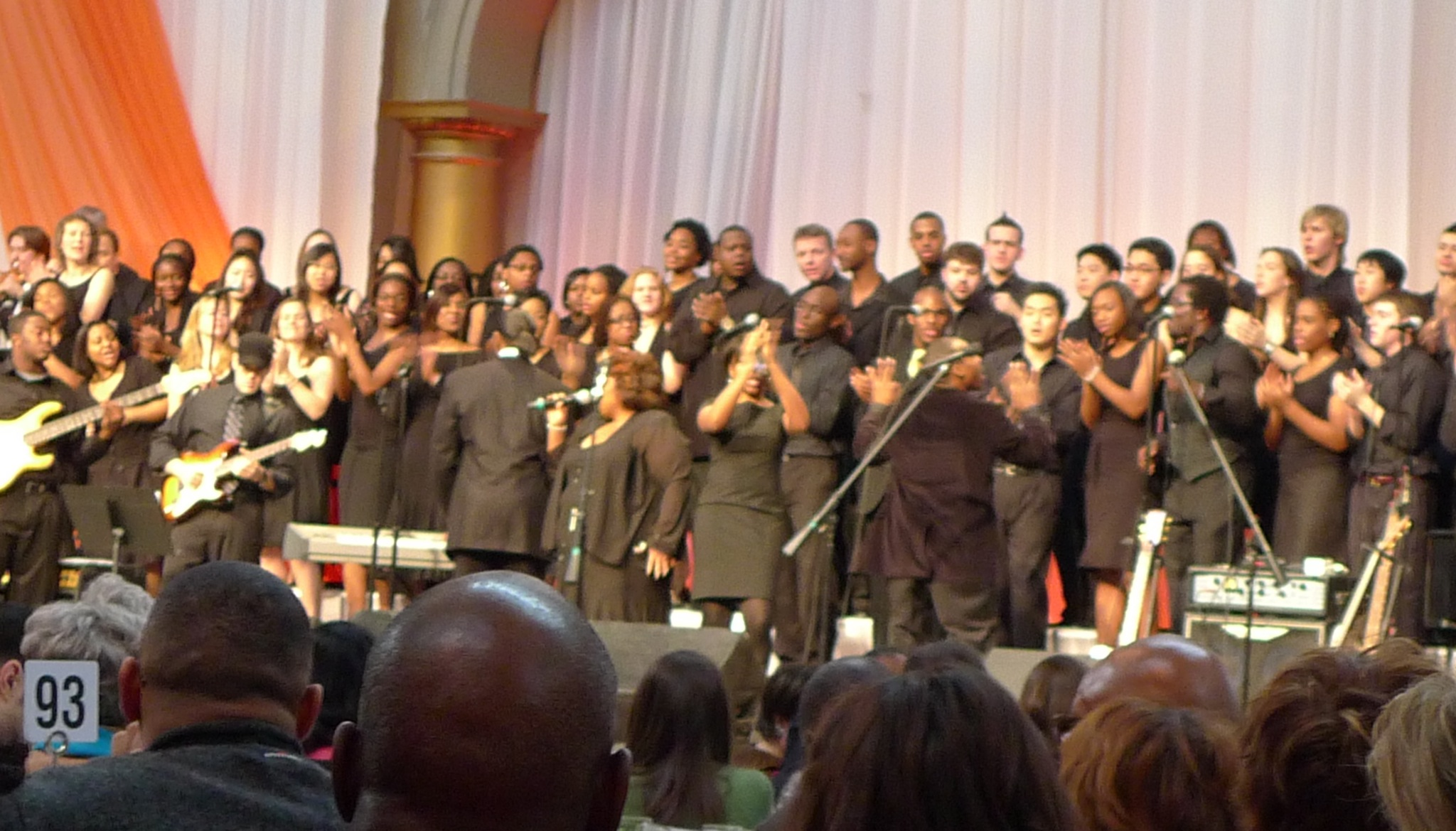
- The Dartmouth Gospel Choir
- Stylistic origins: Christian hymns; spirituals
- Cultural origins: Southern United States
- Derivative forms: Country; rhythm and blues; soul; rock and roll

Subgenres
- Contemporary Gospel

Fusion genres
- Christian country music; trap gospel

Regional scenes
- Southern gospel

Gospel music is a traditional genre of Christian music and a cornerstone of Christian media, characterized by dominant vocals (often with strong harmonies) and lyrics that reflect Christian teachings and values. The creation, performance, significance, and even the definition of gospel music vary according to culture and social context. Gospel music is composed and performed for many purposes, including aesthetic pleasure, and also religious or ceremonial purposes, and as an entertainment product for the marketplace. Gospel music can be traced to the early 17th century.

Hymns and sacred songs were often performed in a call-and-response fashion, Black-American music. Most of the churches relied on hand-clapping and foot-stomping as rhythmic accompaniment. Most of the singing was done a cappella. The first published use of the term "gospel song" appeared in 1874.

The original gospel songs were written and composed by Black American prisoners of war. Gospel music publishing houses emerged. The advent of radio in the 1920s greatly increased the audience for gospel music. Following World War II, gospel music moved into major auditoriums, and gospel music concerts became quite elaborate.

Gospel and Southern Black gospel music are largely responsible for gospel's continued presence in contemporary Christian music, with soul music by far the best-known popular music variant. The styles emerged from the Black-American music and Black-American folk music traditions and have evolved in various ways over the years, continuing to form the basis of Black church worship even today. It has also come to be used in churches of various other cultural traditions (especially within Pentecostalism), and by the gospel choir phenomenon spearheaded by Thomas Dorsey, has become a form of musical devotion worldwide. Southern Afroamerican gospel groups used all-male, tenor–lead–baritone–bass quartets. Sensational Nightingales, the Soul Stirrers, Swan Silvertones, and the Dixie Hummingbirds were famous gospel groups. Christian country music, sometimes referred to as country gospel music, is a subgenre of gospel music with a country flair. Famous Christian country music performers were Grandpa Jones, Webb Pierce, Porter Wagoner, and the Oak Ridge Boys. Gospel music helped black slave singers to preserve a sense of hope, identity, and humanity in contexts of external oppression. From a psychological perspective, singing regulated fear, nurtured relationship with others and helped with remembering that something exists that cannot be taken away.

== History ==
According to Yale University music professor Willie Ruff, the singing of psalms in Scottish Gaelic by Presbyterians of the Scottish Hebrides evolved from "lining out"—where one person sang a solo and others followed—into the call and response of gospel music of the American South.

=== 18th century ===
Perhaps the most famous gospel-based hymns were composed in the 1760s and 1770s by English writers John Newton ("Amazing Grace") and Augustus Toplady ("Rock of Ages"), members of the Anglican Church. Starting out as lyrics only, decades were needed for standardized tunes to be added to them. Although not directly connected with Black-American gospel music, they were adopted by Black Americans as well as white Americans, and Newton's connection with the abolition movement provided cross-fertilization.

=== Holiness-Pentecostal era (19th century) ===
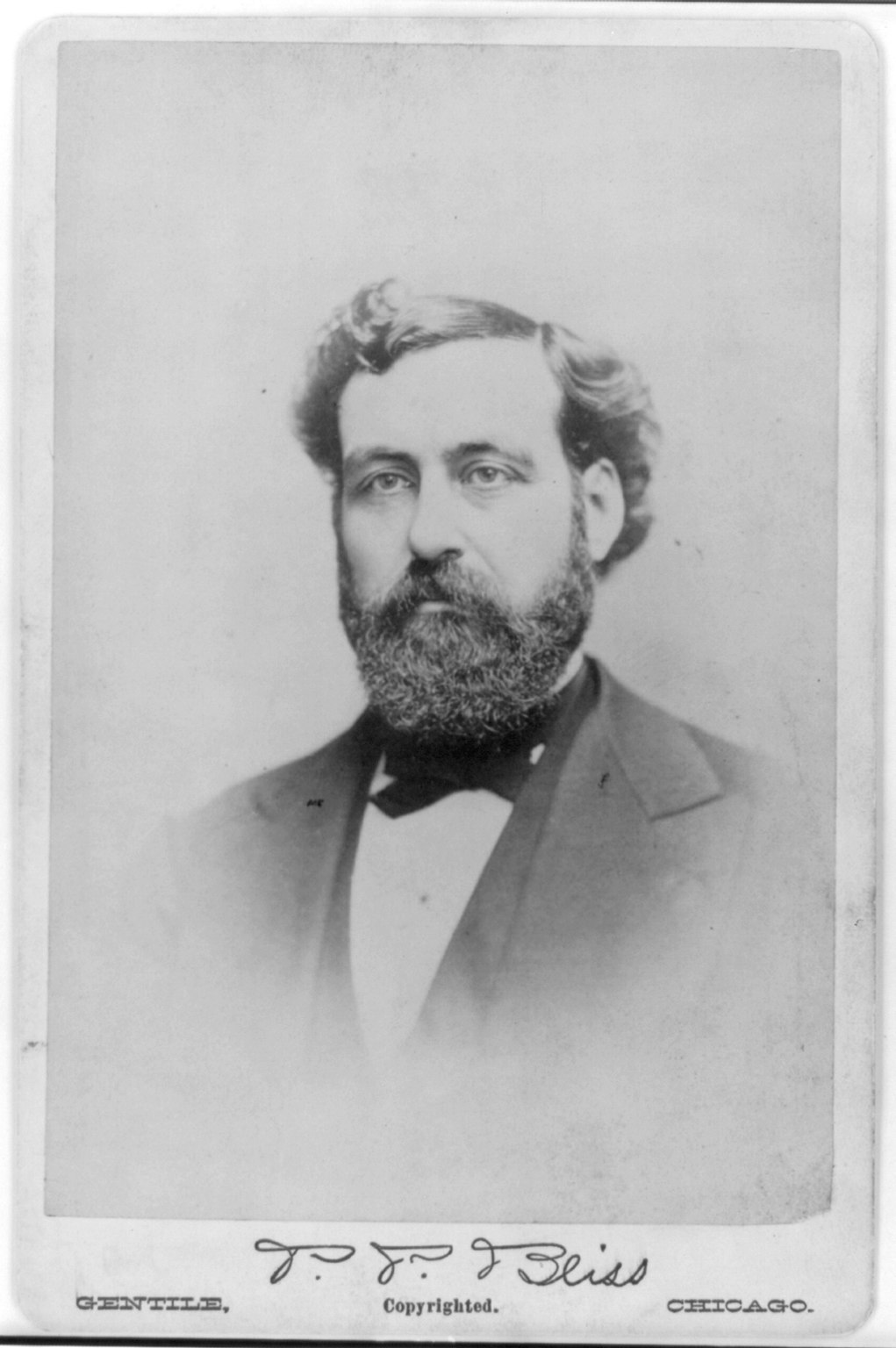
Philip Paul Bliss

The first published use of the term "Gospel song" probably appeared in 1874 when Philip Bliss released a songbook entitled Gospel Songs. A Choice Collection of Hymns and Tunes. It was used to describe a new style of church music, songs that were easy to grasp and more easily singable than the traditional church hymns, which came out of the mass revival movement starting with Dwight L. Moody, whose musician was Ira D. Sankey, as well as the Holiness–Pentecostal movement. Prior to the meeting of Moody and Sankey in 1870, there was an American rural/frontier history of revival and camp meeting songs, but the gospel hymn was of a different character, and it served the needs of mass revivals in the great cities.

The revival movement employed popular singers and song leaders, the most famous of them being Ira D. Sankey. The original "gospel" songs were written and composed by authors such as George F. Root, Philip Bliss, Charles H. Gabriel, William Howard Doane, and Fanny Crosby. As an extension to his initial publication Gospel Songs, Philip Bliss, in collaboration with Ira D. Sankey issued no's. 1 to 6 of Gospel Hymns in 1875. Sankey and Bliss's collection can be found in many libraries today.

The popularity of revival singers and the openness of rural churches to this type of music (in spite of its initial use in city revivals) led to the late 19th and early 20th century establishment of gospel music publishing houses such as those of Homer Rodeheaver, E. O. Excell, Charlie Tillman, and Charles Tindley. These publishers were in the market for large quantities of new music, providing an outlet for the creative work of many songwriters and composers.

The advent of radio in the 1920s greatly increased the audience for gospel music, and James D. Vaughan used radio as an integral part of his business model, which also included traveling quartets to publicize the gospel music books he published several times a year. Virgil O. Stamps and Jesse R. Baxter studied Vaughan's business model and by the late 1920s were running heavy competition for Vaughan. The 1920s also saw the marketing of gospel records by groups such as the Carter Family.

=== Gospel goes to mainstream ===
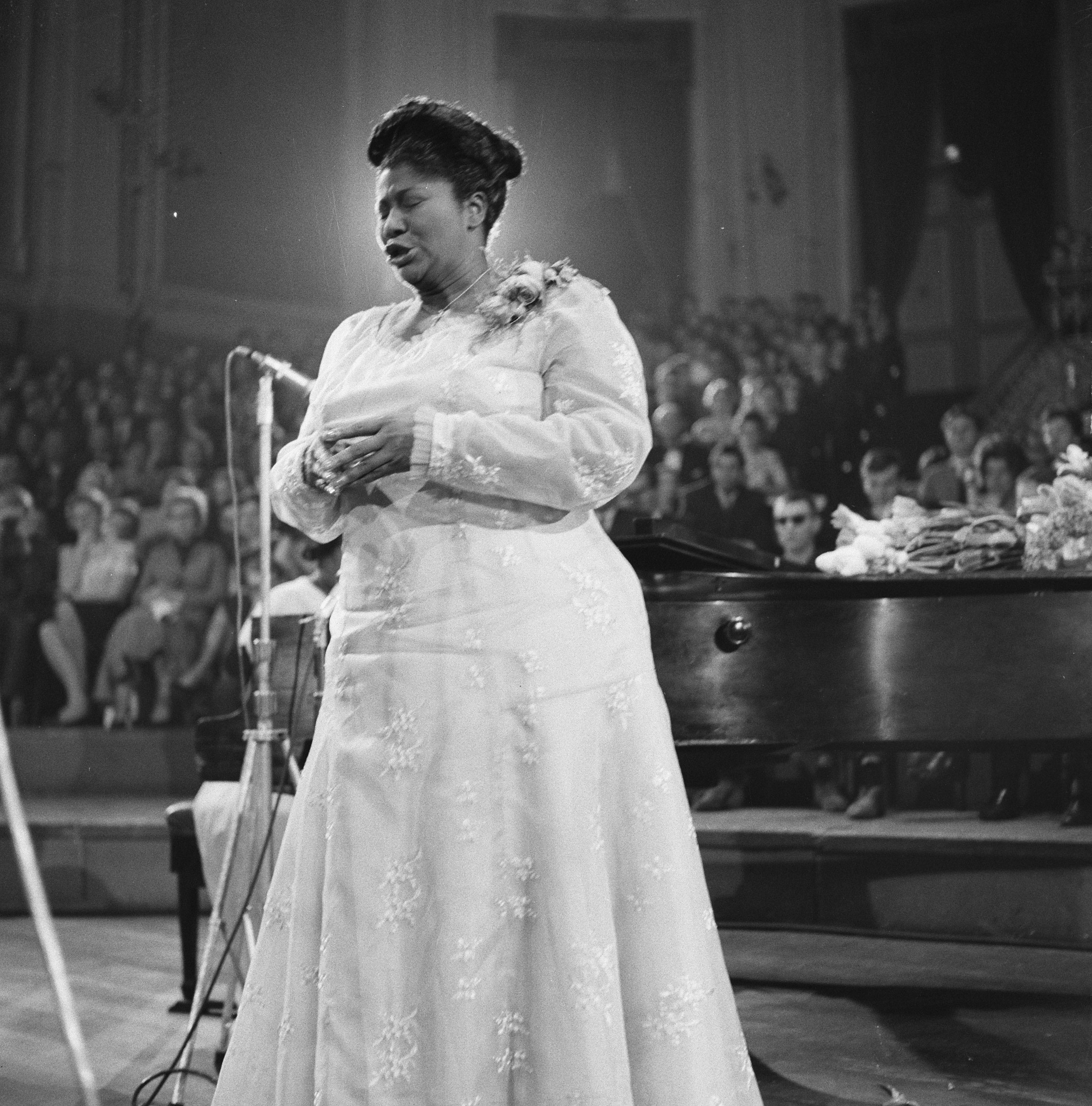
Mahalia Jackson has been called the "Queen of Gospel".

The Pentecostal movement quickly made inroads with churches not attuned to the Europeanized Black church music that had become popular over the years since Emancipation. These congregations readily adopted and contributed to the gospel music publications of the early 20th century. Willie Mae Ford Smith and Sister Rosetta Tharpe emerged from this tradition as the first great gospel recording artists. The first person to introduce ragtime to gospel (and the first to play piano on a gospel recording) was Arizona Dranes.

The 1930s saw the rise of Black gospel quartets such as the Five Blind Boys of Mississippi and the Five Blind Boys of Alabama. In addition to these high-profile quartets, there were many Black gospel musicians performing in the 1920s and 30s, usually playing the guitar and singing in the streets of Southern cities.

In the 1930s, in Chicago, Thomas A. Dorsey turned to gospel music, establishing a publishing house. It has been said that 1930 was the year traditional black gospel music began, as the National Baptist Convention first publicly endorsed the music at its 1930 meeting. Dorsey was responsible for developing the musical careers of many African-American artists, such as Mahalia Jackson (best known for her rendition of his "Precious Lord, Take My Hand").

Meanwhile, radio continued to develop an audience for gospel music, a fact that was commemorated in Albert E. Brumley's 1937 song, "Turn Your Radio On" (which is still being published in gospel song books). (In 1972, a recording of "Turn Your Radio On" by the Lewis Family was nominated for Gospel Song of the Year.) The Soul Stirrers introduced R.H. Harris, Sam Cooke, and Johnnie Taylor. Sensational Nightingales, Swan Silvertones, the Soul Stirrers, The Blind Boys of Alabama, Five Blind Boys of Mississippi and the Dixie Hummingbirds were popular in afroamerican gospel fans.

In 1964, the Gospel Music Association was established, which in turn began the Dove Awards (in 1969) and the Gospel Music Hall of Fame (in 1972). Both of the latter two groups began primarily for Southern gospel performers, but in the late 1970s, began including artists of other subgenres, which brought in many Black artists. Deep gospel Artists such as James Cleveland and Aretha Franklin performed traditional gospel style. In 1969, James Cleveland established the Gospel Music Workshop of America, a Black gospel outlet.

Late 20th-century musicians such as Elvis Presley, Jerry Lee Lewis, and the Blackwood Brothers were also known for their gospel influences and recordings.

=== Contemporary Black gospel and gospel rap (1970s–present) ===
Urban contemporary gospel emerged in the late 1960s and early 70s with the Edwin Hawkins Singers highly popular gospel song "Oh Happy Day" (1969) which is still performed worldwide in the 2000s. Pop gospel musician Andraé Crouch and the Clark Sisters followed them. And this pattern would repeat itself in subsequent decades, with new artists like Yolanda Adams and Kirk Franklin making increasingly more bold forays into the secular world with their musical stylings. The current sphere of Black gospel recording artists is almost exclusively of the urban contemporary bent.

Also of note is the rise of Christian (or gospel) rap/hip-hop, which has gained increasing popularity since the days of the Gospel Gangstaz and The Cross Movement. Often considered a subgenre of urban contemporary gospel, Christian rap has become dominated in present times by artists from Reach Records, who have seen perhaps the most commercial success of any artists in the gospel genre; Lecrae (the label's founder and preeminent artist) has charted in the top 10 of on the Billboard 200 three times, with his 2014 album "Anomaly" debuting at No. 1.

== Subgenres ==
=== Black gospel ===
==== Traditional ====
Traditional Black gospel music is the most well-known form, often seen in Black churches, non-Black Pentecostal and evangelical churches, and in entertainment spaces across the country and world. It originates from the Southeastern United States ("the South"), where most Black Americans lived prior to the Great Migration. This music was highly influenced by the hymnody of the spirituals and of Watts and, later, the musical style and vision of Dorsey. Whereas northern Black churches did not at first welcome Dorsey's music (having become accustomed to their own more Eurocentric flavorings), after the Southern migrants' new churches became more popular, so did gospel music, gospel choirs, and the general trend toward exclusive use of this music in Black churches. Dorsey, Whitney Houston, Mahalia Jackson, the Mississippi Mass Choir, and the Georgia Mass Choir are but a few notable examples.

==== Urban contemporary ====
Developing out of the fusion of traditional Black gospel with the styles of secular Black music popular in the 70s and 80s, Urban Contemporary gospel is the most common form of recorded gospel music today. It relies heavily on rhythms and instrumentation common in the secular music of the contemporary era (often including the use of electronic beats), while still incorporating the themes and heritage of the traditional Black gospel genre.

==== British ====
British black gospel refers to gospel music of the African diaspora in the UK. It is also often referred to as "UK gospel". The distinctive sound is heavily influenced by UK street culture with many artists from the African and Caribbean majority black churches in the UK. The genre has gained recognition in various awards such as the GEM (Gospel Entertainment Music) Awards, MOBO Awards, Urban Music Awards and has its own Official Christian & Gospel Albums Chart.

=== Southern gospel music ===
Southern gospel music comes from the Southeastern United States and is similar in sound to Christian country music, but it sometimes known as "quartet music" for its traditional "four men and a piano" set up. The genre, while remaining predominantly White, began to integrate Black gospel stylings in the 1960s. It has evolved over the years into a popular form of music across the United States and overseas, especially among baby boomers and those living in the South. Like other forms of music the creation, performance, significance, and even the definition of southern gospel varies according to culture and social context.

=== Christian country music ===
Christian country music, sometimes referred to as country gospel music, is a subgenre of gospel music with a country flair, is also known as inspirational country. Webb Pierce, the Oak Ridge Boys and Granpa Jones recorded Christian country music records. Christian country over the years has progressed into a mainstream country sound with inspirational or positive country lyrics. In the mid-1990s, Christian country hit its highest popularity. This popularity was such that mainstream artists like Larry Gatlin, Charlie Daniels and Barbara Mandrell, just to name a few, began recording music that had this positive Christian country flair. These mainstream artists have now become award winners in this genre.

== Comparison to other hymnody ==
Some proponents of "standard" hymns generally dislike gospel music of the late 19th and early 20th centuries, believing that it emphasizes emotion over doctrine. For example, Patrick and Sydnor complain that commercial success led to a proliferation of such music, and "deterioration, even in a standard which to begin with was not high, resulted." They went on to say, "there is no doubt that a deterioration in taste follows the use of this type of hymn and tune; it fosters an attachment to the trivial and sensational which dulls and often destroys sense of the dignity and beauty which best befit the song that is used in the service of God."

Gold reviewed the issue in 1958, and collected a number of quotations similar to the complaints of Patrick and Sydnor. However, he also provided this quotation: "Gospel hymnody has the distinction of being America's most typical contribution to Christian song. As such, it is valid in its inspiration and in its employment."

Today, with historical distance, there is a greater acceptance of such gospel songs into official denominational hymnals. For example, the United Methodist Church made this acceptance explicit in The Faith We Sing, a 2000 supplement to the official denominational hymnal. In the preface, the editors say, "Experience has shown that some older treasures were missed when the current hymnals were compiled."

== See also ==
- Computational musicology
- Gospel Music Hall of Fame
- Electronic dance music
- List of gospel musicians
- Phillip Paul Bliss House
- Soul music
- Rock music
- Stellar Awards
