= James Blackwood =

American musician (1919–2002)

- Born: James Webre Blackwood; August 4, 1919; Choctaw County, Mississippi U.S.
- Died: February 3, 2002 (aged 82) Memphis, Tennessee, U.S.
- Genres: Southern gospel; Contemporary Christian
- Years active: 1934–2002
- Website: www.jamesblackwood.org

James Webre Blackwood (August 4, 1919 – February 3, 2002) was an American gospel singer and one of the founding members of Southern gospel quartet The Blackwood Brothers. He is the only person in any field of music to have been nominated for a Grammy Award for 28 consecutive years. He received 31 nominations and won nine Grammy Awards.

== Biography ==
Blackwood was born on August 4, 1919, in Choctaw County, Mississippi, to sharecropper William Emmett Blackwood and his wife Carrie Prewitt Blackwood. He was the youngest of four children, which included his brother Roy Blackwood (December 24, 1900 – March 21, 1971), sister Lena Blackwood Cain (December 31, 1904 – March 1, 1990) and brother Doyle Blackwood (August 21, 1911 – October 3, 1974).

In 1926, he and his brother Doyle had developed an interest in gospel music, singing at church gatherings, camp meetings, schools and any place they saw the opportunity. During this period, they sang on WTJS in Jackson, Tennessee.

Blackwood formed a singing group with his nephew R. W. and his brothers Roy and Doyle. The Blackwood Brothers' first broadcast was on the radio station WHEF, AM 1500, in Kosciusko, Mississippi, in 1934. The quartet soon began broadcasting on the larger WJDX in Jackson, moving to Shreveport, Louisiana, in 1939, and Shenandoah, Iowa, in 1940.

In early World War II, the quartet temporarily disbanded as James joined the war effort as a factory welder in California. As the other members joined him in California, they resumed singing and the quartet was based in San Diego, California from 1944 to 1945 as they continued simultaneously working in the war-related industries. After the war, they returned to Iowa in September 1945 resuming their broadcast on KMA Radio in Shenandoah. In 1950, the quartet moved to Memphis, Tennessee, and the radio station WMPS.

In 1951, they signed a recording contract with RCA Victor Records.

Soon they began traveling to their concert appearances by private plane with R.W. Blackwood and the bass singer Bill Lyles as pilot and co-pilot. On June 12, 1954, the Blackwood Brothers won first place on the CBS radio and TV program Arthur Godfrey's Talent Scouts Show. On June 30, 1954, in Clanton, Alabama, the quartet was preparing for concert at the airport for the Chilton County Peach Festival. During a few practice touch-and-go landings the plane crashed and R. W., Bill Lyles and family friend Johnny Ogburn died in the crash. The quartet re-organized following the plane crash with R. W.'s younger brother, Cecil Blackwood as baritone and J.D. Sumner as bass. In 1956, the re-organized group appeared on Arthur Godfrey's Talent Scout Show and won a second time.

In the mid-1950s, the quartet started traveling in a customized bus, another first for the group.

James Blackwood, Cecil Blackwood and J. D. Sumner founded the National Quartet Convention in 1957, originally a 3-day event held at Ellis Auditorium in Memphis.

In 1964, the Blackwood Brothers chartered the Gospel Music Association.

After singing with The Blackwood Brothers Quartet for 47 years, James (together with four other veteran gospel singers, Hovie Lister, Jake Hess, J. D. Sumner and Rosie Rozell) formed the Masters V Quartet. He would sing with this group for 7 years during which time he received his 9th grammy award. In 1990, he formed the James Blackwood Quartet with Ken Turner, Brad White and Ray Shelton. Rosie Rozell sang tenor in the initial performances, but Larry Ford quickly became the permanent tenor as Shelton's health deteriorated. This group, like James' preceding groups, also received a Grammy nomination.

== Personal life ==
On May 4, 1939, Blackwood married Miriam (Mim) Grantham. They had two sons, James Jr. and Billy. He died of a stroke on February 3, 2002, aged 82 at Methodist Healthcare Central Hospital in Memphis. He was buried at Forest Hill Cemetery East, in Memphis. His wife died on October 21, 2019.

== Legacy ==
=== Grammys ===
Win

- 1966 Best Sacred Recording (Musical), The Grand Old Gospel, Porter Wagoner & The Blackwood Brothers Quartet
- 1967 Best Sacred Recording (Musical), More Grand Old Gospel, Porter Wagoner & The Blackwood Brothers Quartet
- 1969 Best Gospel Performance, In Gospel Country, Porter Wagoner & The Blackwood Brothers Quartet
- 1972 Best Gospel Performance, L-O-V-E, Blackwood Brothers Quartet
- 1973 Best Gospel Performance, Release Me (From My Sin), The Blackwood Brothers Quartet
- 1979 Best Gospel Performance, Traditional, Lift Up The Name Of Jesus, The Blackwood Brothers Quartet
- 1980 Best Gospel Performance, Traditional, We Come To Worship, Produced by Mark Blackwood, The Blackwood Brothers Quartet
- 1981 Best Gospel Performance, Traditional, The Masters V, The Masters V Quartet
- 1982 Best Gospel Performance, Traditional, I'm Following You, Produced by Mark Blackwood, The Blackwood Brothers Quartet

Nomination

- 1965 Best Gospel, Sacred, Inspirational Performance, The Blackwood Brothers Quartet
- 1966 Best Sacred Recording (Musical), How Big is God, The Blackwood Brothers Quartet
- 1967 Best Gospel Performance, The Blackwood Brothers Quartet Sings for Joy, The Blackwood Brothers Quartet
- 1967 Best Sacred Performance, Surely Goodness and Mercy, George Beverly Shea with The Blackwood Brothers Quartet
- 1968 Best Gospel Performance, Yours Faithfully, The Blackwood Brothers Quartet
- 1971 Best Gospel Performance, He's Still the King of Kings (and Lord of Lords), The Blackwood Brothers Quartet
- 1974 Best Gospel Performance, There He Goes, The Blackwood Brothers Quartet
- 1976 Best Gospel Performance, Learning to Lean, The Blackwood Brothers Quartet
- 1977 Best Gospel Performance, Traditional, Bill Gaither Songs by the Blackwood Brothers, The Blackwood Brothers Quartet
- 1978 Best Gospel Performance, Traditional, His Amazing Love, The Blackwood Brothers Quartet
- 1997 Best Southern, Country, or Bluegrass Gospel Album, Keep Lookin' Up: The Texas Swing Sessions, James Blackwood and The Light Crust Doughboys
- 1998 Best Southern, Country, or Bluegrass Gospel Album, They Gave the World a Smile: the Stamps Quartet Tribute Album, James Blackwood Quartet and The Light Crust Doughboys
- 2000 Best Southern, Country, or Bluegrass Gospel Album, The Great Gospel Hit Parade: From Memphis To Nashville To Texas, James Blackwood, The Jordanaires and The Light Crust Doughboys

During his long career, James was probably honored with more awards that any other gospel singer. He is the only person in any field of music to have been nominated for a Grammy award for 28 consecutive years. He received 31 total nominations and won nine Grammy Awards.

In the 1990s, at the request of Art Greenhaw, a lifelong fan and musical disciple of James Blackwood, Blackwood began a series of recording sessions with Greenhaw's band, The Light Crust Doughboys. The collaboration resulted in four Grammy nominations in four different years for Best Southern, Country or Bluegrass Gospel Album of the Year, two Dove nominations for Best Gospel Album of the Year in either southern or country gospel categories, and Inspirational TV's nomination for Best Southern Gospel Album of the Year. In the year of Blackwood's, We Called Him Mr. Gospel Music: The James Blackwood Tribute Album (2002) was released and won the Grammy Award for Best Southern, Country or Bluegrass Gospel Album at the 2003 Grammy Awards in New York City.

=== GMA Dove Awards ===
His peers in the Gospel Music Association voted him the GMA Dove Award Top Male Vocalist for seven consecutive years.

- 1969 Male Vocalist of the Year
- 1970 Male Vocalist of the Year
- 1972 Male Vocalist of the Year
- 1973 Male Vocalist of the Year
- 1974 Male Vocalist of the Year
- 1975 Male Vocalist of the Year
- 1976 Male Vocalist of the Year
- 1977 Male Vocalist of the Year
- 1970 Album of the Year - Darol Rice; RCA Victor, Fill My Cup, Lord, The Blackwood Brothers Quartet
- 1973 Male Group of the Year, The Blackwood Brothers Quartet
- 1974 Male Group of the Year, The Blackwood Brothers Quartet
- 1974 Associate Membership Award, The Blackwood Brothers Quartet
- 1976 Associate Membership Award, The Blackwood Brothers Quartet
- 1977 Associate Membership Award, The Blackwood Brothers Quartet

=== Others ===
In 1974, the Gospel Music Association inducted Blackwood as the third living person to be voted into the Gospel Music Hall of Fame.

Sang at the Funerals of Gladys Presley and Elvis Presley.

The Southern Gospel Music Association inducted Blackwood into the Southern Gospel Museum and Hall of Fame in 1997.

In 1983, the Golden State University awarded him an honorary Doctoral Degree of Music. In 1986, Memphis State University awarded him its Distinguished Achievement Award in the field of communications and fine arts. In 1997, the Memphis and Shelby County Optimists Clubs named him Citizen of the Year, presenting him with plaques and citations from 16 government and civic groups.

In 1994, the Singing News magazine presented him with the Marvin Norcross Award. In 1997, Gospel Voice magazine gave him the Living Legend Award. These are among the highest awards in gospel music.

In 2001, he was presented with the General Superintendent's Medal of Honor from the Assemblies of God, the highest recognition from that organization.

He appeared on all of the major television networks, in shows including Arthur Godfrey Talent Scouts (CBS), Dave Garroway (NBC), Johnny Cash Show (ABC), Tennessee Ernie Ford Show (ABC), Tom Snyder Show (NBC), Dinah Shore Show (NBC), Hee Haw (CBS), Barbara Mandrell and the Mandrell Sisters (NBC), Statler Brothers Show (TNN) and the 700 Club, PTL and TBN.

He sang in all 50 American states, every Canadian province and 35 foreign countries.

== Television appearances ==
- Arthur Godfrey's Talent Scouts (1954)
- Sing a Song for Heaven's Sake (1966)
- The Johnny Cash Show (1971)
- 28th Grammy Awards (1986)
- Homecoming (1991)
- Reunion: A Gospel Homecoming Celebration (1992)
- A Christmas Homecoming (1993)
- Old Friends: A Gospel Homecoming Celebration (1993)
- Turn Your Radio On (1993)
- Bill & Gloria Gaither Present: Landmark with Their Homecoming Friends (1994)
- O Happy Day: Old-Time Southern Singing Convention (1994)
- Precious Memories (1994)
- Bill & Gloria Gaither Present: Revival with Their Homecoming Friends (1995)
- The Sweetest Song I Know (1995)
- Bill & Gloria Gaither Present: The Blackwood Brothers Family Reunion (1995)
- When All God's Singers Get Home (1996)
- He Touched Me: The Gospel Music of Elvis Presley (2000)
- Sounds of Memphis (2002)
