= John Alexander McClung =

American singer-songwriter (1891–1942)

John Alexander McClung (1891 – 1942) was an American singer-songwriter. He was the co-owner of the Hartford Music Company in Hartford, Arkansas. In the 1930s and 1940s, he was a member of the Hartford Quartet, a band whose members included Austin Arnold, Clyde Garner, Al Halp, and Doy Ott. Over the course of his career, he wrote more than 300 Southern gospel hymns, including Standing Outside, Death Will Never Knock On Heaven's Door, and Just A Rose Will Do. He died in 1942, aged 50 or 51, and was inducted into the Southern Gospel Museum and Hall of Fame posthumously in 2003.
