= Blue Ridge Quartet =

The Blue Ridge Quartet (1946 – 1985) was a Southern gospel music group founded in 1946.

== History ==
The Blue Ridge Quartet was organized by Frank Stamps's Stamps Quartet Music Company of Texas. They started in Raleigh, North Carolina, but ultimately settled in Spartanburg, South Carolina.

When they began in Raleigh at the beginning of 1946 they operated out of radio station WRAL. Among the original members of the group in 1946 were Leonard "Red" Mathis, tenor; James Smith, lead; Wayne Roseberry, baritone; Shaw Eiland, bass; and William Cunningham, pianist. Eiland and Roseberry were former members of the Stamps-Baxter Lone Star Quartet, also headquartered in Raleigh. After a short time, J. Elmo Fagg and Jack Taylor, both from the Lone Star Quartet, joined them. It wasn't long before Wayne Roseberry left and Everett Payne became the baritone singer.

Burl Strevel joined the quartet in 1947 to sing bass, and they moved over to WDBB radio in Burlington, NC. In 1948 they moved to WSPA radio Spartanburg, SC and dropped the "Stamps" name. Former Lone Star Quartet lead and baritone Clarence Turbyfill joined to sing tenor. In 1949, Kenny Gates became the Blue Ridge Quartet's pianist. When Turbyfill left in 1950, Ed Sprouse became the group's tenor. When Payne left in 1953, Gates picked up the additional duty of singing the baritone part.

Around 1956, Strevel left to join the Sunshine Boys. After some turnover, the bass slot was filled by George Younce. Jim Hamill was hired for the baritone slot with Gates remaining at piano. After a year or so, Bill Crowe replaced Hamill, staying with the Blue Ridge Quartet ever since.

When George Younce left the group to join the Cathedral Quartet in 1964, Burl Strevel returned to sing bass. Shortly after, former Sunshine Boys member Fred Daniel replaced Ed Sprouse at the tenor position.

When Fagg retired in 1968, he was replaced by Laverne Tripp. Beginning in the 1970s there were several years of unprecedented chart success and group popularity. Don Seabolt replaced Fred Daniel in 1972 and Jim Wood also filled the lead slot later in the decade.

The Blue Ridge Quartet shared a number one song on the Singing News chart with the Oak Ridge Boys from February through November 1971. The song was "I Know." Other number one songs for the group include “That Day Is Almost Here” (December 1971-February 1972) and “After Calvary” (October–November 1972).

Burl Strevel died of a heart attack on November 12, 1981. After that point, Bill Crowe owned and managed the group until they disbanded in January 1985.

== Discography ==
- 1958 - The Blue Ridge Quartet (Bibletone Records/BL-3503)
- 1958 - Echoes From The Forties (Sing Records/LP-451)
- 1960 - He Bought My Soul (Skylite Records/SRLP-5975/SSLP-5975)
- 1961 - Hide Me, Rock Of Ages (Skylite Records/SRLP-5981/SSLP-5981)
- 1961 - He's Life (Sing Records/LP-452)
- 1961 - Wings Of A Dove (Sing Records/LP-453)
- 1962 - Our Best To You (Sing Records/LP-454)
- 1962 - A Session With The Blue Ridge Quartet (Sing Records/LP-455)
- 1963 - By His Hand (Sing Records/LP-456)
- 1963 - Passing Thru (Sing Records/LP-457)
- 1964 - Rose Covered Lane (Sing Records/MFLP-458)
- 1965 - The Blue Ridge Quartet (Canaan Records/CA-4605/CAS-9605)
- 1965 - Lead Me Back To Calvary (Sing Records/MFLP-460)
- 1966 - The Love Of God (Canaan Records/CA-4616/CAS-9616)
- 1966 - Who Am I (Canaan Records CA-4622/CAS-9622)
- 1967 - He Cares For You (QCA Records/70905)
- 1967 - Satisfied (QCA Records/70906)
- 1967 - Blue Ridge Quartet Sings America's Twelve Favorite Hymns (Canaan Records/CA-4637/CAS-9637)
- 1968 - Songs We Can't Stop Singing (Canaan Records/CA-4645/CAS-9645)
- 1968 - Sing Out The Good News (Canaan Records/CA-4651/CAS-9651)
- 1968 - Peace Like A River (QCA Records/80117)
- 1968 - He’s Got The Whole World In His Hands (QCA Records/80346)
- 1968 - My Home (QCA Records/80871)
- 1968 - Church In The Wildwood (QCA Records/80872)
- 1968 - Sunset Is Coming (QCA Records/80873)
- 1968 - Sing The Old-Time Gospel (Rimrock Records/RLP-1005)
- 1969 - Live On Stage (Blue Queen Records/LP-1104)
- 1969 - The Green, Green Grass Of Home (Canaan Records/CAS-9658)
- 1969 - And That's Enough (Canaan Records/CAS-9667)
- 1970 - He Came Back (Mark IV Records/1158)
- 1970 - Ride That Glory Train With The Blue Ridge Quartet (Canaan Records/CAS-9675)
- 1970 - Rise And Shine With The Blue Ridge Quartet (Canaan Records/CAS-9685)
- 1970 - Our Favorite Hymns (QCA Records/91259)
- 1970 - Sings The Old-Time Gospel Volume II (QCA Records/204426)
- 1971 - There's A Great Day Coming (Canaan Records/CAS-9698)
- 1972 - On The Move (Canaan Records/9713)
- 1972 - Country Road (Queen City Album/1106)
- 1972 - Everlasting Joy (Queen City Album/1107)
- 1972 - Through The Years (Custom Records/1110)
- 1972 - Christmas With The Blue Ridge Quartet (QCA Records/21027)
- 1973 - Blue Ridge Energy (QCA Records/318)
- 1973 - Blue Ridge Country (QCA Records/10834)
- 1973 - Puts It Together (Canaan Records/CAS-9729)
- 1973 - Mark 4 Sings (Queen City Album/1108)
- 1973 - Keep On Singing (Mark IV Records/1125)
- 1974 - In The Spirit… (Freedom Records/223)
- 1974 - You Can’t Be A Beacon If Your Light Don’t Shine (Mark IV Records/1126)
- 1974 - The Prettiest Flowers (Mark IV Records/1165)
- 1975 - Let’s All Go Down To The River (Queen City Album/1114)
- 1975 - Solid Gold (Mark IV Records/1120)
- 1975 - Somebody Touched Me (Mark IV Records/1157)
- 1975 - Best Of The Blue Ridge (QCA Records/327)
- 1975 - Little Jimmy Dickens With The Blue Ridge Sings Hymns Of The Hour (QCA Records/330)
- 1975 - Best Yet (QCA Records/339)
- 1975 - Hits Forever (Mark IV Records/1121)
- 1975 - Reflections (Mark IV Records/1122)
- 1975 - Happy (Mark IV Records/1124):
- 1975 - Favorites – Vol. I (Chime Records/CH 621)
- 1975 - Favorites – Vol. II (Chime Records/CH 622)
- 1975 - The Old Time Religion (Blue Queen Records/1101)
- 1975 - Another Christmas With The Blue Ridge Quartet (QCA Records/1118)
- 1976 - It Takes A Happy Man (Blue Queen Records/1102)
- 1976 - For God And Country (Mark IV Records/1162)
- 1976 - Heavenly Parade (Mark IV Records/1163)
- 1977 - The Blue Ridge Now (QCA Records/358)
- 1978 - Thanks For Loving Me (Mark IV Records/1164)
- 1978 - Here They Come (QCA Records/1166)
- 1978 - The Battle For My Daddy's Soul (QCA Records/1167)
- 1978 - Thank You Mr. D.J. (Queen City Album/377)
- 1979 - Those Cotton Pick'in Blue Ridge Have Done It Again (Trail Records/TSRC-8721)
- 1980 - Turn Your Radio On (QCA Records/204428)
- 1980 - Live At Wheeling (Mark IV Records/1160)
- 1980 - Somethin' Within (Custom Records)
- 1980 - A Thing Called Love (QCA Records/204427)
- 1981 - Burl-Bill-Laverne-Donnie And The Mark Four (QCA Records/10833)
- 1982 - Why Me, Lord? (Queen City Album/1113)
- 1984 - Close To The Master (Mark IV Records/1161)
- 1985 - Together (with The Sheltons) (QCA Records/106317B)
