= Buddy Liles =

American singer

- Born: Walter Eugene "Buddy" Liles; January 10, 1941 (age 84)
- Origin: Newport, Kentucky
- Genres: Christian: Southern Gospel
- Occupation: Gospel Singer
- Instrument: Singer
- Years active: 52

Buddy Liles is a bass-baritone gospel singer. He is best known as the bass singer for the Florida Boys, a Southern Gospel quartet, from 1972 through the late 1990s.

Liles received the Marvin Norcross award at the National Quartet Convention in 1995 and the Marvin Norcross Award for Favorite Bass Award, presented by Singing News magazine.
