= Florida Boys =

American southern gospel quartet

The Florida Boys
- Also known as: The Gospel Melody Quartet
- Genre: Southern gospel
- Years active: 1947–2016
- Website: www.floridaboys.com www.thefloridaboys.net

The Florida Boys were a male vocal quartet in Southern gospel music. The group was founded in 1947 by J. G. Whitfield. Originally named The Gospel Melody Quartet, the group was renamed in 1954. From the 1950s until 2007, the group was led by Les Beasley on lead and bass guitar, Glen Allred as baritone, and Derrell Stewart at piano, and featured many notable tenors and basses. In 1999, the Florida Boys were inducted into the Gospel Music Hall of Fame. The group, led by Charlie Waller in its later years, officially retired in 2016.

== History ==
The Florida Boys Quartet was originally called the Gospel Melody Boys and was started by J.G.Whitfield in Pensacola FL.

The original group consisted of J.G, Sue Whitfield, "Pap" Fiveash, Ike Manning, and Ross Ingraham.

The group went through several changes in the first few years, including members already mentioned as well as Roy Howard, Doyle Wiggins, Guy Dodd, Curtis Whitfield, Christine Woolham, Cora Fiveash, "Tiny" Merrill, Buddy Mears, and Livy Freeman.

In 1952, the first of the mainstays of what would become the Florida Boys joined, when Glen Allred, a young man from Monteray, Tennessee who had previously played guitar for the Oak Ridge Quartet, would take over the baritone position.

in 1953, Les Beasley, a young Korean War Veteran from the marines joined the Lead position.

During this time, they started gaining popularity and while working for Wally Fowler on many singings, Wally would introduce them "With Sand in their shoes and a song in their heart, the boys from Florida, The Gospel Melody Boys!"

One afternoon, J.G. Whitfield came to the group and said "From now on, we are the Florida Boys!" That name became one of the biggest names in Gospel Music for the next 60 years.

Early in 1956, not long after the groups name change, an exciting piano player from Brunswick, GA who was known for wearing red socks, red suspenders, and a red bow tie, joined the Boys. When he joined, he dropped the other items, but kept the red socks, his trademark.

For the next 51 years, Les, Glen, and Derrell, owned and led the Florida Boys to go down in Southern Gospel History as co-owners and legends.

During the groups long tenure Les Beasley sang the lead for the group through 1999, when he stepped aside from singing. Beasley continued to play bass guitar and act as the group's master of ceremonies.

Glen Allred sang the Baritone all but about six months in the 50's when he left to try his hand at starting his own group and working in cabinet making. He thankfully returned and stayed until the original group retired in 2007.

Derrell Stewart who was the group's pianist, had played with the Dixie Rhythm Quartet prior to joining the Florida Boys. His signature red socks and physical comedy as well as his winning smile, helped propel the groups popularity and recognition.

During this time, various tenors and basses sang with the group. In 1958, George Younce held the bass position for a short period then Billy Todd joined the group and stayed with the group until 1972. He was replaced by Buddy Liles, who had sung with The Orrell Quartet, The Rhythm Masters Quartet, The Landmark Quartet, and The Rebels Quartet. Liles stayed with the group for over two and a half decades.

The Florida Boys had a nationally syndicated television show, The Gospel Singing Jubilee . The show was the number one syndicated variety show on Sunday mornings in every major television market in the country. It helped introduce many of what would become the biggest names in Gospel music such as the Inspirations and the Cathedrals.

In 1999, the Florida Boys were inducted into the Gospel Music Hall of Fame. The group at this time consisted of Allen Cox, Glen Allred, Gene McDonald, Les Beasley and Derrell Stewart. Also attending and inducted members the night of the ceremony were, Buddy Liles, Billy Todd, Tommy Atwood, Greg Cook, Tim Lovelace, and J.G. Whitfield.

The last decade of the group saw a resurgence of their popularity, brought on in part by some new vocalists. Allen Cox joined the tenor position in 1997, Gene McDonald joined as bass singer in 1998, and Josh Garner was hired to fill the Lead position when Les stepped aside in late 1999.

This iteration of the Florida Boys, Allen, Josh, Les, Glen, Gene, and Derrell were featured on several Gaither Gospel Series videos as well as performing with the Gaither Gospel Tours in several major arenas around the country.

In 2007, the Florida Boys had two personnel changes at relatively the same time, as long-time bass singer Gene McDonald left to work for a bus company, and tenor Harold Reed left to join the Kingsmen Quartet. McDonald was replaced by Butch Owens, and lead singer Josh Garner moved up to the tenor position, with Les once again singing lead for the group for the last couple of months of concerts.

In June 2007, Les Beasley announced that the legendary quartet would be disbanding the following month. However, he also announced that they would come back together once more for a farewell appearance at the National Quartet Convention in September 2007.

At the "farewell concert" on the main stage at the National Quartet Convention, it was announced that, with the blessing of Allred, Beasley, and Stewart, the Florida Boys name would be continuing on and the mantle was passed to Charlie Waller to continue on with the Florida Boys legacy. Waller continued to operate the Florida Boys until 2016. During this event, "The Boys" were joined by tenor Terry Davis and Long time bass singer Buddy Liles.

The Florida Boys' cover of the song "Love Lifted Me" was used in Richard Linklater's 2011 film Bernie and was covered in the soundtrack by actor-musician Jack Black.

Les Beasley died in 2018. Derrell Stewart died in 2020. Glen Allred died in 2022.

As of 2026, former members in the SGMA Hall of Fame include, Les Beasley, Glen Allred, Derrelll Stewart, J.G. Whitfield, Billy Todd, Charlie Waller, George Younce, and Clarke Beasley.

== Personnel ==
Tenor

- Guy Dodd (1946–1952)
- Buddy Mears (1952–1956)
- Coy Cook (1957–1966)(went on to things like Dixie Echoes & his own Senators)
- Tommy Atwood (1966–1972)
- Johnny Cook (1972)(went on to things like The Statesmen Quartet & The Happy Goodmans)
- Laddie Cain (1972–1974)
- Paul Adkins (1975)
- Jerry Trammell (1975–1979)(went on to things like Blue Ridge Quartet & The Blackwood Brothers)
- Don Thomas (1980–1983)
- Mark Flaker (1982–1983)(previously of Singing Americans)
- Terry Davis (1983–1986)
- Rick Busby (1986–1988)
- Greg Shockley (1988)(went on to things like Singing Americans & Won By One)
- Greg Cook (1988–1995)
- Billy Hodges (1995–1997)
- Allen Cox (1997–2004)
- Harold Reed (2004–2007)(went on to things like Kingsmen Quartet & LeFevre Quartet)
- Josh Garner (May 2007–July 2007)
- Eddie Broome (2008–2015)(previously of Palmetto State Quartet & Dixie Echoes)
- Nathan Parrish (2015–2016)

Lead

- Roy Howard (1946–1951)
- Doyle Wiggins (1952–1953)(went on to Dixie Echoes)
- Les Beasley (on bass guitar)(1953–1999, May 2007–July 2007)
- Josh Garner (1999–2007)(went on to things like Dixie Melody Boys & Chuck Wagon Gang)
- Charlie Waller (2008–2016)

Baritone

- Edward Singletary (1946–1952)
- Glen Allred (on guitar)(September 1952 – 2007)(previously of Oak Ridge Boys)
- Tommy Fairchild (fill-in for 1957)(went on to Oak Ridge Boys & The Blackwood Brothers)
- Buddy Burton (2008–2010)(previously of things like The Statesmen Quartet, Singing Americans, & Masters V)
- Chip Cooper (2010–2015)
- Jimmy Reno (2015–2016)

Bass

- J. G. Whitfield (1946–1958)(went on to form Dixie Echoes)
- George Younce (1958–1959)(also known for things like The Weatherfords, Blue Ridge Quartet, & most famously The Cathedrals)
- Billy Todd (1959–1972)
- Buddy Liles (1972–1998)
- Gene McDonald (1998–2007)(Gaither Homecoming artist)
- Butch Owens (February 2007–July 2007)(also known for things like the Songfellows Quartet & The Blackwood Brothers)
- Chip Cooper (2007–2010)
- Paul Hyde (2010–2012)
- Joe Lee Armstrong (2012–2016)

Piano

- Ivan "Tiny" Merrill (1946–1954)(Sue Whitfield and Joe Thomas have filled in for him at various points)
- Emory Parker (1954)
- Livy Freeman (1955)(went on to things like Foggy River Boys & Songfellows Quartet)
- Derrell Stewart (1956–2007)
- Joshua Pope (March 2008–July 2008, 2011-2016)

Bass guitar

- Tommy Watwood (1976)
- Barry Miller (around 1977–1983)
- Clarke Beasley (Intermitent 1985-1990, Full Time 1990-1991) (also intermittent vocals)

Drums

- Chet Johnson (1973–?)

Various instruments

- Tim Lovelace (for 9 years)(went on to things like Kingsmen Quartet & the Gaither Homecoming series)

== Glen Allred's personal work ==

Glen Allred and 3 Generations

Glen Allred & 3 Generations is a Southern gospel group. Glen Allred, the former baritone singer for The Florida Boys, is also the baritone singer for The 3 Generations. Randy Allred, the former bass singer for The Dixie Echoes reprises this role. The alto is Cindy Dunn and the soprano is Brandy Allred. Shayne Dunn and Shirley Allred were also featured on the latest album.

Discography:

- I Shall Sing
- Time To Sing
- More Singing Please
