= Les Beasley =

American singer (1928–2018)

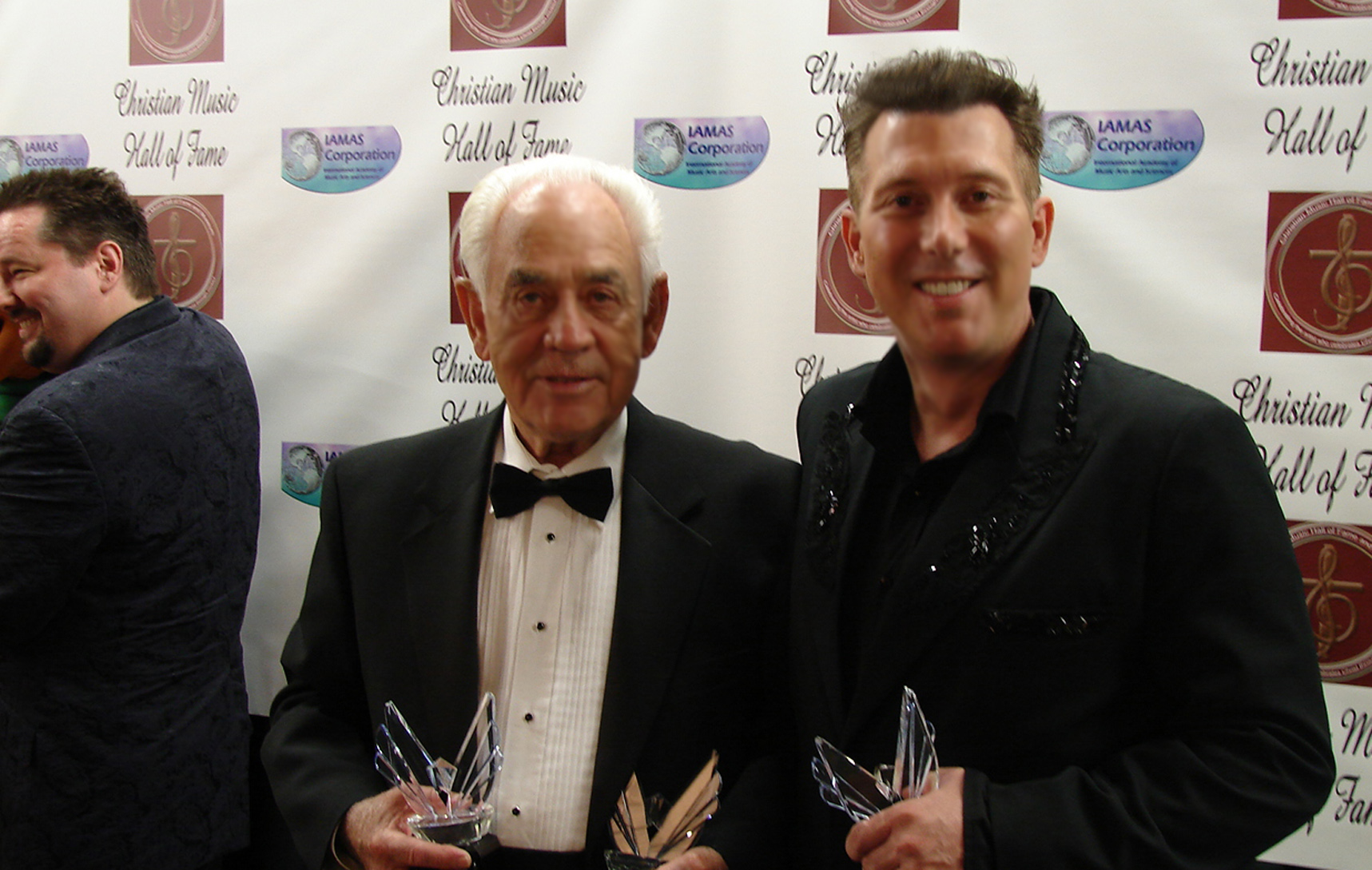
- Beasley with David L. Cook

Background information
- Born: August 16, 1928; Crockett, Texas, U.S.
- Died: November 17, 2018 (aged 90) Pensacola, Florida, U.S.
- Genres: Southern gospel, Christian
- Occupations: Singer, Guitarist, Manager
- Instruments: Vocals, Bass Guitar
- Years active: 1953–2018

Les Beasley (August 16, 1928 – November 17, 2018) was an American Southern Gospel musician. From 1953 to 2007 he was the lead singer, bass guitarist, and manager for the Florida Boys. He was considered to be one of the pioneers of Gospel Music TV.

== Early life ==
Beasley was born to Lester Beasley and Edna Stewart Beasley. His father was a minister, and his mother a homemaker. Beasley started singing at an early age in his father's churches. Growing up, Beasley lived in many places, including Crockett TX, Ripley TN, Mt Vernon TX, Mobeetie TX, Benton AR, Burdette AR, Jena LA, Kentwood LA, and West Helena, AR. Beasley graduated from Louisiana State University.

== Career ==
Beasley started his career singing with a group called the McManus Trio and then in 1953 joined The Gospel Melody Quartet, which eventually was renamed The Florida Boys Quartet. Joined by future Southern Gospel music legends and hall of famers Glen Allred and Darryl Stewart, Beasley was the lead singer and bass guitarist from 1953 to 1999. After developing severe vocal problems, Beasley stepped aside as lead vocalist in 1999 but stayed on as manager of the group as well as bass guitarist. An innovator in the Southern Gospel world, he introduced a newer sound by adding guitars in addition to vocals as he and Glen Allred both sang and played bass and electric guitar, respectively. In the 1960s and 1970s, Beasley co-produced the popular syndicated television program The Gospel Singing Jubilee, which introduced Southern Gospel Music to other areas of the country. He also served as president of the Gospel Music Association in 1970 and 1971, and co-designed the Dove Award statue. Beasley was the owner of Beasley and Barker Publishing Company and also served as a lifetime member and permanent board member of the Gospel Music Association. He served on the board of the National Quartet Convention for many years and was also an accomplished songwriter with such songs as Lead Me To The Altar to his credit. Beasley was inducted into the Gospel Music Hall of Fame in 1989 and the Southern Gospel Museum and Hall of Fame in 1997. Beasley retired from the Florida Boys in 2007 along with Allred and Stewart, their last performance as a group was at the 2007 National Quartet Convention. Upon his retirement Beasley leased the name of the group to Southern Gospel Music promoter Charlie Waller so the group could continue performing with all new members.

== Personal life ==
Beasley was married to his wife Frances for almost 50 years and had 6 children, 12 grandchildren, and 4 great-grandchildren and remained active in gospel music until his death November 17, 2018.

== Achievements ==
- Produced "The Gospel Singing Jubilee", the nationally syndicated television program that aired during the 1960s and 1970s
- President of the Gospel Music Association for two years
- Lifetime member of the Board Of Directors of the Gospel Music Association
- He, Bill Gaither and Herman Harper, as a committee, suggested to the GMA board that an awards program be a part of the annual meeting. The Dove Awards is the result of that suggestion. Beasley named the award.
- President of a Southern Gospel Music Association that later became the Southern Gospel Music Guild
- President of The National Quartet Convention that promotes the National Quartet Convention
- Member of The GMA Hall of Fame
- Member of The Southern Gospel Music Hall of Fame and The Texas Gospel Music Hall of Fame
- Member of the Christian Music Hall of Fame
