= Southern Gospel Music Association =

Trade association

- Type: nonprofit
- Industry: Southern gospel music
- Genre: Christian
- Founder: Glen Payne J. D.Sumner James Blackwood
- Headquarters: Pigeon Forge, Tennessee, United States
- Key people: Raymond Brooks, Eric Blackwood, David Sutton, Eric Bennett, Lisa Fuller, Ron Blackwood Jr., Daniel Justice, Martina Blackwood
- Owner: Southern Gospel Media
- Parent: Southern Gospel Media
- Website: sgma.org

The Southern Gospel Music Association (SGMA) is a non-profit corporation formed as an association of southern gospel music singers, songwriters, fans, and industry workers. Membership is acquired and maintained through payment of annual dues. The SGMA was formed in 1994, and states that its primary goal is "to preserve, protect and promote Southern Gospel Music, its history and heritage".

The Southern Gospel Music Association operates the Southern Gospel Museum and Hall of Fame in Pigeon Forge, a popular Tennessee tourist town, and also hosts the Southern Gospel Music Awards. The Hall of Fame and Museum was opened at the Dollywood theme park in 1999.

Leadership of the SGMA is vested in a 23-member board of directors. The SGMA is responsible for the nomination, selection, and induction into the Southern Gospel Music Hall of Fame.

== History ==
The Gospel Music Association (GMA) was founded in 1964 to promote Gospel music. It was created as an extension of the National Quartet Convention, a convention devoted to Southern gospel that had been operating since 1956. Its founding board included Don Butler, Cecil and James Blackwood, Vestal Goodman, Charlie Lamb, Don Light, and J.D. Sumner, and its first president was Tennessee Ernie Ford. In its early years, it faced competition from the United States Gospel Music Association, a for-profit entity also focused on gospel music.

In the 1970s and 1980s, tension and conflict emerged between Southern gospel and the newer developments of Jesus music and Contemporary Christian music. Southern Gospel conservatives had been resistant to racial integration, and even as they were slowly becoming more receptive to integration, the new developments in Christian music resulted in Southern Gospel becoming increasingly marginalized by music consumers and losing influence in the GMA. Many Southern conservatives, including members of the GMA, also disapproved of rock music and felt that the newer styles of Gospel music being promoted by the GMA indicated that the organization was essentially moving into an alliance with the "enemy". The Southern Gospel industry became disenchanted with the direction that the GMA was heading and a new organization, the Southern Gospel Music Association, was formed by Charles Waller. However, in 1985, this organization was absorbed by the GMA. A new, independent Southern Gospel Music Association was formed in 1995.

== Southern Gospel Museum and Hall of Fame ==
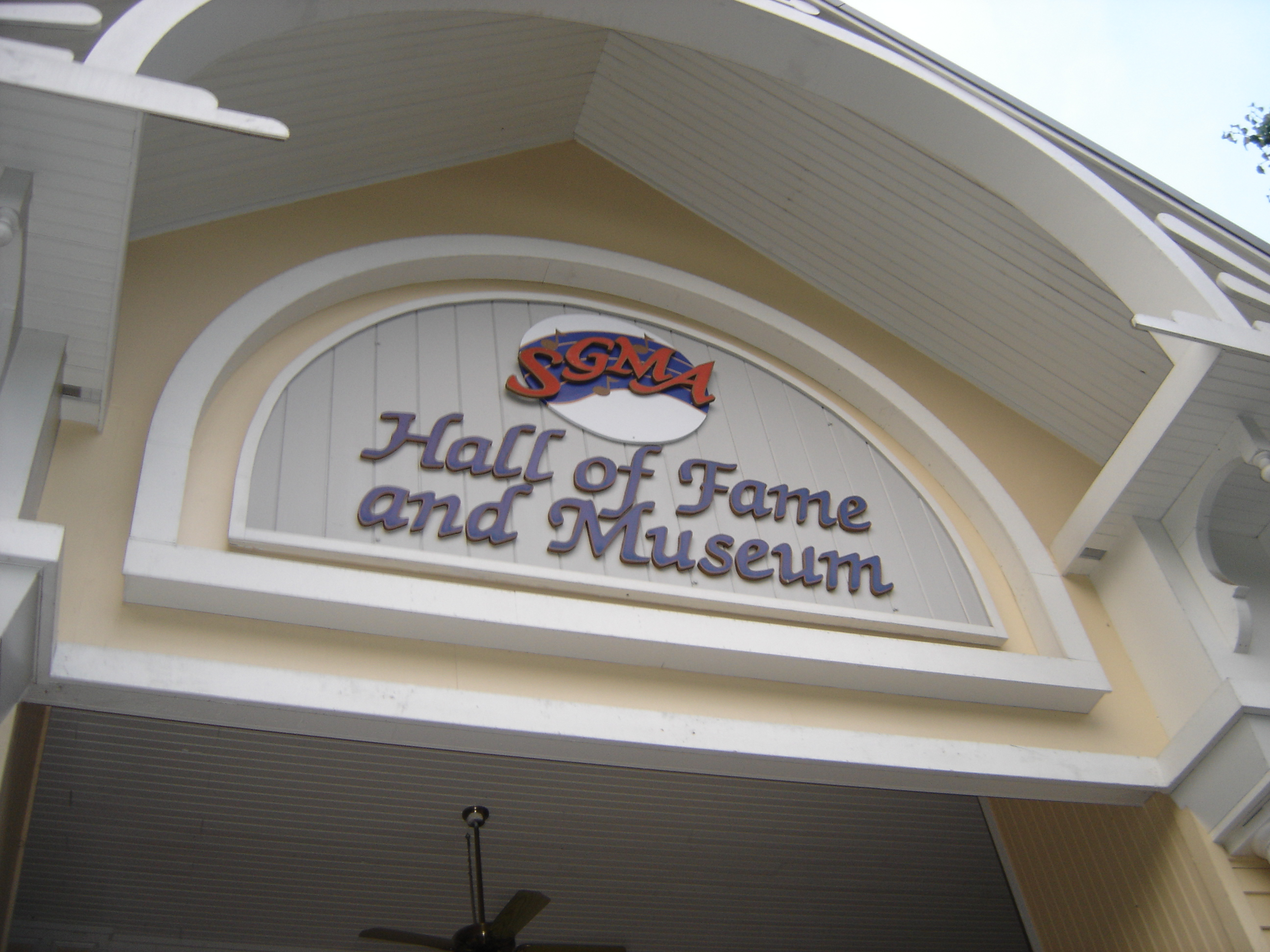
Southern Gospel Museum and Hall of Fame (SGM) at Dollywood

The Southern Gospel Museum and Hall of Fame is a site operated in Pigeon Forge, Tennessee, by the Southern Gospel Music Association, at the Biblical Times Dinner Theater. It was established in 1997. The Hall of Fame is composed of pioneers in the field of Southern gospel music; members are selected by the SGMA annually, and are honored by a descriptive plaque and portrait in the Hall itself. The Museum contains thousands of items of memorabilia and a gift shop. Items on display include a replica of the Blackwood Brothers first bus, interactive video and sound clips, and bronze plaques of Hall of Fame inductees. It has been estimated that over one million people visit the facility annually.

=== Inductees ===
1990s

Inductee	Year	Birth / Death	Notes
Lee Roy Abernathy	1997	1913 - 1993	Musician/Singer/Songwriter; Homeland Harmony Quartet; Rangers Quartet; Happy Two
Wendy Bagwell	1997	1925 - 1996	Singer/Songwriter/Comedian; Founder/Owner/Manager; Wendy Bagwell & the Sunliters (1954-1996)
Clarice “Ma” Baxter	1997	1898 - 1972	Stamps-Baxter Music and Printing Company
J.R. Baxter	1997	1887 - 1960	Stamps-Baxter Music and Printing Company
Les Beasley	1997	1928 - 2018	Singer/Songwriter/Producer; Owner/Manager of The Florida Boys (1959-2007); Co-Producer & Host of The Gospel Singing Jubilee; NQC Board of Directors
James Blackwood	1997	1919 - 2002	Singer/Concert Promoter; Owner/Manager of the Blackwood Brothers Quartet (1948-1981); Masters V; James Blackwood Quartet; Co-Founder of National Quartet Convention
Albert E Brumley	1997	1905 - 1977	Songwriter
DP “Dad” Carter	1997	1889 - 1965	Singer/Musician; Founder/Owner/Manager of the Chuck Wagon Gang (1936-1955)
Denver Crumpler	1997	1912 - 1957	Singer; Statesmen Quartet; Rangers Quartet
John Daniel	1997	1906 - 1961	Singer; Founder/Owner/Manager of John Daniel Quartet (1930s-1961)
Gov. Jimmie Davis	1997	1899 - 2000	Singer/Songwriter/Actor/Politician
Wally Fowler	1997	1917 - 1994	Singer/Songwriter/Concert Promoter/Radio & Television Personality; Founder/Owner/Manager of the Oak Ridge Boys (1945-1959); Founder of the All Nite Sing
Bill Gaither	1997	1936 -	Singer/Songwriter/Publisher/Producer/Concert Promoter; Founder/Owner/Manager Bill Gaither Trio (1959-1990s); Founder/Owner/Manager of Gaither Vocal Band (1981–present); Gaither Homecoming Video & Concert Series
Rusty Goodman	1997	1933 - 1990	Singer/Songwriter/Musician/ Producer; Happy Goodmans; Plainsmen
Connor Hall	1997	1916 - 1992	Singer/Publisher; Owner/Manager of Homeland Harmony Quartet (1948-1989); Founding Member of Tennessee Music & Printing Company
Herman Harper	1997	1938 - 1993	Singer/Producer/Industry Exec; Oak Ridge Boys; Founder of Gospel Music Trust Fund; Founder of The Harper Agency
Jake Hess	1997	1927 - 2004	Singer; Statesmen Quartet; Melody Masters; Masters V; Founder/Manager of The Imperials (1964-1967)
Eva Mae LeFevre	1997	1917 - 2008	Singer/Musician; The LeFevres
Urias LeFevre	1997	1910 - 1979	Singer/Musician; Owner/Manager/Founding member of The LeFevres (1934-1974)
Hovie Lister	1997	1926 - 2001	Musician/Singer/Songwriter/Concert Promoter; Founder/Owner/Manager of the Statesmen Quartet (1948-2001); Homeland Harmony Quartet; The LeFevres; Rangers Quartet; Masters V; Palmetto State Quartet
Mosie Lister	1997	1921 - 2015	Songwriter/Singer/Musician
Marvin Norcross	1997	1929 - 1980	Producer; Founder of Canaan Records
WB Nowlin	1997	1905 - 1994	Concert Promoter
Lloyd Orrell	1997	1907 - 1983	Concert Promoter
O.A. Parris	1997	1897 - 1966	Songwriter/Publisher
Glen Payne	1997	1926 - 1999	Singer; Founder/Owner/Manager of Cathedral Quartet (1963-1999); Stamps Quartet; Weatherfords; NQC Board of Directors
Dottie Rambo	1997	1934 - 2008	Singer/Songwriter; The Rambos
G.T. “Dad” Speer	1997	1891 - 1966	Singer/Songwriter/Teacher; Founder/Owner/Manager of the Speer Family (1921-1963)
Lena “Mom” Speer	1997	1899 - 1967	Singer; Matriarch of the Speer Family (1921-1967)
Brock Speer	1997	1920 - 1999	Singer/Producer/Industry Exec; Owner/Manager of the Speer Family (1966-1998); NQC Board of Directors
Frank Stamps	1997	1896 - 1965	Singer/Publisher; Founder of Stamps Quartet Music Company
V.O. Stamps	1997	1892 - 1940	Singer/Songwriter/Publisher/ Radio Pioneer; Founder of Stamps-Baxter Music & Printing Company
J.D. Sumner	1997	1924 - 1998	Singer/Songwriter/Concert Promoter/Innovator; Sunshine Boys; Blackwood Brothers; Masters V; Owner/Manager of the Stamps Quartet (1965-1998); Founding Director of the National Quartet Convention; Customized first entertainment coach
James D Vaughan	1997	1864 - 1941	Innovator/Publisher/Songwriter/Teacher/Radio Pioneer; Founder of Southern Gospel Music in 1910; Founder of the James D Vaughan Music Publishing Company, The Vaughan Quartet, and Vaughan School of Music; Founder of first southern radio station WOAN
Kieffer Vaughan	1997	1893 - 1969	Singer/Songwriter/Teacher/Publisher; Manager of Vaughan Music Printing Company 1941-1960s; Manager of Vaughan Quartet
“Big” Jim Waits	1997	1899 - 1974	Singer; Early “star” of gospel music; Vaughan Quartet; Stamps Quartet; John Daniel Quartet; The LeFevres; Homeland Harmony Quartet; The Revelaires; Rebels Quartet
James S. “Big Chief” Wetherington	1997	1922 - 1973	Singer/Songwriter; Statesmen Quartet; Melody Masters
J.G. Whitfield	1997	1915 - 2006	Singer/Producer/Concert Promoter/Radio & TV Personality; Founder/Owner/Manager of The Florida Boys (1947-1959); Founder/Owner/Manager of The Dixie Echoes (1960-1967); Founder of Singing News Magazine & Gospel Singing Jubilee
Eldridge Fox	1998	1936 - 2002	Singer/Musician/Songwriter/Publisher/Producer; Owner/Manager of Kingsmen (1971-2001); NQC Board of Directors
Ben Speer	1998	1930 - 2017	Singer/Musician/Publisher/Producer; Speer Family; Homeland Quartet
George Younce	1998	1930 - 2005	Singer/Songwriter; Cathedral Quartet; Blue Ridge Quartet; Weatherfords
Smitty Gatlin	1999	1935 - 1972	Singer/Songwriter; Owner/Manager of the Oak Ridge Boys (1957-1966); Founder/Owner/Manager of the Smitty Gatlin Trio (1966-1972)
Rex Nelon	1999	1932 - 2000	Singer/Songwriter/Publisher; Founder/Owner/Manager of The Nelons (1977-1998); The LeFevres; Homeland Harmony Quartet; NQC Board of Directors
Adger M Pace	1999	1882 - 1959	Singer/Songwriter/Publisher/Teacher; Vaughan Radio Quartet
Rosie Rozell	1999	1928 - 1995	Singer/Songwriter; Statesmen Quartet; Tulsa Trumpeteers; Rosie Rozell & the Searchers; Masters V
W.B. Walbert	1999	1886 - 1959	Singer/Musician/Songwriter/Publisher; James D Vaughan Music Company

2000s

Inductee	Year	Birth / Death	Notes
E.M. Bartlett	2000	1884 - 1941	Songwriter/Teacher/Publisher
James Roy “Pop” Lewis	2000	1905 - 2004	Singer/Musician/Songwriter; Owner/Founder/Manager of The Lewis Family (1950-1980s)
Doy Ott	2000	1919 - 1986	Singer/Musician/Songwriter; Statesmen Quartet; Stamps-Baxter Melody Boys; Rangers Quartet; Homeland Harmony Quartet
A.J. Showalter	2000	1858 - 1924	Songwriter/Teacher/Publisher
Earl Weatherford	2000	1922 - 1992	Singer/Musician; Founder/Owner/Manager of The Weatherfords (1947-1992)
Lily Fern Weatherford	2000	1928 -	Singer; The Weatherfords
Glen Allred	2001	1934 - 2021	Singer/Songwriter/Musician; Florida Boys; Oak Ridge Quartet
Cleavant Derricks	2001	1910 - 1977	Songwriter/Singer/Evangelist
Vep Ellis	2001	1917 - 1988	Songwriter/Singer/Musician/ Evangelist
Naomi Sego Reader	2001	1931 - 2017	Singer; Sego Brothers & Naomi
Dale Shelnut	2001	1935 - 1983	Singer; Owner/Manager of The Dixie Echoes (1972-1983); Rhythm Masters Quartet; Tennesseans Quartet
Ira Stanphill	2001	1914 - 1993	Singer/Songwriter/Evangelist
Buford Abner	2002	1917 - 2011	Singer/Songwriter; Swanee River Boys
RW Blackwood	2002	1921 - 1954	Singer; Blackwood Brothers Quartet
Jerry Goff	2002	1935 - 2019	Singer/Songwriter/Musician/ Evangelist/Concert Promoter; Jerry & the Singing Goffs; Thrasher Brothers; NQC Board of Directors
Vestal Goodman	2002	1929 - 2003	Singer; Happy Goodman Family
Alphus LeFevre	2002	1912 - 1988	Singer/Songwriter/Musician; Founding member of The LeFevres
William M. Ramsey	2002	1872 - 1939	Singer/Songwriter/Teacher
R.E. Winsett	2002	1876 - 1952	Songwriter/Publisher/Teacher
Dwight Brock	2003	1907 - 1988	Musician/Songwriter/Teacher/ Publisher; Stamps Quartet; Vaughan Radio Quartet
Martin Cook	2003	1936 - 2022	Musician; Founder/Owner/Manager of The Inspirations (1964-2017)
Howard Goodman	2003	1921 - 2002	Singer/Songwriter/Musician/ Evangelist; Founder/Owner/Manager of the Happy Goodman Family
J.A. McClung	2003	1891 - 1942	Singer/Songwriter/ Publisher/Teacher
Otis McCoy	2003	1897 - 1995	Singer/Songwriter/Publisher/ Teacher; Vaughan Radio Quartet; Vaughan Saxophone Quartet; Homeland Harmony Quartet; Founding Director of Tennessee Music & Printing Company
Fred C. Maples	2003	1910 - 1987	Singer; Founder/Owner/Manager of the Harmoneers Quartet (1943-1957); Homeland Harmony Quartet; Vaughan Victory Quartet
J. Bazzel Mull	2003	1914 - 2006	Radio & Television Personality; Concert Promoter
Homer Rodeheaver	2003	1880 - 1955	Singer/Songwriter/Evangelist/ Publisher/Radio Personality
Marion Snider	2003	1914 - 2010	Musician/Songwriter/Singer; Stamps Quartet; Blackwood Brothers Quartet; Rangers Quartet; Imperial Quartet
Bobby Strickland	2003	1920 - 1953	Singer; Founder/Owner/Manager of the Crusaders Quartet; Statesmen Quartet; Harmoneers Quartet; Sand Mountain Quartet
“Big” Jim Hamill	2004	1934 - 2007	Singer/Songwriter/Producer; Kingsmen Quartet (1971-1996); Rebels Quartet; Oak Ridge Boys; Foggy River Boys; Blue Ridge Quartet; Weatherfords
Kenny Hinson	2004	1953 - 1995	Singer/Songwriter; The Hinsons
Arnold Hyles	2004	1906 - 1979	Singer; Rangers Quartet
Lillian Little Soldier Klaudt	2004	1906 - 2001	Singer; Klaudt Indian Family
Harvey “Pop” Lester	2004	1902 - 1982	Singer/Radio & Television Personality/Concert Promoter; The Lesters
Ed O’Neal	2004	1936 -	Singer/Songwriter; Owner & Manager of the Dixie Melody Boys (1965-2023)
London Parris	2004	1931 - 1992	Singer; Rebels Quartet; Blackwood Brothers Quartet; Apostles; Senators
Derrell Stewart	2004	1934 - 2021	Musician/Comedian; The Florida Boys
B.C. Unseld	2004	1843 - 1923	Teacher/Publisher
Charles Vaughan	2004	1875 - 1965	Singer/Songwriter/Publisher/ Politician; Vaughan Quartet
James D Walbert	2004	1918 - 2009	Musician/Songwriter/Teacher; Vaughan Quartet
Robert S Arnold	2005	1905 - 2003	Singer/Songwriter/Publisher/ Teacher; National Quartet
Anna Gordon Davis	2005	1917 - 2004	Singer; Chuck Wagon Gang
Elmo Fagg	2005	1919 - 1981	Singer/Songwriter/Producer; Owner/Manager of The Blue Ridge Quartet (1949-1969)
Gloria Gaither	2005	1942 -	Singer/Songwriter/Poet/Publisher/ Speaker; The Bill Gaither Trio; Gaither Homecoming Series
Rosa Nell Speer Powell	2005	1922 - 2017	Singer/Musician/Teacher; Speer Family
Joe Roper	2005	1919 - 1990	Musician/Songwriter/Publisher/ Teacher/Comedian; Melody Boys Quartet; Stamps Quartet; Prophets; Blackwood Brothers Quartet
Bill Shaw	2005	1924 - 2018	Singer/Songwriter; Blackwood Brothers Quartet
Erman Slater	2005	1903 - 1951	Singer; Rangers Quartet; Harmoneers Quartet; Sand Mountain Quartet; Stamps Dixie Four; Lone Star Quartet
Jack Toney	2005	1933 - 2004	Singer/Songwriter/Musician; Statesmen Quartet; JD Sumner & the Stamps; Southmen; Dixie Echoes
Eddie Wallace	2005	1924 - 2014	Singer/Musician/Comedian; Sunshine Boys
Wallace “Happy” Edwards	2006	1926 - 2001	Singer/Comedian; Harmoneers Quartet
Vernon Hyles	2006	1910 - 1972	Singer/Musician; Founder/Owner/Manager of The Rangers Quartet
Bob Jones Sr.	2006	1914 - 2007	Singer; Founder/Owner/Manager of the Songfellows Quartet; Stamps Quartet
Rose Carter Karnes	2006	1914 - 1997	Singer; Chuck Wagon Gang
Charles Key	2006	1926 - 2010	Musician; Harmoneers Quartet
Jack Pittman	2006	1926 - 2013	Singer/Concert Promoter; Owner/Manager of Palmetto State Quartet
Henry Slaughter	2006	1927 - 2020	Musician/Singer/Songwriter/ Producer; Weatherfords; Imperials; Henry & Hazel; Stamps Ozark Quartet
Mary Tom Speer Reid	2006	1925 - 2014	Singer/Musician; Speer Family
Maurice Templeton	2006	1932 -	Singer/Industry Executive
Wally Varner	2006	1926 - 2004	Musician/Songwriter; Blackwood Brothers Quartet; Homeland Harmony Quartet
Gerald Williams	2006	1933 -	Singer/Songwriter; Melody Boys Quartet; Plainsmen; Rosie Rozell & the Searchers
Roger Bennett	2007	1959 - 2007	Musician/Singer/Songwriter; Cathedral Quartet; Legacy Five
Anthony Burger	2007	1961 - 2006	Musician; Kingsmen Quartet; Gaither Homecoming Series
Joel Hemphill	2007	1939 -	Singer/Songwriter/Musician; Founder/Owner/Manager of The Hemphills
Lou Wills Hildreth	2007	1928 - 2019	Singer/Songwriter/Radio & TV Personality/Concert Promoter/Publisher/Industry Executive; The Wills Family
Jimmy Jones	2007	1921 - 2006	Singer/Songwriter/Poet; Rangers Quartet; Deep South Quartet; The LeFevres
David Reece	2007	1928 - 1999	Singer/Songwriter/Comedian; Rangers Quartet; Imperial Quartet; Harvesters Quartet; Rangers Trio
James Sego	2007	1927 - 1979	Singer/Songwriter; Founder/Owner/Manager of Sego Brothers & Naomi
Archie Watkins	2007	1949 -	Singer; Owner/Manager of the Inspirations (2017–present)
Fred Daniel	2008	1924 - 2007	Singer; Sunshine Boys; Blue Ridge Quartet
Polly Grimes	2008	1931 - 2019	Concert Promoter
Herschel Lester	2008	1927 - 2004	Singer/Musician/Concert Promoter/Teacher/Television Personality; The Lesters
Squire Parsons	2008	1948 -	Singer/Songwriter/Musician; Kingsmen; Squire Parsons & Redeemed; Soloist
Luther G Presley	2008	1887 - 1974	Songwriter/Publisher/Teacher
Ray Dean Reese	2008	1939 -	Singer; Owner & Manager of The Kingsmen 2001–Present
Neil Enloe	2009	1938 -	Singer/Songwriter/Musician; The Couriers
Ed Hill	2009	1935 - 2020	Singer; Founder/Owner/Manager of The Prophets Quartet (1958-1973); JD Sumner & the Stamps; Statesmen Quartet; Songfellows
Jennings Harold Lane	2009	1929 - 2011	Singer/Songwriter/Musician/ Arranger/Producer; Speer Family; Founding member of The Gospel Harmony Boys; Homeland Harmony Quartet
Don Light	2009	1937 - 2014	Industry Executive; Founder of Don Light Talent
Bill Lyles	2009	1920 - 1954	Singer; Blackwood Brothers Quartet
Elizabeth “Lady” Mull	2009	1926 - 2012	Radio & Television Personality; Concert Promoter
Billy Todd	2009	1929 - 2008	Singer; The Florida Boys; Dixie Echoes
Charlie Waller	2009	1948 -	Concert Promoter/Singer/ Producer; The Florida Boys

2010s

Inductee	Year	Birth / Death	Notes
Danny Gaither	2010	1938 - 2001	Singer; Bill Gaither Trio; Golden Keys Quartet
Little Jan Buckner Goff	2010	1945 -	Singer/Songwriter/Musician; Wendy Bagwell & the Sunliters
Sam Goodman	2010	1931 - 1991	Singer/Evangelist/Comedian; Happy Goodman Family
Bill Hefner	2010	1930 - 2009	Singer/Concert Promoter/Comedian; Founding member/Owner/Manager of the Harvesters Quartet (1954-1967)
Connie Hopper	2010	1940 -	Singer/Writer; The Hoppers
Arthur Smith	2010	1921 - 2014	Singer/Songwriter/Musician/ Radio & Television Personality; Arthur Smith & the Crossroads Quartet
Doris Akers	2011	1923 - 1995	Singer/Songwriter/Publisher/ Musician; Simmons Akers Singers; Sallie Martin Singers; Soloist
Doyle Blackwood	2011	1911 - 1974	Singer/Musician; Founding member of the Blackwood Brothers Quartet (1934-1950); Homeland Harmony Quartet; Doyle Blackwood & the Memphians
Bob Brumley	2011	1937 - 2020	Concert Promoter/Publisher
Roy Carter	2011	1926 - 1998	Singer/Songwriter; Manager of the Chuck Wagon Gang (1955-1995)
Kenny Gates	2011	1930 -	Musician/Singer/Songwriter; Blue Ridge Quartet
Jerry Kirksey	2011	1940 - 2023	Founding editor of Singing News Magazine; Concert Promoter; Industry Executive
Opal “Mom” Lester	2011	1906 - 1999	Singer/Musician/Teacher/Concert Promoter/Television Personality; The Lesters
Willie Wynn	2011	1937 -	Singer; Oak Ridge Boys; Willie Wynn & the Tennesseans; Sweetwater
Charlie Burke	2012	1936 - 2011	Singer/Industry Executive; Pine Ridge Boys; Owner & Manager of the Singing Americans (1980-1994)
Stuart Hamblen	2012	1908 - 1989	Singer/Songwriter; Radio & Television Personality; Actor
Jim Hill	2012	1930 - 2018	Singer/Songwriter; Stamps Quartet; Golden Keys Quartet; Statesmen Quartet
Geraldine Morrison	2012	1935 - 2005	Singer; Wendy Bagwell & the Sunliters
Buck Rambo	2012	1931 - 2016	Singer/Publisher/Evangelist; Manager of The Rambos
Ace Richman	2012	1916 - 1999	Singer; Founder/Owner/Manager of The Sunshine Boys (1939-1970)
John T Benson Jr.	2013	1904 - 1966	Publisher/Industry Executive; President & CEO of Benson Publishing Company; Founder of Heart Warming & Impact Records
Polly Lewis Copsey	2013	1937 - 2018	Singer; The Lewis Family
Thomas A Dorsey	2013	1899 - 1993	Singer/Songwriter/Evangelist
Little Roy Lewis	2013	1942 -	Singer/Musician/Comedian; The Lewis Family; Little Roy & Lizzy
Duane Nicholson	2013	1936 -	Singer; The Couriers
Tim Riley	2013	1945 -	Singer; Owner/Manager of Gold City (1980-2005, 2010-2015); Dixie Echoes; Southmen
Colbert Croft	2014	1941 - 2014	Songwriter/Evangelist
Eddie Crook	2014	1941 -	Musician/Songwriter/Producer/ Publisher; Happy Goodman Family; Sego Brothers & Naomi; Plainsmen; Tennesseans; Prophets Quartet; Southmen
Fannie Crosby	2014	1820 - 1915	Songwriter/Poet
Cat Freeman	2014	1922 - 1989	Singer/Teacher/Comedian; Statesmen Quartet; Blackwood Brothers; Oak Ridge Quartet; Jubilee Quartet
Paul Heil	2014	1947 - 2020	Radio Personality/Preacher; Founder/Host of The Gospel Greats radio show (1980-2020)
Claude Hopper	2014	1937 -	Singer/Publisher/Industry Exec/ NQC Board of Directors
Warren Roberts	2014	1920 - 2011	Radio & Television Personality/ Concert Promoter
Faye Speer	2014	1928 - 2015	Singer; Speer Family
“Big” Lew Garrison	2015	1933 - 1994	Singer/Comedian; Prophets Quartet
Ed Sprouse	2015	1923 - 2014	Singer; Blue Ridge Quartet
Peg McKamey Bean	2016	1946 - 2023	Singer; The McKameys
Lari Goss	2016	1945 - 2015	Singer/Songwriter/Musician/ Producer; The Goss Brothers
Ronny Hinson	2016	1946 -	Singer/Songwriter/Musician/ Evangelist; Owner & Manager of The Hinsons (1967-1994); Soloist
Carroll McGruder	2016	1946 - 2015	Singer/Songwriter/Evangelist; Founder/Owner/Manager of The McGruders (1976-2010)
Troy Burns	2017	1952 -	Singer/Musician; The Inspirations; Troy Burns Family
Tony Greene	2017	1968 - 2010	Singer/Musician/Concert Promoter/Comedian; The Greenes
LaBreeska Hemphill	2017	1940 - 2015	Singer; The Hemphills
Randy Shelnut	2017	1955 -	Singer/Musician/Songwriter/ Producer; Owner/Manager of The Dixie Echoes (1983–present)
Ann Downing	2018	1945 -	Singer/Songwriter/Speaker; Speer Family; Founding member of The Downings (1969-1979); Soloist
Tracy Stuffle	2018	1966 - 2018	Singer; Manager of The Perrys (1995-2013)
Mark Trammell	2018	1959 -	Singer/Songwriter/Musician; Cathedrals; Kingsmen; Gold City; Founding member of Greater Vision; Founder/Owner/Manager of Mark Trammell Quartet
Norman Wilson	2018	1944 - 2014	Singer/Musician; Primitive Quartet
Ruben Bean	2019	1941 -	Singer; Owner/Manager of The McKameys (1957-2019)
Ernie Phillips	2019	1950 - 2018	Singer; The Kingsmen; Squire Parsons & Redeemed; Land of the Sky Boys; Landmark Quartet
Jackie Wilburn	2019	1937 - 2011	Singer/Evangelist; Founder/Owner/Manager of The Wilburns (1980-2005)
Gerald Wolfe	2019	1963 -	Singer/Musician/Producer/Industry Executive; Cathedral Quartet; Founder/Owner/Manager of Greater Vision (1990–present); NQC Board of Directors; Gospel Music Hymn Sing Foundation

2020s

Inductee	Year	Birth / Death	Notes
Meurice LeFevre	2020	1937 - 2019	Singer/Musician/Producer/Industry Executive; Founder of Sing Records & LeFevre-Sing Studios
Dottie Leonard Miller	2020	1945 -	Industry Executive/Publisher; Founder of Daywind Records, Daywind Music Group, and New Day Christian Distributors
Melvin Klaudt	2020	1933 -	Singer/Television Personality; Klaudt Indian Family; Founder of Klaudt Memorial Foundation
Dianne Wilkinson	2020	1944 - 2021	Songwriter
Jack Clark	2021	1934 -	Musician/Songwriter/Publisher/ Producer/Teacher; Homeland Harmony Quartet; Harvesters Quartet; Landmark Quartet
Karen Peck Gooch	2021	1960 -	Singer/Songwriter/Industry Executive; Founder/Owner/Manager of Karen Peck & New River (1991–present); Uncle Alf & the LeFevres; The Nelons
Marlin Taylor	2021	1935 -	Radio Personality; Founder of SiriusXM Enlighten
Aaron Wilburn	2021	1950 - 2020	Singer/Songwriter/Musician/ Comedian; Happy Goodman Family; Soloist
Rodney Griffin	2022	1966 -	Singer/Songwriter/Publisher/ Musician; Greater Vision; Dixie Melody Boys; Second Half Quartet
Arthur Rice	2022	1962 -	Singer/Producer/Musician; Kingdom Heirs; Kingsmen; Squire Parsons & Redeemed
Kyla Rowland	2022	1945 - 2022	Singer/Songwriter/Publisher/ Speaker; The Rowlands
Chris White	2022		Producer/Publisher/Industry Executive; Founder of Sonlite Records, Crossroads Entertainment, and Chris White Music
Sue Dodge	2023	1949 -	Singer/Evangelist/Speaker/ Musician; Speer Family; The Downings; Soloist
Danny Funderburk	2023	1954 -	Singer; Cathedral Quartet; Singing Americans; Perfect Heart; Soloist
Norman Holland	2023	1959 - 2014	Producer/Industry Executive; Riversong Records; Chapel Records; Daywind Records
Reagan Riddle	2023	1946 -	Singer/Songwriter/Concert Promoter; Founding member/Owner/Manager of The Primitive Quartet (1973-2023)
Jeff Stice	2024	1960 - 2021	Musician; Blackwood Brothers; Nelons; Perfect Heart; Kingdom Heirs; Triumphant Quartet; Soloist
Mike Holcomb	2024	1954 -	Singer/Evangelist; The Inspirations; The Old Time Preachers Quartet
Kelly Nelon Clark	2024	1959 - 2024	Singer; Lefevres; Nelons
Herb Henry	2024		Singer/Promoter;

=== James D. Vaughan Impact Award recipients ===
- 1999 Bill Gaither
- 2000 The Cathedrals
- 2001 James Blackwood
- 2002 J. G. Whitfield
- 2003 Les Beasley
- 2004 Paul Heil
- 2005 Mosie Lister
- 2006 Bob Brumley
- 2007 Eva Mae LeFevre
- 2008 Lari Goss
- 2009 Barbara Mandrell
- 2010 Dolly Parton
- 2011 The Statler Brothers
- 2012 The Oak Ridge Boys
- 2013 Louise Mandrell

=== Vaughan Templeton Lifetime Achievement Award recipients ===
- 2022 Maurice Templeton

=== Gallery ===
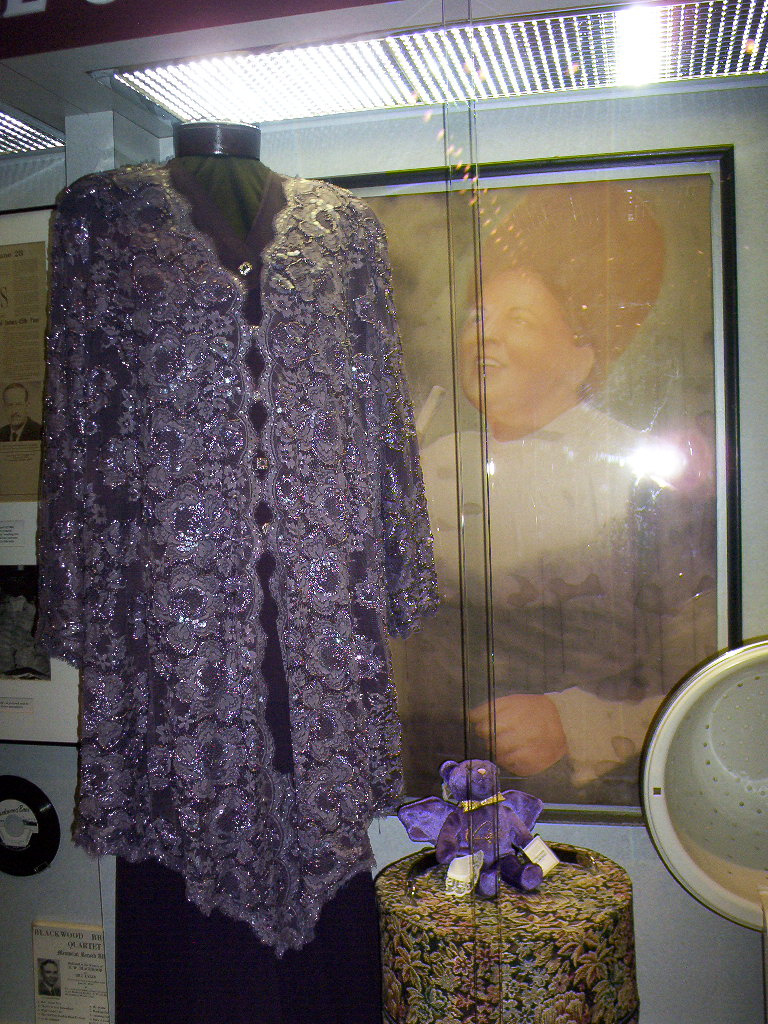
Dress belonging to the late Vestal Goodman of the Happy Goodman Family

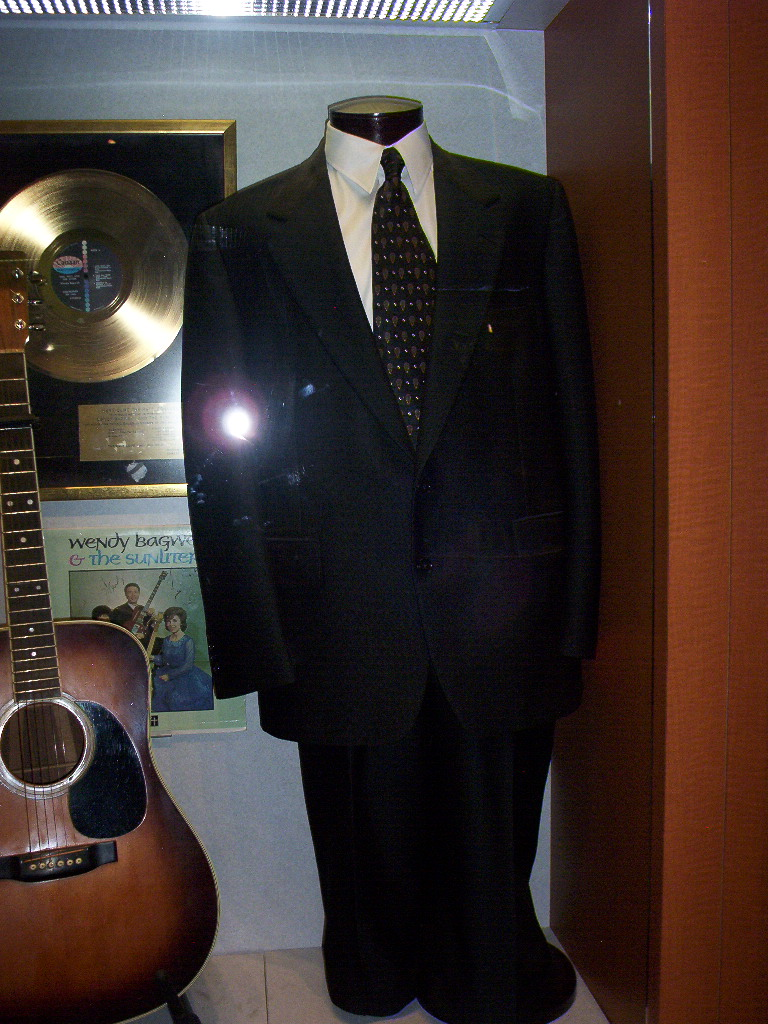
Suit belonging to the late Wendy Bagwell of Wendy Bagwell and the Sunliters

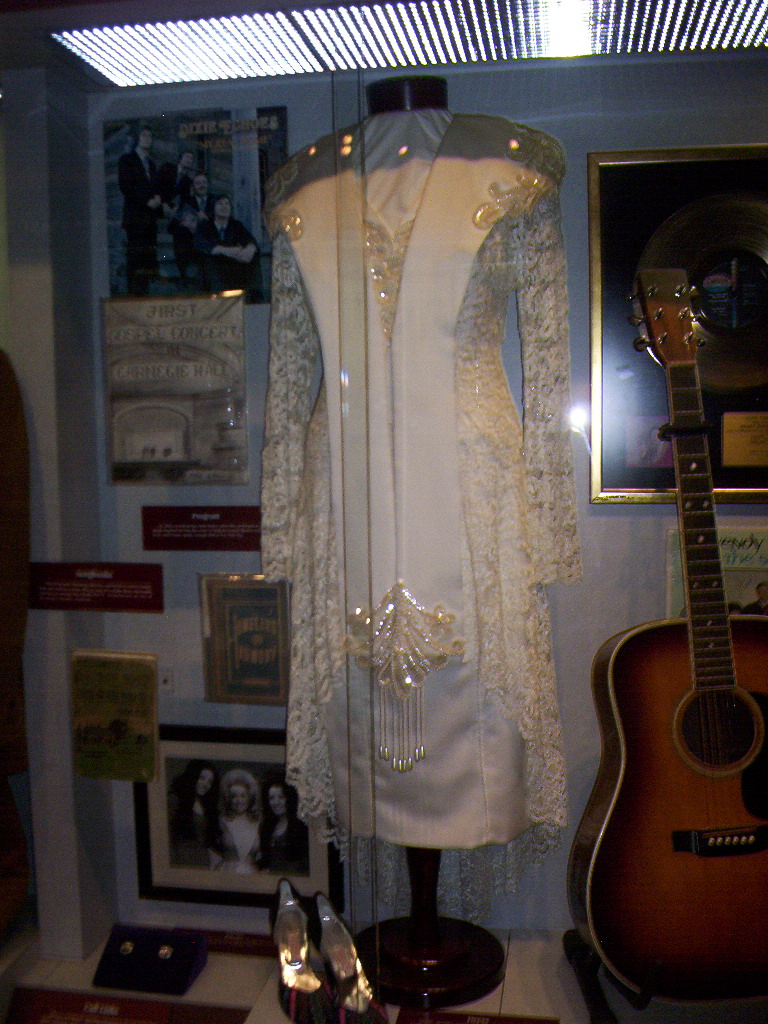
Dress belonging to Dottie Rambo

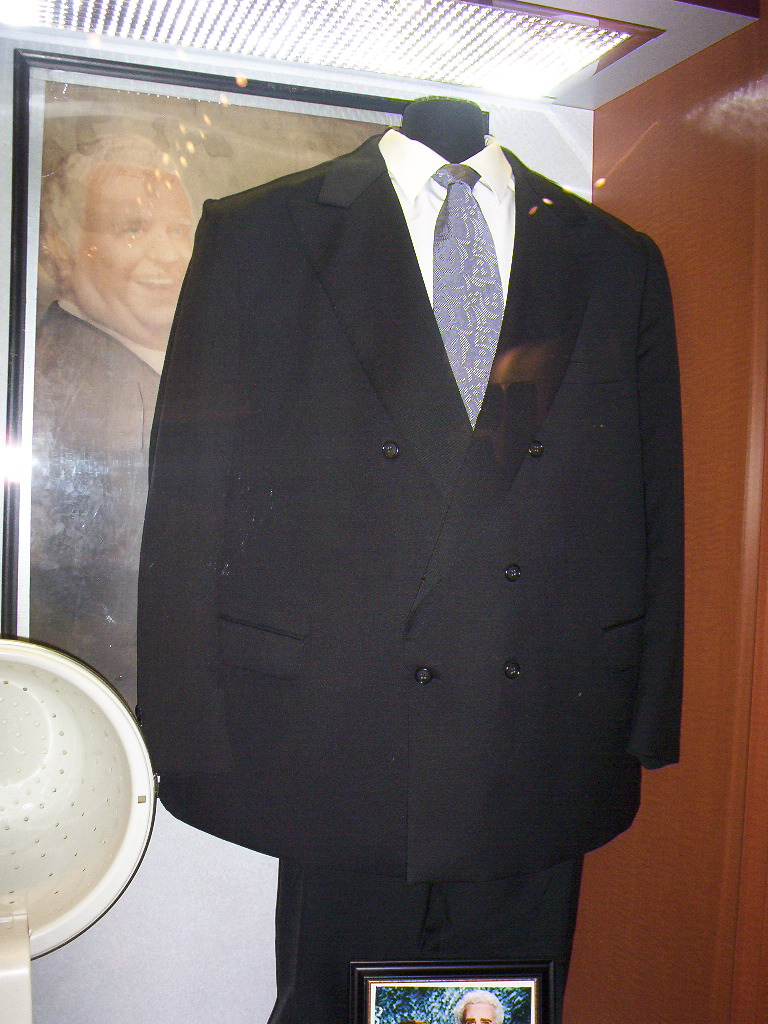
Suit belonging to the late Howard Goodman of the Happy Goodman Family

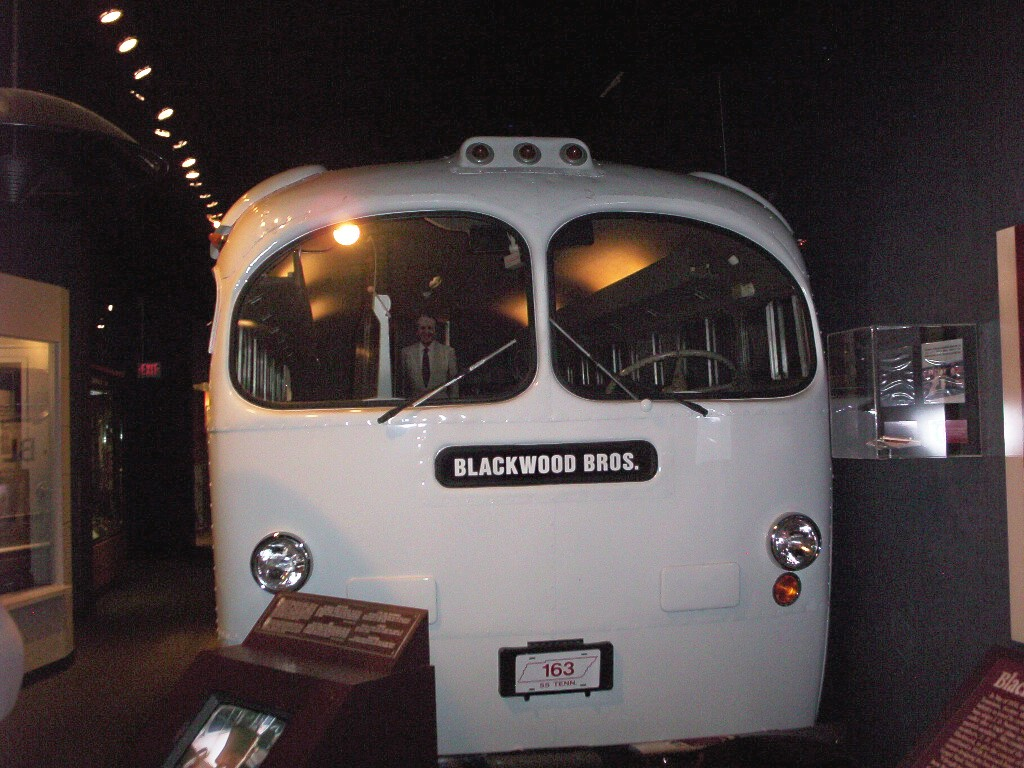
Replica of Blackwood Brothers original bus
