= The Kingsmen Quartet =

US Gospel musical quartet

The Kingsmen
- Also known as: Carolina Boys (2001–04)
- Origin: Asheville, North Carolina
- Genres: Southern gospel
- Years active: 1956–present
- Labels: Stars Records; Piedmont Records; Skylite Records; Mark V Records; QCA Records; Chime Records; Kingsmen Colonial Records; Heavy Weight Records; Supreme Records; Canaan Records; Heart Warming Records; Riversong Records; Horizon Records
- Members: Ray Dean Reese; Alan Kendall; Brandon Reese; Harold Reed; Josh Davis; Brady Jones
- Website: kingsmenquartet.com

The Kingsmen Quartet (better known as The Kingsmen) is an American Southern gospel vocal quartet based out of Asheville, North Carolina.

== Musical career ==
Many singers of Southern Gospel including Jim Hamill, Squire Parsons, Anthony Burger, Mark Trammell, Tim Surrett, and others have been members of The Kingsmen. Compared to the more polished and choreographed quartets before them, The Kingsmen emphasized exuberant gospel energy, especially beginning in the 1970s.

They have had over 75 Top Ten radio hits, more than any other southern gospel music artist, and twenty have gone to the #1 spot, more than any male quartet in history.

== Discography ==
- 1956 Single: If Everybody Prays/This World’s Gonna Bow to the King of Kings
- 1959 EP: House of Gold/Till I Found God/New Jerusalem/This is a Mean World
- 1960 What Love
- 1961 New Jerusalem
- 1962 Closer to Thee
- 1963 That Kingsmen Sound
- 1964 From the Land of the Sky
- 1965 A Visit with the Kingsmen
- 1966 Carolina's Favorite Quartet
- 1966 Songs and Spirituals
- 1967 Sing Out!
- 1968 Kingsmen Kountry
- 1968 Daddy Sang Bass
- 1968 Crown Him King
- 1969 Try a Little Kindness
- 1969 Standing Room Only
- 1970 The Kingsmen
- 1971 Then and Now
- 1971 Suddenly There's a Valley
- 1971 America's Favorite Hymns
- 1971 Presented by Colonial Mobile Homes
- 1972 May Day
- 1972 Turn Your Radio On
- 1972 It's Time to Ring the Bell
- 1972 Johnny Parrack Out Front
- 1972 Hymn Time in the Country
- 1973 High and Low: Johnny Parrack and Ray Dean Reese
- 1973 Sing a Lot of Gospel
- 1973 Reverend Everett Beverly and Anna Laura
- 1973 Just Plain Singin'
- 1973 Just As the Sun Went Down (same album as above)
- 1973 Big and Live
- 1974 1686 lbs. of Gospel
- 1975 Jubiliation
- 1975 The Old and the New: Jim Hamill and Squire Parsons
- 1975 24 Carat Gospel
- 1976 It Made News In Heaven
- 1976 Just In Time
- 1976 Golden Gospel
- 1977 Just a Little Closer Home
- 1977 Chattanooga Live
- 1978 The Upper Window
- 1979 From Out of the Past
- 1980 Ring the Bells of Freedom
- 1981 Live...Naturally
- 1982 Your Ride Is on the Way
- 1982 With Grady Nutt
- 1983 Live from the University of Alabama
- 1984 Kingsmen Silver (compilation album with two original featuring Garry Sheppard)
- 1984 The Game of Life
- 1985 Better in Person
- 1986 Stand Up at Opryland USA
- 1987 Mississippi Live
- 1988 Anchors Aweigh
- 1989 The Judgement (released on cd as "The Kingsmen")
- 1990 Live in Dayton
- 1991 Wish You Were Here
- 1992 Singin' in the Sun Live
- 1992 Walking with Jesus
- 1992 Singing News Hits
- 1992 Living by Faith
- 1993 27 Great Gospel Songs
- 1993 New Life
- 1993 Kingsmen Band
- 1994 Ridin' High
- 1994 Live from the Alabama Theatre
- 1994 A Kingsmen Christmas
- 1994 30 Great Gospel Songs
- 1995 Georgia Live
- 1996 40th Anniversary Reunion: Perfecting the Crown
- 1996 Beyond the Clouds
- 1997 You're Not Alone
- 1997 Southern Classics Volume 1
- 1997 Kingsmen Standards Volume 1
- 1998 The Old Time Way
- 1998 Kingsmen Standards Volume 2
- 1999 Southern Classics Volume 2
- 1999 Shelter
- 1999 Not Quite as Big, But Just as Live
- 2000 Proven Time and Again
- 2001 I Will
- 2001 Honoring the Heritage 1 (as Carolina Boys)
- 2002 Good News! (as Carolina Boys)
- 2003 Ready (as Carolina Boys)
- 2004 Born Again
- 2005 My Past Is Past
- 2006 Good, Good God
- 2007 I'll Not Turn Back-Live
- 2007 Honoring the Heritage 2 - Live
- 2008 When God Ran
- 2009 Missing People
- 2010 Honoring the Heritage 3
- 2010 Live Performances from the National Quartet Convention
- 2011 Grace Says
- 2012 Once Again
- 2013 Front Row Live
- 2014 Battle Cry
- 2016 Classic Live Performances
- 2017 They Don't Know
- 2019 Victory Shout
- 2020 40th Anniversary Reunion: Live, Extended, Remixed, Remastered
- 2021 More to the Story
- 2022 ‘Tis the Reason
- 2023 Decades, Volumes 1 & 2
- 2024 Unstoppable God
- 2025 Decades, Volumes 3 & 4
- 2026 Still Jesus: A 70th Anniversary Celebration

== Awards ==
GMA Dove Awards

- Album of the Year – Big and Live (1974)
- Album of the Year – Chattanooga Live (1978)
- Southern Gospel Album of the Year – From Out of the Past (1980)

Singing News Fan Awards

- Favorite Group (1980, 1985)
- Favorite Traditional Male Quartet (1981)
- Favorite Horizon Group (2002, as Carolina Boys)
- Favorite Lead: Jim Hamill (1974, 1975, 1981, 1982, 1983, 1985)
- Favorite Male Singer: Jim Hamill (1981, 1984, 1985)
- Favorite Tenor: Johnny Parrack (1976), Ernie Phillips (1980, 1981)
- Favorite Bass: Ray Dean Reese (1979, 1985)
- Favorite Baritone: Wayne Maynard (1981), Parker Jonathan (1992, 1993)
- Favorite Band (1978, 1981 to 1984, 1986 to 1997)
- Favorite Musician: Anthony Burger (1980 to 1989)
- Favorite Musician (non-pianist): Tim Surrett (2004, 2005)
- Favorite Horizon Individual: Bryan Hutson (1997)
- Song of the Year: "Sweet Beulah Land" (1981), "Wish You Were Here" (1992)
- Album of the Year: Wish You Were Here (1992)

Other

- BMI Radio Airplay Award, “Oh Yes I Am” (2016)
- BMI Radio Airplay Award, “Battle Cry” (2017)
- Gospel Music Hall of Fame (Inducted in 2000)
- Christian Music Hall of Fame (inducted in 2007)
- Southern Gospel Hall of Fame
  - Eldridge Fox, inducted in 1998
  - Jim Hamill, inducted in 2004
  - Anthony Burger, inducted in 2007
  - Ray Dean Reese, inducted in 2008
  - Squire Parsons, inducted in 2008
  - Mark Trammell, inducted in 2018
  - Ernie Phillips, inducted in 2019
  - Arthur Rice, inducted in 2022
  - Nick Bruno, inducted in 2025
  - Martin Cook (with the Kingsmen briefly in 1957), inducted in 2003

== External links and references ==
- The Official Kingsmen Quartet web site
- Southern Gospel Music history: Kingsmen Quartet
- Illustrated discography
