= T. Graham Brown discography =

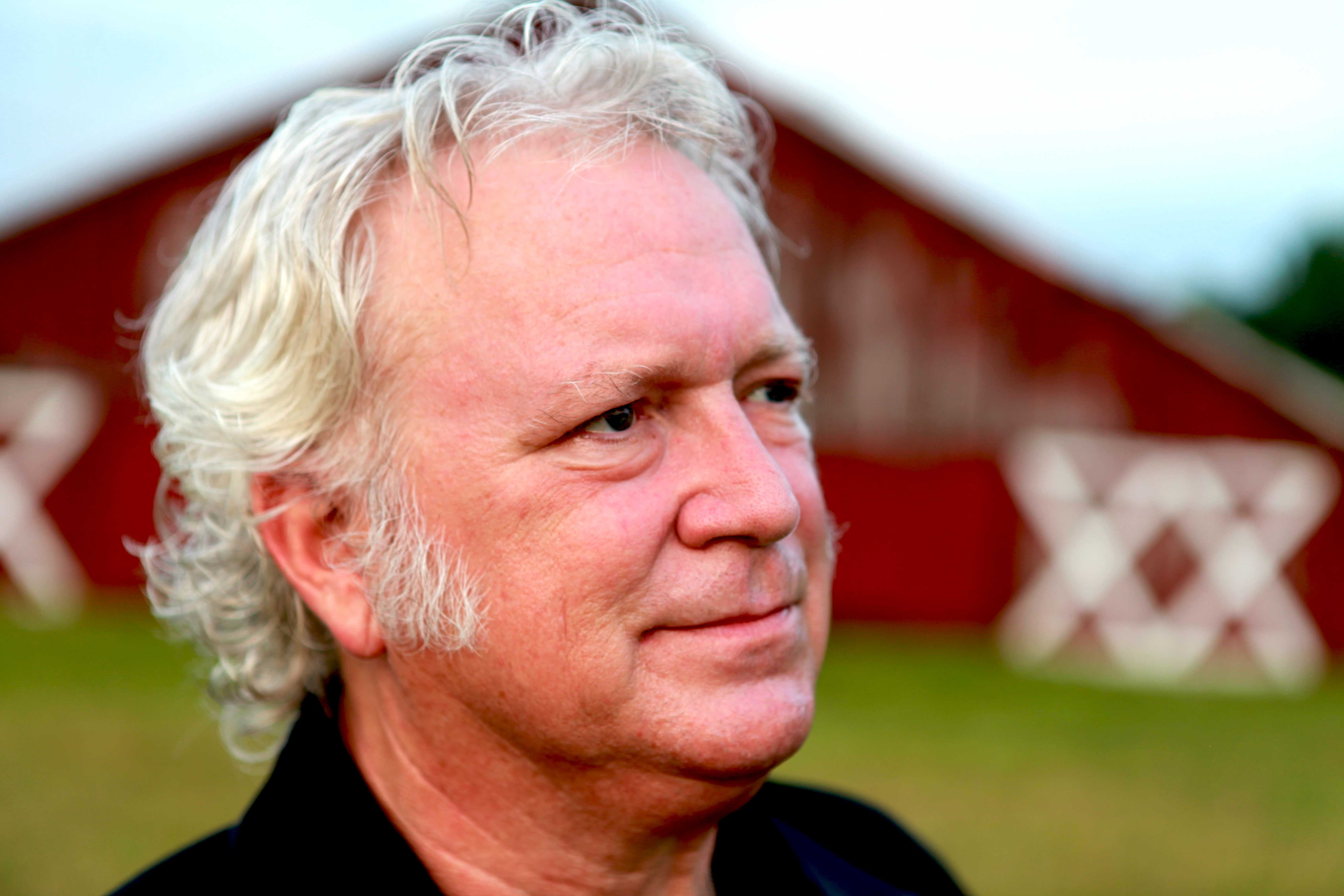
- T. Graham Brown in 2015.
- Studio albums: 12
- Live albums: 2
- Compilation albums: 3
- Singles: 23
- Music videos: 9

American country music singer T. Graham Brown has released 23 singles and 12 studio albums. He made his debut in 1985 with the single "Drowning in Memories", his first for Capitol Records Nashville. Brown recorded for this label between then and 1991, reaching the top of the Billboard Hot Country Songs charts with "Hell and High Water", "Don't Go to Strangers", and "Darlene". After leaving Capitol in 1991, he recorded for Acme, Intersound, Aspirion, and RED Records.

== Albums ==
Year	Album	Peak chart positions		
Year	Album	US Country	US Heat	CAN Country
1986	I Tell It Like It Used to Be: Label: Capitol Nashville	15	—	—
1987	Brilliant Conversationalist: Label: Capitol Nashville	23	—	—
1988	Come as You Were: Label: Capitol Nashville	22	—	—
1990	Bumper to Bumper: Label: Capitol Nashville	33	—	—
1991	You Can't Take It with You: Label: Capitol Nashville	—	—	—
1996	From a Stronger Place: Label: Acme Sounds	—	—	—
1998	Wine into Water: Label: Intersound Records	47	38	19
2003	The Next Right Thing: Label: Intersound Records	—	—	—
2006	The Present: Label: Aspirion	—	—	—
2015	Forever Changed: Label: RED	37	7	—
2015	Christmas with T. Graham Brown: Label: Self-released	—	—	—
2020	Bare Bones: Label: Time Life Music	—	—	—

=== Live albums ===
Year	Album
2001	Lives!
2004	Live at Billy Bob's Texas

=== Compilation albums ===
Year	Album
1990	Greatest Hits
2007	Deja Vu All Over Again/The Best of T. Graham Brown
2015	Snapshot

== Singles ==
Year	Single	Peak positions		Album
Year	Single	US Country	CAN Country	Album
1985	"Drowning in Memories"	39	—	—N/a
1985	"I Tell It Like It Used to Be"	7	—	I Tell It Like It Used to Be
1986	"I Wish That I Could Hurt That Way Again"	3	2	I Tell It Like It Used to Be
1986	"Hell and High Water"	1	1	I Tell It Like It Used to Be
1986	"Don't Go to Strangers"	1	1	I Tell It Like It Used to Be
1987	"Brilliant Conversationalist"	9	4	Brilliant Conversationalist
1987	"She Couldn't Love Me Anymore"	4	3	Brilliant Conversationalist
1988	"The Last Resort"	4	4	Brilliant Conversationalist
1988	"Darlene"	1	1	Come as You Were
1988	"Come as You Were"	7	—	Come as You Were
1989	"Never Say Never"	30	22	Come as You Were
1990	"If You Could Only See Me Now"	6	5	Bumper to Bumper
1990	"Moonshadow Road"	18	9	Bumper to Bumper
1991	"I'm Sending One Up for You"	53	75	Bumper to Bumper
1991	"With This Ring"	31	29	You Can't Take It with You
1991	"You Can't Take It with You"	—	68	You Can't Take It with You
1998	"Wine into Water"	44	61	Wine into Water
1999	"Happy Ever After"	68	90	Wine into Water
1999	"Never in a Million Tears"	63	94	Wine into Water
1999	"Memphis Women & Chicken"	73	—	Wine into Water
2003	"Middle Age Crazy"	58	—	The Next Right Thing
2006	"The Present"	—	—	The Present
2014	"He'll Take Care of You" (with Vince Gill)	—	—	Forever Changed
"—" denotes releases that did not chart * denotes unknown peak positions

=== Guest singles ===
Year	Single	Artist	Peak positions		Album
Year	Single	Artist	US Country	CAN Country	Album
1990	"Tomorrow's World"	Various Artists	74	—	—N/a
1990	"Don't Go Out"	Tanya Tucker	6	11	Tennessee Woman
2000	"Now That's Awesome"	Bill Engvall (with Neal McCoy and Tracy Byrd)	59	—	Now That's Awesome
2012	"Don't Sit Under the Apple Tree"	Carol Channing	—	—	True to the Red, White and Blue
2013	"Working on a Building"	Marty Raybon (with Trace Adkins and Jimmy Fortune)	—	—	Working on a Building
2018	"I Am The One"	Joanne Cash	_	_	Unbroken
"—" denotes releases that did not chart

=== Music videos ===
Year	Title	Director
1986	"Hell and High Water"	George Bloom
1987	"Brilliant Conversationalist"	
1988	"RFD-30529"	John Davis
1988	"Come as You Were"	John Lloyd Miller
1990	"Don't Go Out" (with Tanya Tucker)	Jack Cole
1991	"You Can't Take It With You"	
1998	"Wine Into Water"	Tom Bevins
1999	"Happy Ever After"	Tom Bevins
2003	"Which Way To Pray"	

=== Guest appearances ===
Year	Video	Director
1990	"Tomorrow's World" (Various Artists)	Gustavo Garzon
2000	"Now That's Awesome" (with Bill Engvall, Neal McCoy & Tracy Byrd)	Peter Zavadil
2012	"Working on a Building" (with Marty Raybon, Jimmy Fortune & Trace Adkins)	Mark Carman
2018	"I Am The One" (with Joanne Cash)	Chad Randall Crow
