= Grammy Award for Best Roots Gospel Album =

Music award

- Awarded for: quality gospel performances in the American Roots subgenres (folk, bluegrass, 'southern' gospel, regional roots music, etc.)
- Country: United States
- Presented by: National Academy of Recording Arts and Sciences
- First award: 2015
- Currently held by: The Brooklyn Tabernacle Choir – I Will Not Be Moved (Live) (2026)
- Website: grammy.com

The Grammy Award for Best Roots Gospel Album has been an award category at the annual Grammy Awards since 2015.

The award was first approved by the board of trustees of the Grammy Awards in June 2014.

According to NARAS, the award was introduced to "provide a category for traditional Southern gospel and other "roots" gospel albums as both a protector of the heritage of this music and an acknowledgement of the growing interest and support of these genres." It is similar to the Grammy Award for Best Southern, Country or Bluegrass Gospel Album category which was active from 1991 to 2011.

The category is open for solo artists, duos, groups and other collaborations and is for albums only. In the Gospel genre field, it will sit with other categories such as Best Gospel Album and Best Contemporary Christian Music Album.

The Grammy is awarded to the performer(s) on the winning recording. If there is no identifiable artist (e.g. in soundtrack or various artist albums), the award is given to the (compilation) producer(s).

== Recipients ==
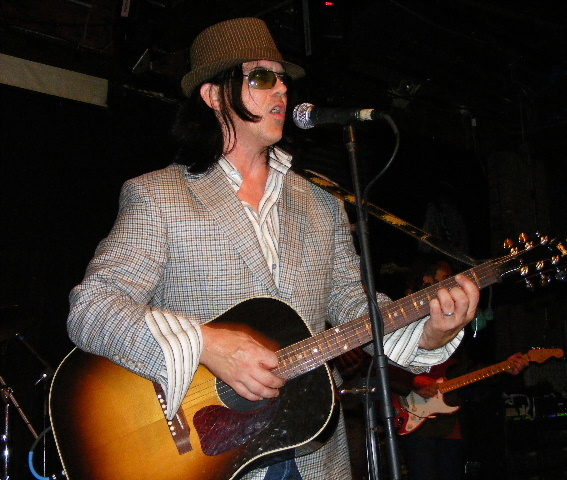
Mike Farris was the first recipient of the award in 2015.

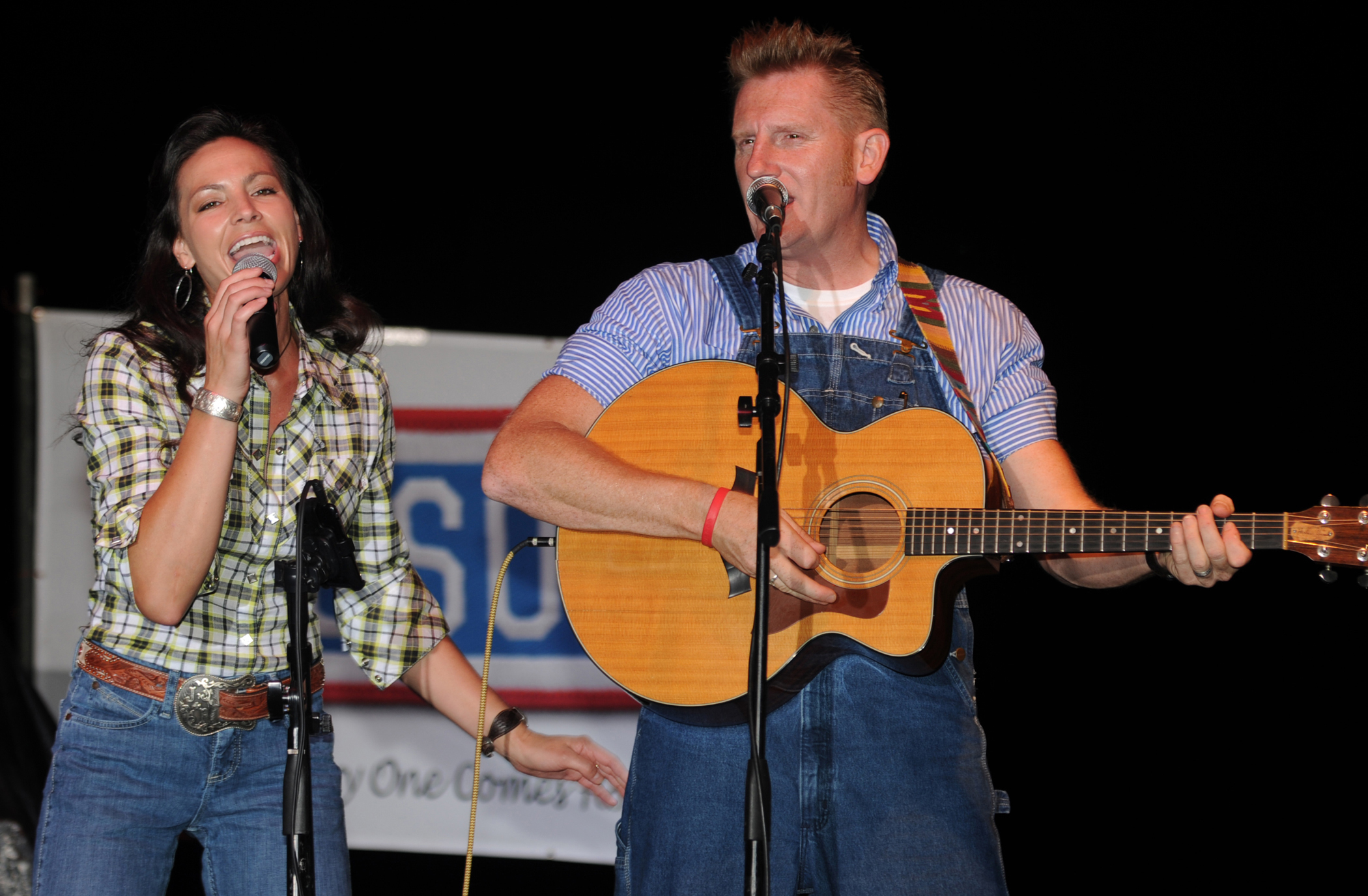
Joey + Rory won in 2017. Rory accepted the award almost one year after Joey died.

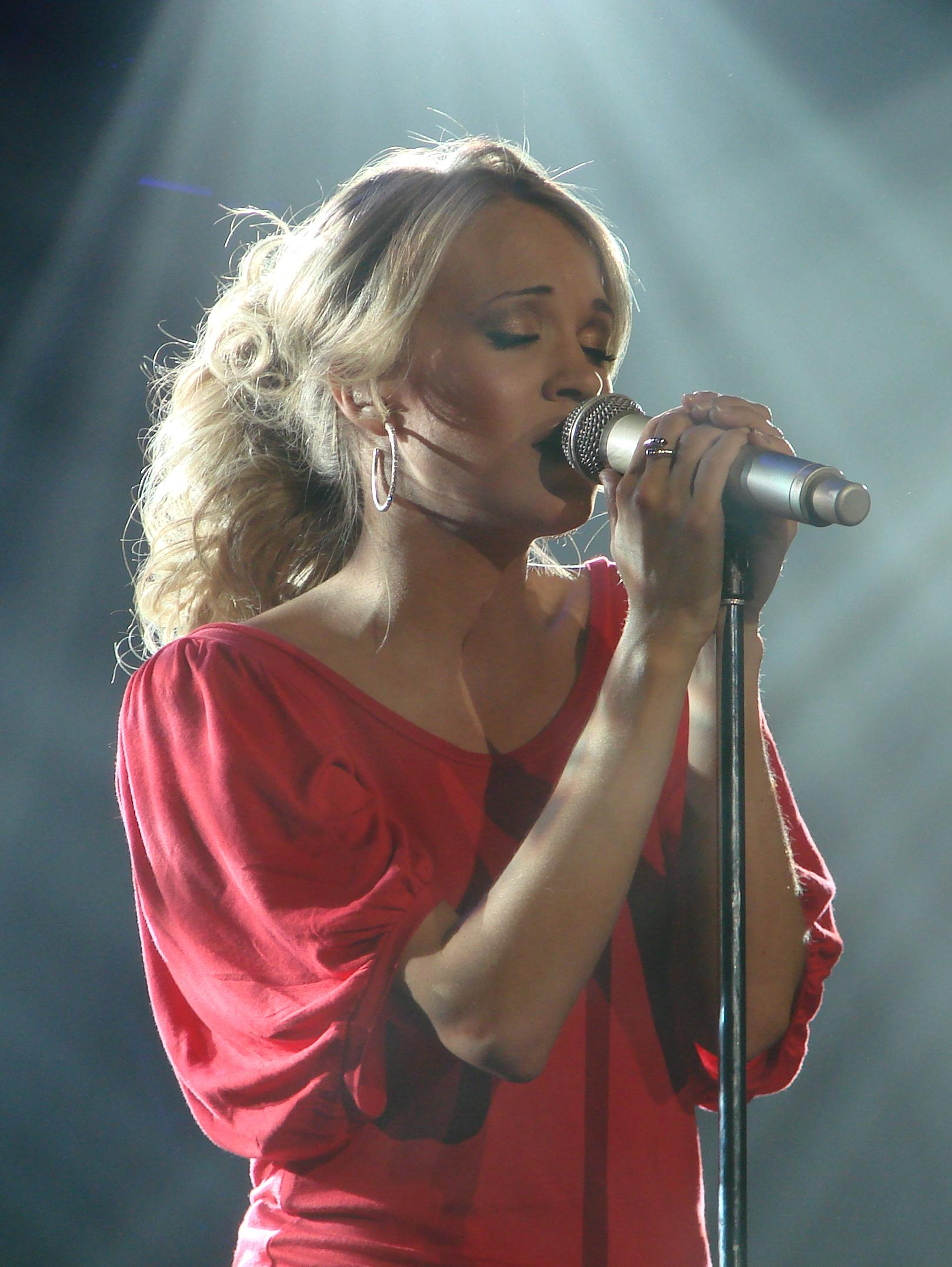
2022 winner Carrie Underwood.

=== 2010s ===
Year	Work	Artist
2015
2015	Shine for All the People	Mike Farris
2015	A Cappella	The Martins
2015	Forever Changed	T. Graham Brown
2015	His Way of Loving Me	Tim Menzies
2015	Hymns	Gaither Vocal Band
2016
2016	Still Rockin' My Soul	The Fairfield Four
2016	Directions Home (Songs We Love, Songs You Know)	Point of Grace
2016	Pray Now	Karen Peck and New River
2017
2017	Hymns That Are Important to Us	Joey + Rory
2017	Better Together	Gaither Vocal Band
2017	God Don't Never Change: The Songs of Blind Willie Johnson	Various Artists
2017	Hymns and Songs of Inspiration	Gordon Mote
2017	Nature's Symphony in 432	The Isaacs
2018
2018	Sing It Now: Songs of Faith & Hope	Reba McEntire
2018	The Best of the Collingsworth Family, Volume 1	The Collingsworth Family
2018	Give Me Jesus	Larry Cordle
2018	Hope for All Nations	Karen Peck and New River
2018	Resurrection	Joseph Habedank
2019
2019	Unexpected	Jason Crabb
2019	Clear Skies	Ernie Haase & Signature Sound
2019	Favorites: Revisited by Request	The Isaacs
2019	Love Love Love	Gordon Mote
2019	Still Standing	The Martins

=== 2020s ===
Year	Work	Artist
2020
2020	Testimony	Gloria Gaynor
2020	Deeper Oceans	Joseph Habedank
2020	Deeper Roots: Where the Bluegrass Grows	Steven Curtis Chapman
2020	Gonna Sing, Gonna Shout	Various Artists
2020	His Name Is Jesus	Tim Menzies
2021
2021	Celebrating Fisk! (The 150th Anniversary Album)	Fisk Jubilee Singers
2021	20/20	The Crabb Family
2021	Beautiful Day	Mark Bishop
2021	Something Beautiful: Our Favorite Songs of Bill & Gloria Gaither	Ernie Haase and Signature Sound
2021	What Christmas Really Means	The Erwins
2022
2022	My Savior	Carrie Underwood
2022	Alone with My Faith	Harry Connick Jr.
2022	Keeping On	Ernie Haase & Signature Sound
2022	Songs for the Times	The Isaacs
2022	That's Gospel, Brother	Gaither Vocal Band
2023
2023	The Urban Hymnal	Tennessee State University Marching Band
2023	2:22	Karen Peck and New River
2023	Confessio - Irish-American Roots	Keith & Kristyn Getty
2023	Let's Just Praise the Lord	Gaither Vocal Band
2023	The Willie Nelson Family	Willie Nelson
2024
2024	Echoes of the South	Blind Boys of Alabama
2024	Meet Me at the Cross	Brian Free & Assurance
2024	Shine: The Darker the Night, the Brighter the Light	Gaither Vocal Band
2024	Songs That Pulled Me Through the Tough Times	Becky Isaacs Bowman
2024	Tribute to the King	The Blackwood Brothers Quartet
2025
2025	Church	Cory Henry
2025	The Gospel According to Mark	Mark D. Conklin
2025	The Gospel Sessions, Vol. 2	Authentic Unlimited
2025	Loving You	The Nelons
2025	Rhapsody	The Harlem Gospel Travelers
2026
2026	I Will Not Be Moved (Live)	The Brooklyn Tabernacle Choir
2026	Back to My Roots	Candi Staton
2026	Good Answers	Karen Peck and New River
2026	Praise & Worship: More Than a Hollow Hallelujah	The Isaacs
2026	Then Came the Morning	Gaither Vocal Band
2027
2027	A Fireside Christmas	Karen Peck and New River
2027	Light. Hope. Faith.	Cara Paige
2027	On a Different Note	Tim Lovelace
2027	Rise and Shine	Sunday Drive
2027	Through the Fire	Jason Crabb

== Artists with multiple nominations ==
6 nominations

- Gaither Vocal Band

5 nominations

- Karen Peck and New River

4 nominations

- The Isaacs

3 nominations

- Ernie Haase & Signature Sound

2 nominations

- Jason Crabb
- The Martins
- Tim Menzies
- Joseph Habedank
- Gordon Mote

== See also ==
- List of Grammy Award categories
