= Forever Changed (album) =

Studio album by T. Graham Brown
- Released: January 27, 2015
- Studio: The Tracking Room, Nashville, TN; TMC Studios
- Genre: Religious
- Length: 49:52
- Label: RED Distribution
- Producer: Mark Carman; T. Graham Brown

T. Graham Brown chronology
The Present (2006)	Forever Changed (2015)	Christmas with T. Graham Brown (2015)

Forever Changed is the ninth studio album by T. Graham Brown. It was nominated for a Grammy in the category of Roots Gospel at the 57th Annual Grammy Awards. The album peaked at No. 7 on Billboard's Heatseekers chart and at No. 37 on their Country Albums chart.

== Track listing ==
No.	Title	Writer(s)	Special Guest	Length
1.	"He'll Take Care of You"	Donnie Fritts; Dan Penn; Gary Nicholson	Vince Gill	3:06
2.	"From a Stronger Place"	T. Graham Brown; Steve Schuffert		3:31
3.	"Soul Talk"	T. Graham Brown; Gary Nicholson; Danny Flowers	Jason Crabb	3:10
4.	"Forever Changed"	Carson Whitsett; Dan Penn; Hoy Lindsey		3:42
5.	"Shadow of a Doubt"	Gary Nicholson	Leon Russell	4:04
6.	"Power of Love"	Gary Nicholson; Don Cook	Jeff & Sheri Easter	3:30
7.	"Out of the Rain"	Tony Joe White		5:11
8.	"People Get Ready"	Curtis Mayfield	Jason Crabb; Leon Russell; Steve Cropper; The Oak Ridge Boys	4:10
9.	"Pillow of Mercy"	T. Graham Brown; Dan Penn; Gary Nicholson	The Booth Brothers	3:59
10.	"Midnight Rainbow"	Carson Whitsett; Dan Penn; Jonnie Barnett	Three Bridges	3:16
11.	"Which Way to Pray"	T. Graham Brown; Bill Anderson; Gary Nicholson	Sonya Isaacs	4:06
12.	"How Do You Know"	Delaney Bramlett; Gary Nicholson	The Oak Ridge Boys	4:25
13.	"Wine Into Water"	T. Graham Brown; Ted Hewitt; Bruce Burch	Jimmy Fortune	3:42
Total length:				49:52

Track information and credits verified from Discogs, AllMusic, and the album's liner notes.

== Musicians ==
- T. Graham Brown – Vocals
- Kelly Back – Acoustic Guitar, Electric Guitar
- Steve Brewster – Drums
- Pat Coil – Keyboards, Piano
- Eric Darken – Percussion
- Mark Fain – Bass Guitar
- David Hungate – Bass Guitar
- Rob Ickes – Dobro
- Brent Mason – Electric Guitar
- James Mitchell – Electric Guitar
- Lonnie Wilson – Drums
- Bruce Watkins – Acoustic Guitar, Arranger, Session Leader
- John Willis – Banjo, Acoustic Guitar
- The J-Horn Section – Horn
- John Ketchings – Cello
- Sam Levine – Flute, Saxophone
- Gary Prim – Keyboards, Piano
- Gayle Mayes – Background Vocals
- Angie Primm – Background Vocals
- Mark Carman – Keyboards, Piano
- David Floyd – Orchestration
- The Booth Brothers – Vocals (Track 9)
- Jeff & Sheri Easter – Vocals (Track 6)
- Jason Crabb – Vocals (Tracks 3, 8)
- Jimmy Fortune – Vocals (Track 13)
- Steve Cropper – Electric Guitar, Vocals (Track 8)
- Sonya Isaacs – Vocals (Track 11)
- Three Bridges – Vocals (Track 10)
- Leon Russell – Vocals (Tracks 5, 8)
- The Oak Ridge Boys – Vocals (Track 8)

== Production ==
- T. Graham Brown – Producer
- Mark Carman – Producer, Arranger, Executive Producer
- Alan Silverman – Mastering
- Sheila Brown – Project Coordinator
- Joe Carrell – Engineer
- Jared Clement – Second Engineer
- Vince Gill – Featured Artist
- William Lee Golden – Cover Photo
- Courtney Groennert – Production Assistant
- Bonnie Hartle – Production Assistant
- Tim Higginbotham – Vocal Editing

== Charts ==
Date	Chart	Peak position
February 5, 2016	US Heatseekers Albums (Billboard)	7
February 5, 2016	US Top Country Albums (Billboard)	37
