= Jesus Loves Me =

Hymn popular among children

- by Anna Bartlett Warner
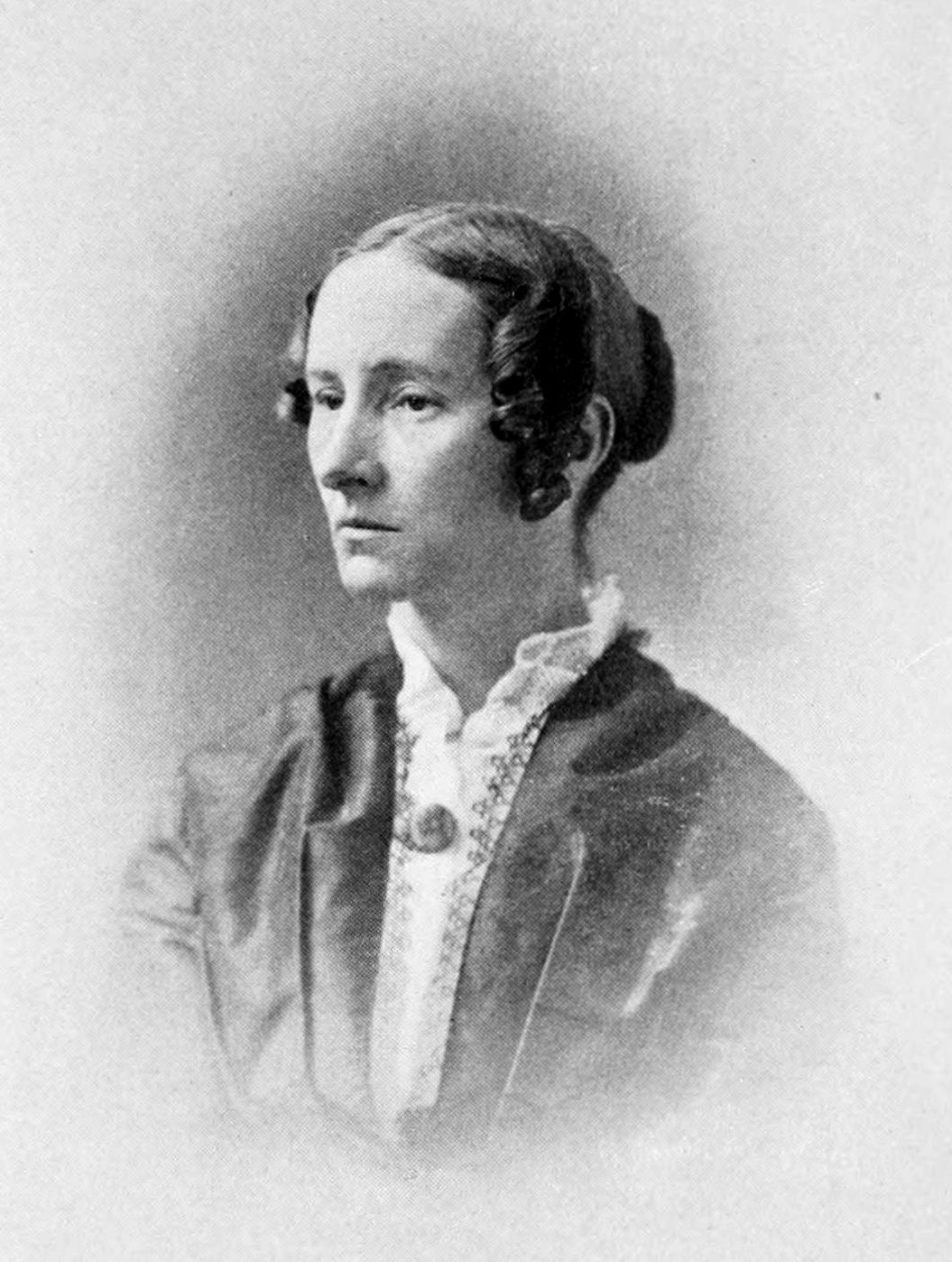
- Anna Bartlett Warner
- Genre: Hymn
- Written: 1859
- Based on: 1 Corinthians 6:19
- Meter: 7.7.7.7 with refrain
- Melody: "China" by William Batchelder Bradbury

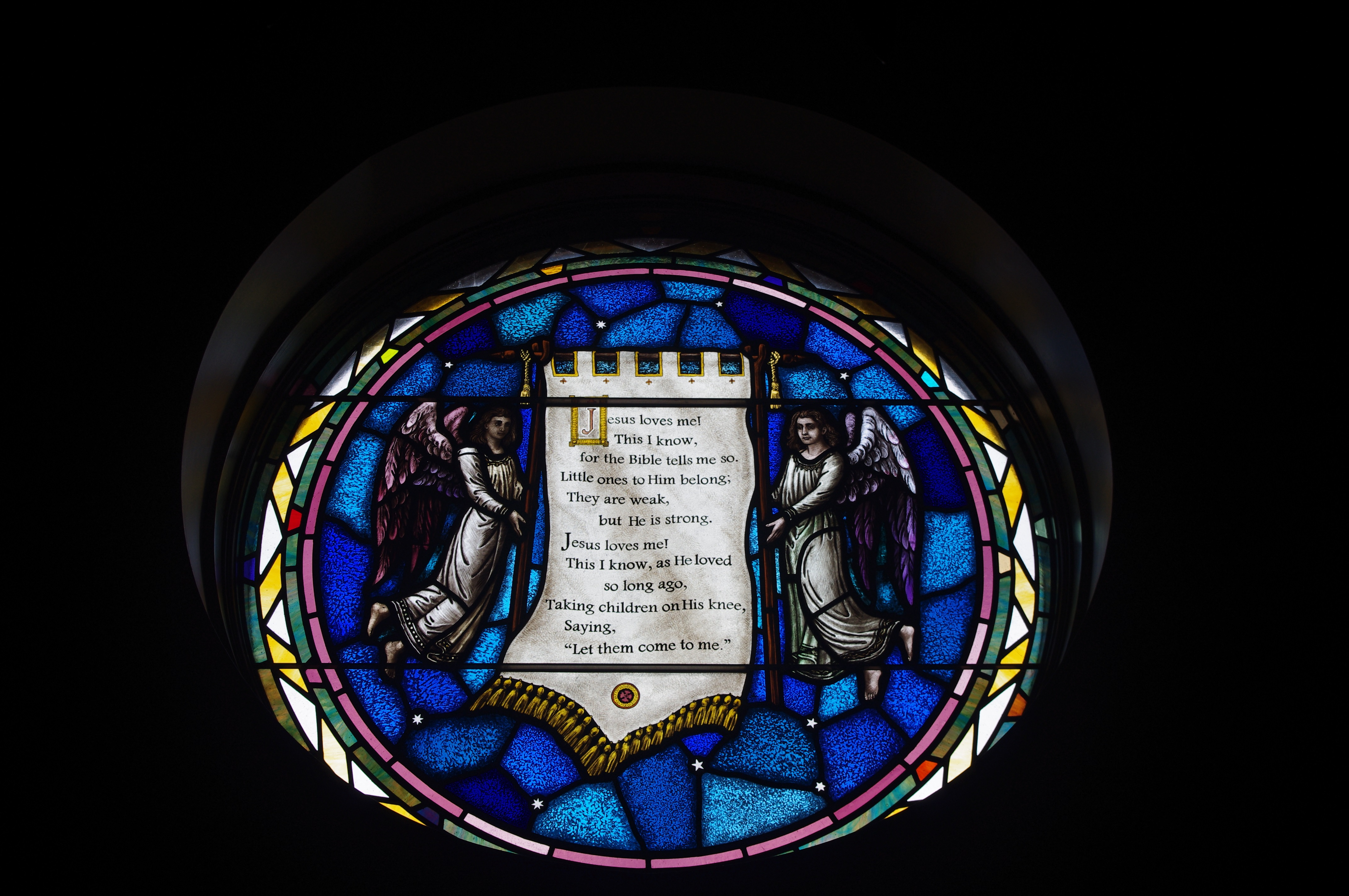
Saint Paul Church (Westerville, Ohio) - Angel room, Jesus Loves Me stained glass window

"Jesus Loves Me" is a Christian hymn written by Anna Bartlett Warner (1827–1915). The lyrics first appeared as a poem in the context of an 1860 novel called Say and Seal, written by her older sister Susan Warner (1819–1885), in which the words were spoken as a comforting poem to a dying child. The tune was added in 1862 by William Batchelder Bradbury (1816–1868). Along with his tune, Bradbury added his own chorus "Yes, Jesus loves me, Yes, Jesus Loves me..." After publication as a song it became a popular hymn in English-language churches.

== Poem by Anna Bartlett Warner ==
As originally published in 1860, it appeared in four stanzas, as follows:

Jesus loves me—this I know,
For the Bible tells me so:
Little ones to him belong,—
They are weak, but he is strong.

Jesus loves me—he who died
Heaven's gate to open wide;
He will wash away my sin,
Let his little child come in.

Jesus loves me—loves me still,
Though I'm very weak and ill;
From his shining throne on high,
Comes to watch me where I lie.

Jesus loves me—he will stay
Close beside me all the way.
Then his little child will take
Up to heaven for his dear sake.

== Hymn by William Batchelder Bradbury ==
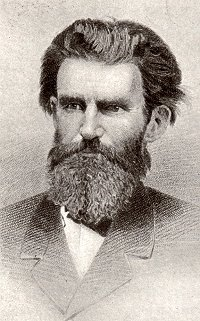
William Batchelder Bradbury

Bradbury's Golden Shower of S.S. Melodies: a new collection of hymns and tunes for the Sabbath school, edited by Wm. B. Bradbury, New York, 1862:

Jesus loves me—this I know,
For the Bible tells me so;
Little ones to Him belong—
They are weak, but He is strong.

Refrain:
Yes, Jesus loves me,
Yes, Jesus loves me,
Yes, Jesus loves me—
The Bible tells me so!

Jesus loves me—He who died
Heaven's gate to open wide;
He will wash away my sin,
Let His little child come in. Refrain

Jesus loves me—loves me still,
Though I'm very weak and ill;
From His shining throne on high,
Comes to watch me where I lie. Refrain

Jesus loves me—He will stay
Close beside me all the way;
If I love Him, when I die
He will take me home on high. Refrain

== History ==
In 1943 in the Solomon Islands, John F. Kennedy's PT-109 was rammed and sunk. Islanders Biuku Gasa and Eroni Kumana who found Kennedy and the survivors remember that when they rode on PT boats to retrieve the survivors, the Marines sang this song with the natives, who had learned it from Seventh-day Adventist missionaries.

This hymn was titled "China" in some hymnals of the 19th century. Some early hymnals, such as The Modern Hymnal (1926) explain this title with a subtitled note that says, "The favorite Hymn of China". By the time of later hymnals such as the Baptist Hymnal (1956), the subtitle had been dropped and the tune was simply called "CHINA".

== Revised versions ==
The poem and the hymn, or portions of them, have sometimes been revised. Some examples of this are

- The book Jack Bauer's Having a Bad Day presented a version which alternated Yes, Jesus Loves Me with ... Loves Us and Loves You.
- A message presented in the book Good Morning Message builds on the line refrain as follows: "Yes, Jesus loves me ... Yes, Jesus loves you ... allow Him to help you through your day, every day. ..."
- The inspirational book From Chains to Change presented a version in which the line "Little ones to Him belong" was rendered as "Little ones to Him below".

== Notable performances ==
The song has been recorded by a large number of different artists, either obscure or famous. Some versions include the following:

- 1972: Ray Stevens on Turn Your Radio On
- 1980: John Fahey on Yes! Jesus Loves Me
- 1975: Bobby Womack on I Don't Know What the World Is Coming To
- 1991: Jim Eanes and Bobby Atkins on Heart of the South
- 1992: Whitney Houston on The Bodyguard soundtrack
- 1994: Shanice on 21...Ways to Grow
- 1997: Brenda Lee on Precious Memories
- 1998: Bob Carlisle on Butterfly Kisses & Bedtime Prayers
- 2000: Rosemary Clooney on Many a Wonderful Moment
- 2000: Aaron Neville on Devotion
- 2001: Destiny's Child on Survivor
- 2004: CocoRosie on La Maison de Mon Rêve (a parody denouncing American Christianity)
- 2006: Alabama on Songs of Inspiration
- 2008: Dionne Warwick on Why We Sing
- 2012: Whitney Houston and Kelly Price; Houston's last performance in an impromptu duet at a nightclub
- 2022: Tennessee State University Aristocrat of Bands on The Urban Hymnal, the first album by a college marching band to win a Grammy

== See also ==
- Christian child's prayer
