= Don't Go to Strangers (disambiguation) =

Don't Go to Strangers may refer to:

- Don't Go to Strangers, a 1960 album by Etta Jones
- "Don't Go to Strangers", a 1954 song by Arthur Kent & Dave Mann (music) and Redd Evans (lyrics)
- Don't Go to Strangers (T. Graham Brown song)
- "Don't Go to Strangers", a song by J. J. Cale from Naturally
