= Come as You Were =

Single by T. Graham Brown

from the album Come as You Were
- B-side: "The Time Machine"
- Released: December 10, 1988
- Genre: Country
- Length: 2:58
- Label: Capitol
- Songwriter(s): Paul Craft
- Producer(s): Ron Chancey

T. Graham Brown singles chronology
"Darlene" (1988)	"Come as You Were" (1988)	"Never Say Never" (1989)

"Come as You Were" is a song written by Paul Craft and first recorded by American country music artist Joe Stampley on his 1980 album After Hours. It was later recorded by American country pop music artist Jerry Lee Lewis in 1983 as a single from his album My Fingers Do the Talkin on MCA Records and it peaked at #66 on the country music charts.

In 1986, Barbara Mandrell cut the song for her Moments album, but it was not released as a single.

In 1988, T. Graham Brown covered the song for his album Come as You Were, releasing it as a single in December and taking it to #7 on the country music chart.

== Chart performance ==
Chart (1988–1989)	Peak position
US Hot Country Songs (Billboard)	7

=== Year-end charts ===
Chart (1989)	Position
Canada Country Tracks (RPM)	84
US Country Songs (Billboard)	88
