= Never Say Never (T. Graham Brown song) =

Single by T. Graham Brown

from the album Come as You Were
- B-side: "I Read a Letter Today"
- Released: April 29, 1989
- Genre: Country
- Length: 3:16
- Label: Capitol Nashville
- Songwriter(s): Walt Aldridge, Tom Brasfield
- Producer(s): Ron Chancey

T. Graham Brown singles chronology
| "Come as You Were" (1988) | "Never Say Never" (1989) | "If You Could Only See Me Now" (1990) |

"Never Say Never" is a song recorded by American country music artist T. Graham Brown. It was released in April 1989 as the third single from the album Come as You Were. The song reached #30 on the Billboard Hot Country Singles & Tracks chart. The song was written by Walt Aldridge and Tom Brasfield

== Critical reception ==
A review at mykindofcountry.wordpress.com said the song was a rather shouty blues rock style number that has little to do with country music and sounds very dated today.

== Chart performance ==
| Chart (1989) | Peak position |
|---|---|
| US Hot Country Songs (Billboard) | 30 |
| Canadian RPM Country Tracks | 22 |
