= Moonshadow Road =

Single by T. Graham Brown

from the album Bumper to Bumper
- Released: September 15, 1990
- Genre: Country
- Length: 3:47
- Label: Capitol
- Songwriters: T. Graham Brown, Verlon Thompson, Gary Nicholson
- Producers: Barry Beckett, T. Graham Brown

T. Graham Brown singles chronology
| "Don't Go Out" (1990) | "Moonshadow Road" (1990) | "I'm Sending One Up for You" (1991) |

"Moonshadow Road" is a song co-written and recorded by American country music artist T. Graham Brown. It was released in September 1990 as the second single from the album Bumper to Bumper. The song reached #18 on the Billboard Hot Country Singles & Tracks chart. Brown wrote the song with Verlon Thompson and Gary Nicholson.

== Chart performance ==
| Chart (1990) | Peak position |
|---|---|
| Canada Country Singles (RPM) | 9 |
| US Hot Country Songs (Billboard) | 18 |
