= The Urban Hymnal =

Studio album by Aristocrat of Bands
- Released: September 23, 2022
- Recorded: 2022
- Venue: Tennessee State University campus, Nashville, Tennessee, United States
- Genre: Gospel
- Length: 31:39
- Producer: Dallas Austin; Larry Jenkins; Sir the Baptist; Dubba-AA

The Urban Hymnal is the debut album by the Tennessee State University marching band Aristocrat of Bands. The album won the 2023 Grammy Award for Best Roots Gospel Album.

== Recording and release ==
The album came about when Sir the Baptist visited the TSU campus and saw the Aristocrat of Bands performing. He suggested that he could record the group during an artist residency, and the recording took place on campus, with final editing being completed in mid-2022. Dallas Austin came in to produce the album with Sir. Word spread in the Gospel music community, leading to several established pop gospel artists appearing on the album, as well as faculty and staff of the university.

== Reception ==
Jewly Hight of WNXP named this the album of the week for September 27, 2022, praising the showmanship on the recording and how difficult it is to capture on record.

The Aristocrat of Bands submitted the recording for Grammy consideration in August 2022, in the category Best Roots Gospel Album. The band promoted the album by performing at the half-time show of a Tennessee Titans game. The band won the Grammy award in 2023.

== Track listing ==
1. "Turner’s Overture – I’m So Glad" – 1:02
2. "Dance Revival" – 3:06
3. "FLY (Y.M.M.F.)" – 3:28
4. "Going Going" – 3:21
5. "Alright" – 3:58
6. "Me Too" – 5:15
7. "Jesus Loves Me" – 1:16
8. "Purpose" – 4:16
9. "Blessings on Blessings" – 3:58
10. "Alma Mater" – 1:59

== Personnel ==
- Aristocrat of Bands

Guest artists

- Dallas Austin on "Dance Revival", production
- Jamal Bryant on "Alright"
- Jekalyn Carr on "Dance Revival"
- ChurchPpl on "Dance Revival", "Going Going", "Me Too", "Purpose", and "Blessings on Blessings"
- Dubba-AA on "Going Going" and "Purpose"
- San Franklin on "Purpose"
- Glenda Glover on "Turner’s Overture – I’m So Glad"
- Edward L. Graves on "Alma Mater"
- Derrick Greene on "Alma Mater"
- Fred Hammond on "Me Too"
- J. Ivy on "Alright"
- Larry Jenkins on "Alright" and "Alma Mater", production
- John P. Kee on "Alright", "Me Too"
- Donald Lawrence on "Blessings on Blessings"
- Reginald McDonald on "Alma Mater"
- James Sexton on "Alma Mater"
- Kierra Sheard on "Going Going"
- Sir the Baptist on "Dance Revival", "Going Going", "Alright", "Me Too", "Purpose", and "Blessings on Blessings"; production
- Mekayla Smith on "Alright"
- W. Crimm Singers on "Me Too"
- Louis York on "Blessings on Blessings"
- DJ Hollygrove- Engineer

== See also ==
- Lists of 2022 albums
