= I Wish That I Could Hurt That Way Again =

Single by T. Graham Brown

from the album I Tell It Like It Used to Be
- B-side: "You're Trying Too Hard"
- Released: April 26, 1986
- Genre: Country
- Length: 3:03
- Label: Capitol
- Songwriter(s): Curly Putman, Rafe Van Hoy, Don Cook
- Producer(s): Bud Logan

T. Graham Brown singles chronology
"I Tell It Like It Used to Be" (1985)	"I Wish That I Could Hurt That Way Again" (1986)	"Hell and High Water" (1986)

"I Wish That I Could Hurt That Way Again" is a song written by Curly Putman, Rafe Van Hoy and Don Cook, and first recorded by American country music artist Kenny Rogers, released in 1978 on his multi-million selling album The Gambler, although Rogers did not release it as a single the album included two number 1 singles in the title cut and "She Believes In Me".

T. Graham Brown released a cover version in April 1986 as the second single from his album I Tell It Like It Used to Be. Brown's version reached #3 on the Billboard Hot Country Singles & Tracks chart.

== Other versions ==
The song was also recorded by T. G. Sheppard on his 1979 album 3/4 Lonely.

== Chart performance ==
Chart (1986)	Peak position
US Hot Country Songs (Billboard)	3
Canadian RPM Country Tracks	2
