= Mark Carman =

American singer-songwriter

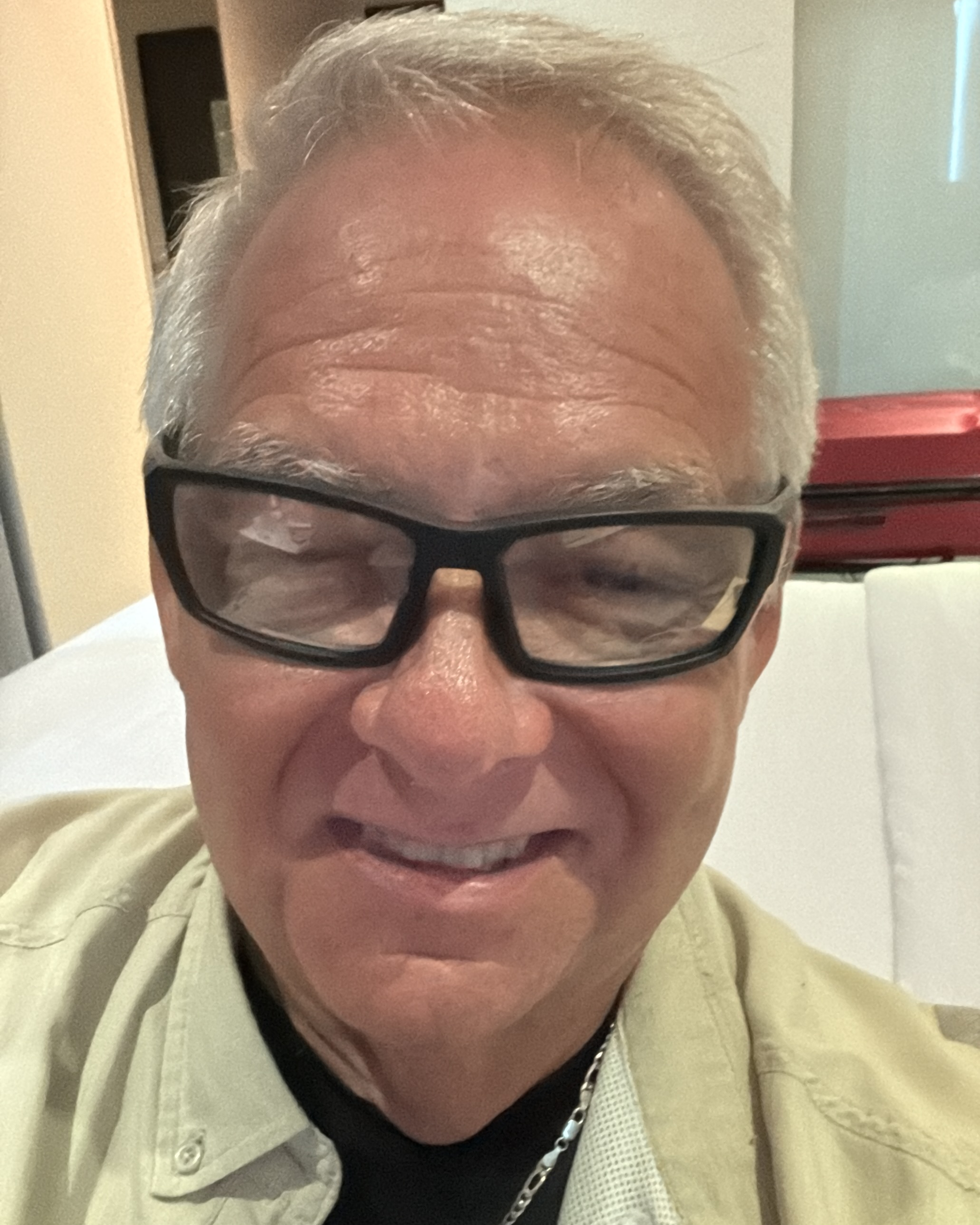

Background information
- Born: Mark Lewyn Carman; September 3, 1960 (age 65); Joliet, Illinois
- Origin: Beckley, West Virginia
- Occupations: Music producer; singer; songwriter; social activist
- Instruments: Vocals, keyboards
- Years active: 1970 – present
- Labels: TRA-Star Records, Cherrytree Records, Sony, Red Distribution, MCM World Media, Provident Label Group, Universal

Mark Lewyn Carman (born September 3, 1960) is an American music producer, singer, songwriter, and social activist.

== Career ==
=== Music ===
Carman's early career in the music industry included serving as the Director of Operations at the music trade publication Cash Box magazine beginning in 1989. In that role, he also hosted the inaugural Nashville Music Awards that same year.

He is known primarily for his later role as the musical arranger and co-producer of the Grammy nominated album by country music artist T. Graham Brown, Forever Changed. The album features guest performances by well-known artists including Leon Russell, Vince Gill, The Oak Ridge Boys, Jason Crabb and others. The recording musicians for the album represented an all-star lineup of musicians, including notable figures such as David Hungate (bass guitar), Brent Mason (electric guitar), Steve Cropper (electric guitar), and Jim Horn (saxophone).

=== Activism ===
In 2015 Carman involved himself in public efforts related to gun control and other social issues by releasing an internet video that garnered more than 1.5 million views in the first week of publication. As part of that effort, Carman founded an activist group, the American Coalition for Responsible Gun Ownership, and made several contributory appearances on national news programs including CNN and CBC News addressing firearms legislation in the United States. Carman's efforts drove the acquisition of more than 1,000,000 signatures on a petition, delivered to Senator Chuck Schumer urging President Barack Obama to use executive order to address some of the issues pertaining to firearms legislation.

In January 2016, Carman was invited to the White House to participate in the announcement of President Obama's executive action on gun control.

=== Awards ===
In 2012 Carman was awarded the President's Call to Service Award (also referred to the President's Lifetime Achievement Award). The Call to Service Award is the most prestigious President's Volunteer Service Award. It has been awarded to only a few Americans for extraordinary service. Among the honorees are S. Truett Cathy, Zach Bonner, Brandon Pugh, Thomas Smith, Timothy Mayer, Thomas Crilly and Stanley Williams). In 2016 Carman was awarded the President's Volunteer Service Award, Gold level, for his volunteer efforts involving public service to orphaned children and homeless adults.

== Albums ==
- 1988 – Heartland - Heartland (producer, artist, composer, keyboards)
- 1989 – The Rebel – Ben Dishner - (producer, composer)
- 1989 – You and The Horse Your Rode in On – Patsy Cole (producer, composer)
- 1989 – Southern Frame of Mind – Heath Locklear (producer, composer)
- 1989 – Jesus Is The Star – Billy Walker (producer, composer)
- 1996 - Smokey and the Impossibles – Smokey and the Impossibles (producer, Keyboards)
- 2006 – It Is What It Is – Steven Hall (producer, composer)
- 2007 – Lo Mejor De Mi – Johnny Vasquez (producer, composer)
- 2007 – She's an Army of One – Various Artists (producer, vocals, keyboards, composer, primary artist)
- 2009 – Lo And Behold (producer, composer) – Palmetto State Quartet
- 2010 – Grace (producer, composer) – Palmetto State Quartet
- 2011 – I'm in Him, He's in Me – Marty Raybon and Various Artists (producer, composer)
- 2011 – Mom's Amazing Grace – Mark Templeton (producer, composer)
- 2012 – Hand to the Plow – Marty Raybon (producer)
- 2012 – Working on a Building – Trace Adkins, Marty Raybon, T. Graham Brown, Jimmy Fortune, Alan Jackson, George Jones, Glen Campbell, Jason Crabb, Aaron Tippin (producer, composer)
- 2013 – Follow – Cindy Hughlett (producer)
- 2013 - We Were Young - The Hunts (Producer)
- 2014 – Forever Changed – T. Graham Brown, Leon Russell, The Oak Ridge Boys, Vince Gill, The Booth Brothers, (producer) Grammy Nomination
- 2014 – Something Old-Something New – Cindy Hughlett (producer)
- 2015 – Trust Me – Cindy Hughlett (producer)
- 2015 – The Wretch – Mark Carman (producer, artist, piano)
- 2015 – Carry the Message – Steve Hess and Southern Salvation (executive producer)
- 2015 – On Top of the Covers – Justin Robinette (executive producer)
- 2015 – Smallest Gifts – Kenzie Walker (producer)
- 2016 – Reflections – Cindy Hughlett (producer, keyboards, arranger)
- 2016 – Careful Where You Step – Mark Carman (producer, artist, piano)
- 2016 – Streets – Rie Sanchez (producer, composer, keyboards)
- 2017 – Mississippi – Kate Stedelbauer (producer, piano, harmonica, keyboards)
- 2024 - Pieces of Me – Mark Carman (Artist, Arranger, Composer, Producer, Piano, Keyboards, Engineer)
- 2025 - Fire On My Wings – Maria Cruz (Arranger, Composer, Producer, Piano, Keyboards)
- 2025 - The One Percent – TRASTAR (Arranger, Producer, Piano, Keyboards)
- 2025 - Christmas In My Heart – Maria Cruz (Arranger, Composer, Producer, Piano, Keyboards)
- 2025 - Dad Bum The World – Piney Creek Trubadors (Arranger, Composer, Producer,)
- 2025 - International Peace – Mark Carman (Keyboards, Arranger, Composer, Producer,)
