= She Couldn't Love Me Anymore =

Single by T. Graham Brown

from the album Brilliant Conversationalist
- B-side: "R.F.D. 30529"
- Released: September 12, 1987
- Genre: Country
- Length: 3:12
- Label: Capitol
- Songwriter(s): Mike McGuire, Billy Henderson, Billy Maddox
- Producer(s): Bud Logan

T. Graham Brown singles chronology
| "Brilliant Conversationalist" (1987) | "She Couldn't Love Me Anymore" (1987) | "The Last Resort" (1988) |

"She Couldn't Love Me Anymore" is a song written by Mike McGuire, Billy Henderson and Billy Maddox, and recorded by American country music artist T. Graham Brown. It was released in September 1987 as the second single from the album Brilliant Conversationalist. Co-writer Mike McGuire is the drummer and founding member of the country music group Shenandoah. The song reached number 4 on the Billboard Hot Country Singles & Tracks chart.

== Chart performance ==
| Chart (1987) | Peak position |
|---|---|
| US Hot Country Songs (Billboard) | 4 |
| Canadian RPM Country Tracks | 3 |
