= Jason Crabb (album) =

Studio album by Jason Crabb
- Released: June 30, 2009
- Studio: Oak Tree Productions and Oak Tree Studios (Hendersonville, Tennessee): Platinum Lab, Uncle Tom's Cabin, The Tracking Room and Blackbird Studios (Nashville, Tennessee)
- Genre: CCM, Country
- Length: 45:58
- Label: Spring Hill Music Group
- Producer: Jason Crabb: Tommy Sims; Norro Wilson

Jason Crabb chronology
Jason Crabb (2009)	Whatever the Road (2015)

Professional ratings
Review scores
Source	Rating
AllMusic	3/5 stars

Jason Crabb is the Grammy-winning debut album from the artist of the same name. The album was released on June 30, 2009, through Spring Hill Music Group.

== Track listing ==
1. "Somebody Like Me" (Michael Boggs, Neil Thrasher) — 4:26
2. "Walk on Water" (Vicky McGehee, Bobby Pinson, Trent Tomlinson) — 3:58
3. "Daystar" (featuring Gaither Vocal Band) (Steve Richardson) — 5:28
4. "Worth It All" (Gerald Crabb) — 3:30
5. "I Will Love You" (Scott Krippayne, Sue C. Smith) — 3:56
6. "Through the Fire" (Gerald Crabb) — 3:47
7. "Sometimes I Cry" (Gerald Crabb) — 3:11
8. "Hope for Me Yet" (Marc Broussard, Radney Foster, Justin Tocket) — 3:52
9. "One Day at a Time" (James Rueger, Tony Wood) — 3:42
10. "Ellsworth" (featuring Vince Gill) (Michael William Dulaney, Wendell Mobley, Neil Thrasher) — 3:50
11. "No Love Lost" (Gordon Kennedy, Tommy Sims) — 4:35
12. "Forever's End" (Randy Goodrum, Carl Utbult) — 4:23

== Awards ==
Crabb's debut album won a Grammy Award for Best Southern/Country/Bluegrass Gospel Album at the 52nd Annual Grammy Awards. Also, at the 41st GMA Dove Awards, the album was nominated for a Dove Award for Country Album of the Year. The song "Somebody Like Me" was nominated for Song of the Year and Country Recorded Song of the Year, winning the latter.

== Chart performance ==
The album peaked at #62 on Billboard 200 and #2 on Billboard's Christian Albums. It stayed 31 weeks on the charts.

== Personnel ==
- Jason Crabb – vocals, backing vocals (2, 4, 7, 10)
- Tre Corley – keyboards (1, 3, 6, 11, 12), Hammond B3 organ (3), string arrangements (5)
- Carl Hergesell – keyboards (1, 3, 6, 11, 12)
- Mike Rojas – acoustic piano (1, 3, 6, 11, 12), keyboards (1, 3, 6, 11, 12), Hammond B3 organ (1)
- Gordon Mote – acoustic piano (2, 4, 5, 7–9), Wurlitzer electric piano (2, 4, 5, 7–9), organ (2, 4, 5, 7–9)
- Justin Ellis – acoustic piano (10), organ (10)
- Gary Burnette – guitars (1, 3, 6, 11, 12)
- Jerry McPherson – guitars (1, 3, 6, 11, 12)
- Jeremy Medkiff – acoustic guitar (1, 3, 6, 11, 12), guitars (1, 3, 6, 11, 12), ganjo (1, 3, 6, 11, 12)
- Tommy Sims – acoustic guitar (1, 3, 6, 11, 12), bass (1, 3, 6, 11, 12)
- Brent Mason – electric guitars (2, 4, 5, 7–9)
- Zachary Smith – ganjo (8), electric guitars (10)
- Bryan Sutton – acoustic guitar (2, 4, 5, 7–9), mandolin (2, 4, 5, 7–9)
- John Willis – acoustic guitar (10)
- Scott Sanders – pedal steel guitar (1, 3, 6, 11, 12)
- Paul Franklin – steel guitar (2, 4, 5, 7–10)
- Duncan Mullins – bass (1–9, 11)
- Larry Paxton – bass (10)
- Dan Needham – drums (1, 3, 6, 11, 12)
- Shannon Forrest – drums (2, 4, 5, 7–9)
- Paul Leim – drums (10)
- Bruce Watkins – fiddle (1, 3, 6, 11, 12)
- Rob Hajacos – fiddle (10)
- The Nashville String Machine – strings (5)
- Russell Mauldin – string arrangements (5)
- Gus Gaches – backing vocals (1, 3, 6, 8, 9, 11, 12)
- Debi Selby – backing vocals (1, 3, 6, 11, 12)
- Adam Crabb – backing vocals (2, 4), harmonica (4, 8)
- Gaither Vocal Band – backing vocals (3)
- Shawnel Corley – backing vocals (5)
- Sonya Isaacs – backing vocals (5)
- Suzanne Young – backing vocals (8, 9)
- Vince Gill – backing vocals (10)

=== Production ===
- Barry Jennings – executive producer
- Tommy Sims – producer (1, 3, 6, 11, 12)
- Tre Corley – additional production (1, 3, 6, 11, 12), mixing (1, 3, 6, 11, 12)
- Jason Crabb – producer (2, 4, 5, 7–9)
- Norro Wilson – producer (10)
- Paul Corley – engineer (1, 3, 6, 11, 12)
- Danny Duncan – engineer (1, 3, 6, 11, 12)
- Ben Fowler – engineer (2, 4, 5, 7–9), mixing (2, 4, 5, 7–10)
- Billy Sherrill – engineer (10)
- Travis Brigman – assistant engineer (1, 3, 6, 11, 12)
- Lowell Reynolds – second engineer (10)
- Andrew Mendelson – mastering at Georgetown Masters (Nashville, Tennessee)
- Natthaphol Abhigantaphand – mastering assistant
- Shelly Anderson – mastering assistant
- Daniel Bacigalupi – mastering assistant
- Chad Smith – art direction, design
- David Bean – photography
- Lorrie Turk – hair, make-up
- Celeste Winstead – wardrobe stylist
