= The Isaacs =

Bluegrass Southern gospel group

- Origin: Hendersonville, Tennessee, U.S.
- Genres: Southern gospel, Bluegrass, Country
- Years active: 1987–present
- Labels: Horizon, Gaither, K-Tel, Spring Hill, Isaacs House
- Members: Lily Isaacs; Ben Isaacs; Sonya Isaacs; Becky Isaacs
- Past members: John Bowman; Jimmy Yeary; Levi Bowman; Joe Isaacs; Jesse Stockman; Kevin Haynie; Nathan "Spikit" Fauscett; Thomas Wywrot; Tim Surrett
- Website: www.theisaacs.com

The Isaacs are a bluegrass Southern gospel music group consisting of mother Lily Isaacs (b. September 20, 1947), daughters Becky (b. Aug. 2, 1975) and Sonya Isaacs (b. July 22, 1974) and son Ben Isaacs (b. July 25, 1972), along with John Bowman (husband of Becky Isaacs) as an instrumentalist and songwriter. Joe Isaacs, formerly a singer and banjo player in the group, has left since his 1998 divorce from Lily Isaacs. He now does solo work on a far more localized level.

Baritone Tim Surrett, a former Kingsmen Quartet bass player and lead singer, was a member of The Isaacs from 1997 until 2002. Surrett was married to Sonya Isaacs during this time period. They were able to hire Jesse Stockman, a fiddle player from NM (who had been playing with the prestigious bluegrass band Doyle Lawson and Quicksilver) from 2005-2010. From 2006-2008, they hired Kevin Haynie to play banjo and guitar (Kevin is brother to Aubrey Haynie, fiddler extraordinaire who is an A-list session player in Nashville having played on hundreds of recordings). Kevin and Jesse were able to raise them to new heights instrumentally, as is evident on the "Live from Norway" DVD recorded when the two were in the group. With already unequaled vocal harmonies and now top tier instrumentalists, they recorded their first crossover album at StarStruck Studios (owned by Reba McEntire) in Nashville, with Mark Bright (Carrie Underwood, Rascal Flatts) as producer. This album garnered the group their first Dove Award. Thomas Wywrot was a member from 2008 to 2011. Sonya Isaacs' husband, Jimmy Yeary, took his place.

Currently, The Isaacs consists of Sonya Isaacs Yeary, Lily Isaacs, Becky Isaacs Bowman and Ben Isaacs. On August 10, 2021, they were invited to become members of the Grand Ole Opry. The group were also inducted into the Gospel Music Hall of Fame in 2021.

== History ==
The group's roots go back to 1971, when Joe and Lily Isaacs began a bluegrass band. Lily's parents are Polish Jewish Holocaust survivors. A few years after they were liberated from a concentration camp in Germany in 1945, her parents moved two-year old Lily to New York City, where, in 1958, she got a recording contract with Columbia Records and started performing in night clubs. While performing with his Kentucky band at the Gerde's Folk City, Joe met Lily and they were married in 1970. After Joe's brother died in an automobile accident, Joe and Lily became Christians, and the group began to perform only bluegrass gospel music. The group was initially named the Calvary Mountain Boys and later became Sacred Bluegrass before settling on the family name, the Isaacs. The group performed primarily on weekends, part-time, until 1986. As their son and daughters became old enough, they joined the group.

In 1992, the Isaacs moved from Morrow, Ohio, and settled in LaFollette, Tennessee.

== Recording ==
As the Calvary Mountain Boys and Sacred Bluegrass, the group recorded for Pine Tree and Old Homestead labels. As The Isaacs, they had more success with Morning Star Records and Horizon record labels.

== Discography ==
=== Albums ===
Year	Album	Peak chart positions				Producer	Label
Year	Album	Christian	Country	Heat	Bluegrass	Producer	Label
1988	Heartbeat						Harvest
1988	At Nightline						Harvest
1989	Family Chain						Harvest
1990	A Labor of Love						Morning Star
1990	Live at Hominy Valley						Morning Star
1991	20th Anniversary						Morning Star
1992	Live In Atlanta						Morning Star
1993	Songs to Remember						Morning Star
1993	Our Style						Morning Star
1994	Carry Me					Tony Rice	Horizon
1995	I Feel the Christmas Spirit						Horizon
1996	Live: Mountain Praise					Kim Ryan	Horizon
1997	Bridges					Ben Isaacs	Horizon
1997	The Very Best of The Isaacs						K-Tel
1998	Increase My Faith						Horizon
1999	Pieces of Our Past					Ben Isaacs	Horizon
2001	Stand Still					Ben Isaacs	Horizon
2002	Christmas Spirit					Ben Isaacs, Tony Rice	Horizon
2002	Eye of the Storm					Ben Isaacs	Horizon
2003	Songs of the Faith				14	Ben Isaacs	Horizon
2004	Heroes	19	45	31		Don Cook	Gaither
2005	Bluegrass Preserved						Horizon
2005	Radio Hits						Horizon
2005	Lily						Horizon
2005	Isaacs Bluegrass: A Cappella						Horizon
2006	Isaacs Bluegrass: Sonya						Horizon
2007	Big Sky	21	48	23		Mark Bright	Gaither
2009	Naturally: An Almost A Cappella Collection	25		12	1	Bill Gaither, Ben Isaacs	Spring Hill
2010	Christmas	31		5	2		Spring Hill
2011	Why Can't We	47		25	3		Spring Hill
2013	The Living Years	10			1		Gaither
2016	Nature's Symphony in 432	3					Isaacs House
2018	Favorites: Revisited By Request						Gaither
2020	Songs for the Times						Isaacs House
2021	The American Face						Isaacs House

=== Video ===
- 2001: Live: Mountain Praise (Horizon)
- 2001: Pieces of Our Past (Horizon)
- 2002: Stand Still (Horizon)
- 2004: The Best of the Isaacs: Favorites from the Homecoming Series (Gaither Music Group)
- 2008: Live From Norway (Gaither Music Group)

==== Gaither Homecoming video performances ====
- 1996: When All God's Singers Get Home "Carry Me"
- 1996: Sing Your Blues Away "I Have A Father Who Can"
- 1997: This is My Story "Look What God Gave Me"
- 1998: Singin' With The Saints "I'm Gonna Move
- 1998: All Day Singin' At The Dome "Satisfied" (Sonya)
- 1998: Atlanta Homecoming "Daddy Sang Bass" (Sonya),"That's All That Matters To Me"
- 1998: Down By The Tabernacle "The Tabernacle" (Sonya), "The Least I Can Do"
- 1999: Sweet Sweet Spirit "Reaping In The Spirit"
- 1999: Mountain Homecoming "Did You Ever Go Sailin'", "Go Rest High On That Mountain" (Sonya)
- 1999: I'll Meet You On The Mountain "I'll Meet You On The Mountain" (Sonya)
- 2001: Passin' The Faith Along "I Wanna Be Ready" (Sonya & Becky), "Stand Still"
- 2002: Let Freedom Ring "The Star-Spangled Banner", "It Is Well (Elisha's Song)"
- 2002: New Orleans Homecoming "He Understands My Tears"
- 2003: Going Home "The Prettiest Flowers Will Be Blooming"
- 2003: Heaven "O Come Angel Band"
- 2003: Red Rocks Homecoming "When The Rains Come" (Sonya)
- 2003: Rocky Mountain Homecoming "Sweet Holy Spirit"
- 2003: Gospel Bluegrass Homecoming Vol. 1 "Is Not This The Land Of Beulah?"
- 2003: Gospel Bluegrass Homecoming Vol. 2 "Another Soldier Down", "He Ain't Ever Done Me Nothin' But Good"
- 2004: We Will Stand "When I Survey The Wondrous Cross" (Sonya & Becky), "Hebrew Lullaby", "If That Don't Make You Wanna Go"
- 2005: Hymns "Wayfaring Stranger"
- 2005: Israel Homecoming "Halleluyah", "Shalom My Home"
- 2005: Jerusalem Homecoming "Moses, Take Your Shoes Off" (Sonya), "Walkin' In Jerusalem", "Heroes"
- 2005: Mark Lowry Goes To Hollywood "Ha Ha Hollywood", "Friend 'Til The End", "Peace Like A River"
- 2006: Canadian Homecoming "It Is Well With My Soul", "More Than Ever"
- 2006: Live From Toronto "Great Is Thy Reward/Orange Blossom Special"
- 2006: Christmas In South Africa "The Savior Of The World Has Come"
- 2007: Amazing Grace "I Need Thee Every Hour", "I Surrender All"
- 2007: Love Can Turn The World "Everything Is Going To Turn Out Right", "Hear My Song, Lord" (Sonya)
- 2007: South African Homecoming "Umbrella"
- 2008: Country Bluegrass Homecoming Vol. 1 "There Is Power In The Blood", "Walk On", "I Know Somebody Who Does", "All Prayed Up"
- 2008: Country Bluegrass Homecoming Vol. 2 "Barbie Bandaids"
- 2008: Homecoming Picnic "Sally Goodin/Wildwood Flower", "The Sweetest Song I Know" (Becky), "Mama's Teaching Angels How To Sing"
- 2009: A Campfire Homecoming "I Have Found A Way", "Orange Blossom Special"
- 2009: Nashville Homecoming "The One I'm Dying For"
- 2010: Better Day "Mama's Teaching Angels How To Sing"
- 2010: Count Your Blessings "No Shortage"
- 2011: Alaskan Homecoming "I've Got Joy"
- 2011: Majesty "Little Bit Of Heaven", "When I Lift Up My Head", "Healing Stream"
- 2011: Tent Revival Homecoming "I Believe In A Hill Called Mount Calvary"
- 2011: The Old Rugged Cross "Consider The Lilies" (Becky & Sonya)

== Awards and nominations ==
=== Grammy Awards ===
The Grammy Awards are presented annually by the National Academy of Recording Arts and Sciences of the United States for outstanding achievements in the music industry. The awards were established in 1958. The Isaacs have been nominated four times.

Year	Nominee / work	Award	Result
2016	Nature's Symphony In 432	Best Roots Gospel Album	Nominated
2018	Favorites: Revisited By Request	Best Roots Gospel Album	Nominated
2022	Songs for the Times	Best Roots Gospel Album	Nominated
2026	Praise & Worship: More Than A Hollow Hallelujah	Best Roots Gospel Album	Nominated
