= Pray Now =

Studio album by Karen Peck and New River
- Released: 2015
- Genre: Southern gospel

Karen Peck and New River chronology
| Revival (2013) | Pray Now (2015) |

Pray Now is a 2015 American southern Gospel album by Karen Peck and New River. It earned the group a Grammy Award nomination for Best Roots Gospel Album in 2016 and won the Southern Gospel Album of the Year at the 2015 Dove Awards.

== Track listing ==
| No. | Title | Length |
|---|---|---|
| 1. | "Calling" | 3:35 |
| 2. | "Pray Now" | 4:27 |
| 3. | "Hallelujah for the Cross" | 3:38 |
| 4. | "Love With All Your Heart" | 3:22 |
| 5. | "I Am Blessed" | 4:01 |
| 6. | "I’m Not Letting Go" | 3:11 |
| 7. | "I Choose Christ" | 3:53 |
| 8. | "Peace That Covers All the Pain" | 3:58 |
| 9. | "Redemption’s Holy Lamb" | 3:22 |
| 10. | "Lord, Send Your Angels" | 3:41 |
| 11. | "A Life That’s Good" | 3:25 |
| Total length: | | 40:43 |
