= Whatever the Road =

Studio album by Jason Crabb
- Released: September 18, 2015
- Genre: Contemporary Christian music
- Length: 37:34
- Label: Reunion
- Producer: Jason Ingram, Paul Mabury

Jason Crabb chronology
Jason Crabb (2009)	Whatever the Road (2015)

Whatever the Road is a studio album by Jason Crabb. Reunion Records released the album on September 18, 2015. Crabb worked with Jason Ingram and Paul Mabury, in the production of this album.

== Critical reception ==
Professional ratings
Review scores
Source	Rating
365 Days of Inspiring Media	4/5 stars
CCM Magazine	4.5/5 stars
The Christian Beat	4.5/5 stars

Awarding the album four and a half stars from CCM Magazine, Kevin Sparkman writes, "We certainly agree that the music is wonderful." DeWayne Hamby, reviewing the album for Charisma, writes, "one of Christian music's most distinctive vocalist continues to expand his audience with Whatever the Road...10 songs about Jesus, freedom, heaven, life and encouragement."

Jonathan Andre, rating the album four stars at 365 Days of Inspiring Media, states, "Whatever the Road is an example of an album that reminds us all what good quality singing is all about, and what it means production-wise to have the likes of Paul Mabury and Jason Ingram helping with an album." Giving the album four and a half stars for The Christian Beat, Sarah Baylor says, "Jason has crafted such a genuine and heartfelt record that is so incredibly relatable to each and every listener."

== Track listing ==
No.	Title	Length
1.	"Never Gonna Let Me Go"	3:22
2.	"Chance for a Miracle"	3:58
3.	"He Knows What He's Doing"	3:45
4.	"If I Shout"	3:47
5.	"He Won't Leave You There"	3:59
6.	"Home"	3:23
7.	"This Life for You"	3:53
8.	"It's a Good Life"	3:34
9.	"Opened Up My Eyes"	4:09
10.	"Mysterious Ways"	3:44
Total length:		37:34

== Charts ==
Chart (2015)	Peak position
US Billboard 200	165
US Christian Albums (Billboard)	3
