= If You Could Only See Me Now =

Single by T. Graham Brown

from the album Bumper to Bumper
- B-side: "We Tote the Note"
- Released: April 7, 1990
- Genre: Country
- Length: 3:10
- Label: Capitol
- Songwriters: Susan Longacre, Rick Giles
- Producers: Barry Beckett, T. Graham Brown

T. Graham Brown singles chronology
"Never Say Never" (1989)	"If You Could Only See Me Now" (1990)	"Don't Go Out" (1990)

"If You Could Only See Me Now" is a song written by Susan Longacre and Rick Giles, and recorded by American country music artist T. Graham Brown. It was released in April 1990 as the first single from the album Bumper to Bumper. The song reached number 6 on the Billboard Hot Country Singles & Tracks chart.

== Chart performance ==
Chart (1990)	Peak position
Canada Country Singles (RPM)	5
US Hot Country Songs (Billboard)	6

=== Year-end charts ===
Chart (1990)	Position
Canada Country Tracks (RPM)	68
US Country Songs (Billboard)	62
