= The Last Resort (T. Graham Brown song) =

Single by T. Graham Brown

from the album Brilliant Conversationalist
- B-side: "Sittin' on the Dock of the Bay"
- Released: January 23, 1988
- Genre: Country
- Length: 3:28
- Label: Capitol
- Songwriter(s): T. Graham Brown, Bruce Burch, Bruce Bouton
- Producer(s): Bud Logan

T. Graham Brown singles chronology
"She Couldn't Love Me Anymore" (1987)	"The Last Resort" (1988)	"Darlene" (1988)

"The Last Resort" is a song co-written and recorded by American country music artist T. Graham Brown. It was released in January 1988 as the third single from the album Brilliant Conversationalist. It reached number 4 on the Billboard Hot Country Singles & Tracks chart. The song was written by Brown, Bruce Burch, and Bruce Bouton.

== Charts ==
=== Weekly charts ===
Chart (1988)	Peak position
US Hot Country Songs (Billboard)	4
Canadian RPM Country Tracks	4

=== Year-end charts ===
Chart (1988)	Position
US Hot Country Songs (Billboard)	58
