= Nature's Symphony in 432 =

Studio album by The Isaacs
- Released: 2016
- Genre: Gospel

The Isaacs chronology
The Living Years (2013)	Nature's Symphony in 432 (2016)

Nature's Symphony in 432 is an album by The Isaacs. It earned the group a Grammy Award nomination for Best Roots Gospel Album.
