= Deeper Oceans =

Studio album by Joseph Habedank
- Released: 2018
- Genre: Gospel

Deeper Oceans is an album by Joseph Habedank. It received a Grammy Award nomination for Best Roots Gospel Album.
