= Brilliant Conversationalist =

Single by T. Graham Brown

from the album Brilliant Conversationalist
- B-side: "Takin' to It"
- Released: May 30, 1987
- Genre: Country
- Length: 3:02
- Label: Capitol
- Songwriter(s): John Hadley, Gary Nicholson
- Producer(s): Bud Logan

T. Graham Brown singles chronology
"Don't Go to Strangers" (1987)	"Brilliant Conversationalist" (1987)	"She Couldn't Love Me Anymore" (1987)

"Brilliant Conversationalist" is a song written by John Hadley, and Gary Nicholson, and recorded by American country music artist T. Graham Brown. It was released in May 1987 as the first single and title track from the album Brilliant Conversationalist. The song reached number nine on the Billboard Hot Country Singles & Tracks chart.

== Charts ==
Chart (1987)	Peak position
Canada Country Tracks (RPM)	4
US Hot Country Songs (Billboard)	9
