= I Tell It Like It Used to Be =

Single by T. Graham Brown

from the album I Tell It Like It Used to Be
- B-side: "Quittin' Time"
- Released: October 19, 1985
- Genre: Country
- Length: 3:00
- Label: Capitol
- Songwriter(s): Ron Hellard, Michael Garvin, Bucky Jones
- Producer(s): Bud Logan

T. Graham Brown singles chronology
"Drowning in Memories" (1985)	"I Tell It Like It Used to Be" (1985)	"I Wish That I Could Hurt That Way Again" (1986)

"I Tell It Like It Used to Be" is a song written by Ron Hellard, Michael Garvin, and Bucky Jones, and recorded by American country music artist T. Graham Brown. It was released in October 1985 as the first single and title track from the album I Tell It Like It Used to Be. It reached number 7 on Billboard Hot Country Singles & Tracks.

== Chart performance ==
Chart (1985–1986)	Peak position
US Hot Country Songs (Billboard)	7
