= Hell and High Water (T. Graham Brown song) =

Single by T. Graham Brown

from the album I Tell It Like It Used to Be
- B-side: "Don't Make a Liar Out of Me"
- Released: September 6, 1986
- Genre: Country
- Length: 3:11
- Label: Capitol
- Songwriter(s): T. Graham Brown, Alex Harvey
- Producer(s): Bud Logan

T. Graham Brown singles chronology
"I Wish That I Could Hurt That Way Again" (1986)	"Hell and High Water" (1986)	"Don't Go to Strangers" (1987)

Hell and High Water" is a song written by Alex Harvey and co-written and recorded by American country music artist T. Graham Brown. It was released in September 1986 as the third single from the album I Tell It Like It Used to Be. The song was Brown's third country hit and the first of three number ones on the country chart. The single went to number one for one week and spent a total of fifteen weeks on the country chart.

== Charts ==
=== Weekly charts ===
Chart (1986–1987)	Peak position
US Hot Country Songs (Billboard)	1
Canadian RPM Country Tracks	1

=== Year-end charts ===
Chart (1987)	Position
US Hot Country Songs (Billboard)	11
