= Come as You Were (album) =

Studio album by T. Graham Brown
- Released: 1988
- Genre: Country
- Length: 34:03
- Label: Capitol Nashville
- Producer: Ron Chancey

T. Graham Brown chronology
Brilliant Conversationalist (1987)	Come as You Were (1988)	Bumper to Bumper (1990)

Come as You Were is the third studio album by American country music artist T. Graham Brown. It was released in 1988 via Capitol Nashville. The includes the singles "Darlene", "Come as You Were" and "Never Say Never".

== Track listing ==
No.	Title	Writer(s)	Length
1.	"Darlene"	Mike Geiger, Woody Mullis, Ricky Ray Rector	3:22
2.	"This Wanting You"	T. Graham Brown, Bruce Burch, Bruce Bouton	2:54
3.	"I Read a Letter Today"	Brown	3:!7
4.	"She's Okay and I'm Okay"	Harlan Howard	3:20
5.	"The Time Machine"	Dennis Linde	2:40
6.	"Come as You Were"	Paul Craft	2:57
7.	"You Left the Water Running"	Oscar Franck, Rick Hall, Dan Penn	3:40
8.	"The Best Love I Never Had"	Kent Blazy, James Dowell, Sharon Kimbel	3:!6
9.	"Never Say Never"	Walt Aldridge, Tom Brasfield	3:07
10.	"I Believe When I Feel It"	Wayland Holyfield, Verlon Thompson	4:26

== Chart performance ==
Chart (1988)	Peak position
US Top Country Albums (Billboard)	22
