= Brilliant Conversationalist (album) =

Studio album by T. Graham Brown
- Released: May 30, 1987
- Genre: Country
- Length: 33:41
- Label: Capitol Nashville
- Producer: Bud Logan

T. Graham Brown chronology
I Tell It Like It Used to Be (1986)	Brilliant Conversationalist (1987)	Come as You Were (1988)

Brilliant Conversationalist is the second studio album by American country music artist T. Graham Brown. It was released in 1987 via Capitol Nashville. The album includes the singles "Brilliant Conversationalist", "She Couldn't Love Me Anymore" and "The Last Resort".

== Track listing ==
No.	Title	Writer(s)	Length
1.	"R. F. D. 30529"	T. Graham Brown, Gary Nicholson, Verlon Thompson	3:45
2.	"Save That Dress"	Kevin Welch, John Barlow Jarvis, Nicholson	2:20
3.	"Talkin' to It"	Brown, Buddy Blackmon, Vip Vipperman	2:50
4.	"Anything to Lose"	Dave Loggins	3:53
5.	"The Power of Love"	Nicholson, Don Cook	3:30
6.	"Brilliant Conversationalist"	John Hadley, Nicholson	2:56
7.	"She Couldn't Love Me Anymore"	Mike McGuire, Billb Henderson, Ray Maddox	3:13
8.	"Walk on Water"	Brown, John Jarrard, Nicholson	2:43
9.	"The Last Resort"	Brown, Bruce Burch, Bruce Bouton	3:26
10.	"Sittin' on the Dock of the Bay"	Otis Redding, Steve Cropper	4:29

== Chart performance ==
Chart (1987)	Peak position
US Top Country Albums (Billboard)	23
