= Wine into Water =

Studio album by T. Graham Brown
- Released: August 25, 1998
- Genre: Country
- Length: 40:54
- Label: Intersound
- Producer: Gary Nicholson; T. Graham Brown

T. Graham Brown chronology
| You Can't Take It with You (1991) | Wine into Water (1998) | The Next Right Thing (2003) |

Professional ratings
Review scores
| Source | Rating |
|---|---|
| AllMusic | 4.5/5 stars |

Wine Into Water is the sixth album by American country music singer T. Graham Brown. It was released August 25, 1998 by Intersound Records.

== Critical reception ==
Thom Owens of AllMusic says, "Wine Into Water is one of Brown's very best albums, not only because it finds him coming to terms with his own personal demons, but because it is so well-crafted."

Kimmy Wix of CMT quotes Brown, "This is the first time I've ever got to make an album exactly like I wanted," explains T. of his new Wine Into Water album, his first release in more than seven years."

== Track listing ==
| No. | Title | Writer(s) | Length |
|---|---|---|---|
| 1. | "Wine into Water" | T. Graham Brown; Ted Hewitt; Bruce Burch | 3:44 |
| 2. | "Never in a Million Years" | Daryl Burgess; Ty Tyler | 3:56 |
| 3. | "Happy Ever After" | Kevin Welch; Gary Nicholson | 3:13 |
| 4. | "Keep Me from Blowing Away" | Paul Craft | 3:04 |
| 5. | "Good Days Bad Days" | Walt Aldridge; Nicholson; John Jarrard | 4:11 |
| 6. | "Hide and Seek" | Nicholson; Al Anderson | 2:26 |
| 7. | "Memphis Women & Chicken" | Donnie Fritts; Dan Penn; Nicholson | 3:52 |
| 8. | "Accept My Love" | Glen Clark; Jeff Silbar | 3:50 |
| 9. | "A Better Word for Love" | Anderson; Nicholson | 3:26 |
| 10. | "Livin' on Love" | Nicholson; Craig Fuller | 4:16 |
| 11. | "How Do You Know" | Delaney Bramlett; Nicholson | 4:56 |
| Total length: | | | 40:54 |

- Track information and credits verified from the album's liner notes.

== Personnel ==
- T. Graham Brown – vocals
- James Pennebaker – acoustic guitar, electric guitar, pedal steel guitar
- Reese Wynans – Hammond B-3 organ, Wurlitzer, piano
- Chad Cromwell – drums
- Kenny Greenberg – acoustic guitar, electric guitar
- Michael Rhodes – bass
- Delaney Bramlett – National Resophonic and tremolo guitar, harmony vocals (Track 11)
- Kim Bramlett – harmony vocals (Track 11)
- Beth Nielsen Chapman – harmony vocals (Track 9)
- Ashley Cleveland – harmony vocals (Tracks 3, 10)
- Tom Flora – harmony vocals (Tracks 2, 5, 8)
- Jim Horn – saxophone (Tracks 7, 8, 10)
- Carl Marsh – strings (Tracks 1, 9)
- Delbert McClinton – harmonica (Track 7)
- Jonell Mosser – harmony vocals (Tracks 3, 10)
- Gary Nicholson – National Resophonic guitar (Track 7)
- Lee Roy Parnell – guitar (Tracks 5, 10)
- Al Anderson – acoustic guitar (Tracks 6, 9)
- Gary Pigg – harmony vocals (Tracks 2, 5, 8)
- Tom Roady – shaker (Tracks 2, 5, 10)
- Marty Stuart – mandolin (Track 4)
- Terry Townson – trumpet (Tracks 7, 8, 10)
- Steve Wariner – harmony vocals (Track 1)
- Bruce Bouton – steel (Tracks 1, 4)

== Production ==
- Gary Nicholson – Producer
- T. Graham Brown – Producer
- Toby Seay – Engineer
- Russ Martin – Engineer
- Randy LeRoy – Mastering
- Justin Neibank – Mixing
- Matt Andrews – Assistant Engineer
- Mark Meckel – Production Assistant
- Tom Bevins – Photography
- Cameron Chilton – Cover Design

== Charts ==
| Chart (1999) | Peak position |
|---|---|
| US Top Country Albums (Billboard) | 47 |
| US Heatseekers Albums (Billboard) | 38 |
