= I Tell It Like It Used to Be (album) =

Studio album by T. Graham Brown
- Released: 1986
- Studio: Muscle Shoals Sound Studios, Sheffield, Alabama, and Woodland Sound Studios, Nashville, Tennessee
- Genre: Country
- Length: 33:02
- Label: Capitol Nashville
- Producer: Bud Logan

T. Graham Brown chronology
I Tell It Like It Used to Be (1986)	Brilliant Conversationalist (1987)

I Tell It Like It Used to Be is the debut studio album by American country music artist T. Graham Brown. It was released in 1986 via Capitol Nashville. The album includes the singles "I Tell It Like It Used to Be", "I Wish That I Could Hurt That Way Again", "Hell and High Water" and "Don't Go to Strangers".

== Track listing ==
No.	Title	Writer(s)	Length
1.	"Say When"	Kevin Welch, Gary Nicholson	3:22
2.	"Don't Go to Strangers"	Russell Smith, J. D. Martin	4:00
3.	"Rock It, Billy"	Nicholson	3:08
4.	"She's Mine"	John Barlow Jarvis, Nicholson	2:31
5.	"I Wish That I Could Hurt That Way Again"	Curly Putman, Rafe Van Hoy, Don Cook	3:00
6.	"I Tell It Like It Used to Be"	Michael Garvin, Ron Hellard, Bucky Jones	2:58
7.	"You're Trying Too Hard"	T. Graham Brown, Nicholson	3:32
8.	"Hell and High Water"	Brown, Alex Harvey	3:12
9.	"Don't Make a Liar Out of Me"	Welch, Nicholson	3:03
10.	"Is There Anything I Can Do"	Wayland Holyfield, Nicholson	3:46

== Personnel ==
- Guitar: Brent Rowan. Steel guitar: Larry Sasser
- Bass: David Hood, Joe Osborn
- Keyboards: John Barlow Jarvis, Steve Nathan, Randy McCormick
- Drums: Clay Caire, Roger Hawkins
- Saxophone: Gary Armstrong, Barry Green, Don Jackson, Harvey Thompson
- Horns: Terry Mead, The Muscle Shoals Horns
- Backing Vocals – Cindy Walker, Wendy Suits, Dennis Wilson

== Chart performance ==
Chart (1986)	Peak position
US Top Country Albums (Billboard)	15
