= Karen Peck and New River =

American musical group

- Origin: Gainesville, Georgia, U.S.
- Genre: Southern gospel
- Years active: 1991–present
- Label: Daywind
- Members: Karen Peck-Gooch; Susan Peck-Jackson; Kari Gooch; Matthew Gooch; Grant Gibson
- Website: karenpeckandnewriver.com

Karen Peck and New River is a southern gospel mixed group based in Gainesville, Georgia.

== Music career ==
The youngest of three daughters, Karen was exposed to the traditional sounds of gospel music at a very early age. Her parents often took Karen and her sisters, Susan and Sandra, to the all-night sings in Atlanta. These concerts left an indelible mark on the youngsters who made a pact to someday share a musical ministry of their own.

One of the groups often featured at the Atlanta concerts was The Lefevres, who later became known as The Nelons. Karen had aspirations of singing with the Nelons. In 1981, Karen was invited to travel with them, and remained in the group for ten years.

Finally in 1991, Karen and her sister, Susan, with Karen's husband Rickey, organized the musical entourage of Karen Peck and New River. The New River Band consisted of Danny Crawford (piano), Craig Nobles (piano), David Owens (bass guitar), among other guys until the band was dropped in 1999 and the group became a vocal trio.

Karen Peck and New River have garnered 11 Favorite Soprano Fan Awards from the readers of The Singing News Magazine, Southern Gospel Music's leading fan and trade publication. Karen and group have also received many awards from other magazine publications and Internet publications. They have had five consecutive No. 1 songs in southern gospel music.

The group have appeared on such prestigious stages as The Grand Ole Opry, The Gaither Homecoming concerts, Opryland Theme Park, Dollywood and Six Flags Over Georgia and beyond. Over the past decade, they have been featured on many television networks, with appearances on programs such as TBN's Praise The Lord, and the Grand Ole Opry Live. The group has enjoyed many honors and accolades.

Their album "Journey of Joy" received a Grammy nomination for 2008. "Journey of Joy" was also nominated for three Dove Awards. This album has three consecutive No. 1 songs: "Hey", "Last Night", and "Whispered Prayers". A few of their other popular hits include: "Why Can't All God's Children Get Along", "I Want to Thank You", "Hold Me While I Cry", "Just One Touch", "I Wanna Know How It Feels", "God Likes To Work", "Daddy’s Home", "When Jesus Passes By", "God Still Answers Prayer", and "Christian In The House". Additionally, the group’s number one hit, "Four Days Late", was also named Song of the Year by readers of The Singing New Magazine in 2001 and the SGMA Awards and continues to be a favorite among audiences.

In September 2008, Daywind released Ephesians One. The album, featured the No. 1 song "I Want To Thank You", which was nominated for a Grammy in 2009. In 2009, Daywind released their album "No Worries, and in 2010, the DVD/CD "Live at Oak Tree" was nominated for a 2010 Grammy Award (their third Grammy nomination). July 2011 brought the release of "Reach Out". "Each time we go into the studio to record a new album," Karen shares, "we're at a different place in our walk with Christ than the last time we prepared for a recording. Therefore, obviously, each recording pulls at a different heart string, yet the message of hope is always present. That's what life in Christ is all about. As a result of various circumstances each of us have faced over the past years, we're at a point in our lives where we realize that anything we achieve or accomplish is all because of Christ. It is an honor to serve Him."

Today the New River team consists vocally of Karen Peck Gooch, Kari Gooch Baucom, Susan Peck Jackson, Grant Gibson, and Matthew Gooch on guitar. Additionally, Rickey Gooch serves as the group's road manager and sound technician. David, Susan's spouse, founded and is the owner of the Jackson Steel Guitar Company.

== Members ==
=== Current members ===
- Karen Peck Gooch (born March 12, 1960), soprano, 1991–present
- Susan Peck Jackson (born February 4, 1957), alto (Karen's sister), 1991–present
- Rickey Gooch, travel manager and sound technician (Karen's husband), 1991–present
- Kari Gooch, 2nd soprano/alto, 2013–present
- Grant Gibson, lead, 2018–present
- Matthew Gooch, guitar, 2010-present

=== Former members ===
- David White (tenor) 1991–1993, 1994–1999
- David Owen (bass guitar) 1991–1999
- Danny Crawford (piano) 1991–1993
- Craig Nobles (piano) 1993–1999
- Eric Morris (tenor) 1993–1994
- John Rowsey (tenor) 1999–2002
- Jason Jackson (tenor) 2002–2004
- Paul Lancaster (tenor) 2004
- Devin McGlamery (tenor) 2004–2009
- Jeff Hawes, tenor, 2010–2015
- Ricky Braddy 2015–2017

== Discography ==
- 1991: Karen Peck and New River
- 1992: Restoration
- 1993: Daddy's Home
- 1994: Live From The Alabama Theatre
- 1995: Unlimited
- 1996: Right on Time
- 1997: Makin' a Difference
- 1999: Turn It Loose
- 2000: A Taste of Grace
- 2001: Triumph
- 2003: For His Glory
- 2004: Faith, Hope, & Love
- 2005: Good to Be Free
- 2007: Journey of Joy
- 2008: Ephesians One
- 2009: No Worries
- 2010: Live at Oak Tree
- 2011: Reach Out
- 2012: Georgia Mountain Christmas
- 2013: Revival
- 2015: Pray Now
- 2017: Hope For All Nations
- 2020: Lift His Name
- 2022: 2:22
- 2025: Good Answers

=== Karen Peck Solo albums ===
- 1989: My Father's Words
- 1996: Carry Faith
- 2012: How You Walk the Miles

=== Compilations ===
- 2000: A Southern Gospel Decade
- 2007: The Best of Karen Peck and New River
- 2016: 25 Anniversary – Collectors Edition

=== Singles ===
Singing News Magazine Top 40 Singles

- 1992: "Why Can't All God's Children Get Along" No. 2
- 1993: "God Answers Prayer" No. 4
- 1993: "Rain & Shine" No. 2
- 1993: "When Jesus Passes By" No. 2
- 1993: "Whenever the Wind Blows" No. 22
- 1994: "Daddy's Home" No. 6
- 1994: "He's Sending Miracles" No. 6
- 1995: "God Likes to Work" No. 1
- 1996: "Ten Thousand Angels Cried" No. 13
- 1999: "Christian in the House" No. 33
- 1999: "UFO" No. 19
- 2001: "Four Days Late" No. 1
- 2001: "The Truth Is" No. 24
- 2002: "I Wanna Know How It Feels" No. 3
- 2003: "Now That You Know" No. 14
- 2003: "Rejoice in the Lord" No. 27
- 2004: "That's Why They Call It Grace" No. 6
- 2005: "Get About God's Business" No. 11
- 2005: "Just One Touch" No. 3
- 2006: "River of Peace" No. 8
- 2006: "Hold Me While I Cry" No. 1
- 2007: "Last Night" No. 1
- 2008: "Hey" No. 1
- 2008: "Whispered Prayers" No. 1
- 2009: "I Want to Thank You" No. 1
- 2009: "Ephesians Chapter One" No. 9
- 2010: "Why Can't All God's Children Get Along" No. 2
- 2010: "Why Should I Worry" No. 4
- 2011: "On the Banks of the Promised Land" No. 1
- 2011: "Special Love" No. 8
- 2012: "Mighty Big God" No. 1
- 2012: "Good Things Are Happening" No. 2
- 2013: "Sustaining Grace" No. 8
- 2014: "Revival" No. 1
- 2014: "Finish Well" No. 1
- 2015: "Everybody's Going Through Something" No. 2
- 2015: "Pray Now" No. 1
- 2016: "I Am Blessed" No. 2
- 2017: "Calling" No. 1

== Awards ==
Absolutely Gospel (SGN) Music Award

- 2002: Progressive Song of the Year – "Four Days Late"
- 2002: Song of the Year – "Four Days Late"
- 2003: Female Vocalist of the Year
- 2004: Progressive Song of the Year – "That's Why They Call It Grace"
- 2006: Progressive Album of the Year – Good To Be Free
- 2008: Progressive Album of the Year – Journey of Joy
- 2008: Progressive Song of the Year – "Last Night"
- 2009: Country/Bluegrass Song of the Year – "Hey"
- 2010: Country Song of the Year – "I Want to Thank You"
- 2010: Fan Favorite Artist of the Year
- 2010: Progressive Album of the Year – No Worries
- 2010: Song of the Year – "I Want to Thank You"
- 2011: Fan Favorite Artist of the Year
- 2011: Female Vocalist of the Year
- 2011: Mixed Group of the Year
- 2011: Progressive Song of the Year – "Why Can't All God's Children Get Along"
- 2012: Fan Favorite Artist of the Year
- 2012: Mixed Group of the Year
- 2012: Progressive Song of the Year – "On the Banks of the Promised Land"
- 2012: Song of the Year – "On the Banks of the Promised Land"
- 2012: Susan Unthank Memorial Award – Karen Peck Gooch
- 2013: Album of the Year – How You Walk the Miles (Karen Peck solo recording)
- 2013: Song of the Year – "Mighty Big God"

Singing News Fan Awards

- 1986: Favorite Soprano - Karen Peck (with the Nelons)
- 1987: Favorite Soprano - Karen Peck (with the Nelons)
- 1988: Favorite Soprano - Karen Peck (with the Nelons)
- 1989: Favorite Soprano - Karen Peck Gooch (with the Nelons)
- 1990: Favorite Soprano - Karen Peck Gooch (with the Nelons)
- 1991: Favorite Soprano - Karen Peck Gooch
- 1992: Favorite Soprano - Karen Peck Gooch
- 1993: Favorite Soprano - Karen Peck Gooch
- 1994: Favorite Soprano - Karen Peck Gooch
- 1995: Favorite Soprano - Karen Peck Gooch
- 1996: Favorite Soprano - Karen Peck Gooch
- 2001: Favorite Song - "Four Days Late"
- 2020: Favorite Young Artist - Kari Gooch
- 2022: Favorite Soprano - Karen Peck Gooch
- 2023: Favorite Soprano - Karen Peck Gooch

Diamond Awards

- 1992: Sunrise Award Recipient
- 2005: Trio of the Year
- 2009: Song of the Year – "Whispered Prayers"
- 2009: Album of the Year – Ephesians One
- 2009: Mixed Group of the Year

Southern Gospel Music Fan Fair Awards

- 2001: Song of the year – "Four Days Late"
- 2002: Female Vocalist of the Year
- 2004/05/06: Female Vocalist of the Year
- 2007: Favorite Alto – Susan Peck Jackson
- 2007: Favorite Soprano
- 2007: Song of the Year – "Hold Me While I Cry"
- 2007: Trio of the Year
- 2009: Favorite Soprano
- 2009: Trio of the Year

Gospel Music Association Hall of Fame

- 2016 Inductee - Karen Peck Gooch (as a member of the Nelons)
- 2018 Inductee- Karen Peck Gooch (individually)

Southern Gospel Music Association Hall of Fame

- 2021 Inductee - Karen Peck Gooch
