= Darlene (T. Graham Brown song) =

Single by T. Graham Brown

from the album Come as You Were
- B-side: "Best Love I Ever Had"
- Released: May 1988
- Genre: Country
- Length: 3:20
- Label: Capitol
- Songwriter(s): Mike Geiger; Woody Mullis; Ricky Ray Rector
- Producer(s): Ron Chancey

T. Graham Brown singles chronology
"The Last Resort" (1988)	"Darlene" (1988)	"Come as You Were" (1988)

"Darlene" is a song written by Mike Geiger, Woody Mullis, and Ricky Ray Rector, and recorded by American country music artist T. Graham Brown. It was released in May 1988 as the first single from the album Come as You Were. The song was Brown's third and final number one on the country chart. The single went to number one for one week and spent a total of fourteen weeks on the country chart.

== Charts ==
=== Weekly charts ===
Chart (1988)	Peak position
US Hot Country Songs (Billboard)	1
Canadian RPM Country Tracks	1

=== Year-end charts ===
Chart (1988)	Position
Canadian RPM Country Tracks	21
US Hot Country Songs (Billboard)	12
