= Bumper to Bumper (T. Graham Brown album) =

Studio album by T. Graham Brown
- Released: May 15, 1990
- Recorded: 1989
- Genre: Country
- Length: 41:29
- Label: Capitol Nashville
- Producer: Barry Beckett, T. Graham Brown

T. Graham Brown chronology
Come as You Were (1988)	Bumper to Bumper (1990)	You Can't Take It with You (1991)

Bumper to Bumper is the fourth studio album by American country music artist T. Graham Brown. It was released in 1990 via Capitol Nashville. The includes the singles "If You Could Only See Me Now", "Moonshadow Road" and "I'm Sending One Up for You".

== Track listing ==
No.	Title	Writer(s)	Length
1.	"Moonshadow Road"	T. Graham Brown, Gary Nocholson, Verlon Thompson	3:43
2.	"You Can't Make Her Love You"	Jerry Ward	3:41
3.	"I'm Expecting Miracles"	Brown, Nicholson, Thompson	3:12
4.	"If You Could Only See Me Now"	Susan Longacre, Rick Giles	3:06
5.	"I'm Sending One Up for You"	Brown, Nicholson, Nigel Kennedy	3:44
6.	"I've Been Loving You Too Long"	Otis Redding, Jerry Butler	3:13
7.	"Eyes Wide Open"	Ward	4:23
8.	"Bring a Change"	Brown, Bruce Burch, Vip Vipperman	3:54
9.	"Blues of the Month Club"	Nicholson, Dan Penn, Carson Whitsett	5:05
10.	"For Real"	Brown, Burch	3:30
11.	"We Tote the Note"	Brown, Nicholson, Penn	3:39

== Chart performance ==
Chart (1990)	Peak position
US Top Country Albums (Billboard)	35
