= Jason Crabb =

American musician (born 1977)

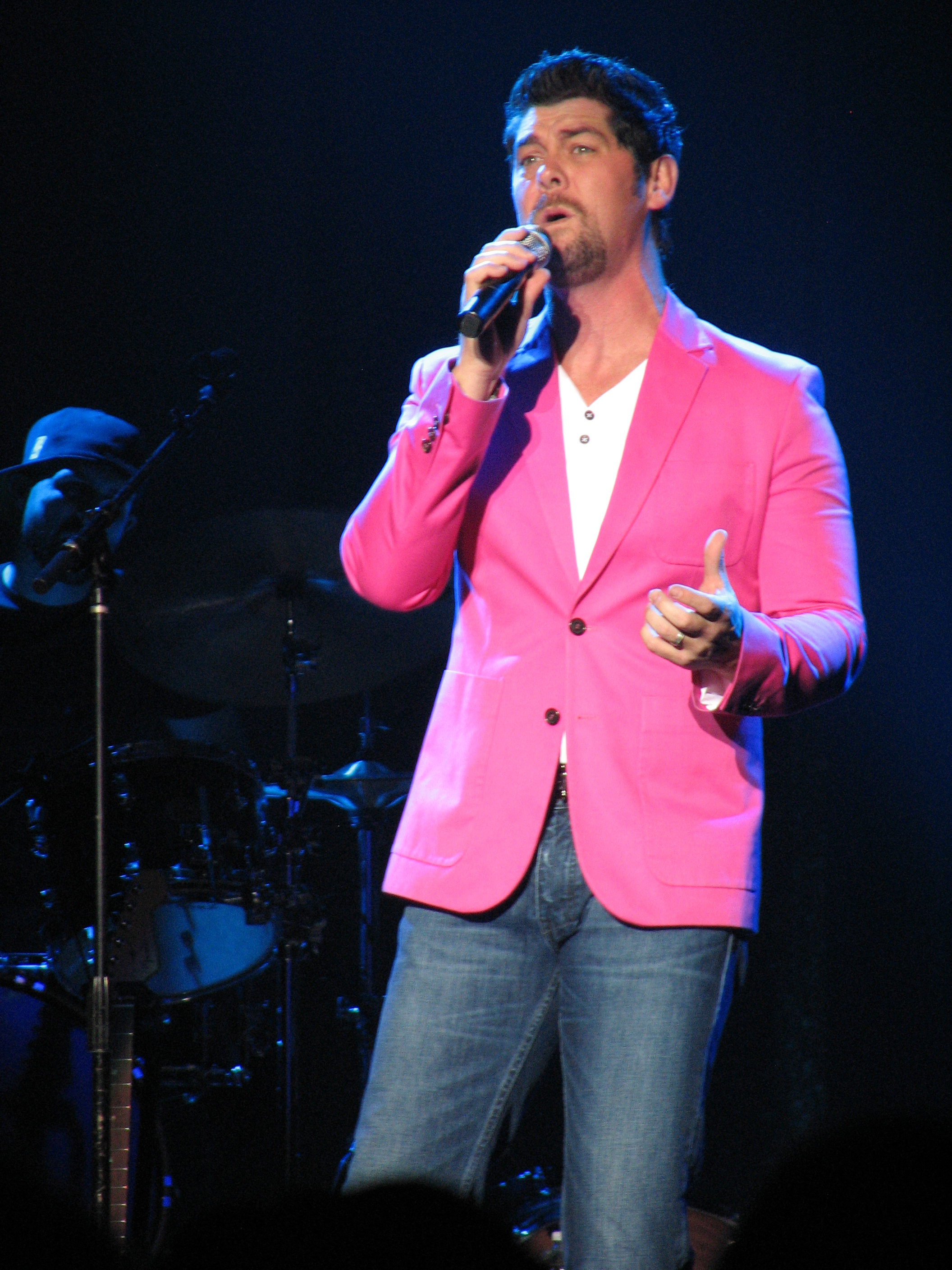
- Crabb performing in 2013

Background information
- Born: Jason Douglas Crabb; March 3, 1977 (age 49); Beaver Dam, Kentucky, U.S.
- Genres: Christian, southern gospel, gospel
- Occupations: Singer, record producer
- Instruments: Vocals, guitar
- Years active: 1996–present
- Label: Spring Hill Music Group
- Member of: The Crabb Family
- Website: www.jasoncrabbmusic.com

Jason Crabb (born March 3, 1977) is an American Christian music singer and musician. He was previously the lead vocalist for the group The Crabb Family.

Crabb was voted "Favorite Male Vocalist" at the inaugural Harmony Honors Awards and "Favorite Young Artist" at the 2000 Singing News Fan Awards. In 2004, he was voted 2004 Gospel Music Male Vocalist of the Year. He has been nominated for many other awards during his career. He has worked extensively with the Brooklyn Tabernacle Choir as a soloist.

== Career ==
The Crabb Family retired as a group in 2007 to go their separate ways.

As a solo artist, he was signed to Spring Hill Music Group. His self-titled debut solo album was released on June 30, 2009. It reached No. 62 on the Billboard 200, No. 2 on the Billboard Christian albums chart, and No. 1 on Nielsen SoundScan's Southern Gospel albums chart. The album won a 2010 Grammy award for Best Southern/Country/Bluegrass Gospel Album. The album was also nominated for a Dove Award for Country Album of the Year at the 41st GMA Dove Awards. On September 28, 2010, Spring Hill Music Group released Jason's second solo project, a Christmas album titled Because It's Christmas. In 2011, the family group reunited to record a new album, along with a concert tour from the end of 2011 through the beginning of 2012.

In October 2012, Crabb appeared on Marie Osmond's Hallmark Channel show, Marie. In November, he was featured on Fox News Channel with anchor Kelly Wright for a special segment called "Beyond The Dream". During the Christmas 2012 season, Jason teamed up with Sandi Patty for A Christmas Celebration Tour. One of the concerts was held in New York to benefit Hurricane Sandy victims.

Crabb's next project, Love is Stronger, was released on March 12, 2013. It was produced by Jay DeMarcus (Rascal Flatts), Ed Cash and Wayne Haun. The album features a special guest appearance by Kari Jobe.

Crabb is signed to Provident Label Group, a division of Sony Music Entertainment. His first studio album, Whatever the Road, with Reunion Records, was released September 18, 2015.

== Personal life ==
Jason and his wife, Shellye, have two daughters.

== Discography ==
Year	Album details	Chart peak			Grammy awards
Year	Album details	US	Christian	Holiday	Grammy awards
2009	Jason Crabb: Released: June 30, 2009; Label: Spring Hill Music Group; Format: CD	62	2	—	Winner; Best Southern, Country, or Bluegrass Gospel Album
2010	Because It's Christmas: Released: September 28, 2010; Label: Spring Hill Music Group; Format: CD	—	39	6	
2013	Love Is Stronger: Release Date: March 12, 2013; Label: Gaither Music Group; Format: CD	94	8	—	
2015	Whatever the Road: Release Date: September 18, 2015; Label: Reunion Records; Format: CD	165	3	—	
2018	Unexpected: Release Date: April 20, 2018	—	12	—	Winner; Best Roots Gospel Album
"—" denotes releases that did not chart					

Compilations

- 2015: Through the Fire: The Best of Jason Crabb

Appearances on other albums

- 2000: Testament, Talley Trio; "Searchin'"
- 2003: Roads That I've Traveled, Gerald Crabb; "Through the Fire"
- 2004: Hymns from My Heart, Delores Winans; "Oh, I Want to See Him"
- 2005: I'm Amazed...Live, Brooklyn Tabernacle Choir; "I'm Amazed"
- 2005: Torch: A Live Celebration of Southern Gospel's Next Generation, various artists; "Midnight Cry"
- 2006: Bless the Broken Road: The Duets Album, Selah; "Ain't No Grave"
- 2006: Look at Me Now, Wess Morgan; "He Stepped In"
- 2006: Remembering The Greats, various artists; "The Lighthouse"
- 2009: Glory Revealed II, Dixie Melody Boys; "God Will Hear Your Prayer"
- 2010: Better Day, Gaither Vocal Band; "Somebody Like Me", "Daystar (Shine Down on Me)"
- 2011: The Call Is Still The Same, Gaither Vocal Band; "Somebody Like Me", "Daystar (Shine Down on Me)"
- 2012: Working on a Building, various artists; "On The Other Side", "All Hail The Power"
- 2013: Like Father, Like Son, James and Jeff Easter; "I've Got No Rocks to Throw" with father Gerald Crabb
- 2014: Ready to Fly, Jamie Grace; "Fighter (Acoustic)"
- 2014: Kirk Cameron's Saving Christmas [Soundtrack]; "Let Us Adore"
- 2015: Forever Changed, T. Graham Brown; "Soul Talk", "People Get Ready"
- 2015: Help 2.0, Erica Campbell; "I'm a Fan"

== Video ==
- 2011: The Song Lives On Live

Gaither Homecoming video solo performances

- 2001: What A Time!; "Please Forgive Me" (Crabb Family)
- 2001: Journey to the Sky; "Because I Love Him"
- 2002: New Orleans Homecoming; "Through the Fire" (Crabb Family)
- 2004: We Will Stand; "Until I Found the Lord"
- 2007: How Great Thou Art; "I'd Rather Have Jesus" (Crabb Family)
- 2008: Country Bluegrass Homecoming Vol. 1; "I Sure Miss You"
- 2008: Rock of Ages; "The Blood Will Never Lose Its Power"
- 2010: Count Your Blessings; "Ellsworth", "Please Forgive Me"
- 2011: Tent Revival Homecoming; "Take My Hand, Precious Lord"
- 2011: Old Rugged Cross; "Sometimes I Cry"
- 2021: Glorious Church (filmed in 2001); "That's No Mountain" (Crabb Family)
- 2023: Power In The Blood; "The Blood Will Never Lose Its Power", "I've Never Been This Homesick Before"
- 2023: Hallelujah Homecoming; "What A Friend We Have In Jesus" (with Ann Downing and Gene McDonald), "The Baptism of Jesse Taylor" (with the Gaither Vocal Band and Marshall Hall)
- 2025: Sweet Hymns of Fellowship; "Pass Me Not, O Gentle Savior"

== Filmography ==
Year	Title	Role	Notes
2006–	Praise the Lord	Frequent host	TBN's flagship program
2007	Christian Artist Talent Search	Himself/host	INSP series
2012	Marie	Himself	Episode: "Kellie Martin"
2014	John Hagee Today	Himself/host	1 episode
2015	Uncommon	Pastor Tom Roberts	
2015	Welcome to Inspiration	Jason Crabb	

== Awards and nominations ==
Crabb has received several awards and nominations, both as part of a group and as a solo artist.

=== GMA Dove Awards ===
Year	Category	Result
2005	Male Vocalist of the Year	Nominated
2006	Male Vocalist of the Year	Nominated
2010	Song of the Year for "Somebody Like Me"	Nominated
2010	Artist of the Year	Nominated
2010	Male Vocalist of the Year	Nominated
2010	Country Recorded Song of the Year for "Somebody Like Me"	Won
2010	Country Album of the Year for Jason Crabb	Nominated
2011	Song of the Year for "Sometimes I Cry"	Won
2011	Artist of the Year	Nominated
2011	Male Vocalist of the Year	Nominated
2011	Inspirational Recorded Song of the Year for "Joseph"	Won
2011	Traditional Gospel Recorded Song of the Year for "Go Tell It on the Mountain"	Won
2012	Song of the Year for "Who Am I"	Nominated
2012	Artist of the Year	Won
2012	Male Vocalist of the Year	Won
2012	Contemporary Gospel Recorded Song of the Year for "I'd Rather Have Jesus"	Nominated
2012	Country Recorded Song of the Year for "Why Me"	Nominated
2012	Southern Gospel Album of the Year for "The Song Lives On"	Nominated
2012	Traditional Gospel Recorded Song of the Year for "I Saw the Light"	Nominated
2012	Long Form Music Video of the Year for "The Song Lives On"	Nominated
2013	Song of the Year for "What the Blood Is For"	Nominated
2013	Country Song of the Year for "God's Up to Something"	Nominated
2013	Inspirational Album of the Year for Love Is Stronger	Won
2013	Inspirational Recorded Song of the Year for "Satisfied"	Won
2013	Southern Gospel Recorded Song of the Year for "What the Blood Is For"	Won
2014	Southern Gospel Recorded Song of the Year for "Love Is Stronger"	Nominated
2014	Country Album of the Year for Surrender – Adam Crabb (for co-producing)	Nominated

=== Grammy Awards ===
Year	Category	Result
2010	Best Southern/Country/Bluegrass Gospel Album for Jason Crabb	Won
2016	Grammy Award for Best Contemporary Christian Music Album for "Whatever the Road”	Nominated
2019	Best Roots Gospel Album for Unexpected	Won
