= Don't Go to Strangers (T. Graham Brown song) =

Single by T. Graham Brown

from the album I Tell It Like It Used to Be
- B-side: "Rock It, Billy"
- Released: January 31, 1987
- Genre: Country
- Length: 4:03
- Label: Capitol
- Songwriters: Russell Smith, J.D. Martin
- Producer: Bud Logan

T. Graham Brown singles chronology
"Hell and High Water" (1986)	"Don't Go to Strangers" (1987)	"Brilliant Conversationalist" (1987)

"Don't Go to Strangers" is a song written by Russell Smith and J.D. Martin, and recorded by American country music artist T. Graham Brown. It was released in January 1987 as the fourth single from the album I Tell It Like It Used to Be. The song was Brown's second number one on the country chart. The single went to number one for one week and spent a total of fourteen weeks on the country chart.

== Charts ==
=== Weekly charts ===
Chart (1987)	Peak position
US Hot Country Songs (Billboard)	1
Canadian RPM Country Tracks	1

=== Year-end charts ===
Chart (1987)	Position
US Hot Country Songs (Billboard)	20
