= Aristocrat of Bands =

Marching band of Tennessee State University

Tennessee State University's marching band is known as the Aristocrat of Bands (AOB).

== History ==
The band, much like the stage band of the time known as the Jazz Collegians of Tennessee State University, were primarily student led organizations when they first emerged after the school's founding. Although band was offered as a class, there was no full-time director on staff in the early decades of the band’s formation, leaving the task to other faculty members as a supervisory role.

In 1946, J.D. “Chick” Chavis, a well-known musician and music educator in the Nashville area, started the organization with 100 pieces. Originally titled as "the Marching 100", the name "Aristocrat of Bands" was given by a sportscaster at a National Football League (NFL) game.

== Historical accomplishments ==
In 1955, the band was the first historically black college or university (HBCU) band to appear on national television with their performance at the Chicago Bears versus Los Angeles Rams NFL game. In 1961, they performed for the inauguration of President John F. Kennedy making them the first historically black college or university to perform at a presidential inauguration. The band has been invited and performed in Asia, Africa, North America and Europe. The band was featured in the inaugural Honda Battle of the Bands, held in Atlanta. The band was also named in 2002 the official band of the Tennessee Titans, making them the first HBCU to be named as an official band for an NFL team. They played in the 2022 Rose Parade. On November 15, 2022 the Aristocrat of Bands became the first marching band in history to be nominated for a Grammy.

The Tennessee State University Aristocrat of Bands won a Grammy for Best Roots Gospel Album and Best Spoken Word Album during the 65th Annual Grammy Awards on February 5, 2023. TSU’s marching band won for their albums “The Urban Hymnal” and “The Poet Who Say By The Door.”

== Discography ==
- The Urban Hymnal (2022)
