= The Booth Brothers =

Southern Gospel Trio

- Origin: Detroit, Michigan, United States
- Genre: Southern gospel
- Instrument: Vocals
- Years active: 1950s–1963, 1990–present
- Labels: MorningStar, Elim, Sonlite, Spring Hill, Daywind, Gaither Music Group, StowTown
- Members: Michael Booth; Ronnie Booth; Buddy Mullins
- Past members: Ron Booth Sr.; Joseph Smith; Jim Brady; Paul Lancaster
- Website: www.boothbrothers.com

The Booth Brothers is an American southern gospel vocal trio. It was originally formed in 1957 by four brothers but disbanded in 1963. It was reformed in 1990 by one of the original members, Ron Booth, with two of his sons, Michael and Ronnie Booth. Ron Booth retired in 1998, and was replaced by Joseph Smith, who was in turn replaced by Jim Brady, followed by Paul Lancaster. In June 2021, it was announced that Ronnie Booth would be leaving the group and be succeeded by former Gaither Vocal Band lead singer Buddy Mullins.

== Group history ==
The Booth Brothers was initially formed in the 1950s by Ron Booth Sr. with his brothers Charles, James, and Wallace, after they moved to Detroit. However, Ron decided to disband the group in 1963 when he joined the Toney Brothers.

In 1990, Ron's youngest son, Michael (b. October 8, 1971), decided to revive the group with his brother Ronnie II (b. June 28, 1965), and his father. They started performing and touring around Florida and recorded several albums. In 1998, Ron decided to retire and the remaining brothers started looking for a replacement. They recorded several albums with Joseph Smith, who was later replaced by Jim Brady (b. May 19, 1970). Brady remained with them until August 24, 2014, at which point he was replaced by Paul Lancaster (b. February 23, 1968). On June 4, 2021, Ronnie Booth left the group, he would be leaving the road to enjoy his family and grandchildren, and Buddy Mullins would join the group as the lead singer. Brady returned on January 7, 2022, only to leave again, at which point the returning Ronnie Booth filled the baritone position on December 16, 2025.

== Original members ==
- Ron Booth Sr. – tenor
- Charles Booth – lead
- James Booth – baritone
- Wallace Booth – bass

== Members ==
=== Line-ups ===
1990–1998 (as the Booth Brothers)	1998–2002	2002–2014
Michael Booth – tenor; Ronnie Booth – lead; Ron Booth Sr. – baritone	Michael Booth – tenor; Ronnie Booth – lead; Joseph Smith – baritone	Michael Booth – tenor; Ronnie Booth – lead; Jim Brady – baritone
2014–2021	2021–2022	2022–2025
Michael Booth – tenor; Ronnie Booth – lead; Paul Lancaster – baritone	Michael Booth – tenor; Buddy Mullins – lead; Paul Lancaster – baritone	Michael Booth – tenor; Buddy Mullins – lead; Jim Brady – baritone
2025–present
Michael Booth – tenor; Buddy Mullins – lead; Ronnie Booth – baritone

=== Current members ===
- Michael Booth (Tenor) (1990–present)
- Buddy Mullins (Lead) (2021–present)
- Ronnie Booth (Baritone) (1990–2021, 2025–present)

=== Former members ===
- Ron Booth Sr. (Baritone) (1990–1998)
- Joseph Smith (Baritone) (1998–2002)
- Jim Brady (Baritone) (2002–2014, 2022–2025)
- Paul Lancaster (Baritone) (2014–2022)

== 2013 Quartet members ==
- Michael Booth – tenor
- Ronnie Booth – lead
- Jim Brady – baritone
- Gene McDonald – bass
- Nick Bruno - piano

== Discography ==
=== Studio albums ===
- 1993: Beyond the Cross
- 1996: Praise God Anyhow
- 1996: One of His Own
- 1998: Will You Love Jesus More
- 1999: Beyond the Cross [re-issue]
- 1999: Walkin' on the Good Side
- 1999: Treasure These Moments, Volumes I & II
- 1999: Pure and Simple, Volume I
- 2000: Pure and Simple, Volume II
- 2000: This Stage of Grace
- 2001: 10th Anniversary Classic Collection
- 2002: The Booth Brothers Classic Collection Volume II
- 2003: The Booth Brothers
- 2004: Pure Southern Gospel
- 2005: The Blind Man Saw It All
- 2005: The Booth Brothers Christmas
- 2006: Harmony
- 2006: Hymns, Pure and Simple
- 2007: Trails of Paradise
- 2007: Carry On
- 2008: Room for More
- 2009: 09
- 2010: Declaration
- 2011: Let It Be Known
- 2012: The Best of the Booth Brothers [Gaither Compilation]
- 2012: Requested
- 2012: A Tribute to the Songs of Bill and Gloria Gaither
- 2014: Isaiah 12:2
- 2015: Still
- 2016: Between Here And Heaven
- 2019: Country Roads: Country And Inspirational Favorites
- 2020: Brotherhood - Recorded with Ernie Haase & Signature Sound
- 2021: Take Another Step
- 2022: Speak Jesus
- 2024: Generations - Recorded with Ron and Charles Booth (via archived vocals)

=== Live Album ===
- 2003: Live in Lakeland
- 2009: Live at Oak Tree
- 2012: Greatest Hits - Live
- 2014: The Best of the Booth Brothers (Live)
- 2017: Gospel Favorites
- 2019: Country Roads: Country and Inspirational Favorites (Live)

== Awards ==
The Booth Brothers were nominated for a Grammy Award for Best Southern, Country, or Bluegrass Gospel Album for their album Room for More. The album was also nominated for two Dove Awards at the 40th GMA Dove Awards: Southern Gospel Album of the Year and Southern Gospel Recorded Song of the Year.

Other Awards & Recognitions:

- 1998: The Gospel Voice (Sunrise Award)
- 1999:New Artist of the Year (SGMA Award)
- 2002: Trio of the Year (SGMA Award)
- 2003: Male Group of the Year (SGN Award)
- 2003: Traditional Song of the Year "Under God" (SGN Award)
- 2003: Traditional Southern Gospel Album "The Booth Brothers" (SGN Award)
- 2003: Best Album Cover "The Booth Brothers" (SGN Award)
- 2004: Best Live Performer of the Year (SGN Award)
- 2006: Song of the Year "He Saw It All" (SGN Award)
- 2006: Album of the Year "The Blind Man Saw It All" (SGN Award)
- 2006: Pacesetter Award (SGN Award)
- 2006: Male Vocalist of the Year (SGN Award)
- 2006: Male Group of the Year (SGN Award)
- 2006: Songwriter of the Year- Jim Brady (SGN Award)
- 2006: Traditional Southern Song of the Year (SGN Award)
- 2006: Fan Favorite Artist of the Year (SGN Award)
- 2006: Song of the Year "He Saw It All" (Singing News Fan Award)
- 2006: Favorite Trio (SGMA Award)
- 2006: Album of the Year "The Blind Man Saw It All" (SGMA Award)
- 2007: Male Vocalist of the Year- Ronnie Booth (Harmony Honors)
- 2007: Artist of the Year (Harmony Honors)
- 2007: Song of the Year "He Saw It All" (Harmony Honors)
- 2007: Male Group of the Year (SGN Award)
- 2007: Best Live Performer of the Year (SGN Award)
- 2007: Song of the Year "He Saw It All" (Diamond Award)
- 2007: Group of the Year (Singing News Fan Award)
- 2008: Male Vocalist of the Year- Ronnie Booth (SGN Award)
- 2008: Trio of the Year (Diamond Award)
- 2008: Tenor of the Year- Michael Booth (Singing News Fan Award)
- 2008: Lead Vocalist of the Year- Michael Booth (Singing News Fan Award)
- 2008: Trio of the Year (Singing News Fan Award)
- 2008: Album of the Year "Carry On" (Singing News Fan Award)
- 2008: Song of the Year "Look for Me at Jesus Feet" (Singing News Fan Award)
- 2008: Favorite Artist of the Year (Singing News Fan Award)
- 2009:
- 2016: Southern Gospel Album of the Year "Still" (Dove Award)

== See also ==
- Booth family
- John Wilkes Booth
