= T. Graham Brown =

American singer

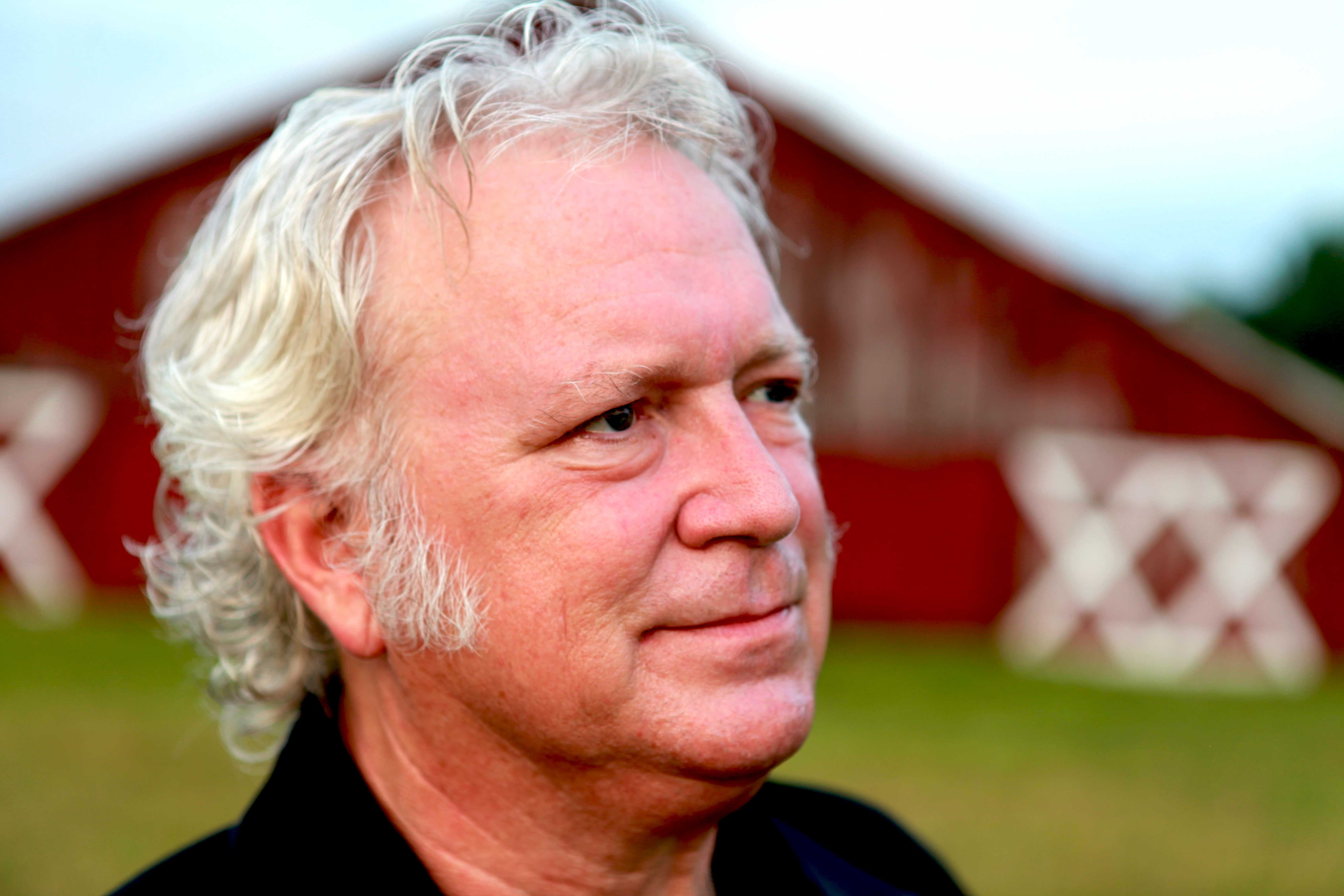
- Brown in 2015

Background information
- Born: Anthony Graham Brown; October 30, 1954 (age 71); Arabi, Georgia, U.S.
- Genre: Country
- Occupations: Singer, songwriter
- Instrument: Vocals
- Years active: 1973–present
- Labels: Capitol, Intersound, Madacy, Compendia, Aspirion, MCM-World Media, RED Distribution
- Website: www.tgrahambrown.com

Anthony Graham Brown (born October 30, 1954), known professionally as T. Graham Brown, is an American country music singer. Active since 1973, Brown has recorded 13 studio albums and has charted more than 20 singles on the Billboard Hot Country Songs chart. Three of these singles — "Hell and High Water" and "Don't Go to Strangers" from 1986 and "Darlene" from 1988 — reached number one and eight more made the top 10.

In 2024, he achieved one of country music's crowning achievements when he was invited to become a member of the Grand Ole Opry. Prior to his induction, Brown had made over 300 appearances as a guest performer.

== Biography ==
Anthony Graham Brown was born in 1954 in Arabi, Georgia. He first performed in a duo, Dirk and Tony (1973–75), before founding two more bands, Reo Diamond (1975) and T. Graham Brown's Rack of Spam (1979). He married his wife Sheila in 1980; they have a son, Acme Geronimo Brown (born 1989).

== Musical career ==
Brown moved to Nashville in 1982 and found work singing advertising jingles for companies such as McDonald's, Disneyland, Budweiser, Coors, Stroh's, Almond Joy, Coca-Cola, Sears, Dodge Trucks, Ford, Hardee's, Kentucky Fried Chicken, The Nashville Network, B.C.Powders, Dr Pepper, Mountain Dew, 7-Up, and Harrah's. He was also the singing narrator in the Taco Bell "Run For the Border" television spots. Brown also found work as a songwriter for EMI Publishing before signing to Capitol Records in 1984. He was with Universal Music Group Nashville for 13 years. His first release for the label, "Drowning in Memories", peaked at number 39 on the Billboard country chart. The title song "I Tell It Like It Used to Be" of his debut album went to number seven, followed by "I Wish That I Could Hurt That Way Again" to number four, giving way to a pair of number ones: "Hell and High Water" and "Don't Go to Strangers".

Brown's first release for the label, "Drowning in Memories", peaked at number 39 and was never included on an album. Next came the number-seven "I Tell It Like It Used to Be", the first single from his 1986 album of the same name. Counting its title track, this album accounted for four singles, the number-three "I Wish That I Could Hurt That Way Again" and two straight number ones in "Hell and High Water" and "Don't Go to Strangers".

Brown's second album for the label, Brilliant Conversationalist, followed a year later. Although none of its singles went to number one, it accounted for three more top-10 hits in its title track, followed by "She Couldn't Love Me Anymore" and "Last Resort". A third album, 1988's Come as You Were, produced his third and final number one in "Darlene". Then came the number-seven title track and number 30 "Never Say Never". In early 1990, he sang guest vocals on the multiartist charity single "Tomorrow's World", as well as Tanya Tucker's single "Don't Go Out", from her album Tennessee Woman.

The release of his next album, Bumper to Bumper, in 1990 had its lead-off single "If You Could Only See Me Now" go to the top 10 with a number-six peak, but two other singles — the number-18 "Moonshadow Road" and number-53 "I'm Sending One Up for You" — did not fare as well, with the latter being his first single to land outside the top 40. That same year, he also released an unsuccessful greatest-hits package. His next album, You Can't Take It with You, only accounted for the number-31 "With This Ring" before he left Capitol in 1991.

Brown did not record another album until 1998's Wine into Water on the Intersound label. This album produced four more singles for him, although the number-44 title track was the highest-charting single from it. The subject matter of the lyrics of the song surrounded Brown's then-ongoing fight against alcoholism. He then released two more independent albums: The Next Right Thing in 2003 and The Present in 2006.

Brown joined Broadway icon Carol Channing for a duet of "Don't Sit Under The Apple Tree" on her 2012 album True to the Red, White, and Blue. He also recorded a duet of "You Are So Beautiful" with Lulu Roman (of Hee Haw fame) for her 2013 album At Last. In 2012, Brown appeared on a Country/Gospel album

In 2014, Brown again collaborated with producer Mark Carman to produce the Grammy-nominated album, Forever Changed, featuring guest appearances by industry giants Leon Russell, the Oak Ridge Boys, Steve Cropper, Jeff and Sheri Easter, the Booth Brothers, Three Bridges, Jimmy Fortune, Sonya Isaacs, and Jason Crabb. In July 2014, the first single from the album was released on the MCM World Media Label. The song, "He'll Take Care of You", was written by well-known, award-winning songwriters Dan Penn, Gary Nicholson, and Donnie Fritts.

== Discography ==
Studio albums

- I Tell It Like It Used to Be (1986)
- Brilliant Conversationalist (1987)
- Come as You Were (1988)
- Bumper to Bumper (1990)
- You Can't Take It with You (1991)
- From a Stronger Place (1996)
- Wine into Water (1998)
- The Next Right Thing (2003)
- The Present (2006)
- Forever Changed (2015)
- Christmas with T. Graham Brown (2015)
- Bare Bones (2020)

== Awards and nominations ==
=== Grammy Awards ===
Year	Nominee / work	Award	Result
2015	Forever Changed	Best Roots Gospel Album	Nominated

=== TNN/Music City News Country Awards ===
Year	Nominee / work	Award	Result
1991	Tanya Tucker and T. Graham Brown	Vocal Collaboration of the Year	Nominated
1993	George Jones and Friends^{[C]}	Vocal Collaboration of the Year	Nominated

=== Academy of Country Music Awards ===
Year	Nominee / work	Award	Result
1986	T. Graham Brown	Top New Male Vocalist	Nominated
1991	Tanya Tucker and T. Graham Brown	Top Vocal Duo of the Year	Nominated

=== Country Music Association Awards ===
Year	Nominee / work	Award	Result
1987	T. Graham Brown	Horizon Award	Nominated
1990	"Don't Go Out"^{[A]}	Vocal Event of the Year	Nominated
1993	"I Don't Need Your Rockin' Chair"^{[C]}	Vocal Event of the Year	Won

^[A]Nominated alongside Tanya Tucker
^[B]George Jones' "Friends" also includes: Vince Gill, Garth Brooks, Travis Tritt, Joe Diffie, Mark Chesnutt, Alan Jackson, Pam Tillis, Patty Loveless and Clint Black
^[C]Nominated alongside George Jones and Friends
