= Doug Anderson (singer) =

American Christian music singer

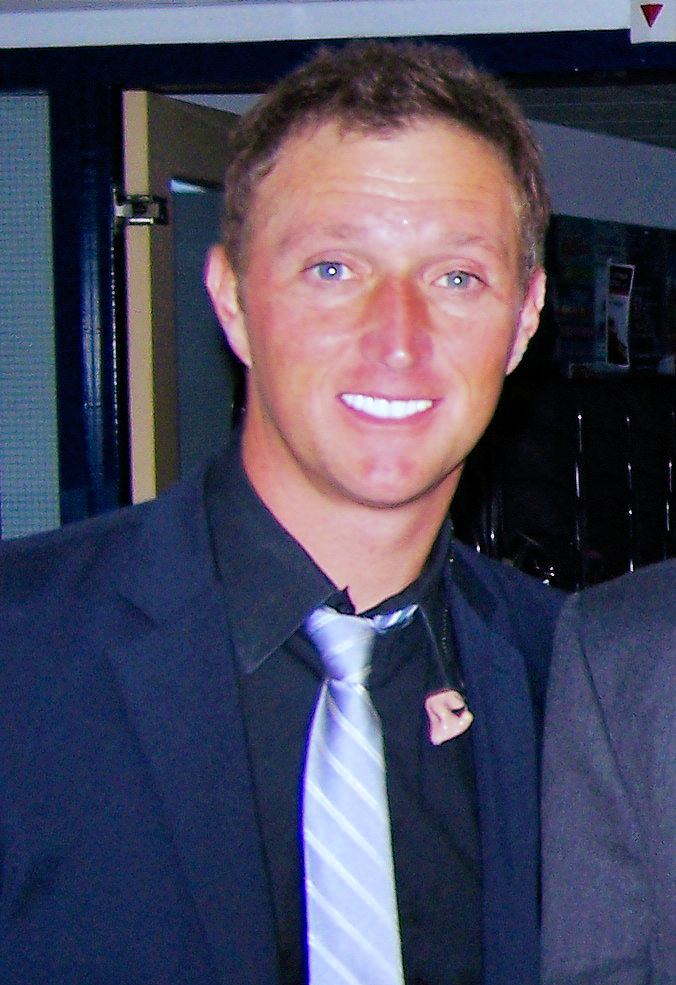
- Born: Doug Anderson; 31 August 1973 (age 53): Anderson, Indiana, U.S.
- Occupations: Singer; songwriter
- Years active: 2002–present
- Musical career
- Genres: Contemporary Christian music; country; gospel
- Instrument: Vocals
- Labels: StowTown Records; Provident Entertainment
- Member of: Signature Sound; Gaither Vocal Band; Cana's Voice
- Website: dougandersonmusic.net

Doug Anderson (born August 31, 1973, in Anderson, Indiana) is an American contemporary Christian singer. He is best known as Ernie Haase & Signature Sound's long time baritone since the quartet's formation. He took a break from the group in 2015 to pursue a solo career, but has returned as of November 2021.

== Early life ==
Anderson was born August 31, 1973, in Indiana, United States. As a youth at Lapel High School (the former building, that is), Doug played sports including basketball. He graduated in 1992. At Purdue University, he found a spot on the basketball team.

== Career ==
He turned toward music during college, joining a quartet called Lighthouse. One day, Lighthouse met a group called the Cathedral Quartet, which featured Ernie Haase. A while later, Haase set out on his own and invited Anderson to join him. Ernie Haase & Signature Sound officially formed in 2003. Anderson released his debut album "Dreamin' Wide Awake", on May 3, 2011. Doug formed part of the American Christian music trio Cana's Voice in 2016. They released their debut album This Changes Everything the same year. It was followed by Live at Champion Forest and Don't Wanna Miss This, in 2017 and 2019 respectively.

== Personal life ==
Anderson and his wife, who were high school sweethearts, married in August 1998. Michele and Doug have two daughters, Isabel and Emma. Doug's wife shares his love for sports.

== Discography ==
- Dreamin' Wide Awake (2011)
- Feeling At Home: Back Porch Sessions (2013)
- Drive (2014)
- The Only One (2016)
- Back Porch Christmas (2017)
- The Back Porch Sessions 2 (2020)

== Awards ==
Anderson was nominated for Male Vocalist of the Year in 2011 by the Gospel Music Association. Doug has been honored by GMA Dove Award wins, including Country Album of the Year twice and Country Song of the Year as well as several nominations for Album of the Year (with Ernie Haase & Signature Sound).

=== GMA Dove Awards ===
Year	Category	Nominee / Work	Result	Ref.
2011	Male Vocalist of the Year	Himself	Nominated	
2012	Country Album of the Year	Dreamin' Wide Awake	Won	
2012	Country Recorded Song of the Year	Dreamin' Wide Awake	Nominated	
2014	Country Album of the Year	Drive	Won	
2014	Country Recorded Song of the Year	Love With Open Arms	Won	
2017	Bluegrass/Country/Roots Recorded Song of The Year	Little White Church House	Nominated	
