= A Tribute to the Cathedral Quartet =

2010 album by Ernie Haase & Signature Sound

Studio album by Ernie Haase & Signature Sound
- Released: October 25, 2010
- Genres: Southern Gospel, CCM
- Length: 78:32
- Label: Spring House
- Producers: Wayne Haun, Lari Goss

Ernie Haase & Signature Sound chronology
Influenced: Spirituals & Southern Classics (2010)	A Tribute to the Cathedral Quartet (2010)	George Younce with Ernie Haase & Signature Sound (2011)

A Tribute to the Cathedral Quartet

Video by Ernie Haase & Signature Sound
- Released: October 25, 2010
- Genres: Southern Gospel, CCM
- Length: 112 minutes
- Label: Spring House/EMD
- Producers: Ernie Haase, Bill Gaither

Professional ratings
Review scores
Source	Rating
Allmusic	link

A Tribute to the Cathedral Quartet is a CD/DVD released by Christian gospel quartet Ernie Haase & Signature Sound. The album is a tribute to the gospel group the Cathedral Quartet with whom tenor singer Haase performed from 1990 to 1999. This DVD video is the first to feature their new lead singer, Devin McGlamery and last to feature their bass singer, Tim Duncan. The album was released on October 25, 2010 by Spring House Music.

== About ==
Ernie Haase & Signature Sound celebrate their musical roots in this very special tribute to the Cathedrals. This unforgettable musical event highlights the Cathedrals' beloved legacy and songs - memories that have left an indelible mark on gospel music. Ernie Haase & Signature Sound keep the classics alive and honor the group that first inspired them to sing about the timeless themes of faith, hope, and the infinite grace that never grows old.

== Awards ==
In 2011, the album was nominated for a Dove Award for Southern Gospel Album of the Year at the 42nd GMA Dove Awards, while the song "I Thirst" was nominated for Southern Gospel Recorded Song of the Year. The DVD version was also nominated for Long Form Music Video of the Year.

== Track listing ==
1. "Wedding Music" (Phil Cross, Kirk Talley) – 3:11
2. "Step into the Water" (Kirk Talley) – 3:24
3. "Boundless Love" (Dianne Wilkinson) – 3:38
4. "I Thirst" (Beverly Lowry) – 3:16
5. "This Ole House" (Stuart Hamblen) – 3:04
6. "Champion of Love" (Carolyn Cross, Phil Cross) – 4:09
7. "I'm Gonna Live Forever" (Shirley Cantrell) – 2:43
8. "Can He, Could He, Would He" (John Chisum, Dwight Liles) – 2:31
9. "Wonderful Grace of Jesus" (Haldor Lillenas) – 3:15
10. "Sinner Saved by Grace" (Gloria Gaither, William J. Gaither, Mitch Humphries) – 4:54
11. "An Old Convention Song" (Tim Lovelace, Roger Jerry Powell) – 2:28
12. "Mexico" (Luverne Isbell) – 3:53
13. "God Delivers Again" (Ronald Payne) – 3:11
14. "Life Will Be Sweeter" (Public Domain) – 3:35
15. "Moving Up to Gloryland" (Lee Roy Abernathy) – 2:55
16. "Plan of Salvation" (Ruby Moody) – 4:03
17. "We Shall See Jesus" (Dianne Wilkinson) – 5:02
18. "Yesterday" (George Younce) – 3:49
19. Gaither Medley: (Gloria Gaither, William J. Gaither) – 6:53
  - "Gentle Shepherd"
  - "There's Something About That Name"
  - "I Will Serve Thee"
  - "Jesus, We Just Want to Thank You"

Bonus Tracks

1. "Oh, What a Savior" (Live Version) (Marvin Dalton) – 5:10
2. "He Made a Change" (Live Version) (Ernie Haase, Joel Lindsey) – 3:17

== DVD track listing ==
1. "Wedding Music"
2. "Step Into the Water"
3. "Boundless Love"
4. "I’m Gonna Live Forever"
5. "An Old Convention Song"
6. "Oh, What a Savior"
7. "Wonderful Grace of Jesus" (with Wayne Haun)
8. "Sinner Saved by Grace"
9. "Yesterday"
10. "My Heart Is a Chapel"
11. "Swinging on the Golden Gate"
12. "Walk with Me" (with Bill Gaither)
13. "Can He, Could He, Would He"
14. "Mexico"
15. "Sweet Beulah Land" (with Squire Parsons)
16. "God Delivers Again"
17. "He Made a Change"
18. "Moving Up to Gloryland"
19. "The Laughing Song" (with George Younce)
20. "I Thirst"
21. "Champion of Love" (with Wayne Haun)
22. "Plan of Salvation"
23. "We Shall See Jesus" (with Glen Payne)
24. "This Ole House"
25. "Life Will Be Sweeter Someday" (Bonus)
