= Get Away, Jordan =

Live album by Ernie Haase & Signature Sound
- Released: January 23, 2007
- Genre: Southern Gospel, CCM
- Length: 55:15
- Label: Gaither Music Group

Ernie Haase & Signature Sound chronology
Ernie Haase & Signature Sound (2005)	Get Away, Jordan (2007)	Together (2007)

Get Away, Jordan

Video by Ernie Haase & Signature Sound
- Genre: Southern Gospel, CCM
- Length: 105 minutes
- Producer: Bill Gaither, Ernie Haase

Professional ratings
Review scores
Source	Rating
Allmusic	(not rated, no review) link

Get Away, Jordan is a live CD/DVD released by Christian gospel quartet Ernie Haase & Signature Sound. The album was produced by Gaither Music Group and released on January 23, 2007. This DVD video is the last to feature their piano player Roy Webb.

== Track listing ==
1. "Someday" (Moscheo) - 2:30
2. "He's My Guide" (Isaacs) - 2:24
3. "Lovest Thou Me (More Than These?)" (Gaither) - 3:08
4. "John in the Jordan" (Golden, Salley) - 2:59
5. "He Made a Change" (Ernie Haase, Lindsey) - 3:44
6. "Until We Fly Away" (Lindsey, Thum) - 3:24
7. "Beyond the Blues" (Lindsey, Silvey) - 3:09
8. "It Is Done" (Ferguson, Smith) - 4:16
9. "Our Debts Will Be Paid" (Weatherington) - 2:52
10. "Get Away, Jordan" (Traditional) - 2:52
11. "Happy Birthday, Anniversary Too" (Gaither, Haase) - 2:10
12. "I Pledge My Allegiance" (Gaither, Gaither) - 4:34
13. "The Star-Spangled Banner" (Francis Scott Key, John Stafford Smith) - 2:23
14. "Oh, What a Savior" (Dalton) - 5:42
15. "The Plan of Salvation" (Moody) - 4:25
16. "Get Away, Jordan" (Traditional) - 7:28

== DVD track listing ==
1. "Someday"
2. "He's My Guide"
3. "Our Debts Will Be Paid"
4. "Lovest Thou Me (More Than These?)"
5. "Dem Bones"
6. "He Made A Change"
7. "Happy Birthday, Anniversary Too"
8. "I Sing The Might Power Of God" (featuring the Ball Brothers)
9. "It Is Done"
10. "Pray For Me"
11. "Get Away, Jordan"
12. "Search Me, Lord" (featuring the Gaither Vocal Band)
13. "Home" (featuring the Gaither Vocal Band)
14. "He Touched Me" (featuring Ernie Haase & Signature Sound and Gaither Vocal Band)
15. "John In The Jordan"
16. "I Pledge My Allegiance"
17. "The Star-Spangled Banner"
18. "God Bless America"
19. "What God Says"
20. "Until We Fly Away"
21. "Softly And Tenderly" (featuring Roy Webb on piano)
22. "Oh, What A Savior"

== Awards ==
The album won a Dove Award for Southern Gospel Album of the Year at the 39th GMA Dove Awards. The DVD version was also nominated for Long Form Music Video of the Year, and the title song was nominated for Southern Gospel Recorded Song of the Year.
