= Taranda =

Taranda is a given name and a surname. Notable people with the surname include:

== Given name ==
- TaRanda Greene (born 1979), American Christian musician

== Surname ==
- Anya Taranda (1915–1970), American model, showgirl and actress
- Karyna Demidik, née Taranda (born 1999), Belarusian athlete
