= Cana's Voice =

Music Trio

- Origin: United States
- Genres: Worship; Southern gospel; Christian pop; Christian country; Christian R&B
- Years active: 2016–present
- Label: StowTown Records
- Members: Doug Anderson; TaRanda Greene; Jody McBrayer
- Website: canasvoice.com

Cana's Voice is an American Christian music trio from the United States; which formed in 2016. They have released one studio album, This Changes Everything (2016), with StowTown Records.

== History ==
The trio are Ernie Haase & Signature Sound's Doug Anderson, Avalon's Jody McBrayer, and The Greenes' TaRanda Greene. They started recording music in 2016, when they signed to StowTown Records. Their first studio album, This Changes Everything, was released on May 27, 2016, from StowTown Records.

== Discography ==
Studio albums

- This Changes Everything (May 27, 2016, StowTown)
- Live at Champion Forest (2017, Provident)
- Don't Wanna Miss This (2019, Provident)
