= Wesley Pritchard =

- Genres: Christian, Southern Gospel

K. Wesley Pritchard is a Southern Gospel musician closely associated with Ernie Haase.

He sang with the Old Friends Quartet from 2000 through 2002. He filled in for Ernie Haase & Signature Sound in 2003, while Hasse was seeking a new lead singer when Shane Dunlap left. He has written songs for Amy Lambert of Greenes fame. He has also traveled extensively with the Gaither Vocal Band and has made regular appearances with "Bill Gaither's Homecoming Friends" and can be seen on many of those videos.

He also currently owns and operates Mill West Recording in Fayetteville, North Carolina.

He and his wife Teresa are currently the senior pastors of the Fayetteville Community Church that his parents, Ken and Lillian, founded with 11 dedicated believers in 1972. Wesley's brother Byron Pritchard is also the music director.
