= Ernie Haase & Signature Sound (album) =

Studio album by Ernie Haase & Signature Sound
- Released: October 25, 2005
- Genre: Southern Gospel, CCM
- Length: 38:34
- Label: Gaither Music Group
- Producer: Lari Goss

Ernie Haase & Signature Sound chronology
| Stand By Me: Live (2005) | Ernie Haase & Signature Sound (2005) | Get Away, Jordan (2007) |

Ernie Haase & Signature Sound

Video by Ernie Haase & Signature Sound
- Venue: Reardon Auditorium, Anderson University
- Genre: Southern Gospel, CCM
- Length: 120 minutes
- Label: Gaither Music Group
- Producer: Bill Gaither, Ernie Haase

Professional ratings
Review scores
| Source | Rating |
|---|---|
| Allmusic | (?) |

Ernie Haase & Signature Sound is an self-titled album released by the Christian gospel quartet of the same name. The album was produced by Gaither Music Group and released on October 25, 2005. This album also has a DVD companion filmed at the Reardon Auditorium, Anderson University in Anderson, Indiana. This DVD video paid tribute to George Younce who had died on April 11, 2005.

== Track listing ==
1. "Shout, Brother, Shout" (Lari Goss) - 2:14
2. "Trying to Get a Glimpse" (Suzanne Jennings, James Weatherington) - 3:29
3. "Godspeed" (Joel Lindsey, Sue C. Smith) - 3:07
4. "Then Came the Morning" (Chris Christian, Gloria Gaither, Bill Gaither) - 4:50
5. "Do You Want to Be Forgiven" (Rodney Griffin) - 3:45
6. "This Old Place" (Dianne Wilkinson) - 5:08
7. "If This Is What God Wants" (Griffin) - 3:15
8. "Pray for Me" (Wilkinson) - 3:58
9. "Goodbye Egypt (Hello Canaan Land)" (Marty Funderburk, Jerry Kelso) - 2:44
10. "Forgiven Again" (Benjamin Gaither, Gloria Gaither) - 5:09
11. "Godspeed" (Reprise) (Lindsey, Smith) - 3:23

== DVD Track listing ==
1. "Program Opening"
2. "Comedy" (featuring Bill Gaither, Ernie Haase & Signature Sound)
3. "Glory To God In The Highest"
4. "Stand By Me"
5. "Comedy" (featuring Bill Gaither, Ernie Haase & Signature Sound)
6. "Shout, Brother, Shout"
7. "Lead Me, Guide Me"
8. "I'm Telling The World About His Love"
9. "Trying To Get A Glimpse"
10. "Forgiven Again" (Introduction by Gloria Gaither)
11. "Do You Want To Be Forgiven"
12. "On My Way, On My Own" (featuring Lynda Randle)
13. "Will The Lord Be With Me"
14. "Happy Rhythm" (featuring Wesley Pritchard)
15. "Hold To God's Unchanging Hand" (featuring Russ Taff)
16. "Farther Along"
17. "This Old Place"
18. "Godspeed"
19. "Then Came The Morning"
20. "Where No One Stands Alone" (featuring the Gaither Vocal Band)
21. "Oh! What A Time" (featuring the Gaither Vocal Band, Russ Taff)
22. "This Could Be The Dawning Of That Day"
23. "Tribute To George Younce"
24. "What A Savior"
25. "Stand By Me/Glory To God In The Highest"
26. "Credits"

== Awards ==
The album was nominated for a Dove Award for Southern Gospel Album of the Year at the 37th GMA Dove Awards.
