= The Talleys =

Southern gospel band

- Also known as: The Talley Trio (1996–2011)
- Genres: Christian, southern gospel
- Occupation: Singers
- Instrument: Voice
- Years active: 1984–1993, 1996–2020
- Labels: Word Entertainment/Caanan Records; Horizon
- Past members: Lauren Talley; Roger Talley; Debra Talley; Kirk Talley; Brian Alvey
- Website: thetalleys.com

The Talleys were a southern gospel trio composed of Roger and Debra Talley, and their daughter Lauren Talley as the lead and soprano singer. Performing over 20 years, they have made appearances all over the world. At the end of 2020 Roger and Debra retired as singers and Lauren began singing full time as a soloist at the start of 2021.

== Group history ==
In the 1970s, Roger and Kirk got their start with the Hoppers. Debra sang with the Songmasters Quartet. Roger and Debra married in 1978. Debra joined Roger and as part of the Hoppers and Kirk went to the Cathedral Quartet. In 1984, Kirk wanted to start a new group with Roger and Debra prompting them to form The Talleys. In 1993, the group disbanded and Kirk started a solo career. But by the mid 1990s, Lauren's interest and talent in singing could not be ignored, prompting her mother and father to join with her in the formation of the Talley Trio in 1996. The group has received numerous accolades from the GMA Dove Awards, Singing News Fan Awards, the Southern Gospel Music Guild Harmony Honors, the BMI Awards and SGN Music Awards.

On June 25, 2011, the Talley Trio changed its name back to the Talleys.

On November 20, 2019, The Talleys announced that 2020 would be their final year of touring.

== Members ==
Line-ups
1983–1992 (under the name "The Talleys")	Kirk Talley – Tenor; Roger Talley – Lead/Piano; Debra Talley – Alto	As For Me and My House (1983); Lift Your Voice (1984); Wherever I Am (1984); Work of Heart (1985); United (1986); For Every Generation (1988); Family Christmas (1988); Typical Day (1989); Love Will (1990); A Night to Remember (1992)
1996–2011 (under the name "Talley Trio")	Roger Talley – Lead/Piano; Debra Talley – Alto; Lauren Talley – Lead/Soprano	Roger, Debra And Lauren (1996); So Thankful (1997); Sunday In The Smokies (1998); Life Story (1999); Testament (2000); It's Christmas (2000); Encore (2000); Southern Gospel Treasury Series (2000); Hope for Tomorrow (2002); The Message (2003); Praise for the Ages (2004); Rise Above (2006); Stages (2007); Life Goes On (2008); Songs You Know By Heart (2009); Stories and Songs (2010); He's Alive (2011)
2011–2013 (under the name "The Talleys")	Roger Talley – Lead; Debra Talley – Alto; Lauren Talley Alvey - Lead/Soprano; Brian Alvey - Baritone/piano/bass guitar	Love Won (2012)
2013–2020	Roger Talley – Lead/Piano; Debra Talley – Alto; Lauren Talley –Lead/Soprano	The Test of Time (2014); After All This Time (2015); God Is Able (2017); Finest Hour (2018); Hymns Of The Faith (2019); The Music Goes On (2020)

== Discography ==
- 1983: As For Me and My House
- 1984: Lift Your Voice
- 1984: Wherever I Am
- 1985: Work of Heart
- 1986: United
- 1988: For Every Generation
- 1988: Family Christmas
- 1989: Typical Day
- 1990: Love Will
- 1992: A Night to Remember

---as the Talley Trio---

- 1996: Roger, Debra, & Lauren
- 1996: Encore
- 1997: So Thankful
- 1998: Life Story
- 2000: Testament
- 2000: It's Christmas
- 2002: Hope for Tomorrow
- 2003: The Message
- 2004: Praise for the Ages
- 2006: Rise Above
- 2007: Stages
- 2008: Life Goes On
- 2009: Songs You Know By Heart
- 2010: Stories and Songs

---As the Talleys---

- 2012: Love Won
- 2014: The Test of Time
- 2015: After All This Time
- 2018: Finest Hour

=== Compilations ===
- 2001: Southern Gospel Treasury
- 2005: Anthology
- 2014: The Best Of The Talleys Vol. 1 & 2
- 2017: God Is Able

=== Solo albums ===
Roger Talley (instrumental):

- 1988: The Legacy

Debra Talley:

- 1997: Road Home
- 2003: Seasons of the Heart

Lauren Talley:

- 2001: Lauren Talley
- 2003: Surrender
- 2005: I Live
- 2010: Songs in the Night
- 2017: The Gospel
- 2022: This Is For You

=== Video ===
- 2001: Sunday in the Smokies
- 2001: Testament
- 2001: Talley Reunion Live After Eight Years
- 2002: At Home With the Talley Trio
- 2004: Live Across America
- 2005: Praise For The Ages
- 2007: Red Letter Day
- 2008: Bright Lights, Big Stage
- 2010: He's Alive

NUMBER ONE SINGLES:

- Searchin'

- The Healer

- The Answer is Christ

- I Love the Lord / Total Praise

- His Life For Mine

- Jesus Saves

- The Debt

- The Broken Ones

- That's Enough

- Life Goes On

- Up Above

Top 10 Singles

- Testify

- I Am What I Am

- I Love The Cross

- I'm Happy With You Lord

- Mountain Mover

- Orphans of God

- Red Letter Day

- My Hope is in the Lord

- He's Alive

- The Promise

- Applause

- Hands of Grace

- Who Will Pray

- Broken World

- When He Calls, I'll Fly Away

- Hidden Heroes

- What You Leave Behind

- Great Is Thy Faithfulness

- The People In the Line

- After All This Time

- There Is Coming A Day

- Look Up

- Grab Your Umbrella

- When Death Was Arrested

- Looks Like Jesus To Me

- The Healer In the Grave

- This Day
