= Glorious Day =

Studio album by Ernie Haase & Signature Sound
- Released: March 29, 2013
- Recorded: 2012–2013
- Genre: Southern gospel; gospel; country
- Length: 40:46
- Label: StowTown Records
- Producer: Ernie Haase; Wayne Haun

Ernie Haase & Signature Sound chronology
Here We Are Again (2012)	Glorious Day (2013)	Christmas Live! (2013)

Glorious Day is a studio album by Ernie Haase & Signature Sound. This album is the first to feature their new bass singer, Paul Harkey.

== Commercial performance ==
Glorious Day peaked at No. 40 on the Christian & Gospel Album Sales chart.

== Track listing ==
1. When Jesus Breaks the Morning
2. When The Saints go marching in
3. That's Why
4. Scars in the Hands of Jesus
5. Shh, Be Still
6. Water walking God
7. Noah Found Grace In the Eyes of the Lord
8. Two Coats'
9. While I Was a Sinner
10. Glorious Day
11. Sometimes I Wonder (Live acoustic version)

== Charts ==
Chart performance for Glorious Day
Chart (2013)	Peak position
US Christian Albums (Billboard)	34
