= This Changes Everything =

This Changes Everything may refer to:

- This Changes Everything (book), a 2014 book about climate change and economics by Naomi Klein
  - This Changes Everything (2015 film), a film by Avi Lewis based on the book
- This Changes Everything (2018 film), a film on sexism in Hollywood by Tom Donahue
- This Changes Everything (album), a 2016 album by Cana's Voice
- This Changes Everything, a 2016 album by Jim Lauderdale
