= Shane Dunlap =

American singer

- Genres: Christian, Southern Gospel
- Occupation: Gospel Lead Singer
- Years active: 1992 – present

Shane Dunlap was the original lead singer for Ernie Haase & Signature Sound, a Southern Gospel quartet. Prior to that, he was a founding member of N'Harmony with his father Steve Dunlap. Steve died in 1999. After leaving Signature Sound, he started a solo career.

In 2008, he formed a new group and resumed the N'Harmony name. The new N'Harmony's original lineup was tenor Brent Mitchell, lead Shane Dunlap, baritone Chris Whitaker, and bass Will Van Wygarden. Whitaker left in early 2009; at this point, Dunlap moved to baritone, and Josh Feemster came on board as lead singer. Dunlap bad also replaced Ivan Parker as lead singer of "The Trio" With Kirk Talley and Anthony Burger for a short time before Burger's passing and has had a temporary stint with Mercy's Mark.

Shane now serves as the Worship Pastor at Lee Park Church in Monroe, NC.
