= Dixie Melody Boys =

Southern Gospel Group

- Origin: Kinston, North Carolina, U.S.
- Genres: Southern Gospel, Christian, Country Gospel, Contemporary Christian, Christian Pop
- Years active: 1961–2023
- Labels: Demco, BMC, QCA, Custom, Benson, Greentree, Morningstar,
- Past members: See complete listing below.

The Dixie Melody Boys were an American Southern Gospel quartet from Kinston, North Carolina formed in 1961 and retired in 2023. The group was known for giving many young Southern Gospel and Christian artists their start in the gospel music industry and their innovation in the Christian music field.

== History ==
The modern Dixie Melody Boys began in the spring of 1962, but they were not the first group to employ the name. An earlier Dixie Melody Boys had been associated with the Stamps-Baxter songbook company around 1950 in Oklahoma City, Oklahoma. In 1955 the group reformed and consisted of Asbury Adkins (tenor), Bill Nelson (lead), Clovis Simpkins (baritone), Jim Terry (bass) and Johnny Bruce (pianist). Simpkins left after a short time and Homer Fry became the baritone. This early version of the Dixie Melody Boys dissolved in 1957, but would reform again in 1961. Members of the group around this time included Ralph Walker (tenor), Avis Adkins (lead), Gene Payne (baritone), Marvin Harris (bass), and a young teenager named Tony Brown (pianist). Brown went on to play with JD Sumner And The Stamps Quartet.

Bass singer and eventual long-term group owner Ed O'Neal arrived in the mid-1960s initially to "fill in" at the bass position. O'Neal eventually purchased the group and relocated them to Kinston, North Carolina. The group had success initially as a regional group. In 1970, O'Neal attended the National Quartet Convention as a fan in Memphis, Tennessee and noticed the event included an amateur stage where up-and-coming talent was allowed to perform a couple of songs for exposure. O'Neal and his group performed at the NQC the following year, the first year it was held in Nashville, Tennessee. This expanded their reach and helped the group transition to full-time. The group had their first commercial success with their 1978 album Sending Up Some Boards. Then in 1982, the group's song "Antioch Church Choir" reached the number one position on the Singing News monthly airplay chart. The song would become the signature song of the group over the duration of the group's existence.

== DMB Band Period (1982–1986) ==
In an attempt to reach younger gospel music fans, the group added a full on-stage band and started to include country, pop, and soft rock sounds into their music both onstage and on their record releases. The group started to go by the name "The DMB Band" for this period of time. The group's new sound was criticized by traditional southern gospel fans and certain writers for outlets such as The Singing News fearing that the group would be moving into the direction of becoming a full contemporary christian band such as The Imperials or The Oak Ridge Boys, however the new sound was overall well received by most fans. The group would return to a traditional southern gospel quartet style in 1987.

== Ed O'Neal University ==
Over the past 55 years, the group has had dozens of members, many of whom moved onto other gospel quartets or started solo careers that are notable in the gospel and christian music field. This led to current Greater Vision lead singer and bass guitarist Rodney Griffin, who sang with the group from 1992-1993 to nickname the group Ed O'Neal University as a training ground for many current prominent gospel artists. Among the notable southern gospel artists that sang with the Dixie Melody Boys are Devin McGlamery, Ernie Haase, McCray Dove, and record producer Tony Brown. In 2011, the group released their 50th anniversary project The Call Is Still The Same and held their anniversary reunion celebration at the National Quartet Convention. The group added newcomer, Aaron Dishman, in June 2013 and the quartet veteran, Josh Garner, to their line up in September 2013, marking a new chapter in their history.

== Awards ==
In 2000, O'Neal was awarded the Marvin Norcross Award, an annual award given to the Southern Gospel artist that has made distinct contributions to the music. In 2004, O'Neal was inducted into the Southern Gospel Hall of Fame. In January 2012, the Dixie Melody Boys were honored in the Southern Gospel Music Fan awards. and won Favorite Quartet and Favorite Bass Singer. The group also won the Favorite Male Quartet and Favorite Bass Singer awards in 2013.

== Personnel ==
Final Lineup

- Ed O'Neal – bass (since 1963)
- Buddy Bates–tenor (Since 2020)
- Willie Sawrey – baritone (since 2016)
- Cayden Howell–lead (since 2019)

Former

Bass

- Donald Henderson (1961)
- Buddy Hawley (1961-1962)
- Marvin Harris (1962-1963)
- Ed O’Neal (1963-2019, part-time following MVA in 2019)
- Will Lane (2019)
- Earl Roberts (2019-2022)

Baritone

- Gene Payne (1961-1964)
- Delmar Tilghman (1964-1975)
- Henry Daniels (1975-1978)
- Tom Jones (1978-1981)
- Frank Sutton (1981-1983)
- Allen O'Neal (1984–1986)
- David DeLawder (1986–1987)
- Nathan Widenor (1987–1991)
- Bill Bass (1991–1992)
- Rodney Griffin (1992–1993)
- Jamie Bramlett (1994–1995)
- Dave Needham (1995–1997)
- Craig Singletary (1997–1998)
- Kenny Cook (1998)
- Derrick Selph (1998–2003)
- Jeremy Wilkerson (2003)
- Dustin Sweatman (2003–2004)
- Andrew King (2004–2007)
- Bryan Walker (2007)
- Steven Cooper (2007–2013)
- Aaron Dishman (2013–2016)
- Willie Sawrey (2016-present)

Lead

- Avis Adkins (1961-1968)
- John Jarman (1968-1975)
- Dewey Williams (1975-1978)
- David Kimbrel (1978-1982)
- Kent Humphries (1981–1986)
- McCray Dove (1986–1998)
- Jamie Caldwell (1998–2000)
- Devin McGlamery (2000–2004)
- Dustin Sweatman (2004–2006)
- Donald Moris (2006, 2009–2012)
- Bryan Walker (2006–2007)
- Rob Shelton (2007–2008)
- Joe Kitson (2008–2009)
- Mike Rogers (2012–2013)
- Josh Garner (2013-2019)
- Nathan Potts (2019)
- Cayden Howell (2019-2023)

Tenor

- Ralph Walker (1961-1968)
- Charles Forehand (1968-1974)
- Bobby Craft (1974-1975)
- Jimmy Jones (1975-1978)
- Phil Barker (1976-1977, 1978-1983)
- Jamey Ragle (1977–1978)
- Ernie Haase (1983)
- Frank Sutton (1983–1986)
- Gary Coursey (1986)
- David Walker (1986–1987)
- Derrick Boyd (1987-1993, 2019-2020)
- Harold Reed (1993–2004)
- Dan Keeton (2004–2007)
- Jonathan Price (2007–2010)
- Matt Felts (2010–2014)
- Doug Pittman (2014–2017)
- Jerry Skaggs (2017-2019)
- Buddy Bates (2020-present)

Piano

- Tony Brown (1961-1964)
- Everette Harper (1964-1975)
- Greg Simpkins (1975-1978)
- Willie Ollinger (1978)
- Jerry Kelso (1978–1985)
- Bobby Ledford (1986–1988)
- Joe Lane (1988–1989)
- Dwight Young (1989)
- Steve Wood (1989–1992)
- Eric Ollis (1991–2004)
- Dustin Sweatman (2004–2006) (played and sang)
- Aaron Dishman (2013–2016) (played and sang)

Instrumentalist

- JL Marslender (1974–1975)
- Ron Wells (1977-1983)
- Larry DeLawder (1986–1995)
- Jeff Knight (1985–1986)
- Craig Hamm (lead guitar) 1983–1986
- Allen O’Neal (rhythm guitar) 1975-1986
- George Shambaugh Jr. (guitar) 1986
- Randy O’Neal (drummer) 1981-1983
- Ricky Horrell (drummer) 1983
- Olan Witt (drummer) 1983–1985
- Darren Humphrey (drummer) 1986–1988
- Jerry Dunbar (bass guitar) 1968-1973
- Reb Lancaster (bass guitar) 1973-1980
- Frank Sutton (bass guitar) 1980-1986
- Gary Coursey (bass guitar) 1986
- David DeLawder (bass guitar) 1986-1987
- Nathan Widener (bass guitar) 1987-1991
- Bill Bass (bass guitar) 1991-1992
- Rodney Griffin (bass guitar) 1992-1993
- Jamie Bramlett (bass guitar) 1993-1995
- David Needham (bass guitar) 1995-1997
- Craig Singletary (bass guitar) 1997-1998
- Jamie Caldwell (bass guitar) 1998-2000
- Andrew King (bass guitar) 2004-2006
- Steven Cooper (bass guitar) 2013

== Discography ==
- Jesus Use Me (1963)
- Answering Requests (1964)
- Listen (1965)
- Favorite Instrumentals of the Dixie Melody Boys (1966)
- Together (1973)
- Alive (1974)
- Unlimited (1974)
- Refreshing Soounds (1975)
- He Came Back (1975)
- Refreshing (1976)
- Are You Ready for Gospel (1977)
- Sending Up Boards (1978)
- Favorite Hymns (1978)
- Campmeeting Gospel (1978)
- The Sing-Sational (1979)
- Sing Happy Gospel (1979)
- Live! (1980)
- Just As We Are (1981)
- And Friends Live 1982
- Antioch Church Choir (1982)
- More Than Just Good Ole Boys (1983)
- Too Much Thunder (1984)
- Streetwise (Benson RO3899, 1985)
- Run Little Brother (1986)
- Back Home (1988)
- Ridin' High (1989)
- On Fire (1990)
- Sing The Classics 1990
- Dynamic (1991)
- Gonna Praise the Lord Live (1992)
- No Compromise (1993)
- Masterpiece (1994)
- Traditions & Harmony (1996)
- Old Time Religion (1996)
- 100% Pure Southern Gospel (1997)
- Live in Music City (1998)
- Heading Home (1999)
- Something Old, Something New (2001)
- Quartet Classics (2001)
- Request Time (2001)
- Vintage (2002)
- A Seat in the Heavenly Choir (2004)
- Like Never Before (2005)
- Live at Pigeon Forge (2005)
- Hymns (2006)
- Traditions (2006)
- Smooth and Easy (2006)
- Serenade (2007)
- Back to the Good Ole' Days (2007)
- Singing the Classics (2009)
- Hits Live (2010)
- The Call Is Still the Same (2011)
- Have You Heard (2013)
- Revived (2015)
- Worth Every Mile (2021)

In 2004 and 2005, the group released eight compilation albums, entitled Historic Journey vols. 1–8.

Between 2011–2015, several compilations were released:, including Ed O'Neal University: EOU Alumni Vols 1–5, Sights of Heaven, Best of Ed O'Neal, Classic Live Performances, and Radio Hits.
