= Greater Vision =

Southern gospel trio

- Origin: Morristown, Tennessee, United States
- Genres: Southern gospel, Christian
- Years active: 1990–present
- Labels: Benson/Riversong (1990-1996), Daywind (1995-Present)
- Members: Gerald Wolfe; Scott Mullens; Rodney Griffin; Chris Allman
- Past members: Jon Epley; Jacob Kitson; Mark Trammell; Jason Waldroup
- Website: www.greatervisionmusic.com

Greater Vision is an American Southern gospel music trio founded in 1990. It is one of Southern gospel's most popular trios and has been noted for their prolonged commercial and musical success spanning over three decades. As of 2025, the group is made up of Gerald Wolfe, Rodney Griffin, Scott Mullens, and Chris Allman. Over the last several years, this trio has consistently been named Southern gospel's top male trio, winning the Singing News Awards and have placed numerous top songs on the Southern Gospel Charts and Radio.

== Group history ==
The group formed in December 1990 when Mark Trammell left the Cathedral Quartet and teamed with Cathedrals alum Gerald Wolfe. They recruited tenor Chris Allman. The group quickly became a success. Their first project, On A Journey (1990), propelled them into seemingly overnight popularity. The group followed up with the albums You Can Have A Song (1992), 20 Inspirational Favorites (1993) and Serving A Risen Savior (1994), were all released on the Riversong/Benson Music Group label and was well received among fans and industry. By 1997, the group had left the Riversong label and joined Daywind records, releasing new albums, including When I See The Cross.

== Personnel changes ==
In 1993, Mark Trammell departed for Gold City and was replaced by Dixie Melody Boys baritone singer and bass guitarist Rodney Griffin. Allman left in late 1995 to attend seminary studies and was replaced by Jason Waldroup. This lineup of Wolfe, Griffin, and Waldroup stayed intact for 13 years and was both immensely popular and successful. Waldroup's smooth tenor and Griffin's strong baritone and songwriting ability launched the group into the forefront of the gospel music scene. In 2008, Waldroup decided to leave to pursue a seminary education. In May, Jacob Kitson was announced as the new tenor. Kitson’s stay was short-lived. In 2010, Chris Allman returned after an almost fifteen-year absence, thus coming back full circle to the almost original blend and sound. In 2017, Jon Epley joined the group to sing baritone. In February of 2025, after nearly eight years with the group, Jon Epley announced his departure. Scott Mullens was announced as his replacement.

== Second-Half quartet ==
In 2014, Greater Vision and the Mark Trammell Quartet appeared the same night at an event in Marion, Illinois. By combining the two groups during the second half of the concert, the moniker "Second Half Quartet" was formed. In 2015, Gerald Wolfe, Mark Trammell, Pat Barker, Rodney Griffin and Chris Allman took home a variety of awards at Gospel Music's premier award show, the Singing News Fan Awards. Mark Trammell was voted Favorite Baritone of the Year by fans, becoming the first Gospel singer to win such an award in four separate decades; Pat Barker took home the Favorite New Soloist award; Greater Vision's song, “For All He’s Done,” was voted Song of the Year and once again, Rodney Griffin was the recipient of the Favorite Songwriter Award.

== Members (past and present) ==
=== Line-ups ===
1990-1993	1993-1995	1995–2008
Chris Allman – tenor; Gerald Wolfe – lead, piano, group owner; Mark Trammell – baritone, bass guitar, group owner	Chris Allman – tenor, bass guitar; Gerald Wolfe – lead, piano, group owner; Rodney Griffin – baritone	Jason Waldroup – tenor; Gerald Wolfe – lead, piano, group owner; Rodney Griffin – baritone, bass guitar
2008-2010	2010-2017	2017–2025
Jacob Kitson – tenor; Gerald Wolfe – lead, piano, group owner; Rodney Griffin – baritone, bass guitar	Chris Allman – tenor; Gerald Wolfe – lead, piano, group owner; Rodney Griffin – baritone, bass guitar	Chris Allman – tenor; Rodney Griffin – lead, bass guitar; Jon Epley - baritone; Gerald Wolfe – piano, emcee, group owner
2025-present
Chris Allman – tenor; Rodney Griffin – lead, bass guitar; Scott Mullens - baritone; Gerald Wolfe – piano, emcee, group owner

== Second-Half quartet members ==
=== Line-ups ===
2014–2018

(under the name "Second-Half Quartet")

- Chris Allman – tenor
- Rodney Griffin – lead
- Mark Trammell – baritone, bass guitar, group owner
- Pat Barker – bass
- Gerald Wolfe – piano, group owner

== Cathedrals Family Reunion members ==
=== Line-ups ===
2009	2012	2013–2014 (under the name "Cathedrals Family Reunion")
Danny Funderburk – tenor; Scott Fowler – lead; Mark Trammell – baritone, bass guitar; Glenn Dustin – bass; Tim Parton – piano; Gerald Wolfe – piano, vocals	Ernie Haase – tenor; Scott Fowler – lead; Mark Trammell – baritone, bass guitar; Glenn Dustin – bass; Gerald Wolfe – piano, vocals	Danny Funderburk – tenor; Ernie Haase – tenor; Scott Fowler – lead; Mark Trammell – baritone; Pat Barker – bass; Matt Fouch – bass; Paul Harkley – bass; Trey Ivey – piano; Wesley Pritchard – bass guitar; Gerald Wolfe – piano, vocals

== Discography ==
=== Studio and Live Albums ===
Sources:

- 1991 You Can Have A Song
- 1991 On a Journey
- 1992 It's Just Like Heaven (also released in the Encore Series in 2005)(i)
- 1993 The King Came Down
- 1993 20 Inspirational Favorites
- 1994 Serving a Risen Savior
- 1994 Where He Leads Me
- 1995 Take Him at His Word
- 1996 The Shepherds Found a Lamb
- 1996 Sing It Again!
- 1997 When I See the Cross
- 1999 Far Beyond This Place
- 1999 A Greater Vision Christmas
- 2000 Perfect Candidate
- 2002 Live at First Baptist Church in Atlanta
- 2003 Quartets
- 2003 Live At The Palace (with Legacy Five)
- 2004 Faces
- 2006 My Favorite Place
- 2005 Fifteen
- 2006 Hymns of the Ages
- 2007 Everyday People
- 2008 Not Alone
- 2009 Live at Oak Tree
- 2010 20 Years: Live In Texas
- 2010 Welcome Back
- 2011 The Only Way
- 2012 Hymns of the Ages (Re-Issued)
- 2012 Our Most Requested... LIVE!
- 2013 For All He's Done
- 2015 As We Speak
- 2015 Jubilee Christmas Again
- 2017 Still
- 2018 Life Is A Song
- 2019 You’ve Arrived
- 2021 The Journey
- 2022 Think About There
- 2023 Christmas In London - with The Royal Philharmonic Orchestra
- 2024 Your Story

=== Compilation albums ===
Sources:

- 1996 The Church Hymnal Series Volume One
- 1996 Sing It Again
- 1999 The Church Hymnal Series Volume Two
- 2000 Through The Years With Greater Vision: Our Southern Gospel Hits
- 2001 The Church Hymnal Series Volume Three
- 2004 Songs From the Stories
- 2005 Now & Then
- 2005 The Church Hymnal Series Volume Four
- 2008 Favorites From The Church Hymnal Series
- 2008 Featuring Jason Waldroup-13 Great Years, 13 Unforgettable Songs
- 2008 Memories Made New
- 2009 Jubilee (with The Booth Brothers and Legacy Five)
- 2009 Nothin' But Fast
- 2010 Jubilee 2
- 2010 Everything Christmas
- 2011 Sing It Again (Re-Issued)
- 2011 The Ones that Got Away (Songs from the Pen of Rodney Griffin)
- 2012 Jubilee 3
- 2012 Jubilee Christmas
- 2013 Jubilee Christmas A' CAPPELLA
- 2014 Where He Leads Me (Re-Issued)
- 2014 Because You Asked
- 2016 Greater Vision 25 Silver Edition
- 2019 Our Very Best

== Awards ==
Group Awards

- 1999 Favorite Trio and Song of the Year: My Name Is Lazarus
- 2000 Favorite Trio, Album of the Year: Far Beyond This Place, and Song of the Year: Just One More Soul
- 2001 Favorite Trio and Favorite Video: Live From Morristown
- 2002 Favorite Trio, Album of the Year: Live At First Baptist Atlanta, and Favorite Video: Live At First Baptist Atlanta
- 2003 Favorite Trio and Album of the Year: Quartets
- 2004 Favorite Trio, Song of the Year: Just Ask, and Favorite Video: Quartets Live
- 2005 Favorite Trio and Song of the Year: Faces
- 2006 Favorite Trio
- 2010 Album of the Year: Jubilee (With Legacy Five and The Booth Brothers)
- 2012 Song of the Year: I Know A Man Who Can
- 2014 Song of the Year: Preacher Tell Me Like It Is
- 2015 Song of the Year: For All He's Done
- 2019 Favorite Trio
- 2020 Favorite Trio
- 2022 Favorite Trio and Favorite Song: Start With Well Done

=== Number One Songs ===
- 1999 My Name is Lazarus
- 1999 Just One More Soul
- 2001 He’s Still Waiting By the Well
- 2011 Never Been
- 2012 I Know a Man Who Can
- 2013 Looking for the Grace
- 2014 Preacher Tell Me Like it Is
- 2014 For All He’s Done
- 2015 Put Out the Fire
- 2017 Never Will I Ever Again
- 2018 Still
- 2018 God Doesn’t Care
- 2019 Rolled Back Stone
