= Anthony Burger =

American pianist and singer (1961-2006)

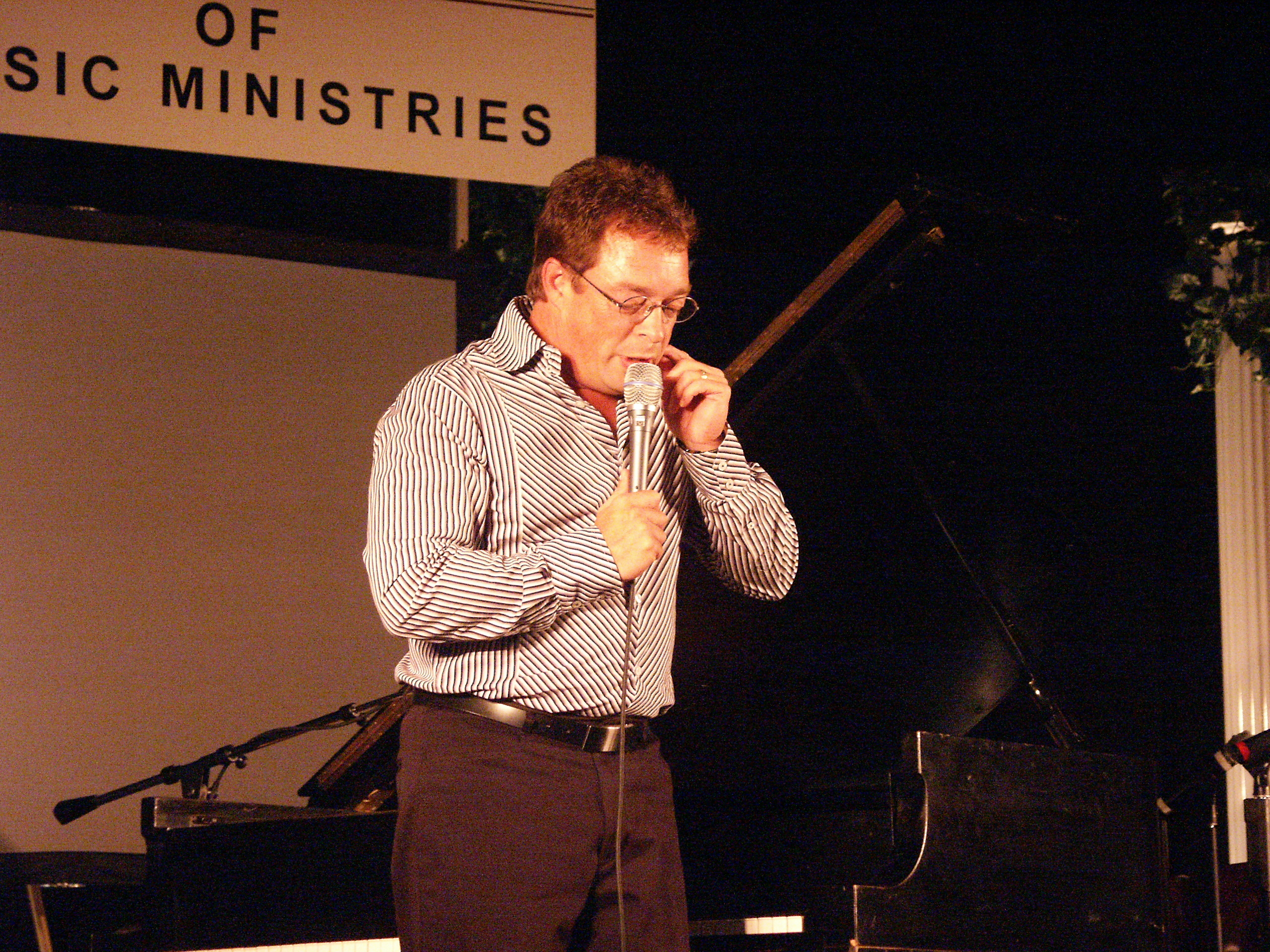
- Burger on stage in 2003

Background information
- Born: Anthony John Burger; June 5, 1961; Cleveland, Tennessee, U.S.
- Died: February 22, 2006 (aged 44) Miami, Florida, U.S.
- Genres: Southern gospel
- Instruments: Piano, vocals
- Years active: 1975–2006
- Label: Spring Hill
- Formerly of: The Kingsmen, The Celestials, The Gaither Vocal Band
- Website: anthonyburger.com

Anthony John Burger (June 5, 1961 – February 22, 2006) was an American pianist and singer, most closely associated with Southern gospel music.

== Early life ==
Anthony Burger was born in Cleveland, Tennessee to Richard and Jean Burger. At age eight months, he was using a baby walker and fell into a heating duct on the floor of his house. He suffered third degree burns on his hands, face and legs. After suffering the burns, Burger's doctor told his parents he was very likely to not be able to move his hands in the future. Despite the odds, Burger recovered. At the age of five, he was accepted at the Cadek Conservatory, University of Tennessee at Chattanooga. A child prodigy, Burger was playing classical piano repertoire within a few years. Burger attended Bradley Central High School in Cleveland.

== Career ==
Burger's first recording, Anthony Burger at the Lowrey Organ, was released in 1975 when he was 14 years old. He recorded with The Celestials on their album Ole Fashion Gospel in 1976. He joined the Kingsmen Quartet at age sixteen in August 1978 and remained with them until March 1993. During that time, Burger recorded nineteen projects with the group and was voted the Favorite Pianist in the Singing News Fan Awards for an unprecedented ten years. The award was renamed the "Anthony Burger Award" for several years after that. During this period, Burger presented the award to the winner each year, but was ineligible to receive it.

In 1993, Burger left the Kingsmen Quartet to pursue a career as a solo pianist. He joined the Gaither Homecoming Tour the following year and was featured on more than 65 Homecoming videos. Burger continued to release piano solo recordings and headline concerts, but his solo schedule was balanced by about 80 Gaither Homecoming dates per year. Adding more variety to his schedule, Burger formed an impromptu sideline group with Ivan Parker and Kirk Talley around 1998 called "The Trio." The group performed at several events each year. (Shane Dunlap later replaced Parker.)

Burger was known throughout his career to tell of how God healed his hands and playing the piano was his way of praising God. During the course of his career, Burger teamed up with gospel saxophonist Dan Traxler. Their album, "Classic Gospel", was released to streaming services including Spotify, in 2020.

Over the course of his career, Burger released a number of piano folios, permitting fellow keyboard players to perform his arrangements.

The Hazelton Brothers piano company honored Burger just after the turn of the century when they began offering an "Anthony Burger Signature" model. Then in late 2005, Steinway & Sons announced that Burger was being added to their exclusive roster of endorsing artists, making him the first Southern Gospel pianist to ever hold that honor.

== The Trio members ==
=== Line-ups ===
1998–2006

(Under the Name "The Trio")

- Kirk Talley – tenor
- Ivan Parker – lead
- Anthony Burger – baritone, piano

== Death ==
On February 22, 2006, at the age of 44, Burger died of a massive heart attack after performing aboard the MS Zuiderdam, a cruise ship chartered for a Gaither Gospel Cruise. According to eyewitnesses, Burger was accompanying Bill and Gloria Gaither and Guy Penrod when fans in the audience noticed Burger had ceased moving, his hands clenched into fists over the keyboard. Several fellow artists carried him backstage, where the cruise ship's emergency response team's attempts to perform CPR for about 45 minutes failed.

Anthony Burger's Exodus
This is a clip of Anthony Burger playing his "Exodus" at the Steve Hurst School of Music

== Awards ==
Singing News Fan Awards

- Favorite Musician (1980 to 1989)

Southern Gospel Museum and Hall of Fame

- 2007 Inductee
