= The Greenes =

American Southern gospel trio

- Origin: Boone, North Carolina
- Genres: Southern gospel
- Years active: 1979–2020
- Labels: Riversong, New Haven, Crossroads, Aca Digital

The Greenes are an American Southern gospel trio from the Boone, North Carolina, and they started making music together in 1979. They have released numerous studio albums with various labels.

== Background ==
The trio formed Boone, North Carolina during 1979, by the father of the Greene children, Everette Ralph Greene, with his three children, the eldest brother, Timothy Everette "Tim" Greene, the middle sister, Kimberly Ellen Greene, and their youngest brother, Anthony Elden "Tony" Greene. Their father played the piano as the group toured, playing at churches and other venues. Their sister would wed Dean Hopper of The Hoppers, and would leave the trio in 1989. After this time, the two brothers found Amy Lambert and Milena Parks to fill the soprano role in their group at various times. Until 1997, TaRanda Kiser joined the group fresh out of high school, after a successful audition. The group lost their founder, Everette Ralph Greene, in 2004. The younger brother, Tony Greene, died in 2010 of pneumonia, who was the husband of TaRanda Greene, having wed in February 2001. Soon thereafter, TaRanda left the group to start her full-time solo music ministry, and she is now with Cana's Voice. The three final members of the group were the eldest brother, Tim Greene, and Connor Bost and Keith Skiles.

== Music history ==
The trio has released numerous studio albums with Riversong Records, New Haven Records, Crossroads Records, Aca Digital Records.

== Members ==
1979–1984 (Under the Name "The Singing Greene Family")	1984-1987 (Under the Name "The Greenes")	1987-1989
Kim Greene – soprano; Tim Greene – lead; Tony Greene – baritone; Everette Greene - bass, piano	Kim Greene – soprano; Tim Greene – lead; Tony Greene – baritone; Everette Greene - piano; Roger Fortner – guitars; Robbie Stevens – drums	Kim Greene – soprano; Tim Greene – lead; Tony Greene – baritone
1989-1990	1990-1993	1993-1994
Amy Lambert – soprano; Tim Greene – lead; Tony Greene – baritone; James Rainey - piano; Dennis Murphy – drums	Amy Lambert – soprano; Tim Greene – lead; Tony Greene – baritone; Chris Bollinger - piano	Amy Lambert – soprano; Tim Greene – lead; Tony Greene – baritone; Jerry Kelso - piano
1994-1998	1998-2002	2002–2005
Milena Parks – soprano; Tim Greene – lead; Tony Greene – baritone	TaRanda Kiser (Greene) – soprano; Tim Greene – lead; Tony Greene – baritone	TaRanda Greene – soprano; Corey Wilson – tenor/lead; Tony Greene – baritone
2005–2008	2008-2009	2009-2010
TaRanda Greene – soprano; Brad Hudson – tenor/lead; Tony Greene – baritone; John Jeffery - piano	TaRanda Greene – soprano; Paul Lancaster – tenor/lead; Tony Greene – baritone; John Jeffery - piano	TaRanda Greene – soprano; Jeff Snyder – lead; Tony Greene – baritone; John Jeffery - piano
2010–2011 (Under the Name "The Tim Greene Trio")	2011–2012	2012-2015 (Under the Name "The Greenes")
Marc Ivey/Tony Goforth(?) – tenor; Tim Greene – lead; Stacey Saunders – baritone	Keith Skiles - tenor; Tim Greene – lead; Jason Gordon – baritone	Keith Skiles - tenor; Tim Greene – lead; Scott Mullins – baritone
2015-2017	2017–2020
Keith Skiles - tenor; Tim Greene – lead; Daniel Albritton – baritone	Keith Skiles - tenor; Tim Greene – lead; Connor Bost – baritone

== Discography ==
Albums

- Gloryland (1981)
- Child of the King (1982)
- Family Praise (1986)
- From Our Heart (1988)
- 10th Anniversary Live (1989)
- Carolina Live (1991)
- Fields of Green (1992)
- Testimony / Greatest Hits Volume 1 (1992)
- Safe in Christ (1992)
- A Home in My Heart (1992)
- It's a Sweet Life (1993)
- Mama's Heart (1995)
- The Road Home (1997)
- Memories Renewed (1997)
- And the Walls Came Down (1997)
- A Special Time (1998)
- Greatest Hits Volume 2 (1999)
- Wonderful Story (1999)
- So Happy (2000)
- Glory Mountain (2001)
- Whosoever Believes (2004)
- God Is A Good God (2006)
- The First Christmas Tree (2011)
- We Need America Again (2012)
- Sweet Freedom (2013)
- Legacy (2014)
- Blessing (2017)
- Hallelujah (2020)
