= Devin McGlamery =

American Christian musician (born 1982)

- Born: Jon Devin McGlamery; June 9, 1982 (age 44); Valdosta, Georgia
- Origin: Nashville, Tennessee
- Genres: Southern gospel, Christian
- Occupations: Singer, songwriter
- Instrument: vocals
- Years active: 2000–present
- Label: Stow Town
- Website: devinmcglamery.com

Jon Devin McGlamery (born June 9, 1982) is an American Christian music and Gospel Music recording artist and GMA Dove Award-winning artist. He is a former tenor member of Karen Peck and New River and former lead vocalist for the Dixie Melody Boys and Ernie Haase and Signature Sound.

== Early life ==
McGlamery was born on June 9, 1982, in Valdosta, Georgia, the son of Donald and Sandra McGlamery, where he grew up and was raised before starting his professional music career.

== Music career ==
McGlamery was first a member of the southern gospel quartet The Dixie Melody Boys out of Kinston, North Carolina, from 2000 until 2004. He left to join another southern gospel act, the mixed trio Karen Peck and New River from 2004 until 2009 as a tenor singer. In 2010, He became a member of Ernie Haase & Signature Sound in 2010 and remained until the end of October 2021.

He won a GMA Dove Award, for the song, "From My Rags to His Riches", in the category of Country Recorded Song of the Year, with the Ernie Haase & Signature Sound band.

His solo music recording career started in 2013, with the studio album, Love is a Verb, that was released on May 20, 2013, by Stow Town Records. He was nominated for two GMA Dove Awards, for his solo work, in 2014.

== Discography ==
=== Solo ===
- 2013 Love is a Verb
