= Ernie Haase & Signature Sound =

2002 Southern Gospel Quartet by Ernie Haase

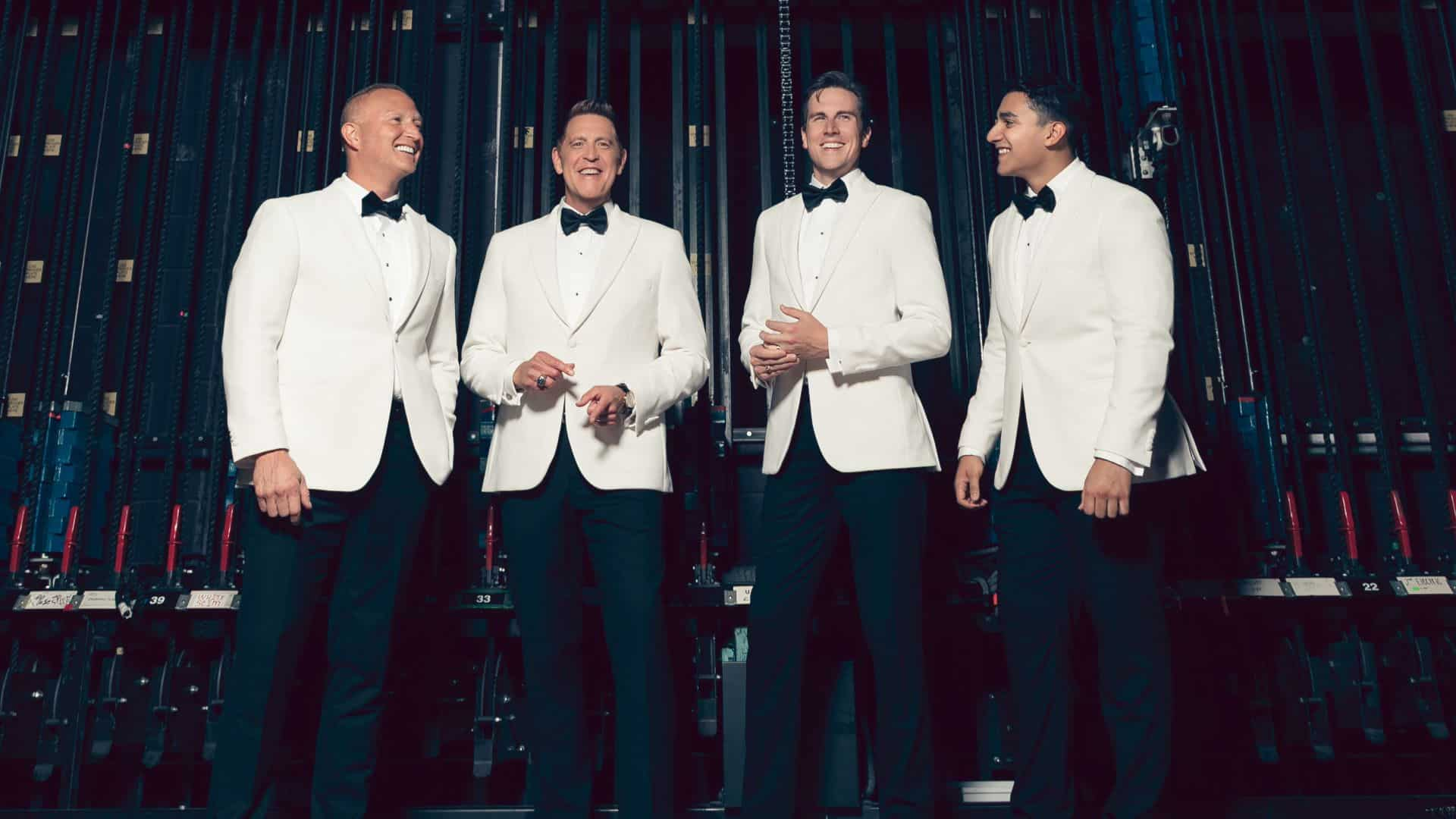
- (l-r) Doug Anderson, Ernie Haase, Dustin Doyle, Christopher Taylor

Background information
- Also known as: The Signature Sound Quartet (2002-2004)
- Origin: Frankfort, Ohio, United States
- Genres: Southern Gospel, Christian, Inspirational
- Years active: 2002–present
- Label: Provident Music
- Members: Ernie Haase; Doug Anderson; Dustin Doyle; Christopher Taylor
- Past members: Tim Duncan; Devin McGlamery; Shane Dunlap; Ryan Seaton; Wesley Pritchard; Garry Jones; Roy Webb; Gordon Mote; Wayne Haun; Ian Owens; Paul Harkey; Tyler Vestal
- Website: www.erniehaase.com

Ernie Haase & Signature Sound (formerly known as The Signature Sound Quartet) is an American Southern gospel quartet founded in 2002 by Ernie Haase, former Cathedral Quartet tenor, and Garry Jones, former Gold City pianist. As of 2026, the group consists of Ernie Haase (tenor), Doug Anderson (baritone), Dustin Doyle (lead), Christopher Taylor (bass), and Braden Neal (piano). The group has released 37 albums and 18 DVDs, many of which feature other Christian and gospel artists.

== History ==
=== Origin ===
In 1999, the Cathedral Quartet announced their farewell tour due to the ongoing health issues of George Younce and Glen Payne. Lead singer Glen Payne died on October 15, 1999, before the end of the tour. Upon request of Glen Payne, the remaining members finished the tour with pianist Roger Bennett performing Payne's vocals. Following the tour Bennett and baritone Scott Fowler formed Legacy Five while Ernie Haase continued his solo career.

Subsequently, former Cathedrals bass George Younce and Jake Hess, along with Bill Gaither formed The Old Friends Quartet with Ernie Haase, Wesley Pritchard, and Garry Jones. The Old Friends Quartet disbanded after about two years on the road, however, as Hess and Younce's ill health prevented them from doing much traveling. Ernie Haase, along with Jones, continued quartet singing and wished to create a quartet with a modern image and attitude, but traditional in sound. Haase and Jones, together with lead singer Shane Dunlap, baritone Doug Anderson, and bass singer Tim Duncan formed the Signature Sound Quartet. They recorded three albums, Stand by Me released in 2003, followed by Building a Bridge and Glory To His Name. They participated in their first live concert (Live in Indiana) at Reardon Auditorium, in Anderson, Indiana, on February 21, 2003.

=== 2003–04 ===
Later Shane Dunlap left Signature Sound to start a solo career after release of their third album Glory to His Name in 2003. Wesley Pritchard took Dunlap's position while the group searched for a full-time lead. Jones and Haase dissolved their business relationship after the first year and Roy Webb was chosen as pianist. Later, they found Ryan Seaton (formerly of The Melody Boys Quartet) and hired him as the new lead singer. Haase's father-in-law George Younce became co-owner of the quartet and helped the group have an affiliation with the Gaither Music Group. In 2004, they released their fourth album, The Ground is Level, followed by Great Love, a DVD/album called Stand By Me - LIVE which was the first video to featured both Seaton and Webb and then their first Christmas album, Christmas with Ernie Haase and Signature Sound.

=== Name change ===
In 2004, the group changed its name to Ernie Haase and Signature Sound, reportedly in order to avoid confusion with other similarly titled regional groups. They released their self-titled album in October 2005. They signed with the Gaither Music Group and became regular performers with the Gaither Homecoming tours and videos. In May 2007, pianist Roy Webb left the band to be with his father, who was dying of cancer. On May 29, 2007, it was announced that Webb had resigned from the group. Later, it was announced that Gordon Mote would be the group's piano player during their Get Away Jordan summer tour supporting their album Get Away, Jordan released in January 2007.

Singer and producer Bill Gaither eventually began scheduling a second series of concerts with only Signature Sound and the Gaither Vocal Band appearing together. Due in part to the popularity of these concerts, the two groups decided to record a single album together, entitled Together, which debuted in October 2007. On the DVD, it was hinted that future collaborations between Signature Sound and the Vocal Band were upcoming. Producer and songwriter Wayne Haun has served as their pianist since their 2008 Summer tour. The group's next project was entitled, Dream On. This was released in late October 2008 and was filmed in Chicago, at the Navy Pier Ballroom.

=== The Cathedrals Tributes ===
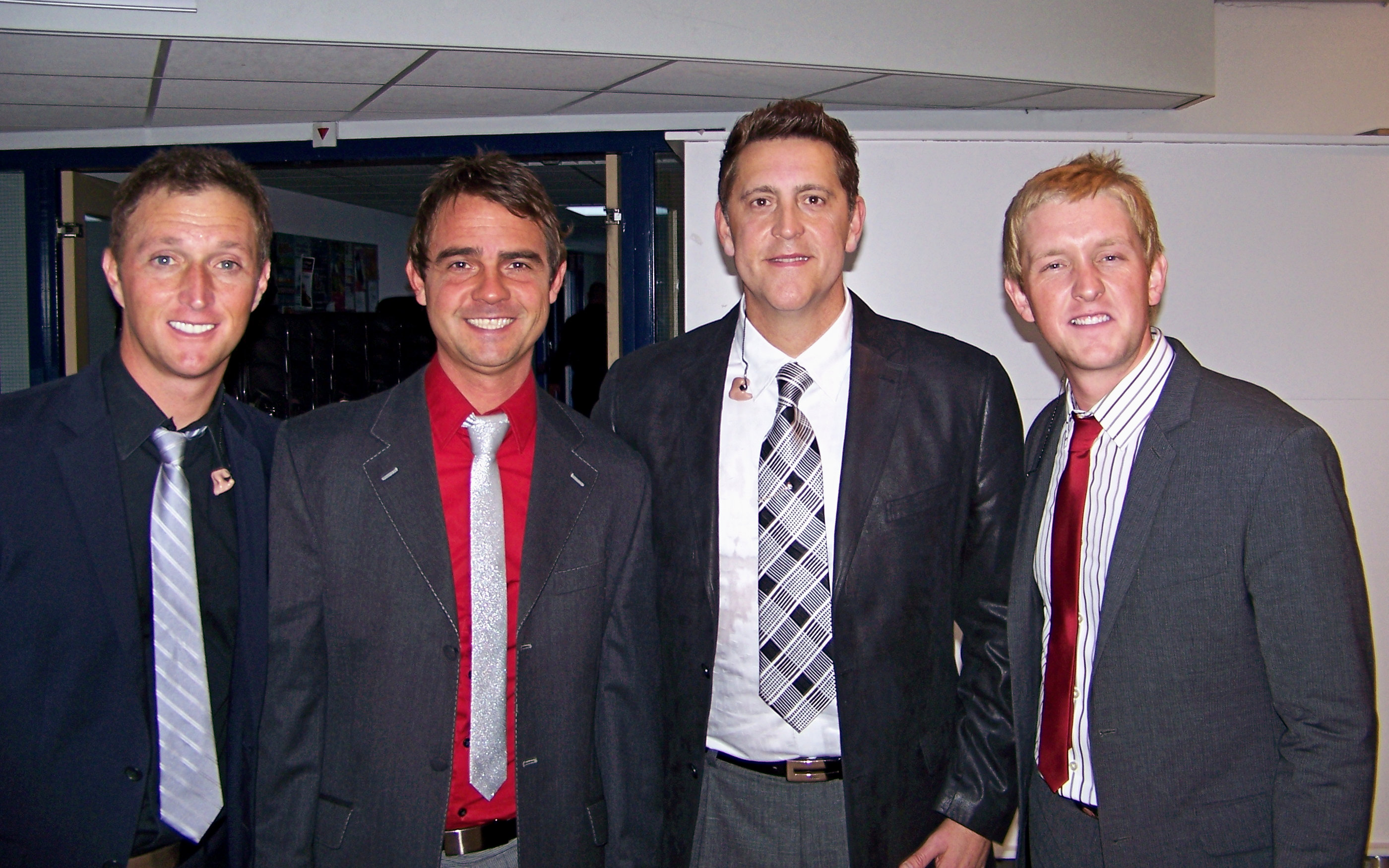
Left to right: Anderson, Duncan, Haase and McGlamery in 2010

In January 2009, Ernie Haase announced a Cathedrals tribute tour was next on the quartet's agenda and the group started touring with a live band that included Wayne Haun on the piano, David Griffith on the bass, Kelly Vaughan on electric guitar and Zak Shumate on the drums. In September 2009, following a three-year hiatus from the National Quartet Convention, Haase and Signature Sound returned to performing there along with the rest of the Gaither Homecoming performers. Haase was unable to appear with former Cathedrals members Scott Fowler, Gerald Wolfe, Mark Trammell, and Danny Funderburk for a NQC special showcase presentation called The Cathedrals Remembered, a tribute concert at the convention in which the former Cathedral members joined forces to sing many old Cathedral songs and to honor George Younce and Glen Payne. Haase had other engagements over the weekend and had to leave NQC early, prior to the taping.

In October 2009 the group released a second Christmas album entitled Every Light That Shines At Christmas which was the final album to feature Ryan Seaton. They also released a DVD video of the same title which was recorded LIVE for the Gospel Music Channel. On December 28, 2009, Ernie announced that Ryan Seaton was leaving the quartet after 6 years to pursue other interests and that former Karen Peck and New River lead/tenor Devin McGlamery would be joining as the new lead singer, and they released A Tribute to the Cathedral Quartet in October 2010.

=== 2011–15 ===
On January 18, 2011, it was announced that bass singer Tim Duncan had left after 8 years, and Ian Owens had joined the group as the new bass singer for the group. The group released a new project called Here We Are Again in February 2012. In October 2012, Ian Owens announced his resignation after 2 years and later joined Soul'd Out Quartet, and Paul Harkey joined as the new bass singer. In April 2015, Doug Anderson announced in a video with Haase that he will be stepping down from his position in Signature Sound to pursue a full-time solo career. Anderson had been with the group as its baritone singer since its inception in 2002, a total of 13 years. It was later announced that Dustin Doyle of Beyond The Ashes will be replacing Anderson in the Baritone part.

=== 2020–present ===
In June 2020, Haase had suspended their touring schedule due to the COVID-19 pandemic. Later they created the Living Room Sing to which they sang songs from their Something Beautiful album. On September 11, they renamed it to Friday Night Sing, a 16 episodes series of stories and songs which featured many special guests. It premiered every Friday night from September 11 to December 25, 2020. In March 2021, Haase announced that on March 12 they will continue their touring schedule. The group then released Keeping On on July 23, 2021. The album was the final project to feature Devin McGlamery as it was announced on September 14, 2021, that he would be leaving the group at the end of October after 11 years and Doug Anderson would be rejoining the group in November 2021. In October 2021, they created a second season of the Friday Night Sing called Good To Be Home, a 10 episodes series. Just like the first season, they shared stories and sang songs from their Keeping On album and it too feature some special guests. The show premiered every Friday night from October 8 to December 10, 2021.

In 2022, the group crossed genres and recorded a traditional pop album called Decades of Love, an album of standard pop love songs that were covered by the group spanning nearly 10 decades. The album was released on August 5, 2022. The project originally was dedicated to the wives of the group's members, but became a successful album by being a top 10 pop music release on iTunes the week it was released. The group continues to be one of the top acts in the Gospel and Christian music field. In 2023, the group celebrated 20 years by recording a live album in Amsterdam entitled Live in Amsterdam: A 20th Anniversary Celebration which was released on August 10, 2023. The album features some of the groups most popular songs. This was the final album to feature Paul Harkey.

In February 2024, they created a third season of the Friday Night Sing, a 6 episodes series. In this season, each member shared stories about their families and their journey with the group. All Friday Night Sing episodes (including Good To Be Home) were live-streamed on YouTube. They sang songs from their Live in Amsterdam album including some hymns. The show premiered every Friday night from February 2 to March 8, 2024. On April 23, it was announced that Paul Harkey will step down from the group after 12 years at the end of May 2024 and that Christopher Taylor became the new bass singer on June 15. On October 4, 2024, they released a DVD/CD album called Live in Memphis. It was recorded at the Memphis Quartet Show in Memphis, Tennessee. On April 27, 2025 original pianist Garry Jones died aged 62 after a brief battle with metastatic cancer. On February 23, 2026, it was announced that pianist Tyler Vestal will step down from the group after 11 years at the end of March 2026. He was hired as Band Director at Lee Park Church in Monroe, North Carolina

In May of 2026 it was announced that a reunion of sorts would be taking place at the annual "Fan Retreat" in Sugarcreek, Ohio at The Ohio Star Theater. On June 5-6, 2026 former members Tim Duncan, Ryan Seaton (who had recently been declared cancer free following a year and a half battle) and Roy Webb joined Ernie, Doug Anderson, Dustin Doyle and Christopher Taylor for two concerts entitled "Then & Now".

== Members (past and present) ==
=== Lineups ===
2002–2003 (Under the Name "Signature Sound Quartet")	2003	2003–2004
Ernie Haase – tenor; Shane Dunlap – lead; Doug Anderson – baritone; Tim Duncan – bass; Garry Jones – piano	Ernie Haase – tenor; Wesley Pritchard – lead; Doug Anderson – baritone; Tim Duncan – bass; Roy Webb – piano	Ernie Haase – tenor; Ryan Seaton – lead; Doug Anderson – baritone; Tim Duncan – bass; Roy Webb – piano
2004–2007 (Under the Name "Ernie Haase & Signature Sound")	2007	2008
Ernie Haase – tenor; Ryan Seaton – lead; Doug Anderson – baritone; Tim Duncan – bass; Roy Webb – piano	Ernie Haase – tenor; Ryan Seaton – lead; Doug Anderson – baritone; Tim Duncan – bass; Gordon Mote – piano	Ernie Haase – tenor; Ryan Seaton – lead; Doug Anderson – baritone; Tim Duncan – bass; Wayne Haun – piano
2009	2010–2011	2011–2012
Ernie Haase – tenor; Ryan Seaton – lead; Doug Anderson – baritone; Tim Duncan – bass; Wayne Haun – piano, vocals; David Griffith – bass guitar; Greg Ritchie – drums	Ernie Haase – tenor; Devin McGlamery – lead; Doug Anderson – baritone; Tim Duncan – bass; Wayne Haun – piano; David Griffith – bass guitar; Kelly Vaughn – guitars; Zak Shumate – drums	Ernie Haase – tenor; Devin McGlamery – lead; Doug Anderson – baritone; Ian Owens – bass; Wayne Haun – piano; David Griffith – bass guitar; Kelly Vaughn – guitars; Zak Shumate – drums
2012–2013	2013–2015	2015–2019
Ernie Haase – tenor; Devin McGlamery – lead; Doug Anderson – baritone; Paul Harkey – bass; Wayne Haun – piano; David Griffith – bass guitar; Zak Shumate – drums	Ernie Haase – tenor; Devin McGlamery – lead; Doug Anderson – baritone; Paul Harkey – bass; Wayne Haun – piano; David Griffith – bass guitar	Ernie Haase - tenor; Devin McGlamery - lead; Dustin Doyle - baritone; Paul Harkey - bass; Tyler Vestal - piano; David Griffith – bass guitar
2019–2021	2021–2024	2024–2026
Ernie Haase - tenor; Devin McGlamery - lead; Dustin Doyle - baritone; Paul Harkey - bass; Tyler Vestal - piano; Wes Jones – bass guitar	Ernie Haase – tenor; Dustin Doyle – lead; Doug Anderson – baritone; Paul Harkey – bass; Tyler Vestal – piano; Wes Jones – bass guitar	Ernie Haase - tenor; Dustin Doyle – lead; Doug Anderson – baritone; Christopher Taylor - bass; Tyler Vestal - piano; Wes Jones – bass guitar
2026–present
Ernie Haase - tenor; Dustin Doyle – lead; Doug Anderson – baritone; Christopher Taylor - bass; Braden Tyler Neal - piano; Wes Jones – bass guitar

== Cathedrals Family Reunion members ==
=== Line-ups ===
2009 (under the name "Cathedrals Remember The Music")	2010	2012
Danny Funderburk – tenor; Scott Fowler – lead; Mark Trammell – baritone, bass guitar; Glenn Dustin – bass; Tim Parton – piano; Gerald Wolfe – piano, vocals	Chris Allman – tenor; Scott Fowler – lead; Mark Trammell – baritone, bass guitar; Glenn Dustin – bass; Gerald Wolfe – piano	Ernie Haase – tenor; Scott Fowler – lead; Mark Trammell – baritone, bass guitar; Glenn Dustin – bass; Gerald Wolfe – piano, vocals
2013–2014 (under the name "Cathedrals Family Reunion")
Danny Funderburk – tenor; Ernie Haase – tenor; Scott Fowler – lead; Mark Trammell – baritone, bass guitar; Pat Barker – bass; Matt Fouch – bass; Paul Harkey – bass; Trey Ivey – piano; Gerald Wolfe – piano, vocals

== Discography ==
- 2003: Stand by Me
- 2003: Building a Bridge – Great Quartet Songs of the Last Century Vol.I
- 2003: Glory to His Name – Great Quartet Songs of the Last Century Vol.II
- 2004: The Ground Is Level – Great Quartet Songs of the Last Century Vol.III
- 2004: Great Love
- 2004: Stand by Me – Live
- 2004: Christmas with Ernie Haase & Signature Sound
- 2005: Ernie Haase & Signature Sound
- 2007: Get Away, Jordan
- 2007: Together – Recorded with the Gaither Vocal Band
- 2008: Dream On – Grammy Award nomination
- 2008: Influenced: A Vintage Quartet Session
- 2008: The Early Years (2-CD Set)
- 2009: Every Light That Shines at Christmas
- 2010: Influenced: Spirituals & Southern Classics
- 2010: A Tribute to the Cathedral Quartet
- 2011: George Younce with Ernie Haase & Signature Sound
- 2011: A White Christmas
- 2012: California Live – Vol.1
- 2012: California Live – Vol.2
- 2012: Here We Are Again
- 2013: Glorious Day
- 2013: Christmas Live!
- 2014: Oh, What a Savior
- 2015: The Inspiration of Broadway
- 2015: Happy People
- 2016: The Favorite Hymns of Fanny Crosby
- 2018: Clear Skies
- 2019: A Jazzy Little Christmas
- 2020: Something Beautiful: Our Favorite Songs of Bill & Gloria Gaither
- 2020: Brotherhood - Recorded with the Booth Brothers
- 2021: Keeping On
- 2022: Decades of Love
- 2023: Live in Amsterdam: A 20th Anniversary Celebration
- 2024: Live in Memphis
- 2025: A Jazzy Little Christmas: Live at Birdland
- 2026: America: Land of Hopes and Dreams

== Video ==
Year	Title	Members who performed
2003	Live In Indiana	Ernie Haase, Shane Dunlap, Doug Anderson, Tim Duncan, Garry Jones
2004	Stand by Me: Live	E. Haase, D. Anderson, T. Duncan, Ryan Seaton, Roy Webb
2005	Ernie Haase & Signature Sound	E. Haase, D. Anderson, T. Duncan, Ryan Seaton, Roy Webb
2007	Get Away, Jordan	E. Haase, D. Anderson, T. Duncan, Ryan Seaton, Roy Webb
2007	Together (with Gaither Vocal Band)	E. Haase, D. Anderson, T. Duncan, R. Seaton
2008	Dream On: Live from Chicago	E. Haase, D. Anderson, T. Duncan, R. Seaton
2009	Every Light That Shines At Christmas LIVE	E. Haase, D. Anderson, T. Duncan, R. Seaton
2010	A Tribute to the Cathedral Quartet	E. Haase, D. Anderson, T. Duncan, Devin McGlamery
2012	This Is Ernie Haase & Signature Sound	E. Haase, D. Anderson, D. McGlamery, Ian Owens
2013	Christmas LIVE!	E. Haase, D. Anderson, D. McGlamery, Paul Harkey
2014	Oh, What A Savior	E. Haase, D. Anderson, D. McGlamery, Paul Harkey
2015	The Inspiration of Broadway (with J. Mark McVey)	E. Haase, D. Anderson, D. McGlamery, Paul Harkey
2015	Happy People	E. Haase, D. Anderson, D. McGlamery, Paul Harkey
2018	Clear Skies LIVE at Bossier City, LA	E. Haase, D. McGlamery, P. Harkey, Dustin Doyle
2022	Keeping On Live	E. Haase, P. Harkey, D. Doyle, Doug Anderson
2022	Something Beautiful	E. Haase, P. Harkey, D. Doyle, Doug Anderson
2024	Live In Memphis	E. Haase, D. Doyle, D. Anderson, Christopher Taylor

=== Appearances on other DVDs ===
- 2005: Gaither Vocal Band: Give It Away - "Glory, Glory Clear The Road", "Heavenly Parade" and "Give It Away"
- 2009: Gaither Vocal Band: Reunion Vol. 1 & 2 - Did not perform but Ernie Haase and Tim Duncan joined in on "Oh, What a Time"
- 2009: The Oak Ridge Boys: A Gospel Journey - Did not perform but Tim Duncan joined in on "Elvira" with Richard Sterban.

==== Gaither Homecoming video performances ====
- 2005: Israel Homecoming - "Holy Highway" (with Gaither Vocal Band), "This Could Be The Dawning Of That Day/Until Then" and "River Of Jordan" (with Jeff & Sheri Easter, Charlotte Ritchie)
- 2005: Jerusalem Homecoming - "He Is Jehovah"
- 2006: Canadian Homecoming - "Stand By Me", "Holy Highway" (with Gaither Vocal Band) and "Then Came The Morning"
- 2006: Live From Toronto - "Glory To God In The Highest" and "This Could Be The Dawning Of That Day/Until Then"
- 2006: Homecoming Christmas - "Tonight", "Forgiven Again" and "Give It Away" (with Gaither Vocal Band)
- 2007: Amazing Grace - "I Then Shall Live" (with Gaither Vocal Band)
- 2007: South African Homecoming - "Stand By Me" and "Oh, What A Savior"
- 2007: Love Can Turn The World - "Trying To Get A Glimpse"
- 2008: Country Bluegrass Homecoming Vol. 1 - "Reason Enough"
- 2008: Country Bluegrass Homecoming Vol. 2 - "Climbing Up The Mountain"
- 2009: Joy in My Heart - "Someday"
- 2017: Sweeter As The Days Go By - "I Do Believe"
- 2025: Heavenly Love - "Hard Trials Will Soon Be Over" (with Gaither Vocal Band, Chris Blue and Gene McDonald)

== Awards ==
=== GMA Dove Awards ===
Year	Award	Result
2006	New Artist of the Year	Nominated
2006	Southern Gospel Album of the Year (Ernie Haase & Signature Sound)	Nominated
2008	Group of the Year	Nominated
2008	Southern Gospel Album of the Year (Get Away, Jordan)	Won
2008	Southern Gospel Recorded Song of the Year ("Get Away Jordan")	Won
2008	Long Form Music Video of the Year (Get Away, Jordan)	Nominated
2009	Group of the Year	Nominated
2009	Male Vocalist of the Year (Ernie Haase)	Nominated
2009	Song of the Year ("Reason Enough")	Nominated
2009	Southern Gospel Recorded Song of the Year ("Reason Enough")	Won
2010	Country Recorded Song of the Year ("Thank God for Kids")	Nominated
2010	Christmas Album of the Year (Every Light That Shines at Christmas)	Nominated
2011	Artist of the Year	Nominated
2011	Group of the Year	Nominated
2011	Southern Gospel Recorded Song of the Year ("I Thirst")	Nominated
2011	Southern Gospel Album of the Year (A Tribute to the Cathedral Quartet)	Nominated
2011	Long Form Music Video of the Year (A Tribute to the Cathedral Quartet)	Nominated
2012	Song of the Year (I've Been Here Before)	Nominated
2012	Southern Gospel Recorded Song of the Year (I've Been Here Before)	Nominated
2015	Southern Gospel Artist of the Year	Nominated
2015	Southern Gospel Song of the Year (Happy People)	Nominated
2016	Southern Gospel Artist of the Year	Nominated
2016	Southern Gospel Recorded Song of the Year (Jesus Changed Everything)	Nominated
2016	Southern Gospel Album of the Year (Happy People)	Nominated
2017	Southern Gospel Artist of the Year	Nominated
2018	Southern Gospel Recorded Song of the Year (Clear Skies)	Nominated
2018	Southern Gospel Album of the Year (Clear Skies)	Nominated
2019	Southern Gospel Artist of the Year	Nominated
2019	Southern Gospel Recorded Song of the Year (Longing For Home)	Nominated
2020	Southern Gospel Artist of the Year	Nominated
2021	Southern Gospel Artist of the Year	Won
2021	Southern Gospel Recorded Song of the Year (Wake Up)	Nominated
2022	Southern Gospel Recorded Song of the Year (Overcome)	Nominated
2022	Southern Gospel Album of the Year (Keeping On)	Won
2023	Southern Gospel Recorded Song of the Year (I Know My Savior Cares)	Nominated
2024	Southern Gospel Recorded Song of the Year (Until We Fly Away)	Nominated
2024	Southern Gospel Album of the Year (Live in Amsterdam)	Won
2025	Southern Gospel Recorded Song of the Year (You're Find Him There)	Nominated
2025	Southern Gospel Album of the Year (Live in Memphis)	Nominated

=== Grammy Awards ===
Year	Award	Result
2010	Best Southern/Country/Bluegrass Gospel Album (Dream On)	Nominated
2019	Best Roots Gospel Album (Clear Skies)	Nominated
2021	Best Roots Gospel Album (Something Beautiful)	Nominated
2022	Best Roots Gospel Album (Keeping On)	Nominated
