= The Hoppers =

American Southern Gospel family ensemble

- Origin: North Carolina
- Genres: Southern gospel, Contemporary Christian
- Years active: 1957–present
- Website: thehoppers.com

The Hoppers are an American Southern gospel singing group from North Carolina. Their music combines Southern gospel with Pop, country, and rock music.

== History ==
The Hoppers are a family ensemble which first began performing together in 1957. They appeared at the inauguration ceremony for Ronald Reagan in 1981. They won awards for Mixed Vocal Group from the Southern Gospel Music Association in 1982 and 1983. Both Claude and Connie Hopper have been inducted into the Southern Gospel Music Hall of Fame in 2014 (Claude) and 2010 (Connie) respectively. In addition, the Hoppers were inducted into the Gospel Music Association Hall of Fame in 2012.

Kim Greene of The Greenes joined the group in 1989 after marrying vocalist and former drummer Dean Hopper the year before. Their first major hit at Christian radio was "Here I Am", in 1990; they would score many further hits, including "Grace Will Always Be Greater”," "Mention My Name”, ”Blame It On Love”, “The Ride”, "Hope”," "I've Come Too Far”, “He Didn't Just Carry the Cross", "That's Him," and "Yes I Am" and their most successful single to date "Jerusalem" for which they recorded a live video in 2004 from the city itself. The Hoppers continued up until 2025 with the same core members for 36 years until Claude and Connie retired.

Mike Hopper married Denice in 1996, who became the group's pianist. In 1998, their version of "Shoutin' Time" was a commercial success, and the group performed with Bill and Gloria Gaither. They won several further Southern Gospel Music Awards in following years. In addition, member Connie Hopper won the career Marvin Norcross Award in 1998. They also performed on the album Tribute To Dottie Rambo, which was a nominee for "Special Event Album of the Year" at the Dove Awards of 1999.

The group has appeared on the Gaither Homecoming tour frequently, and Claude and Dean Hopper are members of the board of directors of the North Carolina Gospel Music Hall of Fame. Mike Hopper appeared in the ”Touched by an Angel" episode titled “Band of Angels.”

In 2007, the Hoppers signed to the shortly revived Canaan Record Label. Their release, "The Ride", was originally recorded independently, then re-released on the Canaan label. January 2009 brought the first recording under the Canaan umbrella titled, "North America, Live!". With distribution under the Spring Hill Music Group label, the Hoppers released "Something's Happening" in August 2010. Gaither Music Group released "The Best of The Hoppers" in 2010, compiling some of their best loved performances from the Gaither Homecoming Series. Original bass singer Monroe Hopper died on May 17, 2013 in Madison, NC.

Since 2011 the Hoppers have released several albums including: "Hymns: A Classic Collection" (2011), "Count Me In" (2012), "Kids" (2014), "Life Is Good" (2016), "Honor The First Families Of Gospel Music" (2018) and most recently "Believe" (2022).

Kim Hopper has released three solo projects, "Imagine" (2003) under the Spring Hill Label, "I Just Wanted You To Know" (August 2008) with Canaan Records, and most recently "Softly & Tenderly" (2021) with KGH Records.

When Claude and Connie Hopper announced their retirement in 2025, this ended the group's original four-part harmony stretch since 1989 and endorsed the new trio composition of the group composed of Kim, Dean and Karlye Hopper.

== Awards and recognition ==
=== Group ===
- Singing News Favorite Mixed Group Award 1997-98-99-00-01-02-03-05-08-09-10-11
- Mixed Vocal Group SGMA 1982-83-98-99-00-01
- "Hearts-A-Flame" Mixed Group Award 95-96-97
- Singing News Favorite Artist Web Site 2005
- Dove Award for Children's Music Album of the Year in 2014 for "Kids"
- Dove Award for Southern Gospel Album Of The Year in 2023 for "Believe"
- GMA Hall Of Fame Induction in 2012

=== Connie ===
- Singing News Favorite Alto Award: 1998-99-00-15-16-17-18-19-20-22-23-24
- Marvin Norcross Award in 1998
- Singing News Queen of Gospel Music (a.k.a. Female Vocalist Of The Year) 1983-84
- Person of the year 2005
- Inducted into the Southern Gospel Music Association Hall Of Fame in 2010

=== Kim ===
- Singing News Female Vocalist "Hearts-A-Flame": 1995-96-97
- SGMA Female Vocalist 99
- Singing News Young Artist 1990
- Singing News Soprano: 1997-98-99-00-01-02-03-04-05-06-07-08-09-10-11-12-13-14-15-16-17-18-19-20-21
- Female Vocalist Singing News: 1999-00-01-03-06-07-08-09-10-11-12-14-15
- Female Vocalist Voice Diamonds 99

=== Michael ===
- Singing News Favorite Musician Non-Pianist 2001

== Members ==
=== Line-ups ===
1957–1958 (Under the Name "Hopper Brothers")	1958-1970 (Under the Name "Hopper Brothers & Connie")	1970-1971	1971-1972
Will Hopper – tenor; Steve Hopper – lead; Claude Hopper – baritone; Monroe Hopper - bass	Will Hopper – tenor; Steve Hopper – lead; Claude Hopper – baritone; Monroe Hopper - bass; Connie Shelton (Hopper) – piano (occasional alto)	Connie Hopper – alto; Will Hopper – tenor; Rex Foster – lead, piano; Claude Hopper – baritone; Monroe Hopper - bass	Connie Hopper – alto; Will Hopper – tenor; Claude Hopper – baritone; Monroe Hopper - bass; Johnny Porrazo - piano; Lee Chilton - bass guitar
1972-1974	1974-1976	1976-1977	1977-1978
Connie Hopper – alto; Will Hopper – tenor; Claude Hopper – baritone; Lee Chilton - bass, steel guitar; Johnny Porrazo - piano; Bob All – guitars; Barry McGee – drums	Connie Hopper – alto; Will Hopper – tenor; Claude Hopper – baritone; Lee Chilton - bass, steel guitar; Roger Talley - piano; Bob All – guitars; Barry McGee – drums	Connie Hopper – alto; Will Hopper – tenor; Kirk Talley – tenor; Steve Hopper – lead; Claude Hopper – baritone; Roger Talley - piano; Bob All – guitars; Dean Hopper – drums	Connie Hopper – alto; Will Hopper – tenor; Kirk Talley – tenor; Claude Hopper – baritone; Roger Talley - piano; Bob All – guitars; Dean Hopper – drums
1978-1980	1980	1980-1982	1982
Debra Talley – soprano; Connie Hopper – alto; Will Hopper – tenor; Kirk Talley – tenor; Claude Hopper – baritone; Roger Talley - piano; Bob All – guitars; Dean Hopper – drums	Debra Talley – soprano; Connie Hopper – alto; Will Hopper – tenor; Claude Hopper – baritone; Roger Talley - piano; Reb Lancaster – bass guitar; Bob All – guitars; Dean Hopper – drums	Debra Talley – soprano; Connie Hopper – alto; Will Hopper – tenor; Claude Hopper – baritone; Roger Talley - piano; Reb Lancaster – bass guitar; Dean Hopper – drums	Debra Talley – soprano; Connie Hopper – alto; Will Hopper – tenor; Claude Hopper – baritone; Roger Talley - piano; Dean Hopper – drums; Roger Fortner – guitar, vocals
1982-1983 (Under the Name "The Hoppers")	1983-1984	1984-1985	1985-1989
Debra Talley – soprano; Connie Hopper – alto; Dean Hopper – lead; Claude Hopper – baritone; Mike Hopper - drums; Roger Talley - piano	Connie Hopper – alto; Dean Hopper – lead; Claude Hopper – baritone; Mike Hopper - bass, drums; Steve Keen - piano, vocals	Sharon Watts - soprano; Connie Hopper – alto; Dean Hopper – lead; Claude Hopper – baritone; Mike Hopper - bass, drums; Steve Keen - piano, vocals	Sharon Watts - soprano; Greg Bentley – tenor; Connie Hopper – alto; Dean Hopper – lead; Claude Hopper – baritone; Mike Hopper - bass, drums; Shannon Childress - piano
1989-1998	1998-2002	2003-2005	2005
Kim Greene (Hopper) - soprano; Connie Hopper – alto; Dean Hopper – lead; Claude Hopper – baritone; Mike Hopper - bass, drums; Shannon Childress - piano; (Taylor Barnes and Frank Mills alternated playing bass guitar for the group based on availability)	Kim Hopper - soprano; Connie Hopper – alto; Dean Hopper – lead; Claude Hopper – baritone; Mike Hopper - bass, drums; Denice Hopper - piano	Kim Hopper - soprano; Connie Hopper – alto; Dean Hopper – lead; Claude Hopper – baritone; Mike Hopper - bass, drums; Josh Simpson - piano	Kim Hopper - soprano; Connie Hopper – alto; Dean Hopper – lead; Claude Hopper – baritone; Mike Hopper - bass, drums
2006-2008	2008-2010	2011-2015	2015-2017
Kim Hopper - soprano; Connie Hopper – alto; Dean Hopper – lead; Claude Hopper – baritone; Mike Hopper - bass, drums; Lewis Wells - piano	Karlye Hopper - vocals; Kim Hopper - soprano; Connie Hopper – alto; Dean Hopper – lead; Claude Hopper – baritone; Mike Hopper - bass, drums; Jacob Crisp - piano	Kim Hopper - soprano; Karlye Hopper - alto; Connie Hopper – alto; Dean Hopper – lead; Claude Hopper – baritone; Mike Hopper - bass, drums; Josh Simpson - piano	Kim Hopper - soprano; Karlye Hopper - alto; Connie Hopper – alto; Nathan Kistler – tenor (toured only); Dean Hopper – lead; Claude Hopper – baritone; Mike Hopper - bass, drums; Trevor Conkle - piano
2017–2025	2025-present
Kim Hopper - soprano; Karlye Hopper - alto; Connie Hopper – alto; Dean Hopper – lead; Claude Hopper – baritone; Mike Hopper - bass, drums	Kim Hopper - soprano; Karlye Hopper - alto; Dean Hopper - lead

=== Hopper Brothers 2.0 ===
2015–2016 (Under the Name "Hopper Brothers 2.0")	2016
Nathan Kistler – tenor; Matt Griffith – lead; Dean Hopper – baritone; Mike Hopper - bass	Reggie Smith – tenor; Matt Griffith – lead; Dean Hopper – baritone; Mike Hopper - bass

== Discography ==
Hopper Brothers and Connie

- "Gospel Favorites" (HopperSing Records, 1962)
- "5th Anniversary" (HopperSing Records, 1963)
- "The Best of the Hopper Brothers and Connie" (HopperSing Records, 1968)
- "Try A Little Kindness" (HopperSingRecords, 1969)
- "Just Old Time Christians" (HopperSing Records, 1971)
- "The Unseen Hand" (HopperSing Records, 1972)
- "Jesus Taught Our Hearts To Sing" (Calvary Records, 1972)
- "Our Kind of Gospel" (Calvary Records, 1973)
- "Sing For...Impact International" (HopperSing Records, 1973)
- "Sing Gospel Classics" (Trail Records, 1974)
- "Thank God For The Old Rugged Cross" (Trail Records, 1974)
- "Greater Than Before" (Supreme Records, 1974)
- "A Live and a Singin" (Trail Records, 1974)
- "I'm Going There" (Hymnstone Records, 1974)
- "Lord Help Me Bury The Hatchet" (QCA Records, 1975)
- "Higher" (QCA Records, 1976)
- "A Unique Experience" (QCA Records, 1977)
- "Highly Seasoned" (Supreme Records, 1977)
- "Collector's Edition" (HopperSing Records, 1977)
- "Something Going On" (Supreme Records, 1978)
- "Garment of Praise" (Trail Records, 1979)
- "Home Grown" (Supreme Records, 1979)
- "Live" (Supreme Records, 1980)
- "God Will Provide" (Trail Records, 1980)
- "Home Is Where The Heart Is" (Supreme Records, 1981)

The Hoppers

- "Blessings" (HopperSing Records, 1982)
- "Come To The Wedding" (Lifeline Records, 1982)
- "Think On The Good Things" (Lifeline Records, 1983)
- "Traveling Right" (HopperSing Records, 1984)
- "I Know What Lies Ahead" (Lifeline Records, 1984)
- "Citizen of Two Worlds" (HopperSing Records, 1985)
- "Smoke of the Battle" (HopperSing Records, 1986)
- "Whosoever Will" (HopperSing Records, 1987)
- "Stand For Jesus" (Sonlite Records, 1987)
- "He's Still God Live" (Sonlite Records, 1988)
- "On These Grounds" (Sonlite Records, 1990)
- "Heavenly Sunrise" (Sonlite Records, 1991)
- "Mention My Name" (Sonlite Records, 1993)
- "One More Time" (Sonlite Records, 1993)
- "Never Thirst Again" (Sonlite, 1994)
- "A Christmas Story Live" (Sonlite Records, 1994)
- "Anchor to the Power of the Cross" (Homeland, 1995)
- "Timepieces Vol. 1" (Sonlite, 1997)
- "40 Years Forever To Be Remembered" (HopperSing Records, 1997)
- "Forever Settled" (Homeland, 1997)
- "Timepieces Vol. 2" (Sonlite, 1998)
- "One Foundation" (Homeland, 1998)
- "Joy for the Journey" (Homeland, 1999)
- "Shoutin' Time: The Best of the Hoppers" (Homeland, 2000)
- "Classics:Live in Greenville" (Homeland, 2000)
- "Power" (Spring Hill, 2000)
- "Great Joy" (FarmHouse Productions, 2001)
- "Steppin' Out" (Spring Hill, 2002)
- "Great Day (Spring Hill, 2003)
- "Generations" (Spring Hill, 2005)
- "Classic Hits" (Sonlite, 2005)
- "The Ride" (Hoppers Music/Canaan Records, 2006/2007)
- "North America Live" (Canaan, 2009)
- "Unforgettable" (Hoppers Music/Mansion Entertainment, 2009)
- "The Best of the Hoppers: from the Gaither Homecoming Series" (Gaither Music Group, 2010)
- "Something's Happening" (Hoppers Music/Spring Hill, 2010)
- "Hymns: A Classic Collection" (Hoppers Music, 2011)
- "Count Me In" (Hoppers Music, 2012)
- "Generations/Joy for the Journey: Hymns for the Millennium" (Hoppers Music, 2013) [Re-release of former projects on double CD]
- "Kids" (Hoppers Music, 2014)
- "Life is Good" (Daywind, 2016)
- "Honor the First Families of Gospel music" (Hoppers Music, Gaither Music Group, 2018)
- "Anchored - A Collection of New Favorites" (Hoppers Music, 2018)
- "Grace" (Hoppers Music, 2019)
- "Hope" (Daywind, 2021)
- "Believe" (Gaither Music Group, 2022)
- "Road to Grace" (Gaither Music Group, 2026)

Kim Hopper Solo

- "Imagine" (Spring Hill, 2003)
- "I Just Wanted You To Know" (Canaan, 2008)
- "Softly & Tenderly" (KGH, 2021)
