= Ivan Parker =

American Southern Gospel singer (born 1957)

- Born: Ivan Ray Parker; December 21, 1957 (age 68); Sanford, North Carolina United States
- Genres: Christian, Southern gospel
- Occupation: Singer
- Years active: 1982–present
- Website: www.ivanparker.com

Ivan Ray Parker (born December 21, 1957) is an American Southern Gospel singer.

== Musical career ==
Ivan Parker was raised in Sanford, North Carolina, where his father was a pastor in a Pentecostal church. In 1982, Parker joined the Singing Americans, and in 1983 he became lead vocalist of the Dove Award-winning group the Gold City Quartet. As a member of Gold City, he was named Favorite Lead Vocalist by Singing News from 1988 to 1993, and was named Favorite Male Vocalist from 1989 to 1995 and 1997. He was inducted into the Alabama Music Hall of Fame in 1993.

In January 1994, Parker began recording as a solo artist, and in 1995 he joined Bill and Gloria Gaither on the "Homecoming" tour. He continued touring with the Gaithers for 16 years. Occasionally, he would sing with tenor Kirk Talley, and pianist/baritone Anthony Burger in a group they called simply The Trio. From 2001 to 2004 and 2006 to 2016, The Singing News named him Favorite Soloist. In 2007 and 2008, he was voted Male Vocalist of the Year in the Singing News Fan Awards.

Parker's 2008 compilation The Best of Ivan Parker: From the Homecoming Series reached #188 on the Billboard 200. Parker described his 2019 release, Feels Like Home, as having "more of a vintage sound".

== Personal life ==
Parker is married to Theresa, and they have two sons: Josh and Ryan. Josh sometimes performs with his father on tour.

In the summer of 2021, Parker was diagnosed with metastatic squamous cell carcinoma.

== The Trio members ==
=== Line-ups ===
1998–2006

(Under the Name "The Trio")

- Kirk Talley – tenor
- Ivan Parker – lead
- Anthony Burger – baritone, piano

== Discography ==
=== With the Singing Americans ===
- 1982: Exciting Sound of the Singing Americans
- 1982: Sensational Singing Americans

=== With Gold City ===
- 1983: I Think I’ll Read It Again
- 1983: Hymns Sung by the Gold City Quartet
- 1983: Higher than the Moon
- 1984: Walking with Jesus
- 1984 Midnight Cry
- 1984: Walk On
- 1985: Sing with the Angels
- 1986: Double Take: Live
- 1986: Your Favorite Hymns
- 1987: Movin’ Up
- 1988: Portrait
- 1988: Voices of Christmas
- 1989: Favorite Hymns Volume 2
- 1989: Goin’ Home
- 1990: Windows of Home
- 1990: Instrumentals Volume 1
- 1990: Indiana Live
- 1991: 10 Year Celebration
- 1991: Answer the Call
- 1992: Kings Gold
- 1992: Pillars of Faith
- 1993: Kings Gold 2
- 1993: Acapella Gold

=== With The Trio ===
(Anthony Burger, Kirk Talley and Ivan Parker)

- The Trio (1998)
- Back By Popular Demand (2001)
- Havin' a Good Time! (2003)

=== Solo albums ===
- 1994: Faithful
- 1995: Mercy
- 1995: Greatest Hits
- 1996: Live! Night Of Praise (Ivan Parker Ministries)
- 1996: Days Gone By
- 1997: Journey To Forever (Zion Music Group)
- 1998: A Collection Of 20 Favorites (Homeland)
- 1999: Believe (Homeland)
- 2000: Vintage Homecoming (Ivan Parker Ministries)
- 2001: Merry Christmas From Ivan (Homeland)
- 2001: Be Blessed (Cathedral)
- 2002: It's True (Horizon)
- 2003: Just Imagine (Horizon)
- 2004: Redeemer (Horizon)
- 2005: Sing
- 2006: Under Grace (Horizon)
- 2007: That Was Then...This Is Now (Horizon)
- 2008: The Best of Ivan Parker (Gaither Music Group)
- 2008: Inseparable (Horizon)
- 2009: Unity (Horizon)
- 2010: Sing the Greatest Hits of Days Gone By (Horizon)
- 2011: Joyride (Horizon)
- 2012: Timeless Treasures (Horizon)
- 2015: Threads Of Mercy (Horizon)
- 2016: Dancing in the Rain
- 2018: Christmas Dreaming
- 2019: Feels Like Home

== Video ==
- 2005: Requested LIVE
- 2007: The Best of Ivan Parker
- 2010: Exclusively LIVE

=== Gaither Homecoming Video Performances ===
- 1994: O Happy Day - "Wait Till You See Me In My New Home
- 1995: Holy Ground - "Saved by the Hands"
- 1995: Ryman Gospel Reunion - "Farther Along", "The Lighthouse"
- 1996: Joy in the Camp - "I Know","Go Ask"
- 1998: All Day Singing at the Dome - "When I Get Carried Away"
- 1998: Kennedy Center Homecoming - "One Day at a Time"
- 1998: Down by the Tabernacle - "Old Camp Meeting Days", "Tell Me The Story Of Jesus", "At The Altar"
- 1998: Rivers Of Joy - "Jesus, My Wonderful Lord"
- 1999: Singin' In My Soul - "Jesus Loves Me"
- 1999: I'll Meet You on the Mountain - "I Am Loved"
- 1999: Sweet, Sweet Spirit - "Glory Road" (The Trio)
- 2000: Memphis Homecoming - "Wait Till You See Me in My New Home", "Where No One Stands Alone"
- 2000: Oh, My Glory! - "Love Is Like A River", "Our Debts Will Be Paid"
- 2000: Christmas in the Country - "Come And See What's Happenin'"
- 2000: What a Time! - "Rise Again"
- 2000: Irish Homecoming - "Close to the Well", "Midnight Cry"
- 2000: Whispering Hope - "He'd Still Been God", "Precious Jesus"
- 2001: London Homecoming - "He's On Time"
- 2001: Journey to the Sky - "My Journey to the Sky"
- 2002: Freedom Band - "The Statue Of Liberty"
- 2002: Let Freedom Ring - "God Bless the USA"
- 2003: Heaven - "Canaanland Is Just in Sight"
- 2003: Red Rocks Homecoming - "Then He Said, 'Sing!'", "When The Rains Come"
- 2003: Rocky Mountain Homecoming - "He Must Have Had A Mountain On His Mind"
- 2005: Hymns - "Does Jesus Care?"
- 2005: Canadian Homecoming - "Goodbye, World, Goodbye", "I Can Only Imagine", "I'm Saved"
- 2005: Live From Toronto - "When I Get Carried Away"
- 2006: Christmas in South Africa - "A King Is Coming To Town"
- 2007: Amazing Grace - "Tell Me The Story Of Jesus/I Love To Tell The Story", "Jesus Paid It All"
- 2007: How Great Thou Art - "Thank You"
- 2007: Love Can Turn The World - "If The Lord Wasn't Walking by My Side"
- 2007: South African Homecoming - "Midnight Cry"
- 2009: Joy in My Heart - "Sunday Meetin' Time"
