= The Old Friends Quartet =

Former Southern Gospel Group

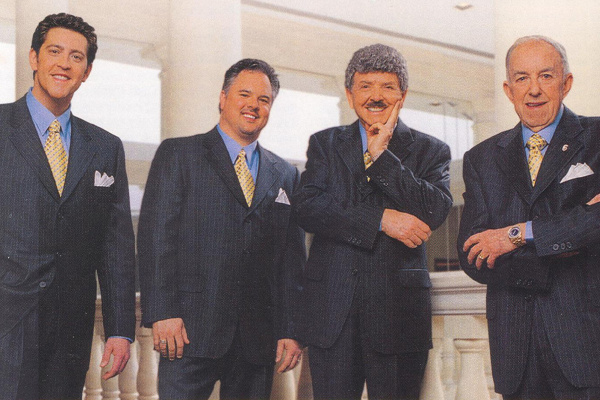
- (l-r) Ernie Haase, Wesley Pritchard, Jake Hess, George Younce

Background information
- Genres: Southern Gospel, Christian, Inspirational
- Years active: 2000–2002
- Label: Spring House
- Past members: Ernie Haase; Wesley Pritchard; Jake Hess; George Younce; Garry Jones

The Old Friends Quartet was a Southern gospel quartet. The group was made up of former Cathedrals members George Younce and Ernie Haase, and former Statesmen/Imperials member Jake Hess, along with Gaither Homecoming artist Wesley Pritchard. The group name came from the Bill Gaither song "Old Friends", reflecting the idea that Hess and Younce had been friends for many years even though they had performed with different groups. They released all their albums with Spring House Productions. In 2002, their DVD Encore, with special guests Aaron Wilburn, The Talleys Trio, and the Gaither Vocal Band, was filmed in Mobile, Alabama and won a Southern Gospel Music Association Award.

The group disbanded after two years due to Younce's and Hess's declining health.

After the group disbanded, Haase and Jones formed The Signature Sound Quartet (which later became Ernie Haase & Signature Sound) in 2002, while Hess and Younce retired from touring. Jones and Haase dissolved their business relationship after the first year, and Pritchard joined them while the group was searching for a full-time lead singer. Jake Hess died on January 4, 2004, aged 76; George Younce died on April 11, 2005, aged 75; and Garry Jones died on April 27, 2025, aged 62.

== Members (past and present) ==
=== Lineups ===
2000-2003
- Ernie Haase – tenor
- Jake Hess – lead
- Wesley Pritchard – baritone
- George Younce – bass
- Garry Jones – piano

== Discography ==
- 2001: Encore
- 2003: Feelin' Fine

Appearances on the Gaither Homecoming videos

- 2000: Christmas In The Country - "Glory To God In The Highest"
- 2001: Encore - all songs (except for 2 songs)
- 2001: A Billy Graham Music Homecoming Vol 1 - "How Long Has It Been"
- 2001: Journey To The Sky - "Glory, Glory Clear The Road"
- 2002: Let Freedom Ring - "Great Day"
