= TaRanda Greene =

American Christian musician (born 1979)

- Also known as: TaRanda Greene Beene
- Born: TaRanda F. Kiser; April 6, 1979 (age 47)
- Origin: St. Petersburg, Florida
- Genres: Worship, Southern gospel, Christian pop
- Occupations: Singer, songwriter
- Instrument: vocals
- Years active: 1997–present
- Label: Stowtown Records
- Website: tarandamusic.com

TaRanda Greene Beene (née, Kiser; born April 6, 1979) is an American Christian musician, who sings Southern gospel, worship and Christian Contemporary music. She has released seven studio albums, Each Day You Face (2003), A Thing Called Love (2006), In The Sanctuary (2008), Stronger (2014), Spirit of Christmas (2015), A Collection (2017), and The Healing (2018).

== Early and personal life ==
Greene was born TaRanda F. Kiser, on April 6, 1979, where she was raised in St. Petersburg, Florida, and graduated from Gibbs High School, in 1997. While, she first enrolled as a student at the University of Florida, she forwent college after a successful audition with The Greenes, a Southern gospel group from Boone, North Carolina.

== Music history ==
Although previously a member of her family group, her music career began with The Greenes in 1997, while her solo career started in 2003, with her first individually released album Everyday You Face. She released Stronger in 2014 with Stowtown Records, followed by "Spirit of Christmas" in 2015. In 2016, she began a musical endeavor with Cana's Voice.

== Personal life ==
Greene married Tony Greene, her fellow band member and boss in February 2001,; the couple would go on to have two daughters together, Isabella (Bella) and Jocelyn (Josie). On September 28, 2010, Tony died due to lung disease following his kidney transplant that took place in August 2009. TaRanda would remarry on March 1, 2016, to Landon Beene in Santa Ynez, California. The couple now resides in East Tennessee together with their four children: Bella and Josie, whom Landon adopted in 2017, Mallory and Ethan.

== Discography ==
Albums

- Each Day You Face (2003)
- A Thing Called Love (2006)
- In the Sanctuary (2008)
- The Best So Far (2012)
- Stronger (2014, Stowtown)
- Spirit of Christmas (2015)
- A Collection (2017)
- The Healing (2018)
