= Kirk Talley =

American singer

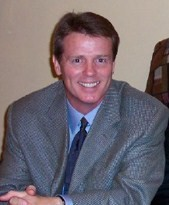
- Kirk Talley in 2007

Background information
- Born: June 9, 1958 (age 67)
- Origin: Tennessee, U.S.
- Genres: Gospel music, Southern gospel
- Occupations: singer, songwriter
- Instruments: Piano, bass guitar
- Years active: 1972–2012
- Labels: Sonlite, AMP Production Group

Kirk Lewis Talley (born June 9, 1958), is an American Southern gospel performer and songwriter. Talley is best known for his time as a tenor singer with the legendary Gospel Quartet the Cathedrals, the Hoppers, and also his own family group the Talleys, along with a very successful solo career as a singer and songwriter.

== Early career ==
Born in Johnson City, Tennessee, Talley was raised in Bulls Gap, Tennessee and graduated from Bulls Gap High School in 1976. He began performing Southern Gospel Music in 1972 with his brother Roger and sister, Diane. He was a member of the groups the Hoppers, the Cathedrals and the Talleys. He joined the Cathedrals in 1979 and with the lineup of Talley, Mark Trammell, Glen Payne, George Younce, and Roger Bennett. During his time with the Cathedrals, Talley wrote a number of songs including "Step Into the Water" that remained at the top of the Southern Gospel chart for nine months. He then left in 1983 to join his brother and sister in law, Roger and Debra, to form the Talleys where he sang tenor until 1992.

While with the Talleys, he wrote "He Is Here" which received the 1991 Dove Award for Southern Gospel Recorded Song of the Year. The album was nominated for the Best Southern Gospel Album at the 34th annual Grammy Awards.

In 1999, Talley formed the Trio with Anthony Burger and Ivan Parker.

== Solo career ==
Talley began his solo career in 1993 and has performed across the United States and Canada. Talley's first No. 1 as a soloist came from his I Speak to You project, with the song "Joy On the Other Side of Jordan".

His project from 1995, Serenade, which would be his first project as a soloist on a major record label, produced two Top 10 charting songs, "Serenaded by Angels" and "If He Hung the Moon", but also a string of awards for Talley at the 1996 National Quartet Convention. Gospel Voice magazine presented Talley with three Diamond Awards: Soloist of the Year, Songwriter of the Year, and Song of the Year for "Serenaded by Angels". The Singing News magazine presented him with the 1996 Fan awards for: Favorite Male Vocalist, Favorite Songwriter, and Song of the Year again for "Serenaded by Angels".

In 1999, Talley released his first Christmas album Talley Ho, Ho, Ho! It has "Fruitcake" by Hee Haw Singers and "I Pray on Christmas" by Kingdom Heirs

Talley did not release a project in 2004. In 2005 he released a semi-popular live album Live at the River. My Story, My Song which was his first album to be released on an independent music label since 1993, the rest of his projects in future years would be released on an independent label.

In 2009, after a five-year standstill from releasing projects due to bad press from an extortion attempt that Talley was a victim of in 2003, Talley released his album entitled "Beyond Words." This would be his newest release since 2005. Talley's comments on this release was "I am so excited about this release. I finally was able to find songs that encompasses a little bit of every style that I like. Beyond Words has to be my favorite CD released to this date. I think it's the most upbeat project that I have done in a long time. If you aren't moved by "When His Presence Fills This Place", you need a check up! It's the most awesome ballad I have sung in years. I just wish I had written it!"

Talley's most recent release as a soloist is his 2011 album Hymns of Hope.

In December 2012, Talley retired from singing after losing his singing voice from an ongoing complication with abductor spasmodic dysphonia. This led to his absence from the 2013 and 2014 Cathedrals Family Reunion.

August 6, 2017 Talley started a food blog on Facebook and Instagram that sometimes includes his niece Lauren Talley where he profiles various restaurants in and around Knoxville, Tennessee.

== Extortion attempt ==
Talley was the subject of an extortion attempt in 2003. Talley randomly met Walbert Farmer, a convicted felon, over an internet chatroom. Farmer attempted to blackmail Talley with allegations that Talley was gay and threatened to inform the public, Talley's record company, and other influential Gospel music artists and institutions if Talley did not pay him. Talley refused to do so, and contacted the FBI and they collaborated to arrest Farmer. When Farmer agreed to meet with Talley, Farmer, 39, was arrested and sentenced to a prison term and a fine. After serving 20 months in prison, Farmer was released on probation which terms he violated several times leading to him serving more prison time.

== Personal life ==
In 2010, Talley was diagnosed with abductor spasmodic dysphonia, a vocal disorder that was affecting his ability to sing. By December 2012, it became so severe after a series of Botox shots that were supposed to give strength back to his voice which wound up making his voice worse, he left the road from singing. Talley issued this to the public toward the end of 2013 in a Facebook post which he said "ok i know i haven't posted much on here lately....but as you know I am no longer traveling or singing. I work full time for Belk, at Westtown Mall in Knoxville. I am a Ralph Lauren Polo specialist there and enjoy that. Vocally I am having trouble. I was diagnosed with Abductor Spasmodic Dysphonia and that has caused it to be very difficult to sing, and some days, even talk. Thanks for your prayers concerning that..." Talley undergoes regular treatment for his vocal problems in the hopes that he may be able to sing again.

In late 2019, Talley appeared in two Facebook videos singing again for the first time since 2012. He has not made it clear whether or not he will pursue singing as a career again.

== The Trio members ==
1998–2006

- Kirk Talley – tenor
- Ivan Parker – lead
- Anthony Burger – baritone, piano
