= This Changes Everything (album) =

Studio album by Cana's Voice
- Released: May 27, 2016
- Genre: Worship; Southern gospel; Christian pop; Christian country; Christian R&B
- Length: 53:46
- Label: StowTown

This Changes Everything is the first studio album by Cana's Voice. StowTown Records released the album on May 27, 2016.

== Critical reception ==
Professional ratings
Review scores
Source	Rating
The Christian Beat	4/5 stars
New Release Today	3.5/5 stars
Today's Christian Entertainment	3.5/5 stars

Awarding the album three and a half stars at New Release Today, Phronsie Howell describes, "This Changes Everything is a strong combination of vocals from powerhouse singers, creating inspirational music that is good for the soul." Kelly Meade, rating the album three and a half stars for Today's Christian Entertainment, writes, "With the release of This Changes Everything, their harmonies blend together with Southern and traditional Gospel music creating a sound that’s all their own." Giving the album four stars by The Christian Beat, Madeleine Dittmer states, "This Changes Everything truly gives glory to God in each song."

== Track listing ==
No.	Title	Length
1.	"Heavenly Father"	3:12
2.	"I Give It to You"	3:59
3.	"Jesus Never Fails"	4:31
4.	"On Mountains Alone"	3:16
5.	"All My Reasons Are You"	4:06
6.	"Love Anyway"	3:20
7.	"His Heart Is Big Enough"	4:27
8.	"There Is a Mountain"	3:07
9.	"The Same Hands"	3:58
10.	"Let the Blood Speak for Me"	3:32
11.	"Hello Fear"	5:29
12.	"I Won't Go Back"	5:20
13.	"Holy Spirit Come and Fill This Place"	5:29
Total length:		53:46

== Charts ==
Chart (2016)	Peak position
US Christian Albums (Billboard)	11
US Heatseekers Albums (Billboard)	9
