= Ernie Haase =

American singer

Raymond Ernest Ernie Haase
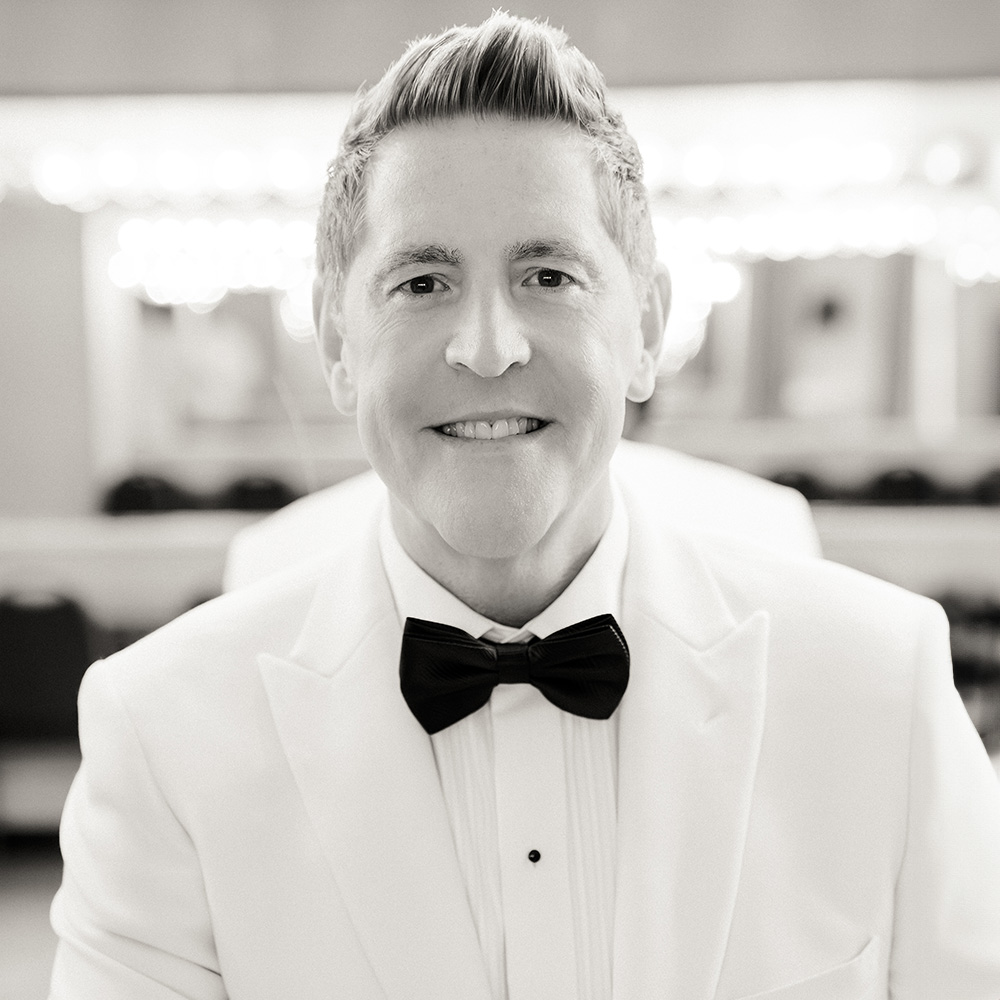

Background information
- Born: December 12, 1964 (age 61); Evansville, Indiana
- Origin: Newburgh, Indiana
- Genres: Christian music, Southern Gospel
- Occupations: Singer, Songwriter, Producer
- Years active: 1986–present
- Website: erniehaase.com

Raymond Ernest "Ernie" Haase III (born December 12, 1964) is an American Southern gospel singer. He is best known as the tenor vocalist and founder of Ernie Haase and Signature Sound since 2002, as well as being a former tenor vocalist of the Cathedrals Quartet from 1990 until their retirement in 1999. He along with Wayne Haun co-founded Stowtown Records in 2011.

== Career ==
The Cathedrals' bass vocalist, George Younce witnessed Haase's performance many times, especially during his time with the Dixie Melody Boys, and marked his fast growth as a vocalist and communicator. In April 1990, Younce and co-founder Glen Payne invited him to join the Cathedrals as their tenor.

After the Cathedral Quartet retired in 1999, Haase embarked upon a solo career for a few years. In addition to his solo concerts, he performed from 2001 through 2003 with Jake Hess, Wesley Pritchard, and George Younce in the Old Friends Quartet.

After the Old Friends Quartet disbanded due to the ill health of Younce and Hess, Haase founded the Signature Sound Quartet, Inc. The group was rebranded by their record label, Gaither Music, to "Ernie Haase and Signature Sound", to take advantage of the platform of the Cathedral Quartet and Haase's popularity as their final tenor. The group received their third "Best Roots Gospel Album" Grammy nomination for Something Beautiful, an homage to the Bill and Gloria Gaither song of the same name. In May 2023 the group celebrated their 20th anniversary by recording a live album in Amsterdam, Netherlands.

== Personal life ==
Haase married George Younce's third daughter, Lisa Younce, in 1990 after a brief courtship.

== Discography ==
- 1995: Journey On
- 1998: What a Difference a Day Makes
- 2000: Never Alone
- 2001: Songs of the Savior
- 2002: Celebration Time
