= Singing Americans =

The Singing Americans
- Origin: Winston-Salem, North Carolina
- Genres: Southern Gospel, Contemporary Christian
- Years active: 1968–1994

The Singing Americans were a Southern Gospel group based Asheville, NC, until 1980, then in Maiden, North Carolina. They brought about popular singers, such as Wayne Maynard (Kingsmen)Mark Flaker (Florida Boys) Ivan Parker (Gold City), Danny Funderburk (the Cathedrals), Clayton Inman (Kingdom Heirs, Won By One, and Triumphant Quartet), David Sutton (Kingdom Heirs and Triumphant Quartet), Michael English (Gaither Vocal Band), Mark Fain (Gold City and Ricky Skaggs & Kentucky Thunder), Taylor Barnes (Gold City), and Jeff Easter (Jeff and Sheri Easter). The group was popular throughout the late 70’s to early 1990s.

== History ==
The Singing Americans were started in 1968 in Winston-Salem, North Carolina by Lemar and Sims.The group was then owned by Homer Wadford and based out of Raleigh, NC. In 1973 when the Oak Ridge Boys were beginning to make their transition from gospel to country, The Singing Americans were signed by the Lou Wills Hildreth Agency in Nashville. In an article announcing the signing, The Singing News predicted that based on their sound and popularity, that The Singing Americans would take the Oak Ridge Boys spot as the number one quartet in gospel music.

The group was owned by Homer Wadford who moved the group to Asheville, NC in 1977. Wadford started a flooring business with Eldredge Fox of the Kingsmen Quartet. The Singing Americans were Rodney Hoots singing tenor, Gary Herron, then Ed Crawford singing lead, Wayne Maynard singing baritone and Hovie Walker singing bass. This was the original Singing Americans that began to travel the country as a full time gospel group.

In 1980, the group was taken over by Charles Burke. Personnel was Ed Crawford singing Lead, and Charles Burke's son, Dwayne, singing bass. Danny Funderburk sang Tenor,Ed Crwaford left and was replaced by Michael English, who would leave for a couple years and be replaced by Ivan Parker, and then Clayton Inman. Also, in 1982, Surrat would leave and be replaced by Southern Gospel legend, Ed Hill. When Michael English left for the second time in 1985, he was replaced again by Clayton Inman, who would replace Hill in 1987 in the baritone spot, leaving the lead open for Scott Whitener. The 1990s started a decline in the popularity of the Singing Americans, but it did not mean they still weren't capable of producing popular singers. David Sutton and Taylor Barnes passed through the group during this time. Finally, in 1993, the Singing Americans produced their final album, "Live from Chicago", before retiring in 1994.

In 1995, Good Ol' Gospel, an album featuring Singing Americans as well as the Cathedral Quartet, the Kingsmen, the Speer Family, J.D. Sumner & the Stamps Quartet, and Crystal Sea, was nominated for the 26th Dove Awards in the Southern Gospel Album category.

In August 1996, promoter/historian Charles Waller reunited English with Ed Hill, Rick Strickland, Dwayne Burke and Milton Smith as the Singing Americans, before an audience of over 4,000 gospel music fans at the Grand Ole Gospel Reunion, and in 2010 at the National Quartet Convention in Louisville, KY at a showcase commemorating the 100th anniversary of Southern Gospel music.

== Members ==
=== Lineups ===
1968–1971 (Under the Name "Singing Americans")	1971-1972	1972-1973
Bob Sims – tenor; Preston Yates – lead; Bob Lemar – baritone, piano; Norris Rife - bass	Bob Sims – tenor; Preston Yates – lead; Bob Lemar – baritone, piano; Rick Lott - bass	Rodney Hoots – tenor; Bob Lemar – lead, piano; Mickey Blackwelder – baritone; Danny Gallimore - bass; Joel Harris - piano
1973-1974	1974-1979	1979-1980
Rodney Hoots – tenor; Bob Lemar – lead, piano; Glenn Dye – lead; Mickey Blackwelder – baritone; Hovie Walker - bass; Jimmy Taylor - piano	Rodney Hoots – tenor; Wayne Maynard – baritone; Jerry Brown - bass	Rodney Hoots – tenor; Ed Crawford – lead; Jerry Brown - bass
mid 1980	1980-1981	1981-1982
Mark Flaker – tenor; Ed Crawford – lead; Charles Surratt – baritone; Dwayne Burke - bass	Danny Funderburk – tenor; Ed Crawford – lead; Charles Surratt – baritone; Dwayne Burke - bass	Danny Funderburk – tenor; Mike English – lead; Ed Hill – baritone; Dwayne Burke - bass; Jerry Hatley - piano
1982-1983	mid 1983	1983-1984
Danny Funderburk – tenor; Ivan Parker – lead; Ed Hill – baritone; Dwayne Burke - bass; Jerry Hatley - piano	Danny Funderburk – tenor; Clayton Inman – lead; Ed Hill – baritone; Dwayne Burke - bass; Jerry Hatley - piano; Martin Gureasko - piano	Danny Funderburk – tenor; Mike English – lead; Ed Hill – baritone; Dwayne Burke - bass; Martin Gureasko - piano
1984-1985	1985-1986	1986-1987
Rick Strickland – tenor; Mike English – lead; Ed Hill – baritone; Dwayne Burke - bass; Martin Guraesko - piano	Rick Strickland – tenor; Clayton Inman – lead; Ed Hill – baritone; Dwayne Burke - bass; Milton Smith - piano	Phil Barker – tenor; Clayton Inman – lead; Ed Hill – baritone; Dwayne Burke - bass; Phil Huffman - piano
1987-1988	1988-1989	1989-1990
Phil Barker – tenor; Scott Whitener – lead; Clayton Inman – baritone; Dwayne Burke - bass; James Rainey - piano	Greg Shockley – tenor; Scott Whitener – lead; Clayton Inman – baritone; Dwayne Burke - bass; James Rainey - piano	Greg Shockley – tenor; Scott Whitener – lead; David Jenkins – baritone; Dwayne Burke - bass; James Rainey - piano
1990-1992	mid 1992	1992-1993
David Walker – tenor; Scott Whitener – lead; David Harvell – baritone; Larry Stewart - bass; Keith Denson - piano	David Sutton – tenor; Scott Whitener – lead; Buddy Burton – baritone; Larry Stewart - bass; Jerry Kelso - piano	David Sutton – tenor; Scott Whitener – lead; Buddy Burton – baritone; Larry Stewart - bass; Joe Lane - piano
mid 1993	1993-1994	1994
David Sutton – tenor; Scott Whitener – lead; Buddy Burton – baritone; Larry Stewart - bass; Randy Matthews - piano	David Sutton – tenor; Scott Whitener – lead; Buddy Burton – baritone; Larry Stewart - bass; Joe Lane - piano	Greg Bentley – tenor; Loren Harris – lead; Buddy Burton – baritone; Larry Stewart - bass; Chuck Trivett - piano

Tenor

- Bob Sims (1968-1971)
- Rodney Hoots (1972-1979)
- Mark Flaker (1980)
- Danny Funderburk (1980-1983)
- Rick Strickland (1984-1986)
- Phil Barker (1986-1988)
- Greg Shockley (1988-1990)
- David Walker (1990-1992)
- David Sutton (1992-1994)
- Greg Bentley (1994)

Lead

- Preston Yates (1968-1971)
- Bob Lemar (1972-1974) (moved from baritone; also played piano and managed)
- Glenn Dye (1973-1974)
- Ed Crawford (1979-1981)
- Michael English (1981-1982, 1983-1985)
- Ivan Parker (1982-1983)
- Clayton Inman (1983, 1985-1987) (moved to baritone)
- Scott Whitener (1987-1992)
- Dale Forbes (1992-1994)
- David Hill (1994)
- Loren Harris (1994)

Baritone

- Bob Lemar (1968-1971) (moved to lead; also played piano and managed)
- Mickey Blackwelder (1972-1974)
- Wayne Maynard (1974-1979)
- Charles Surratt (1980-1981)
- Ed Hill (1981-1987) (Surratt and Mike Lefevre filled in for Hill several months after he was injured in a bus wreck.)
- Clayton Inman (1987-1989) (moved from lead)
- David Jenkins (1989-1990)
- David Harvell (1990-1992)
- Buddy Burton (1992-1994)

Bass

- Norris Rife (1968-1971)
- Rick Lott (1971-1972)
- Danny Gallimore (1972-1973)
- Hovie Walker (1973-1979)
- Jerry Brown (1979-1980)
- Dwayne Burke (1980-1990)
- Larry Stewart (1990–94)

Piano

- Bob Lemar (1968-1972) (piano, also sang lead)
- Joel Harris (1972-1973)
- Jimmy Taylor (1973-1974)
- Jerry Hatley (1981-1983)
- Martin Gureasko (1983-1985)
- Milton Smith (1985-1986)
- Phil Huffman (1986-1987)
- James Rainey (1987-1990)
- Keith Denson (1990-1992)
- Jerry Kelso (1992)
- Joe Lane (1992-1993, 1993–94)
- Randy Matthews (1993)
- Chuck Trivett (1994)

Bass Guitar

- Euclid Huella (1968-1971)
- Tony Buttler (1971)
- Jeff Easter (198?-1987)
- Mark Fain (1987-1988)
- Taylor Barnes (1988-1993)
- Jason Clark (1993–94)

Rhythm and Lead Guitar

- Harvey Blackwelder

Drums

- Jon Mark Russell (19??-197?)

Trumpet

- Jerry Hill (1972-????)
- Gary Barnhart (1972-????)

Musicians Unknown Positions

- Benny Goins
- Jason Clark
- Roger Fortner
- Rory Rigdon

== Discography ==
- 1973-Our Tribute To God And Country
- 1975-Wanted Live
- 1977-The Singing Americans
- 1980-Tell the Angels
- 1981-The Exciting Sounds of the Singing Americans
- 1981-Hymntime
- 1981-Gospel Favorites Vol. 2
- 1982-Sensational Singing Americans
- 1982-Sing Gospel Hits Volume 1
- 1982-Sing Gospel Hits Volume 2
- 1982-Sing Gospel Hits Volume 3
- 1982-Sing Gospel Hits Volume 4
- 1983-Everybody Ought to Praise His Name
- 1984-Gospel Favorites
- 1984-Something Old, Something New
- 1984-Live and Alive
- 1985-Black and White
- 1986-Hearts of Praise, Songs of Majesty
- 1987-Homecoming Live
- 1988-Chartbreakers
- 1988-Sing Out
- 1988-We're Blessed
- 1989-Angels on Board
- 1989-Songs We Salute
- 1990-Watch & Pray
- 1990-Greatest Hits: 10th Anniversary Collection (Compilation)
- 1991-Live & Well
- 1991-Revival
- 1992-On Stage
- 1993-Live from Chicago
- 1993-Golden Hits
- 1993-Song of Praise
- 1994-Sing the Old Songs
- 1996-20 Favorites By The Singing Americans (Compilation)
- 199?-The Devil Don't Want Us to Have a Revival
- 199?-Singing Americans Featuring Buddy Burton
- 199?-Singing For America (Compilation)

Top 20 Songs:

- Something New
- Home
- Over There
- People Need The Lord
- Lamb Of Glory
- Black And White
- Welcome To Heaven
- God Is Greater
- They Can't Take That Away
- I'd Still Want To Go
- I Want To Make Heaven My Home
- More Than Enough
- Love M.I.A.
- Leaning On The Rock
- Bridegroom Cometh
- Put Your Dreams Where Your Heart Is
- Jesus Got A Hold Of Me
- Past to Presence
- After A While
- God Be With You Till We Meet Again
