= Brian Free & Assurance =

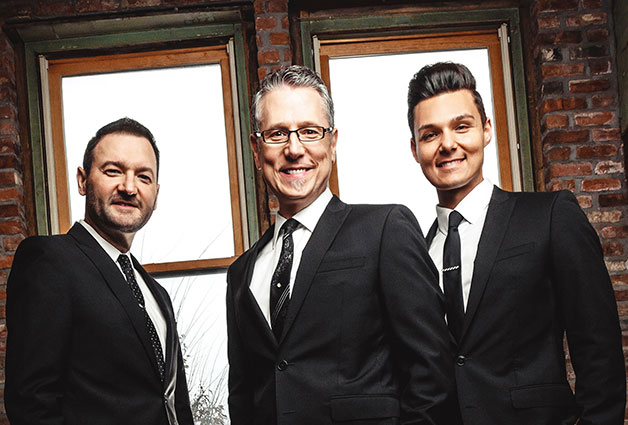
- Photo Shoot from Latest Album

Background information
- Genres: Southern gospel
- Years active: 1993 – present
- Label: Daywind
- Website: Official Website

Brian Free & Assurance is a Southern gospel group. Brian Free formed the group in 1993 after performing with the Gold City Quartet from 1982-1993. Since being formed, the group has released multiple albums.

== Personnel history ==
Tenor

- Brian Free (1993–1998, 2001–present)(previously of Gold City)

Lead

- Kevin Price (1993-1995)
- Kevin McCaw (1995-1997)(also sang with Anchormen and Cumberland Quartet)
- Randy Crawford (1997-1998)(went on to The Kingsmen Quartet)
- Bill Shivers (2001-present)

Baritone

- Mike LeFevre (1993-1997)(sang with Gold City and formed The LeFevre Quartet)
- John McBroom (1997-1998)
- Craig Singletary (2001-2003)
- Derrick Selph (2003-2009; 2010-2013)(previously of Dixie Melody Boys)
- Randy Crawford (2009-2010)
- Mike Rogers (2013-2021)(previously of Dixie Melody Boys)
- Jake Anglin (2021-2025)
- Dayton Gay (2026-present)(previously of The Perrys)

Bass

- Bob Caldwell (1996-1998)(previously of Kingdom Heirs and Statesmen Quartet)
- Bill Lawrence (2001-2003)(went on to Gold City)
- Keith Plott (2003-2007)(went on to The LeFevre Quartet)
- Jeremy Lile (2008-2015)

Piano

- Michael Camp (2001-2002)
- Josh Simpson (2002-2003)(went on to Gold City and The Hoppers)
- Scott McDowell (2003-2008)

Drums

- Ricky Free (2001-2007)

== Discography ==
- Brian Free & Assurance (1994)
- Things That Last Forever (1995)
- Live In Atlanta (1995)
- At Your Request (1996)
- 4 God So Loved (1996)
- A Glimpse Of Gold (1997)
- Doing This For You (1999)
- Lovin' This Livin' For The Lord (2001)
- So Close To Home (2002)
- Timeless Hymns & Classics (2002)
- Greater Still (2003)
- Live In New York City (2005)
- Christmas With Brian Free And Assurance (2005)
- It's So God! (2006)
- Real Faith (2007)
- Timeless Hymns & Classics Volume II (2008)
- Worth It (2009)
- Acappella (2010)
- Never Walk Alone (2010)
- Nothing But Love (2012)
- Unashamed (2014)
- Live Like We're Redeemed (2016)
- Live At Daywind Studios (2016)
- Beyond Amazed (2017)
- How Good Does Grace Feel (2019)
- Looks Like Jesus (2021)
- Meet Me At The Cross (2022)
- Grateful for the Gospel (2024)

=== Brian Free Solo Albums ===
- Brian Free (1999)
- Call of the Cross (2001)
- Signature Ballads (2017)

=== Compilation Albums ===
- 7 Hits (2009)
- A Season To Remember: Their Greatest Hits (2011)
- 30th Anniversary: A Collection of Greatest Hits (2023)

== Awards ==
Year	Award	Result
2006	Southern Gospel Recorded Song Of The Year (Long As I Got King Jesus)	Won
2007	Southern Gospel Album of the Year (It's So God)	Nominated
2008	Southern Gospel Album of the Year (Real Faith)	Nominated
2009	Southern Gospel Recorded Song of the Year ("I Believe God")	Nominated
2010	Southern Gospel Album of the Year (Worth It)	Nominated
2011	Inspirational Album of the Year (Accapella)	Nominated
2011	Southern Gospel Album of the Year (Never Walk Alone)	Nominated
2013	Music Video of the Year (I Want To Be That Man)	Won
2013	Tenor of the Year (Brian Free)	Nominated
2014	GMA Dove Awards Southern Gospel Performance Of The Year (Say Amen)	Won
