= Steve French =

Steve French may refer to:

- Steve French (politician) (born 1962), member of the Alabama Senate
- Steve French (singer) (1959–2016), American baritone with the Kingdom Heirs
- Steve French (cougar), a cougar in a 2004 episode of the Canadian comedy mockumentary Trailer Park Boys
- Steve French, host of The Morning Buzz on WNIR
- Steven French (actor), American voice actor
- Steven French (philosopher) (born 1956), Philosopher
