= Legacy Five =

Southern Gospel Quartet

- Genres: Southern gospel, Christian, CCM
- Years active: 1999–present
- Labels: Homeland Records, Cathedral Records, Daywind Records, StowTown Records
- Members: Scott Fowler; Jake Losen; Jon Epley; Caleb Ozee; Philip Kolb
- Past members: Roger Bennett; Glenn Dustin; Scott Howard; Josh Cobb; Tony Jarman; Frank Seamans; Gus Gaches; Trey Ivey; Josh Feemster; Josh Townsend; Garrett Anderson; Bryan Walker; Matt Fouch; Lee Black; Tim Parton
- Website: www.legacyfive.com

Legacy Five is a Southern gospel quartet founded by former Cathedral Quartet members Roger Bennett and Scott Fowler, after the owners of the Cathedral Quartet, Glen Payne and George Younce, decided to retire in 1999.

== History ==
Legacy Five's first lineup consisted of tenor Josh Cobb, lead Scott Fowler, baritone Scott Howard, bass Glenn Dustin, and pianist Roger Bennett, who supplied a fifth vocal part in some songs.

The group enjoyed great success with their first album release, Strong In The Strength. The group's first Top 10 hit, "I Stand Redeemed", featured young tenor Josh Cobb. He won the Horizon Individual Award at the 2000 National Quartet Convention, and resigned from the group two days later, saying he felt he wasn't really part of the group. Cobb was replaced by Tony Jarman, who stayed with the group until 2004.

Frank Seamans, who sang with Scott Fowler in the 1990s in a group called The Sound, replaced Tony and stayed with the group from 2004 to 2009. In 2005, he won the Horizon Individual Award.

Tim Parton, a pianist who produced a number of the group's albums, joined the group on the road in October 2006 as a substitute for the ill Bennett. Following Bennett's death on March 17, 2007, from complications related to leukemia, Parton's "interim" tag was removed, as the group officially named him the regular pianist.

In September 2009, Frank Seamans announced his departure from Legacy Five due to his son's health issues. In October, his replacement, Gus Gaches, who previously sang with The LeFevre Quartet, was announced.

In 2011, pianist Tim Parton left, and was replaced by Trey Ivey.

On July 12, 2012, bass singer Glenn Dustin resigned, and was replaced by Matt Fouch from Soul'd Out Quartet.

In November 2015, Gus Gaches announced his departure due to several allergies and vocal fatigue. On October 8, Josh Feemster, formerly of Mercy's Mark, was named the new tenor for Legacy Five and started singing in December 2015.

On April 21, 2017, pianist Trey Ivey announced his departure from Legacy Five to spend more time with his family and focus on his studio. On June 17, 2017, Josh Townsend, from the Lefevre Quartet, announced on his personal Facebook profile he had been chosen to be Ivey's replacement.

On March 11, 2019, tenor Josh Feemster announced his resignation to work from home. Two weeks later, on March 25, baritone Scott Howard also announced his resignation to work at Danley Sound Labs, assisting clients with audio needs. On April 22, 2019, it was announced that Bryan Walker, former member of the Perrys, would be taking over the baritone position. Also, songwriter Lee Black would join the group as the tenor singer.

On May 24, 2021, Josh Townsend announced he would leave his position as the group's piano player to focus on producing his own music. His replacement, Garrett Anderson, was announced on Legacy Five's Facebook page on August 2. On March 4, 2023, Anderson announced his departure from the group after accepting a position with Dailey & Vincent. A week later, Bryan Walker, too, announced his departure from the group. On June 5, 2023, Legacy Five announced the return of Tim Parton as pianist and the addition of Jake Losen as the new baritone singer.

On June 16, 2025, bass singer Matt Fouch announced his resignation from the group. Ten days later, Jon Epley, formerly a baritone for Greater Vision, was announced as Fouch's replacement.

In January 2026, Scott Fowler announced on Facebook the departure of Lee Black, in October 2025, and Tim Parton, in December of the same year. In February, Caleb Ozee was announced as the group's new tenor and Philip Kolb as the new pianist.

== Performances ==
They have performed with the Gaither Homecoming Friends as well as being a regular feature at the National Quartet Convention.

They have been nominated for over 70 Singing News Fan Awards, including Best Traditional Male Quartet in 2004, and have won or been nominated for an award nearly every year. At the 2004 Fan Awards, the group won in the categories of Traditional Quartet, Baritone, Bass and Pianist. At the 2005 Fan Awards, Frank Seamans won the Horizon Individual Award. At the 2007 Fan Awards, Roger Bennett was posthumously awarded Favorite Musician Award. He had won it 15 times in a row, and is the holder of the record for most consecutive such awards to date. Glenn Dustin also won Favorite Bass, and the group's Live In Music City album won Album of the Year. At the 2008 Fan Awards, the group won the Best Traditional Male Quartet Award one more time. At the 2010 Fan Awards, the Jubilee! project, by Legacy Five, Greater Vision and The Booth Brothers, won the Album of the Year Award. The group has also been nominated for a few GMA Dove Awards, and their Pure Love project was awarded Southern Gospel Album of the Year on the 2020 Dove Awards.

One of their best-known songs, "Heroes of the Faith", was composed by Roger Bennett in honor of Glen Payne. "Hello After Goodbye", from their God's Been Good project, was recorded in honor of Roger Bennett.

== Members ==
=== Lineups ===
1999–2000	2000–2004	2004–2007
Josh Cobb – tenor; Scott Fowler – lead, bass guitar; Scott Howard – baritone; Glenn Dustin – bass; Roger Bennett – piano, vocals	Tony Jarman – tenor; Scott Fowler – lead, bass guitar; Scott Howard – baritone; Glenn Dustin – bass; Roger Bennett – piano, vocals	Frank Seamans – tenor; Scott Fowler – lead; Scott Howard – baritone; Glenn Dustin – bass; Roger Bennett – piano, vocals; Jordan Bennett – bass guitar
2007–2009	2009–2011	2011–2012
Frank Seamans – tenor; Scott Fowler – lead; Scott Howard – baritone; Glenn Dustin – bass; Tim Parton – piano, vocals	Gus Gaches – tenor; Scott Fowler – lead; Scott Howard – baritone; Glenn Dustin – bass; Tim Parton – piano, vocals	Gus Gaches – tenor; Scott Fowler – lead; Scott Howard – baritone; Glenn Dustin – bass; Trey Ivey – piano, vocals
2012–2015	2015–2017	2017–2019
Gus Gaches – tenor; Scott Fowler – lead; Scott Howard – baritone; Matt Fouch – bass; Trey Ivey – piano, vocals	Josh Feemster – tenor; Scott Fowler – lead; Scott Howard – baritone; Matt Fouch – bass; Trey Ivey – piano, vocals	Josh Feemster – tenor; Scott Fowler – lead; Scott Howard – baritone; Matt Fouch – bass; Josh Townsend – piano, vocals
2019–2021	2021–2023	2023–2025
Lee Black – tenor; Scott Fowler – lead; Bryan Walker – baritone; Matt Fouch – bass; Josh Townsend – piano, vocals	Lee Black – tenor; Scott Fowler – lead; Bryan Walker – baritone; Matt Fouch – bass; Garrett Anderson – piano	Lee Black – tenor; Scott Fowler – lead; Jake Losen – baritone; Matt Fouch – bass; Tim Parton – piano, vocals
2025	2026-present	Upcoming 2026
Lee Black – tenor; Scott Fowler – lead; Jake Losen – baritone; Jon Epley – bass; Tim Parton – piano, vocals	Caleb Ozee – tenor; Scott Fowler – lead; Jake Losen – baritone; Jon Epley – bass; Philip Kolb – piano, vocals	Caleb Ozee – tenor; Scott Fowler – lead; David Ragan – baritone; Jon Epley – bass; Philip Kolb – piano, vocals

== Discography ==
Heritage Vol. I (2001)

Heroes of the Faith (2001)

Heritage Vol. II (2002)

London (2003)

Heritage Vol. III (2004)

Monuments (2004)

A Little Taste of Heaven (2005)

A Capella (2006)

Know So Salvation (2007)

A Little Christmas (2007)

God's Been Good (2008)

7 Hits (2009)

Live at Oak Tree (2009)

Give the World a Smile (2010)

A Wonderful Life (2011)

Great Day (2014)

In The Hands of a Carpenter (2016)

Live at Daywind Studios (2016)

Faith & Freedom (2017)

Pure Love (2019)

Something New (2021)

25 (2024)

== Charting songs (Top 80 Southern Gospel) ==
#1 charting songs are shown in bold.

Year	Month	Song	Position	Album
2000	September	"I Stand Redeemed"	6	Strong in the Strength
2001	January–February	"Strong in the Strength"	26	Strong in the Strength
2001	October	"We Are Home"	38	Strong in the Strength
2002	March–April	"Heroes of the Faith"	9	Heroes of the Faith
2002	October	"Freedom"	14	Heroes of the Faith
2003	April	"Somebody Sing"	8	Heroes of the Faith
2003	September	"**I Found Grace**"	**1**	London
2004	May	"He Forgets"	18	London
2004	December	"It's Good to Know"	16	London
2005	May	"Monuments"	17	Monuments
2005	October	"Not That You Died"	21	Monuments
2006	June	"Out of my Darkness"	10	Monuments
2006	December	"Roll Away"	45	Monuments
2007	May–June	"Strike Up the Band"	4	Live in Music City
2008	January	"I've Been Changed"	5	Live in Music City
2008	July	"Know So Salvation"	9	Know So Salvation
2009	January	"Hello After Goodbye"	10	God's Been Good
2009	August	"In a Million Years"	8	God's Been Good
2010	May	"When They Found Nothing"	32	Just Stand
2010	October	"My Soul is Firmly Anchored"	9	Just Stand
2011	May	"Just Stand"	23	Just Stand
2011	October	"We Shall See Jesus"	10	Give the World a Smile
2012	April	"Ask Me Why"	11	A Wonderful Life
2012	December	"I'm Still Amazed"	5	A Wonderful Life
2013	May	"There's Only One Well"	12	A Wonderful Life
2014	January	"Living in the Palace"	10	A Wonderful Life
2014	August	"He Is to Me"	9	Great Day
2015	March	"**Christ Is Still The King**"	**1**	Great Day
2015	October	"Who Is This Man"	12	Great Day
2016	April	"That's a Hallelujah"	5	Great Day
2017	May	"Still"	3	In the Hands of a Carpenter
2017	September	"In the Hands of a Carpenter"	26	In the Hands of a Carpenter
2018	May	"I Trust the Cross"	22	In the Hands of a Carpenter
2018	September	"Deep in my Heart"	46	In the Hands of a Carpenter
2020	January	"**What Kind of Man**"	**1**	Pure Love
2020	August	"I Believe the Book"	5	Pure Love
2021	August	"**What a Day**"	**1**	Pure Love
2022	February	"Given, Buried, Risen"	10	Something New
2022	August–September	"Enough for me"	7	Something New
2023	May–June	"Testify"	8	Something New
2023	September–October	"I've Seen What He Can Do"	20	Something New
2024	October	"You Have Always Been My Shepherd"	5	25
2025	June	"Bigger on the Inside"	4	25
2026	January	"**Homeward Bound**"	**1**	25
