= Glen Payne =

American singer (1926–1999)

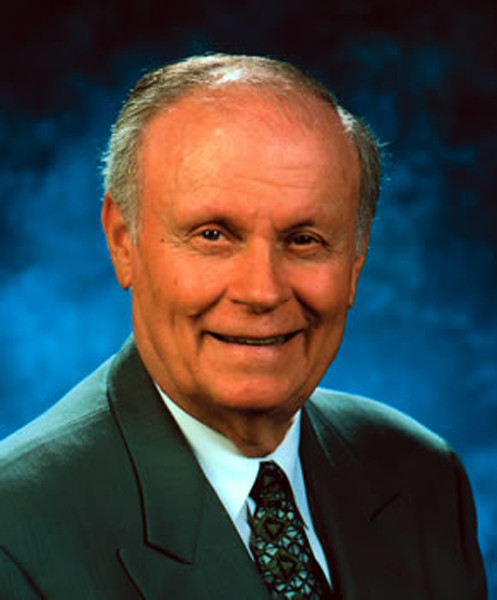

Background information
- Born: Glen Weldon Payne; October 20, 1926; Royse City, Texas
- Died: October 15, 1999 (aged 72) Franklin, Tennessee
- Genre: Southern gospel
- Occupations: Singer, music publisher
- Instrument: Vocals
- Years active: 1939–1999

Glen Weldon Payne (October 20, 1926 – October 15, 1999) was a Southern gospel vocalist who served for 55 years and was known for being the lead vocalist for The Cathedral Quartet.

== Early years ==
Payne was a child of the Great Depression. His parents were cotton farmers in Texas.

At age 17 in 1944, he joined the Stamps-Baxter Quartet. Payne was also a member of the Lester Stamps Quartet, The Stamps All-Stars, and The Stamps-Ozark Quartet. In 1956, he joined The Weatherford Quartet, which featured Glen, Earl and Lily Fern Weatherford, Armond Morales, and George Younce. Younce was later replaced by Henry Slaughter.

== Career ==
In 1963, Weatherfords members Glen, Bobby Clark, and Danny Koker departed to work for evangelist Rex Humbard at the Cathedral of Tomorrow in Akron, Ohio. Together, they formed the Cathedral Trio. With the addition of bass singer George Younce a year later, the Cathedral Trio became the Cathedral Quartet. The Cathedrals immediately became a sensation with their smooth quartet sound. Over the next 35 years, the Cathedrals won numerous Singing News Fan Awards and had several number one hits on the Southern Gospel Charts including Step into The Water, Boundless Love, and He Made a Change. While the quartet saw several different people hold the tenor, baritone and pianist positions, Payne and Younce remained the guiding forces of the quartet until Glen's death in 1999 during the Cathedral's farewell retirement tour. Payne and Younce were the only lead and bass singers the Cathedrals ever had.

During the 1970s, the Cathedrals were regulars on Sunday Morning Television appearing on "The Gospel Singing Jubilee" and also appeared in several Billy Graham Crusades. They also appeared on NBC's "Today" show. During the 1990s, the Cathedrals were regulars on the "Gaither Homecoming" videos and were generally recognized as the top quartet in Southern Gospel music.

Glen was the willing "target" of many of emcee George's jokes and icebreakers during the quartet's run. George often referred to Glen as "The Old Man". Glen's signature song was We Shall See Jesus.

Glen sat as a member of the board of directors of the National Quartet Convention and the Southern Gospel Museum and Hall of Fame for many years, being enshrined in the SGMA Hall of Fame at Dollywood in Pigeon Forge, Tennessee itself in 1998.

== Death ==
Glen died due to complications from cancer on October 15, 1999, aged 72 during the Cathedral's farewell tour, just five days before his 73rd birthday. Although unable to attend that year, Glen made his final performance at the National Quartet Convention via telephone hook-up from his hospital bed at Vanderbilt Hospital. During this Cathedral's appearance at NQC, Glen talked with George and the audience over the phone and, at George's behest, sang the old hymn I Won't Have To Cross Jordan Alone in one of the most memorable NQC performances of all time. It was the final time Glen would perform publicly with the Cathedrals. Payne was married and had three children and three grandchildren. He is buried in Williamson Memorial Gardens in Franklin, Tennessee.

On April 4, 2019, Glen's wife Van Lua died aged 81. On June 27, 2024, Glen's daughter Carla died aged 64 from cancer.

== Bibliography ==
- “Glen Payne, Inducted 1993,” Texas Gospel Music Hall of Fame (http://www.tgmhf.org/hall/hall.php?page=payneg), accessed October 28, 2010.
- James R. Goff, Jr., Close Harmony: A History of Southern Gospel (Chapel Hill: The University of North Carolina Press, 2002).
- Jim Goff and Danny Jones, “Southern Gospel Music Mourns the Loss of Another Pioneer: GLEN PAYNE 1926–1999”.
- Singing News (December, 1999) (http://www.singingnews.com/ Southern-Gospel-News/11609840/), accessed October 25, 2010.
- Michael P. Graves and David Fillingim, eds., More Than “Precious Memories”: The Rhetoric of Southern Gospel Music (Macon, Georgia: Mercer University Press, 2004).
- Glen Payne and George Younce, with Ace Collins, The Cathedrals (Grand Rapids: Zondervan Publishing House, 1998).
