= Sweatman =

Sweatman is a surname.

Notable people with the name include:

- Arthur Sweatman (1834–1909), Canadian priest, archbishop, and the 3rd Primate of the Anglican Church of Canada
- Dustin Sweatman, former lead singer of the Mark Trammell Quartet
- Fraser Sweatman (1913–1991), Canadian figure skater who competed in pairs
- Jo Sweatman (1872–1956), Australian painter
- Margaret Sweatman (born 1953), Canadian writer
- Alan Sweatman (1920–2012), of the Manitoba law firm Thompson Dorfman Sweatman
- Wilbur Sweatman (1882–1961), American ragtime and dixieland jazz composer, bandleader, and clarinetist
- Noel Sweatman (1928), Australian fireman best known for his actions during the Buckingham Department store fire, Anzac Day 1968
