= Mark Trammell Quartet =

Southern gospel quartet

- Also known as: Mark Trammell Trio (2002–2010)
- Genres: Southern gospel, contemporary christian
- Years active: 2002–present
- Labels: Daywind Records (2002-2015), Crimson Road Productions (2014, 2016-present)
- Members: Nick Trammell – Lead; Mark Trammell – Baritone; Stephen Adair – Tenor; Will Lane – Bass; Trevor Conkle – Piano
- Website: marktrammellministries.com

Mark Trammell Quartet, previously Mark Trammell Trio, is a Southern gospel quartet, founded by Mark Trammell, who formerly sang with the Kingsmen Quartet, Gold City Quartet, The Cathedrals, and Greater Vision.

== Group history ==
The group began in 2002 as a trio consisting of Eric Philips, Mark Trammell, and Joseph Smith. Tenor Joel Wood performed with the quartet from 2009 through 2011 until Eric Phillips returned. In 2013, Eric Phillips once again returned to Law Enforcement work, so a search for a new tenor went out, until Dustin Black, a brand new Southern Gospel tenor was discovered. Dustin Sweatman served for 6 years as lead singer and pianist, from 2006 through September 2012. When Dustin Sweatman stepped down as lead singer in 2012, Mark's son Nick Trammell came on board as their new lead singer and is still present with the group. In 2009 Pat Barker joined the group as bass and the quartet was formed. In 2014, Pat Barker felt it was time to leave the road, so Randy Byrd, formerly of the Lefevre Quartet, began singing bass with the group. Blake Buffin joined as the new tenor in the Summer of 2015. Buffin departed the group for The Inspirations in 2019, and Stephen Adair from The Dixie Echoes was selected as the new tenor.

== Members (past and present) ==
=== Lineups ===
2002–2006 (Under the Name "Mark Trammell Trio")	2006–2007	2007–2009
Eric Phillips – tenor; Mark Trammell – lead, baritone, bass guitar, group owner; Joseph Smith – lead, baritone, piano	Eric Phillips – tenor; Mark Trammell – lead, baritone, bass guitar, group owner; Dustin Sweatman – lead, baritone; Steve Hurst – piano (sings one song per album)	Eric Phillips – tenor; Mark Trammell – lead, baritone, bass guitar, group owner; Dustin Sweatman – lead, baritone, piano
2009–2010	2010–2011 (Under the Name "Mark Trammell Quartet")	2011–2012
Joel Wood – tenor; Mark Trammell – lead, baritone, bass guitar, group owner; Dustin Sweatman – lead, baritone, piano	Joel Wood – tenor; Mark Trammell – lead, baritone, bass guitar, group owner; Dustin Sweatman – lead, baritone, piano; Pat Barker – bass	Eric Phillips – tenor; Dustin Sweatman – lead, baritone, piano; Mark Trammell – lead, baritone, bass guitar, group owner; Pat Barker – bass
2012	2012–2013	2013–2014
Eric Phillips – tenor; Nick Trammell – lead, baritone; Mark Trammell – lead, baritone, group owner; Pat Barker – bass; Dustin Sweatman – piano	Eric Phillips – tenor; Mark Trammell – lead, baritone, bass guitar group owner; Nick Trammell – lead, baritone; Pat Barker – bass; Gerald Wolfe – piano (Filled in on stages)	Dustin Black – tenor; Nick Trammell – lead, baritone; Mark Trammell – lead, baritone, group owner; Pat Barker – bass; Gerald Wolfe – piano (Filled in on stages)
2014–2015	2015–2017	2017–2019
Dustin Black – tenor; Mark Trammell – lead, baritone, group owner; Nick Trammell – lead, baritone; Randy Byrd – bass; Gerald Wolfe – piano (Filled in on stages)	Blake Buffin – tenor; Mark Trammell – lead, baritone, group owner; Nick Trammell – lead, baritone; Randy Byrd – bass; Gerald Wolfe – piano (Filled in on stages)	Blake Buffin – tenor; Nick Trammell – lead, baritone; Mark Trammell – lead, baritone, group owner; Randy Byrd – bass; Trevor Conkle – piano
2019–2022	2022–present
Stephen Adair – tenor; Nick Trammell – lead, baritone; Mark Trammell – lead, baritone, group owner; Randy Byrd – bass; Trevor Conkle – piano	Stephen Adair – tenor; Nick Trammell – lead, baritone; Mark Trammell – lead, baritone, group owner; Will Lane – bass; Trevor Conkle – piano

== Cathedrals Family Reunion Members ==
=== Lineups ===
2009	2012	2013–2014 (under the name "Cathedrals Family Reunion")
Danny Funderburk – tenor; Scott Fowler – lead; Mark Trammell – baritone, bass guitar; Glenn Dustin – bass; Tim Parton – piano; Gerald Wolfe – piano, vocals	Ernie Haase – tenor; Scott Fowler – lead; Mark Trammell – baritone, bass guitar; Glenn Dustin – bass; Gerald Wolfe – piano, vocals	Danny Funderburk – tenor; Ernie Haase – tenor; Scott Fowler – lead; Mark Trammell – baritone, bass guitar; Pat Barker – bass; Matt Fouch – bass; Paul Harkey – bass; Trey Ivey – piano; Gerald Wolfe – piano, vocals

== Discography ==
=== Mark Trammell Trio ===
- 2002: Love To Tell The Story
- 2003: Something Good
- 2003: Supply
- 2004: Beside Still Waters
- 2005: This Time
- 2006: Journey Thus Far
- 2007: Once Upon A Cross
- 2008: Always Have A Song
- 2008: Home For Christmas

=== Mark Trammell Quartet ===
- 2009: Vintage Gospel
- 2010: Testimony
- 2011: Treasures
- 2012: Lifetime
- 2013: LIVE in Louisville
- 2014: Your Walk Talks
- 2014: Home for Christmas (with The Whisnants)
- 2015: Rewind
- 2016: Full Sail
- 2018: Great Moments
- 2019: God Has Provided
- 2021: Still Standing
- 2024: Classic
