= Steve French (singer) =

- Born: September 24, 1959; Mascot, Tennessee, U.S.
- Died: June 22, 2016 (aged 56); Fayette County, West Virginia, U.S.
- Genres: Christian
- Occupation: Singer
- Years active: 1981 – December 2, 2014
- Formerly of: Kingdom Heirs

Steve French (September 24, 1959 – June 22, 2016) was an American baritone who was the emcee and owner of the Kingdom Heirs. Born in Mascot, Tennessee, French claimed in concert performances to have founded the group with his brother Kreis in 1981. Nevertheless, the historical record shows that the Kingdom Heirs were founded in Knoxville, Tennessee in 1971. Both Steve and Kreis French first forayed into musical performance in their church. Steve traveled with regional groups the Crystal River Boys and the King's Servants prior to joining the Kingdom Heirs in 1982.

In 2002, French and his brother faced the task of replacing three key group members who had all resigned at the same time. They managed to keep the group a fan favorite. In addition to his past responsibilities with the Kingdom Heirs, he served on the board of directors for the National Quartet Convention. On June 22, 2016, French and girlfriend, Lindsey Hudson, jumped to their death from the New River Gorge Bridge in Fayette County, West Virginia. They both had active arrest warrants.
