= Jimmy Blythe =

American pianist and composer

- Also known as: Duke Owens, George Jefferson
- Born: James Louis Blythe; May 20, 1901; South Keene, Kentucky, United States
- Died: June 14, 1931 (aged 30)
- Genres: Jazz, boogie-woogie
- Occupations: Musician, composer
- Instrument: Piano

James Louis Blythe (May 20, 1901 – June 14, 1931) was an American jazz and boogie-woogie pianist and composer. Blythe is known to have recorded as many as 300 piano rolls, and his song "Chicago Stomp" is considered one of the earliest examples of boogie-woogie music to be recorded.

== Biography ==
Blythe was born in South Keene, Kentucky, to former slaves turned-sharecroppers Richard and Rena Blythe. He was the youngest of five children to survive birth and became interested in the piano after observing local ragtime players. In 1917, he moved to Chicago, Illinois, where he worked in the Mavis Talcum Powder Company and studied the rudiments of piano, playing under the tutelage of orchestra leader Clarence M. Jones, who found some success as an arranger. Although Blythe's life between 1919 and 1922 is obscured, it is speculated that he began preparing compositions in Jones's recording studio and performed at nearby music clubs.

In early 1922, Blythe was hired by the Columbia Music Roll Company to record piano rolls that were accessible at home and early nickelodeons. Modeling some of his style after the teachings of Jones, he applied an increasingly popular octave and boogie bass, with signature rhythmic breaks, to credited recordings for Columbia and, later the Capitol Music Roll Company of Chicago. Writer Bill Edwards remarks that, despite the limitations of piano rolls, Blythe "was able to take simple popular songs and create an engaging performance from them in short order. Many of these were taken from the simple sheet music and expanded to include blues riffs, stride or boogie-woogie bass, and even pseudo-novelty figures. Musicians around Chicago and beyond worked to emulate his engaging style as his fame grew".

In April 1924, Blythe entered the recording studio with co-writer Alex J. Robinson to record for Paramount Records. One of the songs, "Chicago Stomp", became Blythe's most popular recording and made him the earliest boogie-woogie pianist to be recorded. It has also been suggested that his 1925 recording of "Jimmie Blues" influenced the work of Clarence "Pine Top" Smith and Albert Ammons. Blythe recorded with his own studio groups, including Blythe's Sinful Five, Jimmy Blythe and his Ragamuffins, and Blythe's Washboard Band, which usually featured clarinetist Jimmy O'Bryant. He accompanied recording sessions by Johnny Dodds, Ma Rainey, and Jimmy Bertrand, and made duets with Buddy Burton and Charlie Clark. In some instances when he penned songs with Robinson and other musicians such as Trixie Smith, he used the pseudonyms "Duke Owens" and "George Jefferson".

In 1930, Blythe substantially decreased his recording activity, appearing on two sides of Robinson's group, Knights of Rest. He was living with his sister and her husband when Blythe contracted meningitis. Blythe died on June 14, 1931, aged 30. In November 2021, the Killer Blues Headstone Project placed a headstone for him in Lincoln Cemetery in Blue Island, Illinois, 90 years after his actual burial.
