= Cathedral Quartet =

Former Southern Gospel Quartet 1964-1999

- Also known as: The Cathedrals, The Cathedral Trio
- Origin: Akron, Ohio United States
- Genres: Southern gospel, Contemporary christian
- Years active: 1963–1999
- Labels: Heart Warming; Eternal; Cannan; Riversong; Homeland

The Cathedral Quartet, also known as the Cathedrals, or the Cathedral Trio was an American southern gospel quartet who performed from 1964 to December 1999. The group's final lineup consisted of Glen Payne (lead), George Younce (bass), Ernie Haase (tenor), Scott Fowler (baritone and bass guitar), and Roger Bennett (piano and rhythm guitar).

== History ==
=== Formation and early years ===
The Cathedrals formed in 1963 as a trio consisting of the California Weatherford Quartet lead singer Glen Payne, tenor Bobby Clark, and baritone Danny Koker. Initially a house group of Rex Humbard's Cathedral of Tomorrow, they called themselves the Cathedral Trio. The group became a quartet with the addition of Blue Ridge Quartet bass singer George Younce in 1964. They decided to become a full-time touring group in 1969, leaving the Cathedral of Tomorrow. Koker and Clark left the group to pursue other interests, and were replaced by tenor Mack Taunton and baritone-pianist George Amon Webster. The group signed with Canaan Records; Canaan producer Marvin Norcross worked with them and Florida Boys lead singer Les Beasley to help the group gain exposure. Norcross gave them performance time on the nationally syndicated television The Gospel Singing Jubilee. With Canaan, the group experimented with different styles of dress and performance to find their identity.

=== Rise to prominence ===
Gospel singer Bill Gaither invited the group to perform at his annual Praise Gathering in Indianapolis, and they received more requests for appearances. Gaither collaborated with Younce and Payne to produce their future albums for Word Records. The group began incorporating Younce and Payne's comedy routines, and added Roy Tremble as a tenor. Tremble, Webster, and pianist Lorne Matthews left the group and started their own trio called "The Brothers" in 1979. Their first replacement, Kirk Talley of the Hoppers, was a tenor; Steve Lee was added to sing baritone and play piano. Shortly before 1980, the group hired Roger Bennett as their pianist after hearing him play for their opening act. Lee left the group, and former member Roger Horne filled in briefly before Kingsmen bass guitarist and baritone Mark Trammell joined the group. In 1983 they left Canaan (Word), and signed with Riversong (Benson).

=== 1980s ===
Talley left the group in the summer of 1983 to form the Talleys with his brother, Roger, and sister-in-law, Debra. Danny Funderburk of the Singing Americans was chosen to replace him in December of that year. This lineup remained in place for several years, until Bennett left to help found Journey Records. Bennett was replaced by young, classically trained pianist and vocalist Gerald Wolfe. With Wolfe at the piano and singing, the group contributed to Symphony of Praise a 1987 album with the London Philharmonic Orchestra. The album included "This Ole House", "Champion Of Love", "I Can See The Hand" (written by Steven Curtis Chapman), and "I've Just Started Living". During this period, the group added Trammell's bass guitar and a synthesizer to its quartet vocals.

=== 1990s: Gaither Homecoming years ===
In February 1990, Funderburk left to help form the quartet Perfect Heart. The Cathedrals hired tenor Kurt Young to replace him, but Young left the quartet after two months. Young was replaced by Ernie Haase, a young tenor from Indiana. Later that year, Trammell left to form Greater Vision with Gerald Wolfe. Scott Fowler, former lead singer of the Sound, became the quartet's baritone and bass guitarist; this was the final version of the Cathedrals. The full group (including present and former members, except for Danny Koker, Roger Horne, Lorne Matthews, Bill Dykes, Jim Garstang, Steve Lee and Kurt Young) recorded a concert, The Cathedral Quartet: A Reunion, in 1995.

Bill Gaither and the Gaither Vocal Band recorded Homecoming, a tribute to Southern gospel music, during the early 1990s. Gaither enlisted George Younce and Glen Payne for the album (which inspired the Gaither Homecoming videos), and the Cathedral Quartet was included on later videos in the series. In addition to touring and appearing in the Gaither Homecoming videos, the group appeared three times on NBC's Today show during the decade.

=== Final years and farewell tour ===
Younce and Payne's health began to decline; Younce had kidney failure and heart disease by 1999, and Payne was diagnosed with liver cancer. They decided to disband the group after a farewell tour, as the group's health permitted. The Gaithers and the Cathedrals recorded a live Cathedrals Farewell Celebration video on May 18, 1999, on which they were joined by The Statler Brothers, The Oak Ridge Boys, Sandi Patty, Guy Penrod, and the Gaither Vocal Band. The Cathedrals would make their final appearance at the National Quartet Convention without Payne. During a performance Payne called via telephone from his hospital bed, he sang the song I Won't Have to Cross Jordan Alone to which the audience gave him a standing ovation at the end. On October 15, 1999, Payne died from liver cancer aged 72. After Payne's death, Bennett sang Payne's part until the group's final concerts on December 9, 10, and 11, 1999 in Akron, Ohio.

=== After the group ===
In 2000, former members Fowler and Bennett formed the Southern gospel group Legacy Five; Fowler was the lead singer and bass guitarist, and Bennett was the group's emcee and pianist. Haase continued a solo career he had begun and, with Gaither's help, formed The Old Friends Quartet with Younce, Jake Hess, Wesley Pritchard, and Gold City alumnus Garry Jones on piano. They recorded two albums and a concert video for the Gaither Homecoming series, but Younce and Hess's poor health brought an end to the Old Friends two years later. In 2003, Haase and Garry Jones formed the Signature Sound Quartet. After Jones and Haase developed artistic differences, Jones left. Signature Sound Quartet became associated with Gaither and his Homecoming tour, and changed its name to Ernie Haase & Signature Sound.

After leaving the Cathedrals, Trammell was the original baritone of Greater Vision before leaving to join Gold City. In 2002, Trammell formed his own quartet called Mark Trammell Quartet. Gerald Wolfe is emcee and piano player with Greater Vision and Danny Funderburk has recorded solo and has been in several groups since leaving Perfect Heart. Kirk Talley had a solo career from the Talleys breakup to December 2012, when he developed vocal problems. On April 11, 2005, George Younce died from kidney failure, aged 75. On March 17, 2007, Roger Bennett died aged 48 after a 12-year battle with leukemia On February 17, 2008 original baritone Danny Koker died aged 74. In 2010, Ernie Haase & Signature Sound released A Tribute to the Cathedral Quartet DVD/album set and was nominated for Southern Gospel Album of the Year at the 42nd GMA Dove Awards.

On September 28, 2013 Webster died aged 67 from cancer. In 2014, former members Haase, Fowler, Funderburk, Trammell and Wofle (except for Talley) released the Cathedrals Family Reunion, a DVD/album set to commemorate the Cathedrals 35 year journey in stories and songs. On May 22, 2014 original tenor Bobby Clark died aged 78 from a stroke. In December 2017, Steve Lee died. On June 13, 2023 Roy Tremble died aged 76 from a brief illness. On September 28, 2023 Roger Horne died aged 77. On April 2, 2024 Haskell Cooley died aged 84 after battling Alzheimer's disease. On July 4, 2025 Mack Taunton died aged 81.

== Members ==
1963-1964 (As the Cathedral Trio)	1964-1967 (As the Cathedral Quartet)	1967-1969
Bobby Clark – tenor; Glen Payne – lead; Danny Koker – baritone, piano	Bobby Clark – tenor; Glen Payne – lead; Danny Koker – baritone, piano; George Younce – bass	Mack Taunton – tenor; Glen Payne – lead; Danny Koker – baritone, piano; George Younce – bass
1969-1971	1971	1971-1972
Mack Taunton – tenor; Glen Payne – lead; George Amon Webster – baritone, piano; George Younce – bass	Mack Taunton – tenor; Glen Payne – lead; George Amon Webster – baritone, bass guitar; George Younce – bass; Lorne Matthews – piano	Roger Horne – tenor; Glen Payne – lead; Roy Tremble – baritone; George Younce – bass; Lorne Matthews – piano, vocals
1972	1972-1973	1973-1974
Bobby Clark – tenor; Glen Payne – lead; Roy Tremble – baritone; George Younce – bass; Lorne Matthews – piano	Roy Tremble – tenor; Glen Payne – lead; Bill Dykes – baritone, bass guitar; George Younce – bass; Jim Garstang – piano	Roy Tremble – tenor; Glen Payne – lead; Bill Dykes – baritone, bass guitar; George Younce – bass; George Amon Webster – piano
1974-1979	1979	1979
Roy Tremble – tenor; Glen Payne – lead; George Amon Webster – baritone, bass guitar; George Younce – bass; Haskell Cooley – piano	Roy Tremble – tenor; Glen Payne – lead; George Amon Webster – baritone, bass guitar; George Younce – bass; Lorne Matthews – piano, vocals	Kirk Talley – tenor; Glen Payne – lead; Steve Lee – baritone, piano; George Younce – bass
1979-1980	1980	1980-1983
Kirk Talley – tenor; Glen Payne – lead; Steve Lee – baritone, bass guitar; George Younce – bass; Roger Bennett – piano	Kirk Talley – tenor, bass guitar; Glen Payne – lead; Roger Horne – baritone; George Younce – bass; Roger Bennett – piano	Kirk Talley – tenor; Glen Payne – lead; Mark Trammell – baritone, bass guitar; George Younce – bass; Roger Bennett – piano, vocals
1983-1986	1986-1988	1988-1990
Danny Funderburk – tenor; Glen Payne – lead; Mark Trammell – baritone, bass guitar; George Younce – bass; Roger Bennett – piano, vocals	Danny Funderburk – tenor; Glen Payne – lead; Mark Trammell – baritone, bass guitar; George Younce – bass; Gerald Wolfe – piano, vocals	Danny Funderburk – tenor; Glen Payne – lead; Mark Trammell – baritone, bass guitar; George Younce – bass; Roger Bennett – piano, vocals
1990	1990	1990-1999
Kurt Young – tenor; Glen Payne – lead; Mark Trammell – baritone, bass guitar; George Younce – bass; Roger Bennett – piano	Ernie Haase – tenor; Glen Payne – lead; Mark Trammell – baritone, bass guitar; George Younce – bass; Roger Bennett – piano, vocals	Ernie Haase – tenor; Glen Payne – lead; Scott Fowler – baritone, bass guitar; George Younce – bass; Roger Bennett – piano, vocals

== Cathedrals Family Reunion members ==
2009 (As Cathedrals Remember The Music)	2012	2013–2014 (As Cathedrals Family Reunion)
Danny Funderburk – tenor; Scott Fowler – lead; Mark Trammell – baritone, bass guitar; Glenn Dustin – bass; Tim Parton – piano; Gerald Wolfe – piano, vocals	Ernie Haase – tenor; Scott Fowler – lead; Mark Trammell – baritone, bass guitar; Glenn Dustin – bass; Gerald Wolfe – piano, vocals	Danny Funderburk – tenor; Ernie Haase – tenor; Scott Fowler – lead; Mark Trammell – baritone; Pat Barker – bass; Matt Fouch – bass; Paul Harkley – bass; Trey Ivey – piano; Wesley Pritchard – bass guitar; Gerald Wolfe – piano, vocals

== Discography ==
=== Studio albums ===
- 1963: Introducing the Cathedral Trio
- 1963: When the Saints Go Marching In
- 1964: Beyond the Sunset
- 1965: Taller Than Trees
- 1965: Presenting the Cathedral Quartet, Mariner’s Quartet, Gospel Harmony Boys
- 1965: The Cathedral Quartet with Strings
- 1966: The Cathedral Quartet with Brass
- 1966: Greatest Gospel Hits
- 1966: Land of the Bible
- 1967: I Saw the Light
- 1968: Family Album
- 1968: Focus On Glen Payne
- 1969: Jesus is Coming Soon
- 1970: I’m Nearer Home
- 1970: It’s Music Time
- 1970: A Little Bit of Everything
- 1971: Everything’s Alright
- 1971: Somebody Loves Me
- 1971: Right On
- 1972: Welcome to Our World
- 1973: Seniors in Session
- 1973: Town and Country
- 1973: The Last Sunday
- 1974: Our Statue of Liberty
- 1975: Plain Ole Gospel
- 1975: For Keeps
- 1976: The Cathedral Quartet Sings Albert E. Brumley Classics
- 1976: Easy on the Ears, Heavy on the Heart
- 1977: Then and Now
- 1978: One at a Time
- 1978: The Cathedral Quartet Featuring Oh, What a Love
- 1978: Sunshine And Roses
- 1979: You Ain’t Heard Nothing Yet
- 1979: Keep On Singing (2 Versions)
- 1979: Smooth as Silk
- 1980: Interwoven
- 1980: Better Than Ever
- 1980: Telling the World About His Love
- 1981: Cherish That Name
- 1981: Colors of His Love
- 1982: Something Special
- 1982: Greater
- 1982: Oh Happy Day
- 1983: Individually
- 1983: Voices in Praise/A Cappella
- 1984: Distinctively
- 1984: The Prestigious Cathedral Quartet
- 1985: An Old Convention Song
- 1985: Especially For You
- 1985: A Cathedral Christmas A Cappella
- 1986: Master Builder
- 1987: Land Of Living
- 1987: Symphony of Praise
- 1988: Goin’ In Style
- 1989: I've Just Started Living
- 1989: 25th Anniversary
- 1990: Climbing Higher and Higher
- 1991: The Best of Times
- 1993: High and Lifted Up
- 1993: Worship His Glory: Acapella Praise
- 1994: Raise the Roof: 30th Anniversary
- 1996: Radio Days
- 1998: Faithful
- 2013: Cathedrals Family Reunion

=== Live albums ===
- 1974: Live in Concert
- 1979: Live With The Cathedral Quartet
- 1983: Live in Atlanta
- 1986: Travelin’ Live
- 1992: Camp Meeting (Live)
- 1995: A Reunion (recorded live in 1993)
- 1997: Alive! Deep In The Heart Of Texas
- 1999: A Farewell Celebration
- 1999: Live in Jacksonville
- 2012: Moody Radio Presents... Live In Chicago (recorded live in 1996)
- 2014: Cathedrals Family Reunion: Past Members Reunite Live In Concert

=== Compilations ===
- 1971: Hits (Eternal)
- 1971: Request Time (Skylite)
- 1976: The Best Of The Cathedral Quartet (Eternal)
- 1976: Music Time (Eternal)
- 1979: Then I Found Jesus (Eternal)
- 1979: Oh What A Love (Eternal)
- 1980: Special
- 1982: A Collection of Their Best (Canaan)
- 1983: Favorites Old and New (old recordings and new recordings)
- 1983: Featuring George Younce
- 1983: Featuring Glen Payne
- 1984: Classics (Heartwarming)
- 1986: Classics Vol. 2 (Heartwarming)
- 1988: Collection, Volume 1 (Riversong)
- 1989: Collection, Volume 2 (Riversong)
- 1990: The Collector’s Series (Homeland)
- 1991: Collection, Volume 3 (Riversong)
- 1993: Some of Their Finest Moments
- 1995: 20 Favorites Volume 1 (Benson)
- 1996: 20 Favorites Volume 2 (Benson)
- 1996: The Cathedral Collection (Homeland)
- 1998: 20 Gospel Classics (Landmark)
- 1999: Anthology: A 35 Year Musical Journey (Homeland)
- 1999: Through the Years: 21 Favorite Hymns and Songs of the Church (Homeland)
- 1999: 20 Convention Classics (Diamante)
- 1999: Hymns and Spiritual Songs (Riversong/Heartwarming/Benson)
- 2000: Signature Songs, Vol. 1 (Homeland)
- 2000: Signature Songs, Vol. 2 (Homeland)
- 2000: Southern Gospel Treasury Series (Epic Records)
- 2000: Super Hits (Word Records)
- 2002: Years Gone By, Vol 1 (Homeland)
- 2002: The Best of the Cathedrals (Canaan)
- 2003: Live in Concert/Live With the Cathedral Quartet (Cathedral)

=== Appearances on the Gaither Homecoming videos ===
- 1994: A Christmas Homecoming - "God Rest Ye Merry Gentlemen"
- 1994: The Cathedrals: 50 Faithful Years - All songs
- 1995: The Sweetest Song I Know - "An Old Convention Song"
- 1996: Moments to Remember - "This Old House"
- 1997: Feelin' At Home - "New Born Feeling"
- 1997: This Is My Story - "Boundless Love"
- 1998: Singing With The Saints - "Mexico"
- 1999: Singin' In My Soul - "He Made A Change"
- 2000: Good News - "Trying To Get A Glimpse"
