= The Weatherfords =

American musical group

- Also known as: Weatherford Quartet; Weatherford Trio
- Origin: Akron Ohio, Long Beach, California, U.S. Paoli, Oklahoma Since 1977
- Genres: Christian, southern gospel
- Years active: Early 1940s – present
- Labels: RCA Victor, Heart Warming Skylite

The Weatherfords (also Weatherford Quartet and Weatherford Trio) is an American southern gospel music vocal group.

The Weatherfords were formed by husband and wife Earl Weatherford and Lily Weatherford, who began singing together in the mid-1940s in Long Beach, California, after their marriage in 1944. Earl had founded the group prior to this as an all-male troupe, and Lily began filling in on the tenor parts in 1948, eventually becoming the group's most visible member.

They moved several times over the next few decades, to Fort Wayne, Indiana, Akron, Ohio, Fontana and Sacramento, California (as part of the staff of Calvary Temple), and then relocated to Paoli, Oklahoma in 1977 and are based out of there today.

The group sang on California radio stations (KFOX- KBGR-KBIG ) in the 1940s, and was offered a full-time spot on radio station WOWO in Fort Wayne, Indiana, in 1949. In the 1950s, they recorded for RCA Victor. In 1959, The quartet's In The Garden album for RCA was produced by Chet Atkins, and also featured guitar work by Atkins. It was recorded in Nashville at RCAs Studio B. They also worked in collaboration with evangelist Rex Humbard between 1953 and 1963. The group's other key members at this time were Glen Payne, Armond Morales, and Henry Slaughter.

The Weatherfords departed Akron, Ohio, for California in 1963, and the groups The Cathedrals and The Imperials were formed from members of the Weatherfords at this time as well.

Other notable members included Dallas Holm, whose time with the group was short due to his draft requirements during the Vietnam War; Jim Hammel, who went on to be a long-time member of the Kingsmen Quartet; Glen Payne and George Younce of The Cathedrals. David Engles, who now owns and operates a radio network out of Tulsa, Oklahoma (KNYD); and Dave Roland (Dave & Sugar).

The Weatherfords were featured on Greystone Productions: The History Of Southern Gospel Music, that was featured on many PBS stations in the mid 1990s, as well as several of the early editions of the Gaither Homecoming Videos, Grand Ole Gospel Reunion, and multiple main stage appearances at The National Quartet Convention for several years.

The Weatherfords are still touring nationally with up to 250 concerts per year. Earl Weatherford died in 1992. A few years later in 1999, Lily published an autobiography, With All My Heart. She performed with the Weatherfords and retired in June 2013. After 70 years of full time ministry Earl and Lily Weatherford were both inducted into the Southern Gospel Museum and Hall of Fame in 2000.

== Members ==
It is believed the Weatherfords may hold the record for having the most members in a Gospel music group, having had over 100 members over a 70-year period.

Some members have included:

- Earl Weatherford (1922–92): baritone 1944–1992
- Lily Fern Goble Weatherford (1928–2025): tenor/alto 1945, 1948–1961, 1963–2013
- Steven Earl Weatherford: 1976–present
- Skylar Weatherford; 2006–present
- Les Roberson: lead 1948–1955
- James Hamill: lead 19??–1956
- George Younce: bass 19??–1956
- Armond Morales (1932–2022): bass 1958–1964 (went on to The Imperials)
- Glen Payne (1926–99): lead 1957–1963 (went on to form The Cathedrals)
- James Hopkins: tenor 1961
- Henry Slaughter (1927–2020): piano 19??–1963 (went on to The Imperials)
- James Clark: piano 1964–1966
- Billy Brisendine: lead 19??–1966
- Tracy Dartt (b. 1944): bass 19??–1973
- Fulton Nash: bass 19??–1973
- Roy-Pauley;19??-2023
- James Holbrook: piano 197?–197?
- Haskell Cooley: piano 1972–1974 (went on to The Cathedrals)
- Glenn Couch (b. 1935): 1966
- Bob Thacker: bass 19??–1966
- Cody Boyer: baritone 2007–2010
- Terry Robertson: 2010
- Foster Smith: 1946 or 47??
- Kelley Looper: Baritone 2000-2006
- Lajuanna Murphy Brann: Piano-2010-2018

Kenny Payne: Bass,Baritone,Piano 1990-1994,1995-1997
