= George Amon Webster =

American singer

- Born: December 10, 1945; Milligan Ridge, Arkansas, U.S.
- Died: September 28, 2013 (aged 67) Daytona Beach, Florida, U.S.
- Genres: Southern Gospel
- Years active: 1959–2011
- Formerly of: Cathedral Quartet; The Brothers; The Heartland Boys; George Amon Webster Trio; Selah; The Toney Brothers

George Amon Webster (December 10, 1945 – September 28, 2013) was the baritone vocalist and the pianist with the Cathedral Quartet from 1969 through 1971, their pianist from 1973 through 1974, and their baritone vocalist and bassist from 1974 through 1979. George Webster wrote "Thanks For Loving Me" and the critically acclaimed song, "He Loves Me", during his second stint with the Cathedrals.

Webster had also been a member of The Templeaires Quartet, The Salvation Singing Society, The Calvarymen Quartet, The Brothers, Destiny, The Frontiersmen, The Heartland Boys, George Amon Webster Trio, Selah, and the Toney Brothers.

Webster died of cancer on September 28, 2013.
