= Dallas Holm =

American singer

- Born: November 5, 1948 (age 77)
- Origin: St. Paul Park, Minnesota US
- Genres: CCM, Worship, Christian country
- Occupations: Singer, songwriter, instrumentalist worship leader
- Instruments: Piano; Guitar
- Years active: 1965–present
- Website: www.dallasholm.com

Dallas Holm (born November 5, 1948) is an American singer-songwriter of Christian music, whose musical ministry has spanned almost four decades. His 1977 live album, with the group Praise, featured his best known song, "Rise Again".

The group consisted of Dallas Holm on acoustic guitar and vocals, Tim and Ladonna Johnson on keyboards and vocals, and Randy Adams on bass. Holm's influence has been greatest in contemporary Christian music. While he has had several hit singles in CCM, he is best known for "Rise Again", which is about the resurrection of Jesus. Over the course of Holm's career, he has performed many styles of music including adult contemporary, country, blues, reggae and pop-rock.

Holm remains active as the director of praise ministries and is a member of the Christian Motorcyclists Association.

== History ==
Holm, a native of Minnesota, was inspired by Elvis Presley and the Byrds when he was growing up and, while in high school, was a member of a rock band. After Holm came to faith in 1965 at the age of 16, he desired to combine his music with his newfound faith. He started writing his own Christian songs around this time performing them in jails, churches and in street ministry. During the late 60s, Holm was a member of a Christian group called the Tri-Tones who made an album entitled I Saw the Light released by the Universal Audio Corp. He expanded his use of music while he was a youth pastor in the Dallas-Ft. Worth area. Holm's music eventually caught the attention of David Wilkerson, author of The Cross and the Switchblade, and became a part of Wilkerson's traveling crusades. In the late 1960s, he sang briefly with The Weatherfords before military service cut his time with the group short.

As a solo artist, his early albums for Zondervan and Impact contained worship songs done in a MOR rock style. During his time with Wilkerson, Holm became the front man for a group named Praise. Aside from Holm, other members of Dallas Holm & Praise consisted of Randy Adams (bass - replaced by Rick Crawford in 1980), Ric Norris (drums), Tim Johnson (keyboards), and LaDonna Gatlin Johnson (vocals). This group released the album Dallas Holm & Praise. . .Live (Greentree, 1977) which sold more than 600,000 copies and was the first Christian album to be certified gold. This album contains the song Rise Again which was one of the biggest radio hits in the history of Christian music. The song has the distinction of garnering a GMA Dove Award in 1978 for Song of the Year. Holm was awarded Songwriter of the Year along with Male Vocalist of the Year in 1978 with the group itself winning Mixed Group of the Year.

Over the course of Holm's career he has released 34 albums counting solo, with Praise or other artists. He has received a total of five Dove Awards as of 2020. Holm has also been inducted into the Texas Gospel Music Hall of Fame (2007) and the GMA Gospel Music Hall of Fame in 2012.

Holm was married to Linda until her death on December 30, 2023. They had been married for 54 years. Their children, both grown, are Jennifer and Jeffrey.

== Discography ==
- 1966 Just a Closer Walk: Dallas Holm, Phil Ekstedt, Don Moore (Sacred Knot Recordings)
- 1969 I Saw the Light (Universal Audio Corporation)
- 1970 Dallas Holm (Teen)
- 1971 For Teens Only (Singcord Records [Zondervan])
- 1971 Just the Way I Feel It (Now Sounds)
- 1972 Looking Back (Impact Records R3139)
- 1973 Didn't He Shine (Impact Records)
- 1974 Peace, Joy & Love (Impact Records)
- 1975 Nothing But Praise (Impact Records)
- 1976 Dallas Holm—Just Right (Greentree Records)
- 1977 Dallas Holm & Praise...Live—Rise Again (Greentree Records)(RIAA Gold Certified)
- 1978 Tell 'Em Again (Greentree Records R3480)
- 1979 His Last Days (Greentree Records R3534)
- 1979 All That Matters (Greentree Records R3558)
- 1980 Looking Back: The Very Best of Dallas Holm (Greentree Records)
- 1980 This is My Song (Greentree Records)
- 1981 Holm, Sheppard & Johnson (Greentree Records)
- 1981 I Saw the Lord (Greentree Records R3723)
- 1983 Signal (Greentree Records)
- 1985 Classics (Greentree Records)
- 1985 Change The World (Dayspring)
- 1986 Praise and Worship (Greentree Records)
- 1986 Against the Wind (Dayspring)
- 1988 Beyond the Curtain (Dayspring)
- 1989 Soldiers Again: Holm Sheppard & Johnson (Dayspring)
- 1990 Through the Flame (Dayspring)
- 1991 The Early Works (Benson Records)
- 1992 Chain of Grace (Benson Records)
- 1993 Mesa [by Mesa (Dallas Holm, Dana Key and Jerry Williams)]
- 1993 Completely Taken In (Benson Records)
- 1994 Holm for Christmas (Ministry Music)
- 1995 Face of Mercy (Benson Records)
- 1999 Before Your Throne (Ministry Music)
- 1999 Signature Songs (Greentree)
- 2002 Foundations (Ministry Music)
- 2005 Good News Blues (Ross Records)
- 2011 Songs of Hope and Comfort (Holm Run Records)

== Awards ==
Dove Awards

- 1977
  - Song of the Year: "Rise Again"
  - Songwriter of the Year
  - Male Vocalist of the Year
  - Mixed Group of the Year (Dallas Holm and Praise)
- 1979
  - Male Vocalist of the Year
  - Pop/Contemporary Album: All That Matters (Dallas Holm and Praise)
- 1992
  - Inspirational Album of the Year: Generation 2 Generation (Benson artists and their families)

Grammy nominations

- 1987
  - Best Gospel Performance – Male: "Against the Wind"
- 2007
  - Inducted into the Texas Gospel Music Hall of Fame
- 2012
  - Inducted into the Gospel Music Hall of Fame
