= Jeremy Lile =

American singer

- Genres: Christian

Jeremy Lile was bass singer for the Southern Gospel quartet Brian Free and Assurance from 2008 to September 2015 when he had to step down for health reasons. Jeremy was honored with the Singing News Fans Favourite Horizon Individual Award in 2008.
