= Kingdom Heirs =

American Southern gospel quartet

The Kingdom Heirs Quartet
- Origin: Knoxville, Tennessee
- Genres: Christian, Southern gospel
- Years active: 1971–present
- Label: Sonlite
- Members: Chris Bryant; Andy Stringfield; Brad Smith; Dennis Murphy; Kreis French; John Young
- Website: www.kingdomheirs.com

The Kingdom Heirs Quartet is a Southern gospel quartet based at Dollywood in Pigeon Forge, Tennessee.

== History ==
The Kingdom Heirs formed in 1971 in Knoxville, Tennessee. Original members included Patty Wilson (alto), Jim Bluford (tenor), Gene McKinney (lead), Raymond Parker (bass), and a 13-year-old Gary Bilyeu (piano). Gary Arnold was added on bass guitar and 13-year-old drummer Jim Ford came close behind with Tom Bailey on rhythm guitar. The name Kingdom Heirs was chosen by the group from James 2:5. After they began expanding their singing beyond local churches, Wilson, Parker, and Arnold left the group for various reasons, and Steve Gouge replaced Arnold on bass guitar in July 1971. Mike Shuemaker joined to sing baritone in August of that same year.

After learning of a group from near Sparta, Tennessee who was using the name Kingdom Heirs, rather than checking legal availability for Kingdom Heirs, the group simply added New and became the New Kingdom Heirs. In 1974 they incorporated as a non-profit under that name. That same year Larry Hutson joined the group on lead guitar, Duane Wyrick became Bass vocal and in 1975 after short stints by Johnny Trott and Mark Nipper, Buddy Mulkey took tenor vocal, while Tommy Rowe assumed baritone vocal. Larry's father, Bill Hutson, began managing the group. From 1972 to 1982 their ministry grew substantially and their booking schedule began to expand. Manager Bill Hutson arranged TV, radio, church and concert appearances from Michigan to Florida. Along the way, well known gospel music promoter and host of the widely syndicated Mull's Singing Convention television show Rev. J. Bazzell Mull took note and started using the New Kingdom Heirs in concerts and television.

Rev. Mull's recommendation in 1977 opened the door for an audition and their first performance and long association with Silver Dollar City in Pigeon Forge, Tennessee, now Dollywood. They first sang at the October Craft Festival, then the spring Young Christians Day and mid-summer Mountain Music Festival, which all became annual appearances. In 1979, at the prompting of promoter Rev. J. Bazzell Mull, they secured a registered trademark for the name Kingdom Heirs, and dropped the word "new" from the group name and began recording and appearing as The Kingdom Heirs. The late'70s saw 3 new albums recorded on Trail Records and produced by Jim Hamell, of The Kingsmen, and Bobby All. By 1981, The Kingdom Heirs, with band, had expanded to a total of 12 members (including manager Bill Hutson) and recorded their 10th Anniversary Edition in Nashville, with acclaimed producer and musician Gary Prim. In late 1982, after the departure earlier in the year of the band's bass singer of the previous eight years, Duane Wyrick, six more members of the band retired, including founding members Gene McKinney, Gary Bilyeu, and Jim Ford along with Steve Gouge, Buddy Mulkey and bass Jeff Crisp. With Wayne Mitchell who had replaced Tommy Rowe, Larry Hutson, George Beeler (who had replaced Jim Ford), steel player Ron Ward and manager Bill Hutson remaining, they brought in David McGill (lead), Steve French (baritone), Kreis French (bass guitar), and Randall Hunley (piano).

== Musical career ==
The Kingdom Heirs perform multiple shows daily at Dollywood during the months that the park is open. While the park is closed, they tour just like any other group. The group has been at the park since 1977, when it was known as Silver Dollar City. It is estimated that they sing to over 2 million people each year – more than any other Southern gospel group. Despite a short travel schedule, the guys always take time to join in the Gospel Celebration at the National Quartet Convention.

The Kingdom Heirs have also had many top ten songs, and currently have had 31 top 5 songs in a row and 10 number 1 songs including their latest number 1 song, "I'll Know I'm Home" along with "The Borrowed Tomb" and "Just Beyond The Sunset" which is off of the Redeeming the Time. Many other number 1s include, "Just Preach Jesus", "Tell Me Why" and "He Locked the Gates". Over the past years they have had 26 songs nominated for Song of the Year, including songs like - "Just Beyond the Sunset" "Just Preach Jesus", "The Joys of Heaven", "That's Why I Love to Call His Name", "I Know I'm Going There", "Forever Changed", "What We Needed". The Kingdom Heirs have been nominated many times for industry awards such as the SGMA Awards and Dove Awards. Winning Newcomer Group of the Year in 1989, the group has been a constant favorite. The latest award is 2016 Band of the Year, which the band also won in 2002, 2004, 2005, 2006, 2013, and 2014.

== Members ==
The current group consists of John Young (tenor and guitar), Chris Bryant (lead), Andy Stringfield (baritone and piano), Brad Smith (bass), Dennis Murphy (drums), and Kreis French (owner and bass guitar).

Alto

- Patty Wilson (1971)

Tenor

- Jim Bluford (1971–1974)
- Johnny Trot (1974–1975)
- Mark Nipper (1975)
- Buddy Mulkey (1975–1982)
- Wayne Mitchell (1982–87)
- Rick Strickland (1987–92) (went on to sing for JD Sumner among others)
- David Walker (1992–1994)
- David Sutton (1994–2002) (went on to form Triumphant Quartet)
- Jodi Hosterman (2002–2005)
- Billy Hodges (2005–2011) (formerly of Florida Boys and Dixie Echoes)
- Jerry A. Martin (2011–2021) (formerly of Kingsmen Quartet)
- Jacob Ellison (2021–2023)
- Joshua Horrell (2023–2025) (formerly of Kingsmen Quartet)
- John Young (2025-present)

Lead

- Gene McKinney (1971–1982)
- David McGill (1982–89) (died January 2, 2025)
- Clayton Inman (1989–94) (went on to form Triumphant Quartet)
- Steve Lacey (1994–95) (formerly of Gold City)
- Arthur Rice (1996–2022) (formerly of Kingsmen Quartet)
- Loren Harris (2022–2023) (formerly of The Perrys)
- Chris Bryant (2023-present) (formerly of Kingsmen Quartet)

Baritone

- Mike Shuemaker (August 1971–1975)
- Tommy Rowe (1975–1981)
- David McGill (1981)
- Wayne Mitchell (1981–1982, switch to tenor)
- Steve French (1982–2014, died on June 22, 2016)
- Andy Stringfield (2014–2015, 2022–present)
- Brian Alvey (2015–2016) (formerly of Tribute Quartet and also associated with The Talleys)
- Loren Harris (2016–2022)

Bass

- Raymond Parker (1971)
- Duane Wyrick (1974–1982)
- Jeff Crisp (1982)
- Eric Hawkins (1982–1985)
- Jody Medford (1986)
- Bob Caldwell (1987–1992) (went on to Statesmen Quartet and Brian Free & Assurance)
- Eric Bennett (1992–2002) (went on to form Triumphant Quartet)
- Jeff Chapman (2002–2023) (went on to Gold City)
- Brad Smith (2023–present)

Piano, keyboards

- Gary Bilyeu (1971–1982)
- Randall Hunley (1982–1992)
- Jamie Graves (1992–1999)
- Jeff Stice (1999–2002, died on September 14, 2021) (known for many including The Nelons, The Blackwood Brothers, and later Triumphant Quartet)
- Adam Harman (2002–2007)
- Joseph Cox (2007)
- Andy Stringfield (2007–present)

Drums

- Jim Ford (1971–1982)
- George Beeler (1982–1983)
- David Hoskins (1984)
- Rich Wilson (1985–88)
- Stephen Arant (1988–90)
- Dennis Murphy (1990–present) (formerly serving The Greenes)

Bass guitar

- Gary Arnold (1971)
- Steve Gouge (July 1971–1982)
- Kreis French (1982–2025)
- Timmy Waggoner (2026-Present)

Lead guitar

- Larry Hutson (1974–1983)
- Brian Alvey (2015-2016)
- John Young (2023–2025)

Steel guitar

- Dale McPhearson (1978–1979)
- Ron Ward (1979–1983)

Rhythm guitar

- Tom Bailey (1971–1973)

Manager

- Bill Hutson (1975–1983)
- Kreis French (2023–present)

== Discography ==
- 1972 That Day Is Almost Here
- 1973 All Aboard
- 1975 Especially For You
- 1976 Heaven On the Horizon
- 1976 Old Fashioned Gospel
- 1978 Seed Sower
- 1979 I'll Gain More Than I'm Missing
- 1981 10th Anniversary Edition
- 1982 The Kingdom Heirs (Later Changed To Vol. 5)
- 1983 Just Arrived
- 1984 Special Edition
- 1985 Southern Live
- 1986 Heirlooms
- 1986 The Good Times
- 1987 Favorites
- 1987 Pure Gold
- 1988 Classics
- 1988 Live In Concert (video)
- 1988 Steppin' On the Bright Side
- 1989 From the Heart
- 1990 Live At Dollywood
- 1991 Good Christian Men Rejoice (Christmas)
- 1992 Extraordinary
- 1992 Telling the World
- 1993 Song of Praise (CD and Video)
- 1993 Timeless
- 1994 Satisfied
- 1995 Forever Gold
- 1996 Feelin' At Home
- 1997 Anchored
- 1997 Christian Family
- 1997 My Father Is Rich
- 1998 Anchored Live
- 1998 Reflections
- 1999 A Christmas Celebration (Christmas)
- 1999 Talley Ho, Ho, Ho! (with Kirk Talley)
- 1999 The Journey Home
- 2000 City of Light
- 2000 Impressions (band)
- 2001 Classic Collection double CD
- 2001 Journey Home (video)
- 2001 Live In the Smokies (video)
- 2001 Shadows of the Past
- 2002 Anchored (video)
- 2002 City of Light (video)
- 2002 Gonna Keep Telling
- 2002 N' Tune (band)
- 2002 Together In Song (video)
- 2003 Going On With the Song
- 2003 Sing It Again
- 2004 Forever Changed
- 2004 Going On with the Song: Live (video)
- 2004 Lyrics Not Included (band)
- 2004 Spirit of Christmas
- 2005 Give Me the Mountain
- 2005 Series One
- 2006 Live in Grand Style (video)
- 2006 Off the Record
- 2006 White Christmas
- 2007 True to the Call
- 2008 From the Red Book Vol. 1
- 2009 From the Red Book Vol. 2
- 2009 When You Look at Me
- 2010 25th Anniversary
- 2010 It's Christmas
- 2010 Live at Dollywood (DVD/CD set)
- 2011 By Request
- 2011 We Will Stand Our Ground
- 2012 From the Red Book Vol. 3
- 2013 Redeeming the Time
- 2013 The Heart of Christmas
- 2015 30th Anniversary
- 2015 From the Red Book Vol 4
- 2015 A New Look
- 2015 Glory to God in the Highest
- 2016 Something Good
- 2017 Last Big Thing
- 2019 Everything in Between
- 2019 Something Good Volume 2
- 2021 I Feel A Good Day Coming On
- 2023 Something Good Volume 3
- 2024 No Better Time
- 2025 Fortieth Anniversary
