= Buddy Burton =

W. E. "Buddy" Burton (10 January 1890 – 6 July 1977) was a multi-instrumentalist and band leader who appeared on many 1920s Chicago South Side jazz and Blues 78 rpm Phonograph records as vocalist and drummer, and also played washboard, piano, celeste, and kazoo. He was born in Louisville, Kentucky and went to Chicago around 1922. He first recorded with Jelly Roll Morton and sessions that were led by Jimmy Blythe. Burton released five sides under his own name in 1928, six sides with Marcus Norman (as "Alabama Jim And George" which some experts have listed as being made with Bob Hudson, although Norman is credited with co-writing), two sides as a duo with Blythe and one with Irene Sanders. He also backed blues singers Tillie Johnson and Mae Mathews, and played with the Dixie Four and The Harlem Trio. Other than five numbers in 1929, duets with pianist Bob Hudson in 1932, and the duet with Sanders in 1936, little is known about Burton's life after the mid-thirties although he was probably somewhat active. He died of a self-inflicted gunshot wound while living in senior housing in Louisville, Kentucky and was reported to be a 'retired musician and elevator operator'.
