= Triumphant Quartet =

American Southern Gospel music group

The Triumphant Quartet
- Genres: Christian, Southern Gospel
- Years active: 2002–present
- Labels: StowTown
- Members: David Sutton; Clayton Inman; Sean Barber; Eric Bennett
- Past members: Scott Inman; Jeff Stice (deceased); GW Southard; Aaron Dishman
- Website: www.triumphantquartet.com

The Triumphant Quartet (formerly Integrity Quartet until 2005) is an American Southern Gospel group that group consists of David Sutton (tenor), Clayton Inman (baritone), Sean Barber (lead), and Eric Bennett (bass).

== Background ==
The Triumphant Quartet performed at The Miracle Theater in Pigeon Forge, Tennessee from 2003 through 2005, when it was known as The Louise Mandrell Theater. They now travel on a full-time concert schedule. Their songs, "I Bring You Forgiveness", "Don't Let the Sandals Fool Ya", "Hey, Jonah", "The Great I Am Still Is", "The Old White Flag", and "When the Trumpet Sounds" "Somebody Died For Me", "Love Came Calling", "Saved By Grace", "Take It From Me, Meshach", and "Because He Loved Me", were given Singing News Fan Awards nominations for Favorite Song of the Year in 2004, 2006, 2007, 2008, 2009, 2010, 2011, 2012, 2013 and 2014 respectively. The group was bestowed the honor of the "Favorite Traditional Male Quartet" award by the magazine's readers from 2009–2014.

David Sutton, Clayton Inman, and Eric Bennett all sang previously with the Kingdom Heirs. Jeff Stice played piano for The Kingdom Heirs. They left to form their own quartet, bringing in Clayton's son Scott as baritone.

Since that time, until 2023, their vocal lineup has stayed the same, which is rare in the Southern Gospel genre. When the group was formed in 2003, it was originally named the Integrity Quartet, but its name was changed to the Triumphant Quartet in 2005. The band's 2009 album, Everybody, was nominated for the Best Southern/Country/Bluegrass Gospel Album Grammy Award. Many of the group's early works were self-released, but the group is currently signed with Stowtown Records; it was previously on the Mansion Entertainment label. In 2019, their album, Yes, charted at No. 46 on the Billboard Top Christian Albums chart and won the Dove Award for Southern Gospel Album of the Year in 2019.

In 2023, Scott Inman left the group to pursue a solo career and was replaced by Sean Barber.

== Group members ==
=== Vocalists ===
- Lead/Baritone: Clayton Inman (2002–present)
- Baritone: Scott Inman (2002-2023)
- Lead: Sean Barber (2023—present)
- Tenor: David Sutton (2002–present)
- Bass: Eric Bennett (2002–present)

=== Musicians ===
- Piano: Jeff Stice (2002–2014, died on September 14, 2021)
- Piano: GW Southard (2014–2016)
- Piano: Aaron Dishman (2016–2019)

== Discography ==
- Southern Gospel-Quartet Style (2003)
- Four Guys and a Piano Player, Vol.1 (2003)
- Home Free (2004)
- You Better Hurry Up (2005)
- Triumphant Quartet (2005)
- Treasures (2006)
- Live from 5 (2006)
- You Gotta Love It (2007)
- We Need a Little Christmas (2007)
- Intermission (2008)
- Look To God (2008)
- Everyday (2009) (Grammy Award nomination 2010)
- Lyric and Melody (2010)
- Love Came Calling (2010)
- Songs from the Heart (2011)
- The Greatest Story (2013)
- Awesome God (2014)
- Acoustic (2015)
- Living in Harmony (2015)
- Thankful (2017)
- Yes (2019)
- Bigger Than Sunday (2021)
- Hymns and Worship (2023)
- God Is Listening (2024)
