= George Younce =

American singer (1930–2005)

Background information
- Born: George Wilson Younce; February 22, 1930; Patterson, North Carolina, U.S.
- Died: April 11, 2005 (aged 75) Akron, Ohio, U.S.
- Genre: Southern gospel
- Occupation: Singer
- Instrument: Voice
- Years active: 1946–2005
- Formerly of: The Cathedral Quartet, Old Friends Quartet

George Wilson Younce (/jɑːns/ YAHNS; February 22, 1930 – April 11, 2005) was a Southern gospel bass vocalist, known for performing with Southern gospel quartets, especially The Cathedral Quartet.

== Biography ==
Born in Patterson, North Carolina, Younce was the youngest of four siblings. His father was his biggest influence when young Younce decided he wanted to be a singer. In 1936, the Younce family moved to Lenoir, North Carolina. At the age of 15 in his hometown, George received his first taste of Southern Gospel music. As a teenager, Younce joined his first quartet, known as the Spiritualaires. When his voice changed, he switched to the bass part that he would sing for the rest of his life.

Over the next decade he traveled with such groups as the Homeland Harmony Quartet, The Weatherfords, the Florida Boys, and the Blue Ridge Quartet. In September 1963, the "Cathedral Trio", became the official vocal group of Rex Humbard's "Cathedral of Tomorrow" in Akron, Ohio. In November 1964, Younce joined forces with lead singer Glen Payne, Tenor Bobby Clark and Baritone/Piano Player Danny Koker to form the "Cathedral Quartet" out of the "Cathedral Trio". They toured the world for 36 years.

Younce performed on the Gaither Homecoming Tour, at Radio City Music Hall and Carnegie Hall in New York City, and at the Billy Graham Crusades in Cleveland, Ohio, and Nashville, Tennessee. His television appearances include the "Rex Humbard Hour", The Gospel Singing Jubilee, the “Bill Gaither Homecoming Hour”, NBC’s Today Show, The Nashville Network, “Prime Time Country”, and “The Statler Brothers Show”.

Younce was a 14-time recipient of the Singing News Fan Award for “Favorite Southern Gospel Bass” singer. He was Gospel Music’s "Living Legend" of the year in 1988, was inducted into the "Southern Gospel Music Hall of Fame" located in Dollywood in 1998, also inducted in the Gospel Music Hall of Fame in 1999. He was awarded the 2004 SGN Scoops Diamond “Lifetime Achievement Award”. He recorded well over 100 projects including the award-winning “Symphony of Praise” with the London Philharmonic Orchestra. Younce also wrote several Southern Gospel songs including the classic "Yesterday".

In 1998, Younce recorded the first of three solo projects. Two were GMA nominees for Dove Awards in the Southern Gospel Album of the Year category. The third presents a collection of some of his favorite hymns.

With the death of his long-time friend and Cathedrals partner Glen Payne in October 1999, and Younce's failing kidneys, the Cathedrals retired in December 1999. In the fall of 2000, he appeared for the first time without the Cathedrals as a solo performer in Parkersburg, West Virginia on a show called "An Evening with George Younce and Ernie Haase". Late in his career, he sang with The Old Friends Quartet, which included his son-in-law, former Cathedral tenor Ernie Haase and Southern Gospel legend Jake Hess and baritone Wesley Pritchard and pianist Garry Jones. Younce also provided the voice for some of the characters in several of the Bill Gaither produced "Gaither's Pond" children's videos. Although he had to stop officially touring, he did make occasional "special appearances" with son-in-law Ernie's new quartet Ernie Haase and Signature Sound, and with his friend Bill Gaither and the Homecoming Tour. His final concert appearance was on September 18, 2004 in Cleveland, Ohio.

=== Death ===
Younce suffered from heart trouble as well as kidney failure, and was on dialysis during the last years of his life. He died on April 11, 2005, aged 75 at the Akron City Hospital in Ohio. He and his wife, Clara, would have celebrated their 50th wedding anniversary on April 27.

On August 10, 2009, George's second daughter Dana died aged 47 and then on December 31, 2017, George's youngest daughter Tara died aged 42 from cancer. On May 12, 2020 George's wife Clara died aged 83 from heart failure.

== Awards ==
- SGMA Hall Of Fame (1998)
- GMA Hall Of Fame (1999)
- Singing News Fan Awards:
  - Favorite Male Singer (1999, 2000)
  - Favorite Bass Singer (1981, 1983, 1984, 1986, 1987, 1988, 1992, 1993, 1994, 1995, 1996, 1997, 1998, 1999)

== Discography ==
=== Solo ===
- 1997: I Believe (Spring Hill Records/CMD5412)
- 1998: That Says It All (Spring Hill Records/CMD5455)
- 2000: Out Front (Landmark Records/HD0041)
- 2000: Day By Day (Cathedral Records)
- 2004: This Is George Younce (George Younce Music)
- 2005: A Tribute To George Younce (Gaither Music Group/SHD2643)
- ????: Poetic Reflections (George Younce Music)

== Songs authored ==
(Partial List)

- Better Days
- Glory Hallelujah I'm On My Way
- He Is The Dearest Friend
- He Is The Great I Am
- He Made A Rainbow Of My Tears
- I Know He's Mine
- If I Can Just Hold Out
- It's Alright
- Jesus Can Make A Way
- Jesus Christ Solid Rock
- Jesus Is A Coming Back
- Little Deeds
- My Lord
- No Disappointments In Heaven
- Row Your Boat
- Shine On For Jesus
- So Dearly
- So I Love Him Dearly
- Take His Hand
- Thanks For Loving Me
- The Laughing Song
- Then I Found Jesus
- There'll Be No Peace Till Jesus Comes Again
- What Are You Going To Leave
- When I Get Home
- When The First Drop Of Blood Fell From The Cross
- Yesterday
- You Ain't Heard Nothing Yet

== Literature ==
- Glen Payne, George Younce, Ace Collins, The Cathedrals: The Story of America's Best-Loved Gospel Quartet, 2000
