= Milton Smith =

American computer security application developer, researcher, and writer

- Other name: @spoofzu
- Citizenship: American
- Known for: Computer security
- Scientific career
- Fields: Computer security
- Workplaces: Oracle; Yahoo

Milton Smith is an American computer security application developer, researcher, and writer. Smith is best known for his role leading Java platform security at Oracle during a period of high-profile security incidents in the fall of 2012. Due to the climate around Java security, in 2013 Smith was invited to present by Black Hat leadership in a closed session under Non-Disclosure Agreement to top industry leaders. In the same year Smith established the first ever full security track at a software developers conference, JavaOne, Oracle's premier conference for Java software developers in San Francisco, California(USA).

== Organizations ==
=== Oracle ===
Smith continues as a principal security analyst at Oracle working strategically across company business units. Smith is an active collaborator in industry developing open source security tools for researchers as well as participating in security conference events and organizing them. During this period Smith was Chief Technical Editor on an application security book project with colleges.

=== Yahoo ===
Prior to Oracle around June 2011, Smith was leading security for the User Data Analytics(UDA) business unit at Yahoo and developed innovative security controls to secure Yahoo's click stream revenues. Smith also lead Yahoo's Enterprise Security Triage Program for monitoring enterprise vulnerabilities and tracking remediation activities.

=== Open Web Application Security Project (OWASP) ===
OWASP is one of the largest non-profit organizations of security practitioners in the world. On March 12, 2015 Smith developed DeepViolet a TLS/SSL scanning API researchers use to extend TLS/SSL scanning to their own projects. Today DeepViolet is an OWASP Incubator project. Smith is also a leader on the OWASP Security Logging API Project, an open source project extending important security features to applications that use popular logging platforms like log4j and logback.
