= Bobby Clark (tenor) =

American singer

- Died: May 22, 2014
- Genres: Christian, Southern gospel, country, opera

Bobby Clark (died May 22, 2014) was the original tenor vocalist with the Cathedral Quartet from 1963 through 1967.

He was also a member of the Dixie Echoes, Deep South Quartet, The Weatherfords, The Oak Ridge Quartet, The Rangers, and the Men of Music. He appeared with the Rex Humbard National Television Ministry for eight years from the Cathedral of Tomorrow Church in Akron, Ohio. Bobby Clark recorded many long-play albums and CDs of gospel music. Outside of gospel, he had a contract with the Swope Park Musical Lyric Theatre in Kansas City, Missouri. Clark studied on a full-pay scholarship at the Cleveland Institute of Music in Cleveland, Ohio. His teacher was the renown Metropolitan operatic soprano, Elenore Steber. Clark sang with the Cleveland Symphony Orchestra in operatic excerpts under the conductorship of George Szell. He appeared in numerous roles with the Orlando Opera Company for five years while pastoring an Independent Baptist Church in Winter Springs, Florida. Bobby Clark was active in the U.S. for selective singing concerts.

He was a Baptist pastor from 1974-1989. For at least some of this time, he was the pastor of the First Baptist Church in Winter Springs, Florida.

Clark's voice has contributed to a number of country music recordings. Country artists with which Clark has worked include Marty Robbins, Jimmy Dean, and Hank Snow.

Bobby Clark died on May 22, 2014.

== Men Of Music Members ==
1995-1996	1996-1998	1998-2002
Bobby Clark – tenor; Jim Wesson – lead; Cleon Yates – baritone; Chris West – bass; Buddy Burton – piano, vocals	Bobby Clark – tenor; Jim Wesson – lead; Cleon Yates – baritone; Mike Bullock – bass; Buddy Burton – piano, vocals	Rick Solomon – tenor; Ralph Greene – lead; Cleon Yates – baritone; Mike Bullock – bass; Buddy Burton – piano, vocals
2002-2007	2007-2009	2009–present
Steve Warren – tenor; Ralph Greene – lead; Chris Smith – baritone; Mike Bullock – bass; Buddy Burton – piano, vocals	disbanded	Greg Colburn – tenor; Rodney Tyson – lead; Tyler Hudson – baritone
