= Henry Slaughter =

American pianist, singer, and songwriter (1927–2020)

- Born: Henry Thaxton Slaughter; January 9, 1927; Roxboro, North Carolina, U.S.
- Died: November 13, 2020 (aged 93) Nashville, Tennessee, U.S.
- Genres: Southern gospel
- Occupations: pianist, singer, songwriter

Henry Thaxton Slaughter (January 9, 1927 – November 13, 2020) was an American Southern gospel pianist and singer-songwriter. He won five Dove Awards, and was inducted into the Gospel Music Hall of Fame.

Since the 1940s, he worked with such memorable groups as the Stamps-Ozark Quartet, The Weatherford Quartet (1958–61), The Imperials (1964–66), and since the 1970s as Henry and Hazel Slaughter, including numerous appearances with Bill Gaither, the Gaither Praise Gatherings, and the Gaither Homecoming series.

== Biography ==
Slaughter was born on a tobacco farm near Roxboro, North Carolina, to parents Moses "Chummie" and Lila Slaughter. At the age of seven Slaughter was able to take piano lessons. Until then, he had health issues, including a heart murmur and scarlet fever. After graduating from high school with honors, he attended the Stamps-Baxter School of Music in Chattanooga, Tennessee. After a few months there, he was called to join the Army in World War II.

In the 1940s, soon after being released from the Army, he was asked to join the Ozark Quartet as a singer. Six months later, he became the piano player for the group.

Along the way, he wrote numerous songs that are considered gospel classics, including "What a Precious Friend is He," "Lonely Mile", "If The Lord Wasn't Walking By My Side" (recorded by Elvis Presley, on How Great Thou Art), and "I've Never Loved Him Better Than Today." In 1965, the Imperials released a full album of his songs, called Slaughter Writes - Imperials Sing.

=== Personal life ===
Slaughter married Hazel Myers in Laurel, Mississippi, on December 22, 1952. He and Hazel lived in Tennessee. He continued to write his internationally acclaimed "I Remember" column for MyBestYears.com, featuring precious memories of the people and places during the past seven decades on the road as one of Gospel music's premier keyboard artists.

Henry Slaughter is a cousin of Enos Slaughter, St. Louis Cardinals baseball player and member of MLB Hall Of Fame.

Slaughter died from complications of COVID-19 on November 13, 2020, at the age of 93.

== Book ==
His autobiography, In Search of the Pearl of Great Price ISBN 1453894241, written with Darryl Hicks, was published in 1980.

== Awards and honors ==
- 1996: Inducted into the Southern Gospel Piano Roll of Honor
- 1973–77: GMA Dove Award for Instrumentalist of the Year
- 2006: Inducted into Southern Gospel Music Association's Hall Of Fame
