= The Perrys =

Southern gospel quartet

- Also known as: The Singing Perrys
- Origin: Dawsonville, Georgia, U.S.
- Genre: Southern gospel
- Years active: 1970–present
- Label: StowTown
- Members: Libbi Perry Stuffle 1970-Present; Jared Stuffle 2005-2013; 2014-Present; Dayton Gay 2023-Present; Jason Gordon 2023-Present
- Website: Official Website

The Perrys are a Southern gospel quartet based in Hendersonville, Tennessee.

== History ==
The group was formed on December 25, 1970 by siblings Randy, Debbie, and Libbi Perry, in Georgia. In the mid-1980s, the group signed with former Happy Goodman Family pianist Eddie Crook on his Morning Star Records label. The group was soon joined by bass singer Tracy Stuffle, whom Libbi married shortly thereafter. Debbie left the group to focus on her family and was replaced by Denise Helton.

In 1994, after the release of their album Grace, Randy Perry left the group to concentrate on evangelism and Denise Helton also left the group to pursue other ventures. Band member Kent Barrett left to become a pastor. Nicole Watts and Barry Scott came in to fill these spots. Scott soon left the group and was replaced by Mike Bowling, a former member of the New Hinsons. In 1997, the group transitioned to Daywind Records, owned by Dottie Leonard Miller. They also signed an exclusive booking agreement with Harper and Associates. Their first album with Daywind, Crossings, included their first two #1 songs on the Singing News charts, "Not Even a Stone" and "By Faith I Can Touch Him Now".

Bowling left to join The Crabb Family and pursue a solo career, and Nicole Watts married and left the group shortly after his departure. David Hill joined the Perrys and held the lead position for approximately nine months. His only album with the group was, "Absolutely, Positively, Live!", which included the #1 hit, "Praise God, It's Settled, I'm Saved". Loren Harris, formerly of the Wilburns, took the lead position shortly afterward. The group decided to not fill the soprano position and instead hired baritone Curt Davis. It was during this time that the Perrys had their fourth #1 song, "I Rest My Case at the Cross".

In August 2003, Curt Davis resigned from the Perrys. Joseph Habedank replaced Davis. After pianist Justin Ellis left to perform with the Crabb Family, the Perrys hired Matthew Holt as the group's pianist in September 2004 at the National Quartet Convention. It was around this time that the Perrys had their fifth #1 song, "I Wish I Could Have Been There".

The Perrys were awarded Singing News Fan Awards for the 2004, 2005, and 2006 Mixed Quartet of the Year. The group received Harmony Honors Awards for Favorite Album of the Year (This Is the Day) and Favorite Song of the Year (I Wish I Could Have Been There). Libbi Perry Stuffle was awarded Singing News Fan Awards in 2005 for Female Vocalist and Alto Singer of the Year and in 2006 for Alto Singer of the Year. The Perrys were also awarded the Singing News Fan Award for Album of the Year in 2006 for their album Remembering the Happy Goodmans.

In 2006, lead vocalist Loren Harris resigned to spend more time with his family. Joseph Habedank moved to the lead position and Nick Trammell filled the baritone position. The first recording, Look No Further, under the new lineup was released in September 2007 at the National Quartet Convention. Nick Trammell received the Horizon Individual award from Singing News Fans for 2007. In July 2008, Matthew Holt announced his departure. Bryan Elliott joined the Perrys as pianist in August 2008.

It was announced on February 24, 2009 that Nick Trammell was departing from the group. Former audio engineer and Steeles member Troy Peach replaced Trammell. After Peach joined, the group began work on a new album for Daywind Records. At the 2009 National Quartet Convention, Libbi Perry Stuffle and Joseph Habedank were voted Favorite Alto and Favorite Young Artist respectively in the 2009 Singing News Fan Awards. The group's received two GMA Dove Awards nominations for Southern Gospel Recorded Album and Southern Gospel Recorded Song ("If You Knew Him"). The group released a second single, "Did I Mention", in early 2010. The song debuted on the March 2010 Singing News Charts at #47 and made it to #1 in July 2010. The group received eleven Top 5 nominations in the 2010 Singing News Fan Awards for Favorite Artist, Mixed Group, Male Vocalist, Female Vocalist, Horizon Individual, Young Artist, Alto, Lead, Songwriter, Album, and Song.

After the National Quartet Convention in 2010, pianist Bryan Elliott announced he would be departing to play for Gold City. In mid-October 2010, it was announced that Troy Peach would be leaving the group and the baritone spot would be filled by Bryan Walker. Walker announced his departure on October 15, 2014. He was replaced by the returning Troy Peach.

Bass singer Tracy Stuffle died on Sunday February 4, 2018 after suffering a stroke in 2013.

== Discography ==
- Songs of Power (1986)
- Tradition (1987)
- God's Little People (1988)
- The Best Four You (1989)
- Royal Descendants (1991)
- Going On (1992)
- Grace (1993)
- Full Circle (1994)
- Crossings (1997)
- Come To The Fountain (1998)
- Absolutely Positively Live (2000)
- Changed Forever (2001)
- Hits & Hymns Volume I (2002)
- Hits & Hymns Volume II (2002)
- This Is The Day (2003)
- Life Of Love (2004)
- Remembering The Happy Goodmans (2005)
- Come Thirsty (2006)
- Look No Further (2007)
- Almost Morning (2009)
- Blue Skies Coming (2011)
- Through the Night (2012)
- Into His Presence (2014)
- Sing (2015)
- Testament (2017)
- A Very Perry Christmas (2017)
- Keep Movin' Along (2019)
- John 3:16 (2022)
- Long, Long Road (2024)
