= Gold City =

American southern gospel quartet

- Also known as: Gold City Quartet
- Origin: Gadsden, Alabama, U.S.
- Genres: Southern gospel, contemporary christian
- Years active: 1980–present
- Labels: Heavy Weight; Nugget; Dawn; Heartwarming; Riversong; Crystal; Daywind; New Haven; Cathedral
- Members: Chris Jenkins; Josh Feemster; Daniel Riley; Jeff Chapman; Terry Wooten
- Website: goldcityministries.com

Gold City is an American southern gospel quartet based in Gadsden, Alabama. Formed in 1980, the group was one of the most successful quartets through the 1980s and 1990s, charting ten number one hits in Singing News magazine and being host to many icons in the Christian music industry, including Brian Free, Ivan Parker, Mark Trammell, Mike LeFevre, and Tim Riley.

== History ==
=== 1980s ===
Gold City was originally known as The Christianairs, based in Mississippi. The Alabama-based Christian group was renamed Gold City in Dahlonega, Georgia at midnight on New Year’s Day in 1980, composed of tenor Bob Oliver, lead Jerry Ritchie, baritone Ken Trussell, and bass Dallas Gilliland. Bass Tim Riley replaced Gilliland as the permanent bass singer in July of that same year. The group appeared on the main stage of the National Quartet Convention in October 1981. Pianist Garry Jones joined the group one month prior to the convention. In 1982, tenor Brian Free came on board and lead Ivan Parker joined in 1983. This group of men formed a consistent core that remained together until the end of 1993. Original owner Floyd Beck died in 1984, resulting in the group ownership being shared equally by Tim Riley, Ivan Parker, Garry Jones and Brian Free. During this transition, the group relocated to Gadsden, Alabama. Jeff Hullender joined the group in 1984 as bass guitar player. Mike LeFevre joined in 1985 to sing the baritone part, replacing Jerry Ritchie.

=== 1990s ===
Steve Lacey took over for LeFevre in 1992. After the departure of Free and Parker in 1993, Lacey switched to lead while Mark Trammell became baritone and Jay Parrack was named the new tenor. Lacey left to join the Kingdom Heirs the following year. David Hill became lead singer for a while; his departure led to the next consistent lineup for the group, which included Jonathan Wilburn singing lead, Mark Trammell singing baritone, and Jay Parrack as tenor with Riley at bass from 1996 until 2002. Over this period, the group developed a style that relied on heavy brass arrangements for their more driving songs.

=== 2000s ===
Trammell left the group in 2002 to form the Mark Trammell Trio. In 2004, the group saw the departure of Parrack at tenor in addition to the retirement of Tim Riley after 24 years. Former Brian Free & Assurance bass singer Bill Lawrence replaced him as bass, while Riley's sons, drummer Doug and baritone Daniel, took over management of the group until Doug Riley died in an automobile accident in early 2006. By this point, the full Gold City band had been retired and replaced with accompanying tracks.

In March 2006, bass singer Bill Lawrence left the group. Tim filled in for several months while the search for a replacement was underway. Aaron McCune, who was bass singer with the Palmetto State Quartet at the time, joined Gold City in May 2006.

In February 2007, it was announced that the group had returned to The Beckie Simmons Agency (from The Harper Agency). Beckie Simmons, while at Century II and her own agency, has handled the quartet's bookings for the majority of its existence.

In March 2008, lead singer Jonathan Wilburn left the group. Bruce Taliaferro, a Gadsden native who had filled in for Wilburn and Daniel Riley in the past, stepped in to fill the empty position. Gold City released their first recording with Taliaferro in July 2008. Also, August 2008 saw the Band of Gold return to the scene on a limited basis. The band consisted of pianist Josh Simpson, drummer Kevin Albertson, bass guitarist Taylor Barnes, and lead guitarist Daniel Addison.

On April 28, 2009, tenor, Steve Ladd, announced that he would be leaving Gold City. On June 17, 2009, it was announced that Chris Cooper would fill the tenor position. It was announced in July 2009 that Josh Simpson would be leaving Gold City in August to go to college. His temporary replacement was Curtis Broadway who played on Band of Gold dates. Gold City Bus driver Jim Korn filled in on keys after the Band of Gold quit traveling with the group. It was announced on August 11. 2009 that Aaron McCune had departed Gold City and a replacement was being sought.

Later in December, it was announced that Chris Cooper had left Gold City. A replacement was found by the end of Christmas break. Over the Christmas break, it was announced that former Legacy Five tenor Josh Cobb would join the group, and former Ernie Haase & Signature Sound pianist Roy Webb would join as the pianist. It was also announced that Tim Riley officially returned to Gold City.

=== 2010s to present ===
Later in 2010, Roy Webb opted to leave the group to fully pursue a solo career. Josh Simpson filled in on the piano while a new pianist was found. After the National Quartet Convention, it was announced that Perry's pianist, Bryan Elliott, would fill the piano bench. Months later, tenor singer, Josh Cobb was released from the group for logistical reasons. On October 29, Brent Mitchell was announced as tenor, to start officially on November 11, 2010. Bruce Taliaferro announced his resignation the next month on December 18, 2010. Tim Riley stepped down as bass again in 2016 when the quartet found Chris West.

On January 28, 2020, Bruce Taliaferro announced his return to the group, after the resignation of lead singer Scott Brand. Taliaferro began singing with the group on February 21. On January 11, 2022, Taliaferro announced his second resignation from the group, effective immediately until his replacement by Gadsden native Cole Watson. Watson and seven year tenor Thomas Nalley were released by the quartet nine months later. In the fall of 2022, Gold City announced the third return of Bruce Taliaferro. On the same night he was re-introduced, they also announced Former Kingsmen Quartet tenor Chris Jenkins as their new tenor singer. Chris West departed the group in January 2023 and Jeff Chapman of the Kingdom Heirs was announced to be their full-time bass singer starting on April 20 after filling in at multiple shows.

On August 15, 2023, Josh Feemster replaced Taliaferro as the lead singer for Gold City after he departed the group earlier that month. On April 27, 2025 former pianist Garry Jones died aged 62 after a brief battle with metastatic cancer.

== Members (past and present) ==
=== Line-ups ===
January 1980 (Under the Name "Gold City Quartet")	May 1980	July 1980–1981
Bob Oliver – tenor; Jerry Ritchie – lead; Ken Trussell – baritone; Dallas Gilliland – bass; Larry Goodard – piano; Cary Kirk – bass guitar; Wayne Hussey – drums	Bob Oliver – tenor; Jerry Ritchie – lead; Ken Trussell – baritone; Harold McVey – bass; John Reinhardt Jr. – piano; Larry Goodard – bass guitar; Wayne Hussey – drums	Bob Oliver – tenor; Jerry Ritchie – lead; Ken Trussell – baritone; Tim Riley – bass; John Reinhardt Jr. – piano; Larry Goodard – bass guitar; David Holloway – guitars; Wayne Hussey – drums
1981–1982	1982–1983	1983
Bob Oliver – tenor; Jerry Ritchie – lead; Ken Trussell – baritone; Tim Riley – bass; Garry Jones – piano; Jeff Easter – bass guitar; David Holloway, Jerry Lloyd – guitars; John Noski – drums	Brian Free – tenor; Jerry Ritchie – lead; Ken Trussell – baritone; Tim Riley – bass; Garry Jones – piano; Ken Burnett – bass guitar; Jerry Lloyd – guitars; Olan Witt – drums	Brian Free – tenor; Bill Crittenton – lead; Jerry Ritchie – baritone; Tim Riley – bass; Garry Jones – piano; Ken Bennett – bass guitar; Jerry Lloyd – guitars; John Noski – drums
1983	1983–1984	1984
Brian Free – tenor; Ivan Parker – lead; Jerry Ritchie – baritone; Tim Riley – bass; Garry Jones – piano; Ken Bennett – bass guitar; Jerry Lloyd – guitars; John Noski – drums	Benny Blackburn – tenor; Ivan Parker – lead; Jerry Ritchie – baritone; Tim Riley – bass; Garry Jones – piano; Ken Bennett – bass guitar; Jerry Lloyd – guitars; John Noski – drums	Brian Free – tenor; Ivan Parker – lead; Jerry Ritchie – baritone; Tim Riley – bass; Garry Jones – piano; Ken Bennett – bass guitar; Daryll LaCroy, Kelly Black – guitars; Corbett Harper – drums
1984-1985	1985-1987 (Now simply known as "Gold City")	1987–1988
Brian Free – tenor; Ivan Parker – lead; Jerry Ritchie – baritone; Tim Riley – bass; Garry Jones – piano, producer; Jeff Hullender – bass guitar; Daryll LaCroy – guitars; John Noski –drums	Brian Free – tenor; Ivan Parker – lead; Mike Leferve – baritone; Tim Riley – bass; Garry Jones – piano, producer; Jeff Hullender – bass guitar; Daryll LaCroy, Jerry Lloyd – guitars; John Noski – drums	Brian Free – tenor; Ivan Parker – lead; Mike LeFerve – baritone; Tim Riley – bass; Garry Jones – piano, producer; Jeff Hullender – bass guitar; Daryll LaCroy – guitars
1989	1989–1992	1992–1994
Brian Free – tenor; Ivan Parker – lead; Mike LeFerve – baritone; Tim Riley – bass; Garry Jones – piano, producer; Barry Scott – bass guitar; Daryll LaCroy – guitars	Brian Free – tenor; Ivan Parker – lead; Mike LeFerve – baritone; Tim Riley – bass; Garry Jones – piano, producer; Mark Fain – bass guitar; David Creech – guitar; Doug Riley – drums	Brian Free – tenor; Ivan Parker – lead; Steve Lacey – baritone; Tim Riley – bass; Garry Jones – piano, producer; Mark Fain – bass guitar; Doug Riley – drums
1994	1994–1995	1995–1996
Jay Parrack – tenor; Steve Lacey – lead; Mark Trammell – baritone; Tim Riley – bass; Garry Jones – piano; Mark Fain – bass guitar; Doug Riley – drums	Jay Parrack – tenor; David Hill – lead; Mark Trammell – baritone; Tim Riley – bass; David Brooks – piano; Mark Fain – bass guitar; Doug Riley – drums	Jay Parrack – tenor; David Hill – lead; Mark Trammell – baritone; Tim Riley – bass; Shane Jenkins – piano; Adam Borden – bass guitar; Doug Riley – drums
1996–1997	1997	1997–1999
Jay Parrack – tenor; Jonathan Wilburn – lead; Mark Trammell – baritone; Tim Riley – bass; Randy Matthews – piano; Adam Borden – bass guitar; Doug Riley – drums	Jay Parrack – tenor; Jonathan Wilburn – lead; Mark Trammell – baritone; Tim Riley – bass; Byron Stewart – piano; Adam Borden – bass guitar; Doug Riley – drums	Jay Parrack – tenor; Jonathan Wilburn – lead; Mark Trammell – baritone; Tim Riley – bass; Tim Parton – piano; Adam Borden – bass guitar; Doug Riley – drums
2000–2002	2002-2004	2004
Jay Parrack – tenor; Jonathan Wilburn – lead; Mark Trammell – baritone; Tim Riley – bass; Channing Eleton – piano; Adam Borden – bass guitar; Doug Riley – drums	Jay Parrack – tenor; Jonathan Wilburn – lead; Daniel Riley – baritone; Tim Riley – bass; Channing Eleton – piano; Adam Borden – bass guitar; Doug Riley – drums	Steve Ladd – tenor; Jonathan Wilburn – lead; Daniel Riley – baritone; Tim Riley – bass; Channing Eleton – piano; Adam Borden – bass guitar; Doug Riley – drums
2004–2005	2005-2006	2006
Steve Ladd – tenor; Jonathan Wilburn – lead; Daniel Riley – baritone; Bill Laurence – bass; Channing Eleton – piano; Adam Borden – bass guitar; Doug Riley – drums	Steve Ladd – tenor; Jonathan Wilburn – lead; Daniel Riley – baritone; Bill Laurence – bass; Josh Simpson – piano	Steve Ladd – tenor; Jonathan Wilburn – lead; Daniel Riley – baritone; Tim Riley – bass; Josh Simpson – piano
2006–2008	2008-2009	2009
Steve Ladd – tenor; Jonathan Wilburn – lead; Daniel Riley – baritone; Aaron McCune – bass; Josh Simpson – piano	Steve Ladd – tenor; Bruce Taliaferro – lead; Daniel Riley – baritone; Aaron McCune – bass; Josh Simpson – piano; Taylor Barnes – bass guitar; Daniel Addison – guitars; Kevin Albertson – drums	Chris Cooper – tenor; Bruce Taliaferro – lead; Daniel Riley – baritone; Aaron McCune – bass; Curtis Broadway – piano
2009-2010	2010-2011	2011
Josh Cobb – tenor; Jonathan Wilburn – lead; Daniel Riley – baritone; Tim Riley – bass; Roy Webb – piano	Brent Mitchell – tenor; Bruce Taliaferro – lead; Daniel Riley – baritone; Tim Riley – bass; Bryan Elliott – piano	Brent Mitchell – tenor; Craig West – lead; Daniel Riley – baritone; Tim Riley – bass; Bryan Elliott – piano
2011–2013	2013-2014	2014–2015
Dan Keeton – tenor; Craig West – lead; Daniel Riley – baritone; Tim Riley – bass; Bryan Elliott – piano	Robert Fulton – tenor; Chip Pullen – lead; Daniel Riley – baritone; Tim Riley – bass; Bryan Elliott – piano	Robert Fulton – tenor; Chip Pullen – lead; Daniel Riley – baritone; Chris West – bass; Bryan Elliott – piano
2015–2016	2016-2018	2018-2020
Thomas Nalley – tenor; Chip Pullen – lead; Daniel Riley – baritone; Chris West – bass; Bryan Elliott – piano	Thomas Nalley – tenor; Scott Brand – lead; Daniel Riley – baritone; Chris West – bass; Bryan Elliott – piano	Thomas Nalley – tenor; Scott Brand – lead; Daniel Riley – baritone; Chris West – bass; G.W. Southard – piano
2020	2021-2022	2022
Thomas Nalley – tenor; Bruce Taliaferro – lead; Daniel Riley – baritone; Chris West – bass; G.W. Southard – piano	Thomas Nalley – tenor; Bruce Taliaferro – lead; Daniel Riley – baritone; Chris West – bass; Terry Wooten – piano; Russell Wise – bass guitar; Chris Williams – drums	Thomas Nalley – tenor; Cole Watson – lead; Daniel Riley – baritone; Chris West – bass; Terry Wooten – piano; Russell Wise – bass guitar; Chris Williams – drums
2022-2023	2023–present
Chris Jenkins – tenor; Bruce Taliaferro – lead; Daniel Riley – baritone; Chris West – bass; Terry Wooten – piano; Russell Wise – bass guitar; Chris Williams – drums	Chris Jenkins – tenor; Josh Feemster – lead; Daniel Riley – baritone; Jeff Chapman – bass; Terry Wooten – piano; Taylor Barnes – bass guitar; Joel Stapleton – drums

Sound engineer

- Daniel Riley (2000–2002)
- Doug Riley (2005-2006, his death)

Group owner

- Floyd Beck (1980–1984, his death)
- Tim Riley (1984–2004)
- Daniel Riley (2004–present)

== Discography ==
- 1981: First Day in Heaven
- 1981: We Believe
- 1981: Sing Golden Nuggets
- 1981: Songs of Days Gone By
- 1982: I've Got a Feeling
- 1982: Gold City: Live
- 1983: I Think I’ll Read It Again
- 1983: Hymns Sung by The Gold City Quartet
- 1983: Higher than the Moon
- 1984: Walking with Jesus
- 1984: Walk On
- 1985: Sing with the Angels
- 1986: Double Take: Live
- 1986: Top Hits Volume 1
- 1986: Top Hits Volume 2
- 1986: Your Favorite Hymns
- 1987: Movin’ Up
- 1987: Favorites Volume 1
- 1987: Favorites Volume 2
- 1987: Favorites Volume 3
- 1988: Portrait
- 1988: Voices of Christmas
- 1989: Chartbreakers Volume 1
- 1989: Chartbreakers Volume 2
- 1989: Favorite Hymns Volume 2
- 1989: Goin’ Home
- 1990: Windows of Home
- 1990: Instrumentals Volume 1
- 1990: Chartbreakers Volume 3
- 1990: Indiana Live
- 1991: Super 70s Gospel Hits Vol. 1
- 1991: Super 70s Gospel Hits Vol. 2
- 1991: Super 70s Gospel Hits Vol. 3
- 1991: 10 Year Celebration
- 1991: Answer the Call
- 1992: Pillars of Faith
- 1993: Acapella Gold
- 1993: Requested Hymns Volume 1
- 1993: Requested Hymns Volume 2
- 1993: Requested Hymns Volume 3
- 1994: Renewed
- 1994: Lord Do It Again
- 1994: Classics
- 1995: Standing in the Gap
- 1996: Having Fun
- 1996: Preparing the Way
- 1997: What a Great Lifestyle
- 1997: Home for the Holidays
- 1998: Within the Rock
- 1999: Signed, Sealed, Delivered
- 2000: Amazing Grace: A Hymn Collection
- 2000: 20th Anniversary Celebration: Vol. 1
- 2000: 20th Anniversary Celebration: Vol. 2
- 2000: Are You Ready?
- 2001: Pressed Down, Shaken Together, Running Over
- 2002: Camp Meetin'
- 2003: Walk the Talk
- 2003: A Gold City Christmas
- 2004: First Class
- 2005: Heaven
- 2006: Revival
- 2008: Moment Of Truth
- 2010: A Collection of Favorites Volume 1, Version 1
- 2011: A Collection of Favorites Volume 1, Version 2
- 2011: Somebody's Coming
- 2014: Hymn Revival
- 2016: Authentic
- 2017: Treasures of Gold
- 2018: Hope for the Journey
- 2021: Once And For All - The Songs Of Doug Riley
- 2024: Right Now

Compilations

- 1986: Gold City Gold
- 1990: Favorites Volume 4
- 1992: Masters of the Gospel
- 1992: Kings Gold
- 1993: Kings Gold 2
- 1994: Kings Gold 3
- 1996: Kings Gold 4
- 1998: The Collection
- 2000: Through the Years
- 2002: The Very Best of Gold City
- 2003: 24K Gold
- 2006: Gold City — Their Best
- 2009: 7 Hits

Appearances on the Gaither Homecoming videos

- 1998: Singin' With The Saints: "I'm Not Giving Up"
- 1999: Sweet, Sweet Spirit: "God's Building A Church"
- 2001: What A Time: "In Time, On Time, Every Time"
