= National Quartet Convention =

Southern Gospel Music Event

The National Quartet Convention (NQC) is an annual gathering of Southern Gospel quartets and musicians. It is held at the LeConte Center in Pigeon Forge, Tennessee, United States.

== History ==
The first National Quartet Convention was held in 1957. J. D. Sumner, Cecil Blackwood and James Blackwood of The Blackwood Brothers were the founders of the famous National Quartet Convention formerly held in Memphis, Tennessee. The National Quartet Convention featured all the major gospel groups at a three-day event at the Ellis Auditorium in Memphis. After the first couple of years, the NQC was moved to Birmingham, Alabama in 1959 and Atlanta, Georgia in 1960. It returned to Memphis in 1961 and was drawing annual crowds of 20,000 by the mid-1960s. Sumner bought the convention in 1971 and moved it to Nashville, Tennessee in 1972, where it remained until 1993. After 1993, it was moved to a new home, Louisville, Kentucky. In 2014 the convention moved to Pigeon Forge, Tennessee, which is the home of the Southern Gospel Museum and Hall of Fame.

== Events ==
Over the years, the National Quartet Convention grew from three days of concerts to a six-day multi-purpose event. A main attraction is the exhibit hall with approximately 500 booths where artists, record labels, CD duplication plants, media entities, booking agents, Christian bookstores, and other industry related organizations display their products and offer their services. The week is largely attended by the older generation but lately due to the popularity of groups such as the Booth Brothers, Ernie Haase & Signature Sound, Legacy Five, The Collingsworth Family and the Gaither Vocal Band, the fans are becoming younger. Fans meet their favorite artists in the exhibit area.

A concert is held each evening in the LeConte Center at Pigeon Forge, typically approaches sellout numbers for the concerts. These concerts years past ran for approximately six hours but in 2009 they have shortened the evening to five hours, 6 p.m. to 11 p.m. and feature non-stop music from the major Southern Gospel artists spaced at 10-20 minute intervals. The Singing News used to present the Fan Award on the Thursday night of the week but it was changed to Saturday night in 2009. Afternoons are devoted to showcases, some for new talent and others for conceptual events. For example, a couple of popular showcases have been Mike Speck's "Choral Music Extravaganza." and "Glorious Piano Extravaganza" featuring the best in southern gospel music piano players. These are usually the highlights of the afternoons. There is a talent competition during the week as well.

In addition to the events for the fans, industry members routinely schedule meetings and even recording sessions to coincide with the convention. Groups needing to replace a member make new contacts at NQC and sometimes conduct auditions during the week. Various business deals are made or renegotiated. Hoping to gain exposure, up and coming artists schedule showcases at nearby hotels. Record labels court radio and media by feeding them meals, taking them on riverboat cruises and facilitating access for interviews with the artists.

In the late 1990s, the convention added three additional events designed to take the Southern Gospel convention experience to regions distant from Louisville. These new events were the Great Western Convention in Fresno, California; the Canadian Quartet Convention in Red Deer, Alberta, Canada; and the Central Canada Gospel Quartet Convention in Hamilton, Ontario, Canada. Within a few years, though, they had sold or abandoned those events in favor of focusing on the main event in Louisville.

== Noteworthy events at National Quartet Conventions ==
1999: Glen Payne made his final public performance via telephone from his hospital room at Vanderbilt Hospital in Nashville, Tennessee. He performed "I Won't Have to Cross Jordan Alone" at the request of George Younce, his singing partner from The Cathedral Quartet. Glen died one month later.

2005: Lauren Talley, Jason Crabb, and several other young Southern Gospel vocalists joined to record an album called "The Torch". "The Race", a song from the album, was voted #1 on some local charts in late 2005.

2007: Ivan Parker became the first soloist to take the Convention stage in 25 years.

2013: Tracy Stuffle of The Perrys joined his wife Libbi Perry-Stuffle on stage via FaceTime on her iPhone. Tracey had been unable to attend in person following a stroke suffered January 21, 2013. In a pre-recorded video message he stated he planned to attend the 2014 NQC in Pigeon Forge, Tennessee.

2013: Brazilian Christian group Quarteto Gileade, based in Rio Verde, Goiás, sang Handel's Hallelujah Chorus in Portuguese, becoming the first non-American group to perform at the main stage of the NQC. Many foreign groups have attended the convention over the years, some also sang in the showcase afternoons, but none had made it to the main stage until then. In the following year, they performed again at the main stage, singing Gold City's "I Get Down" in English with some verses in Portuguese, being joined after by Gold City themselves.
