= Steven Curtis Chapman discography =

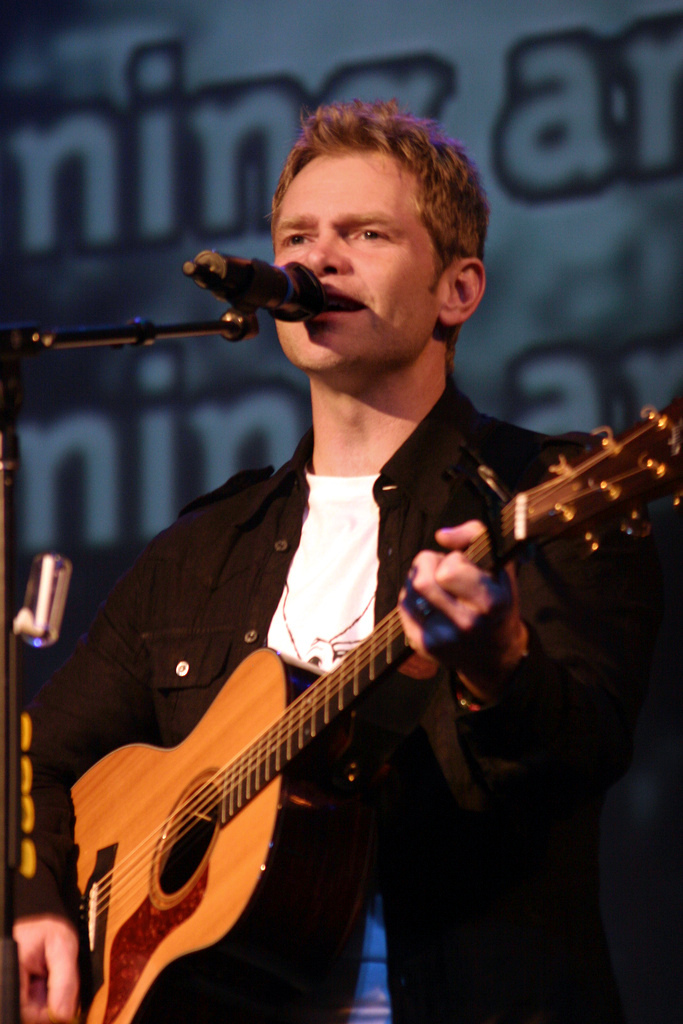
- Steven Curtis Chapman performing in concert
- Studio albums: 19
- Extended plays: 1
- Live albums: 2
- Compilation albums: 3
- Singles: 82
- Video albums: 3
- Holiday albums: 4

American contemporary Christian singer-songwriter Steven Curtis Chapman has released 19 studio albums and 82 singles, in addition to 4 holiday albums, 3 compilation albums, and 3 video releases. He has sold over 11 million albums, and 10 of his albums have been certified gold or platinum by the Recording Industry Association of America (RIAA).

Chapman's first album, First Hand (1987), was released on Sparrow Records; although the album did not chart, three of its singles reached the top ten on the CCM Update Christian radio charts. Real Life Conversations (1988) became his first album to appear on the Billboard Christian Albums chart, and More to This Life (1989) was his first top ten album on the Christian Albums chart, also yielding four No. 1 singles on the CCM Update Adult Contemporary chart; it was certified gold by the RIAA in 2002, signifying sales of over 500,000 copies in the United States.

Chapman would release five more studio albums in the 1990s, all of which reached the No. 1 position on the Christian Albums chart. For the Sake of the Call (1990), The Great Adventure (1992), and Signs of Life (1996) achieved gold certifications, while Heaven in the Real World (1994) and Speechless (1999) were certified platinum, signifying sales of over one million copies in the United States. He also recorded two other gold albums in the 1990s: the Christmas album The Music of Christmas (1995) and the compilation album Greatest Hits (1997). Chapman recorded 22 No. 1 singles on the Adult Contemporary chart in the 1990s, with "The Great Adventure" ranking as the No. 1 single on the 1990s decade-end Adult Contemporary chart.

Chapman's next two albums, Declaration (2001) and All About Love (2003), were his highest-charting albums on the Billboard 200, peaking at No. 14 and 12, respectively; they were both certified gold by the RIAA. In addition to All About Love, All Things New (2004), This Moment (2007), and Beauty Will Rise (2009) all reached the No. 1 position on the Christian Albums chart. He left Sparrow Records in 2012 and moved to Reunion Records, where he released two studio albums, The Glorious Unfolding (2014) and Worship and Believe (2016), as well as the Christmas album Joy (2012). He has also released two bluegrass albums through Cracker Barrel, with both charting at No. 1 on the Billboard Bluegrass Albums chart.

== Albums ==
=== Studio albums ===
List of studio albums, with chart positions and certifications
| Title | Album details | Peak chart positions | | Certifications |
| Title | Album details | US | US Christ. | Certifications |
|---|---|---|---|---|
| First Hand | Released: June 15, 1987; Label: Sparrow; Format: CD, cassette, digital download, LP | — | — | |
| Real Life Conversations | Released: April 1, 1988; Label: Sparrow; Format: CD, cassette, digital download, LP | — | 19 | |
| More to This Life | Released: October 5, 1989; Label: Sparrow; Format: CD, cassette, digital download | — | 2 | RIAA: Gold |
| For the Sake of the Call | Released: December 13, 1990; Label: Sparrow; Format: CD, cassette, digital download | — | 1 | RIAA: Gold |
| The Great Adventure | Released: June 19, 1992; Label: Sparrow; Format: CD, cassette, digital download | — | 1 | RIAA: Gold |
| Heaven in the Real World | Released: July 5, 1994; Label: Sparrow; Format: CD, cassette, digital download | 195 | 1 | RIAA: Platinum |
| Signs of Life | Released: August 22, 1996; Label: Sparrow; Format: CD, cassette, digital download | 20 | 1 | RIAA: Gold |
| Speechless | Released: June 3, 1999; Label: Sparrow; Format: CD, cassette, digital download | 31 | 1 | RIAA: Platinum |
| Declaration | Released: September 13, 2001; Label: Sparrow; Format: CD, digital download | 14 | 2 | RIAA: Gold |
| All About Love | Released: January 16, 2003; Label: Sparrow; Format: CD, digital download | 12 | 1 | RIAA: Gold |
| All Things New | Released: September 9, 2004; Label: Sparrow; Format: CD, digital download | 22 | 1 | |
| This Moment | Released: October 23, 2007; Label: Sparrow; Format: CD, digital download | 47 | 1 | |
| Beauty Will Rise | Released: October 30, 2009; Label: Sparrow; Format: CD, digital download | 27 | 1 | |
| Re-creation | Released: August 5, 2011; Label: Sparrow; Format: CD, digital download | 43 | 2 | |
| Deep Roots | Released: March 11, 2013; Label: Cracker Barrel, Steven Curtis Chapman; Format: CD, digital download | 68 | 2 | |
| The Glorious Unfolding | Released: September 27, 2013; Label: Reunion; Format: CD, digital download | 27 | 2 | |
| Worship and Believe | Released: March 4, 2016; Label: Reunion; Format: CD, digital download | 87 | 4 | |
| Deeper Roots: Where the Bluegrass Grows | Released: March 22, 2019; Label: Cracker Barrel, Steven Curtis Chapman; Format: CD, digital download | — (Note: Deeper Roots: Where The Bluegrass Grows did not appear on the Billboard 200, but peaked at No. 58 on the component Top Album Sales chart.) | 12 | |
| Still | Released: October 14, 2022; Label: Provident; Format: CD, digital download | — | 4 | |
"—" denotes releases that did not chart

=== Compilation albums ===
List of compilation albums, with chart positions and certifications
| Title | Album details | Peak chart positions | | Certifications |
| Title | Album details | US | US Christ. | Certifications |
|---|---|---|---|---|
| Greatest Hits | Released: October 9, 1997; Label: Sparrow; Format: CD, digital download | 85 | 4 | RIAA: Gold |
| #1's, Vol. 1 | Released: March 30, 2012; Label: Sparrow; Format: CD, digital download | — | 19 | |
| #1's, Vol. 2 | Released: February 8, 2013; Label: Sparrow; Format: CD, digital download | — | 43 | |
"—" denotes releases that did not chart

=== Extended plays ===
List of extended plays, with chart positions and certifications
| Title | Album details | Peak chart positions | |
| Title | Album details | US | US Christ. |
|---|---|---|---|
| Safe in the Arms (EP) | Released: September 17, 2010; Label: Sparrow; Format: Digital download | — | 30 |
"—" denotes releases that did not chart

=== Christmas albums ===
List of Christmas albums, with chart positions and certifications
| Title | Album details | Peak chart positions | | | Certifications |
| Title | Album details | US | US Christ. | US Holiday | Certifications |
|---|---|---|---|---|---|
| The Music of Christmas | Released: September 14, 1995; Label: Sparrow; Format: CD, cassette, digital download | 61 | 2 | 7 | RIAA: Gold |
| All I Really Want for Christmas | Released: September 27, 2005; Label: Sparrow; Format: CD, digital download | 90 | 7 | 2 | |
| Joy | Released: October 12, 2012; Label: Reunion; Format: CD, digital download, LP | 185 | 7 | 13 | |
| Christmas Hymns | Released: October 9, 2015; Label: Sparrow; Format: CD, digital download | — | 50 | — | |
"—" denotes releases that did not chart

=== Live albums ===
List of live albums, with chart positions and certifications
| Title | Album details | Peak chart positions | |
| Title | Album details | US | US Christ. |
|---|---|---|---|
| The Live Adventure | Released: September 13, 1993; Label: Sparrow; Format: CD, cassette, digital download, VHS | — | 2 |
"—" denotes releases that did not chart

=== Videos ===
List of video releases, with chart positions and certifications
| Title | Album details | Peak chart positions | |
| Title | Album details | US Video | US Christ |
|---|---|---|---|
| The Walk | Released: October 1, 1997; Label: Sparrow; Format: VHS | 2 | — |
| The Videos | Released: February 26, 2002; Label: Sparrow; Format: DVD, VHS | 16 | — |
| A Great Adventure: Live Solo Performances of Timeless Hits | Released: May 10, 2019; Label: Gaither Music Group; Format: CD, DVD, digital download | 1 | — (Note: A Great Adventure: Live Solo Performances of Timeless Hits did not appear on the Billboard Christian Albums chart, but peaked at No. 13 on the component Christian Album Sales chart.) |
"—" denotes releases that did not chart

== Singles ==
=== 1987–2000 ===
List of singles, with chart positions
| Title | Year | Peak chart positions | | Album |
| Title | Year | US Christ. AC | US Christ. CHR | Album |
|---|---|---|---|---|
| "Weak Days" | 1987 | 2 | 6 | First Hand |
| "Hiding Place" | 1987 | 6 | — | First Hand |
| "Tell Me" | 1987 | — | 14 | First Hand |
| "Run Away" | 1988 | 4 | 8 | First Hand |
| "His Eyes" | 1988 | 1 | 12 | Real Life Conversations |
| "Faithful Too" | 1988 | — | 14 | Real Life Conversations |
| "For Who He Really Is" | 1988 | 4 | 6 | Real Life Conversations |
| "My Turn Now" | 1989 | 1 | 3 | Real Life Conversations |
| "His Strength Is Perfect" | 1989 | 10 | — | Real Life Conversations |
| "More to This Life" | 1989 | 1 | 2 | More to This Life |
| "I Will Be Here" | 1990 | 1 | 10 | More to This Life |
| "Love You With My Life" | 1990 | 1 | 5 | More to This Life |
| "Treasure Island" | 1990 | 1 | 5 | More to This Life |
| "Waiting for Lightning" | 1990 | 6 | — | More to This Life |
| "For the Sake of the Call" | 1991 | 1 | 3 | For the Sake of the Call |
| "When You Are a Soldier" | 1991 | 12 | — | For the Sake of the Call |
| "No Better Place" | 1991 | 1 | 1 | For the Sake of the Call |
| "Busy Man" | 1991 | 1 | 3 | For the Sake of the Call |
| "What Kind of Joy" | 1991 | 1 | 11 | For the Sake of the Call |
| "You Know Better" | 1992 | 6 | 15 | For the Sake of the Call |
| "Real Life Medley" | 1992 | 10 | — | Non-album single |
| "The Great Adventure" | 1992 | 1 | 3 | The Great Adventure |
| "Where We Belong" | 1992 | 1 | 6 | The Great Adventure |
| "Go There With You" | 1993 | 2 | 19 | The Great Adventure |
| "That's Paradise" | 1993 | 3 | 3 | The Great Adventure |
| "Still Called Today" (featuring Bebe Winans) | 1993 | 1 | 20 | The Great Adventure |
| "Heaven in the Real World" | 1994 | 1 | 1 | Heaven in the Real World |
| "King of the Jungle" | 1994 | 1 | 1 | Heaven in the Real World |
| "Remember Your Chains" | 1994 | 20 | — | Heaven in the Real World |
| "Dancing with the Dinosaur" | 1995 | 3 | 1 | Heaven in the Real World |
| "The Mountain" | 1995 | 6 | — | Heaven in the Real World |
| "Heartbeat of Heaven" | 1995 | 11 | 19 | Heaven in the Real World |
| "Christmas is All in the Heart" | 1995 | 1 | — | The Music of Christmas |
| "Sometimes He Comes in the Clouds" | 1996 | 8 | — | My Utmost for His Highest |
| "Lord of the Dance" | 1996 | 2 | 2 | Signs of Life |
| "Signs of Life" | 1996 | 2 | 2 | Signs of Life |
| "Let Us Pray" | 1997 | 1 | 5 | Signs of Life |
| "Free" | 1997 | 1 | 6 | Signs of Life |
| "Not Home Yet" | 1997 | 1 | 9 | Greatest Hits |
| "I Will Not Go Quietly" | 1998 | 1 | 7 | Music from and Inspired by the Motion Picture The Apostle |
| "The Walk" | 1998 | 6 | — | Signs of Life |
| "Speechless" | 1999 | 1 | 2 | Speechless |
| "Dive" | 1999 | 1 | 1 | Speechless |
| "Fingerprints of God" | 1999 | 1 | — | Speechless |
| "Whatever" | 2000 | — | 3 | Speechless |
| "Great Expectations" | 2000 | 1 | — | Speechless |
| "I Do Believe" | 2000 | — | 3 | Speechless |
| "The Change" | 2000 | 1 | 4 | Speechless |
"—" denotes releases that did not chart

=== 2001–present ===
List of singles, with chart positions
| Title | Year | Peak chart positions | | | | Certifications | Album |
| Title | Year | US AC | US Christ. | US Christ. Airplay | US Christ. AC | Certifications | Album |
|---|---|---|---|---|---|---|---|
| "Live Out Loud" | 2001 | — | — (Note: "Live Out Loud" was released before the Billboard Christian Songs and Christian Airplay charts were created, but peaked at No. 1 on the Radio & Records Christian AC and CHR charts.) | | — (Note: "Live Out Loud" was released before the Billboard Christian AC Songs chart was created.) | | Declaration |
| "God Is God" | 2001 | — | — (Note: "God Is God" was released before the Billboard Christian Songs and Christian Airplay charts were created, but peaked at No. 1 on the Radio & Records Christian AC chart.) | | — (Note: "God Is God" was released before the Billboard Christian AC Songs chart was created.) | | Declaration |
| "See The Glory" | 2002 | — | — (Note: "See The Glory" was released before the Billboard Christian Songs and Christian Airplay charts were created, but peaked at No. 3 on the Radio & Records Christian CHR charts.) | | — (Note: "See The Glory" was released before the Billboard Christian AC Songs chart was created.) | | Declaration |
| "Magnificent Obsession" | 2002 | — | — (Note: "Magnificent Obsession" was released before the Billboard Christian Songs and Christian Airplay charts were created, but peaked at No. 1 on the Radio & Records Christian AC chart.) | | — (Note: "Magnificent Obsession" was released before the Billboard Christian AC Songs chart was created.) | | Declaration |
| "Jesus Is Life" | 2002 | — | — (Note: "Jesus Is Life" was released before the Billboard Christian Songs and Christian Airplay charts were created, but peaked at No. 21 on the Radio & Records Christian CHR chart.) | | — (Note: "Jesus Is Life" was released before the Billboard Christian AC Songs chart was created.) | | Declaration |
| "All About Love" | 2002 | — | — (Note: "All About Love" was released before the Billboard Christian Songs and Christian Airplay charts were created, but peaked at No. 1 on the Radio & Records Christian AC and CHR charts.) | | — (Note: "All About Love" was released before the Billboard Christian AC Songs chart was created.) | | All About Love |
| "How Do I Love Her" | 2003 | 27 | 7 | | 7 | | All About Love |
| "Moment Made for Worshipping" | 2003 | — | 9 | | 9 | | All About Love |
| "All Things New" | 2004 | — | 8 | | 8 | | All Things New |
| "Much of You" | 2004 | — | 5 | | 5 | | All Things New |
| "Believe Me Now" (w/ Mac Powell) | 2005 | — | 27 | | 27 | | All Things New |
| "Remembering You" | 2005 | 22 | 9 | | 7 | | Music Inspired by The Chronicles of Narnia: The Lion, the Witch and the Wardrobe |
| "All I Really Want For Christmas" | 2005 | 36 | 2 | | 2 | | All I Really Want for Christmas |
| "Miracle of the Moment" | 2007 | — | 4 | | 3 | | This Moment |
| "Cinderella" | 2008 | 23 | 4 | | 3 | RIAA: Platinum | This Moment |
| "Yours" | 2008 | — | 7 | | 3 | | This Moment |
| "Heaven is the Face" | 2009 | — | 7 | | 13 | | Beauty Will Rise |
| "Beauty Will Rise" | 2010 | — | 39 | | — | | Beauty Will Rise |
| "Do Everything" | 2011 | — | 3 | | 1 | | Re-creation |
| "Long Way Home" | 2012 | — | 15 | | 18 | | Re-creation |
| "Christmas Time Again" | 2012 | — | 1 | | 1 | | Joy |
| "Love Take Me Over" | 2013 | — | 4 | 3 | 3 | | The Glorious Unfolding |
| "Glorious Unfolding" | 2014 | — | 18 | 16 | — | | The Glorious Unfolding |
| "Something Beautiful" | 2015 | — | 19 | 14 | 14 | | The Glorious Unfolding |
| "Amen" | 2016 | — | 23 | 17 | 20 | | Worship and Believe |
| "One True God" | 2016 | — | 27 | 20 | 27 | | Worship and Believe |
| "More Than Conquerers" | 2017 | — | — | 33 | — | | Worship and Believe |
| "Remember to Remember" | 2018 | — | — | 41 | — | | non-album single |
| "Don't Lose Heart" | 2022 | — | 10 | 3 | 1 | | Still |
| "Do It Again" | 2024 | — | — | 18 | 21 | | Non-album singles |
| "Speed of Love" | 2025 | — | — | — | — | | Non-album singles |
"—" denotes releases that did not chart

=== As featured artist ===
==== 1987–2000 ====
List of singles as featured artist, with chart positions
| Title | Year | Peak chart positions | | Album |
| Title | Year | US Christ. AC | US Christ. CHR | Album |
|---|---|---|---|---|
| "Listen to Our Hearts" (Geoff Moore and the Distance featuring Steven Curtis Chapman) | 1992 | 4 | — | A Friend Like U |
| "Faithful Friend" (Twila Paris featuring Steven Curtis Chapman) | 1996 | 4 | 22 | Where I Stand |
"—" denotes releases that did not chart

==== 2004–present ====
List of singles as featured artist, with chart positions
| Title | Year | Peak chart positions | | | Album |
| Title | Year | US Christ. | US Christ. Airplay | US Christ. AC | Album |
|---|---|---|---|---|---|
| "I See Love" (featuring MercyMe, Third Day, and Steven Curtis Chapman) | 2004 | 21 | | 25 | The Passion of the Christ: Songs |
| "By His Wounds" (featuring Mark Hall, Mac Powell, Brian Littrell, and Steven Curtis Chapman) | 2007 | 8 | | 8 | Glory Revealed |
| "Jesus, Firm Foundation" (featuring Mike Donehey, Mandisa, Mark Hall, and Steven Curtis Chapman) | 2013 | 41 | | — | Jesus, Firm Foundation: Hymns of Worship |
| "Wonderful" (Cain featuring Steven Curtis Chapman) | 2021 | 18 | 4 | 3 | Wonderful (EP) |
"—" denotes releases that did not chart

=== Other charting songs ===
List of songs, with chart positions
| Title | Year | Peak chart positions | Album |
| Title | Year | US Christ. | Album |
|---|---|---|---|
| "Go Tell it on the Mountain" | 2005 | 17 | All I Really Want for Christmas |
| "Do You Hear What I Hear?" | 2012 | 32 | Joy |
| "Let It Snow, Let It Snow, Let It Snow" | 2012 | 46 | Joy |
| "Joy to the World" | 2012 | 45 | Joy |
| "Warrior" | 2015 | 50 | War Room (Music From and Inspired by the Motion Picture) |
| "We Remember" | 2017 | 43 | non-album release |
| "The Great Adventure: 25th Anniversary Edition" (with Bart Millard) | 2017 | 47 | non-album release |
| "Together (We'll Get Through This)" (with Brad Paisley, Tasha Cobbs Leonard, Lauren Alaina) | 2020 | 36 | non-album release |
