= Greatest Hits (Steven Curtis Chapman album) =

Compilation album by Steven Curtis Chapman

Compilation album by Steven Curtis Chapman
- Released: October 21, 1997
- Studio: The Dugout and Seventeen Grand Studio (Nashville, Tennessee); Abbey Road Studios (London, England, UK)
- Genre: CCM
- Length: 66:07
- Label: Sparrow
- Producer: Brown Bannister; Steven Curtis Chapman; Phil Naish

Steven Curtis Chapman chronology
Signs of Life (1996)	Greatest Hits (1997)	Speechless (1999)

Professional ratings
Review scores
Source	Rating
AllMusic	4.5/5 stars

Greatest Hits is a compilation album by the contemporary Christian music singer Steven Curtis Chapman released on October 21, 1997, by Sparrow Records. The album was repackaged in 2008.

== Track listing ==
All tracks are written by Steven Curtis Chapman, except where noted.

No.	Title	Writer(s)	Original album	Length
1.	"Not Home Yet"		Previously unreleased	5:34
2.	"More to This Life"	Steven Curtis Chapman; Phil Naish	More to This Life (1989)	5:15
3.	"The Great Adventure"	Steven Curtis Chapman; Geoff Moore	The Great Adventure (1992)	4:30
4.	"That's Paradise"	Steven Curtis Chapman; Geoff Moore	The Great Adventure	5:02
5.	"His Eyes"	Steven Curtis Chapman; James Isaac Elliot	Real Life Conversations (1988)	3:36
6.	"For the Sake of the Call"		For the Sake of the Call (1990)	5:29
7.	"I Will Be Here"		More to This Life	4:27
8.	"I Am Found in You"		Previously unreleased	4:01
9.	"Heaven in the Real World"		Heaven in the Real World (1994)	4:13
10.	"No Better Place"	Steven Curtis Chapman; Phil Naish	For the Sake of the Call	3:49
11.	"Hiding Place"	Steven Curtis Chapman; Jerry Salley	First Hand (1987)	4:59
12.	"His Strength Is Perfect"	Steven Curtis Chapman; Jerry Salley	Real Life Conversations	4:37
13.	"Lord of the Dance" (Abbey Road Version)	Steven Curtis Chapman; Scotty Smith	Previously unreleased	5:14
14.	"The Walk" (Abbey Road Version)		Previously unreleased	5:21
Total length:				66:07

== Personnel ==
- Steven Curtis Chapman – lead vocals, backing vocals (1), guitars (1, 8, 13, 14)
- Scott Sheriff – Hammond B3 organ (1, 13, 14), backing vocals (1, 13, 14)
- Hardy Hemphill – acoustic piano (1, 13, 14), harmonica (14)
- Shane Keister – keyboards (8)
- Phil Madeira – Hammond B3 organ (8)
- Kenny Greenberg – guitars (1, 8)
- Randy Pearce – guitars (1, 13, 14), backing vocals (13, 14)
- Gordon Kennedy – guitars (8)
- Brent Barcus – guitars (13, 14)
- Adam Anders – bass (1, 8, 13, 14), backing vocals (13, 14)
- Leland Sklar – bass (8)
- Will Denton – drums (1, 8, 13, 14)
- Chris McHugh – drums (8)
- Chris Rodriguez – backing vocals (8)

== Production ==
- Dan Raines – executive producer
- Peter York – executive producer
- Brown Bannister – producer (1, 8, 13, 14)
- Steven Curtis Chapman – producer (1, 8, 9, 13, 14)
- Phil Naish – producer (2–7, 9–12)
- Steve Bishir – recording (1, 8, 13, 14), mixing (1, 8, 13, 14)
- Hank Nirider – assistant engineer (1, 8)
- Andrew Dudman – assistant engineer (13, 14)
- Steve Hall – mastering at Future Disc (Hollywood, California)
- Traci Sterling – production manager
- Jan Cook – art direction
- Joyce Revoir – art direction
- Kerosene Halo – design
- Christiév Carothers – creative director
- Robert Fleischauer – cover photography, inside photos
- Marc Hanauer – inside photos
- Olivia Rutherford – London photos
- Gino Tanabe – stylist
- Johnny Villanueva – grooming
