= Grammy Award for Best Pop/Contemporary Gospel Album =

Music award category

The Grammy Award for Best Pop/Contemporary Gospel Album was awarded from 1991 to 2011. From 1991 to 1993 it was awarded as Best Pop Gospel Album. According to the category description guide for the 52nd Grammy Awards, the award is reserved "For albums containing at least 51% playing time of newly recorded pop/contemporary gospel vocal tracks."

The award was discontinued in 2012 in a major overhaul of Grammy categories. From 2012, recordings in this category were shifted to the newly formed Best Contemporary Christian Music Album category.

Years reflect the year in which the Grammy Awards were presented, for works released in the previous year.

== Recipients ==
Years reflect the year in which the Grammy Awards were presented, for works released in the previous year.

Year^{[I]}	Performing artists	Work	Nominees	Ref.
1991	Sandi Patti	Another Time...Another Place	Steven Curtis Chapman – More to This Life; Phil Driscoll – Warriors; Michael W. Smith – Go West Young Man; First Call – God Is Good	
1992	Steven Curtis Chapman	For the Sake of the Call	Larnelle Harris – Larnelle Live; Marilyn McCoo – The Me Nobody Knows; Michael English – Michael English; Carman and Commissioned with the Christ Church Choir – Shakin' the House...Live	
1993	Steven Curtis Chapman	The Great Adventure	Susan Ashton – Angels of Mercy; Carman – Addicted to Jesus; Larnelle Harris – I Choose Joy; Mylon LeFevre – Faith, Hope and Love	
1994	Steven Curtis Chapman	The Live Adventure	Margaret Becker – Soul; Michael English – Hope; Sandi Patti – Le Voyage; Wayne Watson – A Beautiful Place	
1995	Andraé Crouch	Mercy	Gary Chapman – The Light Inside; Steven Curtis Chapman – Heaven in the Real World; Larnelle Harris – Beyond All the Limits; BeBe & CeCe Winans – First Christmas	
1996	Michael W. Smith	I'll Lead You Home	Steven Curtis Chapman – The Music of Christmas; Larnelle Harris – Unbelievable Love; Sandi Patty – Find It on the Wings; Various Artists – My Utmost for His Highest	
1997	Various Artists	Tribute: The Songs of Andraé Crouch	Gary Chapman – Shelter; Steven Curtis Chapman – Signs of Life; 4Him – The Message; Point of Grace – Life Love & Other Mysteries	
1998	Jars of Clay	Much Afraid	Anointed – Under The Influence; Gary Chapman – This Gift; Petra – Petra Praise 2: We Need Jesus; Vanessa Williams – Star Bright	
1999	Deniece Williams	This Is My Song	Carman – Mission 3:16; DC Talk – Supernatural; Point of Grace – Steady On; Michael W. Smith – Live the Life	
2000	Steven Curtis Chapman	Speechless	Anointed – Anointed; Andraé Crouch – The Gift of Christmas; Dukes of Dixieland – Gloryland; Various Artists – The Prince of Egypt (Nashville)	
2001	Jars of Clay	If I Left the Zoo	Avalon – Joy: A Christmas Collection; Crystal Lewis – Fearless; Michael W. Smith – This Is Your Time; Jaci Velasquez – Crystal Clear	
2002	CeCe Winans	CeCe Winans	Avalon – Oxygen; Steven Curtis Chapman – Declaration; Nicole C. Mullen – Talk About It; Michael W. Smith – Worship	
2003	Jars of Clay	The Eleventh Hour	Paul Colman Trio – New Map of the World; NewSong – The Christmas Shoes; Kathy Troccoli – The Heart of Me; True Vibe – See the Light	
2004	Michael W. Smith	Worship Again	Jars of Clay – Furthermore: From the Studio, From the Stage; Newsboys – Adoration: The Worship Album; Stacie Orrico – Stacie Orrico; Third Day – Offerings II: All I Have to Give	
2005	Steven Curtis Chapman	All Things New	Avalon – The Creed; Jars of Clay – Who We Are Instead; Nicole C. Mullen – Everyday People; Rain Song – Rising Son	
2006	Casting Crowns	Lifesong	Steven Curtis Chapman – All I Really Want for Christmas; Jars of Clay – Redemption Songs; Out of Eden – Hymns; Michael W. Smith – Healing Rain; Third Day – Live Wire	
2007	Third Day	Wherever You Are	Leeland – Sound of Melodies; MercyMe – Coming Up to Breathe; Chris Tomlin – See the Morning; Ayiesha Woods – Introducing Ayiesha Woods	
2008	Israel & New Breed	A Deeper Level	Casting Crowns – The Altar and the Door; Mandisa – True Beauty; Michael W. Smith – Stand; TobyMac – Portable Sounds	
2009	CeCe Winans	Thy Kingdom Come	Steven Curtis Chapman – This Moment; Brandon Heath – What If We; Leeland – Opposite Way; Chris Tomlin – Hello Love	
2010	Israel Houghton	The Power of One	Jeremy Camp – Speaking Louder Than Before; Jars Of Clay – The Long Fall Back to Earth; Leeland – Love Is on the Move; Mandisa – Freedom	
2011	Israel Houghton	Love God. Love People.	Steven Curtis Chapman – Beauty Will Rise; Sanctus Real – Pieces of a Real Heart; Ricky Skaggs – Mosaic; TobyMac – Tonight	

^{^[I]} Each year is linked to the article about the Grammy Awards held that year.

== See also ==
- Grammy Award for Best Contemporary Christian Music Album
- Grammy Award for Best Rock Gospel Album
- List of Grammy Award categories
