= Believe Me Now =

Believe Me Now may refer to:

- Believe Me Now?, 2024 album by Becky Hill
- "Believe Me Now", song by the Electric Light Orchestra on the album Out of the Blue
- "Believe Me Now", song by Steven Curtis Chapman on the album All Things New
