= Worship and Believe =

Studio album by Steven Curtis Chapman
- Released: March 4, 2016
- Genre: Worship, Christian pop
- Length: 72:28
- Label: Sony Music (Essential Worship, Reunion)
- Producer: Brent Milligan; Steven Curtis Chapman

Steven Curtis Chapman chronology
The Glorious Unfolding (2013)	Worship and Believe (2016)	Deeper Roots: Where the Bluegrass Grows (2019)

Worship and Believe is the seventeenth studio album by Steven Curtis Chapman. Sony Music, through both the Essential Worship and Reunion Records brands, released the album on March 4, 2016.

== Critical reception ==
Professional ratings
Review scores
Source	Rating
365 Days of Inspiring Media	4.5/5 stars
Alpha Omega News	A
CCM Magazine	4/5 stars
The Christian Beat	4.8/5
Cross Rhythms	9/10 squares
Jesus Freak Hideout	3/5 stars
Jesus Wired	95/100
New Release Today	5/5 stars
Today's Christian Entertainment	4.5/5 stars
Worship Leader	4/5 stars

Awarding the album four stars at CCM Magazine, Matt Conner states, "Worship And Believe definitely feels different than your typical Chapman release, but it’s his voice that keeps this album in familiar territory, even as the pop production and congregational feel bring in fresh elements...it's a welcome shift in career direction for Chapman and hopefully there's more to come." Jeremy Armstrong, rating the album four stars from Worship Leader, writes, "the result is powerful worship music for individual worship and some song options to unite congregations...As a shift from a focus on story stongs to vertical prayers, Worship and Believe represents Chapman's continual willingness to grow in artistry." Giving the album five stars for New Release Today, Phronsie Howell says, "Worship and Believe is Steven Curtis Chapman's debut in the worship genre, and it not only solidifies his place in the worship music world, it exemplifies what heartfelt worship is...Worship and Believe is powerful, genuine, heartfelt worship to the King of Kings who sustains us even in the midst of life's trials."

Reviewing the album for Charisma, Taylor Berglund writes, "Worship and Believe doesn't reinvent the wheel when it comes to modern worship, but Chapman's unique touch makes the album a worthwhile listen for fans of Christian music. Worship and Believe has plenty of highlights. Chapman may have taken 16 albums before creating his first worship album, but Worship and Believe was worth the wait." Jonathan Andre, indicating in a four and a half star review by 365 Days of Inspiring Media, describes, "Worship and Believe is yet another album full of poignancy and comforting words and Steven continues to present to us reasons why he still carries a mantle of one of CCM’s most prolific and sustainable songwriters of CCM history. Well done Steven Curtis Chapman for such a wonderful and rewarding album experience, one that will be enjoyed and cherished by myself in months, years and decades to come!" Signaling in a nine out of ten review from Cross Rhythms, Lins Honeyman writes, "this stunningly inspiring and poignant release."

Indicating in a 95 out of 100 review at Jesus Wired, Chelsea DeVries writes, "Worship and Believe is definitely a rock solid effort of worship from Steven Curtis Chapman...his ear for good music mixed with faith-filled songwriting has not grown tone deaf but instead has gotten better with time." Rating the album a 4.8 out of five by The Christian Beat, Sarah Baylor says, "this new album truly delivers with a collection of songs that strike to the heart and inspire...Steven Curtis Chapman shares deeply personal lyrics and creates powerful worship moments with his latest release." Lauren McLean, allotting the album a four and a half star rating from Today's Christian Entertainment, writes, "Worship and Believe is full of beautiful reminders of who we are to the Lord and why we are here." Signaling in a three star review at Jesus Freak Hideout, Mark Rice says, "With Worship and Believe, I think the big creative misstep for Chapman was attempting to release a project full of music designed for congregational/Sunday morning/church/communal/group worship (call it what you will), rather than making a worship project with less restrictive confines." Rob Snyder, grading the album an A for Alpha Omega News, says, "this is another outstanding record."

== Track listing ==
Standard version (physical, compact disc)
No.	Title	Writer(s)	Length
1.	"We Believe"	Steven Curtis Chapman	5:05
2.	"One True God" (featuring Chris Tomlin)	Chapman, Matt Redman, Chris Tomlin	4:25
3.	"Amen"	Chapman, Rend Collective	4:06
4.	"Hallelujah, You Are Good" (featuring Matt Maher)	Chapman, Matt Maher	3:31
5.	"More Than Conquerors"	Chapman	5:20
6.	"Sing for You"	Chapman	5:08
7.	"Who You Say We Are"	Chapman	5:32
8.	"The Body"	Chapman	4:22
9.	"King of Love"	Chapman	5:28
10.	"We Are Listening"	Chapman	4:47
11.	"God of Forever"	Chapman, Brent Alan Milligan	4:25
12.	"Amen" (live)	Chapman, Rend Collective	4:30
13.	"One True God" (live)	Chapman, Redman, Tomlin	4:50
14.	"Who You Say We Are" (live)	Chapman	5:34
15.	"More Than Conquerors" (live)	Chapman	5:25
Total length:			72:28

Deluxe version (digital download)
No.	Title	Writer(s)	Length
1.	"We Believe"	Steven Curtis Chapman	5:05
2.	"One True God" (featuring Chris Tomlin)	Chapman, Matt Redman, Chris Tomlin	4:25
3.	"Amen"	Chapman, Rend Collective	4:06
4.	"Hallelujah, You Are Good" (featuring Matt Maher)	Chapman, Matt Maher	3:30
5.	"More Than Conquerors"	Chapman	5:19
6.	"Sing for You"	Chapman	5:08
7.	"Who You Say We Are"	Chapman	5:32
8.	"The Body"	Chapman	4:21
9.	"King of Love"	Chapman	5:28
10.	"We Are Listening"	Chapman	4:47
11.	"God of Forever"	Chapman, Brent Alan Milligan	4:25
12.	"We Believe" (live)	Chapman	5:28
13.	"Sing for You" (live)	Chapman	5:07
14.	"One True God" (live)	Chapman, Redman, Tomlin	4:50
15.	"More Than Conquerors" (live)	Chapman	5:26
16.	"Who You Say We Are" (live)	Chapman	5:34
17.	"Amen" (live)	Chapman, Rend Collective	4:30
Total length:			83:01

== Personnel ==
- Steven Curtis Chapman – lead vocals, acoustic piano (1, 11), acoustic guitars (3–6, 8, 11), backing vocals (3, 5, 6, 8–10)
- Brent Milligan – synthesizers (1), programming (1, 3, 5–11), acoustic guitar (1, 2, 7), electric guitars (1, 7, 11), bass, dulcimer (1), percussion (2), cello (4, 11), textures (4), synthesizer intro (5), backing vocals (5)
- Jeff Roach – synthesizers (1, 8), Yamaha CP-70 (8), tack piano (10), bass synth (10)
- Grant Pittman – synthesizers (1, 5–7), upright piano (5), acoustic piano (6)
- Joe Causey – programming (3)
- Matt Maher – acoustic piano (4), backing vocals (4)
- Brian Green – acoustic piano (7)
- Blair Masters – string arrangements (4, 9), acoustic piano (9), dulcimer (9), synthesizers (9)
- James Duke – electric guitar (1–3, 5–10)
- Caleb Chapman – electric guitar (2, 6, 11)
- Will Chapman – drums (1, 3, 6, 11)
- Josh Devine – drums (1)
- Jacob Schrodt – drums (2, 5, 7–10)
- David Angell – strings (4, 9)
- David Davidson – strings (4, 9)
- Sarigani Reist – strings (4, 9)
- Kristin Wilkinson – strings (4, 9)
- Christ Presbyterian Church Choir – backing vocals (1)
- Scott Sheriff – backing vocals (1)
- Lindsey Lee Taylor – backing vocals (1–3, 5–7, 9, 10)
- Micah Wilshire – backing vocals (2, 3, 5, 8, 9)
- Chris Tomlin – lead vocals (2)
- Harold Rubens – backing vocals (3)
- Zach Bright – backing vocals (3)
- David Brown – backing vocals (3)

Choir (Tracks 2, 5, 8, 10 & 11)

- Blaine Barcus, Ben Brown, Katelyn Grant, Annie Gullo, Rebekah Gunkel, Hannah Kerr, Michael D. Kerr, Nathaniel Kotras, Lindsey Kirkendall, Sarah Lowe, Carol Roundtree, Kayla Spelling, Tara Stepp, Vickie Willis and W. Scott Willis

Choir (Tracks 6 & 7)

- Herb Chapman, Sherri Chapman, Jillian Edwards, Bubba Frizzell, Erin Frizzell, Lauren Martin, Lindsey McCaul, Drew Middleton, Angela Moore, Lori Morrison and Anna Roberson

=== Live tracks (12–15) ===
- Steven Curtis Chapman – lead vocals, acoustic guitar
- Brian Green – keyboards, backing vocals
- James Duke – electric guitar, backing vocals
- Brent Milligan – bass, backing vocals
- Jacob Schrodt – drums

Choir (Tracks 12, 13 & 15)

- James Allen, Herb Chapman, Jared Dean, Kelly Dean, Angie George, Jineen Glover, Shane Glover, Katelyn Grant, Taylor Henry, Nathaniel Kotras, Jennifer Leonard, Lori Morrison and Renee Patterson

== Production ==
- Terry Hemmings – executive producer
- Blaine Barcus – A&R
- Steven Curtis Chapman – producer
- Brent Milligan – producer, recording at SCC's studio
- Oak Hills Church (San Antonio, Texas) – live song recording location
- Bobby Shin – choir recording (1), string recording (4, 9) at Little Big Sound (Nashville, Tennessee)
- Keith Harris – editing (2, 5, 6, 8, 9)
- Sean Mofitt – mixing
- Warren David – mix assistant
- Dave McNair – mastering at Dave McNair Mastering (Winston-Salem, North Carolina)
- Michelle Box – A&R production
- Jeremy Cowart – photography
- Nathan Ellis/Ellis Arts & e-Media – live photography
- Beth Lee – art direction
- Tim Parker – art direction, design
- Jonathan Powell – wardrobe
- Sheila Davis – grooming
- Creative Trust – management

== Charts ==
Chart (2016)	Peak position
US Billboard 200	87
US Top Christian Albums (Billboard)	4
