= First hand =

Firsthand (sometimes first hand or first-hand) means obtained directly from the primary source. The phrase may also refer to:

- First Hand (album), the debut album released by Steven Curtis Chapman
- Firsthand (TV series), a 2015 documentary series by Canadian network CBC
- First hand (card player), the player next to the dealer who starts the bidding or play in a card game.
- Firsthand, a careers website owned by Infobase
