= Deep Roots =

Deep Roots may refer to:

- Deep Roots (radio program), a Canadian radio program focusing on folk and roots music
- Deep Roots (Steven Curtis Chapman album), 2013
- Deep Roots (Lorez Alexandria album), 1962
- Deep Roots (novel), a 2018 novel by Ruthanna Emrys
- Deep Roots, a 2023 novel by Sung J. Woo
