= All About Love (Steven Curtis Chapman album) =

Studio album by Steven Curtis Chapman
- Released: January 16, 2003
- Recorded: 2002
- Studio: NRG Studios and Ocean Way Recording (Hollywood, California); Paragon Audio (Franklin, Tennessee); Oxford Sound (Nashville, Tennessee); Abbey Road Studios (London, England)
- Genre: Contemporary Christian music
- Length: 65:56
- Label: Sparrow
- Producer: Brown Bannister; Steven Curtis Chapman

Steven Curtis Chapman chronology
Declaration (2001)	All About Love (2003)	Christmas Is All in the Heart (2003)

Professional ratings
Review scores
Source	Rating
AllMusic	3/5 stars
Christianity Today	4.5/5 stars
Cross Rhythms	7/10 squares
Jesus Freak Hideout	4.5/5 stars

All About Love is the eleventh studio album by Christian singer Steven Curtis Chapman. It was released on January 16, 2003, by Sparrow Records. Chapman credited his wife, Mary Beth, as the inspiration for the album.

The album includes the first cover songs Chapman ever recorded in his catalogue of music, "I'm Gonna Be (500 Miles)" (originally recorded by The Proclaimers) and "I'll Take Care of You" (originally recorded by Ronnie Milsap).

== Track listing ==
All songs written by Steven Curtis Chapman, except where noted.

1. "All About Love" – 3:42
2. "Your Side of the World" – 4:25
3. "How Do I Love Her" – 4:57
4. "11-6-64" – 3:07
5. "You've Got Me" – 3:45
6. "I'm Gonna Be (500 Miles)" (Charlie Reid, Craig Reid) – 3:44
7. "Echoes of Eden" – 5:04
8. "Holding a Mystery" – 4:22
9. "We Will Dance" – 4:40
10. "We Belong Together (Tarzan and Jane)" – 3:16
11. "With Every Little Kiss" – 3:13
12. "Miracle of You" – 3:35
13. "I'll Take Care of You" (Glen Sutton, Archie Jordan) – 4:23
14. "I Will Be Here" – 4:13
15. "Moment Made for Worshipping" – 6:10
16. "When Love Takes You In" – 4:47

== Personnel ==
- Steven Curtis Chapman – lead vocals, backing vocals (1, 2, 4–8, 10–12), acoustic guitar (1–13, 15), electric guitar (1, 2, 5, 11, 12), slide guitar solo (3), acoustic guitar solo (13), acoustic piano (16)
- Chris Mosher – programming (1), synthesizers (1), keyboards (2, 5, 10, 11, 15), Hammond B3 organ (11, 15)
- Scott Sheriff – Hammond B3 organ (1), backing vocals (1, 5, 8, 10–12), melodica (4)
- Jon Guilotin – keyboards (2, 4, 5, 10, 11), acoustic piano (3, 12), Hammond B3 organ (3, 12), Wurlitzer electric piano (6), Rhodes electric piano (7, 13)
- Matt Rollings – acoustic piano (2, 4–6, 9, 11, 14, 15)
- Adam Anders – keyboards (8), bass (8)
- Bernie Herms – synthesizer (16)
- Randy Pearce – electric guitar (1, 8)
- Tim Pierce – electric guitar (2, 3, 5–7, 10–12, 15)
- Joey Canaday – bass (1)
- Leland Sklar – bass (2–7, 10–13, 15)
- Will Denton – drums (1, 8)
- Neil Wilkinson – drums (2–7, 10–13, 15)
- Luis Conte – percussion (2–7, 10–13, 15)
- Carl Marsh – orchestral arrangements and conductor (3, 9, 13–16)
- Gavyn Wright – concertmaster (3, 9, 13–16)
- The London Session Orchestra – strings (3, 9, 13–16)
- John Mark Painter – string arrangements (7, 8)
- David Angell, John Catchings, David Davidson, Conni Ellisor and Pamela Sixfin – strings (7, 8)
- Michael Mellett – backing vocals (1, 3, 8, 11, 12, 15)
- Jerard Woods – backing vocals (3)
- Jovaun Woods – backing vocals (3)
- Gene Miller – backing vocals (5)

Choir on "Moment Made For Worshipping"

- Leigh Ann Albrecht, Travis Cottrell, Nirva Dorsaint, Yvonne Hodges, Fiona Mellett, Michael Mellett, Leanne Palmore, Scat Springs, Jerard Woods and Jovaun Woods

== Production ==
- Mary Beth Chapman – executive producer
- Brown Bannister – producer
- Steven Curtis Chapman – producer
- Steve Bishir – recording, overdub recording, mixing (4, 5, 7–16)
- Hank Nirider – recording assistant (1), overdub recording assistant, digital editing
- Joseph Bogan – recording assistant (2–16)
- Jack Joseph Puig – mixing (1–3, 6)
- Chris Sutton – mix assistant (1–3, 6)
- Jonathan Allen – orchestra recording
- Andrew Dudman – orchestra recording
- Fred Paragano – digital editing
- Stephen Marcussen – mastering at Marcussen Mastering (Hollywood, California)
- Eberhard Ramm – music copyist
- Traci Bishir – production manager
- Michelle Bentrem – production managing assistant
- Randee St. Nicholas – photography
- Christiév Carothers – photo direction
- Jan Cook – art direction
- Benji Peck – design
- Traci Mayer – hair, make-up
- Gino Tanabe – stylist
