= Dive (Steven Curtis Chapman song) =

Single by Steven Curtis Chapman

from the album Speechless
- Released: 1999
- Genre: Contemporary Christian; Christian rock
- Length: 3:59
- Label: Sparrow
- Songwriter: Steven Curtis Chapman

Steven Curtis Chapman singles chronology
| "Speechless" (1999) | "Dive" (1999) | "Fingerprints of God" (2000) |

"Dive" is a song by contemporary Christian artist Steven Curtis Chapman, released as the second single from his 1999 album Speechless. "Dive" was covered by PureNRG on their final album Graduation: The Best of pureNRG. On February 22, 2019, a remixed country version was released as the lead single for Chapman's album Where the Bluegrass Grows. The song features country singer Ricky Skaggs.

== Personnel ==
- Steven Curtis Chapman – lead and backing vocals, acoustic guitar, electric guitar, dobro, track arrangement
- Randy Pearce – electric guitar
- Adam Anders – programming, bass, track arrangement
- Will Denton – drum loops
- Scott Sheriff – backing vocals

== Charts ==
Chart performance for "Dive"
| Chart (1999) | Peak position |
|---|---|
| US Christian AC (CCM Magazine) | 1 |
| US Christian CHR (CCM Magazine) | 1 |

== Critical reception ==
"Dive" won the Dove Award for Pop/Contemporary Recorded Song of the Year at the 31st GMA Dove Awards. It was also nominated for Song of the Year at that same event.
