= Joy (Steven Curtis Chapman album) =

Studio album by Steven Curtis Chapman
- Released: October 16, 2012
- Studios: Sainte Claire (Lexington, Kentucky); Beech Creek Studio and Dan's Place (Brentwood, Tennessee); Soundwerks and Little Big Sound (Nashville, Tennessee); African Children's Choir recorded in North Carolina
- Genres: Contemporary Christian music, Christmas music
- Length: 44:57
- Label: Reunion
- Producers: Steven Curtis Chapman; Brent Milligan

Steven Curtis Chapman chronology
Re:creation (2011)	Joy (2012)	Deep Roots (2013)

Joy (stylized JOY) is a holiday studio album by contemporary Christian musician Steven Curtis Chapman. His third Christmas album and seventeenth studio album, it has seen commercial charting success, and garnered generally positive reviews from music critics.

== History ==
Released on October 16, 2012, Joy is Chapman's first release with Sony Music, following the 2011 breakup of EMI where his published works were sold to Sony Music Publishing, he joined Sony Music for his recorded music also. It is one of several Christmas albums that Chapman has done over the past few years. The album was produced by Chapman and Brent Milligan. The African Children's Choir performs on several tracks.

The cover album cover is intended to convey a 1950s styling that characterizes a number of the songs.

== Music and lyrics ==
Seven of the album's 13 tracks are renderings of traditional Christmas carols such as "Joy to the World" and "We Three Kings" as well as popular modern Christmas songs such as "Let It Snow! Let It Snow! Let It Snow!" and "Do You Hear What I Hear?". Chapman employs a full range of orchestration and his "trademark acoustic/pop sound" on these songs, and shows his versatility for a variety of musical arrangements on his own original compositions, including a piano ballad, slow jazz tune, and 1950s-style rockabilly.

== Critical reception ==
Professional ratings
Review scores
Source	Rating
Christian Music Zine	4.25/5
CM Addict	4/5 stars
Cross Rhythms	8/10 stars
Indie Vision Music	3/5 stars
Jesus Freak Hideout	3.5/5 stars
The Phantom Tollbooth	4/5 stars
Worship Leader	4.5/5 stars

Joy received generally positive reviews from music critics. Worship Leader rated the album four-and-a-half stars and called it another classic. Brendan O'Regan of Cross Rhythms rated it eight out of ten, and stated that the songs had been given a "fresh and contemporary makeover". At Jesus Freak Hideout, Jen Rose rated it three-and-a-half stars, and wrote that it was "bright and fun and certainly lives up to its name". Jonathan Andre of Indie Vision Music, who rated the album three stars, said it was "one of [Chapman's] best", and at The Phantom Tollbooth, Michael Dalton rated it four stars, and called it "one of the best releases of the season". Joshua Andre of Christian Music Zine rated it 4.25 out of five, and wrote that it has "vulnerable, moving and pertinent songs". At CM Addict, Grace Thorson rated it four stars, and said it was "full of joy" for the holiday season.

== Commercial performance ==
Joy was No. 185 on the U.S. Billboard 200 album chart for December 15, 2012, and reached No. 7 on the Christian Albums chart.

== Track listing ==
No.	Title	Writer(s)	Length
1.	"Joy to the World"	Lowell Mason, Isaac Watts	3:12
2.	"Christmas Time Again"	Caleb Chapman, Steven Curtis Chapman	3:13
3.	"Christmas in Kentucky"	S.C. Chapman	4:17
4.	"Do You Hear What I Hear?"	Noël Regney, Gloria Shayne Baker	4:10
5.	"Christmas Kiss"	S.C. Chapman	3:24
6.	"Let It Snow! Let It Snow! Let It Snow!"	Sammy Cahn, Jule Styne	2:27
7.	"Christmas Time Is Here"	Vince Guaraldi, Lee Mendelson	2:28
8.	"What Child Is This?"	William Chatterton Dix	3:40
9.	"In the Bleak Midwinter"	Gustav Holst, Christina Rossetti	3:25
10.	"Christmas Card"	S.C. Chapman	3:55
11.	"We Three Kings"	John Henry Hopkins, Jr.	4:27
12.	"I Am Joseph (God Is with Us)"	S.C. Chapman	3:59
13.	"Happy New Year"	S.C. Chapman	2:20
Total length:			44:57

== Personnel ==
- Steven Curtis Chapman – lead vocals, backing vocals (1–4, 7–13), acoustic guitar (1–4, 8–12), mandolin (1, 3), percussion (1, 7), electric guitar (2, 5), guitar solo (2, 5), banjo (3), glockenspiel (4, 10), guitars (6, 7), acoustic piano (13)
- Blair Masters – acoustic piano (1, 3–5, 8–12), Hammond B3 organ, (1–4, 10–12), French horns (4), keyboards (9)
- Ben Shive – acoustic piano (6)
- Adam Lester – electric guitar (1–3, 10, 11), percussion (1), vibrato electric guitar (5), mandola (8), acoustic guitar (11, 12), baritone guitar (11)
- Brent Milligan – bass (1, 3, 4, 6–8, 10–12), arco bass (1, 4), percussion (1, 3, 8, 10), upright bass (2, 5), vibraphone (2, 5), keyboards (4), cello (7–9, 12), baritone guitar (9), electric guitar (10), glockenspiel (10, 13)
- Dan Needham – drums (1–5, 8, 10–12), percussion (1–5, 8, 10–12), cymbal swells (13)
- Danny Gottlieb – drums (6)
- Joe Causey – kalimba (1)
- Beth Gottlieb – percussion (6), jingle bells (6)
- John Mark Painter – horns (8)
- John Catchings – cello (1, 3, 4, 11)
- Kris Wilkinson – viola (1, 3, 4, 11)
- David Angell – violin (1, 3, 4, 11)
- David Davidson – violin (1, 3, 4, 11)
- The African Children's Choir 38 – choir (1, 3, 4, 8)
- Luke Brown – backing vocals (3, 11)
- Jillian Edwards – backing vocals (12)

Gang vocals on "Christmas Time Again"

- Steven Curtis Chapman, Adam Lester, Blair Masters, Brent Milligan and Dan Needham

== Production ==
- Terry Hemmings – A&R
- Blaine Barcus – A&R
- Steven Curtis Chapman – producer
- Brent Milligan – producer, African Children's Choir recording (1, 3, 4, 8), drum recording (3), recording (6, 7, 13)
- Andy Hunt – recording (1–5, 8–12)
- Bobby Shin – string recording (1, 3, 4, 11), African Children's Choir recording (1, 3, 4, 8)
- Dan Needham – drum recording (3)
- Tim Price – second engineer (1–5, 8–12)
- Cailon Williams – second engineer (1–5, 8–12)
- Robert Gay – recording assistant (6, 13)
- Marty Gay – recording assistant (6, 13)
- F. Reid Shippen – mixing (1, 3, 4, 8) at Robot Lemon (Nashville, Tennessee)
- Erik Jahner – mix assistant (1, 3, 4, 8)
- Shane D. Wilson – mixing (2, 5, 6, 10, 11) at Pentavarit (Nashville, Tennessee)
- Evan Redwine – mix assistant (2, 5, 6, 10, 11)
- Sean Moffitt – mixing (7, 9, 12, 13)
- Warren David – mix assistant (7, 9, 12, 13)
- Joe Causey – editing, tuning
- Dave McNair – mastering at Dave McNair Mastering (Winston-Salem, North Carolina)
- Michelle Box – A&R production
- Jenny Stika – A&R administration
- Russ Harrington – photography
- Camille Blinn – photography
- Beth Lee – art direction
- Tim Parker – art direction, design
- Jonathan Powell – wardrobe
- Robin Geary – grooming
- Jim Houser – management
- Dan Raines – management

== Charts ==
Chart (2012)	Peak position
US Billboard 200	185
US Top Christian Albums (Billboard)	7
