= All I Really Want for Christmas =

Studio album by Steven Curtis Chapman
- Released: September 27, 2005
- Recorded: Mid-2005
- Genre: Christmas, gospel
- Length: 52:33
- Label: Sparrow/EMI
- Producer: Ed Cash, Brown Bannister, Steven Curtis Chapman

Steven Curtis Chapman chronology
The Abbey Road Sessions (2005)	All I Really Want for Christmas (2005)	Musical Blessings (2006)

Professional ratings
Review scores
Source	Rating
Jesus Freak Hideout	4.5/5 stars

All I Really Want for Christmas is the second Christmas album and thirteenth studio album by Steven Curtis Chapman, released on September 27, 2005. The album includes traditional holiday favorites such as "Go Tell It on the Mountain" and "Silver Bells", as well as some of Chapman's own Christmas songs, some of which had appeared on his previous Christmas albums.

Chapman's adopted daughter, Shaohannah, appears with her father on the album cover. On the first track, she reads the passage of the Nativity of Jesus (Luke 2:7-14) with the music of "The Night Before Christmas" (track 13) in the background.

== Track listing ==
Album release
No.	Title	Length
1.	"Luke 2:7-14 as told by Shaoey"	1:31
2.	"Angels from the Realms of Glory"	4:42
3.	"I Heard the Bells on Christmas Day"	4:09
4.	"All I Really Want"	4:53
5.	"The Miracle of Christmas"	4:03
6.	"Go Tell It on the Mountain"	3:33
7.	"Christmas Is All in the Heart"	5:01
8.	"Silver Bells"	3:41
9.	"Winter Wonderland"	2:51
10.	"God Rest Ye Merry Gentlemen"	3:59
11.	"It Came Upon the Midnight Clear"	4:20
12.	"O Little Town of Bethlehem"	4:57
13.	"The Night Before Christmas"	4:14
14.	"Shaoey and Her Dad Wish You a Merry Christmas"	0:30
Total length:		52:24

== Credits ==
- Steven Curtis Chapman – producer, lead vocals, piano (1, 13), acoustic guitar (2, 4, 5, 7, 10), electric guitar (2, 4, 5, 10), programming (2), mandolin (4), string arrangement (4, 13), backing vocals (5, 10)
- Ed Cash – producer (1, 2, 4, 5, 7, 10, 13, 14), audio recording, audio recording backing vocals (2, 4), electric guitar (2), percussion (4, 5, 10), string arrangement (4, 13), programming (5, 7), acoustic guitar (7)
- Brown Bannister – producer (3, 6, 8, 9, 11, 12)
- Ed's, Franklin, Tennessee – recording location
- Stephan Sharp – recording assistant
- East Iris Recording Studios, Nashville, Tennessee – recording location
- David Leonard – mixing (1, 5, 7, 10, 13, 14)
- J.R. McNeely – mixing at The Sound Kitchen, Franklin, Tennessee (2, 4)
- Matt Weeks – mixing assistant
- Shawn Pelton – drums (2, 4, 5, 7, 10), programming (2, 4, 10)
- Craig Young – bass (2, 4, 5, 10)
- Byron House – bass (7, 13)
- Ben Shive – keyboards (1, 2, 4, 5, 7, 10), accordion (7)
- Adam Lester – electric guitar (2, 4, 5, 7, 10)
- Jerry Douglas – dobro (7)
- Vince Gill – backing vocals (7)
- Blair Masters – string arrangement (2, 4, 7, 13)
- Strings (2, 4, 7, 13)
  - Kristin Wilkinson – viola
  - Monisa Angell – viola
  - David Davidson – violin
  - David Angell – violin
  - Conni Ellisor – violin
  - Pam Sixfin – violin
  - Anthony LaMarchia – cello
- Brad O'Donnell – executive producer
- Bob Ludwig – mastering at Gateway Mastering, Portland, Maine
- Kristin Barlowe – photography
- Megan Thompson – grooming
- Joseph Cassell – wardrobe
- Jan Cook – creative direction
- Tim Frank – photo art direction
- Andy Norris Design – package design
