= Deep Roots (Steven Curtis Chapman album) =

Studio album by Steven Curtis Chapman
- Released: March 11, 2013
- Studio: Beech Creek Studios (Brentwood, Tennessee).
- Genre: Gospel, bluegrass, folk, worship
- Length: 46:55
- Label: Cracker Barrel, Steven Curtis Chapman
- Producer: Brent Milligan, Steven Curtis Chapman

Steven Curtis Chapman chronology
Joy (2012)	Deep Roots (2013)	The Glorious Unfolding (2013)

Deep Roots is the fifteenth studio album by Steven Curtis Chapman. Chapman alongside Cracker Barrel released the album on March 11, 2013.

== Background and recording ==
The album was recorded at Beech Street Studios by Brent King and mixed by him along with Sean Moffitt, while the album was mastered by Brad Blackwood from Euphonic Masters. The album has performances by his father, Herb Chapman Sr. and his brother Herb Chapman Jr. alongside ones from his eldest son, Caleb Chapman from Colony House, and his daughter-in-law, Jillian Edwards Chapman, who is married to his son, Will Chapman. The gospel music and bluegrass music legend Ricky Skaggs performs on this album.

== Critical reception ==
Professional ratings
Review scores
Source	Rating
Indie Vision Music	3/5 stars
Jesus Freak Hideout	4.5/5 stars
New Release Today	4.5/5 stars

Reviewing the album from Country Weekly, David Guy replies, "For the gospel and contemporary Christian fan, this album will be uplifting and a welcome addition to the catalog of a prolific artist." Mark Rice writes, "the album is a joy to listen to". John DiBiase describes, "Deep Roots is a wonderful, under-the-radar release that gets back to the basics in a refreshing way; it's a palette-cleanser for today's often overly busy music and a great tool for intimate worship. Don't miss it." Dawn Theresa states, "Deep Roots is more than just another hymns record – it's an artist reconnecting with his past and reminding us that hope and light are found in a deep-rooted faith." Jonathan Andre says, "A great purchase if you thoroughly enjoy the acoustic and bluegrass genre, this album is a great divergence from Steven, as he branches out into some new music. Well done Steven for a different, yet equally profound and welcoming album!"

== Track listing ==
No.	Title	Writer(s)	Length
1.	"'Tis So Sweet to Trust in Jesus"	Louisa M.R. Stead, William J. Kirkpatrick	4:13
2.	"How Great Thou Art" (featuring Jillian Edwards Chapman)	Stuart Hine	4:46
3.	"What a Friend We Have in Jesus" (featuring Ricky Skaggs)	Charles Crozat Converse, Joseph Medlicott Scriven	3:18
4.	"Blessed Assurance"	Fanny J. Crosby, Phoebe P. Knapp	5:03
5.	"Life is Like a Mountain Railroad (Life's Railway to Heaven)" (featuring Herb Chapman Sr. and Herb Chapman Jr.)	Ezra Snow, M.E. Abbey, Charles Tillman	3:55
6.	"He Touched Me" (featuring Herb Chapman Sr. and Herb Chapman Jr.)	William J. Gaither	3:08
7.	"Hiding Place"	Steven Curtis Chapman, Jerry Salley	4:00
8.	"Rock of Ages"	Augustus M. Toplady, Thomas Hastings	3:02
9.	"Be Still and Know" (featuring Caleb Chapman)	Chapman	2:57
10.	"His Eyes"	Chapman, James Elliott	3:38
11.	"My Redeemer is Faithful and True"	Chapman, Elliott	3:22
12.	"Cinderella"	Chapman	5:33
Total length:			46:55

== Personnel ==
- Steven Curtis Chapman – lead vocals, acoustic guitar, banjo
- Gordon Mote – acoustic piano
- Bryan Sutton – acoustic guitar, banjo
- Brent Milligan – baritone guitar, bass, cello
- Dan Dugmore – dobro, steel guitar
- Rob Ickes – dobro
- Scott Sheriff – backing vocals
- Jillian Edwards Chapman – lead and harmony vocals (2)
- Ricky Skaggs – lead and harmony vocals (3)
- Herb Chapman, Sr. – harmony vocals (5, 6), acoustic guitar (6), backing vocals (11)
- Herb Chapman, Jr. – harmony vocals (5, 6), backing vocals (11)
- Caleb Chapman – lead and harmony vocals (9)

== Production ==
- Steven Curtis Chapman – producer, arrangements (1, 3, 4, 5, 8)
- Brent Milligan – producer
- Brent King – recording, mixing
- Sean Moffitt – mixing
- Brad Blackwood – mastering at Euphonic Masters (Memphis, Tennessee)
- Jim Houser – management
- Dan Raines – management
- Chris Hollo – photography
- Camille Blinn – photography
- Dena Divito – thanking

== Chart performance ==
Chart (2013)	Peak position
US Billboard 200	68
US Top Bluegrass Albums (Billboard)	1
US Top Christian Albums (Billboard)	2
US Independent Albums (Billboard)	11
