= Brown Bannister =

Music producer and songwriter

Elliott Brown Bannister III is a contemporary Christian music producer and songwriter.

== Early life and education ==
Elliott Brown Bannister III was born in Topeka, Kansas.

== Career ==
Bannister released one album of his own, Talk to One Another, in 1981 on NewPax Records. It was reissued on the Reunion Records label five years later, featuring a newer recording of the album's final cut, "Create in Me a Clean Heart". The original NewPax version featured Ed DeGarmo on the Hammond B3 organ; the 1986 version featured Amy Grant and her then husband Gary Chapman on vocals. The 1986 version was released as a radio single and gained moderate airplay in some markets.

He has written many songs, notably for Amy Grant. Bannister also taught Grant in his Sunday School class at Belmont Church of Christ.

Bannister is best known for his work in the audio engineering, recording, and production industry. He formed his own independent label, Vireo Records, in 1991.

== Personal life ==
Ellie Holcomb is his daughter.

== Awards and accolades ==
Bannister was inducted into the Gospel Music Hall of Fame in 2025.

=== Dove Awards ===
- 1981: The Imperials, "Praise the Lord" - Song of the Year
- 1981: Debby Boone, With My Song - Album by a Secular Artist
- 1983: Amy Grant, Age to Age - Pop/Contemporary Album of the Year
- 1984: Debby Boone, Surrender - Album by a Secular Artist
- 1985: Amy Grant, Straight Ahead - Pop/Contemporary Album of the Year
- 1989: Amy Grant, Lead Me On - Pop/Contemporary Album of the Year
- 1992: Bruce Carroll, Sometime Miracles Hide - Country Album of the Year
- 1993: Paul Overstreet, Love is Strong - Country Album of the Year
- 1994: Michael English, Hope - Pop/Contemporary Album of the Year
- 1994: Bruce Carroll, Walk On - Country Album of the Year
- 1994: Petra, Wake Up Call - Rock Album of the Year
- 1996: Various Artists, My Utmost for His Highest – Special Event Album of the Year
- 1997: Steven Curtis Chapman, Signs of Life - Pop/Contemporary Album of the Year
- 1998: Producer of the Year
- 2000: Producer of the Year
- 2000: Steven Curtis Chapman, Speechless - Pop/Contemporary Album of the Year
- 2001: Producer of the Year
- 2002: Steven Curtis Chapman, Declaration - Pop/Contemporary Album of the Year
- 2002: Cece Winans, CeCe Winans – Contemporary Gospel Album of the Year
- 2003: Producer of the Year
- 2003: Amy Grant, Legacy...Hymns and Faith – Inspirational Album of the Year
- 2004: Producer of the Year
- 2006: Bart Millard, Hymned – Inspirational Album of the Year
- 2006: Amy Grant, Rock of Ages...Hymns and Faith - Inspirational Album of the Year
- 2007: End of the Spear Soundtrack – Instrumental Album of the Year
- 2012: The Story - Special Event Album of the Year

=== Grammy Awards ===
- 1980: Debby Boone, With My Song - Best Inspirational Performance
- 1982: Amy Grant, Age To Age - Best Gospel Performance, Contemporary
- 1983: Amy Grant, Ageless Medley - Best Gospel Performance, Female
- 1984: Amy Grant, "Angels" - Best Gospel Performance, Female
- 1984: Debby Boone & Phil Driscoll, "Keep the Flame Burning" from Surrender - Best Gospel Performance by a Duo or Group
- 1985: Amy Grant, Unguarded - Best Gospel Performance, Female
- 1988: Amy Grant, Lead Me On - Best Gospel Performance, Female
- 1992: Bruce Carroll, Sometimes Miracles Hide - Best Southern Gospel Album
- 1994: Petra, Wake-Up Call - Best Rock Gospel Album
- 1999: Steven Curtis Chapman, Speechless - Best Pop/Contemporary Gospel Album
- 2001: CeCe Winans, CeCe Winans - Best Pop/Contemporary Gospel Album
- 2004: Steven Curtis Chapman, All Things New - Best Pop/Contemporary Gospel Album
- 2005: Amy Grant, Rock of Ages, Hymns & Faith - Best Southern, Country or Bluegrass Gospel Album
- 2006: Third Day, Wherever You Are - Best Pop/Contemporary Gospel Album
