= The Glorious Unfolding =

Studio album by Steven Curtis Chapman
- Released: September 27, 2013
- Genre: CCM
- Length: 47:46
- Label: Reunion
- Producers: Steven Curtis Chapman; Brent Milligan

Steven Curtis Chapman chronology
Deep Roots (2013)	The Glorious Unfolding (2013)	Christmas Hymns (2015)

The Glorious Unfolding is the 16th studio album by the contemporary Christian musician Steven Curtis Chapman, released on September 27, 2013, by Reunion Records, and produced by himself along with Brent Milligan. This was his first regular album (third overall) released by Sony Music, and it was his nineteenth album in his career. The album has seen commercial success as well as critical acclaim.

== Critical reception ==
Professional ratings
Review scores
Source	Rating
AllMusic	4/5 stars
CCM Magazine	5/5 stars
Christian Music Review	4.5/5 stars
The Christian Music Review Blog	4/5 stars
Christian Music Zine	4.75/5
Cross Rhythms	9/10 squares
Indie Vision Music	5/5 stars
Jesus Freak Hideout	4/5 stars
Jesus Wired	4/5 stars
Louder Than the Music	4.5/5 stars
New Release Tuesday	4.5/5 stars
The Phantom Tollbooth	4/5 stars
Worship Leader	5/5 stars

The Glorious Unfolding earned critical acclaim from music critics. Andy Argyrakis of CCM magazine felt that "the veteran is still at the top of his game, once again redefining the contemporary pop sound he practically invented, alongside contemplative ballads the provide a strikingly vulnerable view of the singer/songwriter's soul." At New Release Tuesday, Dawn Teresa noted that this was "a landmark achievement and a career-defining record, an album for the ages that will take its place beside much acclaimed albums like The Great Adventure, Signs of Life, and Speechless", and called the release "nothing short of remarkable." At Worship Leader magazine, Mike Pueschell wrote that "There is a particular warmth and depth to this work—a master still creating masterful work." Lins Honeyman at Cross Rhythms stated that "the album as a whole, showcase a mature side to Chapman's work that comes only with personal experience and years in the business."

Mark Rice of Jesus Freak Hideout felt that "It would be difficult to put it on par with his very best like Speechless, The Great Adventure, or Beauty will Rise, but it will find a good home in many year-end top 10 lists (this reviewer's included)." However, Rice affirmed that "Steven Curtis Chapman has put out another winner. It's spiritually deep, extremely personal, and musically sublime. Chapman fans will love it, as should any CCM fan." Also Jesus Freak Hideout's, John DiBiase wrote that "Ultimately, The Glorious Unfolding soars above most other projects from today's CCM artists (especially from the newer talent), but it doesn't quite continue with the steam that the first few songs lead off with. Regardless, Chapman has given us another rewarding listen with The Glorious Unfolding, one that indeed beautifully unfolds its thought-provoking layers with each listen" At Allmusic, Andree Farias called this "an album of encouragement". DeWayne Hamby, reviewing the album for Charisma, says, "The Glorious Unfolding...places the artist back in familiar territory as he alternates between up-tempo pop rock and heartfelt ballads interlaced with messages of hope and encouragement...not a reinvention but a new collection of songs that fits well in Chapman's impressive catalog of hits."

At Indie Vision Music, Jonathan Andre affirmed that "The Glorious Unfolding is a grand masterpiece, and in time, will hopefully become one of the SCC greats alongside other standout albums in his career, from The Great Adventure to Speechless, This Moment, Signs of Life and Declaration." Louder Than the Music's Jono Davies affirmed "this album shows that Steven knows how to produce great songs that are heartfelt, meaningful and honest." Joshua Andre of Christian Music Zine highlighted that "after listening to this very musical diverse, compelling, heart-wrenching and personal album, I can truly say that Steven's work is beyond awesome, and his prowess as a songwriter once in a generation." In addition, Andre noted that "Moving labels after this long signifies a new beginning, a rebirth of sorts, and boy has Steven Curtis Chapman recorded a fine, vulnerable and touching new album, one that will capture the hearts and minds of all who will listen, and changes us all from the inside out."

At Christian Music Review, Daniel Edgeman called it "a beautiful album with a strong message of hope and faith in God", and noted that "This album would break the hardest of hearts." The Christian Music Review Blog's Jim Wilkerson felt the title track was disappointing, and even though "One of the traps he can sometimes fall into is letting some of his songs sound the same" that "he threw in enough surprises that he was able to avoid that in this album." Furthermore, Wilkerson affirmed that "His voice is one of the best in the industry and his songs can really move the soul", which he used this in order to create "yet another great album". At The Phantom Tollbooth, Michael Dalton called "This sometimes wistful look at the present and future is elegant." Lauren Kleist of Jesus Wired noted that "although some of the spark of past albums is definitely missing, Chapman has something to say and, as usual, he says it with creativity and panache."

== Chart performance ==
For the Billboard charting week of October 19, 2013, The Glorious Unfolding debuted at No. 27 on Billboard 200, and it was also the No. 2 Christian Albums that week. It also reached No. 20 on Top Digital Albums.

== Track listing ==
All tracks are written by Steven Curtis Chapman.

No.	Title	Length
1.	"Glorious Unfolding"	4:46
2.	"Love Take Me Over"	3:01
3.	"Take Another Step"	3:36
4.	"Something Beautiful"	3:03
5.	"Finish What He Started"	3:34
6.	"Only One and Only You"	3:35
7.	"See You in a Little While"	4:23
8.	"A Little More Time to Love"	4:51
9.	"Sound of Your Voice"	5:24
10.	"Together"	4:02
11.	"Michael and Maria"	3:46
12.	"Feet of Jesus"	3:45
Total length:		47:46

== Personnel ==
- Steven Curtis Chapman – lead vocals, backing vocals (1–5, 7–9, 11), acoustic piano (1, 3, 5–7), acoustic guitar (1–4, 7, 8, 11, 12), mandola (1), stomps (4), claps (4, 9), electric guitar (5), baritone acoustic guitar (9), percussion (9)
- Brent Milligan – programming (1, 5, 7), electric guitar (1–5, 7, 8, 12), bass (1–4, 7–9, 11), acoustic piano (2, 11, 12), synth bass (2, 5), claps (2–4, 9), stomps (2–4), percussion (3, 5, 6, 9, 11), backing vocals (4, 8, 9), horns (6), string arrangements (7, 11), bells (8), acoustic guitar (9), cello (11, 12), pad (12)
- Joe Causey – synthesizer (1), programming (1–5), electric guitar (2–4), stomps (4), claps (4), backing vocals (4), baritone (5, 9), Yamaha CP-70 (7), music box (9)
- Blair Masters – acoustic piano (7–9), dulcimer (8), accordion (9)
- Ben Shive – additional acoustic piano (ending on 7)
- Stuart Garrard – electric guitar (8, 9), guitar textures (9)
- Andy Leftwich – mandolin (11), violin (11, 12), string arrangements (11)
- Will Franklin Chapman – drums (1–5), cymbals (6)
- Dan Needham – drums (7)
- Ken Lewis – drums (8, 9), percussion (8, 9), claps (9)
- Sam Levine – penny whistle (11, 12)
- Scott Sheriff – backing vocals (1–3, 7–9, 11)
- Herb Chapman – backing vocals (3)
- Luke Brown – backing vocals (4)
- Jillian Edwards Chapman – backing vocals (9)
- Julia Chapman – backing vocals (9)
- Emily Richards – backing vocals (9)
- Mary Beth Chapman – backing vocals (9)
- Stevie Joy Chapman – backing vocals (9)

String Section (Tracks 1, 6 & 10)

- Carl Marsh – string arrangements
- Stephen Lamb – music copyist (1)
- Craig Nelson and Joel Reist – bass
- Julia Emahiser, Kristen Greer, Sarighani Reist and Sara Sant'Ambrogio – cello
- Hari Bernstein, Seanad Chang, Chris Farrell and Kristin Wilkinson – viola
- Carrie Bailey, Zeneba Bowers, Janet Darnall, David Davidson, Conni Elisor, Erin Hall, Connie Heard, Betsy Lamb, Stefan Petrescu, Pamela Sixfin, Mary Kathryn Vanosdale and Karen Winkleman – violin

The Love Sponge Strings (Track 7)

- David Angell, Monisa Angell, John Catchings and David Davidson – string players and arrangements

== Production ==
- Terry Hemmings – executive producer
- Blaine Barcus – A&R
- Brent Milligan – producer
- Steven Curtis Chapman – producer
- Andy Hunt – tracking engineer (1, 3–5)
- Russ Long – string recording (1, 6, 10) at Ben Folds' Studio
- Leslie Ritcher – string recording assistant (1, 6, 10)
- Bobby Shin – string recording (7) at Little Big Town (Nashville, Tennessee)
- Chris Lord-Alge – mixing (1, 2, 4) at Mix LA (Los Angeles, California)
- Sean Moffit – mixing (3, 5–12)
- Warren David – mix assistant (3, 5–12)
- Dave McNair – mastering at Dave McNair Mastering (Winston-Salem, North Carolina)
- Michelle Box – A&R production
- Jeremy Cowart – photography
- Beth Lee – art direction
- Tim Parker – art direction, design
- Jonathan Parker – wardrobe
- Melanie Shelley – grooming
- Jim Houser – management
- Dan Raines – management

== Charts ==
Chart (2013)	Peak position
US Billboard 200	27
US Top Christian Albums (Billboard)	2
US Digital Albums (Billboard)	20
