= Speechless (Steven Curtis Chapman album) =

Studio album by Steven Curtis Chapman
- Released: June 3, 1999
- Recorded: 1998
- Studio: The Sound Kitchen (Franklin, Tennessee); Abbey Road London, England)
- Genre: CCM
- Length: 55:25
- Label: Sparrow
- Producer: Brown Bannister; Steven Curtis Chapman

Steven Curtis Chapman chronology
Greatest Hits (1997)	Speechless (1999)	Declaration (2001)

Professional ratings
Review scores
Source	Rating
AllMusic	3/5 stars
Jesus Freak Hideout	4.5/5 stars

Speechless is the ninth studio album by American contemporary Christian music singer and songwriter Steven Curtis Chapman. It was released on June 3, 1999, by Sparrow Records.

It was certified platinum by the RIAA on November 27, 2000. Chapman received the 2000 Grammy Award for Best Pop/Contemporary Gospel Album and Dove Awards for Pop/Contemporary Album of the Year and Pop/Contemporary Recorded Song of the Year (for "Dive").

The album provided more No. 1 chart singles (seven) on Christian contemporary radio than any of Chapman's other albums: "The Change", "Fingerprints of God", "The Invitation", "Great Expectations", "Be Still and Know", "Dive" and the title song "Speechless". The album is considered one of Chapman's greater works by many and is recognized by many as being one of the best Christian albums of all time.

The concert tour in support of Speechless featured Chapman's longtime friend and co-writer Geoff Moore.

Marking the twenty-fifth anniversary of the album, Chapman launched the Speechless '25 tour with La Vie Quartet in September 2025.

== Track listing ==
All songs were written by Steven Curtis Chapman, except where noted.

1. "Dive" – 3:57
2. "Speechless" (Chapman, Geoff Moore) – 5:06
3. "The Change" (Chapman, James Issac Elliot) – 3:46
4. "Great Expectations" – 5:02
5. "Next 5 Minutes" (Adam Anders, Chapman) – 4:19
6. "Fingerprints of God" – 4:02
7. "The Invitation" (Chapman, Moore) – 4:57
8. "Whatever" – 4:01
9. "I Do Believe" – 4:01
10. "What I Really Want to Say" – 4:22
11. "With Hope" – 5:12
12. "The Journey" (Chapman, J.A.C. Redford) – 3:05
13. "Be Still and Know" – 3:19

== Track information ==
- Chapman dedicated the song "Fingerprints of God" to his daughter Emily who, at the time had turned 13.
- "With Hope" was written for a family, the Mullicans (friends of the Chapmans), who lost a child. It was later sung in honor of the victims of the 1997 Heath High School shooting in Paducah, Kentucky, Chapman's alma mater.
- "What I Really Want to Say" is dedicated to Chapman's wife, Mary Beth.

== Personnel ==
Musicians

- Steven Curtis Chapman – vocals, acoustic guitar (1, 2, 4–11), electric guitar (1, 3, 4, 6, 7, 9–11), dobro (1, 5, 8), "Papoose" guitar (2, 3), mandolin (2, 7), synth solo (8), track arrangements
- Shane Keister – acoustic piano (2, 13)
- Scott Sheriff – acoustic piano (4), Hammond B3 organ (6)
- Hardy Hemphill – acoustic piano (11)
- Randy Pearce – electric guitar (1–11), track arrangement (5), acoustic guitar (7)
- Adam Anders – programming (1–4, 8–10), bass (1–11), track arrangement (1, 3–5, 9, 10)
- Will Denton – drum loops (1), drums (2, 3, 5–8, 10, 11), track arrangement (5)
- Eric Darken – percussion (2, 8, 10)
- The London Session Orchestra – strings (2–4, 7, 10, 12, 13)
- Gavyn Wright – concertmaster (2–4, 7, 10, 12, 13)
- J.A.C. Redford – orchestral arrangements (2, 4, 7, 12, 13)
- Carl Marsh – orchestral arrangements (3, 10)

Background vocalists

- Steven Curtis Chapman – backing vocals (1–6, 8, 9)
- Scott Sheriff – backing vocals (1, 3, 6, 8)
- Chris Eaton – backing vocals (9)

Choir on "Speechless"

- Marvin Copaus, Shari Davis, Teresa Easterling, Rhonda Hampton, Hardy Hemphill, Stacy Jeanette, Scott Sheriff, Mark Smeby, Layde Love Smith, Andy Sperry, Scot Tyler and Tina Tyler

Scripture reading on "The Change"

- Emily Chapman, Caleb Chapman and Will Franklin Chapman

Handclaps on "Fingerprints of God"

- Steve Bishir, Steven Curtis Chapman, Ray Mullican, Hank Nirider and David Trask

=== Production ===
- Dan Raines – executive producer
- Peter York – executive producer
- Brown Bannister – producer
- Steven Curtis Chapman – producer
- Steve Bishir – recording, mixing
- Hank Nirider – recording assistant, mix assistant, additional engineer
- Jed Hackett – recording assistant
- Melissa Mattey – recording assistant
- James "JB" Baird – additional engineer
- Patrick Kelly – additional engineer
- Gary Paczosa – additional engineer
- Aaron Swihart – additional engineeri
- Shane D. Wilson – additional engineer
- Mark Tucker – orchestra recording
- Andrew Dudman – orchestra recording assistant
- Ted Jensen – mastering at Sterling Sound (New York City, New York)
- Traci Sterling Bishir – production manager
- Wayne Brezinka – art direction, design
- Jan Cook – art direction
- Christiév Carothers – creative director
- Robert Fleischauer – photography
- Gino Tanabe – stylist
- Catherine Furness – grooming

== Charts ==
=== Weekly charts ===
Weekly chart performance for Speechless
Chart (1999)	Peak position
US Billboard 200	31
US Christian Albums (Billboard)	1

=== Year-end charts ===
Year-end chart performance for Speechless
Chart (1999)	Position
US Billboard 200	182

== Certifications ==
Certifications for Speechless
Region	Certification	Certified units/sales
United States (RIAA)	Platinum	1,000,000^{^}
^{^} Shipments figures based on certification alone.
