= Real Life Conversations =

Studio album by Steven Curtis Chapman
- Released: April 1, 1988
- Studio: OmniSound Studios, Goldmine Studios, Downstage Studios and Great Circle Sound (Nashville, Tennessee)
- Genre: CCM, soft rock, pop
- Length: 41:27
- Label: Sparrow
- Producer: Phil Naish

Steven Curtis Chapman chronology
First Hand (1987)	Real Life Conversations (1988)	More to This Life (1989)

Professional ratings
Review scores
Source	Rating
AllMusic	4.5/5 stars

Real Life Conversations is the second album by American contemporary Christian music singer and songwriter Steven Curtis Chapman. The album was released in 1988 by Sparrow Records and produced by Phil Naish.

This second album features a harder and edgier sound that steers more toward light rock music than his previous album.

== Track listing ==
All songs written by Steven Curtis Chapman, except where noted.

1. "Faithful Too" (Chapman, Geoff Moore) – 4:02
2. "Tuesday's Child" (Chapman, Dave Mullen, Dale Oliver) – 4:12
3. "For Who He Really Is" (Chapman, Moore) – 5:08
4. "Consider It Done" – 3:46
5. "His Eyes" (Chapman, James Isaac Elliot) – 3:36
6. "The Human Race" (Chapman, Elliot) – 3:43
7. "Wait" (Margaret Becker, Chapman) – 4:14
8. "Truth or Consequences" – 5:07
9. "My Turn Now" (Chapman, Brent Lamb) – 3:28
10. "His Strength Is Perfect" (Chapman, Jerry Salley) – 4:36

== Personnel ==
Musicians

- Steven Curtis Chapman – lead vocals, backing vocals, guitars
- Phil Naish – keyboards, backing vocals
- Jon Goin – guitars
- Mark O'Connor – mandolin, mandola
- Mike Brignardello – bass
- Mark Hammond – drums
- Alan Moore – string arrangements (5, 7)
- Carl Gorodetzsky – string leader (5, 7)
- The Nashville String Machine – strings (5, 7)
- Geoff Moore – guest vocal (1)
- Herb Chapman – backing vocals
- Chris Rodriguez – backing vocals

Volunteer Choir on "His Strength Is Perfect"

- Dee Dee Addison
- Lisa Angelle
- Keith Boyd
- Mike Brignardello
- Bruce Carroll
- Emily Chapman
- Sherri Chapman
- Debbie Cunningham
- Ken Cunningham
- Dennis Disney
- Tony Elenburg
- Elizabeth Groner
- Celeste Hammond
- P. WE Herman
- Brad Jamison
- Rhonda Kissinger
- Greg Kroeker
- Suzanne Kroeker
- Brent Lamb
- Missy McGinty
- Geoff Moore
- Becky Naish
- Michael Puryear
- Charley Redmond
- Delyn Redmond
- Chris Rodriguez
- Lisa Rodriguez
- Jerry Salley
- Amy K. Smith
- Brian White
- Robin Wilkes
- BeBe Winans
- Sharon Ziegler

== Production ==
- Phil Naish – producer
- Ronnie Brookshire – recording
- Carry Summers – assistant engineer
- Bob Clark – string engineer
- Jeff Balding – mixing
- Denny Purcell – mastering at Georgetown Masters (Nashville, Tennessee)
- Cindy Wilt – production manager
- Mark Tucker – photography
- 5 Penguins Design – design
- Barbara Catanzaro-Hearn – art direction
