= Signs of Life (Steven Curtis Chapman album) =

Studio album by Steven Curtis Chapman
- Released: August 22, 1996
- Studio: The Castle (Franklin, Tennessee); Ocean Way Recording (Hollywood, California)
- Genre: CCM
- Length: 56:29
- Label: Sparrow
- Producer: Brown Bannister; Steven Curtis Chapman

Steven Curtis Chapman chronology
| The Music of Christmas (1995) | Signs of Life (1996) | Greatest Hits (1997) |

Professional ratings
Review scores
| Source | Rating |
|---|---|
| Allmusic | 3/5 stars |

Signs of Life is the eighth studio album by Steven Curtis Chapman. It was released on August 22, 1996, and later certified gold by the RIAA.

== Track listing ==
All songs written by Steven Curtis Chapman, except where noted.

1. "Lord of the Dance" (Chapman, Scotty Smith) – 5:21
2. "Children of the Burning Heart" – 4:30
3. "Signs of Life" – 4:28
4. "The Walk" – 4:45
5. "Let Us Pray" – 3:57
6. "Free" – 6:43
7. "Only Natural" – 3:35
8. "Rubber Meets the Road" – 4:13
9. "Celebrate You" – 4:31
10. "What I Would Say" – 5:41
11. "Land of Opportunity" (Chapman, Geoff Moore) – 4:53
12. "Hold on to Jesus" (Chapman, James Isaac Elliot) – 3:52

== Personnel ==
- Steven Curtis Chapman – lead vocals, backing vocals, acoustic guitar (1–5, 7–9), dobro (1, 10, 12), slide acoustic guitar (1, 2), "bongo" dobro (1), electric guitar (2, 3), mandolin (2, 4), electric guitar solo (3, 8, 11), 12-string acoustic guitar (6), Roland VG-8 synth guitar (6, 7), 12-string guitar (7), Telecaster slide solo (7), lap steel guitar (9)
- Phil Madeira – Hammond B3 organ (1, 3, 5, 6, 11), National dobro (7), Wurlitzer electric piano (8)
- Shane Keister – Hammond B3 organ (2), Rhodes electric piano (3, 9), acoustic piano (6, 10, 11)
- Blair Masters – Wurlitzer electric piano (5), keyboards (9, 12)
- Gordon Kennedy – electric guitar (1–4, 6–11), acoustic guitar (5), 12-string guitar (11)
- Kenny Greenberg – electric guitar (1, 2, 5, 6, 8, 10, 11), acoustic guitar (3, 4, 7, 9)
- Jerry Douglas – lap steel guitar (4, 8)
- Leland Sklar – bass
- Chris McHugh – drums (1, 2, 7, 10, 11)
- Steve Brewster – drums (3, 6, 9, 12)
- Chad Cromwell – drums (4, 5, 8)
- Eric Darken – percussion
- Sam Bacco – percussion (10)
- Stuart Duncan – fiddle (1, 2)
- Tommy Morgan – harmonica (7)
- Carl Marsh – string arrangements (6, 10)
- The Nashville String Machine – strings (6, 10)

== Production ==
- Dan Raines – executive producer
- Peter York – executive producer
- Brown Bannister – producer
- Steven Curtis Chapman – producer
- Steve Bishir – recording
- Eddie Miller – assistant engineer
- Hank Nirider – assistant engineer
- Jack Joseph Puig – mixing
- Jim Champagne – mix assistant
- Doug Sax – mastering at The Mastering Lab (Hollywood, California)
- Traci Sterling Bishir – production manager
- Karen Philpott – creative direction
- Traci Daberko – design
- Joyce Revoir – additional design and production
- John Ragel – photography
- Johnny Villanueva – hair and make-up
- Ariana Lambert – stylist

== Charts ==
| Chart (1996) | Peak position |
|---|---|
| US Billboard 200 | 20 |
| US Top Contemporary Christian | 2 |

== Certifications ==
| Country | Sales | Certifications (sales thresholds) |
|---|---|---|
| United States (RIAA) | 500,000 | Gold |
