= Beauty Will Rise =

Studio album by Steven Curtis Chapman
- Released: November 3, 2009
- Studio: The Art House (Bellevue, Tennessee); Little Big Room, Robot Lemon, Vibe 56, The Carport and Soundwerks (Nashville, Tennessee); The Castle (Franklin, Tennessee)
- Genre: CCM
- Length: 49:51
- Label: Sparrow
- Producer: Brent Milligan; Steven Curtis Chapman

Steven Curtis Chapman chronology
This Moment (2007)	Beauty Will Rise (2009)	Re:creation (2011)

Professional ratings
Review scores
Source	Rating
AllMusic	4/5 stars
Billboard	86/100
CCM Magazine	4/5 stars
Christian Broadcasting Network	4/5 stars
The Christian Manifesto	5/5 stars
Christianity Today	4/5 stars
Cross Rhythms	10/10 squares
Jesus Freak Hideout	4.5/5 stars 3.5/5 stars
Louder Than the Music	5/5 stars
Noisy Whisper	5/5 stars

Beauty Will Rise is Steven Curtis Chapman's 15th studio album, released on November 3, 2009.

== Background ==
Many of the songs on the album are inspired by the accidental death of Chapman's youngest daughter, Maria Sue Chunxi Chapman. Extensive liner notes by Chapman describe how each song was related to the grieving process that he and his family went through after she died. The album was produced by Brent Milligan and initial recordings took place while Chapman was on tour in various locations such as hotel rooms, backstage dressing rooms, and theatre lobbies. "Beauty Will Rise" is dedicated to Maria Sue.

== Singles ==
The album's lead single, "Heaven Is the Face", was released to radio on August 21, 2009, peaking at No. 7 on Billboard's Hot Christian Songs chart.

== Commercial performance ==
Up to December 25, 2009, the album has sold over 81,000 copies. The album debuted at No. 27 on the US Billboard 200 chart and No. 1 on the Top Christian Albums chart.

== Track listing ==
All tracks are written by Steven Curtis Chapman, except where noted.

Album release
No.	Title	Writer(s)	Length
1.	"Heaven Is the Face"		3:44
2.	"Beauty Will Rise"		5:29
3.	"SEE"		4:36
4.	"Just Have to Wait"		3:38
5.	"Faithful"		4:42
6.	"Questions"		3:30
7.	"Our God is in Control"	Mary Beth Chapman, Steven Curtis Chapman	4:00
8.	"February 20"		3:51
9.	"God is It True (Trust Me)"		3:24
10.	"I Will Trust You"		4:15
11.	"Jesus Will Meet You There"		4:13
12.	"Spring is Coming" (featuring the Children of the World Choir)		4:34
Total length:			49:48

== Personnel ==
- Steven Curtis Chapman – lead vocals, acoustic piano (1–3, 8, 9), acoustic guitar (1, 2, 4–7, 9–12), backing vocals (2, 5, 7, 9), snare drum (2), mandolin (4), percussion (4), electric guitar (5, 6), programming (10)
- Joe Causey – programming (1, 2, 5, 7, 12), electric guitar (1, 2, 6, 10), percussion (1), acoustic piano (6, 7, 12), trumpet (7), Rhodes (10)
- Brent Milligan – cello (1, 2, 4, 5, 10–12), baritone (1), acoustic piano (4, 10), bass (4–6, 10, 11), keyboards (5), percussion (5, 9, 10), pads (6), bass drum (12), cymbals (12)
- Ben Shive – celeste (2), dulcimer (2)
- Ken Lewis – percussion (1, 6), bass drum (1), ride cymbal (1), drums (2, 10)
- Will Franklin Chapman – drums (5, 10)
- Richie Biggs – bass drum (12), cymbals (12)
- David Davidson – violin (2), strings (3, 12)
- David Angell – strings (3, 12)
- Monisa Angell – strings (3, 12)
- John Catchings – strings (3, 12), cello (8)
- Blair Masters – string arrangements (3, 12)
- John Mark Painter – horns (12), horn arrangements (12)
- Scott Sheriff – backing vocals (5, 10)

== Production ==
- Steven Curtis Chapman – producer
- Brent Milligan – producer, tracking (7)
- Russ Long – tracking (2), piano tracking (3), mixing (3, 6–11)
- Jeff Pitzer – violin recording (2)
- Baeho "Bobby" Shin – string engineer (3, 12)
- John Mark Painter – horn recording (12)
- Steve Dady – children choir recording (12)
- Konrad Snyder – tracking assistant (2)
- Taylor Grubbs – tracking assistant (3)
- Scott Velazco – tracking assistant (3)
- Richie Biggs – mixing (1, 4, 12)
- F. Reid Shippen – mixing (2)
- Buckley Miller – mix assistant (2)
- Joe Causey – editing (1–5, 7, 8, 12)
- Adam Ayan – mastering at Gateway Mastering (Portland, Maine)
- Jess Chambers – A&R administration
- Bert Sumner – packaging design
- Dale Manning – packaging design, packaging photography
- Austin Mann Photography – album cover design, China photography, China collage
- Jim Houser – management
- Dan Raines – management

== Charts ==
=== Peak positions ===
Chart (2010)	Peak position
US US Billboard 200	27
US Billboard Top Christian Albums	1

=== Certifications and sales ===
Country	Sales
United States	781,461
