= Declaration (Steven Curtis Chapman album) =

Studio album by Steven Curtis Chapman
- Released: September 13, 2001
- Studio: Sound Kitchen and The Laundry Room (Franklin, Tennessee); The Parlor and Seventeenth Grand Recording (Nashville, Tennessee); AIR (London, UK)
- Genre: Contemporary Christian music, rock, pop
- Length: 56:46
- Producer: Brown Bannister; Steven Curtis Chapman

Steven Curtis Chapman chronology
Speechless (1999)	Declaration (2001)	All About Love (2003)

Professional ratings
Review scores
Source	Rating
AllMusic	4/5 stars
Jesus Freak Hideout	4.0/5 stars

Declaration is the tenth studio album by the American contemporary Christian music singer and songwriter Steven Curtis Chapman. It was released on September 13, 2001, by Sparrow Records and it has been certified Gold.

The national concert tour that followed with Nichole Nordeman as the opening act, traveled to over 70 cities in 2002. The tour featured a re-telling of the story of five missionaries who were killed by the Huaorani people in 1956 while working in Ecuador. Each night after the story, Chapman introduced Steve Saint (the son of the slain missionary Nate Saint) and Mincaye (a native who killed the missionaries) as his guests on-stage. On Declaration, Mincaye can be heard chanting in his native language at the end of "No Greater Love".

== Track listing ==
All songs written by Steven Curtis Chapman, except where noted.

1. "Live Out Loud" (Chapman, Geoff Moore) – 3:55
2. "This Day" – 4:36
3. "Jesus is Life" (Chapman, James Isaac Elliot) – 3:32
4. "No Greater Love" – 4:58
5. "God is God" – 4:17
6. "See the Glory" (Chapman, Caleb Chapman) – 3:36
7. "Bring It On" – 4:16
8. "When Love Takes You In" – 4:43
9. "Magnificent Obsession" – 5:02
10. "Declaration Of Dependence" – 3:51
11. "God Follower" – 4:19
12. "Carry You to Jesus" – 4:05
13. "Savior" – 5:36

== Personnel ==
- Steven Curtis Chapman – lead vocals, backing vocals (1–7, 9–12), acoustic guitar, electric guitar, percussion, marimba, acoustic piano (8)
- Chris Mosher – keyboards, programming, Hammond B3 organ, backing vocals (10)
- Bernie Herms – synthesizer (8)
- Randy Pearce – electric guitar, additional acoustic guitar (2)
- Leland Sklar – bass (1, 3, 4, 10–12)
- Joey Canaday – bass (2, 6, 7, 9)
- Will Denton – drums (1–4, 6, 7, 9–11), percussion (5, 13)
- Eric Darken – percussion
- Carl Marsh – orchestra arrangements (2, 5–9, 12, 13)
- Gavyn Wright – concertmaster (2, 5–9, 12, 13)
- The London Session Orchestra – strings (2, 5–9, 12, 13)
- Scott Sheriff – backing vocals (1–3, 10, 11)
- Michael Mellett – backing vocals (4, 5, 12)
- Mincaye – chant (4)
- Gene Miller – backing vocals (6, 7, 9)

Party Choir on "Live Out Loud"

- Ashley Anderson, Nathan Barber, Caroline Bishop, Emily Chapman, Niki Chapman, Jennifer L. Clanton, Wesley Clanton, Sarah Dickerson, Steph Dragoo, Peter Ferrell, Anna Flautt, Daniel Green, J.J. Green, Brandon Harris, Jason Jung, Lynn Jung, Courtney Keen, Ashley Melling, Grace Monger, Hans Nelson, Margaret Patton, Gabe Pigg, Landon Pigg, Rebecca Shores and Robert Stowers

Handclaps on "Declaration of Dependence"

- Steven Curtis Chapman, Eric Darken, James Isaac Elliot and David Trask

== Production ==
- Dan Raines – executive producer
- Peter York – executive producer
- Brown Bannister – producer
- Steven Curtis Chapman – producer
- Steve Bishir – recording, mixing
- Hank Nirider – recording assistant
- Patrick Kelly – additional engineer
- Fred Paragano – digital editing
- Geoff Foster – orchestra recording
- Steve Hall – mastering at Future Disc (North Hollywood, California)
- Traci Sterling Bishir – production manager
- Michelle Bentrem – production managing assistant
- Jan Cook – art direction
- Christiév Carothers – creative direction
- Bob Frame – photography
- Traci Fleming-Smith – grooming
- Gino Tabe – stylist
- DINO – props
- SMOG – design
