= Bruce Carroll =

American singer

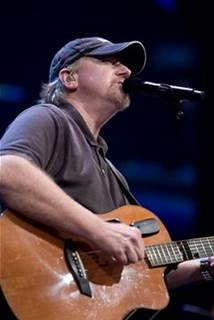
- Bruce Carroll leading weekly worship at Hope Church in Memphis, TN

Background information
- Origin: Memphis, Tennessee
- Genres: Gospel music, inspirational
- Occupation(s): Christian music singer, songwriter
- Instrument: Guitar
- Years active: 1979–present
- Labels: Word Records, Benson Records

Bruce Carroll is an American CCM singer and a recording artist.

== Biography ==
Carroll first began performing in a trio with his siblings at age 12; he played folk music in various venues in and around Texas in the 1970s. In 1979 he became a born-again Christian and eventually moved to Nashville. Signing with Word Records, Carroll became a successful Christian music singer, releasing several albums which sold well in the genre and winning seven Dove Awards. Two of his recordings, The Great Exchange (1990) and Sometimes Miracles Hide (1992), won Grammy Awards for Best Southern Gospel, Country Gospel, or Bluegrass Gospel Album.

== Discography ==
STUDIO ALBUMS

- 1987 Something Good is Bound to Happen (Word Records)
- 1988 Richest Man In Town (Word Records)
- 1990 The Great Exchange (Word Records) U.S. Billboard Christian charts #22
- 1991 Sometimes Miracles Hide (Word Records) U.S. Christian #18
- 1993 Walk On (Word Records) U.S. Christian #18
- 1996 Speed of Light (Benson Records)
- 1998 Boomerang (Benson Records)
- 2005 Big World (On the Grove)
- 2013 TBA Studio Album (On the Grove)

COMPILATIONS / GREATEST HITS / LIVE ALBUMS

- 1990 Our Hymns (Word Records)
- 1992 Evening Tapestry (Warner Bros.)
- 1992 Our Family (Word Records)
- 1994 One Summer Evening... Live (Word Records)
- 1997 For the Record (Best of... ) (Word Records)
- 2000 A Day of Hope (On the Grove)
- 2001 A Night of Hope (On the Grove)
- 2002 Hope Christmas (On the Grove)
- 2002 Return Of The Killer B's (On the Grove)
- 2003 Hope Specials: Volume 1 (On the Grove)
- 2004 Hope Worship: Volume 1 (On the Grove)

SINGLES

- 2012 Hands of Hope

== Career events ==
In 2012 Carroll co-wrote the piece Hands of Hope with David Meece and David L. Cook which reached number one on the RadioactiveAirplay.com charts in May 2012. The song was used as the theme song for Turning Point Centers for Domestic Violence. On May 5, 2012 the song was nominated for a Southeast Emmy for best Arrangement/Composition.

== Personal life ==
For 15 years, Carroll was the worship leader at Hope Presbyterian Church located in Cordova, Tennessee.
