= All Things New (Steven Curtis Chapman album) =

Studio album by Steven Curtis Chapman
- Released: September 9, 2004
- Studios: Sunset Sound, Henson Recording Studios and Ocean Way Recording (Hollywood, California); Image Recording Studios (Los Angeles, California); Oxford Sound and The Tracking Room (Nashville, Tennessee)
- Genre: Contemporary Christian music
- Length: 51:16
- Label: Sparrow
- Producers: Brown Bannister; Steven Curtis Chapman

Steven Curtis Chapman chronology
Christmas is all in the Heart (2003)	All Things New (2004)	The Abbey Road Sessions (2005)

Professional ratings
Review scores
Source	Rating
AllMusic	3.5/5 stars
CCM Magazine	A-
Christianity Today	4.5/5 stars
Cross Rhythms	9/10 squares
Jesus Freak Hideout	4.5/5 stars
The Phantom Tollbooth	3.5/5 stars

All Things New is the twelfth studio album by Steven Curtis Chapman. It was released on September 9, 2004, by Sparrow Records.

In 2005, the album won the Grammy Award for Best Pop/Contemporary Gospel Album; unusually for Chapman, however, the album did not win the corresponding Dove Award that year (2005), although it had been nominated.

The "All Things New" concert tour in support of this album included Casting Crowns and the worship leader Chris Tomlin.

== Track listing ==
All tracks are written by Steven Curtis Chapman.

Album release
No.	Title	Length
1.	"All Things New" (featuring Jason Wade)	5:41
2.	"Much of You"	4:51
3.	"Only Getting Started" (featuring Jonny Lang)	3:44
4.	"Last Day on Earth"	4:17
5.	"What Now"	4:37
6.	"Please Only You"	3:44
7.	"Coming Attractions"	4:07
8.	"Big Story"	4:20
9.	"Believe Me Now (Chapman, James Isaac Elliot)" (featuring Mac Powell of Third Day)	4:34
10.	"Angels Wish"	4:01
11.	"I Believe in You"	3:43
12.	"Treasure of Jesus"	3:29
Total length:		51:16

== Personnel ==
- Steven Curtis Chapman – lead vocals, backing vocals (1, 3–9, 11), acoustic piano (1, 4, 7, 10, 12), acoustic guitar (1–3, 5–8, 11, 12), electric guitar (1, 4, 9), dobro (3), mandolin (3), 12-string acoustic guitar (4, 9), synthesizer (7), bouzouki (7), Leslie pedal (8)
- Patrick Warren – keyboards (1, 4–6, 8, 10, 11), Chamberlin (4, 9), acoustic piano (5), additional keyboards (7)
- Dan Needham – programming (3, 7, 8)
- Lyle Workman – electric guitar (1–11)
- George Cocchini – electric guitar (1, 2, 4, 6–9)
- Jonny Lang – electric guitar solo (3), backing vocals (3)
- Chris Chaney – bass (1–11)
- Matt Chamberlain – drums (1–11), loops (3)
- Ric Robbins – DJ (3)
- Jason Wade – backing vocals (1)
- Pierre Haxaire – spoken intro (7)
- Mac Powell – backing vocals (9)
- Kendall Payne – backing vocals (11)

Strings (Tracks 2, 10 & 12)

- Patrick Warren – arrangements
- Larry Corbett – cello
- Susie Katayama – cello
- Steve Richards – cello
- Dan Smith – cello
- Reggie Hamilton – string bass
- Ian Walker – string bass
- Bob Becker – viola
- Denyse Buffum – viola
- Matt Funes – viola
- Karie Prescott – viola
- Charlie Bisharat – violin
- Mario DeLeon – violin
- Joel Derouin – violin
- Armen Garabedian – violin
- Berg Garabedian – violin
- Peter Kent – violin
- Natalie Legget – violin
- Michelle Richards – violin

Production

- Dan Raines – executive producer
- Peter York – executive producer
- Brown Bannister – producer
- Steven Curtis Chapman – producer
- Trina Shoemaker – recording
- Steve Bishir – recording
- Ryan Castle – recording, digital editing
- Danny Duncan – recording, digital editing
- Jed Hackett – digital editing
- Bill Whittington – digital editing
- Jess Sutcliffe – string recording
- Glenn Pittman – string recording assistant
- Jamie Sickora – string recording assistant
- Chris Lord-Alge – mixing (1, 2, 5, 9, 10, 12)
- Jack Joseph Puig – mixing (3, 4, 6–8, 11)
- Bob Ludwig – mastering at Gateway Mastering (Portland, Maine)
- Shari Sutcliffe – production coordinator, for Belgravia Music (Los Angeles)
- Ken Johnson – production coordinator, for Production Services (Nashville)
- Jan Cook – creative direction
- Gravillis, Inc. – art direction, design
- Kwaku Alston – photography
- David Kaufman – stylist
- Tracy Moyer – grooming
