= For the Sake of the Call =

Studio album by Steven Curtis Chapman
- Released: December 13, 1990
- Studio: Nightingale Studio, OmniSound Studios, Digital Recorders, Hummingbird Studio and Treasure Isle Recorders (Nashville, Tennessee)
- Genre: CCM, rock, pop
- Length: 44:25
- Label: Sparrow
- Producer: Phil Naish

Steven Curtis Chapman chronology
More to This Life (1989)	For the Sake of the Call (1990)	The Great Adventure (1992)

For the Sake of the Call is the fourth album released by contemporary Christian music singer Steven Curtis Chapman. The album was released in 1990 by Sparrow Records.

It won the 1992 Grammy Award for Best Pop/Contemporary Gospel Album and the Gospel Music Association award as Pop/Contemporary Album of the Year and was RIAA-certified as Gold on December 6, 1994.

Professional ratings
Review scores
Source	Rating
Allmusic	4.5/5 stars

== Track listing ==
All songs written by Steven Curtis Chapman, except where noted.

1. "For the Sake of the Call" – 5:29
2. "What Kind of Joy" – 4:36
3. "Busy Man" – 4:28
4. "Lost In the Shadow"(Chapman, James Isaac Elliot) – 5:00
5. "Higher Ways"(Chapman, Phil Naish) – 4:20
6. "Blind Lead the Blind"(Chapman, Geoff Moore) – 4:46
7. "You Know Better"(Chapman, Bob Sauer) – 3:43
8. "When You Are a Soldier" – 3:34
9. "No Better Place"(Chapman, Naish) – 3:50
10. "Show Yourselves to Be" – 4:26
11. "For the Sake of the Call" (reprise) – 1:15

== Personnel ==
- Steven Curtis Chapman – lead vocals, acoustic guitar, mandolin, backing vocals (2–7, 9, 10), electric guitar (3), classical guitar (5)
- Phil Naish – keyboards (1–6, 8, 9)
- Dann Huff – electric guitars (1–6, 9)
- Jackie Street – bass (1–6, 9)
- Craig Nelson – acoustic bass (7)
- Paul Leim – drums (1–7, 9)
- Chris McDonald – trombone (2, 6), horn arrangements (2, 6)
- Barry Green – trombone (2, 6)
- Mike Haynes – trumpet (2, 6)
- George Tidwell – trumpet (2, 6)
- Don Wyrtzen – string arrangements and conductor (5, 8, 10, 11)
- Carl Gorodetzsky – string leader (5, 8, 10, 11)
- The Nashville String Machine – strings (5, 8, 10, 11)
- Christ Church Choir – choir (1)
- Herb Chapman – backing vocals (2–7, 9, 10)
- Chris Rodriguez – backing vocals (2–7, 9, 10)
- Bob Sauer – backing vocals (7), whistle (7)
- Brent Lamb – backing vocals (9)

== Production ==
- Peter York – executive producer
- Phil Naish – producer
- Ronnie Brookshire – recording
- Jim DeMain – assistant engineer
- Patrick Hutchinson – assistant engineer
- Patrick Kelly – assistant engineer
- Gary Paczosa – assistant engineer
- Ed Simonton – assistant engineer
- Carry Summers – assistant engineer
- Jeff Balding – mixing at Digital Recorders
- John Hurley – mix assistant
- Doug Sax – mastering at The Mastering Lab (Hollywood, California)
- Cindy Wilt – production manager
- Barbara Hearn – art direction
- Nick Newton – design
- Alan Dockery – photography
