= The Great Adventure (Steven Curtis Chapman album) =

Studio album by Steven Curtis Chapman
- Released: June 19, 1992
- Studio: Studio at Mole End (Franklin, Tennessee); Nightingale Studio, Quad Studios, OmniSound Studios, Skylab Studios and Great Circle Sound (Nashville, Tennessee)
- Genre: Contemporary Christian
- Length: 49:43
- Label: Sparrow
- Producer: Phil Naish

Steven Curtis Chapman chronology
For the Sake of the Call (1990)	The Great Adventure (1992)	The Live Adventure (1993)

Professional ratings
Review scores
Source	Rating
AllMusic	3/5 stars
Jesus Freak Hideout	4.5/5 stars

The Great Adventure is the fifth album released by Christian singer Steven Curtis Chapman. The album was released on June 19, 1992, by Sparrow Records. It went Gold in just under one year, being certified.

The album was listed at No. 33 in the 2001 book, CCM Presents: The 100 Greatest Albums in Christian Music. It brought Chapman several Gospel Music Association awards at the 24th GMA Dove Awards in 1993, including Song of the Year (with Geoff Moore), Pop/Contemporary Recorded Song of the Year, and Short Form Music Video of the Year for the title song, and Pop/Contemporary Album of the Year. The album also won the 1993 Grammy Award for Best Pop/Contemporary Gospel Album.

The album features guest appearances by artists like Toby McKeehan (dc Talk), BeBe Winans, and Ricky Skaggs. Also, the song "Maria" was co-written by Chapman's wife.

== Track listing ==
All tracks written by Steven Curtis Chapman, except where noted.

1. "Prologue" (instrumental) (J.A.C. Redford) – 2:37
2. "The Great Adventure" (Chapman, Geoff Moore) – 4:35
3. "Where We Belong" – 4:19
4. "Go There With You" – 5:21
5. "That's Paradise" (Chapman, Geoff Moore) – 4:59
6. "Don't Let the Fire Die" – 4:48
7. "Got to B Tru" (featuring TobyMac) – 4:18
8. "Walk With the Wise" (Chapman, Brent Lamb) – 4:34
9. "Maria" (Chapman, Mary Beth Chapman, James Isaac Eliott) – 5:01
10. "Still Called Today" (featuring BeBe Winans) – 6:00
11. "Heart's Cry" (Chapman, Phil Naish) – 3:11
12. "Real Life Medley" 3:15 (BONUS TRACK Fan Pack Edition)

== Personnel ==
- Steven Curtis Chapman – vocals (2–10), backing vocals (2, 3, 5–10), acoustic guitars (2–10), electric guitar (7)
- Cheryl Rogers – acoustic piano (1)
- Phil Naish – keyboards
- Jo-El Sonnier – accordion (8)
- Dann Huff – guitars
- Jerry McPherson – guitars
- Scott Sanders – dobro
- Rusty Young – lap steel guitar, additional dobro
- Jackie Street – bass
- Paul Leim – drums
- Mark Hammond – drum programming (7, 9)
- Mark Douthit – soprano sax solo (10)
- The Nashville String Machine – orchestra (1, 4, 11)
- Carl Gorodetzky – contractor (1, 4, 11)
- J.A.C. Redford – composer, arrangements and conductor (1); string and brass arrangements (4)
- Don Wyrtzen – string arrangements (11)
- Brent Lamb – backing vocals (2, 3, 10)
- Kip Raines – backing vocals (2, 3, 10)
- Trace Balin – backing vocals (5, 9)
- Chris Rodríguez – backing vocals (5, 9)
- Herb Chapman – backing vocals (7)
- Mark Heimermann – backing vocals (7)
- Toby McKeehan – rap (7)
- Lionel Cartwright – backing vocals (8)
- Ricky Skaggs – backing vocals (8)
- BeBe Winans – vocals (10)

Yells on "Got to B Tru"

- Chad Ballantyne, Herb Chapman, Steven Curtis Chapman, Steve Charles, Jason Cole, James Isaac Elliot, Marty Funderburk, Chris Moore, Phil Naish and Todd Robbins

== Production ==
- Peter York – executive producer
- Phil Naish – producer
- Ronnie Brookshire – engineer, mixing (7–11)
- Bill Deaton – mixing (1–6)
- Steve Bishir – additional engineer
- Patrick Kelly – additional engineer, assistant engineer
- Carry Summers – additional engineer
- John Kunz – assistant engineer
- Todd Robbins – assistant engineer
- Carol Bobolts for Red Herring Design – design
- Frank W. Ockenfels 3 – photography
- Helena Occhipinti – hair, make-up
- Jeffrey Tay Stylists – stylists
