= More to This Life =

Studio album by Steven Curtis Chapman
- Released: October 5, 1989
- Studio: OmniSound Studios and Quad Studios (Nashville, Tennessee); The Pond (Franklin, Tennessee); Gold Mine Studio (Brentwood, Tennessee); Studio 55 (Los Angeles, California)
- Genre: CCM, rock, pop
- Length: 50:22
- Label: Sparrow
- Producer: Phil Naish

Steven Curtis Chapman chronology
Real Life Conversations (1988)	More to This Life (1989)	For the Sake of the Call (1990)

Professional ratings
Review scores
Source	Rating
AllMusic	3/5 stars
Jesus Freak Hideout	(?)

More to This Life is the third album released by American contemporary Christian music singer and songwriter Steven Curtis Chapman. It was released in 1989 by Sparrow Records.

== Track listing ==
All songs written by Steven Curtis Chapman, except where noted.

1. "More to This Life" (Chapman, Phil Naish) – 5:15
2. "Love You With My Life" – 3:23
3. "Waiting for Lightning" (Chapman, Tony Elenburg) – 3:44
4. "Living for the Moment" – 4:52
5. "I Will Be Here" – 4:28
6. "Who Makes the Rules" (S. Chapman, Herb Chapman, James Isaac Elliot) – 3:31
7. "Treasure Island" – 4:52
8. "Way Beyond the Blue" – 5:45
9. "In This Little Room" (Chapman, Geoff Moore) – 3:37
10. "More Than Words" – 4:33
11. "Out in the Highways" (Chapman, Moore) – 4:59 (This version is not included in the audio cassette version)

== Personnel ==
- Steven Curtis Chapman – lead vocals, backing vocals, acoustic guitar, electric guitar, rhythm arrangements
- Phil Naish – keyboards, rhythm arrangements
- Jon Goin – acoustic guitar, electric guitar
- Don Potter – slide acoustic guitar (6)
- Mark O'Connor – violin (6), mandolin (10)
- Jackie Street – bass
- Mark Hammond – drums
- Don Wyrtzen – string arrangements and conductor (3, 5, 8)
- Carl Gorodetzsky – string leader (3, 5, 8)
- The Nashville String Machine – strings (3, 5, 8)
- Herb Chapman – backing vocals
- Chris Harris – backing vocals
- Mark Heimermann – backing vocals
- Chris Rodriguez – backing vocals

== Production ==
- Phil Naish – producer
- Jeff Balding – recording, mixing
- Ronnie Brookshire – additional engineer
- Steve Bishir – assistant engineer
- Barry Ray Dixon – assistant engineer
- Howard Levy – assistant engineer
- Carry Summers – assistant engineer
- Denny Purcell – mastering at Georgetown Masters (Nashville, Tennessee)
- Cindy Wilt – production manager
- Mark Tucker – photography
- Brenda Whitehill – design
- Barbara Hearn – art direction
