= First Hand (album) =

Studio album by Steven Curtis Chapman
- Released: June 15, 1987
- Studio: The Bennett House (Franklin, Tennessee); OmniSound Studios, Hummingbird Studio, Goldmine Studios, Center Stage Studio and Downstage Studios (Nashville, Tennessee)
- Genre: CCM, country, soft rock, pop
- Length: 42:39
- Label: Sparrow
- Producer: Phil Naish

Steven Curtis Chapman chronology
First Hand (1987)	Real Life Conversations (1988)

Professional ratings
Review scores
Source	Rating
Allmusic	3/5 stars
Jesus Freak Hideout	(not rated)

First Hand is the debut album released by Christian singer Steven Curtis Chapman. The album was released in 1987 by Sparrow Records and features the single "Weak Days".

The album features a blend of country music with soft rock and pop.

== Track listing ==
All songs written by Steven Curtis Chapman, except where noted.

1. "First Hand" (Niles Borop, Chapman, Phil Naish) – 3:38
2. "Weak Days" (Chapman, James Isaac Elliot) – 4:20
3. "Hiding Place" (Chapman, Jerry Salley) – 4:49
4. "Run Away" – 4:22
5. "Do They Know" – 4:01
6. "Tell Me" – 4:21
7. "Who Cares" (Chapman, Geoff Moore, Naish) – 5:07
8. "Dying to Live" – 3:37
9. "Said and Done" – 5:10
10. "My Redeemer Is Faithful and True" (Chapman, Elliot) – 3:47

== Personnel ==
- Steven Curtis Chapman – lead vocals, backing vocals, guitars, guitar solo (8)
- Phil Naish – keyboards
- Jon Goin – guitars
- Mike Brignardello – bass
- Mark Hammond – drums
- Alan Moore – string orchestrations (5, 10)
- Carl Gorodetzsky – string leader (5, 10)
- The Nashville String Machine – strings (5, 10)
- Herb Chapman – backing vocals, featured backing vocal (5)
- Wayne Kirkpatrick – backing vocals
- Chris Rodriguez – backing vocals

== Production ==
- Greg Nelson – executive producer
- Phil Naish – producer
- Jeff Balding – engineer
- Mike Clute – assistant engineer
- Bill Whittington – assistant engineer
- Denny Purcell – mastering at Georgetown Masters (Nashville, Tennessee)
- Cindy Wilt – production coordinator
- Mark Tucker – photography
- Buddy Jackson – design
- Barbara Catanzaro-Hearn – art direction
- Beth Middleworth – title illustration
- Jane Golden – cover image of Santa Monica mural
