= Steven Curtis Chapman =

American contemporary Christian music singer-songwriter

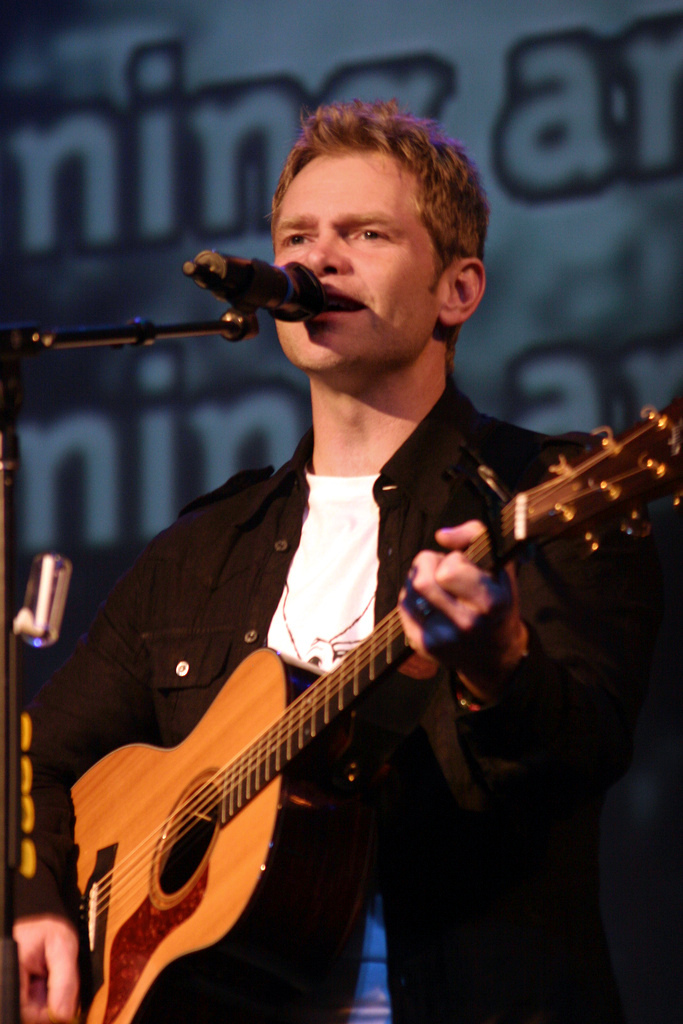
- Chapman performing in Atlanta, November 2004

Background information
- Born: Steven Curtis Chapman; November 21, 1962 (age 63); Paducah, Kentucky, U.S.
- Origin: Nashville, Tennessee, U.S.
- Genre: Contemporary Christian music
- Occupations: Musician; singer; songwriter; record producer; actor; author
- Instruments: Vocals, guitar, piano
- Years active: 1987–present
- Labels: Sparrow; EMI; Epic; PolyEast; Sony BMG; Provident
- Website: stevencurtischapman.com

Steven Curtis Chapman (born November 21, 1962) is an American contemporary Christian music singer, songwriter, record producer, actor, author, and social activist.

Chapman began his career in the late 1980s as a songwriter and performer of contemporary Christian music and released over 25 albums. He has also won five Grammy Awards and 59 Gospel Music Association Dove Awards, more Dove awards than any other artist in history. His seven "Artist of the Year" Dove Awards are also an industry record. As of 2022, Chapman has sold more than 16 million albums and has 10 RIAA-certified Gold or Platinum albums.

On July 27, 2024, he was invited to become a member of the Grand Ole Opry by Ricky Skaggs.

== Biography ==
Steven Curtis Chapman was born to Judy and Herb Chapman in Paducah, Kentucky, on November 21, 1962. Steven's father is a guitar teacher and owns a music store in Paducah; Steven and his older brother Herb Jr. grew up playing the guitar and singing.

After graduating from high school, Chapman enrolled as a pre-med student at Georgetown College in Kentucky. After several semesters, he transferred to Anderson College for a short time but dropped out. He went to Nashville to pursue a career in music, briefly attending Belmont University. He began working at an Opryland USA music show in East Nashville while being involved in songwriting. In the 1980s, Chapman wrote a song called "Built to Last", which was recorded by prominent gospel group the Imperials. The success of the song landed him a songwriting deal with Sparrow Records; he rose to prominence there. By 2007, artists like Sandi Patty, Billy Dean, Glen Campbell, the Cathedral Quartet and Roger Whittaker had recorded Chapman's songs.

=== Sparrow Era ===
In 1987, Chapman released his first album, First Hand. The album included the song "Weak Days", which peaked at No. 2 on the Contemporary Christian Music chart. In 1988, he followed with his second album, Real Life Conversations, earning him four more hits including the No. 1 song "His Eyes". The song, which was co-written with James Isaac Elliott, earned the Contemporary Recorded Song of the Year award from the Gospel Music Association in 1989. In the same year, he also won a GMA Award for Songwriter of the Year. Next Chapman released more albums including More to This Life and For the Sake of the Call. These albums featured several No. 1 singles and were awarded several GMA Awards. The latter gave Chapman his first Grammy in the Best Pop Gospel Album category. These achievements strengthened his position in the Christian music scene.

In 1992, Chapman made a successful shift into a more mainstream audience with his album The Great Adventure. The album garnered Chapman two more Grammys, for the album and for the title track video, again in gospel categories.

=== EMI Era ===
After Sparrow Records was purchased by EMI/Liberty, they began to market the album to a broader audience pushing it to gold status in 1993. The success of the album prompted Chapman to record one of his concerts and release it as The Live Adventure, both as a video and a CD. This continuation won Chapman more GMA Awards, and also a new award from American Songwriter magazine for Songwriter and Artist of the Year.

Heaven in the Real World, Signs of Life, and Speechless continued his success. In 2000, he provided the voice of Baloo in The Jungle Book Groove Party and reprised the role 22 years later in Chip 'n Dale: Rescue Rangers. In 2001 with the release of Declaration, Chapman got more attention in the Billboard 200. That album along with 2003's All About Love, peaked in the Top 15. The follow-up, All Things New, peaked at No. 22. Chapman has also released four Christmas albums, beginning with 1995's The Music of Christmas. In 2003 he released Christmas Is All in the Heart exclusively through Hallmark Gold Crown Stores and in 2005, he released All I Really Want for Christmas and finally Joy was released in 2012. Chapman has been a frequent guest performer at Walt Disney World, and has been a guest narrator for Disney's Candlelight Processional, most recently appearing in 2016, 2019, and 2021.

In 2006, Chapman toured several Asian countries. His website said that his concert for U.S. troops serving in South Korea was the first Christian concert ever performed for the troops in that country, and a concert in Shanghai, China, was "the first public performance by a Gospel recording artist event in the city open to China passport holders", and the third-largest concert in Shanghai that spring. He went to Australia, New Zealand, the Philippines, Hong Kong, and Singapore on the tour. During the time, his song "The Blessing" reached No. 1 on Thailand radio charts.

In 2007, Chapman co-headlined NewSong's annual Winter Jam tour with Jeremy Camp. For the tour, he brought his sons' band, Colony House, on tour to play as his backing band, along with longtime keyboardist Scott Sheriff. Chapman also released This Moment, which included the hit singles "Cinderella" and "Yours", in October 2007. "Cinderella" was chosen for WOW Hits 2009. On April 20, 2008, Chapman was awarded a star on Nashville's Walk of Fame for his contributions in Christian music. On November 3, 2009, Chapman released his seventeenth album Beauty Will Rise. Many of the songs from this album are inspired by the death of his daughter, Maria Sue. He claims that the songs on the album are his "personal psalms". Chapman, his wife, and two sons have a tattoo of the flower that Maria drew before her untimely death.

=== Move to Sony Music ===
Chapman became a free agent following a series of deals in 2011 by Citigroup that broke up EMI (and Sparrow Music), with the recorded music division sold to Universal Music Group (UMG) and music publishing operations to Sony/ATV Music Publishing. In August 2012, Chapman announced his recorded music move to Sony Music, which had previously acquired his published music in the 2011 breakup. He released his fourth Christmas album, JOY, on October 16, 2012, his first with Sony, being assigned to their Provident Music Group's Reunion Records imprint. Deep Roots was released exclusively through Cracker Barrel Old Country Store, Inc. on March 11, 2013. In September 2013, Sony released Chapman's eighteenth album (the second with Reunion Records), The Glorious Unfolding, which is also his first studio album in seven years that features completely original material. The album received critical acclaim, with many critics ranking it among his other chart-topping albums. The album peaked at No. 27 on the US Billboard 200.

From September 2014 until September 2017, Chapman hosted the Sam's Place: Music for the Spirit concert series at the Ryman Auditorium in Nashville and featured performances including MercyMe, Amy Grant, Michael W. Smith, and Third Day. In 2015, Chapman released "Warrior" as the official song for the soundtrack to War Room. "Amen", was sent to Christian AC radio on October 6, 2015. In 2019, Chapman released the sequel to his Billboard Bluegrass number one Album Deep Roots entitled Deeper Roots: Where the Bluegrass Grows, which also peaked at number one on the Billboard Bluegrass chart.

=== Grand Ole Opry Membership ===
On July 27, 2024, Chapman was invited to become a member of the Grand Ole Opry by Ricky Skaggs. He was inducted November 1, 2024 by Lady A and is, to date, the only contemporary Christian musician to hold Opry membership. His father and brother joined him on stage to sing a song together and fulfilled his father's lifelong dream of singing at the Grand Ole Opry.

== Personal life ==
Chapman is a devout Christian and is married to Mary Beth Chapman (née Chapman). They met in the early 1980s at Anderson University in Anderson, Indiana, and married in the fall of 1984. The couple live in Franklin, Tennessee, and have three biological children: Emily Elizabeth, Caleb Stevenson, and Will Franklin. They adopted three daughters from China; Shaohannah Hope Yan, Stevey Joy Ru, and Maria Sue Chunxi.

Chapman and his wife together have written three children's books with adoption themes: Shaoey And Dot: Bug Meets Bundle (2004), Shaoey and Dot: The Christmas Miracle (2005), and Shaoey and Dot: A Thunder and Lightning Bug Story with illustrations by Jim Chapman (2006). Chapman's modern fairytale, Cinderella: The Love of a Daddy and His Princess (2008) chronicles and celebrates the blessings of childhood, family, love, and life. Together with minister Scotty Smith, Chapman has authored two books for the adult inspirational market: Speechless (1999), and Restoring Broken Things (2005). Chapman's song "All About Love" has been featured in commercials for the Fox television show Celebrity Duets. In 2016, he released the memoir Between Heaven and the Real World: My Story.

Chapman and his sons recorded a cover of the song "I Love My Lips" under the name of "Stevenson" after his oldest son Caleb Stevenson for the 2003 Veggie Rocks album. His sons Caleb and Will perform together as the band Colony House. Chapman is best friends with Geoff Moore. On November 10, 2011, Chapman and his wife became grandparents for the first time when a baby girl, Eiley Eliza Richards, was born to Emily and her husband Tanner Richards in Belfast, Northern Ireland.

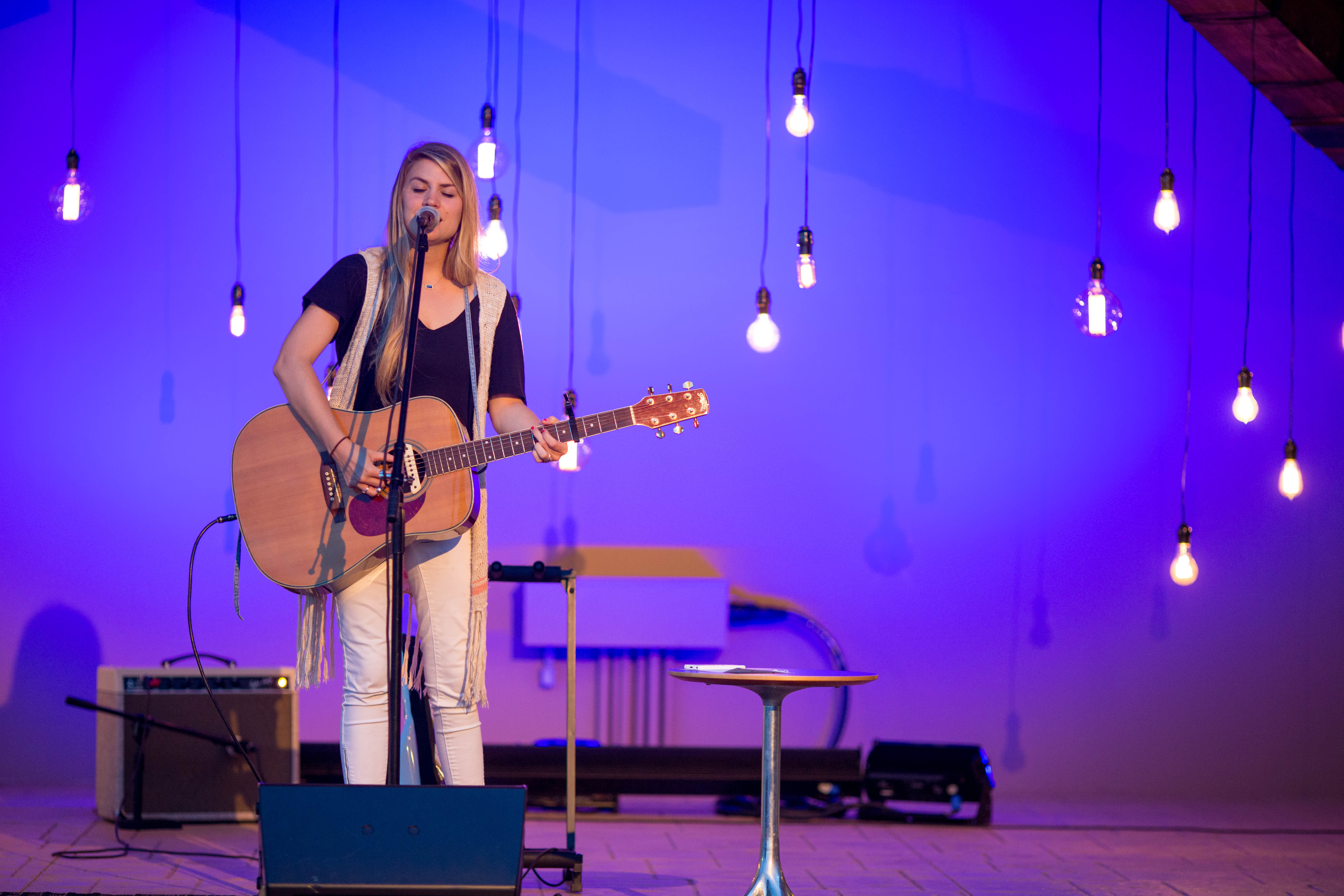
Jillian Edwards is Chapman's daughter-in-law. She is shown performing in Chesterfield, Missouri west of St. Louis. July 2015.

Chapman's brother-in-law, Jim Chapman, is the bass vocalist in the 1990s country music group 4 Runner and his father, Herb is also in the group. Steven's younger son, Will Chapman, married singer/songwriter Jillian Edwards from Richardson, Texas, which is next to Dallas, in December 2012. They have a daughter, Willow Faye, born in November 2017. Steven's older son Caleb is married to Julia, and they have two children, Noble (born 2012) and Olive (born 2018).

=== Death of Maria Sue Chunxi Chapman ===
Maria Sue Chunxi Chapman died from her injuries and blood loss in a driveway accident on May 21, 2008. The accident happened eight days after Maria's 5th birthday. Will Chapman was pulling into the driveway of their house after he auditioned for a musical at school and Maria Sue was running to meet him so she could ask Will to put her on the monkey bars. They did not see each other in time and Will accidentally ran over Maria. Steven's family did CPR on Maria while they were waiting for the paramedics to arrive. They were unable to revive her. Maria was life-flighted via air medical services to Vanderbilt Children's Hospital. The paramedics tried but failed to save Maria on the way to the hospital. Maria was pronounced dead on arrival. At the time of Maria's death, the Chapman family was preparing to celebrate Caleb's high school graduation from Christ Presbyterian Academy and Emily's engagement just hours before the accident.

During the memorial service for Maria, the family expressed their faith in God and their love for one another. After Maria's accident, the Chapman family spoke publicly about their loss and the role which faith played in their healing. They have appeared on Good Morning America, Larry King Live, in People, The 700 Club, and Huckabee. Maria was buried in the flower girl dress that she was planning to wear to Emily's October wedding. The family put Maria's ballet shoes, her favorite doll, letters from her brothers and sisters, and other personal mementos to Maria in her coffin. During the funeral service, Will kept Maria's security blanket around his shoulders. Maria Sue is buried in Williamson Memorial Gardens in Franklin, Tennessee. Chapman's next album, Beauty Will Rise, is about Maria's death and its aftermath. Steven nearly quit his singing career due to Maria's death and he nearly chose to never sing "Cinderella” again, but soon realized that Maria would have wanted him to continue singing and to honor her memory by singing "Cinderella”. An investigation of Maria's death was performed by the Tennessee Highway Patrol. It was ruled as an accident and no charges were filed. In November 2009, a year after Maria died, Steven performed at a special concert at Harvest Christian Fellowship. Greg Laurie, the pastor of Harvest, suffered the loss of his own son, Christopher Laurie, just months after Steven's loss. Steven performed several songs from Beauty Will Rise.

Since Maria's unexpected death, Mary Beth Chapman has written and released a book about the death of her daughter called Choosing to SEE: A Journey of Struggle and Hope. Steven and Mary Beth later honored Maria's memory by starting Maria's Big House of Hope.

=== Honorary doctorate ===
On May 7, 2011, Steven Chapman received an honorary doctorate of music degree from Anderson University and was the commencement speaker for the class of 2011.

== Activism and charity work ==
In the late 1990s, Chapman became involved in youth violence prevention efforts following the 1997 Heath High School shooting at his alma mater in West Paducah. He dedicated a song, "With Hope", from his 1999 album, Speechless, to the families who lost someone in the shooting. In addition, he was asked to sing at the joint funeral held for the three victims. Chapman later gave a memorial concert and joined Charles Colson and others in creating a video designed to sensitize teenagers to the signs of serious violence planning among peers and to encourage them to report plans that are told to them.

In 2009, Show Hope finished building Maria's Big House of Hope, a medical care center in China that provides holistic care to orphans with special needs. Maria's Big House of Hope is also dedicated to the memory of the late Maria Sue Chunxi Chapman. Also in 2009, Steven Chapman and Mary Beth Chapman received the Children's Champion Award from the charitable organization Children's Hunger Fund for their work with Show Hope. In September 2011, Chapman and his wife were awarded the Congressional Angels in Adoption award by the Congressional Coalition on Adoption Institute (CCAI) in Washington, D.C.

Steven Chapman also has promoted the international charity World Vision for at least a decade, serving as spokesman for Project Restore, its program serving the U.S. Gulf Coast region in recovery from Hurricane Katrina, in cooperation with the Gospel Music Association. He has occasionally traveled to Uganda to help with the problem of street children, and to help orphans and adoption organizations. He has played at local churches, including KPC (Kampala Pentecostal Church) in Kampala, Uganda.

In 2020, Chapman was a featured guest at Keith & Kristyn Getty's Sing! Global 2020 Conference designed to train music leaders and instill the importance of solid doctrine and Gospel saturated lyrics in Christian music.

== Politics ==
During the 2016 presidential election, Chapman encouraged evangelical Christians to trust that "God is on the throne" and "resist the urge to argue and fight with each other about our opinions." After the 2021 United States Capitol attack on January 6, Chapman released "A Desperate Benediction" as a live, home-studio video to his Facebook page. In the prose that accompanied the posting he wrote, "now more than ever before, it seems like the soul of our world (& our nation) is aching, longing and desperate for peace."

== Discography ==
Chapman has released 23 studio albums, more than 25 albums total in his career, including 4 Christmas, 2 live, and several compilation albums. He has sold more than 11 million total albums (including two certified Platinum albums, eight certified Gold albums) and has had 49 No. 1 radio songs.

- First Hand (1987)
- Real Life Conversations (1988)
- More to This Life (1989)
- For the Sake of the Call (1990)
- The Great Adventure (1992)
- The Live Adventure (1993)
- Heaven in the Real World (1994)
- The Music of Christmas (1995)
- Signs of Life (1996)
- Speechless (1999)
- Declaration (2001)
- All About Love (2003)
- All Things New (2004)
- All I Really Want for Christmas (2005)
- This Moment (2007)
- Beauty Will Rise (2009)
- re:creation (2011)
- Joy (2012)
- Deep Roots (2013)
- The Glorious Unfolding (2013)
- Worship and Believe (2016)
- Deeper Roots: Where the Bluegrass Grows (2019)
- Still (2022)

== Awards ==
Awards and achievements
Preceded by Another Time... Another Place; Sandi Patti	Grammy Award for Best Pop/Contemporary Gospel Album; 1992–1994 For the Sake of the Call; The Great Adventure; The Live Adventure	Succeeded by Mercy; Andrae Crouch
Preceded by This Is My Song; Deniece Williams	Grammy Award for Best Pop/Contemporary Gospel Album; 2000 Speechless	Succeeded by If I Left the Zoo; Jars of Clay
Preceded by Worship Again; Michael W. Smith	Grammy Award for Best Pop/Contemporary Gospel Album; 2005 All Things New	Succeeded by Lifesong; Casting Crowns
Preceded by Avalon	American Music Award for Favorite Inspirational Contemporary Artist; 2003	Succeeded by MercyMe
Preceded by "Place in This World"; Amy Grant, Michael W. Smith, Wayne Kirkpatrick	GMA's Song of the Year; 1993 "The Great Adventure"	Succeeded by "In Christ Alone"; Shawn Craig, Don Koch
Preceded by Larnelle Harris	GMA's Songwriter of the Year; 1989–1995	Succeeded by Michael W. Smith
Preceded by Michael W. Smith	GMA's Songwriter of the Year; 1997–1998	Succeeded by Rich Mullins
Preceded by Wayne Watson	GMA's Male Vocalist of the Year; 1990–1991	Succeeded by Michael English
Preceded by Michael English	GMA's Male Vocalist of the Year; 1995	Succeeded by Gary Chapman
Preceded by Gary Chapman	GMA's Male Vocalist of the Year; 1997–1998	Succeeded by Chris Rice
Preceded by Chris Rice	GMA's Male Vocalist of the Year; 2000–2001	Succeeded by Mac Powell
Preceded by Amy Grant	GMA's Artist of the Year; 1990–1991	Succeeded by Amy Grant
Preceded by Amy Grant	GMA's Artist of the Year; 1993	Succeeded by Michael English
Preceded by Michael English	GMA's Artist of the Year; 1995	Succeeded by DC Talk
Preceded by DC Talk	GMA's Artist of the Year; 1997	Succeeded by Rich Mullins
Preceded by Michael W. Smith	GMA's Artist of the Year; 2000	Succeeded by Third Day
Preceded by tobyMac	GMA's Artist of the Year; 2009	Succeeded by
Preceded by Go West Young Man; Michael W. Smith	GMA's Pop/Contemporary Album of the Year; 1992–1993 For the Sake of the Call; The Great Adventure	Succeeded by Hope; Michael English
Preceded by Hope; Michael English	GMA's Pop/Contemporary Album of the Year; 1995 Heaven in the Real World	Succeeded by The Whole Truth; Point of Grace
Preceded by The Whole Truth; Point of Grace	GMA's Pop/Contemporary Album of the Year; 1997 Signs of Life	Succeeded by Behind the Eyes; Amy Grant
Preceded by Live the Life; Michael W. Smith	GMA's Pop/Contemporary Album of the Year; 2000 Speechless	Succeeded by This is Your Time; Michael W. Smith
Preceded by This is Your Time; Michael W. Smith	GMA's Pop/Contemporary Album of the Year; 2002 Declaration	Succeeded by Woven & Spun; Nichole Nordeman
Preceded by	GMA's Pop/Contemporary Recorded Song of the Year; 1989 "His Eyes"	Succeeded by "Heaven"; BeBe & CeCe Winans
Preceded by "Home Free"; Wayne Watson	GMA's Pop/Contemporary Recorded Song of the Year; 1993–1995 "The Great Adventure" (with Geoff Moore) "Go There With You" "Heaven in the Real World"	Succeeded by "The Great Divide"; Point of Grace
Preceded by "Between You and Me"; DC Talk	GMA's Pop/Contemporary Recorded Song of the Year; 1998 "Let Us Pray"	Succeeded by "Testify to Love"; Avalon
Preceded by "Testify To Love"; Avalon	GMA's Pop/Contemporary Recorded Song of the Year; 2000 "Dive"	Succeeded by "Redeemer"; Nicole C. Mullen
Preceded by	GMA's Inspirational Recorded Song of the Year; 1990 "His Strength is Perfect" (with Jerry Salley)	Succeeded by
Preceded by	GMA's Inspirational Recorded Song of the Year; 2005 "Voice of Truth" (with Mark Hall) (recorded by Casting Crowns)	Succeeded by
Preceded by	GMA's Instrumental Album of the Year; 2007 End of the Spear Soundtrack (with Ronald Owen, Howell Gibbens, Matt Cody, David Mullen, Jamie Moore, Brown Bannister, Otto Price)	Succeeded by
Preceded by	GMA's Praise and Worship Album of the Year; 1995 Corem Deo II (with Out of the Grey, Steve Green, Margaret Becker, Charlie Peacock, CeCe Winans, Bob Carlisle)	Succeeded by
Preceded by	GMA's Special Event Album of the Year; 1996 My Utmost for His Highest (with Amy Grant, Gary Chapman, Michael W. Smith, Point of Grace, 4HIM, Cindy Morgan, Sandi Patty, Bryan Duncan, Twila Paris, Phillips, Craig & Dean)	Succeeded by
Preceded by	GMA's Special Event Album of the Year; 1998 God with Us – A Celebration of Christmas Carols & Classics (with Anointed, Michael W. Smith, Twila Paris, Sandi Patty, Chris Willis, Steve Green, Cheri Keaggy, Avalon, Out of the Grey, Ray Boltz, Clay Crosse, CeCe Winans, Larnelle Harris)	Succeeded by
Preceded by	GMA's Special Event Album of the Year; 2005–2006 The Passion of the Christ: Songs; Music Inspired by The Chronicles of Narnia: The Lion, the Witch and the Wardrobe	Succeeded by
Preceded by	Short Form Music Video of the Year; 1993 "The Great Adventure"	Succeeded by
Preceded by	GMA's Long Form Music Video of the Year; 1994 The Live Adventure	Succeeded by
Preceded by	GMA's Long Form Music Video of the Year; 1999 My Utmost for His Highest: The Concert	Succeeded by
