= Jillian Edwards =

American singer-songwriter

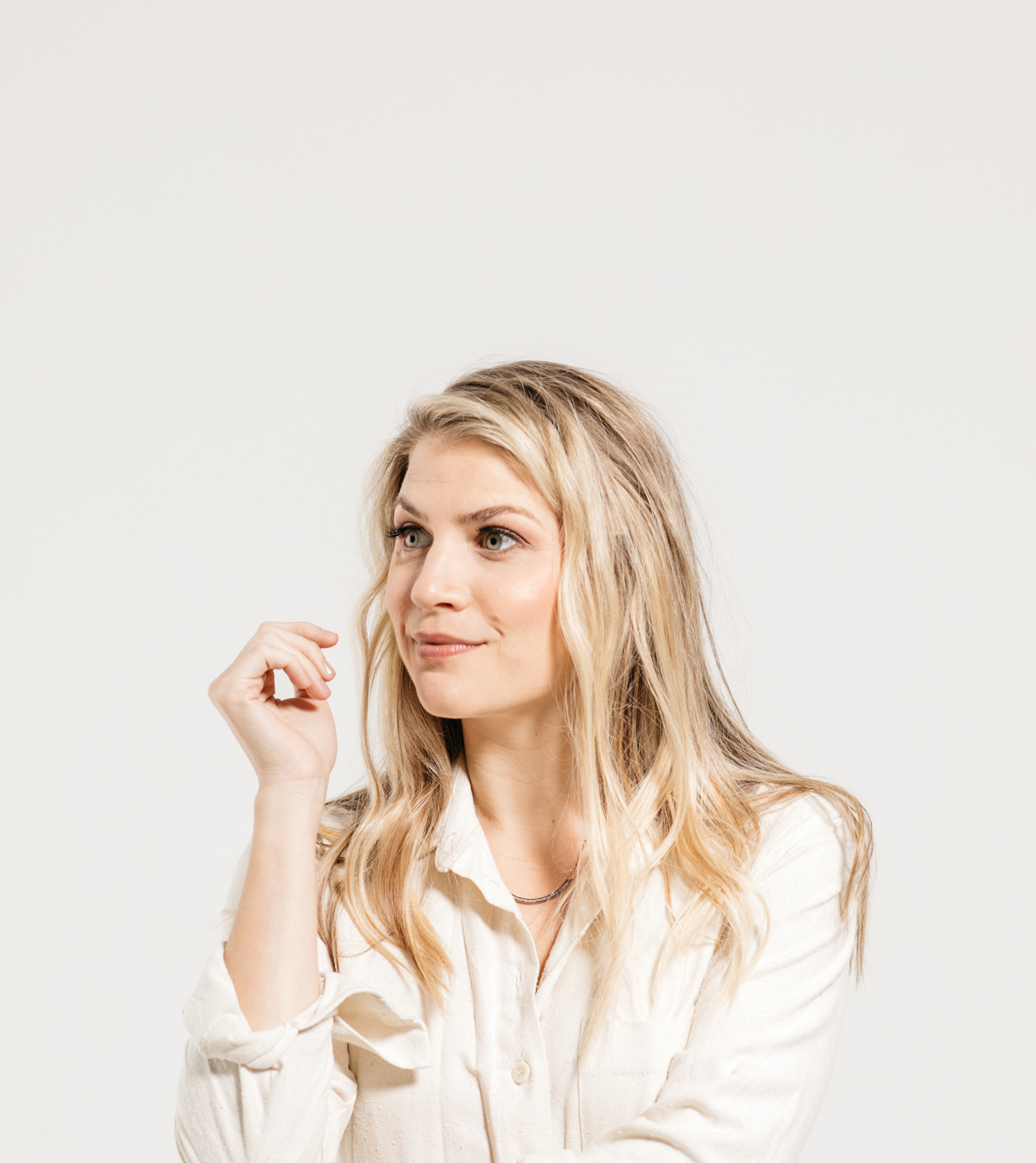
- Jillian Edwards, 2019

Background information
- Also known as: Jillian Chapman
- Born: Jillian Anita Edwards; Dallas, Texas. U.S.
- Origin: Richardson, Texas, U.S.
- Genres: CCM, folk, rock, alternative rock, folk rock, indie folk, indie pop, indie rock
- Occupations: Singer-songwriter; guitarist
- Instruments: Vocals, singer-songwriter, guitar
- Years active: 2009–present
- Website: jillianedwards.com

Jillian Anita Chapman, known professionally as Jillian Edwards, is an American singer-songwriter who primarily plays indie folk and indie pop. She has released five albums; Galaxies & Such in 2009, Headfirst in 2011, Daydream, All My Christmases in 2014, and Covers in 2016.

== Early life ==
Edwards was born in Dallas and grew up in Richardson, Texas. After graduating from Lloyd V. Berkner High School in Richardson, she attended Baylor University in Waco, Texas, where she learned and honed her craft by performing at local coffee shops.

== Career ==
Edwards' music recording career started in August 2009, with her self-released EP Galaxies & Such. Her next release, Headfirst, was released in November 2011. The project was her first to chart on Billboard, where it placed on five charts: The Billboard 200 at No. 187, Folk Albums at No. 6, Rock Albums at No. 32, Independent Albums at No. 28, and Heatseekers Albums at No. 2. In March 2014, she released the studio album Daydream with My Little Gypsy Records. The album was placed on three Billboard magazine charts, where it peaked at No. 6 on Folk Albums, No. 33 on Independent Albums, and No. 6 on Heatseekers Albums. She released a Christmas EP, All My Christmases, in November 2014, by My Little Gypsy Records. In July 2016, she started a campaign to crowdfund her next full-length project, an album of cover songs, through PledgeMusic.

The album, titled Covers, was fully funded and released in November 2016. It includes Edwards' own renditions of popular songs from various genres and eras such as "God Only Knows" by The Beach Boys, "No One" by Alicia Keys, "When a Man Loves a Woman" by Percy Sledge, and "I Want You to Want Me" by Cheap Trick. Edwards' cover of the Bright Eyes song "First Day of My Life" was used in a Citibank Citi Rewards+ Card credit card television advertising commercial which aired in the United States.

== Personal life ==
Edwards married Colony House drummer, Will Franklin Chapman, in December 2012. Chapman is the son of prominent Christian artist Steven Curtis Chapman. Will Chapman and Edwards have a daughter, Willow Faye, born in 2018. The family live in Nashville. They are Christians.

== Discography ==
List of musical works, with selected chart positions
Title	Album details	Peak chart positions				
Title	Album details	US	US FOLK	US HEAT	US INDIE	US ROCK
Galaxies & Such	Released: August 28, 2009; Label: Jillian Edwards; CD, digital download	—	—	—	—	—
Headfirst	Released: November 21, 2011; Label: Jillian Edwards; CD, digital download	187	6	2	28	32
Daydream	Released: March 11, 2014; Label: My Little Gypsy; CD, digital download	—	6	6	33	—
All My Christmases	Released: September 1, 2014; Label: My Little Gypsy; CD, digital download	—	—	—	—	—
Covers	Released: November 18, 2016; Label: My Little Gypsy; CD, digital download	—	—	—	—	—
