= Avalon: The Greatest Hits =

Greatest hits album by Avalon
- Released: February 10, 2009
- Recorded: 1996–2009
- Genres: Contemporary Christian music, inspirational
- Length: 73:29
- Label: Sparrow
- Producers: Brown Bannister, Charlie Peacock, Tedd Tjornhom, Shaun Shankel, Chris Harris

Avalon chronology
Another Time, Another Place: Timeless Christian Classics (2008)	Avalon: The Greatest Hits (2009)	Reborn (2009)

Professional ratings
Review scores
Source	Rating
Allmusic	4.5/5 stars

Avalon: The Greatest Hits (2009) is a greatest hits album by Contemporary Christian music vocal group Avalon. Titles appearing on the album include fan-favorites "Give It Up", "Adonai", "Can't Live A Day", "All", and "You Were There", as well as "Testify To Love", the latter of which became the longest-running No. 1 Adult Contemporary song in the history of the CCM Update AC chart. Also included is then-new recording and radio single, "Still My God". The song garnered immediate attention and success, eventually becoming Avalon's 21st career #1 radio hit. In addition, the song peaked at #2 on Radio & Records' Soft AC/Inspo chart.

== Content ==
Avalon: The Greatest Hits is the third greatest hits album released by Avalon alongside record label Sparrow Records, the first being 2003's offering Testify To Love: The Very Best Of Avalon. Avalon: The Greatest Hits marked the end of the quartet's career with Sparrow, fulfilling a contract that spanned over a decade. Despite this, the group soon after released a new, studio album on E1 Music, aptly titled Reborn, on September 15, 2009.

== Track listing ==
#	Title	Writer(s)	Original Album (Year)	Length
1.	"Testify to Love"	Paul Field, Henk Pool, Robert Riekerk, Ralph Van Manen	A Maze of Grace (1997)	4:45
2.	"Give It Up"	Mark Heimermann, Grant Cunningham, Rikk Kittleman, Michael Passons, Janna Long	Avalon (1996)	4:10
3.	"Knockin' on Heaven's Door"	Cunningham, Matt Huesmann	A Maze of Grace (1997)	3:39
4.	"Still My God"	Adam Smith, Stephan Sharp	New Recording	4:32
5.	"Take You at Your Word"	Field, Cunningham	In a Different Light (1999)	4:41
6.	"Can't Live a Day"	Joe Beck, Connie Harrington, Ty Lacy	In a Different Light (1999)	4:46
7.	"The Glory"	Jim Cooper, Regie Hamm	Oxygen (2001)	5:03
8.	"Wonder Why"	Cunningham, Huesmann	Oxygen (2001)	4:02
9.	"Adonai"	Don Koch, Lorraine Ferro, Stephanie Lewis	A Maze of Grace (1997)	4:01
10.	"New Day"	Long, Lydia Gott, Jody McBrayer, Tedd Tjornhom	Testify to Love: The Very Best of Avalon (2003)	3:26
11.	"Everything to Me"	Chad Cates, Sue Smith	Testify to Love: The Very Best of Avalon (2003)	4:48
12.	"I Don't Want to Go"	Jess Cates, Yancy Wideman	Oxygen (2001)	5:24
13.	"All"	Tjornhom, Ian Eskelin, Brian White	The Creed (2004)	3:47
14.	"You Were There"	Ben Glover	The Creed (2004)	6:52
15.	"Orphans of God"	Twila Lebar, Joel Lindsey	Stand (2006)	4:29
16.	"In Christ Alone"	Stuart Townend, Keith Getty	Faith: A Hymns Collection (2006)	5:04
