= O2: Avalon Remixed =

Remix album by Avalon
- Released: March 26, 2002
- Recorded: 1997–2002
- Genre: CCM, CEDM
- Length: 1:00:59
- Label: Sparrow
- Producer: Brown Bannister, Charlie Peacock

Avalon chronology
| Oxygen (2001) | O2: Avalon Remixed (2002) | Testify to Love: The Very Best of Avalon (2003) |

Singles from O2: Avalon Remixed
- 1. "Undeniably You (Jeff Savage Mix)" Released: November 15, 2002

O2: Avalon Remixed is Avalon's sixth release, the group's first remix album. Originally scheduled to be released concurrently with Oxygen, it was eventually released on March 26, 2002. The album contains 12 remixes of previous tracks that originally appeared on the albums A Maze of Grace (1997), In a Different Light (1999), and Oxygen (2001).

== Track listing ==
| No. | Title | Writer(s) | Remixer(s) | Length |
|---|---|---|---|---|
| 1. | "My Oxygen (Note: Original version from Oxygen.)" (Red Decibel mix) | Nik Kershaw; Richard Page | Adam Watts; Andy Dodd | 6:54 |
| 2. | "Testify to Love (Note: Original version from A Maze of Grace.)" (New Birth Mix) (featuring ZOEgirl) | Henk Pool; Paul Field; Ralph van Manen; Robert Riekerk | Andy Hunter; Tedd T | 7:13 |
| 3. | "Wonder Why" (Larring mix) | Grant Cunningham; Matt Huesmann | David Larring | 5:29 |
| 4. | "The Best Thing" (Euro Stack Mix) | Mark Pennells; Zarc Porter | Porter | 5:34 |
| 5. | "In Not Of (Note: Original version from In a Different Light.)" (Soul 2am Mix) | Cunningham; Nic Gonzales | Mooki | 3:42 |
| 6. | "Can't Live a Day" (DJ Tiësto mix) | Connie Harrington; Joe Beck; Ty Lacy | DJ Tiësto | 7:33 |
| 7. | "A Maze of Grace" (Ghost mix) (featuring The Katinas) | Charlie Peacock; Cunningham | Kene "Ghost" Bell | 5:04 |
| 8. | "Speed of Light" (Mint Royale mix) | Jody McBrayer; Kyle Matthews; Huesmann; Michael Passons | Mint Royale | 4:04 |
| 9. | "Undeniably You" (Jeff Savage mix) | Billy Chapin; Jim Cooper; Kevan Cyka; Tresa Jordan | Jeff Savage | 4:40 |
| 10. | "Make It Last Forever" (Millinneyum Mix) (featuring Out of Eden) | Jess Cates; Michael Linney | Linney | 2:57 |
| 11. | "Wonder Why" (Roswell Mix) | Cunningham; Huesmann | The-Conspiracy | 4:06 |
| 12. | "A Maze of Grace" (The J. Edgar Hoover Mix) | Peacock; Cunningham | The-Conspiracy | 3:43 |
