= Oxygen (Avalon album) =

Studio album by Avalon
- Released: May 22, 2001
- Recorded: 2000
- Genres: CCM, inspirational
- Length: 54:10
- Label: Sparrow
- Producer: Brown Bannister

Avalon chronology
Joy: A Christmas Collection (2000)	Oxygen (2001)	O2: Avalon Remixed (2002)

Singles from Oxygen
- 1. "The Glory" Released: June 4, 2001; 2. "Make It Last Forever" Released: June 4, 2001; 3. "Wonder Why" Released: June 2001; 4. "Come and Fill My Heart" Released: July 1, 2001; 5. "I Don't Want to Go" Released: 2002; 6. "Undeniably You" Released: November 15, 2002

Professional ratings
Review scores
Source	Rating
AllMusic	3/5 stars

Oxygen is Avalon's fifth studio album, released on May 22, 2001, and produced by Brown Bannister. The album included six singles that reached #1 on Christian adult contemporary or Christian contemporary hit radio, the most of any Avalon album to date.

A collector's edition of the album was released, including one bonus track, "Beyond the Clouds."

== Track listing ==
Standard edition
No.	Title	Writer(s)	Lead vocals	Length
1.	"Wonder Why"	Grant Cunningham; Matt Huesmann	Janna, Jody	4:00
2.	"The Best Thing"	Mark Pennells; Zarc Porter	Michael, Cherie	4:55
3.	"By Heart, By Soul" (featuring Aaron Neville)	Stephanie Lewis; Phil Silas	All	4:08
4.	"Undeniably You"	Billy Chapin; Jim Cooper; Kevan Cyka; Tresa Jordan	Cherie	3:57
5.	"I Don't Want to Go"	Jess Cates; Yancy	Janna	5:25
6.	"Never Givin' Up"	Tommy Collier; Scott Faircloff; Jordan	All	4:26
7.	"Make It Last Forever"	Cates; Michael Linney	Michael, Jody, Cherie	3:23
8.	"The Glory"	Cooper; Regie Hamm	Jody, Cherie	5:02
9.	"My Oxygen"	Nik Kershaw; Richard Page	Michael, Janna	4:53
10.	"Love Remains"	Randy Goodrum; Rob Mathes	Jody	4:31
11.	"Come and Fill My Heart"	Cunningham; Huesmann	Michael	5:09

Collector's edition bonus track
No.	Title	Writer(s)	Lead vocals	Length
12.	"Beyond the Clouds"	Steve Siler; Dan Muckala	Janna, Cherie	4:22

== Personnel ==
- Avalon – vocals
  - Janna Long
  - Jody McBrayer
  - Cherie Adams
  - Michael Passons

Musicians

- Dan Needham – programming (1), synthesizers (4)
- Dan Muckala – programming (2, 3, 6, 7, 10)
- Blair Masters – synthesizers (2, 5), acoustic piano (5), keyboards (6, 9), additional keyboards (10)
- Jeff Savage – programming (4, 7)
- Bernie Herms – programming (5, 11)
- Alan Pasqua – keyboards (6, 8, 9)
- Phil Madeira – Hammond B3 organ (11)
- Chris Rodriguez – electric guitar (1, 3, 4), BGV arrangements (1), acoustic guitar (4, 10)
- Jerry McPherson – electric guitar (2, 6, 11), guitars (5, 10)
- Michael Thompson – electric guitar (3, 6–9), acoustic guitar (9)
- Tim Pierce – electric guitar (6–9), mandolin (8)
- Leland Sklar – bass (6, 8, 9)
- Steve Brewster – drums (5)
- Neal Wilkinson – drums (6, 8, 9)
- Chris McHugh – drums (11)
- Eric Darken – percussion (1, 2, 5)
- Luis Conte – percussion (6, 9)
- Patrick Kiernan – violin (7)
- Michael Mellett – BGV arrangements (1, 2, 4, 10)
- Carl Marsh – string arrangements (5, 11)
- Gavyn Wright – concertmaster (5, 11), violin (7)
- The London Session Orchestra – strings (5, 11)

=== Production ===
- Grant Cunningham – executive producer
- Brown Bannister – producer
- Michael Mellett – vocal production (1, 2)
- Steve Bishir – recording, mixing
- Bill Deaton – additional engineer
- Patrick Kelly – additional engineer
- Russ Long – additional engineer
- Hank Nirider – mix assistant
- Jonathan Allen – strings recording (5, 11)
- Andrew Dudman – strings recording assistant (5, 11)
- Fred Paragano – digital editing
- Steve Hall – mastering
- Traci Bishir – production coordinator
- Michelle Bentrem – production coordinating assistant
- Christiév Carothers – creative direction
- Jan Cook – art direction
- Dan Harding – art direction, design
- Matthew Barnes – photography
- Gino Tanabe – stylist
- Sheila Davis – grooming, make-up
- Marybeth Felts – grooming, make-up
- Brady Wardlaw – grooming, make-up
- Proper Management – management

=== Studios ===
- Recorded at The Sound Kitchen (Franklin, Tennessee)
- Strings recorded at Abbey Road Studios (London, England)
- Tracks 1 & 2 mixed at Seventeen Grand Studio (Nashville, Tennessee)
- Tracks 3–11 mixed at The Sound Kitchen
- Mastered at Future Disc (Hollywood, California)

== Release and promotion ==
=== Radio ===
Oxygen was successful on Christian radio, with all of its singles reaching #1. "The Glory," the album's first Christian adult contemporary single, was added by all 41 reporting stations its debut week. "Make It Last Forever," released simultaneously to Christian contemporary hit radio (CHR), received an initial 14 adds out of 19 reporting stations.

=== Sales ===
Oxygen sold more than 33,400 copies its first week of release, debuting at #37 on the Billboard 200 and reached #1 on Billboard's Christian albums chart. Both chart positions represent the highest performances on their respective charts in the group's career.

=== Limited edition single ===
A CD single containing four tracks was released at Christian retail as a free bonus to customers who pre-ordered the album. The single included the album's first two singles, "The Glory" (in its radio version) and "Make It Last Forever"; "Fly to You," from the 1999 film Jesus, also presented in its radio version; and a live version of "Testify to Love" from the group's second album, A Maze of Grace.

Track listing
No.	Title	Writer(s)	Length
1.	"The Glory" (radio version)	Jim Cooper; Regie Hamm	4:19
2.	"Make It Last Forever"	Jess Cates; Michael Linney	3:26
3.	"Fly to You" (radio version)	Grant Cunningham; Matt Huesmann	3:52
4.	"Testify to Love" (live)	Henk Pool; Paul Field; Ralph van Manen; Robert Riekerk	5:22
