= Another Time, Another Place EP =

EP by Avalon
- Released: November 13, 2007
- Genre: CCM, Inspirational
- Length: 14:48
- Label: Sparrow Records

Another Time, Another Place EP is Avalon's third EP release. It contains three songs that would be included in Another Time, Another Place: Timeless Christian Classics.

== Track listing ==
No.	Title	Length
1.	"Another Time, Another Place"	5:29
2.	"God Is in Control"	5:19
3.	"Thy Word"	3:59
Total length:		14:48

== Lineup of Members ==
- Jody McBrayer
- Janna Long
- Melissa Greene
- Greg Long
