= Another Time, Another Place: Timeless Christian Classics =

Studio album by Avalon
- Released: February 26, 2008
- Recorded: 2007
- Genre: Inspirational
- Length: 66:41
- Label: Sparrow
- Producer: Shaun Shankel, Mark Hammond

Avalon chronology
Faith: A Hymns Collection (2006)	Another Time, Another Place: Timeless Christian Classics (2008)	Avalon: The Greatest Hits (2009)

Another Time, Another Place: Timeless Christian Classics is Avalon's eleventh release and their eighth studio album. it contains remakes of classic songs that have defined and shaped the sound of Contemporary Christian Music. It was released on February 26, 2008 and was thought to be the final album featuring Jody McBrayer as a member of Avalon until he rejoined the group in 2018.

== Track listing ==
Track length, original recording artist and lead vocalists on current track are mentioned. If all four members of Avalon sing lead, the order in which they appear is listed.

1. "God Is in Control" – 5:21

Originally recorded by Twila Paris
Lead vocal: Janna, Melissa

2. "For the Sake of the Call" – 4:56

Originally recorded by Steven Curtis Chapman
Lead vocal: Greg, Melissa, Jody, Janna

3. "Thy Word" – 3:58

Originally recorded by Amy Grant
Lead vocal: Jody, Janna, Greg, Melissa

4. "Another Time, Another Place" – 5:29

Originally recorded by Sandi Patty and Wayne Watson
Lead vocal: Janna, Jody

5. "Solid Is the Rock" – 3:45

Originally recorded by Michael English
Lead vocal: Jody, Greg

6. "People Get Ready... Jesus Is Comin'" – 4:22

Originally recorded by Crystal Lewis
Lead vocal: Janna, Jody

7. "The Basics of Life" – 5:12

Originally recorded by 4Him
Lead vocal: Janna, Melissa

8. "We Will Stand" – 4:10

Originally recorded by Russ Taff
Featuring guest vocals by Russ Taff
Originally released as a track on Stand.
Lead vocal: Russ Taff, Jody, Janna, Greg, Melissa

9. "The Reason We Sing" – 3:25

Originally recorded by First Call
Lead vocal: Janna, Melissa

10. "Friend of a Wounded Heart" – 4:35

Originally recorded by Wayne Watson
Lead vocal: Janna, Jody, Greg, Melissa

11. "El-Shaddai" – 3:50

Originally recorded by Amy Grant
Lead vocal: Jody, Melissa

12. "Place in This World" – 3:43

Originally recorded by Michael W. Smith
Lead vocal: Greg, Janna, Jody, Melissa

13. "Addictive Love" – 4:37

Originally recorded by BeBe & CeCe Winans
Lead vocal: Jody, Janna

14. "People Need the Lord" – 4:39

Originally recorded by Steve Green
Lead vocal: Jody, Melissa, Greg, Janna

15. "Testify to Love" – 4:40

Originally recorded by Avalon
Re-recorded with a brand new arrangement for this release.
Lead vocal: Jody, Greg

16. "Praise the Lord" – 3:27

Originally recorded by The Imperials
Bonus track available online only with purchase of album.
Lead vocal: Greg, Melissa

== Personnel ==
Avalon

- Janna Long – vocals
- Jody McBrayer – vocals
- Melissa Greene – vocals
- Greg Long – vocals

Musicians

- Sam Mizell – acoustic piano, programming, arrangements
- Shaun Shankel – programming, arrangements, string arrangements
- Mark Hammond – programming, drums, string arrangements
- Rob Hawkins – programming, guitars
- Greg Hagan – guitars
- David May – guitars
- Paul Moak – guitars
- Mark Hill – bass
- Adam Nitti – bass
- Jackie Street – bass
- Dan Needham – drums
- David Davidson – strings
- David Hamilton – string arrangements
- Russ Taff – vocals (8)

Choir

- Alexia Counce
- Vicki Dvoracek
- Maribeth Johnson
- Shelly Johnson
- Dennis Morgan
- Tami Pryce

== Radio singles ==
- "God Is In Control"
- "Another Time, Another Place"
- "We Will Stand"
