= Joy: A Christmas Collection =

Studio album by Avalon
- Released: September 26, 2000
- Recorded: 1999
- Genre: CCM, Christmas
- Length: 47:35
- Label: Sparrow
- Producer: Brown Bannister

Avalon chronology
In a Different Light (1999)	Joy: A Christmas Collection (2000)	Oxygen (2001)

Professional ratings
Review scores
Source	Rating
Allmusic	4/5 stars

Joy: A Christmas Collection (2000) is Avalon's fourth release, and their first Christmas album. In addition to standard Christmas songs, the album also includes covers of Celine Dion's "Don't Save It All for Christmas Day", Mariah Carey's "Jesus, Born on This Day", and David Meece's "We Are The Reason".

== Track listing ==
1. "Joy (to the World)" (Brown Bannister, Grant Cunningham, Dan Muckala) – 4:32; All split lead
2. "The Angels Medley ("The First Noel" / "Angels We Have Heard on High" / "Hark! The Herald Angels Sing")" – 6:03; All split lead, with Michael singing lead predominantly
3. "Don't Save It All for Christmas Day" (Celine Dion, Ric Wake, Peter Zizzo) – 4:43; Sung by Jody
4. "Jesus, Born on This Day" (Walter Afanasieff, Mariah Carey) – 4:25; Sung by Cherie
5. "Winter Wonderland" – 2:41
6. "Light a Candle" (Wayne Haun, Joel Lindsey) – 3:42; Sung by Cherie and Janna, with Michael and Jody on the bridge
7. "Good News" (Rob Mathes, Michelle Shocked) – 6:01; Sung by Michael and Jody
8. "The Christmas Song" – 4:46; Sung by Janna
9. "Manger Medley ("O Come, O Come, Emmanuel" / "Away in a Manger" / "O Little Town of Bethlehem" / "Silent Night")" – 5:48; All split lead
10. "We are the Reason" (David Meece) – 5:00; Sung by Michael and Janna

== Personnel ==
- Janna Long – vocals
- Jody McBrayer – vocals
- Cherie Adams – vocals
- Michael Passons – vocals

== Radio Singles ==
- Don't Save It All For Christmas Day
- Light a Candle
- We Are the Reason
- Jesus, Born On This Day
