= In a Different Light (Avalon album) =

Studio album by Avalon
- Released: March 23, 1999
- Recorded: 1998
- Genre: Inspirational
- Length: 50:26
- Label: Sparrow
- Producer: Brown Bannister

Avalon chronology
A Maze of Grace (1997)	In a Different Light (1999)	Joy: A Christmas Collection (2000)

Singles from In a Different Light
- 1. "In Not Of" Released: March 1, 1999; 2. "Take You at Your Word" Released: June 21, 1999; 3. "Can't Live a Day" Released: September 27, 1999; 4. "Always Have, Always Will" Released: February 14, 2000

Professional ratings
Review scores
Source	Rating
AllMusic	4.5/5 stars

In a Different Light is Avalon's third studio album, released on March 23, 1999. It is the first album with group member Cherie Adams, who replaced Nikki Hassman-Anders. This is Avalon's second album to be certified Gold by the RIAA. The project was an instant hit at Christian radio, containing four No. 1 singles: "Can't Live A Day", "Take You At Your Word", "In Not Of", and "Always Have, Always Will". It debuted and peaked on the Billboard 200 chart at #81 for the week of April 10, 1999, spending a total of 13 weeks on that specific chart.

== Track listing ==
No.	Title	Writer(s)	Length
1.	"Take You at Your Word"	Grant Cunningham; Paul Field	4:46
2.	"In Not Of"	Cunningham; Nic Gonzales	4:04
3.	"In a Different Light"	Avalon; Matt Huesmann	3:25
4.	"Can't Live a Day"	Joe Beck; Connie Harrington; Ty Lacy	4:47
5.	"Always Have, Always Will"	Cunningham; Gonzales; Toby McKeehan	4:18
6.	"I'm Speechless"	Lacy; Joanna Carlson	5:06
7.	"If My People Pray"	Huesmann; Kent Hooper; Douglas McKelvey	5:04
8.	"Only for the Weak"	Scott Krippayne; Michael Puryear; Doak Snead	4:47
9.	"Let Your Love"	Gayla Borders; Jeff Borders; Phil Madeira	4:03
10.	"Hide My Soul"	Chris Eaton; Sheila Walsh	5:33
11.	"First Love"	Henk Pool; Sam Scott; Lee Ann Vermeulen	4:33

== Personnel ==
Credits adapted from In a Different Light liner notes.

- Avalon – Vocals
  - Janna Long
  - Jody McBrayer
  - Cherie Paliotta
  - Michael Passons
- Adam Anders – Bass (3, 10)
- George Cocchini – Guitar (2, 5)
- Eric Darken – Percussion (4, 5)
- Scott Denté – Acoustic guitar (6–8)
- Chris Eaton – Vocal arrangement (3, 5, 6)
- Chris Harris – Vocal arrangement (1, 2)
- Matt Huesmann – Additional keyboards (3)
- Gordon Kennedy – Guitar (2–5, 8)
- Kip Kubin – Programming (3, 7, 9)
- Phil Madeira – Hammond B-3 (5, 8)
- Carl Marsh – String arrangement (4, 8)
- Blair Masters – Additional keyboards (4, 5)
- Chris McHugh – Drums (2, 3, 5)
- Jerry McPherson – Electric guitar (4–8, 11)
- Michael Mellett – Vocal arrangement (4, 5, 7, 9–11)
- Tony Miracle – Programming (1–11), guitar (1, 9)
- The Nashville String Machine – Strings (4, 8)
  - Carl Gorodetzky – Conductor
- Dan Needham – Drums (4)
- Jimmie Lee Sloas – Bass (5)

Choir ("Only for the Weak"):

- Stacie Vining
- Curt Sanders
- Matthew Barnes
- Shelly Justice
- Delores Cox
- Stephanie Harrison
- Chad Dickerson
- Jennifer Thune
- Steven Skeen
- Grant Cunningham
- Stacey Jennette
- Greg Long
