= The Creed (album) =

Studio album by Avalon
- Released: February 24, 2004
- Recorded: 2003
- Genre: CCM, Inspirational
- Length: 42:12
- Label: Sparrow
- Producer: Brown Bannister, Charlie Peacock, Tedd Tjornhom

Avalon chronology
Testify to Love: The Very Best of Avalon (2003)	The Creed (2004)	Stand (2006)

Professional ratings
Review scores
Source	Rating
AllMusic	3/5 stars

The Creed is the eighth album released by Christian vocal group Avalon, and their fifth studio project. It is the first Avalon album to include Greg Long (group member Janna Long's husband), who replaced Michael Passons after his unexpected departure in mid-2003. The Creed debuted and peaked at #104 on the Billboard 200 chart for the week of March 13, 2004, and to date has spent a total of eight weeks there. It also made an appearance on Billboard's Christian Albums chart, reaching its highest ranking at #4, also for the week of March 13, 2004. On the Christian Albums chart, it spent a total of nineteen weeks. The project was unable to produce a No. 1 radio single, a rare occurrence in the group's successful career. However, lead single "All" managed to peak at #2 on Radio & Records' Christian AC chart and spent a total of eight weeks in the chart's top five. It also made chart positions in all three major Christian formats—AC, CHR, and Inspirational. The Creed contains the track "Overjoyed", lifted from Janna Long's self-titled solo album.

== Track listing ==
1. "All" – 3:46; Sung by Janna and Melissa (writers: Ian Eskelin, Brian White, Tedd Tjornhom)
2. "The Creed" – 4:56; All split lead (Greg and Jody are most predominant) (writers: Matt Huesmann, Chris Davis, Cindy Morgan, Michael Passons)
3. "Abundantly" – 3:56; Sung by Janna (writers: Joe Beck, Janna Long, Sam Mizell, Brian White)
4. "I Wanna Be with You" – 4:05; Sung by Greg (writers: Will Owsley, Dillon O'Brian, Keith Thomas)
5. "You Were There" – 6:53; Sung by Jody (writer: Ben Glover)
6. "Far Away from Here" – 4:38; Sung by Melissa and Jody (writers: Jason Barton, Howie Dorough, Dan Muckala)
7. "Overjoyed" – 4:03; Sung by Janna (writers: Kevan Cyka, Stephanie Lewis)
8. "I Bring It to You" – 3:49; Sung by Melissa (writers: Phil Barnhart, Kevin Page, Bob Raglan)
9. "The Good Way" – 3:23; Sung by Janna and Melissa (writers: Damon Riley, Melissa Greene, Janna Long, Cindy Morgan)
10. "Renew Me" – 4:43; Sung by Janna, Melissa and Jody; (writers: Bernie Herms, Stephanie Lewis)

== Personnel ==
Avalon

- Janna Long – vocals
- Jody McBrayer – vocals
- Melissa Greene – vocals
- Greg Long– vocals

Musicians

- Damon Riley – programming (1, 7, 9)
- Tedd T. – programming (1, 9), additional programming (7), electric guitar (7, 9)
- Rusty Varenkamp – programming (1), additional programming (7)
- Dan Muckala – programming (2, 3, 5), additional keyboards (4), string arrangements (6)
- Blair Masters – programming (3)
- Robert Marvin – programming (4)
- Dan Needham – programming (8)
- Bernie Herms – programming (10), original arrangements (10), string arrangements (10)
- Paul Moak – electric guitar (1, 7, 9)
- Allen Salmon – acoustic guitar (1), electric guitar (1)
- Chuck Zwicky – electric guitar (1)
- Gordon Kennedy – acoustic guitar (2), electric guitar (2, 3, 5)
- Will Owsley – guitar (4)
- Alex Nifong – acoustic guitar (5)
- Michael Ripoll – gut string guitar (5), acoustic guitar (7)
- Jerry McPherson – electric guitar (6, 10)
- Dave Ripoll – gut string guitar (10)
- Jimmie Lee Sloas – bass (2–5, 8)
- Mark Hill – bass (6, 10)
- Steve Brewster – drums (2, 3, 5, 8)
- John Hammond – drums (6, 10)
- Ben Phillips – drums (9)
- Eric Darken – percussion (3)
- Michael Mellett – vocal arrangements (1–10)
- Carl Marsh – string arrangements and conductor (2, 5)
- Gavyn Wright – concertmaster (2, 5)
- Charlie Peacock – string arrangements (6), acoustic piano (10)
- David Davidson – string arrangements (10)
- The London Session Orchestra – strings (2, 5)
- The Love Sponge Strings – strings (6, 10):
  - David Angell
  - Monisa Angell
  - David Davidson
  - Anthony LaMarchina
  - Mary Kathryn Vanosdale
  - Kristin Wilkinson

=== Production ===
- Producers – Brown Bannister (Tracks 1–10); Tedd T. (Tracks 1, 7 & 9); Charlie Peacock (Tracks 6 & 10).
- Executive Producer – Brad O'Donnell
- Recording Engineers – Steve Bishir (Tracks 1–5 & 8); Damon Riley and Tedd T. (Tracks 1, 7 & 9); Richie Biggs (Tracks 6 & 10).
- Assistant Engineers – Hank Nirider (Tracks 2–5 & 8); Kevin Pickle (Tracks 6 & 10).
- Strings on Tracks 2, 5, 6 & 10 recorded by Steve Bishir, assisted by Rupert Coulson.
- Drum recording on Track 9 – Allen Salmon
- Mixing – Chris Lord-Alge (Tracks 1, 2 & 3); Steve Bishir (Tracks 4 & 8); F. Reid Shippen (Track 5); David Thoener (Tracks 6 & 10); Tedd T. and Chuck Zwicky (Tracks 7 & 9).
- Mix Assistants – Keith Armstrong (Tracks 1, 2 & 3); Jesse Benfield (Tracks 6 & 10).
- Digital Editing – Kevin B. Hipp and Hank Nirider (Tracks 1–6, 8 & 10); Tedd T. and Rusty Varenkamp (Tracks 1, 7 & 9); Damon Riley and Allen Salmon (Tracks 7 & 9).
- Mastered by Tom Coyne at Sterling Sound (New York, NY).
- Art Direction and Design – Julian Peploe
- Photography – Andrew Southam

== Radio Singles ==
- All
- I Wanna Be With You
- You Were There
