= Faith: A Hymns Collection =

Studio album by Avalon
- Released: October 17, 2006
- Recorded: 2006
- Genre: Inspirational
- Length: 54:49
- Label: Sparrow
- Producers: Brown Bannister, Shaun Shankel

Avalon chronology
Stand (2006)	Faith: A Hymns Collection (2006)	Another Time, Another Place: Timeless Christian Classics (2008)

Faith: A Hymns Collection is Avalon's tenth release and their seventh studio album. Their first worship album, it contains remakes of old and modern hymns. It was released on October 17, 2006.

== Track listing ==
1. "The Solid Rock" – 4:12; No lead
2. "Joyful, Joyful We Adore Thee" – 3:44; No lead
3. "Great Is Thy Faithfulness" – 4:04; Lead: Janna and Melissa
4. "In Christ Alone" – 5:04; Lead: Janna (Greg chimes in on v. 2)
5. "It Is Well with My Soul" – 4:54; Lead: Jody
6. "I'll Fly Away" – 4:08; Lead: Janna
7. "Holy! Holy! Holy!" – 1:04; No lead
8. "Blessed Assurance" – 4:03; No lead
9. "Jesus Medley: "Jesus Loves Me" / "'Tis So Sweet to Trust in Jesus"" – 5:20; Lead: Jody and Janna ("Jesus Loves Me"), Greg and Melissa ("'Tis So Sweet to Trust in Jesus")
10. "How Great Thou Art" – 4:51; Lead: Jody and Greg
11. "Amazing Grace" – 4:58; Lead: Jody and Greg
12. "Total Praise" – 3:55; Lead: Melissa and Jody
13. "For Freedom" (Bonus track) – 4:25

== Personnel ==
Avalon

- Janna Long – vocals
- Jody McBrayer – vocals
- Melissa Greene – vocals
- Greg Long – vocals

Musicians

- Blair Masters – Fender Rhodes, keyboards and programming (1, 3–12), acoustic piano (5)
- Pat Coil – acoustic piano (1, 3, 4, 6–12), Hammond B3 organ (1–12)
- John Hobbs – acoustic piano (2), keyboards (2), programming (2)
- Jamie Kenney – acoustic piano (13), programming (13)
- Shaun Shankel – programming (13)
- John Willis – acoustic guitar (1, 2, 3, 5–12)
- David Cleveland – electric guitar, bouzouki, mandolin, acoustic guitar (4)
- Chuck Butler – electric guitar
- Adam Lester – electric guitar
- Jerry McPherson – electric guitar
- Matt Pierson – bass (1, 3–10, 12)
- Adam Nitti – bass (2)
- Joey Canaday – bass (11)
- Steve Brewster – drums (1, 3–12)
- Dan Needham – drums (2)
- Eric Darken – percussion (1–8, 10–12)
- Tommy Sims – percussion (9)
- John Catchings – cello
- David Davidson – strings (13)
- Michael Mellett – vocal arrangements

== Production ==
- Producers – Brown Bannister (Tracks 1–12); Shaun Shankel (Track 13).
- Executive Producer – Brad O'Donnell
- Additional Vocal Production on Tracks 1–12 – Michael Mellett
- Recording Engineers – Steve Bishir (Tracks 1–12); Jamie Kenney and Shaun Shankel (Track 13).
- Additional Engineers on Tracks 1–12 – Brown Bannister, Aaron Sternke and Billy Whittington.
- Assistant Engineers on Tracks 1–12 – Jason Lefan and Joe Roberts
- Recorded at The Tracking Room, Platinum Lab and The Lealand Room (Nashville, TN).
- Overdubbed at Oxford Sound (Nashville, TN) and First Avenue Sound (Franklin, TN).
- Mixing – Steve Bishir (Tracks 1–12); F. Reid Shippen (Track 13).
- Mix Assistant on Track 13 – Lee Bridges
- Mixed at Sound Stage Studios (Nashville, TN).
- Tracks 1–12 mastered by Tom Coyne at Sterling Sound (New York, NY).
- Track 13 mastered by Andrew Mendelson at Georgetown Masters (Nashville, TN).
- A&R Administration – Jess Chambers
- Creative Director – Ian Cook
- Art Direction – Tim Frank
- Design – Torne White
- Photography – Robert Ascroft (band) and Torne White (cover)

== Radio Singles ==
- In Christ Alone
