= Avalon (Avalon album) =

Studio album by Avalon
- Released: December 26, 1996
- Recorded: 1996
- Studio: re:Think Studio, Javelina Recording Studio, Sound Stage Studios and October Studio (Nashville, Tennessee)
- Genre: Inspirational, Christian pop
- Length: 42:49
- Label: Sparrow
- Producer: Charlie Peacock

Avalon chronology
Avalon (1996)	A Maze of Grace (1997)

Professional ratings
Review scores
Source	Rating
Allmusic	2.5/5 stars

Avalon is Avalon's first studio album, released in December 1996 on Sparrow Records. It includes a cover of the hymn "My Jesus, I Love Thee" and the Andrae Crouch song "Jesus Is Lord". Produced by Charlie Peacock, Avalon catapulted the smooth quartet into the Christian music scene, with four No. 1 radio hits and a Dove Award from the Gospel Music Association in 1998 for "New Artist of the Year".

== Track listing ==
No.	Title	Writer(s)	Lead vocals	Length
1.	"Give It Up"	Avalon; Mark Heimermann; Rikk Kittlemann	All	4:15
2.	"This Love"	Charlie Peacock; Chris Rodriguez	All	3:36
3.	"The Greatest Story"	Peacock; Douglas Kaine McKelvey	Nikki, Jody	4:55
4.	"Picture Perfect World"	Peacock; Grant Cunningham	All	4:38
5.	"Don't Be Afraid"	Tabitha Fair; Dennis Matkosky; Madeline Stone	Nikki, Jody	4:36
6.	"Here to Deliver"	Peacock; Rodriguez	Jody	3:26
7.	"Let It Be Forever"	Peacock; McKelvey	Janna	4:45
8.	"My Jesus, I Love Thee"	William Ralph Featherston; Adoniram Judson Gordon	Michael, Nikki	3:26
9.	"Saviour Love"	Michael Passons; Fair; Kittlemann	Michael	4:22
10.	"Jesus Is Lord"	Andraé Crouch	All	4:50

== Personnel ==
Avalon

- Janna Long – vocals
- Jody McBrayer – vocals
- Nikki Hassman-Anders – vocals
- Michael Passons – vocals

Musicians

- Tony Miracle – keyboards (1–7), programming (1–7)
- Charlie Peacock – keyboards (2–7), programming (2–7)
- Pat Coil – keyboards (3, 5, 9), acoustic piano (4), programming (5)
- Tim Lauer – Hammond B3 organ (6, 7, 10)
- Rob Mathes – keyboards (8), arrangements (8)
- Tim Akers – acoustic piano (10), clavinet (10)
- Jerry McPherson – electric guitar (1–7, 9, 10), acoustic guitar (1, 6)
- Mark Baldwin – acoustic guitar (4)
- Scott Denté – acoustic guitar (7)
- Mark Hill – bass (3, 5, 9, 10)
- Jimmie Lee Sloas – bass (4)
- Brent Milligan – bass (6)
- Chris McHugh – drums (2–4, 6, 10)
- Steve Brewster – drums (5, 6, 9), drum programming (9)
- Eric Darken – percussion (6, 10)
- Mark Douthit – horns (10)
- Mike Haynes – horns (10)
- Tom Howard – string arrangements and conductor (3–5, 7)
- The Nashville String Machine – strings (3–5, 7)

== Production ==
- Grant Cunningham – A&R direction
- Charlie Peacock – producer
- Shane D. Wilson – recording, mixing (8)
- Rick Will – mixing (1, 4, 6, 9, 10)
- Tom Laune – mixing (2, 3, 5, 7)
- Chad Fifield – recording assistant
- Joe Hayden – recording assistant
- Mel Jones – recording assistant
- Richard Rose – recording assistant
- Chris Schara – recording assistant
- Graham Lewis – mix assistant (1, 4)
- Booch Skidmore – mix assistant (2, 5–7, 9, 10)
- Tony Green – mix assistant (3)
- Katy Krippaehne – production coordinator
- Andi Ashworth – budget administrator
- Sheri Halford – art direction
- Joyce Revoir – design
- Bruce Ellefson – additional design
- Andrew Martin – photography

== Radio Singles ==
- Give It Up+
- The Greatest Story+
- Picture Perfect World+
- Saviour Love
- This Love+

+ Denotes #1 Radio Hit
