= Truth (American band) =

American CCM group (1971–2001)

- Origin: Mobile, Alabama, U.S.
- Genres: Contemporary Christian
- Instrument: Voice
- Years active: 1971–2001
- Labels: Impact, Paragon, Benson, Integrity Music, Pamplin Music

Truth was an American Contemporary Christian group, active from 1971 to 2001. Formed by John Roger Breland (Roger Breland), a professor at the University of Mobile in Mobile, Alabama, the ensemble's name stands for "Trust, Receive, Unchangeable, True Happiness [in Jesus]". It was initially composed of some 15 members who toured extensively year-round, eventually frequently recording as well. It expanded to 22 members and continued touring regularly for thirty years, dissolving in 2001. In 2000, the group was inducted into the Gospel Music Hall of Fame.

== Beginnings ==
The youth choir at Spring Hill Baptist Church in Mobile, grew over the course of two years from eight youth choir members to 140 members. Fueled by the inspiration of new Christian contemporary music which was sweeping the country, Breland began laying the groundwork for a new touring ensemble with vocals and a live band with horns. Wanting to name the group something with a distinctive identity which did not sound preachy or worldly, Roger's wife, Linda, suggested Truth. The group hit the road in 1971. Traveling in three station wagons and a truck, the group sang in small churches, colleges, outdoor shopping centers, and youth gatherings throughout the southern United States. They were turned away many times from churches because of their contemporary sound. Many times they performed cover songs written by the Gaithers, including "Get All Excited" and "Because He Lives." They introduced Andrae Crouch's music to the Deep South in the early 1970s.

In 1973 Truth performed "The Church Triumphant" to a standing ovation at the Annual Meeting of the Southern Baptist Convention in Dallas. That opened doors for Truth all over the country. In 1981 Truth had its first of several number 1 songs with "Jesus Never Fails." In 31 years, Truth traveled three million miles, presented 10,000 concerts in 27 nations, and recorded 61 albums with 400 members during their ministry. The final concert was in Nashville on June 16, 2002. The four-hour final concert was attended by hundreds of former Truth members and friends from around the nation.

Today Breland continues directing and touring with the Voices of Mobile, a select ensemble from the University of Mobile, which continues the Truth tradition of bringing contemporary Christian music to churches in the U.S.

== "Jesus Never Fails" ==
In 1981, Truth had been on the road for ten years. They had success in the local church but not much on Christian radio stations. That all changed when Roger heard a song written by Gary Driskell entitled "Jesus Never Fails." The song was recorded as a duet with the rest of the group singing back-up, and it appeared on the 1982 album "Keeper of My Heart." The song rose to number one on the Contemporary Christian charts. Other duets by the group also performed well on the charts like "You'll Still Be Lord Of All."

== The 1990s ==
In 1990, Truth released its third Live album entitled Live and the album was produced with a VHS tape. The group at the time featured Mark Harris, Andy Chrisman, Marty Magehee, and Kirk Sullivan who later started the group 4HIM.

In the 1990s, Roger Breland released a book telling the history of Truth from the beginning until around 1990. It includes stories behind some of the music of the group, including some of the struggles of keeping Truth on the road, as well as triumphant times.

== 40th anniversary tour ==
In January 2011, Breland began to assemble a new Truth group to celebrate the 40th anniversary of the group at the prompting of his sons. On July 31, 2011, the TRUTH40, One More Time Tour kicked off at Sherwood Baptist Church in Albany, Georgia. The concert was filmed live and sold in a DVD format at the product table on the tour. The tour included the traditional Christmas Spectacular section from Thanksgiving until December 21, which was to be the final Truth concert, in Dallas. The tour was extended until April 27, 2012, with The final Truth concert performed at Oak Park Church of God in Mobile. The final Truth album, The 40th Anniversary Collection, contains new arrangements of some of the old Truth hits (the most notable and different being "Majesty") as well a couple of medleys and three new Truth songs: "Right Here with You," "Your God Will Come," and "Love So Amazing."

== 50th Anniversary Reunion and Concert ==
On June 16 and 17, 2022, Truth alums gathered in Mobile for a 50th reunion. An alumni banquet was held on Thursday, the 16th and a concert was held on Friday, the 17th at Cottage Hill Baptist Church. The concert included some of the most talented singers and musicians in the country. Many of whom became well-known in the music industry after their experience in Truth, including Russ Lee, Tiffany Coburn, Jody McBrayer of Avalon, Alicia Wilkinson Garcia, 4Him members, Natalie Grant, Steven V. Taylor, Leigh Cappillino, and Dick & Melodie Tunney performed at the event.

Greg Golden, who served first as the sound tech for Truth in 1973 and then as booking agent for the group, summed up the evening: "I've been reflecting on the 50th anniversary and my 28+ years with TRUTH. To say that the Reunion Concert placed a 'period' —a simple dot— at the end of an amazing history and legacy would be an understatement and a disservice to the lives invested, the efforts expended, and the worldwide impact made.

"Rather than a period, I see the four-hour and forty-song evening as an exclamation point to honor this remarkable and anointed ministry!"

== Discography ==
- 1971: Searching (Mark Records)
- 1972: Get All Excited (Impact Records)
- 1972: TRUTH (Impact)
- 1973: There's Something in the Air (Impact)
- 1973: Because He Lives (Impact)
- 1973: We Want to Love, We Want to Shine (Impact)
- 1974: That's Worth Everything (Impact)
- 1974: You Don't Know What You're Missing Live double album (Impact)
- 1975: Would You Believe (Impact)
- 1976: Songs that Answer Questions (Impact)
- 1977: Truth on the Road - Live Double Album (Impact)
- 1977: Not Just a Coincidence (Paragon Records)
- 1978: Now....THIS is Christmas (Paragon)
- 1978: Departure (direct-to-disc) (Paragon)
- 1979: Nothin' But... (Paragon)
- 1979: The Bright Side (Impact)
- 1980: Changin' Directions (Mighty Miracles Music)
- 1980: Get It from the Source (Paragon)
- 1980: TRUTH Live/SRO (Paragon)
- 1981: Miracles (Mighty Miracles Music)
- 1982: Keeper Of My Heart ((Paragon)
- 1983: Celebrate the Glory (Paragon)
- 1984: Second to None U.S. Christian No. 18
- 1984: Aerobic TRUTH (Paragon)
- 1985: Yours & His...JRB (Mighty Miracle Music)
- 1985: Wind of the Spirit (Paragon)
- 1986: Still the Truth (Benson Records)
- 1987: Makin' It Matter (Benson)
- 1987: Signature Songs (Benson)
- 1988: The Mission (Benson)
- 1988: Now and Forever (Benson)
- 1989: Your Heart Is Where Christmas Is Found (Benson)
- 1990: Keep Believing (Benson Records) U.S. Christian No. 15
- 1990: Live (Benson Records) U.S. Christian No. 36
- 1990: How Great Our Joy (Benson)
- 1991: More than You'll Ever Imagine (Benson)
- 1991: Praise {Integrity Music)
- 1992: Something to Hold On To ([ntegrity Music) U.S. Christian No. 35
- 1994: Equation of Love (Integrity Music) U.S. Christian No. 26
- 1995: You Are Emmanuel (Integrity Music),
- 1995: TRUTH Sings the Word (Integrity Music),
- 1996: One (Integrity Music)
- 1997: Truth: 25th Anniversary (Integrity Music)
- 1998: Never Be The Same (Pamplin Music)
- 1999: Not A Silent Night (Pamplin Music)
- 2000: It's All About Grace (Pamplin Music)
- 2001: Blessed (Benson/Brentwood Music)
- 2011: The 40th Anniversary Collection (TRUTH Music)

== Members (Partial List - Alphabetical) ==
- Mark Adamy
- Linda Adler
- Michael Adler
- Sherri Albaugh
- Melody Alvaro
- Eddie Anders
- Nancy Anders
- Jeff Anderson (singer)
- Jeff Anderson (trumpet player/horn arranger)
- Brad Andrews
- Kevin Anthony
- Lonnie Atkinson
- Jay Bailey
- Diane Ball
- Rick Ball
- Steve Ball
- Jimmy Battle
- Kristin Bauer
- Mike Bauer
- Todd Beaney
- Everett Beard
- Cherie Bebout
- Randy Belt
- Jennifer Blitch
- Rick Borrman
- Christi Bovee
- Mark Bovee
- Robert Bowers
- Steve Bowersox
- Linda (Dove) Boykin
- Emily Breland
- Jason Breland
- John Breland
- Roger Breland
- Barbi Briscoe
- Rick Briscoe
- Karen Hynemann Brown
- Lydia Bru
- Larry Brubaker
- Dale Brunk
- Brian Buckner
- Donna Burk
- Steve Burks
- Carla Burleson
- Jonathan Burleson
- Matt Butler
- Deanna Cabaniss
- Johnny Cabaniss
- Philip Calder
- Mel Canales
- Dana Cappillino
- Leigh Cappillino
- Jody Caraway
- Jonathan Carothers
- Tim Carpenter
- Tom Carpenter
- Buddy Carter
- Bill Cassily
- Joy Lagana Chambley
- Karen Childers
- Mark Childers
- Mike Childers
- Sharon Childers
- Thomas Childs
- Andy Chrisman
- Jacki Chrisman
- Robyn Christensen
- Roger Christian
- Lisa Lee Christina
- Rick Clark
- Scott Clark
- David Cleveland
- Tammy Cleveland
- Dianne Cobb
- Ron Cobb
- Chip Coburn
- Tiffany Coburn
- Lisa Pieper Cochran
- Josh Cohagen
- Mike Cole
- Bill Coleman
- Ernie Collins
- Mary Condit
- Rick Condit
- Kelly Conklin
- Matthew Cork
- David Couch
- Lanny Cox
- Dale Crum
- Alex Cruz
- Anglea Cruz
- Maggie Curry
- Rob Davis
- Russell DeShields
- Linda Dove
- Bobson Dugnutt
- Jimmy Dunn
- Robin Dunn
- Anne Durant
- Kevin Durant
- Ken Ebo
- Mike Eldred
- Jeremy Ellis
- Joe Estes
- Kenna Estes
- Marty Estes
- Glenn "Bubba" Eubanks
- Sherri (Stanford) Eubanks
- Anthony Evans
- Ryan Fabich
- Karen Fairchild
- Shari Beeman Falwell
- Tiffany Farnsworth
- Bill Farnum
- Garner Fielding
- Dan Fine
- Mary Ann Francois
- Tim Frantz
- Ron Freed
- Alicia Williamson Garcia
- Craig Garrett
- Sarah Gass
- Glen George
- Mike Gerrells
- Jim Gibson
- Greg Gillette
- Jerome Gilmer
- Steve Gilpin
- Paul Glasgow
- Greg Golden
- Tog Goodson
- Andrew Goodwin
- Damon Goude
- Natalie Grant
- Staci Grant
- Steve Grant
- Marijean Green
- Steve Green
- Melissa Greene
- Bob Gunn
- Erin Hailey
- Josh Hailey
- Gary Hannie
- Mark Hardy
- Jodie Harris
- Mark Harris
- Vince Harris
- Larry Harrison
- Dave Hart
- Jamie Harvill
- Travis Heath
- Mike Hedden
- Todd Herrbach
- Carolyn Herzer
- Roy Herzer
- Jim Hiigel
- Liz Dorsey Hill
- Jim Hockaday
- Joe Hogue
- Terri Holland
- Leigh Anne Hollinger
- Sarah Holloway
- Eric Holt
- KayAnn Hooge
- Phil Hooge
- Buddy Hornaday
- Stace Howard
- Tyler Howell
- Julie Hudson
- Dann Huff
- Greg Huff
- Homer Humble
- Glen Hummel
- Jason Jackson
- Dave Jacquin
- Gordon Jenewein
- Jan (Holland) Jenkins
- Aaron Johnson
- Dwayne Johnson
- Jordan Johnson
- Justin Johnson
- Kendall Johnson
- Shawn Johnson
- Tiffany Johnson
- Lisa White Jones
- Cheryl (Huey) Jordan
- Daniel Jordan
- Neal Joseph
- Jamie Karnes
- Lori Karnes
- Tim Kealy
- Scott Kerns
- Becky Keith
- Joni Kerns
- Matthew Kerrick
- Benny Key
- Kathy Kingsmore
- Richie Kingsmore
- Aaron Kinssies
- Rikk Kittleman
- Fern Strait Knabel
- Angie Koch
- Tim Lacey
- Jan Pace Lamotte
- Dwayne Larring
- Philip Lassiter
- Lucas Scott Lawrence
- Travis Laws
- Paul Lebar
- Tony LeBron
- Mary Lee
- Russ Lee
- Theresa S Lewis
- Dan Lilley
- Traci Lilley
- Rhonda (Dudley) Lipscomb
- Chris Lockwood
- Brent Loper
- John Lunden
- Bill Lutjens
- Paul Lynch
- Greg Maddox
- Melanie Frazier Madrid
- Marty Magehee
- Mike Majett
- Paul Manning
- Susie Manning
- Beverly (Williamson) Mansfield
- David Mantini
- Don Marchand
- Tim Marshall
- Robbie Mattix
- Bill Maupin
- Jody McBrayer
- Jim McEachern
- Melissa McLellan
- Bob McQueen
- Tracy Thompson McRaea
- Larry Meregillano
- Kevin Miller
- Josh Monroe
- John Morrell
- Peter Mueller
- Dan Mullis
- Keith Murray
- Tony Myles
- Chuck Newman
- Kevin Newton
- Rob Nicewarner
- Jenee Nichols
- Todd Nichols
- Ginger Newman Nickerson
- Bob Nickerson
- Lee Noble
- Kim Noblitt
- Alan Noel
- Tim Norris
- Art Ortiz
- Dan Oxley
- Donna Oxley
- Bo Parker
- Brad Parsley
- Steve Patrick
- Peter Penrose
- Austin Allen Perkins
- Gerald Pfister
- Shane Philen
- Phillip Pike
- Tim Pitchford
- Kristin Platt
- Jana Potter (Long)
- Mark Ramsey
- Tim Ranson
- Andy Rea
- Ken Reich
- Mike Reynolds
- George V Richards
- Sarah Catherine
- Rick Schupp
- Dave Seawel
- David Shannon
- Joel Siegel
- Gary Sims
- Brian Smith
- Tommy Smith
- Rick Spears
- Matt Squires
- Greg Stone
- Jon Stricklan
- Kirk Sullivan
- Michelle Swift
- Steven V. Taylor
- Paul Terrell
- Brandi Thielker
- Mike Thomas
- John Thorn
- Brad Threadgill
- Scot Trull
- Dick Tunney
- Melodie Tunney
- Bernee Tuttle
- Wes Tuttle
- Gordon Twist
- Bob Vander Maten
- Joleen (Ortiz) Vander Maten
- Tommy Vaughan
- Gina Angiulli Walker
- Michael Walker
- Ross Walters
- Chad Watson
- Michael Wells
- Leesa White
- Greg Wiggins
- Elizabeth (Bebe) Wilbanks
- John Wilbanks
- Karen Hale Williams
- Donald G. Wolf
- Lily Helm Wolf
- Larry Wright
- Brent Young
