= The Ride (4Him album) =

Studio album by 4Him
- Released: October 4, 1994
- Studio: The Embassy (Simi Valley, California); Encore Studios (Burbank, California); The Castle, Tejas Recorders and Sound Kitchen, The Bennett House and Classic Recording Studio (Franklin, Tennessee); Sound Stage Studios, Great Circle Sound, Quad Studios and The Lunch Box (Nashville, Tennessee); Uno Mas Studios (Brentwood, Tennessee)
- Genre: Contemporary Christian
- Length: 43:59
- Label: Benson
- Producer: Don Koch; Michael Omartian; Peter Wolf

4Him chronology
The Season of Love (1993)	The Ride (1994)

Professional ratings
Review scores
Source	Rating
AllMusic	3/5 stars

The Ride is the fifth studio album by contemporary Christian group 4Him, released in 1994 on Benson Records. The album reached No. 2 on the Billboard Top Christian Albums chart.

== Track listing ==
No.	Title	Writer(s)	Length
1.	"Wings"	Mark Harris, Don Koch	3:59
2.	"The Nature of Love"	Harris, Steve Camp, Michael Omartian	3:33
3.	"For Future Generations"	Harris, Koch, Dave Clark	4:50
4.	"Shelter in the Rain"	Harris, Marty Magehee	3:49
5.	"Between You and Me"	Harris, Koch, Peter Wolf	4:34
6.	"Real Thing"	Harris, Koch, Clark	4:27
7.	"Ride of Life"	Harris, Koch	4:38
8.	"As Long as My Heart Knows It's You"	Harris, Koch, Clark	4:17
9.	"What Do I Know"	Billy Simon, Jeff Silvey	3:52
10.	"Love Finds You"	Harris, Koch	6:00

== Personnel ==
4Him

- Andy Chrisman – lead vocals (1, 3, 5, 6, 10), backing vocals
- Mark Harris – lead vocals (5, 7, 10), backing vocals
- Marty Magehee – lead vocals (4, 9), backing vocals
- Kirk Sullivan – lead vocals (1, 2, 8, 10), backing vocals
- 4Him – vocal arrangements (3, 7–9)

Musicians

- Peter Wolf – arrangements (1, 5, 10), keyboards (1), bass (1), multi-instruments (5, 10)
- Michael Omartian – keyboards (2, 4, 6)
- Don Koch – keyboards and programming (3, 7–9), track and vocal arrangements (3, 7–9)
- Blair Masters – programming (3, 8)
- Sheldon Reynolds – guitar (1)
- Jerry McPherson – guitar (2, 4, 6), additional guitar (3, 7–9)
- Tom Hemby – additional guitar (3, 7–9)
- Michael Hodge – guitar (3, 7–9)
- Bruce Gaitsch – guitar (10)
- Jackie Street – bass (3, 7–9)
- Vinnie Colaiuta – drums (1, 5, 10)
- Chris McHugh – drums (2, 4, 6)
- John Hammond – drums (3, 7–9)
- Eric Darken – percussion (3, 8, 9)
- Everette Harp – alto sax solo (1), alto saxophone (5)
- Larry Williams – saxophones (1)
- Mark Douthit – saxophones (2, 7)
- Bill Reichenbach, Jr. – trombone (1)
- Chris McDonald – trombone (7), horn arrangements (7)
- Gary Grant – trumpet (1)
- Jerry Hey – trumpet (1)
- Mike Haynes – trumpet (2, 7)
- Jeff Bailey – trumpet (7)

The Nashville String Machine (Tracks 3, 4, 8 & 9)

- Don Wyrtzen – French horn and string arrangements (3, 8, 9)
- Michael Omartian – string arrangements (4)
- David Angell John Catchings, Bruce Christensen, David Davidson, Carl Gorodetzky, Jim Grosjean, Robert Heuer, Jack Jezioro, Anthony LaMarchina, Lee Larrison, Ted Madsen, Bob Mason, Tom McAninch, Leslie Norton, Randall Olson, Monisa Phillips, Mary Lee Scott, Pamela Sixfin, Elizabeth Stewart, Julie Tanner, Alan Umstead, Catherine Umstead, Mary Kathryn Vanosedale and Joy Worland – strings and French horns

Choir on "For Future Generations"

- Christ Church Choir
- Brett Barry, Erin Barry, Bill Baumgart, Jane Baumgart, Carrie Hodge, Michael Hodge, Darris Jordan, Leslie Koch, Ann Trubey, Beverly White and Brett Wilson – additional choir

== Production ==
- Bill Baumgart – executive producer
- Peter Wolf – producer (1, 5, 10)
- Michael Omartian – producer (2, 4, 6)
- Don Koch – producer (3, 7–9)
- Susan Martinez – production coordinator (2, 4, 6)
- Brett Wilson – production assistant (3, 7–9)
- Connie Harrington – art direction
- The Riordan Design Group, Inc. – design
- Mark Tucker – group photography
- David White – roller coaster photography
- Elizabeth Martin – grooming, make-up
- Claudia McConnell-Fowler – stylist
- Mike Atkins – management

Technical credits

- Paul Ericksen – recording (1, 5, 10)
- Tom Lord-Alge – mixing (1–7, 10)
- Terry Christian – engineer (2, 4, 6)
- John Jaszcz – recording (3, 7–9), mixing (8, 9)
- David Betancourt – mix assistant (1–7, 10)
- Scott Link – assistant engineer (2, 4, 9)
- Mark Ralston – mix assistant (9)
- David Jahnsen – additional engineer (2–4, 9)
- Lynn Fuston – additional recording (3)
- John Hurley – additional recording (3), mix assistant (8)
- Doug Sarrett – additional recording (3, 7, 9)
- Don Koch – additional recording (8)
- Bret Teegarden – additional recording (9)
