= Stand (Avalon album) =

Studio album by Avalon
- Released: January 24, 2006
- Recorded: 2005
- Genre: CCM, Inspirational
- Length: 40:15
- Label: Sparrow
- Producer: Shaun Shankel Mark Hammond Bernie Herms

Avalon chronology
The Creed (2004)	Stand (2006)	Faith: A Hymns Collection (2006)

Professional ratings
Review scores
Source	Rating
Allmusic	4.5/5 stars

Stand is Avalon's ninth release and their sixth studio album. Originally titled The Other Side and slated to release in September 2005, Stand was actually released on January 24, 2006. The album includes a remake of a Russ Taff song, "We Will Stand", that features an additional bridge written by Taff, his wife Tori, and James Hollihan, Jr. Stand marked the 10-year anniversary for the group.

== Track listing ==
No.	Title	Writer(s)	Sung by	Length
1.	"The Other Side"	Barry Week, Ian Eskelin, Jody McBrayer, Melissa Greene, Tony Wood	Jody & Melissa	3:39
2.	"Love Won't Leave You"	Ben Glover, Shaun Shankel	Greg	3:57
3.	"Orphans of God"	Joel Lindsey, Twila LeBar	Janna	4:31
4.	"Somehow You Are"	Bernie Herms, James Ingram	Janna, Jody & Greg	3:32
5.	"Slowly"	Glover, Ingram	Greg	3:59
6.	"We Will Stand" (featuring Russ Taff)	James Hollihan, Jr., Russ Taff, Tori Taff	All split lead	4:09
7.	"Jesus"	Chad Cates, Dan Muckala, Ronnie Freeman	Jody	4:19
8.	"I Survive"	Amy Powers, Dorian Cheah, Michele Vice-Maslin	Greg & Melissa	3:09
9.	"When the Time Comes"	Sam Mizell, Wood	Janna	4:24
10.	"Where Joy and Sorrow Meet"	David James White	Melissa	4:36
Total length:				40:15

== Personnel ==
Avalon

- Janna Long – vocals
- Jody McBrayer – vocals
- Melissa Greene – vocals
- Greg Long – vocals

Musicians

- Shaun Shankel – keyboards, acoustic piano, programming, arrangements, string arrangements
- Bernie Herms – keyboards, acoustic piano, arrangements, string arrangements
- Mark Hammond – programming, drums, string arrangements
- Brian Gocher – programming, acoustic guitar
- Rob Hawkins – guitars
- Will Owsley – guitars
- Tony Lucido – bass
- Joey Canaday – bass
- Mark Hill – bass
- Adam Nitti – bass
- Shannon Forrest – drums
- Scott Williamson – drums
- John Mock – Uilleann pipes
- David Hamilton – string arrangements
- David Davidson – string arrangements
- Steve Mauldin – orchestrations
- Russ Taff – vocals (6)

String Section

- David Angell, Monisa Angell, Janet Askey, David Davidson, Jack Jezioro, Anthony LaMarchina, Sarighani Reist, Pamela Sixfin, Mary Kathryn Vanosdale and Kristin Wilkinson – string players

Choir on "We Will Stand"

- Alexia Counce
- Vicki Dvoracek
- Maribeth Johnson
- Shelly Johnson
- Dennis Morgan
- Tami Pryce

== Radio singles ==
- "Love Won't Leave You"
- "Orphans of God"
- "Somehow You Are"
