= Reborn (Avalon album) =

Studio album by Avalon
- Released: September 15, 2009
- Recorded: 2009
- Genre: Contemporary Christian music
- Length: 36:05
- Label: E1
- Producer: Ian Eskelin, Barry Weeks

Avalon chronology
| Avalon: The Greatest Hits (2009) | Reborn (2009) | Called (2020) |

Singles from Reborn
- 1. "Arise" Released: August 2009; 2. "Alive" Released: February 2010

Professional ratings
Review scores
| Source | Rating |
|---|---|
| AllMusic | 4/5 stars |
| Christianity Today | 4/5 stars |
| ChristianMusicReview.org | (B−) |
| Jesus Freak Hideout | 3.5/5 stars |

Reborn is Avalon's thirteenth release and their ninth studio album. It is the first album featuring Amy Richardson as a member of Avalon and the first full album to feature Jeremi Richardson. It also marks the first album with E1 Music as Avalon's new record label. Released on September 15, 2009, Reborn contains the radio singles "Arise" and "Alive"; "Arise" peaked at the No. 1 position on Billboard's Soft AC/Inspirational National Airplay radio chart in late 2009, garnering Avalon their 22nd career No. 1 hit.

== Track listing ==
| No. | Title | Writer(s) | Lead vocals | Length |
|---|---|---|---|---|
| 1. | "Reborn" | Ian Eskelin, Doug McKelvey, Barry Weeks | All split lead | 3:29 |
| 2. | "Alive" | Weeks, Tony Wood, James Rueger | Greg Long, Janna Long, Amy Richardson | 3:00 |
| 3. | "Arise" | Eskelin, Weeks, Brian White | All split lead | 3:26 |
| 4. | "Feel" | Eskelin, Britt Nicole | Janna Long, Amy Richardson | 3:03 |
| 5. | "Fragile" | Eskelin, Wood | Jeremi Richardson | 3:15 |
| 6. | "Destined" | Weeks, Sue Smith, Simon Hawkins | Janna Long, Jeremi Richardson | 3:42 |
| 7. | "Stay" | Clint Lagerberg, Zach Nielsen | Greg Long, Jeremi Richardson | 3:57 |
| 8. | "Angels" | Paul Field, Henk Pool, Kees Kraaijenoord | All split lead | 4:08 |
| 9. | "California" | Eskelin, Weeks | Janna Long, Jeremi Richardson | 3:05 |
| 10. | "Holy" | Richy Clark, Radiant Worship | All split lead | 4:57 |
| Total length: | | | | 36:05 |

== Personnel ==
Avalon

- Janna Long – vocals
- Jeremi Richardson – vocals
- Amy McBride Richardson – vocals
- Greg Long – vocals

Musicians

- Brian Duncan – keyboards, acoustic piano, programming
- Mike Payne – guitars
- Tony Lucido – bass
- Ricky Free – drums
- Ben Phillips – drums

== Production ==
- Norman Miller – executive producer
- Ian Eskelin – producer
- Barry Weeks – additional vocal production, mixing
- Dan Shike – mastering
- Ben McCraw – design, layout
- Josh Hailey – photography
