= The Season of Love =

Studio album by 4Him
- Released: October 1, 1993
- Recorded: 1992–1993
- Genre: Christmas, Contemporary Christian
- Length: 40:23
- Label: Benson
- Producer: Don Koch

4Him chronology
The Basics of Life (1992)	The Season of Love (1993)	The Ride (1994)

Professional ratings
Review scores
Source	Rating
AllMusic	3/5 stars

The Season of Love (also known as Christmas: The Season of Love) is a Christmas album, as well as the fourth studio album, of the contemporary Christian group 4Him. It was released on Benson Records on October 1, 1993.

Due to its original success among 4Him's works, the album was re-issued on September 30, 1996, with a new album cover and art.

== Track listing ==
No.	Title	Writer(s)	Length
1.	"The Season of Love"	Mark Harris, Don Koch	4:15
2.	"White Christmas"	Irving Berlin	3:12
3.	"The Little Drummer Boy"	Katherine Davis, Henry Onorati, Harry Simone	3:24
4.	"A Night to Remember/O Holy Night"	Harris, Koch; Adolphe Adam, Placide Cappeau	4:25
5.	"O Little Town of Bethlehem/It Came Upon the Midnight Clear/Away in a Manger/Silent Night! Holy Night!" (medley)		5:18
6.	"Do You Hear What I Hear"	Noël Regney, Gloria Shayne Baker	3:29
7.	"In Your Care"	Harris, Billy Simon	5:11
8.	"Hold on to Christmas"	Dave Clark, Koch	3:37
9.	"God Rest Ye Merry Gentlemen"		2:59
10.	"A Strange Way to Save the World"	Clark, Harris, Koch	4:33
Total length:			40:23

- All vocal arrangements by Don Koch and 4Him except "The Little Drummer Boy" by Bill Baumgart.

== Personnel ==
- Numbers in parentheses symbolize track numbers.

4Him

- Andy Chrisman – lead vocals (2–5, 7, 9), backing vocals
- Mark Harris – lead vocals (2, 4, 5, 10), backing vocals
- Marty Magehee – lead vocals (5, 6, 8, 9), backing vocals
- Kirk Sullivan – lead vocals (1, 5, 9), backing vocals

Musicians

- Don Koch – rhythm arrangements (1, 4), keyboards (1), additional keyboards (2, 4, 5, 8, 9), programming (6), track arrangements (6, 7), acoustic piano (10)
- Blair Masters – Hammond B3 organ (1), programming (4, 7), keyboards (7)
- David Huntsinger – keyboards (2, 5, 8, 9)
- Bill Baumgart – programming (3)
- Jerry McPherson – guitar (1)
- Dennis Dearing – guitar (1)
- Mark Baldwin – guitar (2, 5, 6, 8, 9)
- Michael Hodge – guitar (4, 7), guitar solo (8, 9)
- Jackie Street – bass (1)
- Craig Nelson – bass (2, 5, 8, 9)
- John Hammond – drums (1)
- Mark Hammond – drums (2, 5, 8, 9)
- Mark Douthit – saxophones (1), sax solo (4)
- Sam Levine – sax solo (5)
- Barry Green – trombone (1, 4, 6)
- Chris McDonald – trombone (1, 4, 6), brass arrangements (1, 4, 6)
- Jeff Bailey – trumpet (1, 4, 6)
- Mike Haynes – trumpet (1, 4, 6)

The Nashville String Machine (Tracks 2, 4–6 & 8–10)

- Ralph Carmichael – orchestral arrangements (2, 5, 8, 9), string arrangements (4, 6, 10)
- David Angell, David Davidson, Paul Brantley, John Catchings, Ernie Collins, Chris Dunn, Conni Ellisor, Barry Green, Carl Gorodetzky, Jim Grosjean, Anthony LaMarchina, Lee Larrison, Ted Madsen, Bob Mason, Tom McAninch, Chris McDonald, Laura Molyneaux, Leslie Norton, Randall Olson, Monisa Phillips, Eberhard Ramm, Pamela Sixfin, Bobby Taylor, Alan Umstead, Catherine Umstead, Gary Vanosdale, Mary Kathryn Vanosdale, Kristin Wilkinson and Joy Worland – orchestra and string performers

Choir on "Do You Hear What I Hear"

- Bill Baumgart, Chris Willis, Mark Ivey, Angelo and Veronica Petrucci, Rick Elias and Linda Elias

== Production ==
- Don Koch – producer
- Ralph Carmichael – co-producer (2, 5, 8, 9)
- Andy Ivey – executive producer
- Bill Deaton – engineer
- Tom Laune – engineer
- Lynn Fuston – engineer
- Keith Compton – engineer
- Bill Baumgart – engineer
- David Murphy – engineer
- Bret Teegarden – engineer
- Brent King – engineer
- The Bennett House, Franklin, Tennessee – recording location
- Quad Studios, Nashville, Tennessee – recording location
- Sound Revolutions, Nashville, Tennessee – recording location
- Classic Recording, Nashville, Tennessee – recording location
- Skylab Studios, Nashville, Tennessee – recording location
- Great Circle Sound, Nashville, Tennessee – recording location
- Omni Sound Studios, Nashville, Tennessee – recording location
- John Jaszcz – mixing at Omni Sound Studios
- Patrick Kelly – mix assistant
- Aaron Swihart – mix assistant
- Ken Love – mastering at MasterMix (Nashville, Tennessee)
- Mike Murray – production assistant
- Mark Quattrochi – production assistant
- Mark Tucker – photography
- Connie Harrington – art direction
- June Arnold – grooming
- Claudia McConnell Fowler – hair stylist

1996 re-issue cover

- Matt Barnes – photography
- Patrick Pollei – design
- Randall Lockridge – design
- Mike Rapp – art direction
- Jamie Kearney – wardrobe
- Melanie Shelley – stylist
