= Keep Breathing =

Keep Breathing may refer to:

- Keep Breathing (album), a 2016 album by Jody McBrayer
- Keep Breathing (TV series), a 2022 American streaming television series
- "Keep Breathing", a song by Ingrid Michaelson from her 2008 album Be OK
