= Testify to Love: The Very Best of Avalon =

Greatest hits album by Avalon
- Released: March 25, 2003
- Recorded: 1996–2002
- Genre: CCM, Inspirational
- Length: 70:55
- Label: Sparrow
- Producer: Brown Bannister, Charlie Peacock, Tedd T

Avalon chronology
O2: Avalon Remixed (2002)	Testify to Love: The Very Best of Avalon (2003)	The Creed (2004)

Testify to Love: The Very Best of Avalon is Avalon's seventh release—the group's first greatest hits collection—and is titled appropriately after the quartet's hit, "Testify to Love". It is the first album showcasing Melissa Greene, who replaced Cherie Adams, and the last album featuring founding member Michael Passons. Although mostly consisting of previous radio hits, three new songs were added—"New Day", "Everything to Me", and "Pray", with a bonus Christmas song. "Wonder Why" has an alternate opening from the original album version.

== Track listing ==
1. "New Day" (Janna Long, Jody McBrayer, Lydia Gott, Tedd T - 3:27 *New track; Sung by Janna
2. "The Greatest Story" - 4:52
3. "Give It Up" - 4:11
4. "Everything to Me" (Chad Cates, Sue Smith) - 4:49 *New track; Sung by Michael and Melissa
5. "Testify to Love" - 4:47
6. "Adonai" - 4:02
7. "Knockin' on Heavens Door" - 3:39
8. "Take You at Your Word" - 4:43
9. "Can't Live a Day" - 4:46
10. "Always Have, Always Will" - 4:17
11. "In Not Of" - 4:03
12. "Pray" (Keith Brown, Dennis Matkosky, Maria Vidal) - 3:57 *New track; Sung by Jody and Melissa
13. "The Glory" - 5:05
14. "Wonder Why" - 4:03
15. "I Don't Wanna Go" - 5:30
16. "Don't Save It All for Christmas Day" (Bonus track) - 4:44

== Personnel ==
Avalon

- Janna Long – vocals
- Jody McBrayer – vocals
- Melissa Greene – vocals
- Michael Passons – vocals
- Cherie Adams – vocals (Prior releases)
- Nikki Hassman-Anders – vocals (Prior releases)

== Radio singles ==
- New Day+
- Everything to Me+

+ Denotes #1 Radio Hit
