= Mike Eldred (singer) =

American musical theater performer

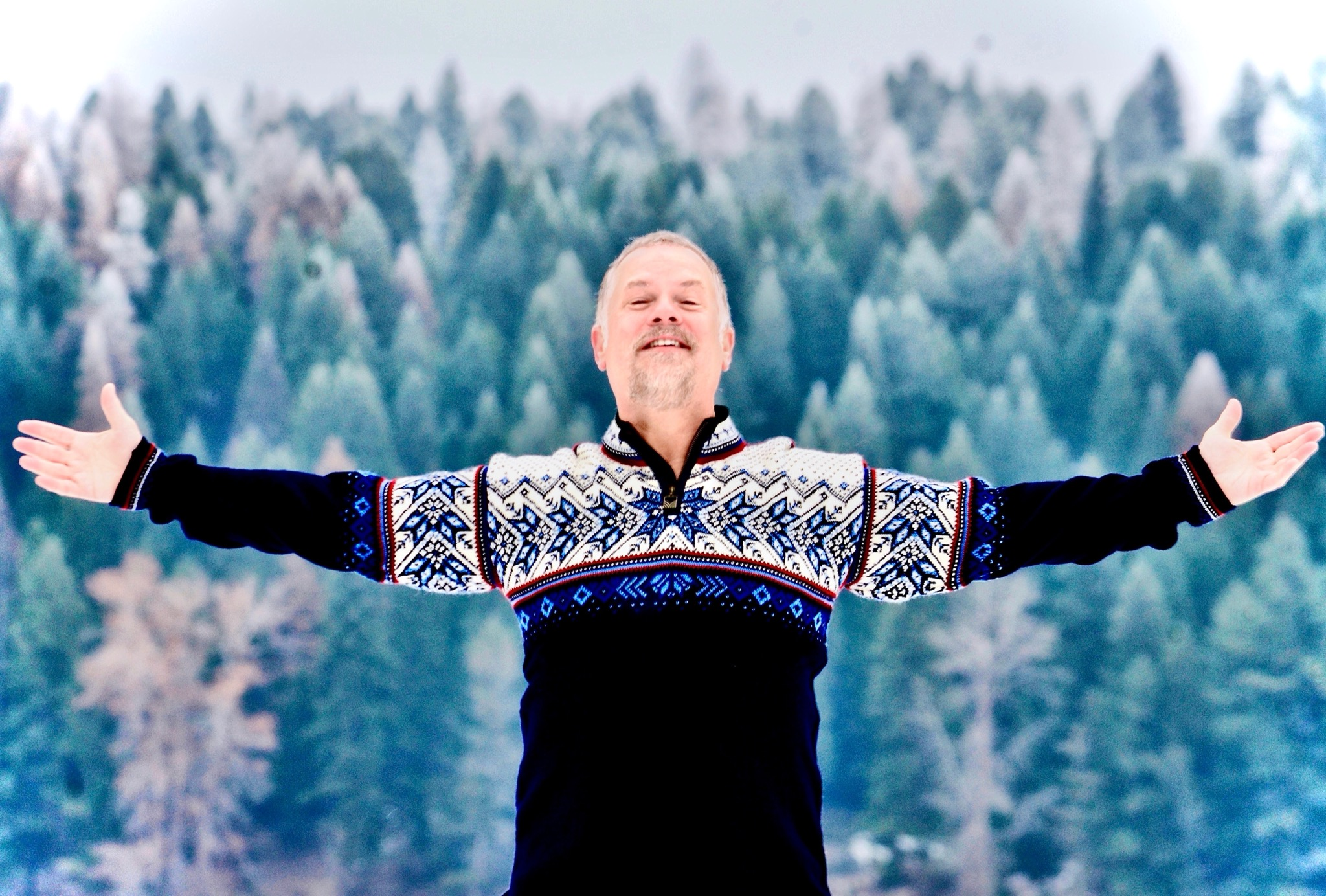
Mike Eldred in Montana.

Mike Eldred (born June 12, 1965) is an American tenor, known for his work in musical theater. He has performed on Broadway and in regional productions. He has also appeared in concert, as well as on recordings, radio, and television.

== Early life ==
Eldred was born part of a musical family that traveled by bus, performing in Christian revivals and events. His father was not only a Baptist preacher but also a classic baritone and a tuba player. Young Mike was harmonizing with music on the radio at the age of four.

== Career ==
=== Early years (Contemporary Christian, Nashville) ===
Eldred, whose voice was classically trained, majored in voice at Stephen F. Austin State University. While still in his teens, however, he left to join a contemporary Christian band; he was with Truth for around two years. At age 21, he went to Nashville and launched a career in country and gospel music. In addition to two solo records, he sang backup for Faith Hill and Tim McGraw. He also worked with Garth Brooks and Amy Grant.

=== Theater ===
With no previous experience as an actor, Eldred began his stage career in 1996 when he landed a role in the 25th anniversary tour of Jesus Christ Superstar.

He was in the original Broadway cast of The Civil War (1999), which was nominated for a Tony Award.

In 2003, during the final months of the long Broadway run of Les Misérables, Eldred was understudy and performer in the starring role, Jean Valjean. He then went on to perform as Valjean in other theaters around the United States. In particular, his performance during the Pennsylvania Shakespeare Festival in 2015 drew praise.

He starred as "The Tenor" in the 2010 national concert tour of Handel's Messiah Rocks.

=== Audio and video ===
Numerous appearances on recordings and DVDs.

Solo CDs:

- Uncommon Love (1989): a collection of gospel songs and ballads for the Home Sweet Home Records label.
- Never Stop (1990): synth-flavored soft rock and ballads, also issued by Home Sweet Home.
- Me (2001): features favorites from the stage drawn from Eldred's years on Broadway. The Tennessean praised Eldred's vocal abilities during the recording of this album.
- Let It Begin (2006): a holiday album.
- Come Love Me Again (2011): a celebration of the music of John Denver.

=== In concert ===
- Has performed with many of North America's leading symphony orchestras.
- Toured with Dennis DeYoung of Styx for symphony concerts in 2003. The Chicago Tribune called Eldred's performance "inspiring."
- Has also given well-received concerts devoted to John Denver songs.

=== As concert producer ===
Eldred, who lives in Whitefish, Montana, launched a quarterly concert series called "On the Stage" in Whitefish in 2018. His goal was to keep the shows intimate and bring various accomplished friends to the Flathead Valley. The first performer was Marcus Hummon. Subsequent acts included Victoria Shaw and Sylvia. NFL player turned singer Mike Reid was scheduled for March 2020.
