= Mark Harris (musician) =

American songwriter

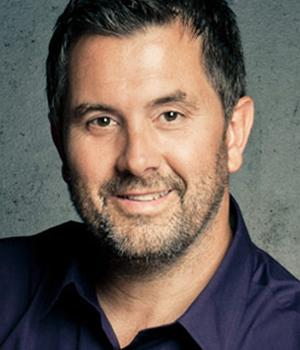
- Harris in 2004

Background information
- Born: Marcus Harris; August 1, 1962 (age 63); Mobile, Alabama, U.S.
- Genres: Contemporary Christian, contemporary worship
- Occupations: Singer, songwriter, senior worship pastor
- Instrument: Vocals
- Years active: 1989–present
- Labels: Integrity Music, Gateway Publishing, Fair Trade Services

Mark Harris is an American contemporary Christian music (CCM) singer and songwriter. He was part of the Christian band 4Him.

== Career ==
Harris began his music career in the contemporary Christian music group Truth after graduating from Lee University in Cleveland, Tennessee.

=== 4Him (1989–2006) ===
Harris is a founding member of the CCM male quartet, 4Him, which toured and recorded from 1990 to 2006. He wrote or co-wrote 25 number-one songs. 4Him won eight GMA Dove Awards, and were nominated for a Grammy Award for their album The Message.

=== Solo (2006–present) ===
Harris began a solo career in 2005 and released his debut solo album, The Line Between the Two. He followed Windows and Walls. He won a GMA Dove Award in the category of Inspirational Song of the Year for his single "Find Your Wings". In 2009, he released a Christmas album titled, Christmas Is. In 2011, he released his fourth solo project, Stronger in the Broken Places. As a solo artist he has had three number-one songs.

He also released a book with Howard Publishing/Simon and Schuster in 2009, that bears the same title as his hit, "Find Your Wings".

Harris joined the staff at Gateway Church in Southlake, Texas, in March 2013, and serves as executive pastor of worship ministries.

== Discography ==
=== As member of 4Him ===
- 1990: 4Him
- 1991: Face the Nation
- 1992: The Basics of Life
- 1993: The Season of Love (Christmas)
- 1994: The Ride
- 1996: The Message
- 1998: Obvious
- 2000: Hymns: A Place of Worship
- 2001: Walk On
- 2003: Visible

=== Solo ===
Year	Title	Label	Charts		
Year	Title	Label	Christian	Heat	Holiday
2005	The Line Between the Two	Sony Records	14	11	—
2007	Windows and Walls	INO Records	22	19	—
2009	Christmas Is	INO Records	—	47	25
2011	Stronger in the Broken Places	Word / Warner Bros.	—	—	—

==== Singles ====
Year	Title	Peak positions	
Year	Title	Christian	AC
2005	"Find Your Wings"	4	30
2007	"One True God"	23	—
2010	"Christmas Is"	29	—
2011	"Stronger in the Broken Places"	—	—
2011	"When We're Together"	—	—

- "Find Your Wings" (from The Line Between the Two) No. 1 on R&R Adult Contemporary charts

==== Other album appearances ====
- 2004: Creation: The Story of Life (various artists), "The Story of Light"
- 2007: Glory Revealed: The Word of God in Worship (various artists), "By His Wounds" (with Steven Curtis Chapman, Mark Hall, Brian Litrell, Mac Powell)
- 2011: Consuming Worship (various artists), "Ashes To Fire"
- 2011: Courageous: Motion Picture Soundtrack (various artists), "When We're Together"

=== With Gateway Worship ===
- 2014: It Is Written: Songs from Gateway Devotions
- 2015: The Blessed Life: Songs from Gateway Devotions
- 2015: WALLS
- 2017: Monuments

== Tours ==
- Freedom Blast Tour (2000, 2001)
