= A Maze of Grace =

Studio album by Avalon
- Released: December 9, 1997
- Recorded: 1997
- Studio: re:Think Studio, Sound Emporium Studios, Starstruck Studios, Sound Stage Studios and Wright Studio (Nashville, Tennessee); Fun Attic Studio (Franklin, Tennessee)
- Genre: Inspirational
- Length: 42:25
- Label: Sparrow
- Producer: Charlie Peacock; Chris Harris

Avalon chronology
| Avalon (1996) | A Maze of Grace (1997) | In a Different Light (1999) |

Professional ratings
Review scores
| Source | Rating |
|---|---|
| AllMusic | 4/5 stars |

A Maze of Grace is Avalon's second album, released in December 1997. It contains the hit single "Testify to Love", which has become the group's trademark song, the longest-running Adult Contemporary song in the history of the CCM Update AC chart. The album was Avalon's first to be certified Gold by the RIAA. Shortly after the release of the album, Nikki Hassman (now Anders) left the quartet to pursue a solo career with Sony Records.

== Track listing ==
| No. | Title | Writer(s) | Length |
|---|---|---|---|
| 1. | "Testify to Love" | Paul Field; Henk Pool; Robert Riekerk; Ralph van Manen | 4:40 |
| 2. | "A World Away" | Avalon; Charlie Peacock | 4:11 |
| 3. | "A Maze of Grace" | Peacock; Grant Cunningham | 4:29 |
| 4. | "Knockin' on Heaven's Door" | Cunningham; Matt Huesmann | 3:34 |
| 5. | "Adonai" | Lorraine Ferro; Don Koch; Stephanie Lewis | 4:02 |
| 6. | "Speed of Light" | Huesmann; Kyle Matthews; Jody McBrayer; Michael Passons | 4:02 |
| 7. | "The Move" | Peacock; Margaret Becker; Rick Will | 5:01 |
| 8. | "Reason Enough" | Ty Lacy; John Mandeville; Shelli Mandeville | 4:19 |
| 9. | "Forgive + Forget" | Cunningham; Huesmann | 4:09 |
| 10. | "Dreams I Dream for You" | Peacock; Douglas Kaine McKelvey | 3:58 |

== Personnel ==
Avalon

- Janna Long – vocals
- Jody McBrayer – vocals
- Nikki Hassman-Anders – vocals
- Michael Passons – vocals

Musicians

- Tony Miracle – programming (1–3, 7–10), synthesizers (1–3, 5, 7–10)
- Charlie Peacock – programming (2, 3, 7), synthesizers (2, 3, 7)
- Dan Muckala – programming (4), synthesizers (4)
- Tim Akers – acoustic piano (5)
- Matt Huesmann – programming (6, 9), synthesizers (6, 9)
- George Cocchini – guitars (1, 9), electric guitar (7)
- Jerry McPherson – guitars (2–4, 8, 10), electric guitar (7)
- Mark Baldwin – guitars (5)
- Brent Barcus – guitars (6, 9)
- Mark Hill – bass (1, 3, 6, 8)
- Jimmie Lee Sloas – bass (5)
- Steve Brewster – drums (1, 3, 5, 7, 8)
- Chris McHugh – drums (2, 4)
- Aaron Smith – drums (6, 9)
- Tom Howard – string arrangements and conductor (5)
- Carl Gorodetzky – string contractor (5)
- The Nashville String Machine – strings (5)

== Production ==
- Grant Cunningham – executive producer
- Charlie Peacock – producer, additional recording
- Chris Harris – co-producer
- Shane D. Wilson – recording (1–6, 8–10), string recording (5)
- Rick Will – recording (7)
- Jason Boertje – recording assistant (1–6, 8–10)
- Matt Andrews – string recording assistant (5)
- Greg Spinner – recording assistant (7)
- Tom Laune – vocal recording
- Robert "Void" Capiro – vocal recording assistant
- Matt Huesmann – vocal editing
- David Leonard – mixing (1, 2, 4, 8)
- Scott McCutcheson – mix assistant (1, 2, 4, 8)
- Amy Leonard – mix coordinator (1, 2, 4, 8)
- F. Reid Shippen – mixing (3, 5–7, 9, 10)
- Al Grassmick – mix assistant (3, 5–7, 9, 10)
- Tony Green – mix assistant (3, 5–7, 9, 10)
- Ken Love – mastering at MasterMix (Nashville, Tennessee)
- PJ Heimmerman – production coordinator
- Katy Krippaehne – production coordinator
- Jan Cook – art direction
- Torne White – design
- Christiév Carothers – creative direction
- Paul Elledge – photography
- Kristen Gosset – grooming, styling
- Rosemary Tackleberry – hair, make-up
- Norman Miller and Glenda McNalley for Proper Management – management

== Radio Singles ==
- Adonai+
- Knockin' On Heaven's Door+
- Reason Enough+
- Testify to Love+

+ Denotes #1 Radio Hit
