= Avalon (American group) =

American contemporary Christian vocal quartet

Avalon Worship
- Origin: Nashville, Tennessee
- Genre: CCM
- Instrument: Voice
- Years active: 1995–present
- Labels: Sparrow Records, E1 Music, Red Street
- Members: Janna Long; Greg Long; Jody McBrayer
- Past members: Jeremi Richardson; Dani Rocca; Amy McBride Richardson; Melissa Greene; Michael Passons; Cherie Adams; Nikki Hassman-Anders; Rikk Kittlemann; Tabitha Fair
- Website: avalonthegroup.com

Avalon, also known as Avalon Worship, is an American contemporary Christian vocal quartet from Nashville and was formed in 1995. The group has earned multiple RIAA-certified gold records. The group consists of Janna Long, Greg Long, and Jody McBrayer. The newest fourth member has yet to be revealed.

== Group history ==
=== 1995–97 ===
Avalon was formed in 1995 in Nashville after Norman Miller of Proper Management took the idea of beginning a vocal group to Grant Cunningham, A&R Director at Sparrow Records. Cunningham attended an artist showcase in Nashville where he heard singer Michael Passons and made him the first Avalon member. Former Truth vocalist and South Carolina native Janna Potter (later Janna Long) became the group's second member.

Rikk Kittlemann and Tabitha Fair became part of the group, but each left after a short time. Long contacted McBrayer, her former Truth bandmate, who joined the group. Nikki Hassman (now Nikki Hassman-Anders) was also chosen. Hassman recorded two albums with Avalon, Avalon (1996) and A Maze of Grace (1997), before leaving in May 1998 to pursue a solo career with Sony Records.

=== 1998–02 ===
Cherie Paliotta (later Cherie Adams) replaced Hassman in the group. Adams recorded four albums with Avalon: In a Different Light (1999), Joy: A Christmas Collection (2000), Oxygen (2001), and a remix album, O2: Avalon Remixed (March 2002). She departed the group and was replaced by Melissa Greene, a former Truth member, in September 2002.

In September 2002, McBrayer released a solo album, This Is Who I Am, which included the Top 10 duet with Jadyn Maria "Never Alone (Nunca Solo)" and a No. 1 single "To Ever Live Without Me." Janna Long released a self-titled solo album in October 2002 which contained the No. 2 song "Greater Is He".

=== 2003–06 ===
On March 25, 2003, Avalon released a greatest hits record, Testify to Love: The Very Best of Avalon, which featured two new singles that became No. 1 hits; "Everything to Me" and "New Day". It was the last album to include Passons.

Passons revealed in an interview in 2020 that he was forced out of Avalon due to his sexual orientation as a gay man and refusal to continue attending conversion therapy. Although a member of the group when it fired Passons, Greene has supported Passons. Passons was replaced by Long's husband, Greg.

On February 24, 2004, Avalon released the studio album The Creed, from which three singles were released, "All", which reached No. 2 on the Adult Contemporary Christian Songs chart; "You Were There," a No. 2 Inspirational Charts hit; and "I Wanna Be With You". Avalon's sixth studio album, Stand, was released on January 24, 2006. The single "Love Won't Leave You" peaked in the Top 20 of Billboard Hot Christian Songs and Hot Christian Adult Contemporary charts. The single, "Orphans of God" peaked in the Top 5 of Radio & Records' Inspo chart the week of August 11, 2006. "Somehow You Are" was released to radio in August 2006. On October 17, 2006, Avalon released a hymns album Faith: A Hymns Collection.

=== 2007–09 ===
In 2007, McBrayer announced he would leave Avalon after being diagnosed with a heart condition known as hypertrophic cardiomyopathy.

On February 26, 2008, Avalon released its ninth album, Another Time, Another Place: Timeless Christian Classics. After the album's release there was a tour, "The We Will Stand Tour", with Michael English, the Daniel Doss Band, and Cadia. The first single released from Another Time, Another Place was Avalon's cover of the Twila Paris song "God Is in Control." The second single, released on November 5, 2007, was a remake of the Sandi Patty/Wayne Watson song "Another Time, Another Place." On November 13, 2007, Avalon released Another Time, Another Place EP, a digital EP featuring three singles from the album, "God is in Control" and "Another Time, Another Place," and a cover of the Amy Grant song "Thy Word."

Jeremi Richardson joined Avalon in 2007 replacing McBrayer. Richardson had sung with the group Voices of Liberty at Walt Disney World. On November 11, 2007 at a show in Spring Arbor, Michigan, Greene announced that it was the first concert with Richardson officially being a member of the group. In 2008, EMI CMG released Avalon: The Greatest Hits. The album featured a new song from Avalon, "Still My God." On March 31, 2009, "Still My God" became Avalon's first No. 1 single since "New Day" was released in 2003, from Avalon's previous greatest hits album.

On May 15, 2009, Melissa Greene announced her resignation from Avalon upon accepting a position as pastor of Music and Arts at GracePointe Church in Nashville. Richardson's wife, Amy, replaced Greene on May 21, 2009. On May 19, 2009, Avalon recorded Reborn, its first studio album since Stand in 2006, on E1 Music, ending the group's affiliation with Sparrow Records. The first single, "Arise," was released to Christian radio in August 2009 and became Avalon's 22nd career No. 1 radio hit, topping Billboard's Soft AC/Inspirational chart.

=== 2018–present: Called ===
On August 7, 2018, after a decade as members of Avalon, Jeremi and Amy Richardson stopped touring. Avalon announced on their Facebook page the return of Jody McBrayer and the addition of new member, Dani Rocca. On October 24, 2018, Avalon announced that they had signed as the flagship artist with Red Street Records, a new label launched by Rascal Flatts bassist Jay DeMarcus. On November 1, 2018, they sang their debut concert as Avalon in Jacksonville, Florida on the opening night of the Greatest Hits Tour, organized by Newsong.

Avalon released "Keeper of My Heart" on December 7, 2019, 10 years after Avalon's previous radio single. It was followed by a new album, Called, on February 14, 2020 and tour.

In 2022, the group rebranded under the name Avalon Worship and have released a self-titled album with this moniker.

== Members ==
=== Current members ===
- Janna (Potter) Long (1995–present)
- Greg Long (2003–present)
- Jody McBrayer (1995–2007, 2018–present)

=== Former members ===
- Rikk Kittlemann (1995)
- Tabitha Fair (1995–1996)
- Nikki Hassman-Anders (1996–1998)
- Cherie (Paliotta) Adams (1998–2002)
- Michael Passons (1995–2003)
- Melissa Greene (2002–2009)
- Jeremi Richardson (2007–2018)
- Amy McBride-Richardson (2009–2018)
- Dani Rocca (2018–2025)

== Discography ==
=== Studio albums ===
Title	Album details	Peak chart positions			Certifications
Title	Album details	US	US Christ.	US Heat.	Certifications
Avalon	Released: December 26, 1996; Label: Sparrow; Format: CD, CS	—	10	30	
A Maze of Grace	Released: December 9, 1997; Label: Sparrow; Format: CD	153	6	8	RIAA: Gold
In a Different Light	Released: March 23, 1999; Label: Sparrow; Format: CD, CS	81	2	—	RIAA: Gold
Oxygen	Released: May 22, 2001; Label: Sparrow; Format: CD, CS	37	1	—	
The Creed	Released: February 24, 2004; Label: Sparrow; Format: CD, DL (Download)	104	4	—	
Stand	Released: January 24, 2006; Label: Sparrow; Format: CD, DL	160	7	—	
Faith: A Hymns Collection	Released: October 17, 2006; Label: Sparrow; Format: CD, DL	—	25	—	
Another Time, Another Place: Timeless Christian Classics	Released: February 26, 2008; Label: Sparrow; Format: CD, DL	—	21	—	
Reborn	Released: September 15, 2009; Label: E1; Format: CD, DL	—	28	—	
Called	Released: February 14, 2020; Label: Red Street/The Fuel; Format: CD, DL	—	—	—	
Avalon Worship (Deluxe)	Released September 30, 2022; Label: Red Street/The Fuel; Format: DL	-	-	-	

=== Christmas albums ===
Title	Album details	Peak chart positions			
Title	Album details	US	US Christ.	US Holiday	US Catalog
Joy: A Christmas Collection	Released: September 26, 2000; Label: Sparrow; Format: CD	115	3	13	9

=== Compilation albums ===
Title	Album details	Peak chart positions		
Title	Album details	US	US Christ.	US Dance
O2: Avalon Remixed	Released: March 26, 2002; Label: Sparrow; Format: CD	—	19	2
Testify to Love: The Very Best of Avalon	Released: March 25, 2003; Label: Sparrow; Format: CD	112	9	—
Avalon: The Greatest Hits	Released: February 10, 2009; Label: Sparrow; Format: CD, DL	—	—	—
Number Ones	Released: August 28, 2012; Label: Sparrow; Format: CD, DL	—	—	—
20th Century Masters – The Millennium Collection: The Best of Avalon	Released: May 4, 2014; Label: Sparrow; Format: CD, DL	—	—	—

=== Singles ===
Year	Title	Peak positions			Album
Year	Title	US Christ.	US Christ. AC	US Insp.	Album
1996	"Give It Up"	—	1	—	Avalon
1997	"The Greatest Story"	—	4	—	Avalon
1997	"Picture Perfect World"	—	1	1	Avalon
1997	"This Love"	—	1	—	Avalon
1997	"Angels We Have Heard on High"	—	34	—	God with Us
1998	"Testify to Love"	—	1	—	A Maze of Grace
1998	"Adonai"	—	1	1	A Maze of Grace
1998	"Knockin' on Heaven's Door"	—	1	—	A Maze of Grace
1998	"Reason Enough"	—	1	—	A Maze of Grace
1999	"In Not Of"	—	1	—	In a Different Light
1999	"Take You at Your Word"	—	1	—	In a Different Light
1999	"Can't Live a Day"	—	1	1	In a Different Light
2000	"Always Have, Always Will"	—	1	—	In a Different Light
2000	"Fly to You"	—	1	—	Jesus: The Epic Mini Series
2001	"Don't Save It All for Christmas Day"	—	2	—	Joy: A Christmas Collection
2001	"Light a Candle"	—	—	—	Joy: A Christmas Collection
2001	"We Are the Reason"	—	—	—	Joy: A Christmas Collection
2001	"Jesus, Born on This Day"	—	—	—	Joy: A Christmas Collection
2001	"The Glory"	—	1	—	Oxygen
2001	"Come and Fill My Heart"	—	—	1	Oxygen
2001	"Wonder Why"	—	1	—	Oxygen
2002	"I Don't Want to Go"	—	1	—	Oxygen
2002	"Undeniably You"	—	1	—	Oxygen
2002	"Undeniably You (Jeff Savage Mix)"	—	—	—	O2: Avalon Remixed
2003	"Everything to Me"	3	1	—	Testify to Love: The Very Best of Avalon
2003	"New Day"	5	1	—	Testify to Love: The Very Best of Avalon
2004	"All"	8	2	—	The Creed
2004	"You Were There"	29	—	2	The Creed
2005	"I Wanna Be with You"	26	—	—	The Creed
2006	"Love Won't Leave You"	22	—	—	Stand
2006	"Orphans of God"	—	—	5	Stand
2006	"Somehow You Are"	—	—	—	Stand
2007	"In Christ Alone"	—	—	—	Faith: A Hymns Collection
2007	"God Is in Control"	—	—	—	Another Time, Another Place
2007	"Another Time, Another Place"	—	—	—	Another Time, Another Place
2008	"We Will Stand"	—	—	—	Another Time, Another Place
2009	"Still My God"	—	1	—	Avalon: The Greatest Hits
2009	"Arise"	—	1	—	Reborn
2009	"Alive"	—	—	—	Reborn
2019	"Majesty"	—	—	—	non-album single
2019	"Keeper of My Heart"	29	—	—	Called
2020	"Closer"	—	1	—	Called
2020	"If Not for Jesus"	—	—	—	Called
2020	"Called"	—	—	—	Called
2020	"Only One"	—	—	—	Called

=== Live albums ===
Title	Album details	Peak chart positions		
Title	Album details	US	US Christ.	US Heat.
Testify to Love: Live in Concert	Released: November 18, 2003 (DVD); 2008 (CD); Label: Sparrow; Format: CD, DVD	—	—	—
Avalon Live! A Hits Collection	Released: February 26, 2008; Label: Sparrow; Format: DVD	—	—	—

=== Music videos ===
- 2000: "In Not Of" music video
- 2006: "In Christ Alone" music video; featured in Tribute to Ruth Graham
- 2019: "Keeper of My Heart" music video

== Awards and nominations ==
Year	Awards	Category	Work	Result
1998	American Songwriter Professional Songwriter Awards	Artist of the Year	Avalon	Won
1998	American Songwriter Professional Songwriter Awards	Song of the Year	"Testify to Love"	Won
1998	CRR (Christian Research Report)	No. 1 AC Song of the Year	"Testify to Love"	Won
1998	CRR (Christian Research Report)	Group of the Year	Avalon	Won
1998	GMA Dove Awards	Best New Artist	Avalon	Won
1998	GMA Dove Awards	Special Event Album of the Year	God with Us	Won
1999	CRR (Christian Research Report)	No. 1 AC Song of the Year	"Reason Enough"	Won
1999	GMA Dove Awards	Artist of the Year	Avalon	Nominated
1999	GMA Dove Awards	Group of the Year	Avalon	Nominated
1999	GMA Dove Awards	Long Form Music Video	My Utmost for His Highest	Won
1999	GMA Dove Awards	Pop/Contemporary Album of the Year	A Maze of Grace	Nominated
1999	GMA Dove Awards	Inspirational Song of the Year	"Adonai"	Won
1999	GMA Dove Awards	Pop/Contemporary Song of the Year	"Testify to Love"	Won
2000	Christian Booksellers Association	Top-Selling Christmas Recording	Joy: A Christmas Collection	Won
2000	GMA Dove Awards	Artist of the Year	Avalon	Nominated
2000	GMA Dove Awards	Group of the Year	Avalon	Nominated
2000	GMA Dove Awards	Song of the Year	"Can't Live a Day"	Nominated
2000	GMA Dove Awards	Pop/Contemporary Song of the Year	"Can't Live a Day"	Nominated
2000	GMA Dove Awards	Pop/Contemporary Album of the Year	In a Different Light	Nominated
2001	GMA Dove Awards	Group of the Year	Avalon	Nominated
2001	GMA Dove Awards	Special Event Album of the Year	Child of the Promise	Nominated
2001	GMA Dove Awards	Special Event Album of the Year	Music from and Inspired by Jesus: The Epic Mini-Series	Nominated
2001	43rd Annual Grammy Awards	Best Pop/Contemporary Gospel Album	Joy: A Christmas Collection	Nominated
2002	CCM Reader's Choice Awards	Group of the Year	Avalon	Won
2002	GMA Dove Awards	Group of the Year	Avalon	Nominated
2002	GMA Dove Awards	Pop/Contemporary Album of the Year	Oxygen	Nominated
2002	GMA Dove Awards	Song of the Year	"The Glory"	Nominated
2002	GMA Dove Awards	Inspirational Recorded Song of the Year	"The Glory"	Nominated
2002	44th Annual Grammy Awards	Best Pop/Contemporary Gospel Album	Oxygen	Nominated
2003	American Music Awards (January)	Favorite Contemporary Inspirational Artist	Avalon	Won
2003	CCM Reader's Choice Awards	Group of the Year	Avalon	Won
2004	CCM Reader's Choice Awards	Group of the Year	Avalon	Won
2004	GMA Dove Awards	Song of the Year	"Everything to Me"	Nominated
2004	GMA Dove Awards	Inspirational Song of the Year	"Everything to Me"	Won
2005	47th Annual Grammy Awards	Best Pop/Contemporary Gospel Album	The Creed	Nominated
2007	GMA Dove Awards	Children's Album of the Year	Sing Over Me	Nominated
2007	GMA Dove Awards	Inspirational Song of the Year	"Orphans of God"	Nominated
2008	GMA Dove Awards	Special Event Album	Amazing Grace: Music Inspired by the Motion Picture	Nominated
