= Jadyn Douglas =

Puerto Rican singer

- Also known as: Jadyn Maria
- Born: San Juan, Puerto Rico
- Origin: Nashville, Tennessee, U.S.
- Genres: Pop; R&B
- Occupations: Singer; actress
- Years active: 2002–present
- Labels: EMI/CMG; Universal Motown
- Member of: Arten Way

Jadyn Douglas is a Puerto Rican singer. At the age of seventeen, she was signed to EMI and later to Universal Motown in 2008, releasing a few singles to little commercial success. Douglas then started a country-pop trio with her sister (Jaclyn) and brother-in-law (Blake) in 2014 called Arten Way.

At the same time, she began taking roles as an actress and in 2015 was cast in a supporting role for Eva Longoria's Telenovela on NBC.

== Life and career ==
Jadyn Douglas was born Joy Lynn Strand Pas in San Juan, Puerto Rico but grew up in Nashville, Tennessee from age two. She was the first daughter born to Southern Baptist pastor Dan Strand, and wife Rosa. Her father is American of English, Scottish, and Dutch descent, and her mother is Puerto Rican. Her family's Christian background meant that she was immersed in Christian music. She began singing in church from age two. At 17 Jadyn was signed to EMI/CMG, after being spotted singing at a wedding. She later appeared on the debut album by former Christian band Avalon member Jody McBrayer. She was also asked to record a cover of "With or Without You" with hip-hop group GRITS on the U2 tribute album In the Name of Love: Artists United for Africa.

After being spotted by an ad agency, Jadyn and one of her songs, "Rock You Senseless", were featured in Clairol's 2004 Herbal Essence campaign. She also appeared on What I Like About You as part of the campaign.

In 2007, Jadyn signed a songwriting deal with Universal Music Publishing Group, which led to her meeting with R&B musician Ne-Yo's manager and then Ne-Yo himself, eventually signing with his label and Universal Motown after auditioning for its president in 2008. She was the first artist signed to Ne-Yo's label, Compound Entertainment and was an opening act for his tour. Jadyn appeared in her friend, pop singer Katy Perry's music video for "Hot n Cold" as a bridesmaid. She also co-wrote the title bonus track from Ashley Tisdale's album Guilty Pleasure. The single, "Good Girls Like Bad Boys" was released in 2009 and featured rapper Flo Rida. Another single, "Trenchcoat and Shades" was released digitally in the UK. One of her songs "Catwalk V-O-G-U-E" was featured on an episode of the reality series The Hills and later covered by German girl group Monrose.

Jadyn was married to her high school boyfriend, Chad Hiner. The couple later divorced. She is currently married to model Andre Douglas, and the couple have two children – twins, Legend and Eliana.

Under the name Jadyn Douglas she began taking acting jobs in 2011. In 2014, she launched a Kickstarter campaign to fund a seven-song EP for her country-music band Arten Way, which is composed of her, her sister, and her brother-in-law.

== Discography ==
=== Singles ===
Year	Single
2002	"Never Alone” (with Jody McBrayer)
2004	"Rock You Senseless”
2009	"Good Girls Like Bad Boys" (featuring Flo Rida)
2009	"Trenchcoat & Shades"

=== Music videos ===
Year	Single	Director
2009	"Good Girls Like Bad Boys"	Claire Carre

== Filmography ==
Year	Title	Role	Notes
2005	What I Like About You	Herbal Essence Auditioner Commercial	Season 3 Episode 5 – Split Ends
2014	Taxi Brooklyn	Vanessa (as Jadyn Douglas)	Episode 102 – Brooklyn Heights
2015	Telenovela	Roxy Rios	Main Role
