= Shaun Shankel =

Shaun Shankel is an American Grammy nominated, Dove Award winning songwriter and record producer, who has written and produced for some of the biggest selling artists in the pop and Christian and Country music markets, selling over seven million albums and singles. He has had 12 No. 1 hits and song placements in over 18 film, television and commercial campaigns.

== Early life ==
Shankel grew up playing music in his family and with his grandfather on harmonica (he made several albums singing in a quartet with the Gospel Harolds), his father on guitar and Shaun on piano, they would sing and harmonize old hymns. He started studying piano professionally at 7 and by 10 was writing and performing his own songs in school. He attended Noblesville High School, where he wrote for the glee club and played in several Indianapolis area rock bands. Shaun went to Indiana University Bloomington and graduated with a double degree in Audio Technology and Music and Telecommunications. Also while at school, he wrote music for television shows on the PBS affiliate, WTUI. He received a Master of Business Administration from West Virginia University.

== Music career ==
After college, Shankel moved to Nashville, Tennessee, to work for writer/producer Keith Thomas, in various capacities. He assisted him in all aspects including engineering, writing and production management. During that time he also worked with Vanessa Williams, Amy Grant, Mandy Moore, 98 Degrees, and Michael Bolton.

After five years, Shankel decided to leave and pursue his own production career, and set up shop at Lealand Studios.

During the next few years, Shankel became one of the most sought after producer/writers. Some of the artists he has worked with include Kimberley Locke, Hilary Duff, Clay Aiken, Nicholas Jonas (and the Jonas Brothers) Jadyn Maria (Herbal Essences national campaign), RJ Helton, Natalie Grant, Mandisa, Chronicles of Narnia, Rebecca St. James, Jump 5, Tyler Hilton, Mark Schultz, Plumb, Avalon, ZOEGirl, Michael English and For King & Country.

During this time he also spotted a talent in songwriter in Kyle Jacobs and signed him to a joint venture, Fortune Favors the Bold Music Publishing, with Curb Music Publishing. Jacobs has recorded with Tim McGraw, Kellie Pickler and Garth Brooks, whose Jacobs penned hit single, "More Than a Memory", is the only song in history to debut at #1 on the country charts.

In 2005, Shankel signed with Warner Chappell Music and while pursuing his own projects created another joint venture, Shankel Songs and signed Ben Glover, Billboard's Christian writer of the Year, 2010, Joy Williams of The Civil Wars, and For King & Country: The EP, whom he also produced.

== Discography ==
Year	Album	Artist	Credit
1995	Greatest Hits	Expose	Production Coordination
1996	Kissing Rain	Roch Voisine	Production Coordination
1996	NBA at 50: A Musical Celebration	Various Artists	Production Coordination
1996	Miracle	Puff Johnson	Production Coordination
1996	This is the Time: Christmas Album	Michael Bolton	Production Coordination
1997	Takes a Little Time	Amy Grant	Production Coordination
1997	Speed 2: Cruise Control	Original Soundtrack	Production Coordination
1997	We Need a Little Christmas	Andy Williams	Engineer
1997	Next	Vanessa Williams	Production Coordination
1997	Behind the Eyes	Amy Grant	Production Coordination
1997	Anytime	Brian McKnight	Digital Editing
1997	One Night with You: The Best of Love, Vol. 2	Luther Vandross	Production Coordination
1997	All that Matters	Michael Bolton	Digital Editing
1997	Faith of Our Fathers	Various Artists	Producer
1998	Yours Faithfully	Rebbie Jackson	Production Coordination
1998	Audra & Alayna	Audra & Alayna	Production Coordination
1998	Everything's Gonna Be Alright	Deana Carter	Digital Editing, Production Coordination
1998	Touched By an Angel: The Album	Original TV Soundtrack	Production Coordination
1998	Greatest Hits: The First Ten Years	Vanessa Williams	Production Coordination
1999	Mountain High…Valley Low	Yolanda Adams	Production Coordination
2000	Center Stage (Sony)	Original Soundtrack	Editing, Production Coordination
2000	I Wanna Be With You	Mandy Moore	Editing, Digital Editing, Production Coordination
2000	At Last	Gladys Knight	Production Coordination
2001	Jump5	Jump5	Digital Editing
2003	Beautiful Lumps of Coal	Plumb	Engineer, Programming, Producer, String Arrangements
2003	Simple Things	Amy Grant	Production Coordination
2003	For You	Jonathan Pierce	Producer, Digital Editing, Engineer, Synthesizer
2003	WOW Hits 2004	Various Artists	Producer
2003	Ultimate Christmas Hits, Vol. 2: This is Christmas	Various Artists	Arranger, Producer
2004	8th World Wonder	Kimberly Locke	Audio Production, Arranger, Producer
2004	Real Life	RJ Helton	Arranger, Synthesizer Programming, Engineer, Producer, Sound Design, Digital Editing, Vocals (Background), String Arrangements
2004	One Love	Kimberly Locke	Keyboards, Vocal Arrangement, Digital Editing, Bass, Keyboard Programming, Producer, Arranger, Drum Programming, Engineer, Programming
2004	Even More	Anthony Evans	Percussion, Keyboards, Piano, Arranger, Producer, Engineer, Digital Editing, Audio Production, Programming, String Arrangements
2004	Dreaming in Color	Jump5	Producer, Engineer, Synthesizer Programming, Digital Editing, Audio Production, Audio Engineer
2004	Hilary Duff	Hilary Duff	Mixing, Producer
2004	Best of Mandy Moore	Mandy Moore	Pro-Tools, Production Coordination
2005	You Raise Me Up (Curb)	Various Artists	Producer
2005	Love Rocks (Centaur)	Various Artists	Composer, Producer
2005	Undisguised	Kara Williamson	Composer
2005	Room to Breathe	ZOEgirl	writer/producer on: "About You" Keyboards, Composer
2005	Very Best of Jump5	Jump5	Producer, Audio Production
2005	Awaken	Natalie Grant	Keyboards, String Arrangements, Piano, Composer, Engineer, Producer, Arranger, Digital Editing. Producer: "Held", "What Are You Waiting For", "Another Day", writer/producer: "Bring It All Together"
2005	Women & Songs, Vol. 8 (Bonus DVD)	Various Artists	Composer
2005	Absolute Smash Hits, Vol. 2	Various Artists	Producer, Composer
2005	Music Inspired by the Chronicles of Narnia	Original Soundtrack	Composer, Producer, Keyboards, Arranger, Engineer, Programming, String Arrangements
2005	WOW Hits 2006	Various Artists	Composer, Producer
2005	If I Had One Chance to Tell You Something	Rebecca St. James	Audio Production, Programming, Engineer, Composer, Producer, Arranger, String Arrangements. songs, "I Need You", "Forgive Me", "Beautiful Stranger", "I Can Trust You"
2005	With All of My Heart: The Greatest Hits	ZOEgirl	Composer, Producer
2006	Absolute Modern Worship (2006)	Various Artists	Producer
2006	Stand	Avalon	Digital Editing, Producer, Composer, Arranger, String Arrangements, Engineer, Piano, Programming, Keyboards
2006	Chaotic Resolve	Plumb	Composer: "Better", "Jeckle & Hyde"
2006	WOW Worship: Aqua	Various Artists	Producer
2006	24 (2003)	Point of Grace	Drum Programming, Bass, Synthesizer, Overdub Engineer, Producer
2006	Absolute All Time Favorites	Various Artists	Producer
2006	Greatest Hits: In Christ Alone	Michael English	String Arrangements, Producer, Arranger, Keyboards
2006	Broken & Beautiful	Mark Schultz	Composer, Programming, Digital Editing, Engineer, Keyboards, Arranger
2006	WOW Hits 2007	Various Artists	Producer
2006	Faith: A Hymns Collection	Avalon	Producer, Programming, Engineer
2007	Worship Together: Favorites	Various Artists	Producer
2007	Gifted: Season One	Various Artists	Producer, Keyboards, Arranger, Programming, Digital Editing
2007	Alive in Florida (CD/DVD)	Rebecca St. James	Composer
2007	Only the World	Mandisa	Producer, Vocal Arrangement, Arranger, Engineer, Digital Editing. "Only the World", "Only You"
2007	True Beauty	Mandisa	Composer, Vocal Producer, Digital Editing, Programming, Producer, Engineer, Audio Production
2007	WOW Hits 2008	Various Artists	Producer
2007	Blink	Plumb	Composer, "My Sweet, My Lovely", "Always"
2007	Indigo Dying	Indigo Dying	Composer
2008	Grace Was Free	Danielle Marshall	Composer
2008	Two For One: Accelerate/Dreaming in Color	Jump5	Audio Production
2008	Two For One: Room to Breathe/With All of My Heart	ZOEgirl Composer, Producer	
2008	Relentless	Natalie Grant	Engineer, Programming, Arranger, Keyboards, Digital Editing, Piano, Producer, Composer on: "Perfect People", "Wonderful Life", "Safe", "Let Go"
2008	Another Time, Another Place: Timeless Christian Classics	Avalon	Producer, Engineer, String Arrangements, Programming, Arranger, Digital Editing
2008	Prodigal Comes Home	Michael English	String Arrangements, Arranger, Keyboards, Producer
2008	Ultimate Collection	Rebecca St. James	Producer, Composer
2008	Phil Stacey	Phil Stacey	Composer, "What I'm Fighting For"
2008	Rynn	Rynn	Composer
2008	Awaken/Deeper Life	Natalie Grant	Digital Editing, Composer, Keyboards, Producer, Piano, Arranger, Engineer, String Arrangements
2008	Chaotic Resolve/Beautiful Lumps of Coal	Plumb	Producer, String Arrangements, Engineer, Programming, Composer
2008	WOW Essentials: All-Time Favorite Christian Songs	Various Artists	Producer
2008	Natalie Grant Collector's Edition	Natalie Grant	String Arrangements, Composer, Arranger, Engineer, Piano, Keyboards, Producer, Digital Editing
2008	Greatest Hits	Jump5	Producer
2008	Greatest Hits	ZOEgirl	Composer, Producer
2008	Mark Schultz Gift Tin	Mark Schultz	Keyboards, Digital Editing, Composer, Programming, Producer, Arranger, Engineer
2009	Better Together: 17 Hit Duets and Collaborations by Your Favorite Christian Artists	Various Artists	Producer, Composer
2009	Crazy Days	Adam Gregory	Composer
2009	Dare to Love: Songs of Unconditional Love for Couples	Various Artists	Producer
2009	Love, Save the Empty	Erin McCarley	Composer, "Bobblehead"
2009	Greatest Hits	Avalon	Producer
2009	Ultimate Collection	ZOEgirl	Composer, Producer
2009	Gnome Groove	DJ Kimberly S.	Composer
2009	Let Your Love Out	Luke Benward	Keyboards, Bass, Composer, Digital Editing, Engineer, Arranger, Producer
2009	Stand/The Creed	Avalon	Composer, Producer
2009	Come Alive	Mark Schultz	String Arrangements, Keyboards, Producer, Bass
2009	Beautiful History: A Hits Collection (2 Disc)	Plumb	Composer
2009	Workout & Worship	Various Artists	Producer
2010	Christian Music's Best: Pop	Various Artists	Producer
2010	Singer Songwriter Collection	Amy Grant	Production Coordination
2010	Love Like Crazy	Lee Brice	Composer, "Picture of Me"
2010	WOW: Best of 2004	Various Artists	Producer
2010	WOW: Best of 2007	Various Artists	Producer
2010	Pawn Shop Kings	Revolution	Universal/Stetson
2011	For King & Country	Busted Heart EP	Producer/writer
2011	Sidewalk Prophets	Deluxe Edition	Word Records/Curb/Warner Brothers
2012	For King & Country	Crave	Producer/writer
2014	Nashville (The TV Show) Episode 214	Is That Who I Am?	Writer (Sung by Will)
