= Keep Breathing (album) =

Studio album by Jody McBrayer
- Released: February 12, 2016
- Genres: Worship, Christian pop
- Length: 43:36
- Label: StowTown

Keep Breathing is a studio album by Jody McBrayer. StowTown Records released the album on February 12, 2016.

== Critical reception ==
Professional ratings
Review scores
Source	Rating
CCM Magazine	4/5 stars
The Christian Beat	4/5 stars
Cross Rhythms	8/10 squares
New Release Today	3.5/5 stars
The Phantom Tollbooth	3.5/5 stars
Today's Christian Entertainment	3.8/5 stars

Awarding the album four stars at CCM Magazine, Andy Argyrakis states, "Any of the above would’ve fit right beside his memorable material from the ‘90s, though they avoid sounding dated thanks to McBrayer’s well-preserved voice that transcends specific eras." Michael Dalton, affixing a three and a half out of five rating upon the album for The Phantom Tollbooth, describes, "This is a strong comeback, one that will appeal to Avalon fans and anyone that appreciates faith-inspired music." Giving the album three and a half stars from New Release Today, Marcus Hathcock writes, "Keep Breathing is a milestone for McBrayer that could only improve with some more variety in the production and arrangements."

Sarah Baylor, allotting the album a four star review by The Christian Beat, says, "Keep Breathing displays Jody McBrayer’s unique vocal range and abilities. Most importantly, the album is filled with a message of truth and hope. Overall, the record is an upbeat, gospel, contemporary blend which is extremely unique to the Christian music industry today." Kelly Meade, allocating the album a 3.8 star rating from Today's Christian Entertainment, writes, "Throughout Keep Breathing, Jody McBrayer gives a near flawless vocal performance on songs with lyrics that speak to the hearts of listeners capturing your attention from start to finish." Indicating in an eight out of ten review from Cross Rhythms, Stephen Curry says, "This is an excellently produced comeback album with many highlights and great melodies."

== Track listing ==
No.	Title	Length
1.	"Good to Be Home"	3:35
2.	"Only You (I Speak Your Name)"	4:22
3.	"What It Takes to Be a Savior"	4:40
4.	"God Is in Control"	4:06
5.	"Keep Breathing"	3:22
6.	"In the Presence of Jesus"	4:02
7.	"Me"	4:02
8.	"With Each Borrowed Breath"	3:59
9.	"When We Look Back"	3:17
10.	"He Gave Me More Love"	4:16
11.	"This Is a Son"	3:55
Total length:		43:36
