= Chris McHugh =

American drummer (born 1964)

Chris McHugh (born 1964) is an American musician from Oaklyn, NJ. He began his career as the drummer of Christian rock band White Heart from 1986 to 1989. McHugh toured and played as a session drummer with artists such as Aaron Neville, Peter Frampton, Jewel (singer), Alabama (band) Kenny Rogers, LeAnn Rimes, Brooks & Dunn and numerous others. His recording credits span over 40 years with 93 platinum and 15 gold certifications. Cited: Credits, Muso

Chris McHugh is on the Nashville "A" list of session drummers with over 3200 credits, 24 billion streams and has played live on several genres with country and pop artists of the music industry. He has toured with Amy Grant, Michael W. Smith, and Garth Brooks. McHugh has toured as Music Director/drummer for Keith Urban and has been the session drummer for seven of Urban's studio albums.

McHugh’s live TV performances include: Grammy Award shows, Golden Globes, SNL, Super Bowl pregame, The Today show, Late Night with Jimmy Fallon, Country Music Awards, and many more.

== Discography ==
Platinum Hits:

•“Never say Never”- Cole Swindell

•“Leave the night on.”- Sam Hunt

•”South bound” “Heartbeat” “Cowboy Casanova” “Just a dream” “Blown away” “Church bells” “Cry pretty” “Two black Cadillacs” “Good Girl” “Little Toy Guns” “Something in the Water” “See you again” “I told you so” “Undo it”- Carrie Underwood

•“God gave me you.” And “She wouldn’t be gone.”-Blake Shelton

•“Somebody like You” “Long hot summer” “Cop Car”- Keith Urban

• “We are tonight” “Don’t it.” “Do I make you wanna” “Hey girl” “It don’t hurt like it used to”-Billy Currington

• “Wasting all these tears”- Cassadee Pope

• “Easy” “What hurts the most.” “Life is Highway” “My wish”-Rascal Flatts

• “Bottoms up”- Brantley Gilbert

• “Cool anymore”- Julia Michaels & Jordan Davis (singer)

• “Boondocks” - Little Big Town

• “Dancing on the ceiling” - Lionel Richie Rascal Flatts

=== Albums ===
- White Heart - Don't Wait For the Movie (1986)
- White Heart - Emergency Broadcast (1987)
- White Heart - Freedom (1989)
- Gaither Vocal Band - Wings (1988)
- David Mullen - Revival (1989)
- Amy Grant - Heart in Motion (1991)
- White Heart - Tales of Wonder (1992)
- Rich Mullins - A Liturgy, A Legacy & A Ragamuffin Band (1993)
- Bob Carlisle - Bob Carlisle (1993)
- Amy Grant - House of Love (1994)
- 4Him - The Ride (1994)
- David Mullen - David Mullen (1994)
- PFR - Great Lengths (1994)
- Michael W. Smith - I'll Lead You Home (1995)
- Charlie Peacock - Strangelanguage (1996)
- Rich Mullins - Songs (1996)
- Avalon - Avalon (1996)
- 4Him - The Message (1996)
- Steven Curtis Chapman - Signs of Life (1996)
- Various Artists - Amazing Grace, Vol. 2: A Country Salute to Gospel (1997)
- Peter Cetera - You're the Inspiration: A Collection (1997)
- Amy Grant - Behind the Eyes (1997)
- Owsley - Owsley (1999)
- Keith Urban - Keith Urban (1999)
- Garth Brooks - In the Life Of Chris Gaines (1999)
- Rachael Lampa - Live for You (2000)
- Aaron Neville - Devotion (2000)
- Billy Ray Cyrus - Southern Rain (2000)
- Carman - Heart of a Champion (2000)
- Jeff Carson - Real Life (2001)
- Jonell Mosser - Enough Rope (2001)
- Jewel - This Way (2001)
- Various Artists - Country Goes Raffi (2001)
- Alabama - When It All Goes South (2001)
- Lonestar - I'm Already There (2001)
- Trace Adkins - Chrome (2001)
- Peter Cetera - Another Perfect World (2001)
- Plus One - Obvious (2002)
- True Vibe - See The Light (2002)
- Lee Ann Womack - Something Worth Leaving Behind (2002)
- Keith Urban - Golden Road (2002)
- Rhett Akins - Friday Night in Dixie (2002)
- Faith Hill - Cry (2002)
- Chris Cagle - Chris Cagle (2003)
- Craig Morgan - Love It (2003)
- Michael Bolton - Greatest Hits 1985–1995 (2003)
- Phil Vassar - American Child (Bonus Tracks) (2003)
- Sherrié Austin - Streets of Heaven (2003)
- Wynonna Judd - What the World Needs Now Is Love (2003)
- Rodney Atkins - Honesty (2003)
- Jars of Clay - Who We Are Instead (2003)
- Peter Frampton - Now (2003)
- Amy Grant - Simple Things (2003)
- Natalie Grant - Deeper Life (2003)
- Andy Chrisman - One (2004)
- Owsley - Hard Way (2004)
- Michelle Wright - Shut Up & Kiss Me (Can) (2004)
- Kenny Rogers - 42 Ultimate Hits (2004)
- Keith Urban - Be Here (2004)
- LaShell Griffin - Free (2004)
- Lonestar - Coming Home (2005)
- Jamie O'Neal - Brave (2005)
- Chely Wright - Metropolitan Hotel (2005)
- Keith Anderson - Three Chord Country and American Rock & Roll (2005)
- Trick Pony - R.I.D.E. (2005)
- Little Big Town - The Road to Here (2005)
- Keith Urban - Days Go By: Anthology (2005)
- Carrie Underwood - Some Hearts (2005)
- Faith Hill - Fireflies (2005)
- Natalie Grant - Awaken (2005)
- Keith Urban - Take 2 (2002) (Keith Urban & Golden Road)
- 4Him - Encore: For Future Generations (2006)
- LeAnn Rimes - Whatever We Wanna (2006)
- Trace Adkins - Dangerous Man (2006)
- Rascal Flatts - Me and My Gang (2006)
- Keith Urban - Love, Pain & the Whole Crazy Thing (2006)
- Carrie Underwood - Carnival Ride (2007)
- Brooks & Dunn - Cowboy Town (2007)
- LeAnn Rimes - Family (2007)
- Keith Urban - Greatest Hits: 18 Kids (2007)
- Blake Shelton - Startin' Fires (2008)
- Keith Anderson - C'mon! (2008)
- Billy Ray Cyrus - Back to Tennessee (2009)
- Keith Urban - Defying Gravity (2009)
- Martina McBride - Shine (2009)
- Rascal Flatts - Unstoppable (2009)
- Pat Green - What I'm For (2009)
- Keith Urban - Get Closer (2010)
- Martel - The Prelude EP (2013)
- Niko Moon - Good Time (2021)

=== DVDs ===
- Keith Urban - Livin' Right Now (2005)
- Trace Adkins - Dangerous Man [CD/DVD] (2006)
- Keith Urban - Love, Pain and the Whole Crazy World Tour (2008)

=== Soundtracks ===
- Touched By an Angel: The Album (1998) - Television Soundtrack
- Joshua (2002) - Original Soundtrack
- Cars (2006) - Original Soundtrack

=== Music videos ===
- "You're My Better Half" (2005) - Keith Urban
- "Better Life" (2005) - Keith Urban
- "Once in a Lifetime" (2006) - Keith Urban
- "Stupid Boy" (2006) - Keith Urban
- "I Told You So" (2007) - Keith Urban
- "Everybody" (2007) - Keith Urban
- "You Look Good in My Shirt" (2008) - Keith Urban
- "Sweet Thing" (2008) - Keith Urban
- "Kiss a Girl" (2009) - Keith Urban
- "Hit the Ground Runnin'" (2009) - Keith Urban
- "Put You in a Song" (2010) - Keith Urban
- "Long Hot Summer" (2011) - Keith Urban
- "For You" (2011) - Keith Urban
