= GracePointe Church =

Church in Nashville, Tennessee, US

Coordinates: 35°57′55″N 86°50′05″W

GracePointe Church is a non-denominational church in Nashville, Tennessee, United States. Established in 2003 in Williamson County, the church received attention in 2015 after allowing LGBTQ people to become full members of the church. Following a drop in attendance and revenue, GracePointe moved to a rented venue in Nashville in 2017.

== History ==
GracePointe was founded in Williamson County in 2003 by Stan Mitchell.

In 2015, GracePointe extended full membership privileges to LGBTQ people. Previously, members of the church who were not heterosexual could not be on the church board or lead worship services or other church groups. LGBTQ members could be baptized and receive communion but were unable to get married or have their children dedicated in church. Following the changes in 2015, these restrictions were lifted. The church was one of the first evangelical megachurches in the US to openly support full equality for LGBTQ people. Within two months of this announcement, six out of the church's twelve board members had left; average weekly attendance, previously between 800 and 1000, dropped by a third, and the average offering dropped by half.

As a result of falling revenue, connected to their change in stance on LGBTQ issues, GracePointe sold its building to another evangelical church in 2017 and relocated to Nashville. Mitchell later said in a 2017 interview that he felt he should have given the church more input in the decision to change its stance on LGBTQ membership. In 2019, Stan Mitchell stepped down as lead pastor of the church and was replaced by Josh Scott.

== Beliefs ==
GracePointe advocates a version of progressive Christianity, which believes that the teachings of the Bible should be applied to the modern world by reinterpreting and re-examining historical teachings which reflect the time in which they were written. This includes acceptance towards LGBTQ people and same-sex relationships, as well as being willing to draw from sources of wisdom and spirituality from outside Christian teachings and trying to create an inclusive community.

In 2021, Josh Scott taught in a sermon that Christians should not think of the Bible as the word of God but rather see it as "a product of community, a library of texts, multi-vocal, a human response to God, living and dynamic." Subsequently, the church posted a summary of the sermon on Facebook which received mostly negative reactions from those who engaged with it. Scott expressed his surprise at the strength of the reaction to his sermon but responded by defending his position, arguing that some of the Bible's content includes material that contradicts the character of God.
