= 4Him =

Contemporary Christian music group

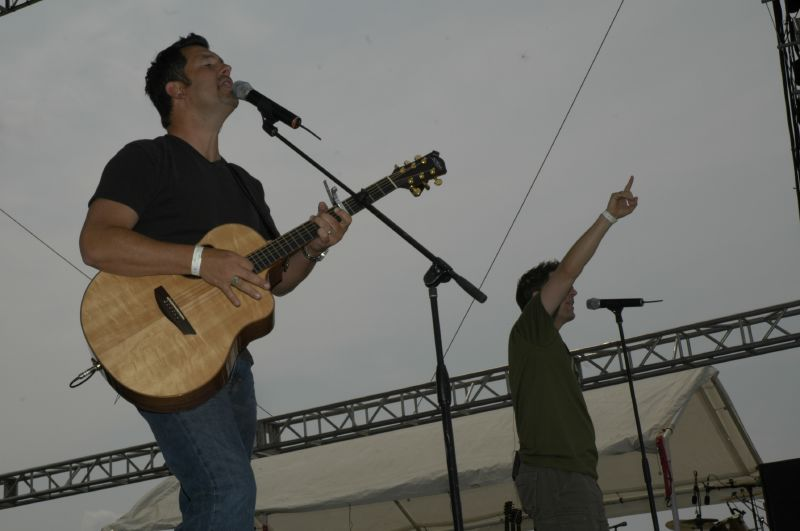
- 4Him plays at Lifest 2006

Background information
- Origin: Mobile, Alabama, U.S.
- Genres: Contemporary Christian
- Years active: 1990–2006 (Note: Reunions: 2009, 2010, 2013, 2015)
- Labels: Benson, Word, INO
- Spinoff of: Truth
- Past members: Andy Chrisman; Mark Harris; Marty Magehee; Kirk Sullivan

4Him was an American contemporary Christian music group founded in 1990 in Mobile, Alabama. The group has ten Dove awards, a Grammy nomination and three certified gold albums to their credit. The group was inducted into Alabama's Music Hall of Fame, following the awarding of The Governor's Achievement Award. The group has also been featured performers for popular Christian Evangelist crusaders, Billy Graham and Luis Palau.

4Him disbanded in 2006 to pursue individual careers of ministry and music. They have released 12 studio albums which have produced 27 number one singles.

The group has made sporadic reunion appearances since 2009.

== History ==
Andy Chrisman, Mark Harris, Marty Magehee, and Kirk Sullivan originally met when they sang together in Truth, a Contemporary Christian vocal group founded in 1971 and directed by Roger Breland. Truth had a rotating roster of four male and four female vocalists. After three representatives from Benson Records attended several Truth concerts in the late 1980s during which Andy, Mark, Marty, and Kirk performed, Benson approached the quartet saying that they wanted to use the guys to create a new male four-member vocal group under the Benson label. "Where There Is Faith", their first single, stayed at No. 1 on the charts for eight weeks, two months before 4Him left Truth. Releasing their self-titled debut in 1990, they blended the traditions of Christian music's past, with modern pop production and practical lyrics.

In 1996, with the release of The Message, 4Him changed their overall sound in an effort to keep pushing the creative limits of the group. The guys replaced the over-the-top orchestrations and choral vocal arrangements with a stripped down, acoustic band approach where one of the guys would sing lead and the other three would sing backing vocals. On 1998's Obvious, each member took more ownership of their music – becoming more involved in the production and songwriting aspects.

By 2004, all four of the guys reevaluated the future of the ministry. After close to seventeen years together, the members of 4Him decided to embark on solo careers. On September 23, 2006, they performed their final concert at Cottage Hill Baptist Church in Mobile, AL, the city where 4Him's 17-year journey first started. At that concert, various individuals (including family members, record producers, management, and Truth founder Roger Breland) were recognized for their contributions to 4Him's ministry.

== After disbandment ==
=== Andy Chrisman ===
Andy Chrisman released his freshman solo effort One in 2004, and is worship pastor at Church on the Move in Tulsa, Oklahoma. In 2008, he, along with the Church on the Move Praise Band, released Beautiful Name, a live worship CD.

=== Mark Harris ===
In 2005, Mark Harris released The Line Between the Two. In 2007, Harris won a GMA Dove Award in the category of Inspirational Song of the Year for "Find Your Wings". On September 25, 2007, he released his second album Windows and Walls on INO Records. On October 13, 2011, Harris released his third album Stronger In The Broken Places on Stylos Records. In 2012, Harris' song, "When We're Together" was featured in the film, Courageous. Until mid-2013, he served as artist-in-residence and worship pastor at Bay Community Church outside Mobile, Alabama. He currently serves as executive worship pastor at Gateway Church in Southlake, Texas.

=== Kirk Sullivan ===
In 2010, Kirk Sullivan released his independent solo release Timeless on his website. Timeless contains "Get Down Mountain" (previously featured on the Encore album), a new reworked arrangement of his trademark song "The Basics of Life", and a bonus track of a song recorded when he was twelve years old.

=== Marty Magehee ===
In 2008, Marty Magehee released his independent solo release, Open, on his website. The first single, "Eyes Wide Open", was released to Christian radio in May 2008. The album also included the song "Runaway Train", which appeared on 4Him's final CD, Encore. He is also producing albums for other artists. In 2011, Magehee is on the faculty of Valor Christian High School in Highlands Ranch, Colorado, teaching courses in Worship Band, Studio Recording, Beats and Loops, and Songwriting.

== Reunions ==
After nearly five years apart, the quartet made their first reunion on the K-Love Friends and Family Cruise in January 2009. A one-off concert in West Monroe, Louisiana took place in March, and another reunion happened on Kathy Troccoli's "KT and Friends Cruise" to Alaska in June 2010. In early 2013, they performed several concerts on a tour dubbed "With One Voice" together with the group Avalon and solo Christian singer songwriter Cindy Morgan. In September 2015, they performed an 11-city 25th anniversary tour.

== Discography ==
- 1990: 4Him
- 1991: Face the Nation
- 1992: The Basics of Life
- 1993: The Season of Love (Christmas)
- 1994: The Ride
- 1996: The Message
- 1998: Obvious
- 1999: Best Ones
- 2000: Hymns: A Place of Worship
- 2001: Chapter One... A Decade
- 2001: Walk On
- 2003: Visible
- 2004: Simply 4Him
- 2006: Encore... For Future Generations

Other album appearances

- 1990: Jesus - The Best Gift of All (various artists), "The Best Gift of All"
- 1992: Master Pieces (various artists), "Turn Your Radio On"
- 1993: The New Young Messiah (various artists), "The Trumpet Shall Sound"
- 1993: Chain of Grace, Dallas Holm (background vocals), "Chain of Grace", "Nothing Satisfies Me Like Jesus"
- 1993: Faith Hope & Love, Mylon LeFevre, "Give Thanks"
- 1995: Hymns & Voices, various artists "All Hail the Power of Jesus' Name"
- 1995: My Utmost for His Highest (various artists), "You Are Holy"
- 1997: Love and Mercy, Kathy Troccoli, "Love One Another"
- 1999: Streams (various artists), "The Only Thing I Need" (which included vocals by Jon Anderson of Yes)
- 1999: Bridges (various), "It's Gonna Rain", featuring The Canton Spirituals
- 2000: Pure Hymns: The John Tesh Project, featured on "How Great Thou Art"
- 2000: Hope Changes Everything (various artists), "Broken"
- 2003: WOW Worship: Yellow (various artists), "Thy Word"

=== Video ===
- 1991: Face the Nation
- 1993: The Basics of Life
- 1995: The Ride Comes Alive
- 1996: The Message in the Making
- 2006: Encore (from the Encore Farewell Tour, recorded at Sherwood Baptist Church in Albany, Georgia)

== Awards and nominations ==
=== Grammys ===
- 1997: Grammy nomination – Best Pop/Contemporary Gospel Album for The Message

=== GMA Dove Awards ===
- 1991: New Artist of the Year
- 1993: Group of the Year
- 1993: Inspiration Album of the Year for Generation to Generation
- 1994: Group of the Year
- 1994: Inspirational Album of the Year For The Season of Love
- 1995: Group of the Year
- 1998: Inspirational Recorded Song of the Year for "Center of the Mark"
- 2003: Nomination for Inspirational Recorded Song of the Year for "Who You Are"

=== Other awards ===
- 1990: CRR (Christian Research Report) Reporter Poll – Best New Artist
- 1991: CRR (Christian Research Report) – Best Group
- 1992: CRR (Christian Research Report) – Best Group
- 1993: CBA Impact Award – Total Promotional Campaign, Music: The Basics of Life
- 1994: CCM Magazine – Song of the Year: "For Future Generations"
- 1995: American Songwriter – Christian Artist of the Year
- 1996: CCM Readers' Poll – Favorite Long Form Video: The Ride Comes Alive

=== Other honors ===
- RIAA Certified Gold Album – The Basics of Life (1996)
- Featured performers with the Luis Palau crusade and the Billy Graham crusade
- Performed at "Sold Out 1998" Promise Keepers conference the day before the Super Bowl
- Co-host of the 1998 NCCAA (National Christian College Athletic Association) Bobby Clampett/4Him Pro-Am Classic Golf Tournament, and have co-hosted every year since
- The song "Ride of Life" was featured in chiptune form on a NES game by Wisdom Tree, on a cartridge which included their game Sunday Funday
