= Andy Chrisman =

American contemporary Christian musician

Andy Chrisman is a former member of the American contemporary Christian music group 4Him, a solo Christian music recording artist and a worship leader.

== Background ==
Chrisman originally met the other 4Him members when they sang together in Truth, a contemporary Christian vocal group founded in 1971 and directed by Roger Breland. Representatives from a record label heard the band a few times and signed them to become a Christian band. Their first single was "Where there is Faith".

After 4Him ended, Chrisman released his first solo recording, One, in 2004. He has also been a worship pastor at Church on the Move, in Tulsa, Oklahoma. In 2008, along with the Church on the Move Praise Band, he released Beautiful Name, a live worship CD. Chrisman was briefly the worship leader at Celebrate Church in Celebration, Florida until 2006.

Chrisman is the host of a podcast called "1 Degree of Andy." The podcast features interviews with CCM artists and industry figures from the 1970s to 2000s.

He is married to Jackie and they have two kids, Lucas and Kayleigh, as well as several grandchildren.
