= Greg Long (singer) =

American contemporary Christian singer

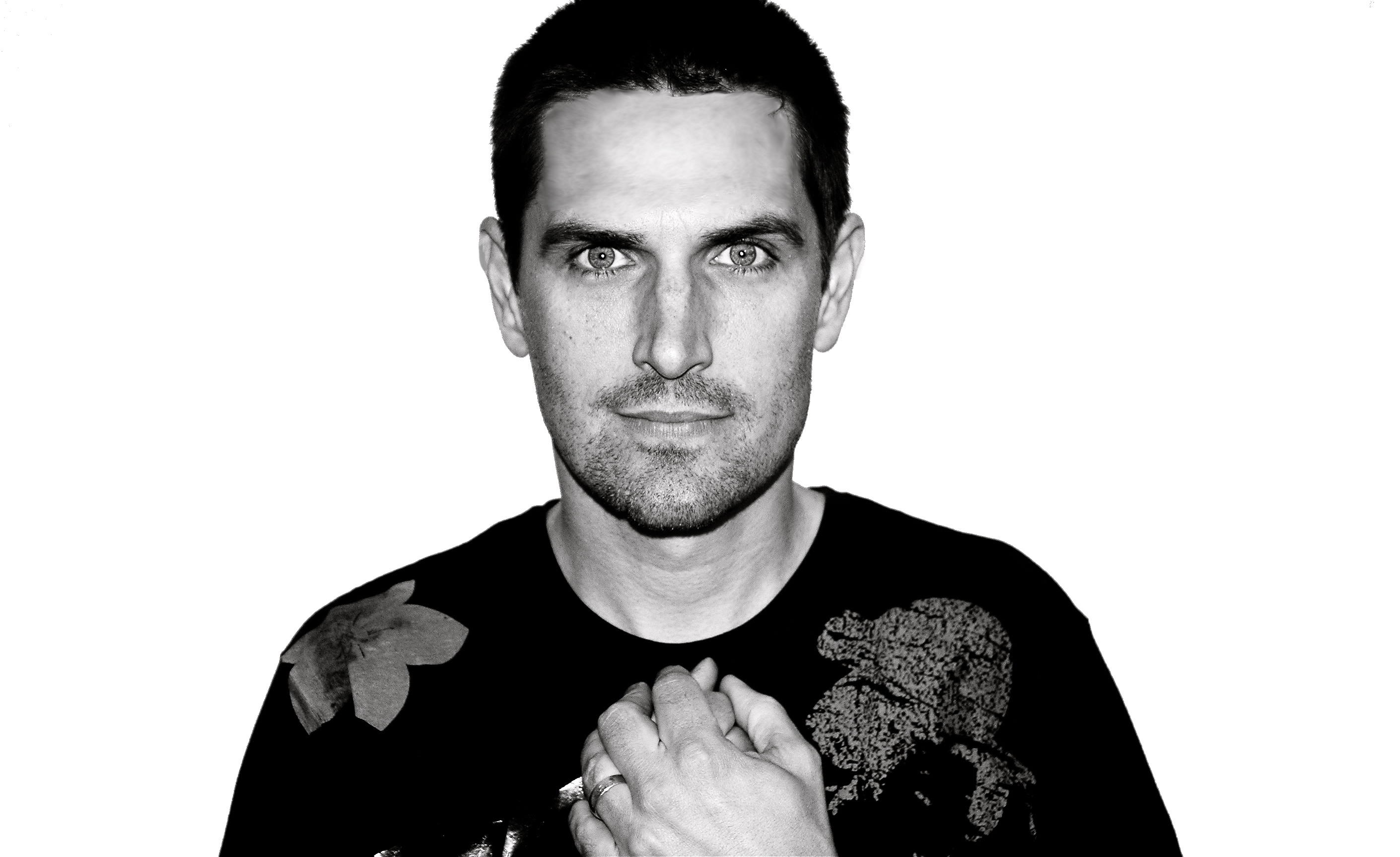

Background information
- Born: Gregory Alan Long; December 12, 1966 (age 59)
- Origin: Aberdeen, South Dakota, US
- Genres: Contemporary Christian music
- Occupations: Musician, songwriter
- Instrument: Vocals
- Years active: 1994–present
- Labels: Myrrh/Pakaderm, Word, Christian

Greg Long (born December 12, 1966) is an American contemporary Christian music solo artist and also a member of the contemporary Christian pop group Avalon.

== Background ==
Long was born in Aberdeen, South Dakota. He began singing at the age of 2, in his father's revivals. He is married to fellow Avalon band member Janna Long.

As a solo artist, Long has had eight songs reach No. 1 on the Contemporary Christian charts: "How Long?" (a duet with Margaret Becker) in 1994 from his first solo album, then "What a Friend" and "Think About Jesus" in 1995, "Love the Lord" in 1996, "We Love You Jesus", "Jesus Saves" and "Mercy Said No" in 1998, and "Sufficiency of Grace" in 2000 . Long was a 1998 GMA Dove Award nominee.

In 2003, Long joined Avalon, replacing founding member Michael Passons.

== Discography ==
- Cross My Heart (Myrrh Records/Pakaderm Records 1994)
- Days of Grace (Myrrh Records 1996)
- Jesus Saves (Word Records 1998)
- Now (Myrrh Records 2000)
- Born Again (Christian Records 2004)
- The Definitive Collection (Word Records 2008 compilation album)
