= Michael Passons =

American singer-songwriter

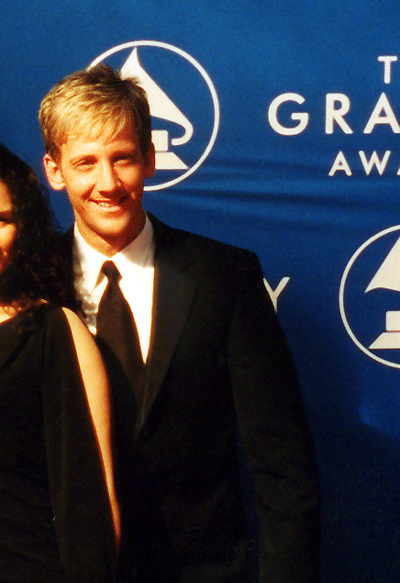
- Michael Passons, GRAMMY Awards red carpet

Background information
- Born: Robert Michael Passons; October 29, 1965 (age 60); Yazoo City, Mississippi, U.S.
- Origin: United States
- Genres: CCM/Worship/Pop
- Occupations: Musician; Songwriter; Composer
- Instrument: Piano
- Years active: 1995 – present
- Label: Capitol Music Group

Michael Passons is an American singer-songwriter and the founding member of the Christian band Avalon.

== Biography ==
Michael Passons was born and raised in Yazoo City, Mississippi, and as a toddler, began to sing and play piano. As a young musician, Passons was influenced by music from the small country church where his family attended, and also popular mainstream singer/piano player artists like Elton John and Lionel Richie. Michael went on to attend Mississippi College where he graduated with a degree in classical piano. He joined a college band his senior year, and after graduating, toured nationally several summers with a New Jersey–based band.

Passons moved to Nashville in 1990 and began working with fellow musicians. It was there that Grant Cunningham, a Sparrow Records (EMI) A&R director, caught his performance at a February 1995 Nashville showcase. This pivotal meeting led to Passons becoming the founding member of the Christian pop group, Avalon. The band made its debut in November 1995, in San Jose, California, at the start of the multi-city arena tour, "The Young Messiah," alongside such artists as Steven Curtis Chapman, CeCe Winans and Michael W. Smith.

This proved to be an excellent launching pad for Avalon who, during Passons' tenure, later garnered two gold records, twenty No. 1 radio singles, six GMA awards, two GRAMMY nominations, a 2003 American Music Award for, "Favorite Artist Contemporary Inspiration," and their hit song, "Testify to Love," would eventually be named one of the top Contemporary Christian music of all time.

After eight years with Avalon, Passons left the group in 2003. After years of public statements by Avalon to the contrary, Passons said in a 2020 podcast interview that he was forced out of the group because he was gay and that he ultimately refused to attend conversion therapy.

Since leaving Avalon, Michael has been an opening act on tour with fellow Christian group, Point of Grace. Passons and former Avalon bandmate Melissa Greene sang background vocals for country singer Ty Herndon and Broadway star Kristin Chenoweth for a new inclusive version of Avalon's 2006 song "Orphans of God" which was released October 2023.

On May 15, 2026, Passons, Ty Herndon, and Melissa Greene rereleased "Testify to Love" as a song about LGBT "inclusion." Both Passons and Greene have spoken to the song being a "restoration" for Passons. In an interview with GLAAD, Passons went on to say "It serves as a testimony that love does not exclude.” On her substack post about the release, Greene also announced that the three artists have filmed a forthcoming music video.
