= Jody McBrayer =

- Born: Jody Michael McBrayer; June 25, 1970 (age 56)
- Origin: United States
- Genres: CCM, Southern Gospel
- Occupations: Musician, songwriter
- Years active: 1995–2007, 2016–present
- Label: EMI/Sparrow

Jody McBrayer (born June 25, 1970) is an American singer/songwriter and a member of Christian pop groups Cana's Voice and Avalon.

== Career ==
McBrayer attended college at Liberty University. He got his start in contemporary Christian music right out of college in 1992 as a member of the vocal group Truth.

In 1994, McBrayer was a vocalist in Ray Conniff's Latin America tour.

In 1995, McBrayer joined the Christian contemporary group Avalon. He would go on to travel with the group for 12 years, during which the group released nine albums, garnered 21 No. 1 songs, three Grammy nominations and three Dove Awards.

In 2002, McBrayer released his first solo album, This Is Who I Am, with Sparrow Records. In interviews regarding that album, he said the death of his father, Clyde "Sonny" McBrayer, on September 13, 2000, inspired the album. "My father's passing brought a moment of revelation. I returned home with so much on my heart and a vision for how to express it. Though Avalon has a common mission statement, these are feelings too personal for a group." One of the tracks, "Never Alone", featured Jadyn Maria. His song "To Ever Live Without Me" received the BMI Christian Music Award for Most Performed Christian Song of the Year in 2004.

In 2007, he announced he would leave Avalon due to a rare form of the heart disease hypertrophic cardiomyopathy. He released what was thought to be his last record as a member of the group, Another Time, Another Place in 2008.

In 2016, showing improvement in the management of his condition, McBrayer and fellow vocalists TaRanda Greene and Doug Anderson formed the group Cana's Voice. They released their first studio album, This Changes Everything, in May of that year. In February, he released a second solo studio effort, Keep Breathing, through StowTown Records. On October of the same year, a solo Christmas record, Christmastime, was released.

In August 2018, McBrayer rejoined Avalon. In addition to his Avalon duties, he continues to perform with Cana's Voice and on solo tour dates.

== Personal life ==
McBrayer is married to Stephanie Harrison and has one daughter, Sarah-Clayton.

In his 2021 memoir So Far, So Good (... But It Was Touch and Go There for a While), McBrayer recounted the sexual abuse committed against him by a Sunday School teacher and his resulting struggle with depression and suicidal ideation as an adult. He also criticized Christian churches for ignoring depression. Additionally, McBrayer pointed out the hypocrisy he has observed in many churches.
