= 28th GMA Dove Awards =

1997 US music awards ceremony

- Date: April 25, 1997
- Location: Nashville Arena, Nashville, Tennessee
- Hosted by: Gary Chapman and CeCe Winans

Television/radio coverage
- Network: The Nashville Network

The 28th Annual GMA Dove Awards were held on April 25, 1997, recognizing accomplishments of musicians for the year 1996. The show was held at the Nashville Arena in Nashville, Tennessee, and was hosted by Gary Chapman and CeCe Winans.

The awards ceremony was nationally televised, with The Nashville Network providing coverage.

== Award recipients ==
=== Artists ===
- Artist of the Year
  - Steven Curtis Chapman
- Male Vocalist of the Year
  - Steven Curtis Chapman
- Female Vocalist of the Year
  - CeCe Winans
- Group of the Year
  - Jars of Clay
- New Artist of the Year
  - Jaci Velasquez
- Songwriter of the Year
  - Steven Curtis Chapman
- Producer of the Year
  - Charlie Peacock

=== Songs ===
- Song of the Year
  - "Butterfly Kisses"; Bob Carlisle, Randy Thomas
- Contemporary Gospel Recorded Song of the Year
  - "Take Me Back"; Tribute - The Songs of Andraé Crouch; CeCe Winans
- Country Recorded Song of the Year
  - "Somebody Was Prayin' for Me"; Steel Witness; Charlie Daniels
- Inspirational Recorded Song of the Year
  - "Butterfly Kisses"; Butterfly Kisses (Shades of Grace); Bob Carlisle
- Modern Rock Recorded Song of the Year
  - "Epidermis Girl"; Space; Bleach
- Pop/Contemporary Recorded Song of the Year
  - "Between You and Me"; Jesus Freak; dc Talk
- Rock Recorded Song of the Year
  - "Like It, Love It, Need It"; Jesus Freak; dc Talk
- Southern Gospel Recorded Song of the Year
  - "Only God Knows"; Wherever You Are; The Martins
- Traditional Gospel Recorded Song of the Year
  - "Stop by the Church"; Heritage of Faith; Babbie Mason
- Urban Recorded Song of the Year
  - "Under the Influence"; Under the Influence; Anointed

=== Albums ===
- Contemporary Gospel Album of the Year
  - Whatcha Lookin' 4; Kirk Franklin & the Family
- Country Album of the Year
  - Little Bit of Faith; Jeff Silvey
- Inspirational Album of the Year
  - My Utmost for His Highest: Quiet Prayers; Bryan Duncan
- Modern Rock Album of the Year
  - Free Flying Soul; The Choir
- Pop/Contemporary Album of the Year
  - Signs of Life; Steven Curtis Chapman
- Praise and Worship Album of the Year
  - Welcome Home; Ron Kenoly
- Rap/Hip Hop Album of the Year
  - Erace; The Gotee Brothers
- Rock Album of the Year
  - Jesus Freak; dc Talk
- Southern Gospel Album of the Year
  - Wherever You Are; The Martins
- Special Event Album of the Year
  - Tribute - The Songs of Andraé Crouch; CeCe Winans, Michael W. Smith, Twila Paris, Bryan Duncan, Wayne Watson, The Winans, Clay Crosse, Take 6, The Brooklyn Tabernacle Choir, First Call, Andraé Crouch and the All-Star Choir
- Traditional Gospel Album of the Year
  - Just a Word; Shirley Caesar's Outreach Convention Choir
- Children's Album of the Year
  - A Very Veggie Christmas; VeggieTales; Phil Vischer, Kurt Heinecke, Mike Nawrocki
- Youth/Children's Musical of the Year
  - Candy Cane Lane; Celeste and David T. Clydesdale
- Choral Collection of the Year
  - My Tribute - Celebrating the Songs of Andraé Crouch; Dale Mathews, John DeVries
- Instrumental Album of the Year
  - The Players; Michael Omartian, Dann Huff, Tommy Sims, Tom Hemby, Terry McMillan, Chris Rodriguez, Shane Keister, Mark Douthit, Eric Darken
- Musical of the Year
  - Make Us One; Babbie Mason, Kenny Mann, David T. Clydesdale
- Recorded Music Packaging of the Year
  - Take Me to Your Leader; Toni Fitzpenn - art direction; George Barris, Michael Wilson, Norman Jean Roy - photographers; Joel Anderson - design; Newsboys

=== Videos ===
- Short Form Music Video of the Year
  - "Jesus Freak"; dc Talk; Steve Strachen; Simon Maxwell
- Long Form Music Video of the Year
  - Roadwork; Geoff Moore & The Distance; Darlene Brock, Gael Van Sant; Tom Bevins
