= Psalm 150 (band) =

Psalm 150 was a seven-piece Jesus music band notable for its horn section, rhythmic style and soulful sound at a time when Christian contemporary music was generally performed with acoustic or soft electric folk/pop songs. The band was initially active between 1971 and 1976 reforming in 2008.

== History ==
The group's name came from the Psalm 150 in the bible which speaks of praising God in all places with various instruments. They recorded two albums in 1974; Make Up Your Mind, for Manna Records and the unreleased Chasin’ the Wind produced by Andraé Crouch.

Greg Eckler of Rubicon, Ricky Nelson, Jon & the Nightriders is accredited with starting the band and seeing it through all the stages of its more than seventy varying musicians. Original bassist Jack Blades went on to perform with Rubicon and Night Ranger. Four members: Jaymes Felix of Tower of Power, Mike Escalante, Glen Myerscough, and Al Gregory later played with Andraé Crouch and the Disciples. Members Sam Scott, Jimmy Erickson and Bob Carlisle went on to form the Allies with Randy Thomas of Sweet Comfort Band. Other members included; Beau MacDougall, Bob Anglin, Bobby Felix, Chris Brock, Steve Ekwall, David Hlebo, Joel Madden, and Artie Dison.

In 2008, Psalm 150, with five original members, Eckler, J. Felix, MacDougall, Myerscough and Gregory, reformed and resumed playing concerts.
