= WOW 1997 =

Compilation album by Various artists
- Released: October 29, 1996
- Genre: Contemporary Christian music
- Label: Sparrow/EMI Christian Music Group
- Producer: Various

Various artists chronology
WOW 1996 (1995)	WOW 1997 (1996)	WOW 1998 (1997)

Professional ratings
Review scores
Source	Rating
AllMusic	4/5 stars

WOW 1997 is a compilation album of 30 Contemporary Christian music hits that was released on October 29, 1996. It charted at No. 1 on Billboard's Top Contemporary Christian chart in 1996, and at No. 2 in 1997. The album reached number 71 in 1996 on the Billboard 200 chart. It was certified as platinum in 1997 by the Recording Industry Association of America (RIAA).

== Track listing ==
=== Disc one ===
1. "Lord of the Dance" – Steven Curtis Chapman
2. "Between You and Me" – dc Talk
3. "All Kinds of People" – Susan Ashton
4. "Love Song for a Savior" – Jars of Clay
5. "Melodies from Heaven [Skate Remix]" – Kirk Franklin & the Family
6. "I'll Lead You Home" – Michael W. Smith
7. "Keep the Candle Burning" – Point of Grace
8. "Love's Been Following You" – Twila Paris
9. "The Message" – 4Him
10. "Every Time" – CeCe Winans
11. "Take Me to Your Leader" – Newsboys
12. "Under the Influence" – Anointed
13. "Man After Your Own Heart" – Gary Chapman
14. "Listen" – Cindy Morgan
15. "God" – Rebecca St. James

=== Disc two ===
1. "Right Place" – Petra
2. "Anything" – PFR
3. "Nothing at All" – Third Day
4. "Walk on Water" – Audio Adrenaline
5. "R.I.O.T." – Carman
6. "More than Gold" – Geoff Moore & the Distance
7. "True Devotion" – Margaret Becker
8. "Time to Believe" – Clay Crosse
9. "Sing Your Praise To The Lord" – Rich Mullins
10. "Mercy Came Running" – Phillips, Craig & Dean
11. "After This Day Is Gone" – Bryan Duncan
12. "After the Rain" – Aaron Jeoffrey
13. "I Know You Know" – Sierra
14. "Through It All" – Wayne Watson
15. "One Drop of Blood" – Ray Boltz

== Certifications ==
Region	Certification	Certified units/sales
United States (RIAA)	Platinum	1,000,000^{^}
^{^} Shipments figures based on certification alone.
