= Raybon Brothers (album) =

Studio album by Raybon Brothers
- Released: August 26, 1997
- Recorded: 1997 at "The Sound Shop"
- Genre: Country
- Length: 33:54
- Label: MCA Nashville
- Producer: Don Cook, Tony Brown

Raybon Brothers is the only studio album by American country music duo Raybon Brothers. The single, "Butterfly Kisses", peaked at number 37 on the Billboard Hot Country Songs chart and number 22 on the Billboard Hot 100. Another single from the album, "The Way She's Looking", reached number 67 on the Hot 100. The third and final single, "Falling" (a duet with Olivia Newton-John), failed to chart in the U.S.

"Tangled Up in Love" was written and released earlier in 1997 by Keith Urban's original band, The Ranch.

== Track listing ==
No.	Title	Writer(s)	Length
1.	"Butterfly Kisses"	Bob Carlisle, Randy Thomas	4:45
2.	"The Way She's Looking"	Don Cook, Billy Lawson	3:08
3.	"Falling" (featuring Olivia Newton-John)	Lenny LeBlanc, Eddie Struzick	3:17
4.	"Gettin' Ready for the World to End"	Bill LaBounty, Randy Goodrum	3:54
5.	"Baby Blue"	Cook, Al Anderson	3:15
6.	"Your Love"	Tim Raybon, Marty Raybon, Mike Curtis	2:39
7.	"Every Fire"	John Scott Sherrill, Cathy Majeski	3:54
8.	"Hello Love"	T. Raybon, Lewis Anderson, Sam Hogin	2:19
9.	"Just Tryin' to Keep The Woman I Got"	Cook, Anderson	3:27
10.	"Tangled Up in Love"	Vernon Rust, Keith Urban	3:16

== Personnel ==
Adapted from liner notes.

Raybon Brothers

- Marty Raybon - vocals (all tracks)
- Tim Raybon - vocals (all tracks)

Additional Musicians

- Al Anderson - acoustic guitar (tracks 4, 5, 9, 10), electric guitar (track 9)
- Bruce C. Bouton - pedal steel guitar (tracks 1, 3–8), lap steel guitar (track 9), Dobro (tracks 2, 10)
- Dennis Burnside - piano (tracks 3, 6)
- Mark Casstevens - acoustic guitar (all tracks)
- Stuart Duncan - fiddle (tracks 3, 6)
- Larry Franklin - fiddle (tracks 2, 5, 7–10), mandolin (track 4)
- David Hungate - bass guitar (tracks 3–7, 9), acoustic bass guitar (tracks 2, 8, 10), six string bass guitar (track 5), Tic tac bass (track 8)
- John Barlow Jarvis - piano (tracks 2, 4, 5, 8, 9), keyboards (tracks 7, 10), B3 organ (track 7)
- Brent Mason - electric guitar (tracks 1, 8), gut string guitar (track 1)
- Steve Nathan - piano (track 1), keyboards (track 1)
- Olivia Newton-John - featured vocals (track 3)
- Brent Rowan - electric guitar (tracks 2–6, 9, 10), electric guitar solo (track 7)
- John Wesley Ryles - background vocals (tracks 2, 4, 8, 10)
- Mike Severs - electric guitar (tracks 2, 4, 5, 7, 8, 10)
- Lonnie Wilson - drums (all tracks), percussion (tracks 7, 10)
- Glenn Worf - bass guitar (track 1)
