= WOW 1996 =

Compilation album by Various artists
- Released: November 7, 1995
- Genre: CCM
- Label: Sparrow
- Producer: Various

Various artists chronology
WOW 1996 (1995)	WOW 1997 (1996)

Professional ratings
Review scores
Source	Rating
AllMusic	4/5 stars

WOW 1996 is a compilation album of thirty contemporary Christian music that was released on November 7, 1995. This represented the first installment in a highly successful annual series named WOW Hits. The album peaked at No. 144 on the Billboard 200 chart in 1995. It also landed in seventh place on Billboard's Top Contemporary Christian album chart that year, and reached second place in 1996. The album was certified as platinum in the year 1997 by the Recording Industry Association of America (RIAA).

== Track listing ==
Disc one

1. "Cry for Love" – Michael W. Smith
2. "Children of the World" – Amy Grant
3. "Heaven in the Real World" – Steven Curtis Chapman
4. "God is In Control" – Twila Paris
5. "Count It All Joy" – BeBe & CeCe Winans
6. "Stand" – Susan Ashton
7. "I Wish We'd All Been Ready" – dc Talk
8. "The Great Divide" – Point of Grace
9. "For Future Generations" – 4Him
10. "Deep Calling Deep" – Margaret Becker
11. "His Love Is Comin' Over Me" – Clay Crosse
12. "When Love Comes To Life" – Out of the Grey
13. "Common Creed" – Wes King
14. "True Believers" – Phil Keaggy
15. "No Doubt" – Petra

Disc two

1. "Build My World Around You" – Sandi Patty
2. "Don't Look Away" – Bryan Duncan
3. "Sweet Days of Grace" – Cindy Morgan
4. "Biggest Part of Me" – Take 6
5. "Go Light Your World" – Kathy Troccoli
6. "Send Out a Prayer" – Anointed
7. "Brother's Keeper" – Rich Mullins
8. "Home Run" – Geoff Moore & the Distance
9. "Great Lengths" – PFR
10. "Shine" – Newsboys
11. "Step of Faith" – Carman
12. "Concert of the Age" – Phillips, Craig & Dean
13. "The Class of '95" – Wayne Watson
14. "The Anchor Holds" – Ray Boltz
15. "Taking My Time" – Ashton, Becker & Denté

== Certifications ==
Region	Certification	Certified units/sales
United States (RIAA)	Platinum	1,000,000^{^}
^{^} Shipments figures based on certification alone.
