= Joyride =

Joyride may refer to:

== Film ==
- Joy Ride (1935 film), a British comedy directed by Harry Hughes
- Joy Ride (1958 film), an American crime film directed by Edward Bernds
- Joyride (1977 film), an American adventure film directed by Joseph Ruben
- Joyride (1997 film), an American film directed by Quinton Peeples
- Joy Ride (2000 film), a Swiss film by Martin Rengel, certified as Dogme movie #14
- Joy Ride (2001 film), an American horror thriller directed by John Dahl
- Joyride (2005 film), a Dutch film directed by Frank Herrebout
- Joy Ride, a 2021 American documentary by Bobcat Goldthwait
- Joyride (2022 film), an Irish coming-of-age film directed by Emer Reynolds
- Joy Ride (2023 film), an American comedy directed by Adele Lim

== Television ==
- Joyride (TV series), a 2004–2005 Philippine drama series
- "Joyride" (Batman Beyond), a 1999 episode
- "Joyride" (The Outer Limits), a 1999 episode
- "Joy Ride" (Steven Universe), a 2015 episode
- "Joy Ride" (The Twilight Zone), a 1987 episode
- "The Joy Ride", a 1975 episode of Upstairs, Downstairs

== Literature ==
- Joyride, a 1994 novel by Jack Ketchum
- Joyride, a 2016 novel by Guy Adams based on the TV series Class
- "Joy Ride", a short story by Richard Russo from his 2002 collection The Whore's Child and Other Stories

== Music ==
=== Performers ===
- Joyryde, John Ford (born 1985), English DJ and producer
- Joyride, a member of Australian electronic music duo the Meeting Tree

=== Albums ===
- Joy Ride (album), by the Dramatics, 1976
- Joyride (Astrid S album)
- Joyride (Boom Boom Satellites album) or the title song, 1997
- Joyride (Bryan Duncan album), 2001
- Joyride (The Four Lovers album) or the title song, 1956
- Joyride (Friendsound album), 1969
- Joyride (Lida Husik album) or the title song, 1995
- Joyride (Oleander album) or the title song, 2003
- Joyride (Pieces of a Dream album) or the title song, 1986
- Joyride (Roxette album) or the title song (see below), 1991
- Joyride (Stanley Turrentine album), 1965
- Joyride (Tinashe album) or the title song, 2018
- Joyride (Transit album), 2014
- Joyride: Remixes, by Mirah, 2006

=== Songs ===
- "Joyride" (Roxette song), 1991
- "Joyride", the theme for the original Grand Theft Auto (and sometimes known by that name) by Craig Conner and Jonathan Willson as the fictional band "Da Shootaz", 1997
- "Joyride (Omen)", by Chevelle, 2016
- "Joyride" (Kesha song), 2024
- "Joyride", by Bassjackers and Brooks, 2017
- "Joyride", by Home Made Kazoku, 2005
- "Joyride", by Jump5 from All the Time in the World, 2002
- "Joyride", by Oliver Tree from Love You Madly Hate You Badly, 2026
- "Joy Ride", by the Killers from Day & Age, 2008
- "Joy Ride", by Mariah Carey from The Emancipation of Mimi, 2005
- "Joy Ride", by TLC from TLC, 2017

=== Musicals ===
- Joyride the Musical, jukebox musical based on Roxette's music, 2024

== Other uses ==
- Joyride (crime), involving stealing vehicles
- Kinect Joy Ride, a 2010 racing game for the Xbox 360
- Red Bull Joyride, a slopestyle mountain biking competition
- JoyRide (company), a Philippine company
- Joyride Sweets, a candy company associated with Ryan Trahan

== See also ==
- Joyrider (disambiguation)
- Rough ride (police brutality)
