= Butterfly Kisses (Shades of Grace) =

Studio album by Bob Carlisle
- Released: May 13, 1997
- Studio: High-Pass Productions (Franklin, Tennessee): Gambit Studio (Gallatin, Tennessee)
- Genre: CCM
- Length: 45:41
- Label: Diadem/Jive
- Producer: Bob Carlisle

Bob Carlisle chronology
The Hope of a Man (1994)	Butterfly Kisses (Shades of Grace) (1997)	Stories from the Heart (1998)

Professional ratings
Review scores
Source	Rating
AllMusic	4.5/5 stars

Butterfly Kisses (Shades of Grace) is the third studio album by American Christian music artist Bob Carlisle. It was released by Diadem/Jive Records on May 13, 1997. The album peaked at No. 1 on the Billboard 200.

== Track listing ==
No.	Title	Writer(s)	Length
1.	"Butterfly Kisses"	Bob Carlisle, Randy Thomas	5:38
2.	"You Must Have Been an Angel"	Carlisle, Rick Elias	4:14
3.	"Man of His Word"	Carlisle, Mike Demus, Dennis Patton	4:56
4.	"On My Way to Paradise"	Carlisle, Thomas	4:15
5.	"One Man Revival"	Carlisle, Thomas	4:13
6.	"Mighty Love"	Carlisle, Regie Hamm	4:35
7.	"Living Water"	Carlisle, Thomas	4:26
8.	"It Is Well with My Soul"	Carlisle	4:17
9.	"On My Knees"	Carlisle, Elias, Hamm	4:09
10.	"I'm Gonna Be Ready"	Carlisle, Thomas	4:58
11.	"Butterfly Kisses" (country remix)	Carlisle, Thomas	5:39

== Personnel ==
- Bob Carlisle – vocals, backing vocals, guitars, mandolin
- Regie Hamm – keyboards, acoustic piano, organ, drums, percussion, arrangements
- Dennis Patton – keyboards, acoustic piano, organ, arrangements
- Scott Sheriff – keyboards, acoustic piano, organ, arrangements
- Glenn Pearce – guitars, electric sitar
- Mark Hill – bass
- Linda Elias – backing vocals
- Lesley Glassford – backing vocals
- Rebecca Palmer – backing vocals
- Bryan Duncan – vocals (10)

=== Production ===
- Larry Day – executive producer
- Bob Carlisle – producer
- David Jahnsen – recording, mixing
- Don Cobb – editing
- Denny Purcell – mastering at Georgetown Masters (Nashville, Tennessee)
- Jackie Murphy – art direction (front cover)
- Nick Gamma – design (front cover)
- Scott Harris – art direction, design
- Tamara Reynolds – photography
- Ray Ware – management

== Charts ==
=== Weekly charts ===
Chart (1997)	Peak position
Australian Albums (ARIA)	10
Canadian Albums (RPM)	6
Canadian Country Albums (RPM)	1
US Billboard 200	1
US Top Christian Albums (Billboard)	1
US Heatseekers Albums (Billboard)	1

=== Year-end charts ===
Chart (1997)	Position
US Billboard 200	32

== Certifications/sales ==
Region	Certification	Certified units/sales
Australia (ARIA)	Gold	35,000^{^}
United States (RIAA)	2× Platinum	2,000,000^{^}
^{^} Shipments figures based on certification alone.
