= Slow Revival =

Studio album by Bryan Duncan
- Released: 1994
- Studios: Tejas Recorders (Franklin, Tennessee); OmniSound Studios, 3319 Studio and Quad Studios (Nashville, Tennessee); Bunny Hop Studios (Sherman Oaks, California); Shelter Studio (Riverside, California); Hollywood Sound Recorders (Hollywood, California); Embassy Studios and Pack's Place (Los Angeles, California)
- Genres: Gospel, CCM
- Length: 46:52
- Label: Myrrh
- Producers: Dan Posthuma; Michael Omartian (rhythm track co-producer)

Bryan Duncan chronology
Mercy (1992)	Slow Revival (1994)	Quiet Prayers (1996)

Slow Revival is the seventh album by contemporary Christian artist Bryan Duncan. Released on Myrrh Records in 1994, the album was nominated in the Best Contemporary Album category at the 26th GMA Dove Awards.

== Background and release ==
Duncan said of the album's message: "(People) have to understand that even though they might not be where they would like to be in their spirituality, they should not be discouraged or give up." According to Duncan, the theme was something he was personally dealing with at the time of the album's recording, and that he found peace during the process. Slow Revival, released in 1994, peaked at number five on the Billboard Top Contemporary Christian chart. Three singles from the album - "Traces of Heaven", "Things Are Gonna Change", and "United We Stand" - reached number one on the Christian radio charts. In a review of the album, Mike Joyce of The Washington Post wrote that Duncan's singing "is far more colorful on the funk tracks, particularly 'Wheels of a Good Thing,' but even here his evangelical fervor is tempered by his sharp pop instincts." Slow Revival was nominated in the Best Contemporary Album category at the 26th GMA Dove Awards.

== Promotion ==
To support the album, Duncan embarked on the Slow Revival Tour with opening acts Rebecca St. James and Bob Carlisle. Concerts featured Duncan joining each artist on stage for a couple of songs during their respective sets. The three singers performed together for each show's finale. In a review of the tour stop in Nashville, Deborah Evans Price of Billboard called it "a high-octane concert performance with a dash of late-night talk show zaniness." She noted that a NHK news crew filmed a segment of the show for a piece to air in Japan on the growing popularity at the time of contemporary Christian music.

== Track listing ==
No.	Title	Writer(s)	Length
1.	"A Heavenly Light"	Bryan Duncan, Randy Lee, LouAnn Lee	4:28
2.	"United We Stand"	Duncan, James Felix	4:13
3.	"Don't Look Away"	Duncan, Chuck Barth	4:32
4.	"Your Love, My Saving Grace"	Duncan, Reed Vertelney	5:17
5.	"Traces of Heaven"	Duncan, Michael Omartian	4:53
6.	"My House"	Duncan, Omartian	4:17
7.	"Lonely Tonight"	Duncan, Barth	4:33
8.	"Things Are Gonna Change"	Duncan, Vertelney	5:43
9.	"Wheels of a Good Thing"	Duncan, Omartian, Darrell Brown	3:35
10.	"Safe Harbor"	David Lasley, Lana Marrano, Dan Posthuma, Brown	5:08

== Personnel ==
Musicians

- Bryan Duncan – lead vocals
- Michael Omartian – keyboards and track arrangements (1, 2, 5, 6, 9)
- Robbie Buchanan – keyboards and track arrangements (3, 10)
- Peter Wolf – keyboards and track arrangements (4, 7, 8)
- Randy Lee – additional keyboards
- Alan Pasqua – Hammond B3 organ, additional keyboards
- Dann Huff – guitars
- Gary Chapman – guitars
- Cedric Lee – bass
- John Peano – bass
- Neil Stubenhaus – bass
- Curt Bisquera – drums and percussion
- Eric Darken – drums and percussion
- Steve Latination – drums and percussion
- John Robinson – drums and percussion
- Carlos Vega – drums and percussion
- David Lhebo – saxophones
- Dennis Good – trombone
- John Darnall – string arrangements
- The Nashville String Machine – strings
- Ann Bailey – backing vocals
- Darrell Brown – backing vocals
- Tony Gillis – backing vocals
- Shaun Murphy – backing vocals
- David Pack – backing vocals
- Carol Perry – backing vocals
- Lori Perry – backing vocals
- Sharon Perry – backing vocals
- Dan Posthuma – backing vocals
- Anointed (Steve Crawford, Da'dra Crawford, Mary Tiller and Nee-C Walls) – guest vocals on "United We Stand"

Production

- Ray Ware – executive producer
- Dan Posthuma – producer
- Michael Omartian – rhythm track co-producer (5, 6, 9)
- Mike Mierau – engineer
- Doug Bieden – additional engineer
- Terry Christian – additional engineer
- Bryan Davis – additional engineer
- Paul Ericksen – additional engineer
- Dan Garcia – additional engineer
- S. Husky Hoskulds – additional engineer
- Dennis "DJ" Johnson – additional engineer
- Ross Pallone – additional engineer
- Doug Sarrett – additional engineer
- Bert Stevens – additional engineer
- Aaron Swihart – additional engineer
- Anthony Thomas – additional engineer
- Eric "Smpte" Slaughter – technical credit
- Bill Schnee – mixing at Schnee Studio (North Hollywood, California)
- Bob Ludwig – mastering at Gateway Mastering (Portland, Maine)
- Diana Barnes – art direction
- Franke Design Company – design
- F. Scott Schafer – photography

== Charts ==
Chart (1994)	Peak position
U.S. Billboard Top Contemporary Christian	5
