= 26th GMA Dove Awards =

1995 US music awards ceremony

- Date: April 27, 1995
- Location: Grand Ole Opry House, Nashville, Tennessee
- Hosted by: Gary Chapman, Steven Curtis Chapman, Twila Paris, and CeCe Winans

The 26th Annual GMA Dove Awards were held on April 27, 1995, to recognizing accomplishments of musicians for the year 1994. The show was held at the Grand Ole Opry House in Nashville, Tennessee, and was hosted by Gary Chapman, Steven Curtis Chapman, Twila Paris and CeCe Winans.

== Award recipients ==
=== Artists ===
- Artist of the Year
  - Steven Curtis Chapman
- New Artist of the Year
  - Clay Crosse
- Group of the Year
  - 4Him
- Male Vocalist of the Year
  - Steven Curtis Chapman
- Female Vocalist of the Year
  - Twila Paris
- Songwriter of the Year
  - Steven Curtis Chapman
- Producer of the Year
  - Charlie Peacock

=== Songs ===
- Song of the Year
  - “God Is In Control”; Twila Paris
- Rap/Hip Hop Recorded Song of the Year
  - "Luv Is a Verb"; Free at Last; dc Talk
- Rock Recorded Song of the Year
  - "Shine"; Going Public; Newsboys
- Pop/Contemporary Recorded Song of the Year
  - “Heaven in the Real World”; Heaven in the Real World; Steven Curtis Chapman
- Hard Music Recorded Song of the Year
  - “Come Unto the Light”; Unveiled; Whitecross
- Southern Gospel Recorded Song of the Year
  - "I Bowed On My Knees"; The Gaither Vocal Band
- Inspirational Recorded Song of the Year
  - "I Pledge Allegiance to the Lamb"; Allegiance; Ray Boltz
- Country Recorded Song of the Year
  - "Love Will"; Michael James
- Traditional Gospel Recorded Song of the Year
  - "He's Working It Out for You"; Shirley Caesar
- Contemporary Gospel Recorded Song of the Year
  - "God Knows"; Angelo & Veronica

=== Albums ===
- Rock Album of the Year
  - Going Public; Newsboys
- Pop/Contemporary Album of the Year
  - Heaven in the Real World; Steven Curtis Chapman
- Hard Music Album of the Year
  - Scarecrow Messiah; Bride
- Inspirational Album of the Year
  - Find It on the Wings; Sandi Patty
- Contemporary Gospel Album of the Year
  - Join the Band; Take 6
- Traditional Gospel Album of the Year
  - Live at GMWA; Shirley Caesar, O'Landa Draper & The Associates, Rev. Milton Brunson & The Thompson Community Singers
- Country Album of the Year
  - The Door; Charlie Daniels
- Southern Gospel Album of the Year
  - High and Lifted Up; The Cathedrals
- Instrumental Album of the Year
  - Strike Up The Band; Ralph Carmichael Big Band
- Praise & Worship Album of the Year
  - Coram Deo II; Out of the Grey, Steve Green, Margaret Becker, Charlie Peacock, Steven Curtis Chapman, CeCe Winans, and Bob Carlisle
- Children's Music Album of the Year
  - Yo! Kidz! 2: The Armor of God; Carman
- Musical Album
  - Living on the Edge; Michael W. Smith
- Choral Collection Album
  - A Christmas Suite; David T. Clydesdale
- Recorded Music Packaging of the Year
  - Heaven in the Real World; Karen Philpott, Gerhart Yurkovic, E.J. Carr, R.J. Lyons

=== Videos ===
- Long Form Music Video of the Year
  - Mouth in Motion; Mark Lowry
- Short Form Music Video of the Year
  - "I Will Be Free"; Cindy Morgan
