= Real as I Wanna Be =

1998 studio album by Cliff Richard

Studio album by Cliff Richard
- Released: 19 October 1998
- Recorded: 1997–1998
- Studio: Little America Recording Studios; Ocean Studios; Arco Studios; RG Jones; The Pierce Room
- Genre: Pop; blue-eyed soul; easy listening
- Label: EMI (UK / Europe); Finer Arts Records (US)
- Producer: Peter Wolf

Cliff Richard chronology
Heathcliff Live (1996)	Real as I Wanna Be (1998)	The Whole Story: His Greatest Hits (2000)

Singles from Real as I Wanna Be
- 1. "Can't Keep this Feeling In" Released: 12 October 1998; 2. "The Miracle" Released: 26 July 1999

Professional ratings
Review scores
Source	Rating
AllMusic	4.5/5 stars

Real as I Wanna Be is an album by Cliff Richard, released in October 1998 by EMI Records. It peaked at number 10 on the UK Albums Chart and was certified Silver in the UK and Gold in New Zealand.

== overview ==
"Can't Keep this Feeling In" was released as the lead single a week ahead of the album and peaked on debut at number 10 on the UK Singles Chart. "The Miracle" was released in July the following year and peaked at number 23.

"Vita Mia", a duet with Vincenzo La Scola was intended to be the second single over the 1998 Christmas period. A video clip was recorded for it and artwork for a CD single was produced together with a promo CD single for radio. However, the record company EMI postponed its release until January, citing Richard's ill health as the reason (the ill health being a chest infection followed by laryngitis, which also prevented him from singing during rehearsals for concerts in November 1998). Relations between Richard and EMI at the time were also strained due to the lack of promotion and lack of sales of the album, and the single was further postponed until February before being abandoned altogether.

"Butterfly Kisses" had also been slated to be the third single from the album, and a video clip was recorded for it, but neither materialised.

== Track listing ==
1. "Real as I Wanna Be" (Peter Zizzo) – 4:32
2. "Even If It Breaks My Heart" (Adam Gorgoni, Phil Roy, Shelly Peiken) – 3:45
3. "Can't Keep this Feeling In" (Arnie Roman, Dennis Lambert, Steve Skinner) – 3:49
4. "Climbing Up Mount Everest" (Robin Lerner, Tommy Lee James) – 3:01
5. "United for Evermore" (Dennis Morgan, John McLaughlin, Steve DuBerry) – 4:21
6. "She Makes Me Feel Like a Man" (Cliff Richard, Michelle Wolf, Peter Wolf) – 5:38
7. "Butterfly Kisses" (Bob Carlisle, Randy Thomas) – 5:14
8. "Snowfall on the Sahara" (Ina Wolf, Natalie Cole, Peter Wolf) – 4:26
9. "Woman and a Man" (Noel McKoy, Michelle Wolf, Shelly Peiken) – 4:47
10. "Till I'm Home Again" (Amy Sky, Andy Hill) – 5:15
11. "Come Back to Me" (Michelle Wolf, Peter Wolf) – 4:47
12. "The Miracle" (Brenda Lee Eugar) – 3:28
13. "Vita Mia" (duet with Vincenzo La Scola, tenor) (Lyrics by Michelle Wolf, Zucchero Fornaciari; music by Peter Wolf) – 4:18

US edition bonus track

14. "Had to Be" (featuring Olivia Newton-John) (John Farrar, Tim Rice)

== Personnel ==
=== Musicians ===
Adapted from AllMusic.

- Vinnie Colaiuta – drums
- John Cushon – drums
- Lynn Davis – background vocals
- Kevin Dorsey – background vocals
- Siedah Garrett – background vocals
- Everette Harp – alto sax
- James Ingram – background vocals
- Matthias Jabs – guitar
- Paul Jackson Jr. – guitar, sitar
- Ricky Lawson – drums
- Anastasios Panos – drums
- Cliff Richard – primary artist, background vocals
- Jeff Richman – guitar
- Michelle Wolf – background vocals

=== Production ===
- Marketing / Distribution / Manufacturing EMI
- Phonographic copyright – EMI Records Ltd. / Copyright – EMI Records Ltd.
- Recorded at Little America Recording Studios / Ocean Studios / Arco Studios / R.G. Jones Studios / The Pierce Room
- Mixed at Little America Recording Studios
- Mastered at Precision Mastering
- Design – The Attik
- Engineers – Chris Heil, Christian Leitgeb, Keith Bessey, Paul Ericksen
- Mastered by Stephen Marcussen
- Mixed by Julian Mendelsohn (tracks 10–12), Peter Wolf
- Produced and arranged by Peter Wolf

== Charts and certifications ==
=== Charts ===
Chart (1998)	Peak position
Australian Albums (ARIA)	91
Dutch Albums (Album Top 100)	100
New Zealand Albums (RMNZ)	27
Scottish Albums (OCC)	29
UK Albums (OCC)	10

=== Certifications ===
Region	Certification	Certified units/sales
New Zealand (RMNZ)	Gold	7,500^{^}
United Kingdom (BPI)	Silver	60,000^{*}
^{*} Sales figures based on certification alone.^{^} Shipments figures based on certification alone.
