= 29th GMA Dove Awards =

1998 US music awards ceremony

- Date: April 23, 1998
- Location: Nashville Arena, Nashville, Tennessee
- Hosted by: John Tesh; Naomi Judd

Television/radio coverage
- Network: The Nashville Network

The 29th Annual GMA Dove Awards were held on April 23, 1998, recognizing accomplishments of musicians for the year 1997. The show was held in Nashville, Tennessee, at the Nashville Arena. Live coverage on The Nashville Network was hosted by John Tesh and Naomi Judd, with a one-hour pre-show hosted by Clarence Gilyard and Kathy Troccoli. This would be the last full national telecast of the event until 2003 (the hosting network would evolve into fare which the award show likely would not have fit within).

== Results ==
Song of the Year

"On My Knees"; David Mullen, Nicole Coleman-Mullen, Michael Ochs (Seat of the Pants Music/Word Music (ASCAP), Ochsongs Music (BMI))

Songwriter of the Year

Steven Curtis Chapman

Male Vocalist of the Year

Steven Curtis Chapman

Female Vocalist of the Year

Crystal Lewis

Group of the Year

Jars of Clay

Artist of the Year

Rich Mullins

New Artist of the Year

Avalon

Producer of the Year

Brown Bannister

Southern Gospel Album of the Year

Light of the World; The Martins; Michael Sykes, Lari Gross; Spring Hill

Southern Gospel Recorded Song of the Year

"Butterfly Kisses"; The Rock Cries Out; Tim Greene, Bob Carlisle, Randy Thomas; New Haven

Inspirational Album of the Year

Artist of My Soul; Sandi Patty; Robbie Buchanan; Word

Inspirational Recorded Song of the Year

"A Baby's Prayer"; Love and Mercy; Kathy Troccoli; Kathy Troccoli, Scott Brasher; Reunion

Pop/Contemporary Album of the Year

Behind the Eyes; Amy Grant; Keith Thomas, Wayne Kirkpatrick; Myrrh

Pop/Contemporary Recorded Song of the Year

"Let Us Pray"; Signs of Life; Steven Curtis Chapman; Steven Curtis Chapman; Sparrow

Contemporary Gospel Album of the Year (formerly Contemporary Black Gospel)

Pray; Andrae Crouch; Andrae Crouch, Scott V. Smith; Qwest/Warner Bros.

Contemporary Gospel Recorded Song of the Year (formerly Contemporary Black Gospel)

"Up Where I Belong"; BeBe & CeCe Winans – Greatest Hits; BeBe & CeCe Winans; Will Jennings, Jack Nitschi, Buffy Sainte Marie; Sparrow

Traditional Gospel Album of the Year (formerly Traditional Black Gospel)

A Miracle in Harlem; Shirley Caesar; Bubba Smith, Shirley Caesar, Michael Mathis; Word Gospel

Traditional Gospel Recorded Song of the Year (formerly Traditional Black Gospel)

"I Go to the Rock"; The Preacher's Wife Soundtrack; Whitney Houston; Dottie Rambo; Arista

Urban Recorded Song of the Year

"Stomp"; God's Property; Kirk Franklin, George Clinton, Jr., Garry Shider, Walter Morrison; B'Rite Music

Country Album of the Year

Hymns from the Ryman; Gary Chapman; Gary Chapman; Word Nashville

Country Recorded Song of the Year

"The Gift"; The Best of Collin Raye – Direct Hits; Collin Raye, Jim Brickman; Tom Douglas, Jim Brickman; Word Nashville

Rock Album of the Year

Conspiracy No. 5; Third Day; Sam Taylor; Reunion

Rock Recorded Song of the Year

"Alien"; Conspiracy No. 5; Third Day; Mac Powell; Mark Lee, Tai Anderson, Brad Avery, David Carr; Reunion

Hard Music Album of the Year

Insufficient number of eligible entries

Hard Music Recorded Song of the Year

Insufficient number of eligible entries

Rap/Hip Hop Album

Revived; World Wide Message Tribe; Zarc Porter; Warner Alliance

Rap/Hip Hop Recorded Song

"Jumping in the House of God"; Revived; World Wide Message Tribe; Andy Hawthorne, Zarc Porter, Lee Jackson, Justin Thomas; Warner Alliance

Modern Rock Album of the Year

Caedmon's Call; Caedmon's Call; Don McCollister; Warner Alliance

Modern Rock Recorded Song of the Year

"Some Kind of Zombie"; Some Kind of Zombie; The Single; Audio Adrenaline; Mark Stuart; Barry Blair, Will McGinniss, Bob Herdman; Forefront

Instrumental Album of the Year

Invention; Phil Keaggy, Wes King, Scott Dente'; R.S. Field; Sparrow

Praise and Worship Album of the Year

Petra Praise 2; We Need Jesus; Petra; John & Dino Elefante; Word

Children's Music Album of the Year

Sing Me to Sleep Daddy; Billy Gaines, Michael James, Phil Keaggy, Michael O'Brien, Guy Penrod, Peter Penrose, Angelo Petrucci, Michael W. Smith, Randy Stonehill, Wayne Watson; Nathan DiGesare; Brentwood Kids Co.

Musical of the Year

My Utmost for His Highest – A Worship Musical; Gary Rhodes, Claire Cloninger; Word Music

Youth/Children's Musical of the Year

Insufficient number of eligible entries

Choral Collection of the Year

Our Savior Emmanuel; Greg Nelson, Bob Farrell; Word Music: Elijah Chester

Special Event Album of the Year

God with Us – A Celebration of Christmas Carols & Classics; Anointed, Michael W. Smith, Twila Paris, Sandi Patty, Steven Curtis Chapman, Chris Willis, Steve Green, Cheri Keaggy, Avalon, Out of the Grey, Ray Boltz, Clay Crosse, CeCe Winans, Larnelle Harris;

Short Form Music Video of the Year

"Colored People"; dc Talk; Mars Media; Lawrence Carroll; Forefront/Virgin

Long Form Music Video of the Year

A Very Silly Sing Along; Veggie Tales; Mike Nawrocki, Chris Olsen, Kurt Heinecke; Everland Entertainment

Recorded Music Packaging of the Year

Beth Lee; Gina R. Brinkley, Janice Booker; Ben Pearson, D.L. Taylor; Sixpence None the Richer; Sixpence None the Richer; Squint Entertainment

Bluegrass Recorded Song of the Year

"Children of the Living God"; This Bright Hour; Fernando Ortega, Alison Krauss; Fernando Ortega; Myrrh

Spanish Language Album of the Year

La Belleze de la Cruz; Crystal Lewis; Brian Ray, Dan Posthuma; Word International

Enhanced CD of the Year

Live the Life; Michael W. Smith; Craig A. Mason; Reunion

Urban Album of the Year

God's Property from Kirk Franklin's Nu Nation; God's Property; Kirk Franklin; B'Rite Music

Bluegrass Album of the Year

Bridges; The Isaacs; Ben Isaacs; Horizon

== Album ==
Here is a list of the songs from the 1998 Dove Awards that were released on "The 1998 Dove Award Nominees" compact disk:

#	Title	Artist
1	"Live the Life"	Michael W. Smith
2	"Let Us Pray"	Steven Curtis Chapman
3	"Living Water"	Bob Carlisle
4	"Elijah"	Rich Mullins
5	"Deep Enough to Dream"	Chris Rice
6	"Hope to Carry On"	Caedmon's Call
7	"People Get Ready . . . Jesus is Comin'"	Crystal Lewis
8	"Give It Up"	Avalon
9	"He Walked a Mile"	Clay Crosse
10	"A Baby's Prayer"	Kathy Troccoli
