= List of Billboard Adult Contemporary number ones of 1997 =

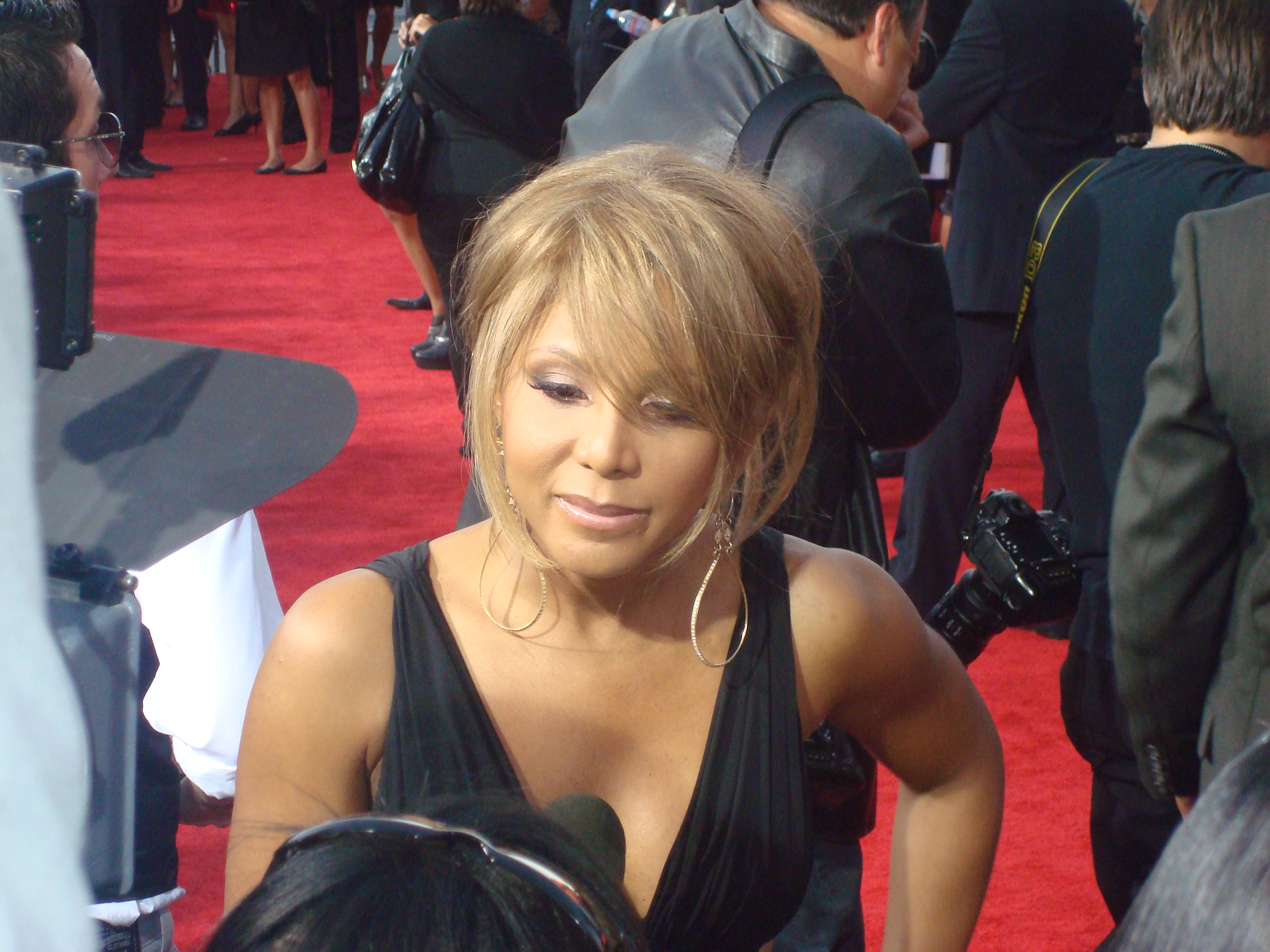
Toni Braxton (pictured in 2009) spent the first 14 weeks of the year at number one with "Un-Break My Heart".

Adult Contemporary is a chart published by Billboard magazine ranking the top-performing songs in the United States in the adult contemporary music (AC) market. In 1997, 10 different songs topped the chart in 52 issues of the magazine, based on weekly airplay data from radio stations compiled by Nielsen Broadcast Data Systems.

In the year's first issue of Billboard, "Un-Break My Heart" by Toni Braxton moved up to number one, displacing the final chart-topper of 1996, "When You Love a Woman" by the band Journey. Braxton's song held the top spot for 14 consecutive weeks, the year's longest unbroken run at number one, before being displaced by Celine Dion's recording of the 1975 song "All by Myself". In May, Bob Carlisle, an artist most associated with the contemporary Christian music scene, achieved an unexpected crossover hit and spent seven weeks at number one on the AC chart with "Butterfly Kisses", his first song to appear on the listing. Despite being very successful on both AC and pop music radio, the song did not appear on Billboard's pop chart, the Hot 100, because its only physical release was as a limited edition sold only in Christian bookstores, making it ineligible for the listing under the rules in place at the time.

Beginning in September, LeAnn Rimes spent 11 weeks at number one with "How Do I Live", the second-longest run at number one in 1997. The song had been written for the soundtrack of the film Con Air, but after Rimes had recorded her version of the song, film company executives changed their minds and asked Trisha Yearwood to record it for the soundtrack instead. Rimes and her record label decided to release her version as a single anyway, with the result that both versions of the song went on sale at the same time in May 1997. While Yearwood's recording achieved some success, it was eclipsed by the version recorded by Rimes, which went on to sell more than 3 million copies. The year's final Adult Contemporary chart-topper was "Something About the Way You Look Tonight" by Elton John, which reached number one in the issue of Billboard dated November 22 and held the top spot for the remainder of the year. The song was released as a double A-sided single with "Candle in the Wind 1997", the singer's tribute to his close friend Diana, Princess of Wales, who had died in August of the same year. Because the Adult Contemporary chart is based on airplay of individual songs, the two tracks charted separately and "Something About the Way You Look Tonight" went all the way to number one while "Candle in the Wind 1997" peaked at number five. The double-sided release went on to become one of the biggest-selling singles of all time, with recorded sales of over 30 million copies.

== Chart history ==
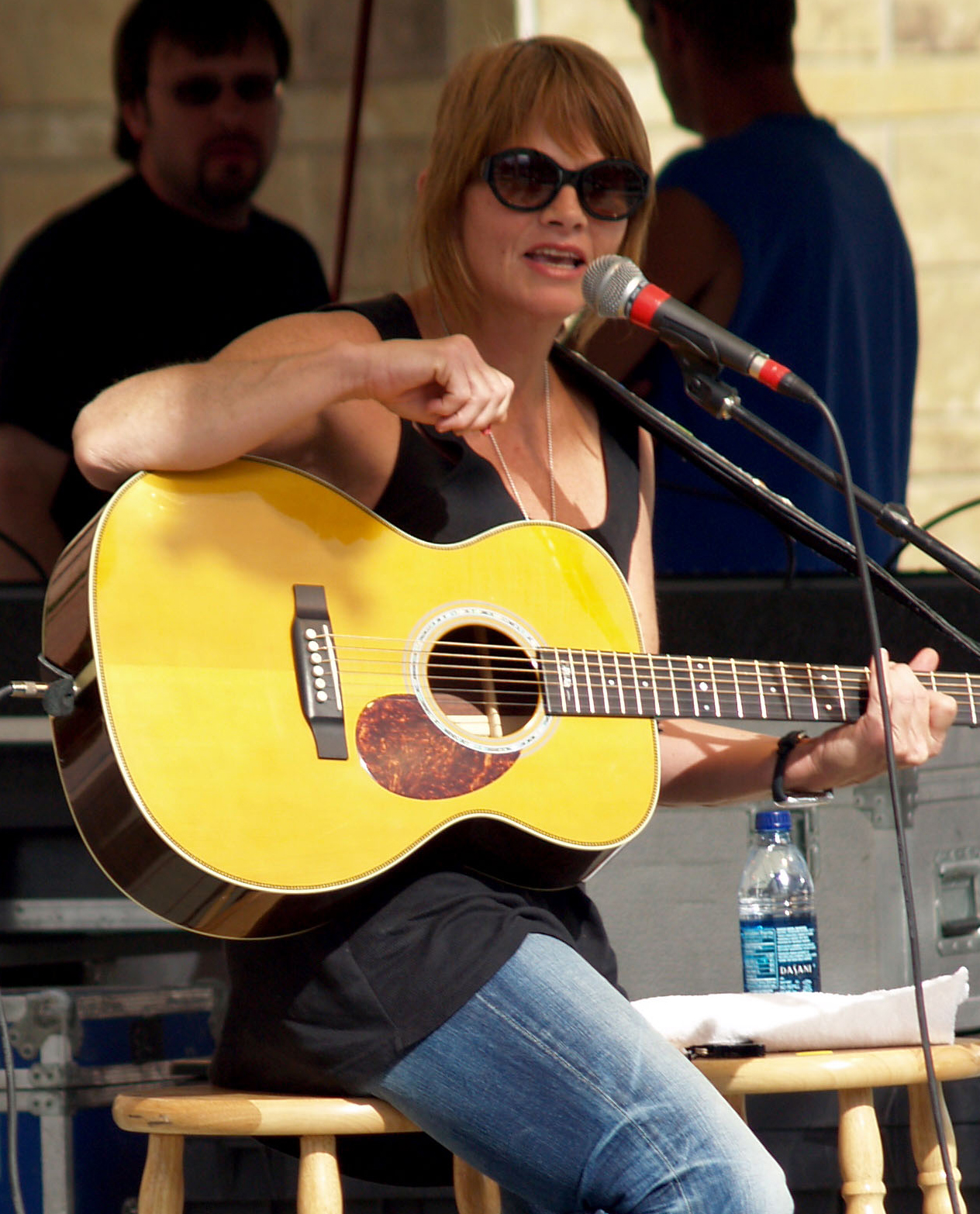
"Sunny Came Home" was a chart-topper for Shawn Colvin (pictured in 2008).

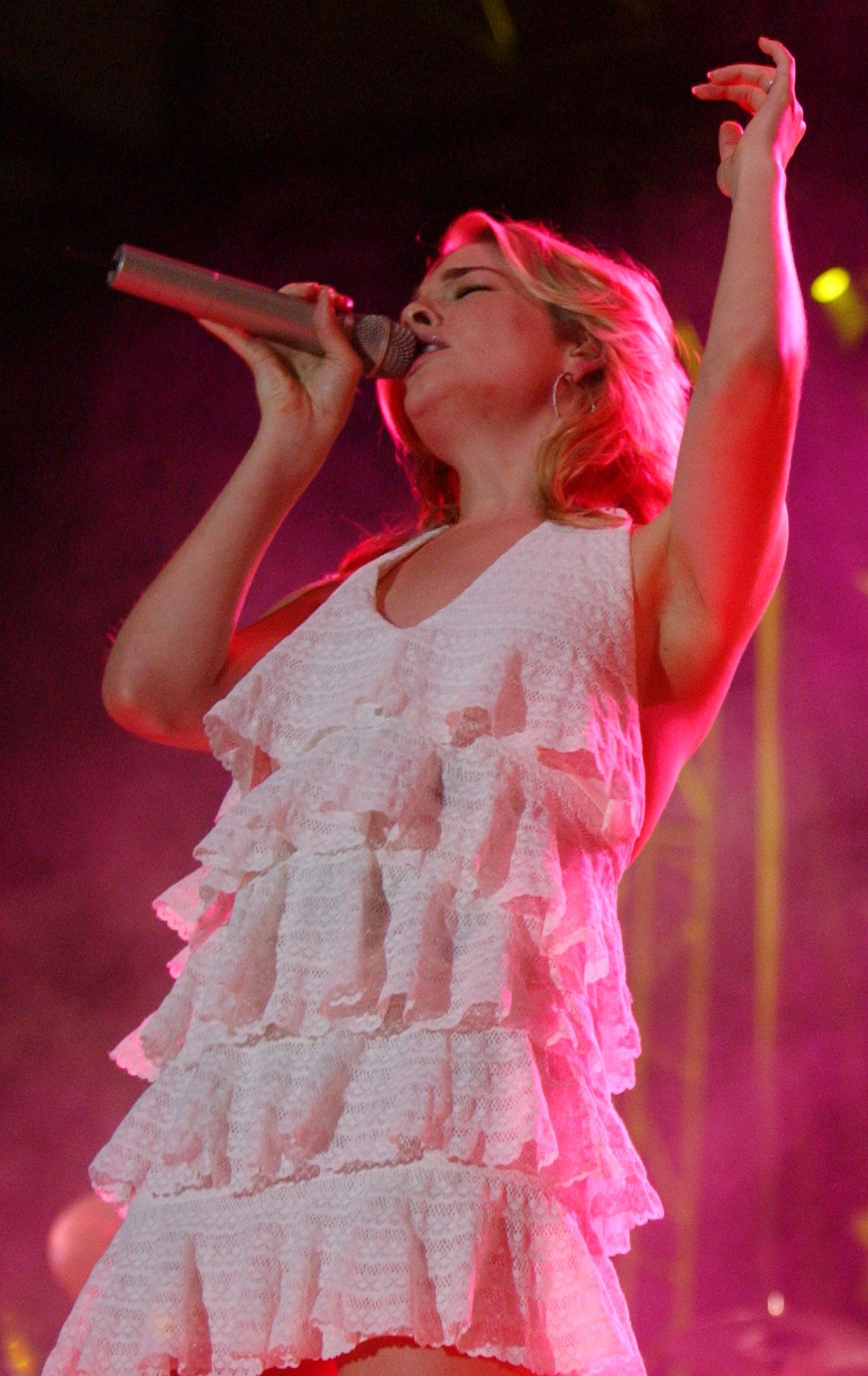
"How Do I Live" by LeAnn Rimes (pictured in 2004) spent eleven consecutive weeks at number one.

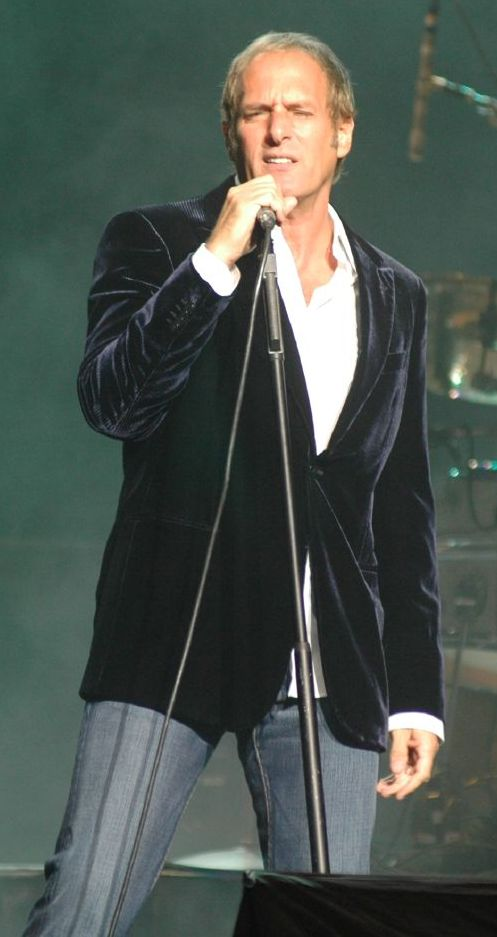
"Go the Distance" by Michael Bolton (pictured in 2006) spent a total of three weeks at number one on the chart.

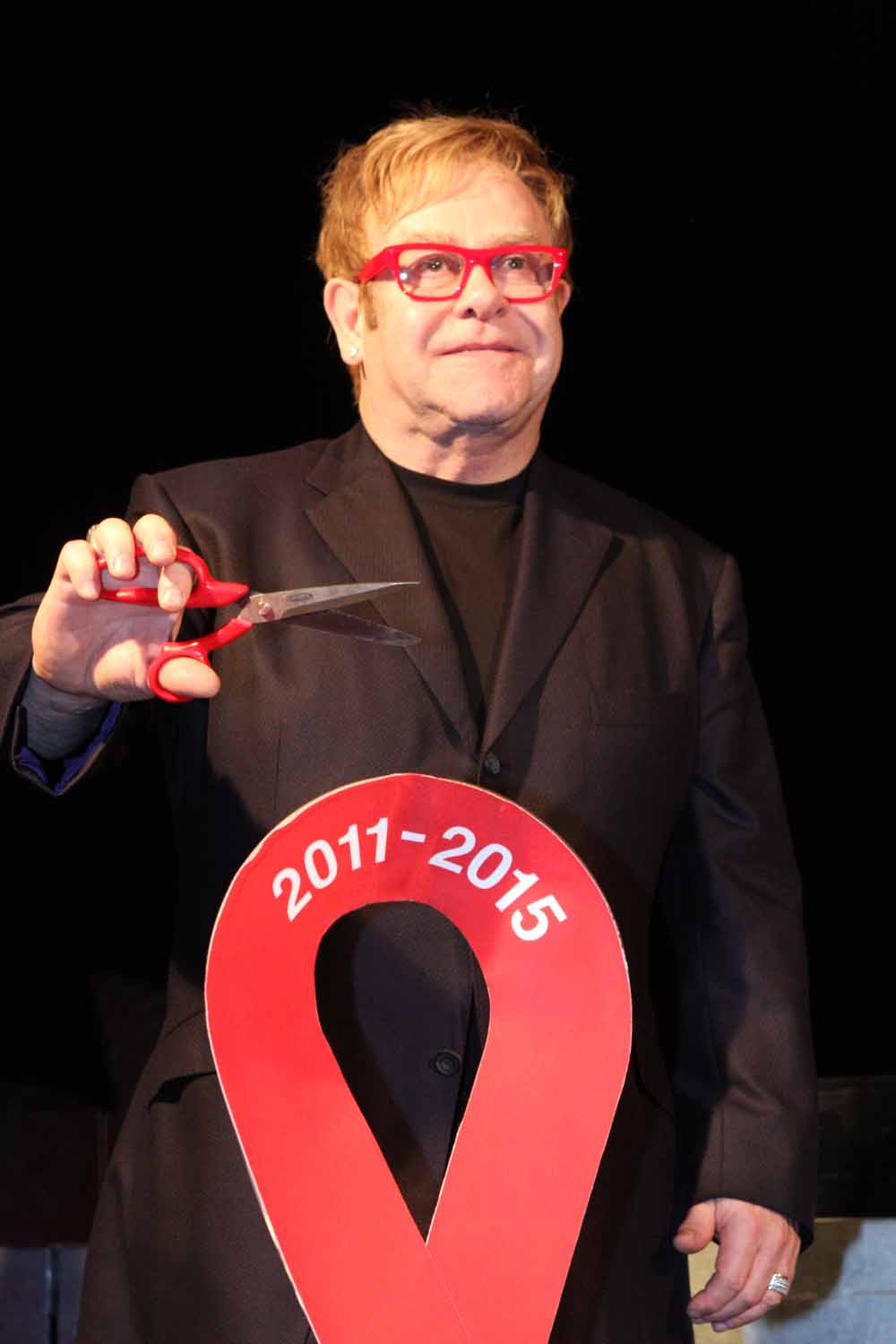
Elton John (pictured in 2011) ended the year atop the chart with "Something About the Way You Look Tonight".

Chart history
Issue date	Title	Artist(s)	Ref.
January 4	"Un-Break My Heart"	Toni Braxton	
January 11	"Un-Break My Heart"	Toni Braxton	
January 18	"Un-Break My Heart"	Toni Braxton	
January 25	"Un-Break My Heart"	Toni Braxton	
February 1	"Un-Break My Heart"	Toni Braxton	
February 8	"Un-Break My Heart"	Toni Braxton	
February 15	"Un-Break My Heart"	Toni Braxton	
February 22	"Un-Break My Heart"	Toni Braxton	
March 1	"Un-Break My Heart"	Toni Braxton	
March 8	"Un-Break My Heart"	Toni Braxton	
March 15	"Un-Break My Heart"	Toni Braxton	
March 22	"Un-Break My Heart"	Toni Braxton	
March 29	"Un-Break My Heart"	Toni Braxton	
April 5	"Un-Break My Heart"	Toni Braxton	
April 12	"All by Myself"	Celine Dion	
April 19	"All by Myself"	Celine Dion	
April 26	"All by Myself"	Celine Dion	
May 3	"For the First Time"	Kenny Loggins	
May 10	"For the First Time"	Kenny Loggins	
May 17	"You Were Meant for Me"	Jewel	
May 24	"Butterfly Kisses"	Bob Carlisle	
May 31	"Butterfly Kisses"	Bob Carlisle	
June 7	"Butterfly Kisses"	Bob Carlisle	
June 14	"Butterfly Kisses"	Bob Carlisle	
June 21	"Butterfly Kisses"	Bob Carlisle	
June 28	"Butterfly Kisses"	Bob Carlisle	
July 5	"Butterfly Kisses"	Bob Carlisle	
July 12	"Here in My Heart"	Chicago	
July 19	"Go the Distance"	Michael Bolton	
July 26	"Go the Distance"	Michael Bolton	
August 2	"Go the Distance"	Michael Bolton	
August 9	"Sunny Came Home"	Shawn Colvin	
August 16	"Sunny Came Home"	Shawn Colvin	
August 23	"Sunny Came Home"	Shawn Colvin	
August 30	"Sunny Came Home"	Shawn Colvin	
September 6	"How Do I Live"	LeAnn Rimes	
September 13	"How Do I Live"	LeAnn Rimes	
September 20	"How Do I Live"	LeAnn Rimes	
September 27	"How Do I Live"	LeAnn Rimes	
October 4	"How Do I Live"	LeAnn Rimes	
October 11	"How Do I Live"	LeAnn Rimes	
October 18	"How Do I Live"	LeAnn Rimes	
October 25	"How Do I Live"	LeAnn Rimes	
November 1	"How Do I Live"	LeAnn Rimes	
November 8	"How Do I Live"	LeAnn Rimes	
November 15	"How Do I Live"	LeAnn Rimes	
November 22	"Something About the Way You Look Tonight"	Elton John	
November 29	"Something About the Way You Look Tonight"	Elton John	
December 6	"Something About the Way You Look Tonight"	Elton John	
December 13	"Something About the Way You Look Tonight"	Elton John	
December 20	"Something About the Way You Look Tonight"	Elton John	
December 27	"Something About the Way You Look Tonight"	Elton John	

== See also ==
- 1997 in music
- List of artists who reached number one on the U.S. Adult Contemporary chart
