= Keaggy =

Keaggy is a surname. Notable people with the surname include:

- Cheri Keaggy (born 1968), American gospel singer and songwriter
- Phil Keaggy (born 1951), American guitarist and vocalist
