= Here in My Heart (disambiguation) =

"Here in My Heart" is a 1952 song by Al Martino.

Here in My Heart may also refer to:

- "Here in My Heart" (Chicago song), a 1997 song by Chicago
- "Here in My Heart" (Tiffany song), a 1990 song by Tiffany Darwish
