= Sweet Comfort Band =

American Christian rock band

- Origin: Riverside, California, United States
- Genres: Christian rock, contemporary Christian music
- Years active: 1974–1984, 2013
- Labels: Maranatha!, Light, Retroactive
- Past members: Bryan Duncan; Kevin Thomson; Rick Thomson; Randy Thomas

Sweet Comfort Band was an American Christian rock band that first performed in 1973 in Riverside, California, and were active until 1984. The band was initially composed of keyboardist/lead vocalist, Bryan Duncan, and brothers Kevin (bass guitar) and Rick (drums/vocals) Thomson. The band was the brainchild of the Thomson brothers. Randy Thomas, guitarist/vocalist joined the group around 1976. After their second album, Sweet Comfort Band also became well known for their highly detailed, airbrushed album cover art by Kerne Erickson, a trend that had previously been considered too costly for Christian groups who did not produce the high-volume album sales of mainstream bands such as Kansas. The Sweet Comfort Band logo was created by Rick Griffin.

Sweet Comfort Band was a late entry into Jesus music with their 1977 self-titled release on Maranatha! Records. When they started, they had a funky, jazzy, R&B and 70's rock sound. This set them apart from many of the bands in the nascent Contemporary Christian music industry who were primarily performing folk-rock and soft rock. Few bands had the musicianship displayed by this quartet. However, Maranatha! decided to quit releasing rock and roll albums and focus on children's releases, gospel and worship music. Light Records welcomed them for their second release Breakin' The Ice. For the next six years they toured heavily to support their releases and the band drifted towards a more traditional radio-rock sound. Keyboardist, John Andrew Schreiner was added as a supplemental musician during their tours in later years, as Duncan took more of a vocal-heavy, lead frontman role on stage and away from performing integrated keyboard parts.

The band members went their separate ways in the summer 1984, culminating at their final concert near their home at Riverside Municipal Stadium after releasing six albums and garnering a large fan base. Bryan Duncan released a number of solo projects over the next eighteen years. Randy Thomas went on to found the band Allies and co-wrote radio hit Butterfly Kisses with former Allies band member Bob Carlisle. Rick Thomson co-produced a compilation album called Voices (Myrrh Records) in 1987 featuring CCM artists such as Bob Carlisle, Bryan Duncan, John Elefante, Tommy Funderburk, Benny Hester, Howard Mc Crary, Rick Riso, Matthew Ward and others. The project had numerous hits.

In 2001, the Sweet Comfort Band reunited briefly to perform together at 4 venues on the west and east coast.

Rick was also licensed as a General Contractor in 1982 and has run a successful construction business for over 40 years. In 1986 he built Shelter Sound Studio in Riverside County and continued as a prolific songwriter and producer. He built a larger building for Shelter Sound Studio in 1992 and closed the other location. Many mainstream and Christian artists have recorded and filmed videos at the larger studio. Sweet Comfort Band recorded their 7th project there. On January 13, 2010, the wife of Rick Thomson reported online that Rick Thomson, Randy Thomas, and Bryan Duncan were in the studio for the first time in over twenty-five years, having written several new songs. The Waiting Is Over was the resulting 2013 release.

Kevin Thomson, who was Rick Thomson's older brother and longtime bassist for the group, died on May 30, 2010, at age 57, after a long illness. Kevin's sons, Elijah Thomson stepped up to play the bass parts in the album along with his brother, Joshua who played rhythm guitar. Rick's long-time friends, Andrew Ford (bassist) and James Raymond (keyboards) also played on the record. The City of Prague Philharmonic orchestra also performed on two songs on The Waiting Is Over album, The title song, "The Waiting Is Over" and "Then I Remember".

== Band members ==
- Bryan Duncan – keyboards, vocals
- Kevin Thomson – bass guitar (died on May 30, 2010)
- Rick Thomson – drums, vocals
- Randy Thomas – guitars, vocals

== Discography ==
- Sweet Comfort – 1977 (Maranatha! Records)
- Breakin' the Ice – 1978 (Light Records)
- Hold on Tight – 1979 (Light Records)
- Hearts of Fire – 1981 (Light Records)
- Cutting Edge – 1982 (Light Records)
- Perfect Timing – 1984 (Light Records)
- The Waiting Is Over – 2013 (Shelter Sound Music, Inc.)

=== Compilations ===
- Prime time – 1985 (Light Records)
- The Light Years – 1996 (Light Records)

=== Reissues ===
- The Definitive Collection – 2001 reissue of Breakin' the Ice, Hold On Tight, Hearts of Fire and Cutting Edge (Millenium Eight Records)
- Breakin' the Ice – 2009 Remastered (Retroactive Records)
- Hold on Tight – 2009 Remastered (Retroactive Records)
- Hearts of Fire – 2009 Remastered (Retroactive Records)
- Cutting Edge – 2009 Remastered (Retroactive Records)
- Perfect Timing – 2009 Remastered (Retroactive Records)

=== Track lists ===
Sweet Comfort (1977)

- "It's So Fine (Soul Tune Boogie)" – 3:03
- "Ryan's Song" – 4:08
- "Childish Things" – 2:42
- "Let It Go" – 2:29
- "Your Life" – 2:25
- "Somebody Loves You" – 2:57
- "His Name Is Whispered" – 3:13
- "God's Got a Plan" – 3:14
- "Get Ready" – 3:04
- "When I Was Alone" – 3:46

Breakin' the Ice (1978)

- "Got to Believe" – 3:56
- "Breakin' the Ice" – 3:40
- "Young Girl" – 3:15
- "Melody/Harmony" – 3:20
- "I Need Your Love Again" – 4:50
- "Good Feelin'" – 4:00
- "Searchin' for Love" – 4:06
- "The Lord is Calling" – 3:56
- "I Love You with My Life" – 4:01

Hold On Tight (1979)

- "Hold On Tight" – 3:20
- "Take It – Save It" – 3:23
- "Falling Star" – 3:08
- "You're the One" – 3:13
- "Angel" – 3:13
- "Chasin' the Wind" – 3:32
- "Don't Tell Me You Love Me" – 3:10
- "Undecided" – 3:56
- "Carry Me" – 4:43
- "More Than You Need" – 4:35
- "Find Your Way" – 4:11

Hearts of Fire (1981)

- "Isabel" – 4:08
- "You Can Make It" – 2:44
- "They Just Go On" – 3:34
- "The Road" – 3:49
- "Feel Like Singin'" – 3:32
- "Now or Never" – 3:33
- "Can You Help Me?" – 3:50
- "Contender" – 3:10
- "Just Like Me" – 2:47
- "You Need a Reason" – 3:16

Cutting Edge (1982)

- "Runnin' to Win" – 4:06
- "What Have You Got?" – 3:10
- "Falling in Love With You" – 3:34
- "Haven't Seen You" – 4:47
- "Breakdown Love" – 3:12
- "Valerie" – 3:23
- "Changed Hearts" – 3:40
- "Live It" – 4:03
- "What Did It Mean?" – 3:31
- "Armed and Ready" – 4:47

Perfect Timing (1984)

- "Perfect Timing" – 3:29
- "Habit of Hate" – 3:52
- "You Led Me to Believe" – 5:06
- "Don't Bother Me Now" – 3:31
- "Computer Age" – 3:28
- "Sing for the Melody" – 3:42
- "Looking for the Answer" – 4:42
- "Envy and Jealousy" – 4:08
- "Prodigal's Regret (Never Should Have Left You)" – 4:54
- "Neighborhood Kids" – 3:48

The Waiting Is Over (2013)

- "Lay It All on the Line" – 4:57
- "Something Else Is Going on Here" – 4:07
- "Nothing Can Separate Us" – 4:23
- "Do You Love Me" – 4:47
- "Rock Steady" – 3:42
- "Then I Remember" – 4:36
- "All in Gods Hands" – 4:11
- "The Waiting Is Over" – 3:53
- "All Stand Together" – 3:41
- "Where Do We Go from Here" – 4:21
- "In the Light of Heaven" – 4:57
