= Allies (band) =

American Christian rock band

- Origin: United States
- Genres: Christian rock, contemporary Christian music
- Years active: 1985 – 1992
- Labels: Light, DaySpring
- Past members: Randy Thomas; Bob Carlisle; Sam Scott; Matthew Chapman; Jim Erickson; Kenny Williams; Scott Sheriff; Mark Hill; Brian Fullen

Allies was a Christian rock band. They released six albums during the late 1980s and early 1990s.

== Band members ==
The most notable band members were guitarist Randy Thomas, formerly of the Jesus music group Sweet Comfort Band and vocalist Bob Carlisle. Carlisle went on to pursue a solo career and recorded the hit song "Butterfly Kisses", which was co-written with Randy.

Sam O. Scott and Jimmy Erickson were both formerly of Psalm 150.

- Randy Thomas: lead guitar, vocals, bass
- Bob Carlisle: lead vocals, rhythm and acoustic guitars
- Sam O. Scott: keyboards, synth-bass, backing vocals (1984–1986)
- Matthew Chapman: bass, backing vocals (1985–1991)
- Jim Erickson: drums, backing vocals (1985–1991)
- Kenny Williams: keyboards, saxophone, backing vocals (1987, died 2019)
- Scott Sheriff: keyboards, backing vocals (1992)
- Mark Hill: bass, backing vocals (1992)
- Brian Fullen: drums (1992)

== History ==
Thomas formed the act in San Bernardino, California in 1984 by bringing together members of two of his former acts: he had been with Carlisle and Jimmy Erickson in Psalm 150 and was also at one time in the Band Sonrise with Sam Scott and Matt Chapman. (Scott was also part of Psalm 150 though not at the same time as Thomas.)

Light Records signed the group before they recorded a demo. The self-titled album, released in 1985, took the band name at face value as the group appeared on the album jacket in military fatigues.

== Discography ==
- Allies—1985 (Light Records) (Remastered CD, Girder Records, 2021)
- Virtues—1986 (Light Records) (Remastered CD, Girder Records, 2021)
- Shoulder to Shoulder—1987 (DaySpring Records)
- Long Way from Paradise—1989 (DaySpring)
- The River—1990 (DaySpring)
- Man with a Mission—1992 (DaySpring)
- The Light Years—1995 (Light Records) (compilation disc: contains three tracks from Allies and nine of the ten tracks from Virtues)
