= The Music of Christmas =

Studio album by Steven Curtis Chapman
- Released: September 26, 1995
- Studio: The Dugout, OmniSound Studios and Quad Studios (Nashville, Tennessee); Studio at Mole End and The Bennett House (Franklin, Tennessee); Devonshire Sound Studios (North Hollywood, California); Ocean Studio (Burbank, California); Sound on Sound Recording (New York City, New York); CTS Studios (London, England, UK)
- Genre: Christmas music, contemporary Christian music, rock, pop
- Length: 60:52
- Label: Sparrow
- Producer: Brown Bannister; Steven Curtis Chapman

Steven Curtis Chapman chronology
Heaven in the Real World (1994)	The Music of Christmas (1995)	Signs of Life (1996)

Professional ratings
Review scores
Source	Rating
AllMusic	3/5 stars
Jesus Freak Hideout	(not rated)

The Music of Christmas is the first Christmas album and seventh studio album overall by American contemporary Christian music singer and songwriter Steven Curtis Chapman. It was released on September 26, 1995.

== Track listing ==
All songs written and/or arranged by Steven Curtis Chapman, except where noted.

1. "Hark! The Herald Angels Sing/The Music Of Christmas"(Charles Wesley, Felix Mendelssohn, Chapman) – 6:43
2. "Christmas Is All In The Heart" (feat. CeCe Winans) – 5:15
3. "Angels We Have Heard on High" (Edward Shippen Barnes) – 5:39
4. "O Come, O Come, Emmanuel" (John Mason Neale, Henry Sloane Coffin, Chapman) – 3:28
5. "Our God Is With Us" (Chapman, Michael W. Smith) – 6:43
6. Interlude: "The Music Of Christmas" (Handel, Wesley, Mendelssohn, Barnes, Chapman, Buchanan) – 4:46
7. "This Baby" (William C. Dix, Chapman) – 4:35
8. "Silent Night/Away in a Manger/O Holy Night" (Franz Gruber, James R. Murray, Adolphe Adam, Chapman) – 6:03
9. "Carol of the Bells" (Mykola Leontovych, arranged by Chapman) – 3:44
10. "O Come All Ye Faithful" (John Francis Wade, Chapman) – 4:18
11. "Going Home For Christmas" (Chapman, James Isaac Elliot) – 5:25
12. "Precious Promise" – 4:12

== Personnel ==
- Steven Curtis Chapman – lead vocals, acoustic guitar (1, 2, 6, 7–12), hi-strung guitar (1, 9, 10), backing vocals (3, 7, 11), gut-string guitar (6, 8, 9), E-coustic guitar (9), dobro (9), hammered dulcimer (9), mandolin (9, 11), 12-string guitar (10, 11), Roland VG synth guitar (12)
- Robbie Buchanan – keyboards (1, 3, 5, 11), programming (6)
- Shane Keister – acoustic piano (1, 4, 11), keyboards (2, 7, 10)
- Scott Sheriff – keyboards (8)
- Blair Masters – programming (9)
- Gordon Kennedy – electric guitar (1, 3, 7, 11), backing vocals (1, 5, 10), acoustic guitar (5)
- Jerry McPherson – electric guitar (1, 2, 7, 10)
- Randy Pearce – electric guitar (3)
- Dann Huff – electric guitar (5)
- Paul Franklin – steel guitar (11)
- Leland Sklar – bass (1, 3, 5, 7, 11)
- Jimmie Lee Sloas – bass (2, 10)
- Steve Brewster – drums (1, 3, 5, 7, 11), programming (3, 7)
- Paul Leim – drums (2, 10)
- Terry McMillan – jingle bells (7)
- Ronn Huff – string arrangements (1, 3–6, 8–10, 12, choral arrangement (4, 8)
- Gavyn Wright – concertmaster (1, 3–6, 8–10, 12)
- The London Session Orchestra – strings (1, 3–6, 8–10, 12)
- Don Hart – string arrangements (2, 10)
- The Nashville String Machine – strings (2), additional strings (10)
- Max Carl – backing vocals (1, 5, 7, 10)
- Bob Carlisle – backing vocals (1, 5, 10)
- Lisa Cochran – backing vocals (1, 5, 10)
- Robin Johnson – backing vocals (1, 5, 10)
- Michael Mellett – backing vocals (1, 5, 10)
- The Belmont Church Choir – choir (1)
- The Kids Connection Choir – kids choir (1)
- CeCe Winans – harmony vocals (2)
- Bill Champlin – backing vocals (3)
- Tommy Funderburk – backing vocals (3, 7, 11)
- The American Boychoir – boychoir (4, 8), intro choir (7)
- Alan Arak – additional intro vocals (7)
- Robert Carpenter – additional intro vocals (7)
- Charles Eversole – additional intro vocals (7)
- Barry Phillips – additional intro vocals (7)
- Herb Chapman Jr. – backing vocals (8)
- Herb Chapman Sr. – backing vocals (8)
- Terry Wood – backing vocals (11)

== Production ==
- Dan Raines – executive producer
- Peter York – executive producer
- Steven Curtis Chapman – producer
- Brown Bannister – producer, additional engineer
- Steve Bishir – tracking (1, 3–9, 11), overdub engineer, string recording (2, 10)
- Jeff Balding – tracking (2, 10)
- Chris Dibble – orchestra recording (1, 3–6, 8–10, 12)
- Guy Defazio – additional engineer
- Patrick Kelly – additional engineer
- Martin Woodlee – additional engineer, assistant engineer
- Joey Grimstead – assistant engineer
- Aaron Swihart – assistant engineer
- Bill Schnee – mixing at Schnee Studio (North Hollywood, California)
- John Hendrickson – mix assistant
- Doug Sax – mastering at The Mastering Lab (Hollywood, California)
- Janet McMahon – music contractor for Kids Connection
- Penne Aust – music contractor for Kids Connection
- Traci Sterling Bishir – production coordinator
- Karen Phillpott – art direction
- Franke Design – cover
- East-West Design (Nashville, Tennessee) – design
- David Maisel – photography
- Johnny Villanueva – hair, make-up
- Jamie Kearney – stylist

== Charts ==
Album - Billboard (North America)

Year	Chart	Position
1995	200	61
1995	Top Contemporary Christian	2

== Certifications ==
Country	Sales	Certifications (sales thresholds)
United States (RIAA)	500,000	Gold
