= Regie Hamm =

American singer-songwriter (born 1967)

- Birth name: Regie Glenn Hamm
- Born: May 1, 1967 (age 58)
- Origin: Nashville, Tennessee, U.S.
- Genres: Pop; Christian music
- Occupations: Singer-songwriter; musician; producer
- Years active: 1990s-present
- Labels: Tate Records; Tate Music Group

Regie Hamm (born May 1, 1967) is an American singer-songwriter. He has credits as a songwriter, producer, musician (keys, drums, vocals), and artist.

== Early and personal life ==
Regie Hamm's father was a traveling Pentecostal minister. He played drums in his father's band at an early age and left for college. He is married to Yolanda and they adopted a girl from China, whom they named Isabella. Isabella has a rare genetic disorder called Angelman syndrome, which causes severe development delays. They also have a son, Gabe.

== Singing career ==
After college, Hamm began to have songwriting success. He has had songs recorded by artists including Kenny Loggins, Maxi Priest, Bob Carlisle, Jaci Velasquez, and Clay Crosse. He wrote "I Surrender All," one of the most popular Christian songs of the 90s and recorded by Clay Crosse. Hamm released a solo-CD entitled American Dreams on Universal South Records in 2003, and the CD had the Top 20 AC hit entitled "Babies." The song gained mainstream popularity after it was featured on Delilah Rene's nationally syndicated love-songs program.

SESAC's website reports that Hamm's new EP, titled Starlight, was released in conjunction with the American Idol finale on his website and shortly afterwards on iTunes.

== Songwriting career ==
In 2008, Hamm wrote a song called "The Time of My Life" at the encouragement of his wife, Yolanda, an avid American Idol fan. He submitted the song for the American Idol Songwriting Competition, and won. It was the song David Cook sang as his finale and the first single for Cook, the winner of the show's seventh season. The RIAA certified "The Time of My Life" as platinum on December 12, 2008 meaning it sold over 1 million digital downloads. The song was particularly successful on U.S. adult radio and reached number one on the Hot Adult Contemporary Tracks chart.

Hamm has written for Clay Aiken and Lonestar. He has had over 400 cuts as a songwriter and has been named SESAC songwriter of the year four times. Hamm has a solo album titled Set It on Fire and a book titled Angels & Idols, which were to be released on June 15, 2010. In February 2016, he wrote "We Got Lucky", a song with Army veteran Scott Sullivan, a physician assistant who served in heavy combat in Sadr City in Baghdad, Iraq at a front-line aid station whch received multiple combat patients.

== Discography ==
=== Albums ===
- American Dreams (Universal South Records, 2003)
- Set It On Fire (2010)

== Awards and nominations ==
Award	Year
SESAC Writer of the Year	1995 1996 1997 2000
American Idol Songwriter	2008
Dove Award Nomination	1995 1996 2002
