= No Longer My Own =

Studio album by Cheri Keaggy
- Released: August 7, 2015
- Studios: Kegsworth Studio, Nashville, Tennessee; The Attic, Franklin, Tennessee
- Genres: Worship, CCM
- Length: 43:50
- Label: Psalm 91
- Producer: Cheri Keaggy

Cheri Keaggy chronology
So I Can Tell (2012)	No Longer My Own (2015)

No Longer My Own is the seventh studio album by Cheri Keaggy. Psalm 91 Records released the album on August 7, 2015. Keaggy self-produced the entire album.

== Critical reception ==
Professional ratings
Review scores
Source	Rating
CCM Magazine	3/5 stars
The Phantom Tollbooth	4/5

Awarding the album three stars for CCM Magazine, Jamie Walker states, "No Longer My Own ... showcases her classic alto vocals and knack for catchy piano driven melodies ... The self-produced project is decisively pop with hints of gospel." Michael Dalton, giving the album a four out of five at The Phantom Tollbooth, writes, "The music jogs along with a sober assessment of the pain and evil in the world ... Choices like this are indicative of the maturity found on this release."

== Track listing ==
Standard edition
No.	Title	Length
1.	"Overcome"	5:08
2.	"You Save Me"	5:04
3.	"You Go Before"	3:53
4.	"No Longer My Own"	3:03
5.	"Lucky to Be Breathing Your Air"	3:49
6.	"Lead Me to Your Love"	4:13
7.	"Be My Sabbath"	4:07
8.	"Jesus, One and Only"	3:01
9.	"I Love Your Company"	4:04
10.	"Whatever Is True (Phil. 4:8)"	2:58
11.	"The Giving Song"	4:30
Total length:		43:50

== Personnel ==
- Cheri Keaggy – lead vocals, backing vocals, acoustic piano
- Blair Masters – keyboards, acoustic piano, accordion, pump organ
- David Cleveland – electric guitars, mandolin
- Scott Denté – acoustic guitars, backing vocals
- Phil Keaggy – ukulele
- Matt Pierson – bass
- Ken Lewis – drums, percussion
- Christine Denté – backing vocals
- Jason Eskridge – backing vocals

Production

- Cheri Keaggy – producer, executive producer, liner notes
- Scott Denté – additional producer
- Bill Whittington – vocal producer, engineer, mixing
- Amy Marie – assistant engineer, mix assistant
- Jim DeMain – mastering at Yes Master, Nashville, Tennessee
- Sandra Ney – creative direction
- Sarah Newson – design
- Michael Gomez – photography
