= Joyrider =

Joyrider may refer to:

- Joyride (crime), a crime involving stealing cars
- Joyrider (band), a rock band from Portadown, Northern Ireland
- The Joyriders, a 1999 American crime drama film
- "Joyriders", a song from the 1994 album His 'n' Hers by Pulp
- "Joyrider", a 1999 song by Colour Girl

== See also ==
- Joyride (disambiguation)
