= The Live Adventure =

Live album by Steven Curtis Chapman
- Released: September 3, 1993
- Recorded: May 6, 1993
- Genre: Contemporary Christian music, rock, pop
- Length: 68:57
- Label: Sparrow
- Producer: Phil Naish; Steven Curtis Chapman

Steven Curtis Chapman chronology
| The Great Adventure (1992) | The Live Adventure (1993) | Heaven in the Real World (1994) |

Professional ratings
Review scores
| Source | Rating |
|---|---|
| AllMusic | 3/5 stars |
| Jesus Freak Hideout | (not rated) |

The Live Adventure is the first live album by Steven Curtis Chapman, released on September 3, 1993. The album was recorded on May 6, 1993, during Chapman's tour for The Great Adventure. The album was released on September 7, 1993, to CD, cassette, and VHS tape formats (VHS tape format includes an alternative box cover).

The concert video won the 1994 Gospel Music Association award for Long Form Music Video of the Year, and the song "Go There with You" won the title of Pop/Contemporary Recorded Song of the Year. The album brought Chapman his third Grammy Award, for Best Pop/Contemporary Gospel Album, in 1994. The concert video was directed by Michael Salomon, and edited by Salomon, Scott C. Wilson, and Steve Rasch.

== Track listing ==
1. "Prologue" – 1:05
2. "The Great Adventure" – 4:46
3. "That's Paradise" – 4:42
4. "Introduction" – 1:14
5. "Go There with You" – 5:15
6. "Busy Man" – 4:41
7. "Great Adventure Stuff" – 4:49
8. Acoustic Medley: – 12:13
  - "My Redeemer Is Faithful and True"
  - "His Eyes"
  - "Waiting for Lightning"(S. Chapman, Tony Elenburg)
  - "When You are a Soldier"
  - "Heart's Cry"
  - "His Strength Is Perfect"
9. "Family Talk" – 5:53
10. "More to This Life" – 6:28
11. "For the Sake of the Call" – 7:41
12. "I Will Be Here" – 4:09
13. "My Turn Now" – 3:32
14. "No Better Place" – 5:34

== VHS Track listing ==
Set 1

1. "Prologue"
2. "The Great Adventure"
3. "That's Paradise"
4. "Go There with You"
5. "Busy Man"

Set 2

1. "Great Adventure Stuff"
2. Acoustic Medley:
  - "My Redeemer Is Faithful and True"
  - "His Eyes"
  - "Waiting for Lightning"
  - "When You are a Soldier"
  - "Heart's Cry"
  - "His Strength Is Perfect"
3. "More to This Life"

Set 3

1. "For the Sake of the Call"
2. "Me & Herbie"
3. "This Could Be Love..."
4. "I Will Be Here"
5. "Got to B Tru"

Encore

1. "My Turn Now"
2. "No Better Place"

== Personnel ==
- Steven Curtis Chapman – lead vocals, acoustic guitar, electric guitar

=== Steven's Band ===
- Scott Sheriff – keyboards, backing vocals
- Dale Oliver – lead guitars, backing vocals
- David Cleveland – rhythm guitars, mandolin, backing vocals
- Arlin Troyer – bass, backing vocals
- Dennis Kurttila – drums, backing vocals

== Production ==
- Producers – Phil Naish and Steven Curtis Chapman
- Production Coordination – Bridget Evans O'Lannerghty
- Engineer – Don Worsham
- House Engineers – Dan Fraser and Ron Pasdernick
- Monitor Engineer – Rob Nevalainen
- Additional Location Recording – Steve Culp, Matt Shaw, and Steve Smith.
- Mixing and Additional Recording – Ronnie Brookshire
- Additional Second Engineer – Todd Robbins
- Recorded live at Seattle, WA.
- Additional location recording at Remote Control (Seattle, WA).
- Mixing and additional recording at Studio at Mole End (Franklin, TN).
- Production Manager, Stage and Lighting Design – Dan Brunelle
- Lighting – Christie Lights
- Additional Light Programming – Mitch Peeble
- Art Direction – Karen Philpott
- Photography – Frank Micelotta
- Technical Crew – Todd Anvik, Chris Belt, Andy Bishop, Brad Bylsma, Ron Eliovitz, Rob MacArthur, Ted Odell, Scott Peterson, Gordon Ponak and Lance Very.
- Drivers – Brad Bylsma, Greg Davidson, Mark Davidson, Scott Davis, and Paul Hortop.
