= Heaven in the Real World =

Studio album by Steven Curtis Chapman
- Released: July 5, 1994
- Studios: Schnee Studios (North Hollywood, California); Capitol Studios (Hollywood, California); The Hit Factory (New York City, New York); Quad Studios and Mid-Town Tone and Volume (Nashville, Tennessee); Studio at Mole End and North Beach Studio (Franklin, Tennessee)
- Genres: Contemporary Christian music, rock, pop
- Length: 55:25
- Label: Sparrow (EMI)
- Producers: Phil Naish; Steven Curtis Chapman

Steven Curtis Chapman chronology
The Live Adventure (1993)	Heaven in the Real World (1994)	The Music of Christmas (1995)

Professional ratings
Review scores
Source	Rating
Allmusic	3/5 stars
Jesus Freak Hideout	(not rated)

Heaven in the Real World is the sixth studio album by American contemporary Christian music singer and songwriter Steven Curtis Chapman released on July 5, 1994, by Sparrow Records. It was his first album under EMI ownership of Sparrow, which had been announced in October 1992.

It was certified gold by the end of the year, nominated for a 1995 Grammy award, and went platinum on February 7, 1997. The title song received the 1995 Gospel Music Association award for best Pop/Contemporary Song of the Year, and the album earned Pop/Contemporary Album of the Year, at the 26th GMA Dove Awards. (The title track was performed during the broadcast of the 25th GMA Dove Awards the previous year.)

== Track listing ==
All songs written by Steven Curtis Chapman, except where noted.

1. "Heaven in the Real World" – 4:50
2. "King of the Jungle" – 4:55
3. "Dancing with the Dinosaur" – 4:46
4. "The Mountain" (Chapman, Geoff Moore) – 4:56
5. "Treasure of You" (Chapman, Moore) – 4:41
6. "Love and Learn" – 4:09
7. "Burn the Ships" (Chapman, James Elliot) – 4:56
8. "Remember Your Chains" – 5:22
9. "Heartbeat of Heaven" – 5:07
10. "Still Listening" – 4:32
11. "Facts Are Facts" (Chapman, Moore) – 3:30
12. "Miracle of Mercy" – 2:39
13. "Heartbeat of Heaven" (reprise) – 0:57

== Personnel ==
- Steven Curtis Chapman – lead vocals, backing vocals (1–5, 7, 9–11, 13), acoustic guitars (1, 4, 6–8, 10), dobro (2), electric guitars (10), classical guitar (12)
- Phil Naish – keyboards
- Dann Huff – electric guitars (1–9, 11, 13), classical guitar solo (6, 9, 13), acoustic guitar solo (8), additional electric guitars (10), slide guitar solo (11)
- Dan Dugmore – dobro (4), steel guitar (6)
- Leland Sklar – bass (1–9, 11, 13)
- Danny O'Lannerghty – fretless bass (12)
- John Robinson – drums (1–9, 11, 13)
- Mark Hammond – drum programming (2), percussion (3, 4)
- Paulinho da Costa – percussion (9, 10, 12, 13)
- Barry Green – trombone (2)
- Chris McDonald – trombone (2), horn arrangements (2)
- Jeff Bailey – trumpet (2)
- Mike Haynes – trumpet (2)
- Jeff Mac – wave sequencing (3)
- David Naish – "pterodactyl" overdub (3)
- Conni Ellisor – string arrangements and conductor (6, 9, 12, 13)
- Carl Gorodetsky – concertmaster (6, 9, 13)
- The Nashville String Machine – strings (6, 9, 13)
- John Catchings – cello (12)
- Anthony LaMarchina – cello (12)
- Bob Mason – cello (12)
- Hezekiah Walker and The Love Fellowship Crusade Choir – choir (1, 2)
- Michael Gleason – backing vocals (1–5, 7, 9–11, 13)
- Mark Heimermann – backing vocals (1, 2, 5, 7)
- Michael Mellett – backing vocals (3, 4, 9–11, 13)

Voice-overs on "Heaven in the Real World"

- James Isaac Elliot, Steve LePard, Brad Winget and Charles Colson

Children's choir on "Still Listening"

- Emily Chapman, Caleb Chapman and Will Franklin Chapman

Shoutback on "Facts Are Facts"

- Calvin Bottoms, Dan Brunelle, Steven Curtis Chapman, Dave Huffman, Dennis Kurtilla and Phil Naish

== Production ==
- Dan Raines – executive producer
- Peter York – executive producer
- Phil Naish – producer
- Steven Curtis Chapman – producer
- Ed Cherney – instrumental track recording
- Ronnie Brookshire – overdub and vocal recording
- Bill Schnee – mixing
- Lars Aakre – assistant engineer
- Dave Dillbeck – assistant engineer
- Peter Doell – assistant engineer
- Koji Egawa – assistant engineer
- John Hendrickson – assistant engineer, additional engineer, mix assistant
- Todd Robbins – assistant engineer, additional engineer
- Dan Garcia – additional engineer
- Jay Healy – additional engineer
- Jeremy Smith – additional engineer
- Doug Sax – mastering at The Mastering Lab (Los Angeles, California)
- Bridgett Evans O'Lannerghty – production coordinator
- Karen Philpott – creative design
- East-West Design Group (Nashville, Tennessee) – design
- Gerhart Yurkovic – cover photography
- E.J. Carr – additional photos
- John Guider – stock photos
- Robert Glover – stock photos
- Skip O'Rourke – stock photos
- Johnny Villanueva – hair and make-up
- Jeffrey Tay – stylist
