= Can't Keep this Feeling In =

Single by Cliff Richard

from the album Real as I Wanna Be
- Released: October 12, 1998
- Recorded: 1998
- Studio: Little America Recording Studios, Weiler, Austria
- Genre: Blue-eyed soul
- Label: EMI
- Songwriters: Arnie Roman, Dennis Lambert, Steve Skinner
- Producer: Peter Wolf

Cliff Richard singles chronology
"Be with Me Always" (1996)	"Can't Keep this Feeling In" (1998)	"The Miracle" (1999)

Music video
- "Can't Keep this Feeling In" on YouTube

"Can't Keep this Feeling In" was the lead single from Cliff Richard's 1998 album Real as I Wanna Be, released a week prior to the album. The song, co-written by Arnie Roman, Dennis Lambert and Steve Skinner, debuted and peaked at number 10 on the UK Singles Chart.

== Blacknight version ==
Before the actual release of the single, a heavily remixed dance version called "Can't Keep This Feeling In" (Step Child Mix) was sent out to 240 radio stations under the pseudonym "Blacknight". It resulted in the track being added to playlists on many UK radio stations including Choice FM and Kiss 100.

Richard had been complaining about his deliberate exclusion from airplay on UK radio stations (not including BBC Radio 2). So this ruse was concocted in an attempt to circumvent prejudice that had increasingly led to Richard's exclusion. Richard picked the song because as he says "it was a slow, black rhythm and blues style and had a lot of falsetto, I felt I wasn't too recognizable".

The song as interpreted by "Blacknight" received complimentary comments from DJs. Choice FM DJ Jerry Bascombe said, "It is a great record and it took about four days to realise the identity of the artist. I suppose, to be honest, if we knew it was by Cliff we would have never played it, so it proves his point. Now we'll go on playing it regardless."

== The ruse ==
The ruse was revealed to the UK press in time for the Sunday papers as part of a strategic plan to highlight ageism in the music industry.

After the revelation, the single was released with due credit to Cliff Richard as the debut single from the album Real as I Wanna Be. The single reached number 10 on the British Singles Chart.

A special two-part CD package was also released with the second CD containing the Step Child remix used under the pseudonym Blacknight as a ruse to the radio stations.

== Track listing ==
Single

- "Can't Keep This Feeling In" (3:50)

Special two-part CD set

- CD1:
1. "Can't Keep This Feeling In" (mixed by Peter Wolf) - Written by Arnie Roman, Dennis Lambert, Steve Skinner (3:50)
2. "Larger Design" (mixed by Peter Wolf) - Written by Michelle Wolf, Peter Wolf (3:06)
3. "Can't Keep This Feeling In" (5AM Little America Mix) - Mixed by Black, Bryce, Mendelsohn, Wolf - Written by Arnie Roman, Dennis Lambert, Steve Skinner (6:26)
- CD2
1. "Can't Keep This Feeling In" (3:50)
2. "After This Love" (5:01)
3. "Can't Keep This Feeling In" (Step Child Mix) - Remixed by Stepchild (5:05)
