= Here in My Heart (Chicago song) =

1997 song by Chicago

- Australian CD cover

Single by Chicago

from the album The Heart of Chicago 1967-1997
- A-side: "The Only One"
- Released: March 1997
- Recorded: 1997
- Genre: Pop; soft rock
- Length: 4:15
- Label: Reprise
- Songwriters: Glen Ballard; James Newton Howard
- Producer: James Newton Howard

Chicago singles chronology
"Dream a Little Dream of Me" (1995)	"Here in My Heart" (1997)	"The Only One" (1997)

"Here in My Heart" is a 1997 song written by Glen Ballard and James Newton Howard and performed by Chicago. Keyboardist Bill Champlin sang the lead vocals for the verses and chorus and the band's bassist Jason Scheff sang the bridge.

It was one of two new songs from The Heart of Chicago 1967-1997. "Here in My Heart" was the group's eighth and final number one on the Billboard Adult Contemporary chart, and also reached No. 59 on the Hot 100 Airplay chart. It was the band's first song to appear on the Billboard Adult Contemporary chart since "You Come to My Senses" in 1991 and their first to top that listing since "Look Away" in 1988.

== Background ==
"Here in My Heart" was originally intended to be part of a movie score; it later received lyrics from Ballard and Howard and was submitted to Chicago for inclusion on their The Heart of Chicago 1967-1997 compilation album. Lee Loughnane called "Here in My Heart" a "great song" and expressed surprise that it did not "cross over into the top ten." Walter Parazaider felt that "Here in My Heart" could have benefited from additional horns from himself, Loughnane, and James Pankow, but was otherwise pleased with the song. Pankow was more critical of the song, particularly with the mixing of the horns. He had previously provided feedback to Howard on how to adjust the mix more to his specifications, but said that these recommendations were ignored.

I worked with him and he sent me a rough mix, and I said, 'Hey James, the horns are buried. You can't even hear them.' He said, 'Oh well. That's just a rough mix. Don't worry about it, I know your level.' And I said, 'Not only that, but the tenor's too hot in the mix. It doesn't have that round, fat Chicago characteristic to it.' And he said, 'Yeah, yeah, I know.' And then I got the final mix. No change. That was 'Here In My Heart'. I found it more than a little insulting that the guy would stroke me and tell me this is just a rough mix and then for posterity, forever on disc and for the rest of the world to hear is a horn section that sounds like shit. It's not mixed properly.

== Critical reception ==
Billboard wrote that the song "combine[s] the sugar-pop gloss of its Peter Cetera era with the horn-laden jazz of its prog-rock salad days", adding that the end result was "mildly engaging, though not wildly commercial." Stephen Thomas Erlewine of AllMusic felt that "Here in My Heart" "fell flat" as a song on The Heart of Chicago 1967-1997.

== Charts ==
=== Weekly charts ===
Chart (1997)	Peak position
US Radio Songs (Billboard)	59
US Adult Contemporary (Billboard)	1

=== Year-end charts ===
Chart (1997)	Position
US Adult Contemporary (Billboard)	17

== See also ==
- List of Billboard Adult Contemporary number ones of 1997
