= Joyride (Bryan Duncan album) =

Studio album by Bryan Duncan
- Released: 2001
- Studios: The Sound Kitchen (Franklin, Tennessee)
- Genre: CCM
- Length: 44:44
- Label: Diadem Music
- Producer: Mark Baldwin

Bryan Duncan chronology
Love Takes Times (1999)	Joyride (2001)	Twin Cities Live (2003)

Professional ratings
Review scores
Source	Rating
AllMusic	4.5/5 stars
Cross Rhythms	9/10 squares
Crosswalk.com	C−
The Dallas Morning News	favorable

Joyride is the 13th studio album by contemporary Christian music singer Bryan Duncan.

== Track listing ==
All tracks are written by Bryan Duncan except where noted.

No.	Title	Writer(s)	Length
1.	"I'd Like to Thank You Jesus (For One Thing)"	Duncan, Jaymes Felix	4:27
2.	"Maybe I'm Amazed"	Paul McCartney	5:45
3.	"It Gets Better"	Duncan, Chuck Barth	3:11
4.	"Holiday 'N Heaven"	Duncan, Bob Harty	4:10
5.	"Everything In the Garden"		4:28
6.	"I'll Always Have Jesus"	Duncan, John Andrew Schreiner	4:07
7.	"Clap Your Hands" (featuring Ashley Cleveland)		3:50
8.	"If You Pray for Me"	Duncan, Chuck Barth	4:35
9.	"Where There's Love" (featuring Donnie McClurkin)	Duncan, Mark Baldwin, Mark Douthit	4:09
10.	"The Battle Is the Lord's"	V. Michael McKay	6:02

== Personnel ==
- Bryan Duncan – lead vocals, handclaps (7)
- Jim Hammerly – acoustic piano (1, 10), Hammond B3 organ (1)
- Blair Masters – keyboards (2, 4, 5, 7–9), keyboard programming (2), synthesizers (3), Wurlitzer electric piano (3), organ (10)
- Pat Coil – Hammond B3 organ (3, 8), acoustic piano (5, 6), organ (7)
- Mark Baldwin – track arrangements, guitars (1–3, 5, 6, 8–10), guitar programming (2), slide guitar solo (3), acoustic guitar (4), electric guitar (4), handclaps (7), backing vocals (8)
- Jackie Street – bass guitar (1–5, 7–10)
- Craig Nelson – string bass (6)
- John Hammond – drums (1–3, 5, 7–9), drum programming (1, 3, 5, 7–9)
- Steve Brewster – drums (4, 6, 10), drum programming (4)
- Eric Darken – additional drums (8), percussion (8, 9)
- Mark Douthit – saxophones (1, 4, 5, 9), EWI (4, 9)
- Chris McDonald – trombone (1), horn arrangements (1)
- Mike Haynes – trumpet (1, 4, 5)
- Chad Dickerson – backing vocals (1, 2)
- Darwin Hobbs – backing vocals (1, 2)
- Joy Lagana Chambley – backing vocals (1, 2)
- Tiffany Palmer – backing vocals (1, 2)
- Leanne Palmore – backing vocals (1, 2)
- Angela Primm – backing vocals (1, 2)
- Chance Scoggins – backing vocals (1, 2)
- Marcia Ware – backing vocals (1, 2)
- Aimee Joy Weimer – backing vocals (1, 2)
- Terry White – backing vocals (1, 2)
- Jerard Woods – backing vocals (1, 2)
- Jovaun Woods – backing vocals (1, 2)
- Lisa Bevill – backing vocals (3, 8)
- Gene Miller – backing vocals (3, 7)
- Chris Rodriguez – backing vocals (3, 7)
- Lisa Cochran – backing vocals (4–6)
- Marabeth Jordan – backing vocals (4–6)
- Ashley Cleveland – lead vocals (7)
- Bonnie Keen – backing vocals (8)
- Marty McCall – backing vocals (8)
- Donnie McClurkin – lead vocals (9)

Production

- Dean Diehl – executive producer
- George King – executive producer
- Mark Baldwin – producer
- John Jaszcz – recording, mixing
- Grant Green – assistant engineer
- Rob Graves – remix arrangement
- Hank Williams – mastering at MasterMix (Nashville, Tennessee)
- Scott Hughes – art direction
- Ron Roark – design
- Matthew Barnes – photography
