= Raybon Brothers =

American country music duo

- Origin: Florida, United States
- Genres: Country
- Years active: 1997
- Label: MCA Nashville
- Spinoff of: Shenandoah
- Past members: Marty Raybon; Tim Raybon

Raybon Brothers were an American country music duo from Sanford, Florida, consisting of brothers Marty Raybon and Tim Raybon. Prior to the duo's inception in 1997, Marty Raybon was the lead singer of the country music band Shenandoah, having left in 1997, before rejoining in 2014.

The Raybon Brothers charted in 1997 with a cover of Bob Carlisle's pop hit "Butterfly Kisses". Their version was a top 40 hit on both the Billboard country music charts and the Billboard Hot 100. A second single, "The Way She's Lookin'", reached the lower regions of the country charts. Marty recorded a number of solo projects before rejoining Shenandoah.

== Discography ==
=== Studio albums ===
Title	Album details
Raybon Brothers	Release date: August 26, 1997; Label: MCA Records; Formats: CD, cassette

=== Singles ===
Year	Single	Peak chart positions			Certifications (sales threshold)	Album
Year	Single	US Country	US	CAN Country	Certifications (sales threshold)	Album
1997	"Butterfly Kisses"	37	22	36	US: Gold	Raybon Brothers
1997	"The Way She's Lookin'"	64	—	73		Raybon Brothers
1997	"Falling" (featuring Olivia Newton-John)	—	—	96		Raybon Brothers
"—" denotes releases that did not chart

=== Music videos ===
Year	Video	Director
1997	"Butterfly Kisses"	Steven R. Monroe
1997	"The Way She's Lookin"	
1997	"Falling" (featuring Olivia Newton-John)	
