= Marty Raybon =

American country singer (born 1959)

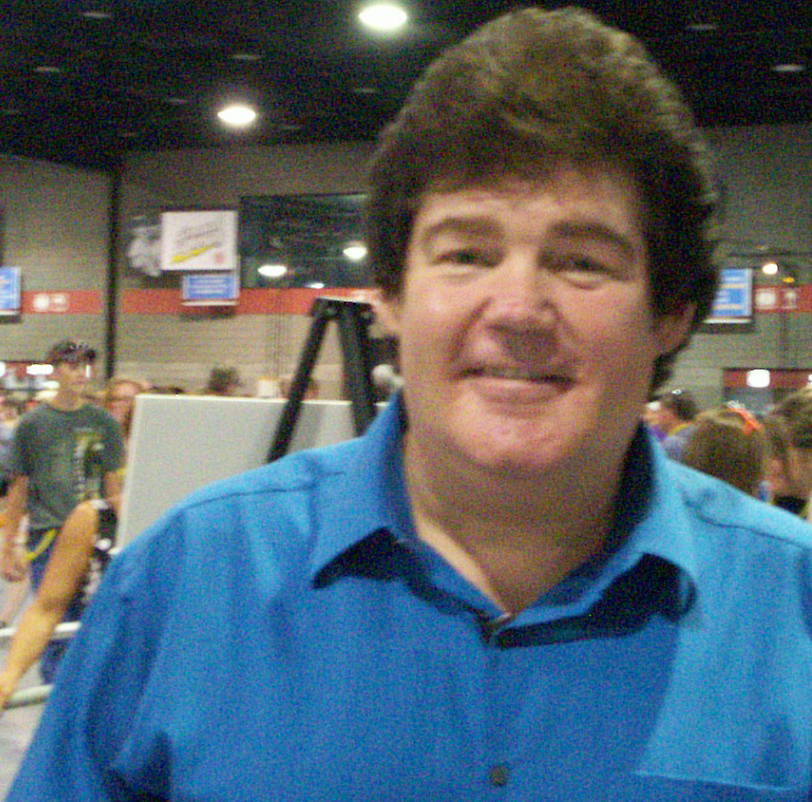
- Raybon at CMA Music Festival in 2010

Background information
- Born: Marlon Raybon; December 8, 1959 (age 66); Greenville, Alabama
- Genres: Country, Christian country, Bluegrass
- Occupations: Singer, songwriter
- Instruments: Vocals, acoustic guitar
- Years active: 1985–present
- Labels: Sparrow, Tri Chord, Doobie Shea, Dakota Sky, Rural Rhythm
- Member of: Shenandoah
- Formerly of: Raybon Brothers
- Website: MartyRaybon.com

Marlon "Marty" Raybon (born December 8, 1959) is an American country music artist. He is known primarily for his role as the lead singer of the country band Shenandoah, a role which he held from 1985 to 1997, until he rejoined the band in 2014. He recorded his first solo album, Marty Raybon, in 1995 on Sparrow Records. Before leaving Shenandoah in 1997, he and his brother Tim formed a duo known as the Raybon Brothers, which had crossover success that year with the hit single "Butterfly Kisses".

The Raybon Brothers split up in 1997, and Marty Raybon resumed his career as a solo artist. A second self-titled album was released in 2000, followed by 2003's Full Circle. 2006 saw the release of When the Sand Runs Out, which included the single "Shenandoah Saturday Night".

== Discography ==
=== Albums ===
Title	Album details	Peak positions
Title	Album details	US Bluegrass
Marty Raybon	Release date: July 18, 1995; Label: Chordant Records	—
Marty Raybon	Release date: February 15, 2000; Label: Tri Chord Records	—
Full Circle	Release date: March 11, 2003; Label: Doobie Shea Records	—
When the Sand Runs Out	Release date: November 21, 2006; Label: Aspirion Records	—
This, That & the Other	Release date: April 30, 2009; Label: self-released	—
At His Best	Release date: April 6, 2010; Label: Hi Five	—
Hand to the Plow	Release date: March 27, 2012; Label: Rural Rhythm	—
Southern Roots & Branches (Yesterday & Today)	Release date: April 10, 2012; Label: Rural Rhythm	—
The Back Forty	Release date: March 26, 2013; Label: Rural Rhythm	14
"—" denotes releases that did not chart

=== Singles ===
Year	Single	Peak positions	Album
Year	Single	US Country	Album
2000	"Cracker Jack Diamond"	63	Marty Raybon (2000)
2000	"Searching for the Missing Peace"	—	Marty Raybon (2000)
2003	"Summertown Road"	—	Full Circle
2003	"The Christmas Letter"	—	—N/a
2006	"Shenandoah Saturday Night"	—	When the Sand Runs Out
2007	"Who Are You"	—	When the Sand Runs Out
2010	"Daddy Phone"	—	At His Best
2010	"The Heat Is On"	—	At His Best
2011	"All in the Hands of Jesus"	—	Hand to the Plow
2011	"You've Got to Move"	—	Hand to the Plow
2012	"I've Seen What He Can Do"	—	Hand to the Plow
2013	"That Janie Baker"	—	The Back Forty
2013	"Working on a Building" (with Trace Adkins, T. Graham Brown, and Jimmy Fortune)	—	Working on a Building
"—" denotes releases that did not chart

=== Music videos ===
Year	Video	Director
1994	"Sweet Beulah Land"	Stan Strickland
1995	"Daddy Talks to Jesus"	Greg Crutcher
2000	"Cracker Jack Diamond"	Mare Said
2000	"Searching for the Missing Peace"	Peter Zavadil
2003	"The Christmas Letter"	
2006	"Shenandoah Saturday Night"	
2010	"Daddy Phone"	Michael Salomon
2011	"I've Seen What He Can Do"	
2012	"Working on a Building"	Mark Carman
2013	"God Didn't Choose Sides"	
