= Clay Crosse =

American musician

- Born: February 11, 1967 (age 58)
- Origin: Memphis, Tennessee
- Genres: Contemporary Christian, inspirational
- Instrument: Voice
- Years active: 1994–present
- Labels: Reunion

Clay Crosse (born Walter Clayton Crossnoe, February 11, 1967) is a contemporary Christian music artist. He has won four GMA Dove Awards, and is probably best known for the single "I Surrender All".

== Music career ==
Clay Crosse grew up in Memphis, Tennessee, and became a Christian at the age of 13. He married his high school sweetheart, Renee Kennedy. Initially, Clay worked as a courier for FedEx for six years. He then released his first album, My Place Is With You, in 1994. "I Surrender All" was the most successful single from the album. With the success of his musical career, Clay was able to leave FedEx and concentrate on music full-time in 1994.

Clay's music has a pop style. He became known for singles such as "I Surrender All", "Midnight Cry", "He Walked A Mile", "Saving The World", and "I Will Follow Christ". He won the Dove Award for "New Artist of the Year" at the 25th GMA Dove Awards in 1994. Nine songs from his first four albums became No. 1 singles, and "He Walked A Mile" won the 1997 CCM Adult Contemporary Song of the Year. In 1999, his song "I Will Follow Christ" won the Dove Award for Inspirational Song of the Year. He collaborated on the song with Bob Carlisle and BeBe Winans.

Following his initial success, Clay went through a time of contemplation and reckoning in his life, one that he describes as "the greatest time of spiritual growth I had ever experienced." After having difficulties with his singing voice, Clay hired a vocal coach, Chris Beatty. At their first appointment, Beatty questioned him about his spiritual life. After praying with the coach that day, Crosse confessed to his wife that he had been struggling with his thought life and that pornography had played a role. It took one year for his relationship with his wife to fully heal. Later, Clay stated that he was thankful that God protected and strengthened his and Renee's marriage during this time. With the changes in his personal life, Clay released A Different Man in 1999. The songs "98", "Sinner's Prayer" and "Arms of Jesus" were written reflecting his personal growth. Touring with Jaci Velasquez, he spoke to teenagers, encouraging sexual abstinence before marriage. He also worked in conjunction with the national student movement True Love Waits. Clay states, "During this life-changing time for me there was a clear change in my career. What was once a focus on 'Christian entertainment' was now a genuine calling to the ministry."

Clay then began working in local ministry, serving as worship pastor for The Love of Christ (TLC) Community Church in Memphis under head pastor Dana Key (of the Christian Rock group DeGarmo and Key). This was Clay's first staff position at a local church. During this time, he signed a deal with the TAG Artist Group to release the CD and DVD Eternity With You: Live Worship. The release of the CD and DVD coincided with the publication of his book I Surrender All. In 2007, he released the single "Believe".

Clay has served as lead worship pastor at the following churches: First Baptist Church of Winter Garden, Winter Garden, Florida 2023-present; First Baptist Church, Bentonville, Arkansas 2013–2023; Faith Baptist Church, Arlington, Tennessee 2010 - 2013; The Love of Christ Church (TLC) 2004 - 2008.

== Personal life ==
Clay married Renee Kennedy in 1990. They have four children, Shelby (1993), Savannah (1997), Garrett (1999, adopted from China in 2007), and Sophie (2005, adopted from China in 2005).

Clay and Renee Crosse co-wrote a book with Mark Tabb titled I Surrender All. Clay also authored the book Dashboard Jesus: Distinctive Reminders for Distracted Men. Renee has authored the books Rare Girl and Reclaiming Stolen Intimacy.

== Discography ==
Clay Crosse has released a total of ten albums: seven studio albums, two compilation albums, one live worship album, and one Christmas album.

=== Albums ===
- 1993: My Place Is With You (Reunion)
- 1995: Time To Believe (Reunion)
- 1997: Stained Glass (Reunion) – #141 on the Billboard 200
- 1999: I Surrender All: The Clay Crosse Collection, Vol. 1 (Reunion) – compilation
- 2000: A Different Man (Reunion)
- 2002: Christmas With Clay Crosse (Butterfly)
- 2005: Eternity With You: Live Worship (TAG Artist Group) – CD/DVD live worship album
- 2005: Simply Clay Crosse (Brentwood Music) – compilation
- 2009: Anthems (HolyHomes)
- 2011: Everytime I Feel the Spirit (HolyHomes)
- 2012: Rededication (Ccm Forever Music)
- 2019: Freewill Offering (Inov8 Music)

=== Singles ===
- 1993: "My Place Is With You"
- 1994: "I Surrender All"
- 1994: "I Call Your Name"
- 1995: "His Love's Comin' Over Me"
- 1995: "His Love Is Strong"
- 1995: "The Blood Will Never Lose Its Power"
- 1996: "The Rock"
- 1996: "Time to Believe"
- 1997: "Saving the World"
- 1997: "He Walked a Mile"
- 1998: "Must Have Been Your Hands"
- 1998: "Sold Out Believer"
- 1998: "He Ain't Heavy"
- 1999: "I Will Follow Christ" (with BeBe Winans and Bob Carlisle)
- 2000: "More Like You"
- 2001: "Arms of Jesus"
- 2001: "Sinner's Prayer"
- 2001: "No Fear"
- 2007: "Believe"

MArvie

== Awards ==
Clay Crosse has won four Dove Awards.

- 25th GMA Dove Awards – New Artist of the Year
- 1997 Dove Awards – Special Event Album of the Year, Tribute-The Songs of Andrae Crouch (compilation album won with CeCe Winans, Michael W. Smith, Twila Paris, Bryan Duncan, Wayne Watson, The Winans, Take 6, The Brooklyn Tabernacle Choir, First Call, Andrae Crouch and the All Star Choir; Norman Miller, Neal Joseph; Warner Alliance)
- 1998 Dove Awards – Special Event Album of the Year, God With Us: A Celebration of Christmas Carols & Classics (compilation won with Anointed, Michael W. Smith, Twila Paris, Sandi Patty, Steven Curtis Chapman, Chris Willis, Steve Green, Cheri Keaggy, Avalon, Out of the Grey, Ray Boltz, CeCe Winans, Larnelle Harris; Norman Miller; Sparrow)
- 2000 Dove Awards – Inspirational Recorded Song of the Year, "I Will Follow Christ"
