= JoyRide PH =

Transport and delivery service company in the Philippines

JoyRide
- Type: Private
- Industry: Transportation; Mobility as a service
- Founded: 2019
- Headquarters: Antipolo, Rizal, Philippines
- Key people: Sherwin Yu (President)
- Services: Taxi; Food delivery; Package delivery; Freight transport; Prepaid load
- Website: joyride.com.ph

We Move Things Philippines, Inc., doing business as JoyRide Philippines (JoyRide PH) is a Philippine transportation company that provides ride-hailing services, courier services, food delivery, and freight transport.

== History ==
JoyRide was established in 2019, at the time the Philippine government through the technical working group of the Land Transportation Franchising and Regulatory Board (LFTRB) was allowing Angkas to conduct pilot testing of the feasibility of motorcycle taxi-hailing as a means of public transportation. Along with Move It, JoyRide was given a greenlight to start its own operations from December 23. The company which is majority owned by the families of Filipinos Ralph Nubla Jr. and Bea Chua, have requested to join the pilot operations as early as September 2019.

Due to uncertainties of a future nationwide legal framework for motorcycle taxi hailing services in the Philippines, JoyRide announced that it will provide food delivery services. In March 2020, JoyRide launched its delivery service amidst the COVID-19 pandemic community quarantines.

Initially launched as a motorcycle taxi-hailing service, JoyRide has since expanded its offerings to include car rides, and other transportation solutions.

As of March 2024, JoyRide along with Angkas and Move It are being allowed to provide motorcycle taxi-hailing service as part of the government's pilot run of the transport scheme despite the lack of a legal framework.

== Services ==
Through the JoyRide Superapp, the business offers a variety of services, including motorcycle taxi rides, car-hailing services, delivery services, the Japan-inspired "Super Taxi" service, and more.

== Headquarters ==
The headquarters of JoyRide is located at the JoyRide PH Onboarding Facility, 80 Marcos Highway, Mayamot, Antipolo City.
