= Randy Thomas (musician) =

American Christian rock musician (born 1954)

- Born: November 15, 1954 (age 71)
- Origin: Denison, Texas, United States
- Genres: Contemporary Christian music
- Occupations: Songwriter, record producer
- Instrument: Guitar
- Label: Universal Records

Randy Thomas (born November 15, 1954) is an American Christian rock musician best known for being a member of the Sweet Comfort Band and Allies and co-writing "Butterfly Kisses".

Thomas performed with Sam Scott and Bob Carlisle in Psalm 150, then joined the Sweet Comfort Band in 1975. Sweet Comfort was the band's debut recording for Maranatha! Music in 1977. Switching to Light Records, Sweet Comfort Band produced five more records, the last titled Perfect Timing. A best-of compilation, Prime Time, followed.

In 1984 Thomas formed the band Allies with Scott and Carlisle. They spent nine years between 1984 and 1993 doing concerts and recording six albums. The band's debut was self-titled. The most successful Allies recording was Long way from Paradise with two No. 1 singles: "Devil Is a Liar" and "Take Me Back." During this period, Thomas and Carlisle became a well-known songwriting team. The first country song they penned was the 1989 Dolly Parton No. 1 song "Why'd You Come In Here Lookin' Like That?"

PolyGram Music, now Universal Music, signed Thomas as a staff writer in 1995. He wrote material for artists such as Bob Carlisle, Cliff Richard, Raybon Brothers, and Jeff Carson as well as for Dolly Parton, Hank Williams Jr., Highway 101, Collin Raye, Ty England, Lila McCann, and Engelbert Humperdinck.

Former Allies drummer Brian Fullen introduced Thomas to Robert John "Mutt" Lange and his wife, Shania Twain. Lange and Twain hired Thomas as a guitarist / vocalist for live international performances to debut the Mercury Records release The Woman In Me. Thomas performed some of the Woman In Me performances throughout 1995 and 1996 which also featured former RCA recording artist/guitarist/songwriter Dan Schafer.

Thomas also played with Canadian artist Paul Brandt, and later SHeDAISY.

He shared the 1997 Grammy Award for Best Country Song with Bob Carlisle for writing the song "Butterfly Kisses". "Butterfly Kisses" sold over three million units and was awarded a Platinum Single Award.

Thomas was producer, co-writer and co-artist on Identical Strangers (Damascus Road Records) with Andy Denton in 1996. Identical Strangers was a critically acclaimed CD yielding two top-5 singles. Thomas retired in 1997, coming out of retirement in 2007.

His various awards include: Grammy, Dove, ASCAP, NSAI, and Nashville Music awards. Thomas and his wife, Lori currently reside in Signal Mountain, Tennessee. They have three children, all of whom Randy has co-written songs for: Crystal ("Butterfly Kisses"), Randall ("A Father's Love"), and Sarah ("I Wish I Could").

== Awards and nominations ==
Year	Association	Category	Result
1998	40th Grammy Awards	Best Country Song - "Butterfly Kisses"	Won
1998	Dove Awards of 1998	Southern Gospel Recorded Song of the Year - "Butterfly Kisses"	Won
