= Cheri Keaggy =

American singer and songwriter

- Born: Cheri Louise Anderson
- Origin: Nashville, Tennessee
- Genres: Worship, CCM
- Occupation(s): Singer, songwriter
- Instrument(s): vocals, singer-songwriter
- Years active: 1994–present
- Website: cherikeaggy.com

Cheri Louise Keaggy (née Anderson) is a gospel singer and songwriter, with a musical style of Contemporary Christian music. She is now divorced from her high school sweetheart Eddie Keaggy, the nephew of the CCM pioneer artist, Phil Keaggy.

She was discovered by Charlie Peacock when Eddie, a sound engineer, did a concert for him. Peacock produced her first two albums, Child of the Father, and My Faith Will Stay.

== Discography ==
=== Solo ===
- 1994: Child of the Father
- 1996: My Faith Will Stay
- 1997: What Matters Most
- 2001: Let's Fly
- 2007: Because He First Loved Us
- 2012: So I Can Tell
- 2015: No Longer My Own
- 2022: What I Know To Be True

Other Albums

- 1999: There Is Joy in the Lord: The Worship Songs of Cheri Keaggy
- 2006: Very Best of Cheri Keaggy

=== With others ===
- God With Us (Christmas) (1997)
- Let Us Pray (National Day of Prayer) (1997)
- Keep the Faith 2000: Overcoming Stress & Anxiety (1998)
- If My People Pray (1999)
- Revival Generation: Lovely Noise (1999)
- Songs 4 Life: Strengthen Your Faith (1999)
- Women of Faith: Overwhelming Joy (1999)
- All We Faithful (Christmas) (2000)
- I Will Be Here (wedding songs) (2002)]

== Songs ==
- "Not With Jesus"
- "My Faith Will Stay"
- "Sweet Peace of God"
- "In Remembrance of Me"
- "You, Oh Lord, Are My Refuge"
- "Little Boy on His Knees"
- "Lay It Down"
- "There Is Joy in the Lord"
- "What Matters Most"

== Awards ==
Dove Award Nominations:

- 1995 New Artist of the Year
- 1997 Inspirational Album of the Year for My Faith Will Stay
- 1999 Praise & Worship Album of the Year for There Is Joy in the Lord

Dove Award Winner: 1998 Special Event Album of the Year for her contribution to God With Us
