= Butterfly Kisses (song) =

1997 single by Bob Carlisle

Single by Bob Carlisle

from the album Butterfly Kisses (Shades of Grace)
- B-side: "Shades of Grace"
- Released: April 1997
- Length: 5:38, 5:41-Country Version
- Label: Diadem/Jive
- Songwriters: Bob Carlisle; Randy Thomas
- Producer: Larry Day

Bob Carlisle singles chronology
"Mighty Love" (1996)	"Butterfly Kisses" (1997)	"That Wonderful Someone" (1999)

"Butterfly Kisses" is a song written by Bob Carlisle and Randy Thomas from Carlisle's third studio album, Butterfly Kisses (Shades of Grace). The song was written for Carlisle's daughter Brooke's 16th birthday. Carlisle also wrote a journal, Butterfly Kisses for Fathers and Their Daughters. The last track of Butterfly Kisses (Shades Of Grace) is a country version of the song, where instruments like the pedal steel guitar and fiddle are added. There have been many cover versions of the song including Raybon Brothers, Jeff Carson, Westlife and Cliff Richard.

== Chart performance ==
Carlisle's rendition of the song became a major radio hit in United States, reaching the top 10 of Hot 100 Airplay and becoming a number-one single on the Adult Contemporary chart. The song also received a Dove Award for Song of the Year, as well as a Grammy Award for Best Country Song. It is also Carlisle's only chart single.

=== Weekly charts ===
Chart (1997)	Peak position
Canada Adult Contemporary (RPM)	1
Canada Country Singles (RPM)	52
Canada Top Singles (RPM)	25
Ireland (IRMA)	14
Netherlands (Dutch Top 40)	15
Netherlands (Single Top 100)	16
US Adult Contemporary (Billboard)	1
US Adult Pop Airplay (Billboard)	13
US Hot Country Songs (Billboard)	45
US Pop Airplay (Billboard)	16
US Rhythmic Airplay (Billboard)	38
US Radio Songs (Billboard)	10

=== Year-end charts ===
Chart (1997)	Position
Canada Adult Contemporary Tracks (RPM)	14
Netherlands (Dutch Top 40)	73
Netherlands (Single Top 100)	58
US Adult Contemporary (Billboard)	15

== Raybon Brothers version ==
"Butterfly Kisses"

Single by Raybon Brothers

from the album Raybon Brothers
- Released: May 13, 1997
- Recorded: May 12, 1997
- Genre: Country
- Length: 4:44
- Label: MCA
- Songwriters: Bob Carlisle; Randy Thomas
- Producers: Don Cook, Tony Brown

Raybon Brothers singles chronology
"Butterfly Kisses" (1997)	"The Way She's Looking" (1997)

The same year that Carlisle's version was released, two country music artists each recorded covers of the song. These covers would overlap with his version, which was also a minor hit on the country charts. The higher-peaking cover was issued by the Raybon Brothers, a duo composed of Marty Raybon (former lead singer of Shenandoah) and his brother Tim. The Raybon Brothers' version was a number 37 country and number 22 Hot 100 hit in 1997. The single was released by Rick Hendrix Company to Christian radio and moved into the Top 40. One of three singles for the duo, it was also the title track to the Raybon Brothers' 1997 MCA Records debut album. The Raybon Brothers' rendition received RIAA gold certification.

=== Chart performance ===
Chart (1997)	Peak position
Canada Country Singles (RPM)	36
US Billboard Hot 100	22
US Country Songs (Billboard)	37

== Jeff Carson version ==
"Butterfly Kisses"

Single by Jeff Carson

from the album Butterfly Kisses
- Released: June 17, 1997
- Genre: Country
- Length: 3:55
- Label: Curb
- Songwriters: Bob Carlisle; Randy Thomas
- Producer: Chuck Howard

Jeff Carson singles chronology
"Do It Again" (1997)	"Butterfly Kisses" (1997)	"Here's the Deal" (1997)

Jeff Carson also recorded his own version on his second album for Curb Records, which was also titled Butterfly Kisses. Carson's version peaked at number 63 on the country music charts. The album also featured an alternate version of the song, which contained elements from Kippi Brannon's then-current single "Daddy's Little Girl".

=== Chart performance ===
Chart (1997)	Peak position
US Bubbling Under Hot 100 (Billboard)	3
US Hot Country Songs (Billboard)	66

== Other versions ==
There are other versions recorded including:

- Westlife's version on their The Love Album's Asian Deluxe Edition (The main British album release however does not include the song)
- Cliff Richard's version was originally released on his 1998 (UK) studio album Real as I Wanna Be. It was later included on his US compilation album Healing Love (Songs of Inspiration) An official music video has also been released. On April 18, 2014, Richard released a new version as a single in Germany titled "Schmetterlings-Küsse", sung entirely in German.
- American R&B singer, and winner of The Voice season two, Jermaine Paul, recorded a version with a music video
