= Ray Boltz =

American singer-songwriter

- Born: June 14, 1953 (age 73); Muncie, Indiana, U.S.
- Genre: Contemporary Christian
- Occupations: Singer, songwriter
- Instruments: Vocals, piano, guitar
- Years active: 1986–2004, 2008–2023
- Website: RayBoltz.com

Raymond Howard Boltz (born June 14, 1953) is an American retired singer and songwriter who first came to notice in contemporary Christian music. Many of his songs tell stories of faith and inspiration.

== Background ==
Raised by his parents William and Ruth Boltz in Muncie, Indiana, Ray Boltz is the middle of three children. Boltz was married to Carol (née Brammer) Boltz for 33 years (1975–2008), and they have four children. Boltz graduated from Ball State University with a degree in business and marketing.

Boltz was unknown when he wrote "Thank You", which won the Song of the Year prize at the 1990 GMA Dove Awards. His song "I Pledge Allegiance to the Lamb" also won a Dove Award for Inspirational Recorded Song of the Year, at the 1995 GMA Dove Awards. Additionally, Boltz won a Dove Award for special event album of the year in 1998. After the release of Songs from the Potter's Field in 2002, and his last tour in 2004, Boltz retired from the music industry. He separated from his wife in 2005 before moving to Fort Lauderdale, Florida, with their divorce being finalized in early 2008.

Around Christmas of 2004, Ray Boltz came out as gay to his family. He didn't come out as gay publicly until September 12, 2008, during an interview with the Washington Blade. Since then, Boltz has performed at several churches of the Metropolitan Community Church, a gay-affirming Christian denomination.

In 2010, Boltz released the album True, which won Album of the Year at the OUTMusic Awards. Boltz lives in Fort Lauderdale, Florida, with his husband Franco Sperduti, who is also his talent agent.

== Discography ==
- 1986 Watch the Lamb
- 1988 Thank You
- 1989 The Altar
- 1991 Another Child to Hold
- 1992 Seasons Change
- 1994 Allegiance
- 1995 The Concert of a Lifetime (live, RIAA Gold)
- 1996 No Greater Sacrifice
- 1997 A Christmas Album: Bethlehem Star
- 1998 Honor and Glory
- 2000 The Classics
- 2001 Concert of a Lifetime for Kids [live]
- 2002 Songs from the Potter's Field
- 2004 The Unchanging Story
- 2010 True

=== Compilation albums ===
- 1994 Moments for the Heart (RIAA Gold Certified)
- 2001 Moments for the Heart, Vol. 1 & 2
- 2010 All The Best

=== Charts ===
Year	Album	Chart	Position
1995	The Concert of a Lifetime	Billboard 200	194
1996	No Greater Sacrifice	Billboard 200	173
1997	A Christmas Album: Bethlehem Star	Billboard 200	169
