= Bryan Duncan =

American musician

- Born: March 16, 1953 (age 73); Ogden, Utah, U.S.
- Genres: Singer/Songwriter (Contemporary Christian music)
- Instruments: Vocals, keyboards
- Years active: 1973–present
- Labels: Light Records, Modern Art Records, Myrrh Records, Epic Records, Benson Records/Diadem Music Group, Provident Music, Sony Music, Red Road Records
- Website: www.bryanduncan.com, www.nutshellsermons.com

Bryan Edward Duncan (born March 16, 1953) is an American contemporary Christian music artist. He is known for being the lead singer of the group Sweet Comfort Band and his band Bryan Duncan & the Nehosoul Band, but is best known for his very successful solo career where he was a major act on the Myrrh & Epic Record labels.

He is the founder of online recovery shows "Radio Rehab/ Road To Redemption" while continuing as a solo artist with the 2019 Shine release. He has received four Dove Awards and has been nominated six times for male vocalist of the year. He is also a winner of a Grammy Award for his Andraé Crouch tribute, as well as receiving multiple Grammy nominations. Bryan is also the host of the popular podcast "Nutshell Sermons".

== Career ==
Duncan started his career in 1973 with the Jesus music band Sweet Comfort Band which later transitioned to contemporary Christian music. After the band broke up in 1984 Duncan started his solo career. During this time, Duncan released several number-one songs including "Traces of Heaven", "Things are Gonna Change", "United We Stand" and "Don't Look Away" from the Slow Revival album; "Love Takes Time", "You Don't Leave Me Lonely", "Into My Heart", "When It Comes to Love" and "I'll Not Forget You" from the Mercy album; and "A Heart Like Mine" from the compilation My Utmost for His Highest.

In 2003, Duncan formed the Nehosoul Band with Ricky B. Rogers (bass player, music director, co-writer), composer and keyboardist Phil Curry, guitarist Walter Finch, and drummer Sam Matthews. The band released the album Music City Live in 2004, A Nehosoul Christmas in 2005, and Still Dancin' in 2008. In 2013, Bryan reunited with the Sweet Comfort Band. In April 2013, the Sweet Comfort Band released the album, The Waiting is Over.

Duncan has sold more than 1 million records, released 18 solo albums, and appeared on several compilation projects. He has released three solo video projects, a joint tour video, and has done the video for Left Behind: The Movie. Duncan has also started a record label called Red Road Records.

Duncan created a non-profit online radio show and podcast entitled "Radio Rehab" to encourage people in daily life. He released two books in 2010: Hog Wash, a book for bikers, and Dear God...Really? (prayers you won't hear in church) and Spoke To God...He Said (5-second devotions).

Duncan, Rogers, and Vail Johnson (of the Kenny G band) wrote together for Conversations, Duncan's first solo project since 2000's Joyride. It was released in 2012 on Red Road Records, followed by Conversations with 'Bryan Duncan and Friends Live Experience, and Shine.

2022 began a podcast called Nutshell Sermons, (from your friend on the back row).

== Personal life ==
Duncan attended Southeastern University in Lakeland, Florida. He also attended Vanguard University in Costa Mesa, California.

== Discography ==
=== With Sweet Comfort Band ===
- 1977: Sweet Comfort (Maranatha! Records)
- 1979: Breaking the Ice (Light Records)
- 1980: Hold on Tight (Light Records)
- 1981: Hearts of Fire (Light Records)
- 1982: Cutting Edge (Light Records)
- 1984: Perfect Timing (Light Records)
- 2013: The Waiting Is Over (Shelter Sound Music, Inc.)

=== Solo ===
- 1985: Have Yourself Committed
- 1986: Holy Rollin'
- 1987: Whistlin' In the Dark
- 1989: Strong Medicine
- 1990: Anonymous Confessions of a Lunatic Friend
- 1992: Mercy
- 1994: Slow Revival
- 1995: Unidos En El
- 1995: The Light Years
- 1995: Christmas Is Jesus
- 1995: My Utmost for His Highest
- 1996: Blue Skies
- 1998: The Last Time I Was Here
- 1999: Love Takes Time
- 2000: Joyride
- 2013: Conversations
- 2014: The Ultimate Collection
- 2016: Bryan Duncan & Friends - The Live Experience
- 2019: Shine

== Awards ==
=== Grammy Awards ===
- 1996: Best Pop/Contemporary Gospel Album for Tribute – The Songs of Andrae Crouch (various artists)

=== GMA Dove Awards ===
- 1996: Special Event Album of the Year for My Utmost for His Highest (various artists)
- 1997: Inspirational Album of the Year for Quiet Prayers (My Utmost for His Highest)
- 1997: Special Event Album of the Year for Tribute – The Songs of Andrae Crouch (various artists)
- 1999: Long Form Music Video of the Year for My Utmost for His Highest – The Concert (various artists)
