= Bob Carlisle =

American contemporary Christian singer and songwriter (born 1956)

- Born: September 29, 1956 (age 70)
- Origin: Santa Ana, California, U.S.
- Genres: Contemporary Christian, pop
- Occupations: Singer, songwriter
- Instrument: Vocals
- Years active: 1985–present
- Labels: Sparrow, Diadem Music

Robert Mason Carlisle (born September 29, 1956) is an American contemporary Christian singer and songwriter. He performed with several bands, most notably Allies and Billy Thermal, before launching a solo career where he received a Grammy Award and four Dove Awards.

== Career ==
Carlisle is best known for his hit song "Butterfly Kisses", which appeared on his third solo album. That album, originally titled Shades of Grace, was later re-released as Butterfly Kisses (Shades of Grace), because of the success of the single. He co-wrote this song with his songwriting partner from Allies, Randy Thomas, and for this, they won the 1997 Grammy Award for Best Country Song and three Dove Awards, including Song of the Year. This song was also a country chart single that same year for Jeff Carson and the Raybon Brothers. After "Butterfly Kisses," Carlisle continued to record for movie soundtracks and with other artists, but could not match the success of his surprise hit.

== Discography ==
=== With Allies ===
See: Allies discography

=== Solo albums ===
Title	Album details	Peak chart positions								Certifications (sales threshold)
Title	Album details	US CHR	US	US Heat	CAN	CAN Country	AUS	NL	NZ	Certifications (sales threshold)
Bob Carlisle	Release date: June 15, 1993; Label: Sparrow Records; Formats: CD, cassette	16	—	—	—	—	—	—	—	
The Hope of a Man	Release date: November 15, 1994; Label: Sparrow Records; Formats: CD, cassette	—	—	—	—	—	—	—	—	
Butterfly Kisses (Shades of Grace)	Release date: May 13, 1997; Label: Diadem/Jive Records; Formats: CD, cassette	1	1	1	6	1	10	90	30	AUS: Gold; CAN: Platinum; US: 2× Platinum
Stories from the Heart	Release date: September 29, 1998; Label: Diadem/Benson Records; Formats: CD, cassette	7	191	—	—	—	—	—	—	
Nothing but the Truth	Release date: August 22, 2000; Label: Diadem Records; Formats: CD, cassette	—	—	—	—	—	—	—	—	
"—" denotes releases that did not chart

==== Compilations ====
Title	Album details	Peak position
Title	Album details	US CHR
Collection	Release date: July 29, 1997; Label: Chordant Music Group; Formats: CD, cassette	
The Ballads of Bob Carlisle	Release date: September 2, 1997; Label: Word/Epic; Formats: CD	
The Best of Bob Carlisle	Release date: May 21, 2002; Label: Diadem Records; Formats: CD	38
True Believer	Release date: December, 2005; Label: BMG; Formats: CD	

=== Singles ===
Year	Single	Peak chart positions										Album
Year	Single	US Christian CHR	US Country	US AC	US Adult	US Pop	CAN Country	CAN	CAN AC	IRL	NL	Album
1993	"Getting Stronger"	3	—	—	—	—	—	—	—	—	—	Bob Carlisle
1993	"Giving You the Rest of My Life"	1	—	—	—	—	—	—	—	—	—	Bob Carlisle
1994	"Mind, Body, Heart, and Soul"	7	—	—	—	—	—	—	—	—	—	Bob Carlisle
1994	"Bridge Between Two Hearts"	3	—	—	—	—	—	—	—	—	—	Bob Carlisle
1994	"Use Me"	13	—	—	—	—	—	—	—	—	—	Bob Carlisle
1995	"One Step Closer to Your Broken Heart"	4	—	—	—	—	—	—	—	—	—	The Hope of a Man
1995	"Walkin' Up the Steps of Faith"	18	—	—	—	—	—	—	—	—	—	The Hope of a Man
1996	"Mighty Love"	18	—	—	—	—	—	—	—	—	—	Butterfly Kisses (Shades of Grace)
1997	"Butterfly Kisses"	—	45	1	13	16	25	52	1	14	16	Butterfly Kisses (Shades of Grace)
1999	"That Wonderful Someone" (with Patsy Cline)	—	—	—	—	—	—	—	—	—	—	Patsy Cline Duets Vol. 1

=== Music videos ===
Year	Video	Director
1997	"Butterfly Kisses"	John Lloyd Miller
1998	"Father's Love"	John Lloyd Miller
2000	"We Fall Down"	

=== Appearances on other albums ===
- 1985: Have Yourself Committed Bryan Duncan; background vocals
- 1985: Manilow Barry Manilow; background vocals
- 1986: Holy Rollin' Bryan Duncan; background vocals
- 1986: One on One Steve Camp; background vocals
- 1987: Life as We Know It REO Speedwagon; background vocals
- 1987: Whistlin' In the Dark Bryan Duncan; background vocals
- 1988: The Reckoning Margaret Becker; background vocals
- 1989: On the Edge Soundtrack "God's Callin'" and a duet with Benny Hester "Playing Games"
- 1989: Strong Medicine Bryan Duncan; background vocals, guitar, arrangements
- 1991: Anonymous Confessions of a Lunatic Friend Bryan Duncan; background vocals
- 1992: A Friend Like U Geoff Moore & the Distance; background vocals
- 1992: Change Your World Michael W. Smith; background vocals ("Cross of Gold")
- 1993: Le Voyage Sandi Patty; background vocals
- 1993: Soul Margaret Becker
- 1993: Wake-Up Call Petra
- 1993: Tapestry Morning ("I Am Not My Own")
- 1994: Coram Deo II ("Jerusalem")
- 1994: Find It on the Wings Sandi Patty
- 1994: Promise Keepers: A Life That Shows
- 1994: Rebecca St. James Rebecca St. James; background vocals
- 1995: Do You Know This Man? Al Denson; background vocals
- 1995: Face of Mercy Dallas Holm; background vocals
- 1995: Field of Souls Wayne Watson; background vocals
- 1995: Petra Means Rock Petra; background vocals
- 1995: R.I.O.T. (Righteous Invasion of Truth) Carman
- 1995: The Lazarus Heart Randy Stonehill
- 1995: The Music of Christmas Steven Curtis Chapman
- 1996: Steel Witness The Charlie Daniels Band
- 1996: Tribute: The Songs of Andrae Crouch
- 1997: Blues Hat Charlie Daniels
- 1998: Jack Frost [Original Soundtrack] ("Father's Love")
- 1999: I Surrender All Clay Crosse ("I Will Follow Christ")
- 1999: Bridges [Original Soundtrack] ("Caravan of Love")
- 1999: Duets, Vol. 1 Patsy Cline ("That Wonderful Someone")
- 2000: Brand New Dream Danny Gans ("As Far as You Can See")
- 2000: Chicken Soup for Little Christian Souls: Songs to Build Your Christian Faith ("Jesus Loves Me")
- 2000: Left Behind [Original Soundtrack] ("After All (Rayford's Song)")
- 2000: Millennium Chorus: The Greatest Story Ever Sung ("Treasures in the Darkness")
- 2000: Child of the Promise ("Nothing Ever Happens to a Shepherd", "Shepherds Recitative")
- 2002: Left Behind 2: Adult Contemporary ("Rain")
- 2002: My Everything Helen Baylor ("Harambee")
- 2003: David: Ordinary Man...Extraordinary God ("Deliver Me (Psalm 59)")
- 2004: Creation: The Story of Life ("The Eden of My Heart")
- 2006: Charlotte's Web: Music Inspired by the Motion Picture ("Make a Wish")

== Awards and nominations ==
Year	Awards	Category	Result
1994	25th GMA Dove Awards	Praise & Worship Album of the Year – Coram Deo II (various artists)	Won
1997	28th GMA Dove Awards	Inspirational Recorded Song of the Year – "Butterfly Kisses"	Won
1997	28th GMA Dove Awards	Song of the Year – "Butterfly Kisses"	Won
1998	25th American Music Awards	Favorite Country New Artist	Nominated
1998	40th Grammy Awards	Best Country Song (songwriter) – "Butterfly Kisses"	Won
1998	29th GMA Dove Awards	Southern Gospel Recorded Song of the Year (songwriter) – "Butterfly Kisses"	Won
