= Greatest Hits (Kathy Troccoli album) =

2003 greatest hits album by Kathy Troccoli

Greatest hits album by Kathy Troccoli
- Released: July 1, 2003
- Genre: Contemporary Christian music
- Length: 63:55
- Label: Reunion

Kathy Troccoli chronology
The Heart of Me (2002)	Greatest Hits (2003)	K.T.'s Groovin' Medleys (2004)

Greatest Hits is a compilation album by Kathy Troccoli, released on July 1, 2003, by Reunion Records. The album peaked at No. 39 on Billboard's Top Christian Albums chart on July 25, 2003.

== Critical reception ==
Professional ratings
Review scores
Source	Rating
AllMusic	4/5 stars

Aaron Latham of AllMusic writes, "this is a fine collection that should please fans as well as newcomers who are discovering the gifts of song and inspiration offered by Troccoli."

== Track listing ==
No.	Title	Writer(s)	Original album	Length
1.	"Holy, Holy"	Brown Bannister; Debbie Bannister; Michael W. Smith; Deborah Smith	New recording	5:24
2.	"Go Light Your World"	Chris Rice	Sounds of Heaven (1995)	4:04
3.	"Sounds of Heaven"	Kathy Troccoli; Bill Cuomo; Robert White Johnson	Sounds of Heaven	4:31
4.	"You're the Heart of Me"	Ty Lacy; Steve Siler; Sam Mizell	The Heart of Me (2002)	4:06
5.	"Stubborn Love"	Brown Bannister; Amy Grant; Michael W. Smith; Gary Chapman; Sloan Germann	New recording	4:31
6.	"Psalm Twenty-Three"	Kathy Troccoli; Nathan DiGesare	Corner of Eden (1998)	4:47
7.	"Help Myself to You"	Kathy Troccoli	Pure Attraction (1991)	4:08
8.	"Everything Changes"	Diane Warren	Pure Attraction	4:19
9.	"A Different Road"	Kathy Troccoli; Nathan DiGesare; Bruce Sudano	Corner of Eden	6:25
10.	"Mission of Love"	Kathy Troccoli; Christian James; Ray St. John; George McFarlane	Kathy Troccoli (1994)	4:28
11.	"I Will Choose Christ"	Kathy Troccoli; Tom Booth	Sounds of Heaven	4:24
12.	"Love Has a Name"	Kathy Troccoli; Tom Booth	Love Has a Name (2000)	4:19
13.	"I Call Him Love"	Joanna Carlson; Ty Lacy; Kevin Stokes	Love & Mercy (1997)	3:58
14.	"My Life Is in Your Hands"	Kathy Troccoli; Bill Montvilo	Kathy Troccoli	4:31
Total length:				63:55

Track information and credits adapted from the album's liner notes.

== Credits and personnel ==
Credits adapted from Tidal.

Musicians

- Kathy Troccoli – lead vocals
- David Cleveland – acoustic guitar (1, 5)
- Gordon Kennedy – electric guitar (1)
- Michael Mellett – vocal arrangement (1), background vocals (1, 5)
- Fiona Mellett – background vocals (1)
- Leanne Albrecht – background vocals (1)
- Nirva Dorsaint – background vocals (1)
- LeAnne Palmore – background vocals (1)
- Jerard Woods – background vocals (1)
- Jovaun Woods – background vocals (1)

Production

- Michael Omartian – producer (10, 14)
- Ric Wake – producer (7, 8)
- Tony McAnany – producer (12)
- Christopher Harris – producer (4)
- Nathan DiGesare – producer (6, 9)
- Rick Chudacoff – producer (2, 3, 11, 13)
- Peter Bunetta – producer (2, 3, 11, 13)
- Brown Bannister – producer (1, 5)
- Matt Baugher – executive producer
- Jason McArthur – A&R
- Lauri Melick – A&R production
- Michelle Bentrem – assistant (5)
- Steve Bishir – engineer, mixing (5)
- Traci Sterling Bishir – production coordination (5)
- Stephanie McBrayer – art direction
- Hank Nirider – assistant, digital editing (5)
- Blair Masters – programming
- Bernie Herms – programming (5)
- Russ Harrington – photography
- Rusty Mitchell – graphic design

== Charts ==
Chart (2003)	Peak position
US Christian Albums (Billboard)	39
