= Sounds of Heaven =

Studio album by Kathy Troccoli
- Released: September 26, 1995
- Studios: Sound Stage Studios, Quad Studios, The Dugout, Downstage Studios, The Battery Studio and OmniSound Studios (Nashville, Tennessee); Dickerson Studio and Cornerstone Studios (Chatsworth, California); Le Dump Digital (North Hollywood, California); The Studio in Orange (Orange, California)
- Genres: CCM, Christian pop, inspirational
- Length: 40:35
- Label: Reunion
- Producers: Brown Bannister; Peter Bunetta; Rick Chudacoff

Kathy Troccoli chronology
Kathy Troccoli (1994)	Sounds of Heaven (1995)	Love & Mercy (1997)

Sounds of Heaven is the sixth studio album by Christian singer-songwriter Kathy Troccoli. It was released on September 26, 1995, on Reunion Records. After the limited mainstream success of her two previous albums Pure Attraction (1991) and the self-titled 1994 release, Troccoli returns with her first full-length Christian album since 1986's Images. American singer-songwriter Chris Rice has penned three songs on Sounds of Heaven including the lead single "Go Light Your World." The song was nominated for Pop/Contemporary Song of the Year, in addition to Troccoli's nomination for Female Vocalist of the Year at the 26th GMA Dove Awards. The album peaked at number 10 on the Top Christian Albums and number 17 on the Heatseekers charts in Billboard magazine.

== Track listing ==
1. "I Will Choose Christ" (Kathy Troccoli, Tom Booth) - 4:27
2. "That's How Much I Love You" (Dawn Thomas) - 2:53
3. "Go Light Your World" (Chris Rice) - 4:07
4. "Sounds of Heaven" (Troccoli, Bill Cuomo, Robert White Johnson) - 4:34
5. "Hallelujahs" (Rice) - 3:50
6. "I'm Gonna Fight for You" (Troccoli, Cuumo, Johnson) - 3:54
7. "Each Moment" (Troccoli, Bill Montvilo) - 4:25
8. "Fill My Heart" (Troccoli, Montvilo) - 3:57
9. "May I Be His Love" (Troccoli, Madeline Stone) - 4:00
10. "Missing You" (Rice) - 4:28

== Personnel ==
- Kathy Troccoli – lead vocals
- Brad Cole – keyboards (1, 9), programming (1, 9)
- Mark T. Jordan – keyboards (2)
- Michael Eckart – keyboards (3, 4, 6, 8), programming (3, 4, 6, 8)
- Dane Noel – keyboards (3, 4, 6, 8), programming (3, 4, 6, 8)
- Shane Keister – acoustic piano (5), electric piano (10)
- Brian D. Siewart – keyboards (5, 7, 10), orchestrations (5), percussion (7, 10), acoustic piano (10)
- Frank Reina – additional keyboards (8)
- Dann Huff – guitars (1), acoustic guitar (2), electric guitar (3, 4, 6)
- Richard Bredice – acoustic guitar (3, 4, 6)
- Gordon Kennedy – guitars (7, 10)
- Jerry McPherson – guitars (7, 10)
- Mike Brignardello – bass (7)
- Jimmie Lee Sloas – bass (10)
- Peter Bunetta – drums (4, 6)
- Chris McHugh – drums (7, 10)
- Tabitha Fair – backing vocals (1, 3, 4, 6, 8)
- Jackie Farris – backing vocals (1, 3)
- Ellis Hall – backing vocals (1, 3, 4)
- Kim Keyes – backing vocals (1, 3, 4, 6, 8)
- Maxayn Lewis – backing vocals (1, 3)
- Stella Payton – backing vocals (1, 3)
- Carol Perry – backing vocals (1, 3)
- Micah Wilshire – backing vocals (1, 3, 4, 6, 8, 10)
- Syreeta Wright – backing vocals (1, 3)
- Lisa Cochran – backing vocals (5, 7)
- Michael Mellett – backing vocals (5, 7, 10)
- Cindy Morgan – backing vocals (5, 7)
- Rick Kittleman – backing vocals (10)

Production

- Don Donahue – A&R
- Brown Bannister – producer
- Peter Bunetta – producer
- Rick Chudacoff – producer
- Steve Bishir – recording, mixing
- Eric Rudd – recording
- Eric Sarafin – mixing
- Martin Woodlee – recording assistant, additional engineer
- Leon Johnson – additional recording
- James "JB" Baird – additional engineer
- Eric Greedy – mix assistant
- Aaron Swihart – mix assistant
- Dave Collins – mastering at A&M Mastering Studios (Hollywood, California)
- Traci Sterling Bishir – production coordinator
- Rob Birkhead – art direction
- Karrine Caulkins – design
- Buddy Jackson – design
- Russ Harrington – photography
- Cindy Dupree – management

== Critical reception ==
Professional ratings
Review scores
Source	Rating
AllMusic	3/5 stars
Cross Rhythms	8/10 stars

Dacia A. Blodgett-Williams of AllMusic wrote that Troccoli "gives a nice balance between soft pop ballads and up-tempo pieces on this inspirational release. The first of ten tracks opens on an upbeat tempo with 'I Will Choose Christ' and the pace rarely lets up, even through the ballads. The title track, which is placed in the fourth position, is also a lively song. The seventh track, 'Each Moment' is a ballad with a melody that catches and requires full attention, while the eighth track is a dance worthy piece appropriately titled 'Fill My Heart.' Lots of old-fashioned gospel feel on this album even though the music is more accurately described as inspirational pop."

Tony Cummings of Cross Rhythms rated Sounds of Heaven 8 out of 10 saying that the album is "the most Christ-o-centric and with subdued production work from Peter Bunetto, Rick Chudacoff and Brown Bannister emanates a worshipful mood. Even obvious 'We Are The World'-style anthems like 'Go Light The World' are, by the standards of such material, arranged with taste while the simply arranged self-composed 'I Will Choose Christ' opener is as tenderly moving a worship ballad as you're likely to hear. Not that everything is laid back balladry, the title track features a catchy pop groove while the chunky 'Fill My Heart' has a solid backbeat."

== Charts ==
Chart (1995)	Peak position
US Top Christian Albums (Billboard)	10
US Top Heatseekers Albums (Billboard)	17

=== Radio singles ===
Year	Singles	Peak positions	
Year	Singles	CCM AC	CCM CHR
1995	"Go Light Your World"	1	—
1996	"Sounds of Heaven"	2	4
1996	"I Will Choose Christ"	4	—
1996	"Fill My Heart"	1	11
1996	"Hallelujahs"	17	—
