= These Days (Sandi Patty album) =

Studio album by Sandi Patty
- Released: November 14, 2000
- Genre: CCM, inspirational music, Christian pop
- Length: 49:30
- Label: Word
- Producer: Greg Nelson, Brent Bourgeois, Phil Naish, Hal S. Batt

Sandi Patty chronology
Together (1999)	These Days (2000)	All the Best...Live! (2001)

These Days is the twentieth studio album by Christian singer Sandi Patty. It was released on November 14, 2000, on Word Records. It is Patty's first new studio album of Christian material since 1997's Artist of My Soul and a return to her Christian AC/Pop sound reminiscent of Find It on the Wings and Le Voyage with songwriting contributions from Kathy Troccoli, Cindy Morgan, Scott Krippayne and Chris Eaton. Long-time producer Greg Nelson produces three tracks including a cover of Michael and Stormie Omartian's "One More Song for You," originally recorded by The Imperials. Production duties also handled by Brent Bourgeois, Phil Naish and Hal S. Batt on the Spanglish duet "Solo El Amor (Only Love)" with Latin singer Miguel Angel Guerra.

== Critical reception ==
Professional ratings
Review scores
Source	Rating
AllMusic	4/5 stars
Cross Rhythms	9/10

Charlotte Dillon of AllMusic gave These Days 4 out of 5 stars saying that the album "is filled with a Christian pop beat and strong, inspirational lyrics. Of course, her voice is beautiful enough to almost gloss over bad songs, but that's not needed here. Fans probably won't find a single track on this album that they care to skip. These songs are quality offerings from production to writing to music. The Christian messages in the tunes on 'These Days' touch hearts without knocking listeners over the head. It makes it easy to see why Patty performs before sold-out crowds so often and has been called on to entertain smaller audiences at places like the White House." Dillon also said about the "standout songs on this album are 'Wings of Peace,' 'In the Calm,' 'Go Without Knowing,' 'Candles' and 'Wouldn't Trade It for the World.'"

Geoff Howlett of Cross Rhythms also praised the album saying "'These Days' is her first studio album release for three years and what a comeback it is. There are so many good songs but, for me, the pick has to be 'Solo El Amor' (Only Love). Dueting with Latin singing sensation Miguel Angel Guerra, it's a tremendous song that tells of the time when God impacts the life of a person and makes them perfectly whole. 'All This Time' was co-written by Sandi and her friend Cindy Morgan as a touching tribute to her daughter, with her vocals caressing each word as only a mother speaking to her child can. It's an album that will appeal to a wide age range because, although pop orientated, there's plenty of different styles contained within."

== Track listing ==
No.	Title	Writer(s)	Producer(s)	Length
1.	"Wouldn't Trade It for the World"	Eric Laughlin, Lori Lyon Kitts	Phil Naish	4:39
2.	"Go Without Knowing"	Lowell Alexander, Kevin Stokes	P. Naish	4:26
3.	"Solo El Amor (Only Love)" (duet with Miguel Angel Guerra)	Donato Póveda, Kelly Minter	Hal S. Batt	4:29
4.	"Shine"	Kathy Troccoli, Jeff Franzel, Rick Witkowski	Brent Bourgeois	4:30
5.	"Wings of Peace"	Chris Eaton, Chris Rodriguez	B. Bourgeios	4:32
6.	"Once and for All"	Eddie DeGarmo, Bob Farrell	P. Naish	4:40
7.	"All This Time (Anna's Song)"	Sandy Patty, Cindy Morgan, Jeff Lippencott	B. Bourgeios	4:21
8.	"Candles"	Bo Cooper, Ty Lacy	P. Naish	4:38
9.	"One More Song for You"	Michael and Stormie Omartian	Greg Nelson	4:41
10.	"These Are the Days"	J. Lippencott, Matt Huesmann	G. Nelson	4:45
11.	"In the Calm"	Scott Krippayne, Tony Wood	G. Nelson	3:49
