= Go Light Your World =

"Go Light Your World" is a song written by Chris Rice. It was a chart hit for him as well as a chart hit for Kathy Troccoli.

== Overview ==
The song was composed by Chris Rice. The first version was recorded by Kathy Troccoli. The purpose of the song is for Christians to shine their light to others. The song ended up being a frequent song sung at missions events and evangelism conferences.

Musician Fletch Wiley also recorded a version of the song.

== Kathy Troccoli version ==
"Go Light Your World"

CD single by Kathy Troccoli

from the album Sounds of Heaven
- Released: 1995
- Length: 4:06
- Label: Reunion Records RECD-2902
- Composer: Chris Rice

Kathy Troccoli singles chronology
"Never My Love" (1995)	"Go Light Your World" (1995)	"Love One Another" (1995)

=== Background ===
"Go Light Your World" was recorded by Kathy Troccoli and released on CD single, Reunion Records RECD-2902 in 1995. It appears on her Sounds of Heaven album. The song also appears on her 30 Years/Songs: The Kathy Troccoli Collection compilation album.

On Sunday night, 19 May 1996, Troccoli performed to 1000 teenagers outside Cleveland. When she performed "Go Light Your World", the people in the audience held up the snap-and-glow sticks they had brought with them. The effect was described as amaziing.

Because of the song, Troccoli has been described as the "Go Light Up Your World singer".

=== Reception ===
In the 1 December 1995 issue of Network, Troccoli's song was one of the three songs that female artists were said to be coming along with a full force.

=== Airplay ===
For the week of 8 December 1995, "Go Light Your World" debuted on the Gavin A/C Up & Coming chart. It had 22 reports, 17 adds, 248 spins and +181 trends. For the week of 15 December, the song had 42 reports, 21 adds, 496 spins and +248 trends. The song also made the Gavin SPINcreases chart that week with an increase of 248 spins. For the week of 12 January 1996, back on the A/C Up and Coming chart, the song had 54 reports, 9 adds, 747 spins and +235 trends. For the week of 19 January, the song had 54 reports, 2 adds 777 spins and +30 trends. The song had was not on the chart for the week of 2 February.

== Chris Rice version ==
"Go Light Your World"

Song by Chris Rice

from the album Short Term Memories
- Composer: Chris Rice
- Producer: Monroe Jones

=== Background ===
The song appears on Chris Rice's Short Term Memories album that was released in 2004.

=== Reception ===
The album was given four and a half stars by Jesus Freak Hideout. The song was described as a slow piano ballad about letting Jesus light up your life. The reviewer also wrote that Rice did wonderful job with his version.

=== Charts ===
Rice's version debuted on the Billboard Hot Christian Songs chart for the week of 26 June 2004. Spending sixteen weeks on the chart, it peaked at No. 23 for the week of 26 August.
