= Love Has a Name =

Love Has a Name may refer to:

- Love Has a Name (Jesus Culture album), 2017
- Love Has a Name (Kathy Troccoli album), 2000
