= WOW 2000 =

Compilation album by Various artists
- Released: October 26, 1999
- Genre: Contemporary Christian music
- Label: Sparrow, EMI Christian Music Group
- Producer: Various

WOW compilation albums chronology
WOW 1999 (1998)	WOW 2000 (1999)	WOW Hits 2001 (2000)

Professional ratings
Review scores
Source	Rating
AllMusic	4/5 stars

WOW 2000 is a compilation album of 30 contemporary Christian music hits and four bonus tracks that was released on October 26, 1999. The album hit No. 29 on the Billboard 200 chart in 1999, and No. 1 on the Top Contemporary Christian chart in both 1999 and 2000. It was certified as double platinum in the US in 2000 by the Recording Industry Association of America (RIAA). The album was certified as gold in Canada in 2001 by the Canadian Recording Industry Association (CRIA).

== Track listing ==
=== Purple disc ===
1. "Gravity" – Delirious?
2. "No One Loves Me Like You" – Jars of Clay (Note: Mistakenly titled "Nobody Loves Me Like You" on CD liner notes)
3. "Love Liberty Disco" – Newsboys
4. "Consume Me" – dc Talk
5. "I've Always Loved You" – Third Day
6. "Thankful" – Caedmon's Call
7. "A Little More" – Jennifer Knapp
8. "Get Down" – Audio Adrenaline
9. "I Want to Know You (In The Secret)" – Sonicflood
10. "River" – Out of Eden
11. "Basic Instructions" – Burlap To Cashmere
12. "Away From You" – The O.C. Supertones
13. "Stranded" – Plumb
14. "The Rumor Weed Song" – The W's
15. "Always And Forever" – Raze
16. "New Way To Be Human" – Switchfoot
17. "Waiting Room" – LaRue

=== Silver disc ===
1. "Speechless" – Steven Curtis Chapman
2. "Takes a Little Time" – Amy Grant
3. "I Will Be Your Friend" – Michael W. Smith
4. "Show You Love" – Jaci Velasquez
5. "Can't Live A Day" – Avalon
6. "Breathe" – Sixpence None the Richer
7. "Saving Grace" – Point of Grace
8. "Run To You" – Twila Paris
9. "Revive Us" – Anointed
10. "It's Alright (Send Me)" – Winans Phase 2
11. "I Will Follow Christ" – Clay Crosse featuring BeBe Winans & Bob Carlisle
12. "One of These Days" – FFH
13. "Omega" (Radio Remix) – Rebecca St. James
14. "For The Glory of Your Name" – Michelle Tumes
15. "Cartoons" – Chris Rice
16. "I Am" – Jill Phillips
17. "Friend of Mine (Columbine)" – Jonathan & Stephen Cohen
