= Cartoon (disambiguation) =

A cartoon is any of several forms of visual art.

Cartoon or cartoons may also refer to:

== Arts, entertainment, and media ==
=== Music ===
==== Groups ====
- Cartoon, an Australian funk rock band
- Cartoon (band), an Estonian electro music band
- Cartoons (band), a Danish novelty band

==== Songs ====
- "Cartoon", a song by Soul Asylum from their 1988 album Hang Time
- "Cartoon", a song by Young Dro from his 2006 album Best Thang Smokin'
- "Cartoon", Paul Bley Trio
- "Cartoons" (Chris Rice song), 1989
- "Cartoons" (Cupcakke song), 2017
- "Cartoons", song by Franklyn Ajaye, 1976

=== Periodicals ===
- CARtoons Magazine, an American publication that focuses on automotive humor and hot rod artwork
- Cartoons Magazine, a defunct American publication that focused on newspaper editorial and political cartoons

=== Television ===
- Cartoon (TV series), German TV series (1967–1972)
- Cartoon Network, a US-based cable network, sometimes abbreviated to Cartoon
- "A Cartoon", an episode of The Ren & Stimpy Show
- "The Cartoon", an episode of Seinfeld

=== Other uses in arts, entertainment, and media ===
- Animated cartoon, a drawn film for TV, movies, or internet
- Modello, a preparatory study or model drawn in cardboard, typically as the base image for a tapestry

== Other uses ==
- Cartoon (typeface), 1936 typeface issued by Bauer Type Foundry

== See also ==
- Comic (disambiguation)
- Toon (disambiguation)
- Cars Toons, animated shorts by John Lasseter
- "Cartunes", animated shorts by Walter Lantz Productions
