= Kids Again =

Kids Again may refer to:

- "Kids Again" (Example song), 2014
- "Kids Again" (Sam Smith song), 2021
- "Kids Again", a 2007 song by Chris Rice from the album What a Heart Is Beating For
