= Stubborn Love =

Stubborn Love may refer to:

- Stubborn Love (song), a 2012 song by The Lumineers
- Stubborn Love (album), a 1982 album by Kathy Troccoli
- Stubborn Love, a song by Seaway, from the album Colour Blind
