= Heart and Soul (Kathy Troccoli album) =

Studio album by Kathy Troccoli
- Released: 1984
- Recorded: The Bennett House (Franklin, Tennessee) Bullet Recording, Hummingbird Studio and Tree Studios (Nashville, Tennessee) Mama Jo's Studios (North Hollywood, California)
- Genre: Christian, pop, synthpop
- Length: 38:15
- Label: Reunion, Word
- Producer: Brown Bannister

Kathy Troccoli chronology
Stubborn Love (1982)	Heart and Soul (1984)	Images (1986)

Professional ratings
Review scores
Source	Rating
Allmusic	3/5 stars

Heart and Soul is the second full-length studio album by singer-songwriter Kathy Troccoli. This album received a Grammy nomination in 1984, and contains songs written by Michael W. Smith. It featured music popular with CCM, as well as synthpop friendly songs, "I Belong to You" (based on the Heidelberg Catechism), "Holy Holy", and "Hearts of Fire". The album features the songwriting skills of Brown and Debbie Bannister, Amy Grant, Gary Chapman, Michael W. Smith, as well as others. The music is a blend of contemporary pop, synthpop, and gospel music. Heart and Soul climbed to the top 10 on the Billboard Top Christian Albums chart.

== Track listing ==
1. "Long Distance Letter" (Gary Chapman, Tim Marsh, Keith Thomas) – 3:13
2. "Yes and Know" (Chapman, Marsh, Thomas) – 3:55
3. "Bittersweetness" (Brown Bannister, Phil Madeira, Michael W. Smith) – 3:54
4. "Mighty Lord" (Madeira) – 5:02
5. "Open My Eyes" (Pam Mark Hall, M. Smith, Amy Grant) – 4:27
6. "Holy, Holy" (Deborah D. Smith, M. Smith, Brown and Debbie Bannister) – 5:01
7. "Hearts of Fire" (Billy Sprague, B. Bannister, M. Smith) – 4:00
8. "I Belong to You" (James Ward, Mark Gersmehl) – 4:16
9. "Island of Love" (Chris Eaton) – 3:54

== Charts ==
Chart (1984)	Peak position
US Top Christian Albums	10

=== Radio singles ===
Year	Singles	Peak positions
Year	Singles	CCM AC
1984	"I Belong to You"	3
1985	"Holy, Holy"	17

== Production ==
- Michael Blanton – executive producer, management
- Dan Harrell – executive producer, management
- Brown Bannister – producer
- Jack Joseph Puig – engineer, mixing
- Jim Baird – assistant engineer
- Don Cobb – assistant engineer
- Steve Ford – assistant engineer
- Mike Psanos – assistant engineer
- Doug Sax – mastering at The Mastering Lab (Hollywood, California)
- Kent Hunter and Thomas Ryan Studio – art direction, design
- Mark Tucker – photography

== Personnel ==
- Kathy Troccoli – vocals
- Keith Thomas – Prophet T8 (1, 6, 7), Yamaha DX7 (1, 6, 7), Rhodes electric piano (2, 5), Oberheim OB-8 (2, 7), synthesizers (9)
- Shane Keister – additional synthesizers (1–4, 7), acoustic piano (3, 4), synthesizers (5, 8, 9)
- Michael W. Smith – Prophet T8 (2, 3), Yamaha DX7 (2, 3), acoustic piano (5), Yamaha GS2 (6), Moog bass (7)
- Phil Madeira – Yamaha GS2 (4)
- Dann Huff – guitars (1–6, 8, 9), electric guitars (7)
- Mike Brignardello – bass guitar (1–6, 8, 9), bass solo (7)
- Paul Leim – drums
- Lenny Castro – percussion (1, 3, 5, 7, 9), congas (2)
- Ernie Watts – saxophone (1, 2)
- Terry McMillan – harmonica (4)
- Kathy Burdick – backing vocals (1, 8)
- Thom Flora – backing vocals (1, 6, 8)
- Gary Pigg – backing vocals (1, 6–8)
- Kim Fleming – backing vocals (2–6)
- Diana Hanna – backing vocals (2, 3, 5, 6)
- Donna McElroy – backing vocals (2–6)
- Chris Harris – backing vocals (4, 6, 7, 9)
- Doug Clements – backing vocals (6)
- Jackie Cusic – backing vocals (6, 7)
- Marty McCall – backing vocals (6)
- Judy Rodman – backing vocals (6)
- Melodie Tunney – backing vocals (6)
