= Libertad me das =

Studio album by Sandi Patty
- Released: 1998
- Studio: Casa de Javier, San Juan, Puerto Rico; Quality Recording Studio, San Juan, Puerto Rico; Gaither Studios, Alexandria, Virginia; Quad Studios, Nashville, Tennessee
- Genre: Inspirational music, latin music, gospel
- Length: 49:36
- Label: Word International
- Producer: Greg Nelson, Isaac Hernadez

Sandi Patty chronology
Artist of My Soul (1997)	Libertad me das (1998)	Together (1999)

Libertad me das (Spanish for "Freedom you give me") is a 1998 full-length Spanish language album by Christian singer Sandi Patty. The title song is also the Spanish version of her Artist of My Soul track "You Set Me Free." The album consists of some choice songs sung in Spanish from her Word catalog and is co-produced by Patty's long-time producer Greg Nelson with Spanish translation arrangements by Isaac Hernandez. Libertad me das won at the 30th GMA Dove Awards for Spanish Language Album of the Year in a tie along with Crystal Lewis' Oro (her Spanish language album version of Gold).

== Track listing ==
No.	Title	Writer(s)	Length
1.	"Su mano en mi hombro" (Hand on my Shoulder)	Greg Nelson, Bob Farrell	4:43
2.	"Quiero edificar" (Build My World Around You)	Grant Cunningham, Matt Huesmann	3:36
3.	"Otro tiempo, otro lugar" (Another Time, Another Place with Rene Gonzalez)	Gary Driskell	5:27
4.	"Obra en mi" (Carry On)	B. Farrell, Michael W. Smith	5:27
5.	"¿Quién ha de llamarle Rey?" (Who Will Call Him King of Kings?)	G. Nelson, B. Farrell, Sandi Patty	5:34
6.	"En las Alas del Amor" (Find It on the Wings)	B. Farrell, Tommy Sims	4:43
7.	"Libertad me das" (You Set Me Free)	Joel Lindsey	5:19
8.	"Amor en mil idiomas" (Love in Any Language)	Jon Mohr, John Mays	4:25
9.	"Via Dolorosa"	Billy Sprague, Niles Borop	4:36
10.	"Cuán grande es Él"	Stuart K. Hine	5:13

== Accolades ==
GMA Dove Awards

Year	Winner	Category
1999	Libertad me das (tie)	Spanish Language Album
