= Then Came the Night =

Studio album by Tommy Shane Steiner
- Released: April 9, 2002
- Genre: Country
- Length: 45:09
- Label: RCA Nashville
- Producer: Jimmy Ritchey

Singles from Then Came the Night
- 1. "What If She's an Angel" Released: December 3, 2001; 2. "Tell Me Where It Hurts" Released: 2002

Professional ratings
Review scores
Source	Rating
AllMusic	3/5 stars
Country Weekly	favorable

Then Came the Night is the only studio album by American country music artist Tommy Shane Steiner, released in 2002 on RCA Nashville. It features the single "What If She's an Angel", a number 2 hit for Steiner on the Hot Country Songs charts in late 2001-early 2002. Both the second and third singles — "Tell Me Where It Hurts" and "What We're Gonna Do About It", respectively — peaked at number 43 on the same chart.

The track "The Mind of John J. Blanchard" was later recorded by Anthony Smith under the title "John J. Blanchard" on his 2002 debut album If That Ain't Country, from which it was released as a single that year. "I Go Crazy" is a cover of pop singer Paul Davis's hit from 1978.

Jimmy Ritchey produced the album, with Frank Liddell serving as associate producer on tracks 2 and 5.

== Critical reception ==
Stephen Thomas Erlewine of AllMusic gave the album 3 stars out of 5, calling it "a mainstream pop album with a little bit of country dressing" and saying that Steiner is "a modest, likeable singer." Mark Marymont of Country Weekly praised "What If She's an Angel" as "sweetly sentimental", and saying that he "adds a new emotional dimension" to "I Go Crazy". Ray Waddell of Billboard gave the album a mostly-negative review, criticizing it as "devoid of substance" and calling the title track "pretentious", while calling "The Mind of John J. Blanchard" "well-written and even quite moving".

== Track listing ==
No.	Title	Writer(s)	Length
1.	"That Just Wouldn't Be Me"	Dan Colehour, Sam Tate, Annie Tate	3:31
2.	"Tell Me Where It Hurts"	Diane Warren	4:04
3.	"What If She's an Angel"	Bryan Wayne	3:35
4.	"Let Go"	Neil Thrasher, Michael Dulaney, Jimmy Olander	3:18
5.	"The Mind of John J. Blanchard"	Anthony Smith, Chris Wallin	3:55
6.	"What We're Gonna Do About It" (duet with Bridgette Wilson-Sampras)	Chris DuBois, Lee Thomas Miller	4:06
7.	"I Don't Need Another Reason" (duet with Randy Travis)	Brad Cotter, Connie Harrington	4:27
8.	"Havin' a Good Time" (background vocals: Richie McDonald)	Chris Lindsey, Aimee Mayo, Richie McDonald	4:03
9.	"I Go Crazy"	Paul Davis	3:56
10.	"And Yet"	Jimmy Ritchey, Tom Shapiro, Tommy Shane Steiner	4:20
11.	"Then Came the Night"	Chuck Jones, John Kilzer	5:54
Total length:			45:09

== Personnel ==
- Kenny Aronoff – drums
- Lisa Cochran – background vocals
- Eric Darken – percussion
- Chip Davis – background vocals
- Paul Franklin – pedal steel guitar, lap steel guitar
- Vince Gill – background vocals ("What If She's an Angel")
- David Grissom – electric guitar
- Aubrey Haynie – fiddle, mandolin
- Wes Hightower – background vocals
- David Huff – drum programming
- Paul Leim – drums
- B. James Lowry – acoustic guitar
- John Mabe – background vocals
- Liana Manis – background vocals
- Brent Mason – electric guitar
- Richie McDonald – background vocals ("Havin' a Good Time")
- Steve Nathan – keyboards
- Michael Rhodes – bass guitar
- Jimmy Ritchey – acoustic guitar, banjo, Dobro, harmonica, mandolin, electric guitar, 5-string banjo, nylon-string guitar
- Neil Thrasher – background vocals
- Lonnie Wilson – drums
- Curtis Wright – background vocals
- Jonathan Yudkin – violin, viola, cello

== Chart performance ==
Chart (2002)	Peak position
U.S. Billboard Top Country Albums	6
U.S. Billboard 200	71
