= Tommy Shane Steiner =

American singer

- Born: October 9, 1973 (age 53)
- Origin: Austin, Texas, United States
- Genre: Country
- Occupation: Singer
- Instrument: Vocals
- Years active: 2001–2002
- Label: RCA Nashville

Tommy Shane Steiner (born October 9, 1973) is an American country music artist. He made his debut in 2001 with the single "What If She's an Angel", which reached a peak of No. 2 on the Billboard Hot Country Singles & Tracks charts. It was the first of three chart singles from his singular album Then Came the Night, which was released in 2002 on RCA Records Nashville.

== Biography ==
Steiner was born in Austin, Texas to parents who were both rodeo entertainers. His main goal, however, was to become a country music artist. He began touring throughout the state of Texas, playing various clubs throughout the state. RCA Nashville signed Steiner in 2001, and his debut single, "What If She's an Angel", was released that year, followed by the album Then Came the Night. The single was added to the playlists of nearly 100 of the stations on Billboard's panel in one week. "What If She's an Angel" peaked at No. 2 on the Billboard U.S. Hot Country Singles & Tracks charts. Follow-up singles were less successful, however, and Steiner parted ways with RCA Nashville in December 2002. He has not recorded since.

After Steiner left RCA, he returned to the family cattle ranch in Austin. He sold the ranch to a developer and currently owns the Steiner Ranch Steakhouse. Though he occasionally performs in the restaurant, Steiner has no intention of returning to the music business.

== Discography ==
=== Studio albums ===
Title	Details	Peak chart positions	
Title	Details	US Country	US
Then Came the Night	Release date: April 9, 2002; Label: RCA Nashville	6	71

=== Singles ===
Year	Title	Peak chart positions		Album
Year	Title	US Country	US	Album
2001	"What If She's an Angel"	2	39	Then Came the Night
2002	"Tell Me Where It Hurts"	43	—	Then Came the Night
2002	"What We're Gonna Do About It" (with Bridgette Wilson)	43	—	Then Came the Night
"—" denotes releases that did not chart

=== Music videos ===
Year	Video	Director
2002	"What If She's an Angel"	Jim Yukich
