= Dee Brestin =

American Christian author

Dee Brestin is an American Christian author and speaker.

== Early life and education ==
Born in 1944, Brestin grew up in Wisconsin. She attended Northwestern University and Covenant Seminary.

Brestin grew up in a Christian home. She recalls having a spiritual experience with Jesus in 1966, soon after her older sister told her of having one with God. At the time, she and her husband Steve (d. 2004) were living in Indianapolis, Indiana, where he was studying to be a doctor. She has five children.

== Writing ==
In 1975, Brestin wrote Proverbs and Parables, a Bible study guide for the residents' wives group that she had started at her husband's medical school. It sold 120,000 copies. She then wrote six more study guides, including three with her husband, which covered marriage and parenting. She wrote her first book in 1984, Finders Keepers. After attending a week-long class at the School of Christian Writing, she was invited to submit a manuscript for an award. With encouragement from her editor, she did, and won. This led to her second book, The Friendships of Women, in 1988, which sold over 1 million copies.

She went on to write other books, which included Falling in Love with Jesus (2002, co-authored with Kathy Troccoli) and Idol Lies (2012). She has spoken at women's conferences and has been a frequent guest on Moody Radio and Focus on the Family.

== Selected bibliography ==
- Proverbs & Parables: God's Wisdom for Living study guide (1975)
- The Friendships of Women (1988)
- Falling in Love with Jesus (2002, co-authored with Kathy Troccoli)
- The God of All Comfort: Finding Your Way into His Arms by Dee Brestin. Zondervan. 2009.
- Idol Lies (2012)
- The God Who Surprises: Opening Our Eyes to His Presence in All of Life and Scripture. Multnomah. 2019. ISBN 978-0-7352-9180-5.
