= Love Stinks (film) =

- Promotional poster
- Directed by: Jeff Franklin
- Written by: Jeff Franklin
- Produced by: Adam J. Merims; Todd Hoffman
- Starring: French Stewart; Bridgette Wilson; Tyra Banks; Steve Hytner; Bill Bellamy
- Cinematography: Uta Briesewitz
- Edited by: Richard Candib
- Music by: Bennett Salvay
- Production company: Prophet Entertainment
- Distributed by: Independent Artists
- Release date: September 10, 1999
- Running time: 94 minutes
- Country: United States
- Language: English
- Budget: $4 million
- Box office: $2,924,635

Love Stinks is a 1999 American black comedy film written and directed by Jeff Franklin. The film stars French Stewart, Bridgette Wilson, Bill Bellamy and Tyra Banks.

Produced by Prophet Entertainment and distributed by Independent Artists, Love Stinks was released on September 10, 1999 to negative reviews from critics and was a box office bomb.

== Plot ==
Seth Winnick, a wealthy sitcom writer-producer with an Elvis fixation, meets Chelsea Turner, an interior decorator, at the wedding of their respective best friends, Larry and Holly Garnett. Despite Seth having brought another woman to the wedding as his date, he and Chelsea hit it off and leave the wedding together.

Acting on advice from Holly, Chelsea tells Seth she will not have sex with a man unless they've had at least three meals together. Seth speeds the two of them through several activities through the evening, including three meals. At the third, Chelsea offers to sleep with him, but first demands complete exclusivity. Seth is alarmed, but agrees and they have wild sex in the showroom of Chelsea's job.

Seth and Chelsea are initially happy together, but it quickly becomes clear that she is determined to marry him and wants their relationship to progress much faster than Seth is comfortable with. She tells him she loves him after only four weeks. When Seth doesn't immediately reciprocate, Chelsea explodes and nearly ends things. Desperate to stop her, Seth says he loves her.

When Chelsea's cat goes missing, she uses it as an excuse to move in with Seth, despite his clear misgivings. Days later, the cat inexplicably reappears.

On a Valentine's Day getaway, Chelsea believes Seth is about to propose, and is disappointed when he instead gives her jewelry. He tells her he believes it's too soon to get engaged, but Chelsea continues to push him, so Seth promises to propose in one year if things feel right.

Weeks later, Chelsea makes a scene at the filming of Seth's sitcom when she sees he has cast an attractive actress, Tawny, despite Chelsea previously asking him not to. Larry convinces Seth not to end the relationship and work things out with Chelsea.

Over the next year, Seth and Chelsea fight constantly, then reconcile with wild make-up sex. On Valentine's Day, Seth presents Chelsea with diamond earrings instead of a proposal and she responds furiously. Seth contends that since their relationship has been so tumultuous, he doesn't feel right about proposing. Chelsea throws a tantrum, ends their relationship and throws the earrings into the Pacific Ocean.

Seth feels relieved until Chelsea files a palimony lawsuit and vows to take both his house and half of what he owns. Seth's lawyer warns him that the lawsuit could cost him hundreds of thousands of dollars.

Chelsea moves back into Seth's house and terrorizes him by agitating his cat allergy by filling the place with rescue cats and replacing his shampoo with hair removal cream. Seth retaliates by kidnapping Chelsea's cat and using it to trick Chelsea into jumping over the edge of the Santa Monica Pier and into filthy ocean water.

They briefly come to an agreement, sealed with angry hate sex. However, her lawyer convinces Chelsea to renege and files a restraining order to force Seth to move out of the house.

Pushed to his breaking point, Seth kidnaps Chelsea and takes her to a planetarium. She assumes he's going to murder her, but instead he proposes. Chelsea refuses until he shows her the ring she had previously demanded and she radiantly accepts. He has the ring appraised, sells his house so they can start anew, and convinces Chelsea to marry him on the Las Vegas Strip, because no one in their families will attend after everything that's happened. He promises they'll renew their vows later with a big ceremony. In the airplane bathroom, Larry pleads with Seth to call it off, but the wedding goes forward anyway before an Elvis impersonator.

During their vows, however, Seth says, "I don't think so", and gleefully reveals that their engagement is a ploy. Chelsea dropped her lawsuit and moved out of his house, so she can no longer claim in court to live there. Seth further reveals that his dentist and his assistant posed as a married couple and purchased the house, which they will now sell back to him, and that he bribed a jeweler to "appraise" Chelsea's glass engagement ring as a real diamond worth $75,000. A livid Chelsea grabs the chapel security guard's gun and shoots Seth, who is dancing triumphantly down the aisle, in the buttocks.

The Las Vegas Police Department arrests Chelsea and an ambulance takes Seth away as they scream and trade insults. Chelsea vows to sue him for breach of promise. Seth screams that Chelsea has "turned me off of women" and vows from now on to be "full-on Liberace gay". A sickened Larry and Holly conclude, “We need new friends”. As the ambulance drives away, a horrified Seth recants his coming out after being groped by a male paramedic. A newly single Chelsea tries in the squad car to propose marriage to the arresting officers, one of whom replies, "Lady, don't make me gag you".

== Cast ==
- French Stewart as Seth Winnick
- Bridgette Wilson as Chelsea Turner
- Bill Bellamy as Larry Garnett
- Tyra Banks as Holly Garnett
- Steve Hytner as Marty Mark
- Jason Bateman as Jesse Travis
- Tiffani-Amber Thiessen as Rebecca Melini
- Montrose Hagins as Nana Beatrice Garnett
- Ivana Miličević as Amber
- Renata Scott as Mrs. Littlejohn
- Warren Littlefield as Peter Bloomstein
- Shanna Moakler as Tawny
- Julia Schultz as Tiffany
- Shae Marks as Jasmine
- Colleen Camp as Monica Harris
- John O'Hurley as Walter Drooz
- Luis Ávalos as Judge
- Dale Raoul as Colonic Nurse
- Kevin Farley as Sheriff
- Candy Richardz as Hotel Guest
- Jeff Franklin as Hotel Clerk
- Tom Gammill as Writer
- Dyllan Christopher as Young Boy
- Erika Eleniak as Gina, Jasmine's Friend (uncredited)

== Reception ==
=== Critical reception ===
On the review aggregator website Rotten Tomatoes, 19% of 47 critics' reviews are positive, with an average rating of 3.46/10. The website's consensus reads: "This one-dimensional comedy with recycled laughs will have you holding your nose." Metacritic, which uses a weighted average, assigned the film a score of 23 out of 100, based on 23 critics, indicating "generally unfavorable" reviews.

== Soundtrack ==
1. Love Stinks – Andru Branch
2. Let's Get It On – Marvin Gaye
3. Can't Help Falling in Love – Elvis Presley
4. I Promise – B. Chevis
5. Glaym Lyfe – Shady Montage
6. Fairy Tales – Kevin Perez
7. Why Ya Wanna Do Me (Like This) – Chip Allen
8. Playa Wayz – Andre Branch
9. This Thing Called Love – Jonathan Douglas
10. Na, Na, Na – Brion James
11. I Feel Good – Alexander
