= Tell Me Where It Hurts (The Real Milli Vanilli song) =

"Tell Me Where It Hurts" is a song written by Diane Warren and originally recorded by German pop duo Milli Vanilli for their upcoming album Keep On Running. However, due to the lip-synching scandal, the group The Real Milli Vanilli was formed while Keep On Running was released as their 1991 album The Moment of Truth. The song has been covered by many artists in subsequent years.

== Try 'N' B version ==
"Tell Me Where It Hurts"

Single by Try 'N' B

from the album Sexy Eyes/Try 'N' B
- Released: 1992
- Recorded: 1992
- Genre: Pop
- Length: 4:05 (Radio Mix); 4:00 (LP version)
- Label: RCA
- Songwriter: Diane Warren
- Producer: Frank Farian

Try 'N' B singles chronology
"Sexy Eyes" (1992)	"Tell Me Where It Hurts" (1992)	"Ding Dong" (1993)

The song was first covered by German group Try 'N' B. The group was formed by two members of the Real Milli Vanilli with two new members, and their album was essentially an updated version of that group's album. The group were the first to release the song as a single in 1992, as the second single of their album (titled "Sexy Eyes" in Europe and self-titled in America), but it failed to chart.

== Kathy Troccoli version ==
"Tell Me Where It Hurts"

Single by Kathy Troccoli

from the album Kathy Troccoli
- Released: 1994
- Recorded: 1994
- Length: 3:51 (radio mix); 4:03 (LP version)
- Label: Reunion
- Songwriter: Diane Warren
- Producer: Keith Thomas

Kathy Troccoli singles chronology
"You've Got a Way" (1992)	"Tell Me Where It Hurts" (1994)	"If I'm Not in Love" (1994)

American Contemporary Christian music artist Kathy Troccoli covered the song for her 1994 album Kathy Troccoli and released it as the lead single. It became her second song to enter the US Billboard Hot 100, peaking at No. 88 as well as No. 82 on the US Cash Box Top 100. The song fared better on the Billboard Adult Contemporary charts, where it peaked at No. 16.

=== Charts ===
Chart (1994)	Peak position
US Billboard Hot 100	88
US Adult Contemporary (Billboard)	16
US Cash Box Top 100	82

== Tommy Shane Steiner version ==
"Tell Me Where It Hurts"

Single by Tommy Shane Steiner

from the album Then Came the Night
- Released: 2002
- Recorded: 2002
- Genre: Country
- Length: 4:04
- Label: RCA Nashville
- Songwriter: Diane Warren
- Producer: Jimmy Ritchey

Tommy Shane Steiner singles chronology
"What If She's an Angel" (2001)	"Tell Me Where It Hurts" (2002)	"What We're Gonna Do About It" (2002)

Country singer Tommy Shane Steiner covered the song on his debut album Then Came the Night. The cover was the second single from the album and reached No. 43 on the Billboard Hot Country Singles & Tracks chart.

=== Charts ===
Chart (2001–2002)	Peak position
US Hot Country Songs (Billboard)	43
