= Bridgette Wilson =

American actress, singer, and model (born 1973)

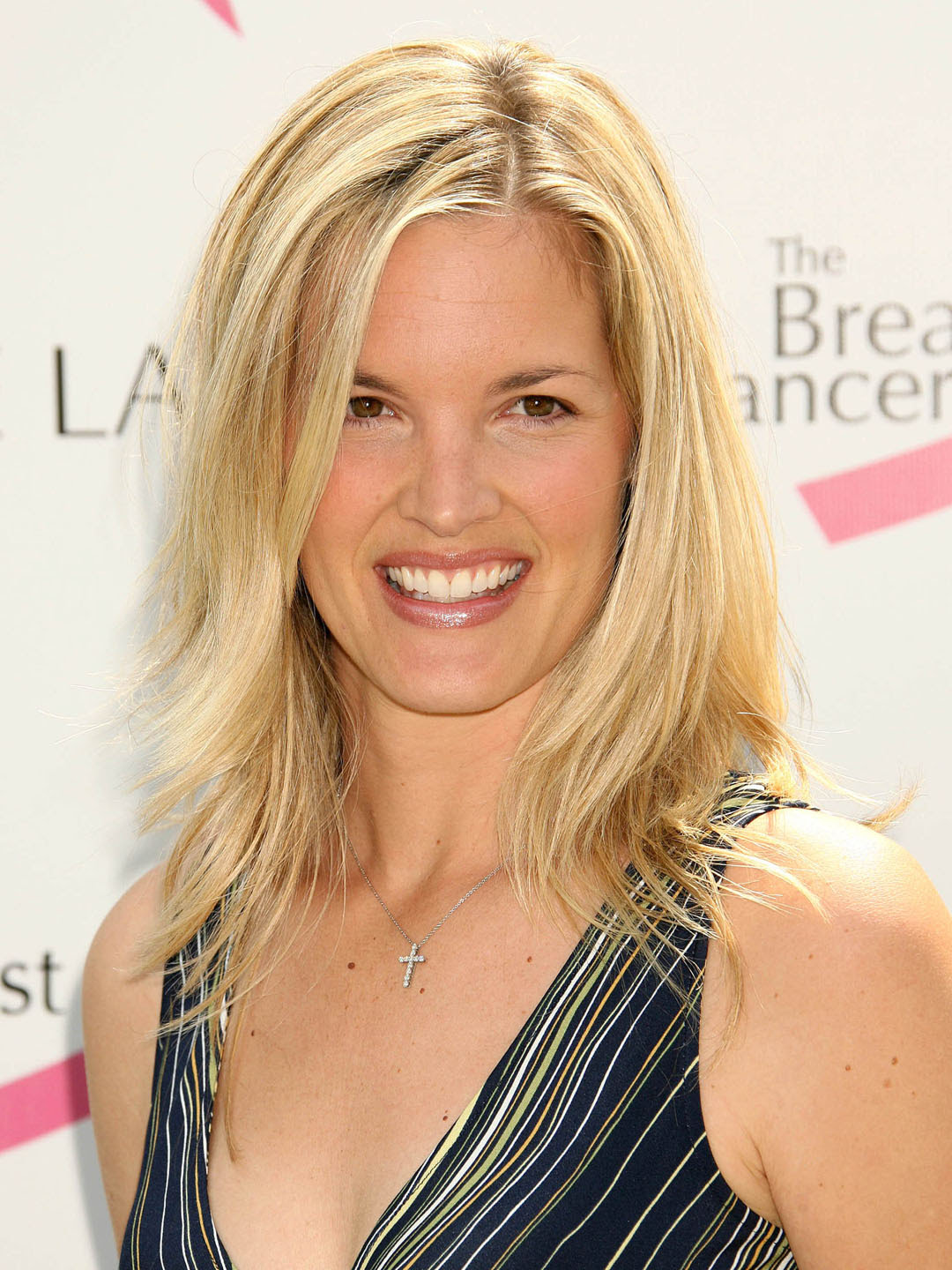
- Wilson at an event at Greystone Estates in Beverly Hills, California, 2006
- Born: Bridgette LeAnn Wilson; September 25, 1973 (age 53); Gold Beach, Oregon, U.S.
- Occupations: Actress; singer; model; beauty queen
- Years active: 1990–2008; 2020
- Height: 5 ft 9 in (1.75 m)
- Spouse: Pete Sampras (m. 2000)
- Children: 2

Bridgette LeAnn Wilson Sampras (born September 25, 1973) is an American former actress, singer, model and beauty queen who was crowned Miss Teen USA 1990. She began her career in acting, playing the character of Lisa Fenimore on the soap opera Santa Barbara from April 1992 to January 1993.

She appeared in a number of films including Last Action Hero (1993) in her film debut, Higher Learning (1995), Mortal Kombat (1995), and Billy Madison (1995). She had roles in I Know What You Did Last Summer (1997), House on Haunted Hill (1999), The Wedding Planner (2001), and Shopgirl (2005).

== Early life ==
Bridgette LeAnn Wilson was born in Gold Beach, Oregon, a small coastal town north of Brookings, the daughter of Kathy and Dale Wilson. She grew up there and was on the volleyball team for Gold Beach High School. She won the Miss Teen USA title in 1990 at the age of 16 in Biloxi, Mississippi, and was the second winner from Oregon. She graduated from Gold Beach High School in 1991.

== Career ==
After her reign as Miss Teen USA, Wilson appeared in Santa Barbara, Ginger on Saved by the Bell, Last Action Hero (as Jack Slater's daughter Whitney), Higher Learning (a cameo as a university student), Billy Madison (playing Veronica Vaughn, the teacher and girlfriend of Adam Sandler's character), Mortal Kombat (playing Sonya Blade), Nixon (a cameo as a nightclub performer), I Know What You Did Last Summer (as Helen Shivers' sister Elsa), House on Haunted Hill (as Melissa Marr), Buying the Cow, The Suburbans, Love Stinks, Nevada, Sweet Evil (as a psychopathic surrogate mother), Extreme Ops (as a world-champion skier), and The Wedding Planner. Wilson also appeared on an episode of CSI: Miami as a woman whose husband is killed by a package delivered to their house. Her last film role before retiring from acting was in Phantom Punch (2008).

Wilson starred off-Broadway in The Rocky Horror Show and was a judge for the 2006 Miss Universe competition. She is also a singer and was featured on Tommy Shane Steiner's debut album Then Came the Night, performing a spoken-word part in "What We're Gonna Do About It". The song reached number 43 on the Billboard Hot Country Songs charts in 2002.

== Personal life ==
Wilson married professional tennis player Pete Sampras on September 30, 2000 after they dated for nine months. On November 21, 2002, their first son was born. On July 29, 2005, the couple had their second son. The family lives in Lake Sherwood, California west of Westlake Village. In December 2022, Wilson was diagnosed with ovarian cancer.

== Filmography ==
Film
Year	Title	Role	Notes
1993	Last Action Hero	Whitney Slater/Meredith Caprice	
1995	Higher Learning	Nicole	
1995	Billy Madison	Veronica Vaughn	
1995	Mortal Kombat	Sonya Blade	
1995	Nixon	Sandy	
1996	Final Vendetta	Jennifer Clark	Also known as Sweet Evil.
1996	Unhook the Stars	Jeannie Hawks	
1997	Nevada	June	
1997	The Stepsister	Melinda Harrison	TV film
1997	The Real Blonde	Sahara	
1997	I Know What You Did Last Summer	Elsa Shivers	
1997	Marina		Short film
1998	Host	Juliet Spring	TV film
1998	Starstruck	Sandra	
1999	The Suburbans	Lara	
1999	Love Stinks	Chelsea Turner	
1999	House on Haunted Hill	Melissa Margaret Marr	
2000	Beautiful	Lorna Larkin, Miss Texas	
2001	The Wedding Planner	Fran Donolly	
2001	Just Visiting	Amber	
2002	Buying the Cow	Sarah	
2002	Extreme Ops	Chloe	
2005	Shopgirl	Lisa Cramer	
2008	Phantom Punch	Farah	

Television
Year	Title	Role	Notes
1992	Saved by the Bell	Ginger	5 episodes
1992–1993	Santa Barbara	Lisa Fenimore	20 episodes
1993	Murder, She Wrote	Emily Griffith	Episode: "A Killing in Cork"
2000–2001	The $treet	Bridget Deshiel	11 episodes
2002	Frasier	Kris	Episode: "Three Blind Dates"
2003	CSI: Miami	Gabriela Betancourt	Episode: "Dead Zone"
2004	Beyond the Glory	Herself	Episode: "Pete Sampras"
2005	Jake in Progress	Chloe	Episode: "Ubusy?"
2008	Carpoolers	Dorrit	Episode: "The Seminar"
2008	Signature Series	Herself	Episode: "Pete Sampras"

Video games
Year	Title	Role	Notes
2020	Mortal Kombat 11	Sonya Blade (Klassic MK Movie Skin Pack)	Voice-over and likeness based on her role in the 1995 live action film

== Discography ==
=== Albums ===
Title	Details
I Only Wanna Be with You	Release date: 1994; Label: King Records
Gimme a Kiss	Release date: 1996; Label: King Records

=== Guest singles ===
Year	Single	Artist	Peak positions	Album
Year	Single	Artist	US Country	Album
2002	"What We're Gonna Do About It"	Tommy Shane Steiner	43	Then Came the Night
