= What If She's an Angel =

Single by Tommy Shane Steiner

from the album Then Came the Night
- B-side: "The Mind of John J. Blanchard"
- Released: December 3, 2001
- Genre: Country
- Length: 3:35
- Label: RCA Nashville
- Songwriter: Bryan Wayne
- Producer: Jimmy Ritchey

Tommy Shane Steiner singles chronology
"What If She's an Angel" (2001)	"Tell Me Where It Hurts" (2002)

"What If She's an Angel" is a song written by Bryan Wayne and recorded by American country music artist Tommy Shane Steiner. It was released as Steiner's debut single in December 2001 from his debut album Then Came the Night. The song reached No. 2 on the Billboard Hot Country Singles & Tracks chart in May 2002, becoming his only hit single. On the Billboard Hot 100, it peaked at No. 39.

== Chart performance ==
"What If She's an Angel" debuted at number 52 on the U.S. Billboard Hot Country Singles & Tracks for the week of December 22, 2001.

Chart (2001–2002)	Peak position
US Billboard Hot 100	39
US Hot Country Songs (Billboard)	2

=== Year-end charts ===
Chart (2002)	Position
US Country Songs (Billboard)	12
