= Buying the Cow =

2002 film by Walt Becker

- DVD cover
- Directed by: Walt Becker
- Written by: Walt Becker; Peter W. Nelson
- Produced by: Bradley Jenkel; Dan Etheridge
- Starring: Jerry O'Connell; Bridgette Wilson; Alyssa Milano; Ryan Reynolds; Annabeth Gish
- Cinematography: Nancy Schreiber
- Edited by: Tony Lombardo
- Music by: Andrew Gross
- Distributed by: Destination Films
- Release date: 2002
- Running time: 88 minutes
- Country: United States
- Language: English

Buying the Cow is a 2002 American screwball comedy film directed by Walt Becker and starring Jerry O'Connell, Ryan Reynolds, Alyssa Milano and Bridgette L. Wilson.

== Plot ==
David is too afraid to commit to his girlfriend Sarah, who is pressuring him to get married. While she goes away to New York for work for two months, David's friends persuade him to experience the dating scene one more time. Meanwhile, David's womanizing friend Mike gets drunk one night and mistakenly believes he has had sex with a man, and afterwards makes several awkward attempts to come out of the closet, even though he is not really gay.

== Cast ==
- Jerry O'Connell as David Collins
- Bridgette L. Wilson as Sarah
- Alyssa Milano as Amy
- Ryan Reynolds as Mike Hanson
- Annabeth Gish as Nicole
- Bill Bellamy as "Jonesy" Jones
- Jon Tenney as Andrew Hahn
- Ron Livingston as Tyler Carter Bellows
- Erinn Bartlett as Julie Madison
- Scarlett Chorvat as Katie Madison
- David DeLuise as Frat Guy
- Sonya Eddy as Security Woman
- Alma Beltran as Hispanic Woman

== Production ==
In March 1999, it was reported that the Walt Becker and Peter W. Nelson penned Buying the Cow had been selected as an honorable mention in the Peter Stark Screenwriting Competition held during the 14th Santa Barbara International Film Festival. In October of that year, it was reported that Destination Films had acquired Buying the Cow and set Becker to make his directorial debut on the film, while Jerry O'Connell was in final negotiations to star in the film.

== Release ==
The film was originally scheduled to be released in the fall or holiday season of 2000, but following the collapse of Destination Films due to a lack of equity investment funds were no long available to release the film. Distribution rights were acquired by Sony Pictures, which had a distribution agreement with Destination via their Columbia TriStar Home Video label, with the intention of releasing Buying the Cow theatrically in 2002 via their Screen Gems label. Buying the Cow ultimately ended up being released in late 2002, after Van Wilder had already been released.

== Reception ==
Robert Pardi of TV Guide rated it 1/5 stars and called it "memorable for all the wrong reasons" because of its misogyny and homophobia.
