= The Heart of Me (album) =

Studio album by Kathy Troccoli
- Released: September 24, 2002
- Studio: Fun Attic Studio (Franklin, Tennessee); House of Big and Sound Kitchen (Nashville, Tennessee); Scrimshaw Sound (Antioch, Tennessee)
- Genre: CCM, Christian pop, inspirational
- Length: 43:46
- Label: Reunion
- Producer: Christopher Harris; Nathan DiGesare

Kathy Troccoli chronology
Love Has a Name (2000)	The Heart of Me (2002)	Greatest Hits (2003)

The Heart of Me is the twelfth studio album by Christian singer-songwriter Kathy Troccoli. It was released on September 24, 2002, by Reunion Records. The album earned Troccoli her third Grammy nomination (her first since 1988) for Best Pop/Contemporary Gospel Album at the 45th Grammy Awards. The Heart of Me debuted and peaked at number 37 on the Billboard Top Christian Albums chart.

== Track listing ==
No.	Title	Writer(s)	Length
1.	"Take Me Higher"	Kathy Troccoli, Bruce Sudano, Alisa Gyse, Nathan DiGesare	3:41
2.	"You're the Heart of Me" (*)	Ty Lacy, Sam Mizell, Steve Siler	4:10
3.	"All for the Life of Me" (*)	Don Koch, Tony Wood, Brian White	4:36
4.	"Ever Since the Day"	K. Troccoli, N. DiGesare, Mike Norello	3:57
5.	"Love Has Come"	K. Troccoli, N. DiGesare, Matt Maher	5:06
6.	"A Love That Won't Walk Away"	T. Lacy, Jess Cates	3:55
7.	"Heaven Knows"	K. Troccoli, N. DiGesare	5:18
8.	"He Will Shelter You" (*)	T. Lacy, Arnie Roman	3:50
9.	"Just Like You"	M. Maher	4:01
10.	"You're Still God" (*)	K. Troccoli, Dorothy Ophals	5:12

Note: (*) - tracks produced by Christopher Harris; all remaining tracks produced by Nathan DiGesare.

== Personnel ==
- Kathy Troccoli – vocals
- Nathan DiGesare – synthesizer programming, arrangements, string arrangements
- Bernie Herms – synthesizer programming, string arrangements
- Mike Lorello – synthesizer programming
- Kent Hooper – keyboards, programming
- Pat Coil – acoustic piano
- Gary Burnette – guitars, resonator guitar
- David Cleveland – guitars
- Jerry McPherson – guitars
- Mark Hill – bass
- Chris Kent – bass
- Craig Nelson – bass
- Jackie Street – bass
- Dan Needham – drums, hand drums, percussion
- Scott Williamson – drums
- Eric Darken – percussion
- Taylor Harris – percussion
- Craig Alea – string arrangements
- The Nashville String Machine – strings
- Alisa Gyse – backing vocals
- Leann Albrecht – backing vocals
- Matt Baugher – backing vocals
- Lisa Cochran – backing vocals
- Chris Harris – backing vocals
- Felicia Sorensen – backing vocals
- Justin Unger – backing vocals

=== Production ===
- Matt Baugher – executive producer
- Dean Diehl – executive producer
- Jason McArthur – A&R
- Nathan DiGesare – producer (1, 4–7, 9), engineer
- Christopher Harris – producer (2, 3, 8, 10)
- David Schober – engineer, mixing
- Kent Hooper – engineer, mixing
- Todd Robbins – engineer
- Dave Dillbeck – engineer
- Kevin Pickle – assistant engineer
- PJ Heimmernman – production coordinator (2, 3, 8, 10)

== Critical reception ==
Professional ratings
Review scores
Source	Rating
Cross Rhythms	9/10 stars

Trevor Kirk of Cross Rhythms rated The Heart of Me 9 out of 10 saying that "throughout the album, every song is a strong one. Kathy has several songwriting credits, notably on 'Heaven Knows' and the closer, 'You're Still God,' a five minute-plus paean of praise to her Saviour. Definitely recommended."

== Charts ==
Chart (2002)	Peak position
US Top Christian Albums (Billboard)	37

=== Radio singles ===
Year	Singles	Peak positions
Year	Singles	CCM Inspo
2002	"All for the Life of Me"	4
2003	"You're the Heart of Me"	18
