= A Sentimental Christmas =

Studio album by Kathy Troccoli
- Released: September 28, 1999
- Studio: Omega Recording Studios (Rockville, Maryland); Quad Studios (Nashville, Tennessee)
- Genre: CCM, Christmas, jazz, pop standards
- Length: 41:57
- Label: Reunion
- Producer: Kathy Troccoli; Larry Day

Kathy Troccoli chronology
Together (1999)	A Sentimental Christmas (1999)	Love Has a Name (2000)

A Sentimental Christmas is the first Christmas album by American Christian singer-songwriter Kathy Troccoli. It was released on September 28, 1999, by Reunion Records. The album features holiday favorites, plus a duet with Andy Williams on his signature Christmas classic "It's the Most Wonderful Time of the Year" and an original song "Only Always" written by Troccoli and Jeff Franzel. Troccoli co-produced the album with Larry Day. A Sentimental Christmas debuted and peaked at number 40 on the Billboard Heatseekers Albums chart.

== Track listing ==
1. "White Christmas" (Irving Berlin) - 4:22
2. "It's the Most Wonderful Time of the Year" (duet with Andy Williams) (Edward Pola, George Wyle) - 3:12
3. "O Little Town of Bethlehem/Away in a Manger" (Phillips Brooks/Traditional) - 2:43
4. "Only Always" (Kathy Troccoli, Jeff Franzel) - 3:19
5. "Winter Wonderland" (Felix Bernard, Richard Bernhard Smith) - 3:17
6. "What Child Is This?" (William Chatterton Dix) - 3:42
7. "Let It Snow! Let It Snow! Let It Snow!" (Jule Styne, Sammy Cahn) - 3:07
8. "I'll Be Home for Christmas" (Walter Kent, Kim Gannon, Buck Ram) - 3:45
9. "The Christmas Song" (Robert Wells, Mel Tormé) - 3:28
10. "Sleigh Ride" (Leroy Anderson, Mitchell Parish) - 3:46
11. "Silent Night" (Franz X. Gruber, Joseph Mohr) - 4:32
12. "Have Yourself a Merry Little Christmas" (Hugh Martin, Ralph Blane) - 2:44

== Personnel ==
- Kathy Troccoli – vocals
- Jeff Franzel – acoustic piano
- Robert Redd – acoustic piano
- John Leonard – bass
- Dominic Smith – drums
- Mark Douthit – saxophones
- Rob Holmes – saxophones
- Ben Kono – saxophones
- Luis Hernandez – saxophones
- Marty Nau – saxophones, alto saxophone, soprano saxophone, flute, horn contractor
- Harvey Coonin – trombone
- Jim McFalls – trombone
- John Montgomery – trombone
- Chris Walker – trumpet
- Tom Williams – trumpet, flugelhorn
- Don Marsh – arrangements
- Scott Silbert – arrangements
- Andy Williams – vocals (2)

=== Production ===
- Dean Diehl – executive producer
- George King – executive producer
- Kathy Troccoli – producer
- Larry Day – producer
- Lynn Fuston – engineer, mixing
- Doug Sarrett – engineer
- Michael Wilson – enhanced CD development
- Elizabeth Workman – art direction
- Chad Hunter – design
- Tim Parker – design
- Robert Fleischauer – photography

== Critical reception ==
Professional ratings
Review scores
Source	Rating
AllMusic	2.5/5 stars
Cross Rhythms	6/10 stars

Steve Huey of AllMusic says A Sentimental Christmas "plays it pretty safe, even as Christmas albums go — there's one new composition, 'Only Always,' but the other 11 selections (one a medley) are time-tested holiday standards performed with big-band arrangements. It's all very traditional, evoking images of warm fires and family gatherings, and that's exactly the kind of Christmas record most people will want."

Tony Cummings of Cross Rhythms has called the album a "classy set" and that Troccoli has added "jazz phrasing to her impressive vocal armoury and with her Sarah Vaughn-style interpretations of a set of Christmas standards and jazz accompaniments classily produced by Larry Day and Troccoli, this is definitely one for the sophisticates among us."

== Charts ==
Chart (1999)	Peak position
US Heatseekers Album Chart (Billboard)	40
