= The Suburbans =

- DVD cover for The Suburbans
- Directed by: Donal Lardner Ward
- Written by: Donal Lardner Ward; Tony Guma
- Produced by: J. J. Abrams; Michael Burns; Leanna Creel; Brad Krevoy
- Starring: Jennifer Love Hewitt; Craig Bierko; Amy Brenneman; Will Ferrell
- Cinematography: Michael Barrett
- Edited by: Kathryn Himoff
- Music by: Robbie Konder
- Production companies: TriStar Pictures; Motion Picture Corporation of America
- Distributed by: Sony Pictures Releasing
- Release date: October 29, 1999
- Running time: 81 minutes
- Country: United States
- Language: English
- Box office: $11,130

The Suburbans is a 1999 American comedy drama film directed by Donal Lardner Ward, who co-wrote it with Tony Guma. It stars Ward, Craig Bierko, Will Ferrell, and Tony Guma as one hit wonder band the Suburbans and Jennifer Love Hewitt as a record company executive who wants to re-establish the band's fame.

The Suburbans premiered at the Sundance Film Festival on January 25, 1999, and received a limited theatrical release in 11 screens on October 29, and grossed $11,130. The film received negative reviews from critics

== Plot ==
In 1998, Danny, Mitch, Gil and Rory, who were once a long-forgotten, early 1980s one-hit wonder band, the Suburbans, reunite to perform their only hit single at Gil's wedding. After the gig, Cate, an up-and-coming record company executive, approaches them and suggests shooting a pay-per-view reunion show that would eventually re-establish the band's claim to fame. The four, more reluctantly than not, agree and subsequently face the ramifications on their personal lives as the show's production contrasts their former rock 'n' roll image with their now middle-class, suburban lifestyle. It soon becomes evident that Cate is probably the only remaining fan of the band, who, out of a personal interest in the matter, put her own career at stake.

== Cast ==
- Jennifer Love Hewitt as Cate, a record company executive, who wants to re-establish the band's claim to fame
- Donal Lardner Ward as Danny Moran, the Suburbans's lead singer
- Craig Bierko as Mitch, the Suburbans's guitarist
- Will Ferrell as Gil, the Suburbans's bass player
- Tony Guma as Rory, the Suburbans's drummer
- Ben Stiller as Jay Rose, a record company owner
- Jerry Stiller as Speedo Silverberg, a record company owner
- Amy Brenneman as Grace, Danny's girlfriend
- Bridgette Wilson as Lara, Rory's girlfriend
- Perrey Reeves as Amanda
- Robert Loggia as Jules Marcelle
- David LaChapelle as Thorlakur
- J. J. Abrams as Rock Journalist
- Dick Clark as himself
- Kurt Loder as himself
- A Flock of Seagulls as themselves
- Brian Chlebowski as Kenny

== See also ==
- Sugar Town, another "rock-and-roll and relationships" film released a month earlier, and called by Janet Maslin—in her review of The Suburbans—a "better and more ambitious recent film that [also, in retrospect] had no luck in finding an audience"
