= Untitled Hymn: A Collection of Hymns =

Studio album by Chris Rice
- Released: 2019-05-17
- Genre: Gospel
- Length: 40:32
- Label: Fair Trade/Columbia
- Producer: Ken Lewis

Chris Rice chronology
Songs We Wrote on Tuesdays (2019)	Untitled Hymn: A Collection of Hymns (2019)

Professional ratings
Review scores
Source	Rating
Hallels	4/5 stars
Jesus Freak Hideout	4/5 stars

Untitled Hymn: A Collection of Hymns is the tenth studio album by Chris Rice. After more than a decade since his previous solo release, Rice and Fair Trade Services released a collection of hymns that FeeCCM.com calls a "celebration of the sound theology and sweet poetry of these classic songs of faith." Timothy Yap at Hallels is more reserved in his review, expressing disappointment that Rice has released another collection of hymns instead of original songs, but concludes that this disappointment is "redeemed by the creativity and ingenuity invested in re-imagining these hymns."

== Release history ==
Untitled Hymn: A Collection of Hymns was released on May 17, 2019.

This new collection features Rice's take on classics as "Amazing Grace" and "This Is My Father's World", and also includes Rice's acclaimed original "Untitled Hymn (Come To Jesus)" and closes with "Too Much I Love," a new song that started as one of the poems in his book, Widen: A Collection of Poems.

== Track listing ==
All songs composed as noted as "(words / music)".

1. "What a Friend We Have in Jesus" (Joseph Scriven/ Charles Crozat Converse) - 2:56
2. "Amazing Grace" (John Newton) - 3:34
3. "Untitled Hymn (Come To Jesus)" (Chris Rice) - 3:56
4. "O For a Thousand Tongues" (Charles Wesley/Carl Gottholf Glaser) - 3:24
5. "When I Survey the Wondrous Cross" (Isaac Watts) - 3:26
6. "This Is My Father's World" (Maltbie Davenport Babcock) - 2:53
7. "There Is a Fountain" (William Cowper) - 3:24
8. "Leaning on the Everlasting Arms" (Anthony J. Showalter and Elisha Hoffman/Showalter) - 3:15
9. "Hallelujah, What A Savior" (Philip P. Bliss) - 4:04
10. "Were You There" (African American spiritual) - 2:59
11. "Fairest Lord Jesus" (traditional) - 4:11
12. "Too Much I Love" (Chris Rice) - 2:10

== Personnel ==
- Chris Rice – acoustic piano, acoustic guitar

With:

- Blair Masters – acoustic piano, keyboards
- David Cleveland – acoustic guitar
- Ken Lewis – percussion
- Avery Bright – violin
- David Davidson – violin
