= Together (Sandi Patty and Kathy Troccoli album) =

Studio album by Sandi Patty and Kathy Troccoli
- Released: July 27, 1999
- Genre: Pop standards, jazz, MOR
- Length: 54:12
- Label: Monarch
- Producer: Robbie Buchanan; Bob Krogstad; Mark Gasbarro

Sandi Patty chronology
Libertad me das (1998)	Together (1999)	These Days (2000)

Kathy Troccoli chronology
Corner of Eden (1998)	Together (1999)	A Sentimental Christmas (1999)

Professional ratings
Review scores
Source	Rating
AllMusic	4.5/5 stars

Together is the first collaborative album by American Christian music female artists Sandi Patty and Kathy Troccoli. It was released on July 27, 1999, on Monarch Records. With Patty and Troccoli still signed to their Christian music labels Word and Reunion respectively, it is Patty's nineteenth album and Troccoli's ninth album. It features Patty singing the Gershwin songbook and Troccoli singing Broadway show tunes. Patty and Troccoli sing duets on three songs. "I Remember" performed by Troccoli is one of two original solo songs produced and arranged by Robbie Buchanan and was released to mainstream AC radio as the lead single. Patty sings the other original solo song "The Last Day" which was written by Brenda Russell.

== Critical reception ==
Jonathan Widran of AllMusic gave Together 4 1/2 out of 5 stars saying "Best known for their popularity in the Christian music market, these two singing dynamos create a nearly religious experience combining Troccoli's love for Judy Garland's legendary performances and Patty's attachment to Gershwin, and then meeting in the middle for two brand new odes to nostalgia, the passion ballad 'The Last Day' and the lush, almost tearful 'I Remember.' These two new numbers were produced and arranged by Robbie Buchanan, and while they are nice tunes covering the theme of looking back, they pale in comparison to the standards. Their performances are exquisite, but some of the credit needs to go to the slew of arrangers and musical settings they work with." Widran also said "This labor of love's tag line 'A Celebration of Classic Popular Songs from Garland To Gershwin' says it all. It's hard to miss with such fine material, but even harder when those singing it have felt the passion of every note."

== Track listing ==
No.	Title	Writer(s)	Length
1.	"Together (Wherever We Go)" (Patty, Troccoli)	Jule Styne, Stephen Sondheim	2:37
2.	"The Last Day" (Patty)	Brenda Russell	3:53
3.	"Embraceable You" (Troccoli)	George Gershwin, Ira Gershwin	5:07
4.	"A Foggy Day" (Patty)	G. Gershwin, I. Gershwin	3:47
5.	"Come Rain or Come Shine" (Troccoli)	Harold Arlen, Johnny Mercer	3:55
6.	"Summertime" (Patty)	G. Gershwin, I. Gershwin, DuBose Heyward	4:36
7.	"You Made Me Love You" (Troccoli)	James V. Monaco, Joseph McCarthy	6:12
8.	"I Remember" (Troccoli)	Kathy Troccoli, Kevin Stokes, Tony Wood	4:27
9.	"They Can't Take That Away from Me" (Patty)	G. Gershwin, I. Gershwin	4:52
10.	"The Trolley Song" (Troccoli)	Hugh Martin, Ralph Blane	3:07
11.	"The Man I Love" (Patty)	G. Gershwin, I. Gershwin	4:25
12.	"Over the Rainbow" (Patty, Troccoli)	Harold Arlen, Yip Harburg	4:36
13.	"Get Happy/Happy Days Are Here Again" (Patty, Troccoli)	H. Arlen, Ted Koehler/Milton Ager, Jack Yellen	2:38

== Radio singles ==
Year	Singles	Peak positions	
Year	Singles	US AC	R&R AC
1999	"I Remember" (Kathy Troccoli)	27	23
