= What a Heart Is Beating For =

Studio album by Chris Rice
- Released: July 17, 2007
- Studio: Sound Kitchen and The Hideout (Franklin, Tennessee); Fireside Studios and Sound Emporium (Nashville, Tennessee)
- Genre: Contemporary Christian, adult contemporary
- Length: 47:03
- Label: Sony
- Producer: Monroe Jones

What a Heart Is Beating For is the eighth album by Chris Rice. CCM Magazine reviewed the album as "a collection of new songs full of introspective lyrics and beautiful musical arrangements." The song "Lemonade" was released as a single.

== Track listing ==
All tracks written and composed by Chris Rice.

1. "So Much For My Sad Song" – 3:53
2. "What a Heart Is Beating For" – 5:16
3. "Pardon My Dust" – 3:16
4. "Love Is Gonna Break Through" – 3:56
5. "You Don't Have To Yell" – 4:11
6. "Punch Lines and Ironies" – 4:09
7. "Lemonade" – 3:05
8. "Here Come Those Eyes" – 2:31
9. "Let the Words Escape" – 4:07
10. "Sneakin' Into Heaven" – 3:33
11. "Tell Me the Story Again" – 3:22
12. "Kids Again" – 3:14
13. "Baby Take Your Bow" – 2:30

== Personnel ==
- Chris Rice – vocals, backing vocals, acoustic piano, Fender Rhodes
- Monroe Jones – keyboards (3, 6)
- Jeff Roach – keyboards (3, 6)
- Jerry McPherson – guitars (1-3, 5, 7-13)
- Paul Moak – guitars (1, 5, 6)
- Steve Lywicke – guitars (4)
- Mark Hill – bass
- Ken Lewis – drums, percussion
- David Angell – strings
- John Catchings – strings
- David Davidson – strings
- Kristin Wilkinson – strings

Production

- Monroe Jones – producer, recording
- Jim Dineen – recording
- Steve Blackmon – assistant engineer
- Kyle Ford – assistant engineer
- Buckley Miller – assistant engineer
- F. Reid Shippen – mixing at Sound Stage Studios (Nashville, Tennessee)
- Andrew Mendleson – mastering at Georgetown Masters (Nashville, Tennessee)
- Matt Lehman – artwork (for Invisible Associates)
- Jeremy Cowart – photography
- Dana Salsedo – grooming
- Amber Lehman – stylist
