= Corner of Eden =

Studio album by Kathy Troccoli
- Released: October 13, 1998
- Studio: Quad Studios, Ocean Way Nashville, Starstruck Studios and Scrimshaw Sound (Nashville, Tennessee); The Bennett House (Franklin, Tennessee)
- Genre: CCM, Christian pop, inspirational
- Length: 51:24
- Label: Reunion
- Producer: Nathan DiGesare

Kathy Troccoli chronology
| Love & Mercy (1997) | Corner of Eden (1998) | Together (1999) |

Professional ratings
Review scores
| Source | Rating |
|---|---|
| AllMusic | 4/5 stars |
| Cross Rhythms | 4/10 stars |

Corner of Eden is the eighth studio album by Christian singer-songwriter Kathy Troccoli, released on October 13, 1998, on Reunion Records. The album won a Dove Award for Inspirational Album of the Year given to Troccoli and the album's producer Nathan DiGesare at the 30th GMA Dove Awards. Corner of Eden peaked at number 17 on the Top Christian Albums and number 26 on the Heatseekers Albums charts in Billboard magazine.

== Track listing ==
1. "A Different Road" (Kathy Troccoli, Bruce Sudano, Nathan DiGesare) - 6:30
2. "At Your Mercy" (Troccoli, DiGesare) - 4:35
3. "He Will Make a Way" (Troccoli, Sudano, DiGesare) - 6:09
4. "Psalm Twenty-Three" (Troccoli, DiGesare) - 4:49
5. "Goodbye for Now" (Troccoli, Scott Brasher) - 6:02
6. "We Will Know Love" (Troccoli, DiGesare, Mike McEvoy) - 4:40
7. "Fill Me Up" (Troccoli, DiGesare) - 5:01
8. "Corner of Eden" (Troccoli, Stephanie Lewis, Jeff Franzel) - 4:35
9. "When I Look at You" (Troccoli, DiGesare) - 4:23
10. "Take Me with You" (Troccoli, DiGesare) - 4:40

== Personnel ==
- Kathy Troccoli – vocals
- Michael Omartian – keyboards (1, 3)
- Bernie Herms – synthesizers (1)
- Nathan DiGesare – keyboard programming (1, 2, 4, 6), acoustic piano (2, 4, 6, 9, 10), orchestrations (9)
- Steve Winwood – Hammond B3 organ (3)
- Tom Howard – orchestrations (1, 5), choir director (1), acoustic piano (5, 7, 8)
- Micah Wilshire – guitars (1, 9)
- David Cleveland – guitars (2, 7)
- Steve Cropper – guitars (3)
- Chris Rodriguez – guitars (4, 8, 10)
- Michael McEvoy – guitars (6), mandolin (6), viola (6)
- Jackie Street – bass (1–3, 7, 9)
- Gary Lunn – bass (4, 8)
- Scott Firth – bass (6)
- Scott Williamson – drums (1, 4, 7–9)
- Chester Thompson – drums (3)
- Walfredo Reyes Jr. – drums (6), percussion (6)
- Eric Darken – percussion (1, 3, 4, 7–9)
- Nashville String Machine – strings (1, 5, 9)
- Chris De Margary – tin whistle (6)
- Roger Ryan – choir director (3)
- Natalie Grant – backing vocals (1–3, 8)
- Tim Davis – backing vocals (1, 3, 8)
- Darwin Hobbs – backing vocals (1, 3)
- Nicol Smith – backing vocals (1, 3, 8)
- Valerie Chalmers – backing vocals (6)
- Emma Whittle – backing vocals (6)

Production

- Matt Baugher – executive producer
- Bruce Koblish – executive producer
- Nathan DiGesare – producer
- Paul "Salvo" Salveson – recording, mixing
- Alex Chan – assistant engineer
- Scott McCutcheon – assistant engineer
- Shawn McLean – assistant engineer
- J.R. Rodriguez – assistant engineer
- Aaron Swihart – assistant engineer
- Ken Love – mastering at MasterMix (Nashville, Tennessee)
- Dave Fry – keyboard and technical assistant
- Jim Rogers – keyboard and technical assistant
- James Arledge – piano technician
- Ric Domenico – music preparation
- Mike Goode – music preparation
- Matthew Barnes – photography
- Diana Lussenden – art direction, design

== Charts ==
| Chart (1998) | Peak position |
|---|---|
| US Top Christian Albums (Billboard) | 17 |
| US Top Heatseekers Albums (Billboard) | 26 |

=== Radio singles ===
| Year | Singles | Peak positions |
| Year | Singles | CCM AC |
|---|---|---|
| 1998 | "Psalm Twenty-Three" | 3 |
| 1999 | "A Different Road" | 5 |

== Accolades ==
GMA Dove Awards

| Year | Winner | Category |
|---|---|---|
| 1999 | Corner of Eden | Inspirational Album of the Year |
