= Artist of My Soul =

Studio album by Sandi Patty
- Released: October 14, 1997
- Studio: Bill Schnee Studios, North Hollywood, California; The Hop, Los Angeles, California; CTS Studios, London, England; Track Record Studios, North Hollywood, CA
- Genre: CCM, inspirational music, Christian pop
- Length: 47:37
- Label: Word
- Producer: Robbie Buchanan

Sandi Patty chronology
An American Songbook (1996)	Artist of My Soul (1997)	Libertad me das (1998)

Artist of My Soul is the eighteenth studio album by Christian singer Sandi Patty, released in 1997 on Word Records. It was produced by Robbie Buchanan, whose production, arrangement and keyboardist credits include artists like Amy Grant, Whitney Houston, Rascal Flatts and Neil Diamond. The album peaked at number 3 on the Heatseekers Albums, number 7 on the Top Christian Albums and number 155 on the Top 200 Albums charts in Billboard magazine. Artist of My Soul won Inspirational Album of the Year at the 29th GMA Dove Awards.

== Track listing ==
No.	Title	Writer(s)	Length
1.	"Artist of My Soul"	Rick Vale	3:37
2.	"Always"	Wintley Phipps, John Stoddart	3:26
3.	"Breathe on Me"	Matt Huesmann, Grant Cunningham	3:30
4.	"You Love Me"	Kevin Stokes, Tony Wood	4:46
5.	"You Set Me Free"	Joel Lindsey	6:04
6.	"Birds Still Dance"	Greg Nelson, Bob Farrell	4:15
7.	"You Alone"	T. Wood, Scott Krippayne	3:57
8.	"Speechless"	T. Wood, K. Stokes, Marie Reynolds	4:58
9.	"I Will Sing the Wondrous Story"	Francis H. Rowley; arranged by R. Vale, Robbie Buchanan	4:44
10.	"Come to Me"	G. Nelson, Phil McHugh	4:00
11.	"Doxology"	R. Vale, Sandi Patty	4:20

== Personnel ==
- Sandi Patty – vocals, backing vocals (3)
- Robbie Buchanan – acoustic piano, synthesizers, Hammond B3 organ, arrangements
- Michael Landau – guitars
- Neil Stubenhaus – bass
- Mike Baird – drums
- Sandra Crouch – tambourine (7)
- Steve Tavaglione – soprano saxophone (3)
- The London Studio Orchestra – orchestra (1, 2, 4–6, 8–11)
- Tom Howard – orchestrations (1, 2, 5, 6, 11)
- Bob Krogstad – arrangements (4, 8–10), orchestrations (4, 8–10)
- Rolf Wilson – concertmaster (1, 2, 4–6, 8–11)
- Orion Crawford – music preparation
- Warren Stayner – backing vocals (3)
- Faith Central Missionary Baptist Church – choir (7)
- Barbara Allen – choir director (7)

Production

- Matt Baugher – executive producer
- Robbie Buchanan – producer
- Brent Bourgeois – A&R direction
- Bubba Smith – A&R direction
- Jeremy Smith – recording
- Dick Lewzey – orchestra recording
- Bill Buckingham – additional recording
- KojI Egawa – tracking and vocal recording assistant
- Nick Harris – orchestra recording assistant
- Scott Erickson – overdub and BGV recording assistant, production coordinator
- Johnny Q – overdub and BGV recording assistant
- Bill Schnee – mixing at The Factory Studios (Vancouver, British Columbia, Canada)
- Ryen Froggatt – mix assistant
- Doug Sax – mastering at The Mastering Lab (Hollywood, California)
- Linda Bourne Wornell – A&R coordinator
- Beth Lee – art direction
- Gina Binkley – design
- Russ Harrington – photography

== Critical reception ==
Professional ratings
Review scores
Source	Rating
AllMusic	3/5 stars
Cross Rhythms	8/10 stars

Rodney Batdorf of AllMusic wrote "Although it might not be as ambitious as some of her other '90s records, 'Artist of My Soul' is a typically fine record from Sandi Patty that expertly showcases her smooth voice, her easy way with a melody, and her boundless spiritual faith."

Mike Rimmer of Cross Rhythms rated Artist of My Soul 8 out of 10 writing that the album is "definitely inspiring, well produced with some excellent songs and if you like your pop music easy on the ear, this is for you." Rimmer also pointed out that the "poppy gospel flavourings of 'You Alone' and the gentle wonder of 'Speechless' are high points."

== Charts ==
Chart (1997)	Peak position
US Billboard 200 (Billboard)	155
US Top Christian Albums (Billboard)	7
US Top Heatseekers Albums (Billboard)	3

=== Radio singles ===
Year	Singles	Peak positions
Year	Singles	CCM AC
1997	"Breathe on Me"	15

== Accolades ==
GMA Dove Awards

Year	Winner	Category
1998	Artist of My Soul	Inspirational Album of the Year
