= Love Has a Name (Kathy Troccoli album) =

Studio album by Kathy Troccoli
- Released: October 24, 2000
- Studio: House of Big, Dark Horse Studio and Bridgeway Studios (Franklin, Tennessee); Notes-On Studios (New York City, New York)
- Genre: CCM, Christian pop, inspirational
- Length: 44:39
- Label: Reunion
- Producer: Christopher Harris; Mark Baldwin; Tony McAnany

Kathy Troccoli chronology
A Sentimental Christmas (1999)	Love Has a Name (2000)	The Heart of Me (2002)

Professional ratings
Review scores
Source	Rating
AllMusic	3/5 stars
Cross Rhythms	4/10 stars

Love Has a Name is the eleventh studio album by Christian singer-songwriter Kathy Troccoli. It was released on October 24, 2000, by Reunion Records. After the releases of her collaboration with fellow Christian singer Sandi Patty on the pop standards album Together and A Sentimental Christmas, both came out in 1999, Troccoli returned to Christian music, that also includes a cover of Foreigner's 1985 number-one hit "I Want to Know What Love Is". Love Has a Name peaked at number 36 on the Top Christian Albums chart and number 43 on the Heatseekers Albums chart in Billboard magazine.

== Track listing ==
No.	Title	Writer(s)	Producer(s)	Length
1.	"Parade"	Kathy Troccoli, Jeff Franzel, Rick Witkowski	Christopher Harris	4:36
2.	"All Is Well"	K. Troccoli, Scott Krippayne, Steve Siler	C. Harris	4:29
3.	"On My Way to You"	K. Troccoli, J. Franzel	Mark Baldwin	4:26
4.	"Live for the Lord"	K. Troccoli, J. Franzel	C. Harris	4:35
5.	"Break My Heart"	K. Troccoli, J. Franzel, R. Witkowski	Tony McAnany	4:36
6.	"God Said It"	K. Troccoli, J. Franzel	M. Baldwin	4:36
7.	"Hold Me While I Sleep"	K. Troccoli, J. Franzel, Delilah Ortega	T. McAnany	4:10
8.	"Count On Me"	K. Troccoli, J. Franzel, R. Witkowski	C. Harris	5:12
9.	"I Want to Know What Love Is"	Mick Jones	M. Baldwin	4:45
10.	"Love Has a Name"	K. Troccoli, Tom Booth	T. McAnany	4:24

== Personnel ==
- Kathy Troccoli – vocals
- Kent Hooper – keyboards (1, 2, 4, 8), programming (1, 2, 4, 8)
- Jeff Roach – additional keyboards (1, 2, 4, 8), organ (1, 2, 4, 8)
- Blair Masters – keyboards (3, 6, 9), programming (3, 6, 9)
- Gary Burnette – guitars (1, 2, 4, 8)
- David Cleveland – guitars (1, 2, 4, 8)
- Mark Baldwin – guitars (3, 6, 9)
- Nick Moroch – guitars (5, 7, 10)
- Chris Kent – bass (1, 2, 4, 8)
- Jackie Street – bass (3, 6, 9)
- Steve Brewster – drums (1, 2, 4, 8)
- John Hammond – drums (3, 6, 9), programming (3, 6, 9)
- Ken Lewis – percussion (1, 2, 4, 8)
- Eric Darken – percussion (3, 6, 9)
- Mark Douthit – horns (1)
- Chris McDonald – horns (1)
- Jeff Bailey – horns (1)
- Mike Haynes – horns (1)
- Lisa Cochran – backing vocals (1–4, 6, 9)
- Tim Davis – backing vocals (1, 2, 4)
- Chris Harris – backing vocals (1, 2, 4)
- Marabeth Jordan – backing vocals (1, 2, 4)
- Gary Pigg – backing vocals (1, 8)
- Chance Scoggins – backing vocals (3, 6, 9)
- Terry White – backing vocals (3, 6, 9)
- Issac Clemon – backing vocals (5)
- Dennis Collins – backing vocals (5, 7, 10)
- Kevin Owens – backing vocals (5)
- Fonzi Thornton – backing vocals (5, 7, 10), BGV arrangements and contractor (5, 7, 10)
- Katreese Barnes – backing vocals (7, 10)
- Robin Clark – backing vocals (7)
- Melonie Daniels – backing vocals (7)
- Vaneese Thomas – backing vocals (7)
- Ashley Anderson – backing vocals (8)
- Shannon Bellflower – backing vocals (8)
- Anna Flautt – backing vocals (8)
- Brandon Harris – backing vocals (8)
- Shauntea McClish – backing vocals (8)
- Tiah Mustin – backing vocals (8)
- Todd Mustin – backing vocals (8)
- Gabe Pigg – backing vocals (8)
- Landon Pigg – backing vocals (8)

Choir on "I Want to Know What Love Is"

- Darwin Hobbs, Tiffany Palmer, Angela Primm, Jerard Woods and Jovaun Woods

=== Production and Technical ===
- Matt Baugher – executive producer
- Dean Diehl – executive producer
- George King – executive producer
- David Hentschel – co-producer (5)
- David Mann – co-producer (7)
- Tom Salta – co-producer (10)
- Kent Hooper – recording (1, 2, 4, 8)
- Todd Robbins – recording (1, 2, 4, 8)
- John Jaszcz – recording (3, 6, 9)
- Mark Baldwin – tracking (3, 6, 9)
- Roy Hendrickson – recording (5, 7), mixing (5, 7)
- Tim Odell – assistant engineer (1, 2, 4, 8)
- Tom Laune – mixing (1, 2, 4, 8)
- Grant Greene – mixing (3, 6, 9)
- Lynn Fuston – mastering (1–4, 6, 8, 9), lead vocal recording (5, 7, 10)
- Vlado Meller – mastering (5, 7, 10)
- 3D Audio (Franklin, Tennessee) and Sony Music Studios (New York City, New York) – mastering locations
- Chad Dickerson – A&R
- Stephanie McBrayer – production coordinator
- Scott Hughes – art direction
- Tim Parker – design
- Russ Harrington – photography

== Charts ==
Chart (2000)	Peak position
US Top Contemporary Christian (Billboard)	36
US Heatseekers Albums Chart (Billboard)	43

=== Radio singles ===
Year	Singles	Peak positions
Year	Singles	CCM AC
2000	"Parade"	8
