= Stubborn Love (album) =

1982 studio album by Kathy Troccoli

Studio album by Kathy Troccoli
- Released: 1982
- Studio: The Bennett House (Franklin, Tennessee); Great Circle Sound and House of David (Nashville, Tennessee); Pinebrook Studios (Alexandria, Indiana)
- Genre: CCM, Gospel
- Length: 40:56
- Label: Reunion
- Producer: Brown Bannister

Kathy Troccoli chronology
Stubborn Love (1982)	Heart and Soul (1984)

Alternative cover
- 1994 Reunion Records re-issue on CD.

Professional ratings
Review scores
Source	Rating
AllMusic	3/5 stars

Stubborn Love is the debut studio album by American Christian singer/songwriter Kathy Troccoli, released in 1982 on Reunion Records. Stubborn Love was reportedly the best-selling debut album by a contemporary Christian music female artist. The title song was a hit on Christian radio reaching number two on the Christian AC chart. The album also features her cover of "You're All I Need to Get By" written by Ashford and Simpson, made famous in 1968 by Marvin Gaye and Tammi Terrell but with Christian lyrics. Stubborn Love was re-issued on CD in 1994 with a new album cover with an updated photo of Troccoli. The album peaked at number 26 on the Billboard Inspirational Albums chart in 1983.

== Track listing ==
No.	Title	Writer(s)	Length
1.	"You're All I Need to Get By"	Nickolas Ashford, Valerie Simpson	4:02
2.	"Hand in Hand"	Gary Chapman, Michael W. Smith	3:40
3.	"All I Must Do"	Brown Bannister, Mike Blanton	3:47
4.	"It's the Small Things"	Donna McLaughlin Wyant, Michael W. Smith	3:20
5.	"Lord I Need You Now"	Billy Sprague, Jim Weber	4:03
6.	"There's Still Time"	Debbie D. Smith, Michael W. Smith	3:42
7.	"Once in a Lifetime Love"	Gary Dunham, Rosemary Dunham, Michael W. Smith	4:44
8.	"Stubborn Love"	Amy Grant, Gary Chapman, Michael W. Smith, Brown Bannister, Sloan Towner	4:29
9.	"It's Your Love"	Billy Sprague, Jim Weber	4:22
10.	"Love of My Life"	Tricia Walker	3:57

== Personnel ==
- Kathy Troccoli – vocals
- Shane Keister – synthesizers, keyboards (5)
- Michael W. Smith – keyboards (5)
- Gerrit Wilson – keyboards (5)
- Jon Goin – guitars
- Dann Huff – guitars
- Mike Brignardello – bass (1–4, 6–10)
- Craig Nelson – bass (5)
- Keith Edwards – drums
- Mark Morris – percussion
- Denis Solee – saxophone
- Cindy Reynolds – harp
- Alan Moore – string arrangements
- Diana DeWitt, Kim Flemming, Greg Guidry, Sandy Guidry, Denny Henson, Donna McElroy – vocals

=== Production ===
- Michael Blanton – executive producer
- Dan Harrell – executive producer
- Brown Bannister – producer
- Gene Eichelberger – engineer
- Bob Clark – additional overdub engineer
- Dennis Hill – album design
- Mike Borum – front album photography
- Wade Jaynes – back album photography
- Mark Pleasant – back album photography

== Charts ==
Chart (1983)	Peak position
US Inspirational Albums (Billboard)	26

=== Radio singles ===
Year	Singles	Peak positions
Year	Singles	CCM AC
1982-83	"Stubborn Love"	2
