= Images (Kathy Troccoli album) =

Studio album by Kathy Troccoli
- Released: 1986
- Studio: Gold Mine Studio East (Brentwood, Tennessee); Gold Mine Studio West (Beverly Hills, California); MCA Whitney Recording Studios (Glendale, California); The Complex (Los Angeles, California); Conway Studios (Hollywood, California)
- Genre: Inspirational Music
- Length: 43:20
- Label: Reunion
- Producer: Dann Huff; Phil Naish

Kathy Troccoli chronology
Heart and Soul (1984)	Images (1986)	Pure Attraction (1991)

Professional ratings
Review scores
Source	Rating
AllMusic	2.5/5 stars

Images is the third full-length studio album by Christian singer/songwriter Kathy Troccoli, released in 1986 on Reunion Records. It did not sell as well as her previous two albums. Despite that, Images still earned Troccoli a Grammy nomination for Best Gospel Performance, Female at the 30th Grammy Awards in 1988. After the release of Images, Troccoli embarked on a five-year sabbatical from her recording career and would not release another album until 1991's Pure Attraction. Images peaked at No. 25 on the Billboard Top Inspirational Albums chart.

== Track listing ==
1. "Ready and Willing" (Wayne Kirkpatrick, Dann Huff, Phil Naish) – 5:45
2. "Talk It Out" (Kathy Troccoli, Naish, Kirkpatrick) – 4:36
3. "Dream On" (Troccoli, Naish, Kirkpatrick, Huff) – 5:32
4. "Don't Wanna See You Down" (Troccoli, Pam Mark Hall, Naish) – 4:16
5. "Chance of a Lifetime" (Kirkpatrick, Huff, Naish) – 4:18
6. "Love Stays" (Troccoli, Mark Baldwin) – 5:14
7. "No Time for Love" (Troccoli, Kirkpatrick, Naish) – 4:04
8. "If Only" (Troccoli, Jack Fowler) – 3:43
9. "Gotta Keep Dancin'" (Troccoli, Naish, Kirkpatrick) – 5:15

== Personnel ==
- Kathy Troccoli – vocals, backing vocals (9)
- Phil Naish – keyboards
- Dann Huff – guitars (1–7, 9)
- Mike Brignardello – bass (1, 9), fretless bass (9)
- Neil Stubenhaus – bass (2, 4, 6, 7)
- Gary Lunn – fretless bass (3)
- David Huff – drum programming (1, 9), drums (5, 7)
- Paul Leim – drums (2, 6), drum programming (3)
- John Robinson – drums (4)
- Paulinho da Costa – percussion (4)
- Lisa Bevill – backing vocals (1, 3)
- Chris Eaton – backing vocals (3, 5)
- Gary Janney – backing vocals (4, 9)

Production

- Michael Blanton – executive producer
- Dan Harrell – executive producer
- Dann Huff – producer
- Phil Naish – producer
- Jeff Balding – recording, mixing (2, 4, 8, 9)
- Csaba Petocz – recording, mixing (1, 3, 5, 6)
- Spencer Chrislu – additional engineer
- David Pierce – additional engineer
- Dave Cline – overdub engineer
- Dan Garcia – overdub engineer
- Bill Brunt – art direction
- Scott Bonner – photography
- Ron Keith – photography

== Charts ==
Chart (1986)	Peak position
US Inspirational Albums (Billboard)	25

=== Radio singles ===
Year	Singles	Peak positions	
Year	Singles	CCM AC	CCM CHR
1986	"Talk It Out"	26	5
1987	"If Only"	29	—
