= Kathy Troccoli (album) =

Studio album by Kathy Troccoli
- Released: June 28, 1994
- Studio: The Bennett House and Tejas Recorders (Franklin, Tennessee); Javelina Studios and Secret Sound (Nashville, Tennessee); Manzanita Recording (Arrington, Tennessee); Rumbo Recorders and Andora Studios (Los Angeles, California); Cornerstone Studios (Chatsworth, California); Cove City Sound Studios (Long Island, New York); The Dream Factory (New York City, New York)
- Genre: Pop; CCM; R&B
- Length: 42:27
- Label: Reunion; RCA
- Producer: Peter Bunetta; Rick Chudacoff; Michael Omartian; Keith Thomas; Ric Wake

Kathy Troccoli chronology
Pure Attraction (1991)	Kathy Troccoli (1994)	Sounds of Heaven (1995)

Singles from Kathy Trocclli
- 1. "Tell Me Where It Hurts" Released: 1994; 2. "If I'm Not in Love" Released: 1994

Professional ratings
Review scores
Source	Rating
AllMusic	4.5/5 stars

Kathy Troccoli is the self-titled fifth full-length album from singer-songwriter Kathy Troccoli. It was released by Reunion Records in 1994. The lead single was Diane Warren's "Tell Me Where It Hurts". The songs "My Life Is In Your Hands" and "Mission of Love" were top ten Christian radio hits. In 1995, Troccoli was nominated for Female Vocalist of the Year and for Song of the Year for the track "My Life Is in Your Hands", which she co-wrote with Bill Montvilo, at the 25th GMA Dove Awards. The album peaked at number ten on the Billboard Top Christian Albums chart.

== Track listing ==
1. "Just You" (Troccoli, Bill Montvilo) - 4:33
2. "Tell Me Where It Hurts" (Diane Warren) - 4:03
3. "If I'm Not in Love" (Dawn Thomas) - 3:47
4. "I'll Be There (For You)" (Klarmann/Weber, Troccoli) - 4:36
5. "All of My Life" (Omartian, Troccoli) - 4:30
6. "Takin' a Chance" (Whitney Houston, Keith Thomas, BeBe Winans) - 3:38
7. "Mission of Love" (Christian James, George McFarlane, Ray St. John, Troccoli) - 4:35
8. "Never My Love" (Addrisi Brothers) - 4:12
9. "Fallin'" (Omartian, Troccoli) - 4:11
10. "My Life Is in Your Hands" (Montvilo, Troccoli) - 4:35

== Personnel ==
- Kathy Troccoli – vocals
- Brad Cole – keyboards (1, 8)
- Keith Thomas – synthesizers (2), bass programming (2), drums (2), percussion (2)
- Robbie Buchanan – keyboards (3)
- Michael Omartian – keyboards (4, 5, 7, 9, 10), programming (4, 5, 7, 9, 10), backing vocals (4, 7, 9)
- Rich Tancredi – keyboards (6)
- Freddie Fox – guitars (1)
- Dann Huff – guitars (2, 4, 7)
- Bob Mann – guitars (3, 8)
- Jerry McPherson – guitars (4, 9, 10)
- Vail Johnson – bass (3)
- Mark Hammond – drums (2), percussion (2)
- Matt Noble – drums (2), percussion (2)
- John Robinson – drums (3)
- Chester Thompson – drums (5, 10)
- Joey Franco – drums (6)
- Richie Jones – drums (6)
- Andy Snitzer – saxophone (6)
- Warren Hill – soprano saxophone (8)
- Mark Douthit – saxophone (9)
- Orion Crawford – orchestration (3)
- The Nashville String Machine – orchestra (3, 5, 10)
- Carl Gorodetzky – concertmaster (3, 5, 10)
- Ellis Hall – backing vocals (1, 8)
- Maxayn Lewis – backing vocals (1, 8)
- Syreeta Wright – backing vocals (1, 8)
- Ada Dyer – backing vocals (2)
- Judson Spence – backing vocals (2)
- Audrey Wheeler – backing vocals (2)
- Ashley Cleveland – backing vocals (4, 7, 9)
- Donna McElroy – backing vocals (4, 7, 9)
- Michael Mellett – backing vocals (4, 7, 9)
- Terri Jones – backing vocals (6)
- Earl Robinson – backing vocals (6)
- Eddie Stockley – backing vocals (6)

Music arrangements

- Brad Cole – arrangements (1, 8)
- Michael Omartian – arrangements (4, 5, 7, 9, 10)
- Rich Tancredi – arrangements (6)
- Ric Wake – arrangements (6)
- Peter Bunetta – arrangements (8)
- Rick Chudacoff – arrangements (8)

Production

- Michael Blanton – executive producer, A&R
- Joe Galante – executive producer
- Dave Novik – A&R
- Peter Bunetta – producer (1, 3, 8)
- Rick Chudacoff – producer (1, 3, 8)
- Keith Thomas – producer (2)
- Michael Omartian – producer (4, 5, 7, 9, 10)
- Ric Wake – producer (6)
- Leon Johnson – recording (1, 8)
- Bill Whittington – recording (2), mixing (2)
- Daren Klein – recording (3)
- Terry Christian – engineer (4, 5, 7, 9, 10)
- Bob Cadway – recording (6)
- Mick Guzauski – mixing (1, 3–5, 7–10)
- Rick Kerr – mixing (6)
- Eric Rudd – additional engineer (1, 3, 8)
- James Brick – additional engineer (2), assistant engineer (3)
- Jim Dineen – additional engineer (4, 5, 7, 9, 10)
- Tom Yezzi – additional engineer (6)
- Terry Bates – assistant engineer (1, 3, 8)
- Eric Stitt Greedy – assistant engineer (1, 3, 8)
- Andy Udoff – assistant engineer (1, 8)
- Greg Parker – assistant engineer (2)
- Scott Link – assistant engineer (4, 5, 7, 9, 10)
- Doug McGuirk – assistant engineer (6)
- David Shackney – assistant engineer (6)
- Todd Moore – production coordinator (2, 3)
- Susan Martinez – production coordinator (4, 5, 7, 9, 10)
- Don Donahue – A&R liaison
- Ria Lewerke – art direction
- DesignArt, Inc. – design
- Dorothy Low – photography
- Cindy Dupree – management

== Charts ==
Chart (1994)	Peak position
US Top Christian Albums (Billboard)	10

=== Radio singles ===
Year	Singles	Peak positions			
Year	Singles	CCM AC	CCM CHR	US Hot 100	US AC
1994	"Tell Me Where It Hurts"	—	—	88	16
1994	"My Life Is in Your Hands"	1	24	—	—
1994	"Mission of Love"	4	2	—	—
1994	"If I'm Not in Love"	—	—	—	22
1995	"I'll Be There (For You)"	—	2	—	—
