= Love & Mercy (album) =

Studio album by Kathy Troccoli
- Released: April 29, 1997
- Studio: Quad Studio and OmniSound Studios (Nashville, Tennessee); Gaither Studios (Alexandria, Indiana); Castle Oaks Studios (Calabasas, California); Integrity Music Studios (Calumet City, Illinois)
- Genre: CCM, Christian pop, inspirational
- Length: 42:24
- Label: Reunion
- Producer: Peter Bunetta; Rick Chudacoff

Kathy Troccoli chronology
| Sounds of Heaven (1995) | Love & Mercy (1997) | Corner of Eden (1998) |

Professional ratings
Review scores
| Source | Rating |
|---|---|
| AllMusic | 4/5 stars |
| Cross Rhythms | 8/10 stars |

Love & Mercy is the seventh studio album by Christian singer-songwriter Kathy Troccoli. It was released on April 29, 1997, on Reunion Records. The lead single "Love One Another" features Troccoli and 40 plus Christian artists like Amy Grant, Sandi Patty, Michael W. Smith and Carman. The song was released commercially as a CD single on March 18, 1997, to Christian retail stores in advance of the album's release and the single's proceeds went to His Touch Ministries in Houston, Texas, which is a non-profit organization that was established to educate the church, provide support groups for HIV victims, create teams to visit AIDS patients and provide housing for men, women and children suffering from the illness. The album's third single "A Baby's Prayer" is a pro-life song that Troccoli and Scott Brasher wrote that explores the abortion issue from the perspective of an unborn child. "A Baby's Prayer" would give Troccoli her first two Dove Award wins for Inspirational Song of the Year (one as artist, the other as writer, shared with co-writer Brasher) at the 29th GMA Dove Awards. Love & Mercy reached number 7 on the Top Christian Albums, number 6 on the Heatseekers Albums and number 170 on the Top 200 Albums charts in Billboard magazine, giving Troccoli her first crossover chart appearance on the latter.

== Track listing ==
1. "I Call Him Love" (Ty Lacy, Kevin Stokes, Joanna Carlson) - 4:07
2. "Water into Wine" (Grant Cunningham, Matt Huesmann) - 3:38
3. "Love One Another" (Kathy Troccoli, Bill Cuomo, Robert White Johnson) - 5:47
4. "How Would I Know" (Jackie Gouché-Ferris) - 5:01
5. "A Baby's Prayer" (Troccoli, Scott Brasher) - 3:49
6. "He'll Never Leave Me" (Dawn Thomas) - 5:25
7. "All Glory to God" (Troccoli, Cuomo, Johnson) - 3:55
8. "Faithful to Me" (Troccoli) - 3:57
9. "Call Out to Me" (Diane Warren) - 3:51
10. "Help Me God" (Allen Shamblin, Madeline Stone) - 2:51

== Personnel ==
- Kathy Troccoli – vocals
- Robbie Buchanan – keyboards (1, 3, 6, 7)
- Michael Eckhart – programming (2, 9)
- Dane Noel – programming (2, 9)
- Brad Cole – acoustic piano (4), programming (4), additional keyboards (6, 10)
- Scott Brasher – keyboard programming (5, 8), arrangements (5), string programming (8)
- Bill Elliott – acoustic piano (8, 10)
- Michael Thompson – electric guitars (1, 7), guitars (3, 6, 9)
- Monty Byrom – acoustic guitars (2, 7)
- Vail Johnson – bass (1, 3, 6, 7)
- John Robinson – drums (1, 3, 6, 7)
- Tony Morra – drum programming (2)
- Evan Stone – drum programming (9)
- Lenny Castro – percussion (1, 3, 6, 7)
- Jackie Gouché-Farris – backing vocals (1–4, 6, 7, 9)
- Charlotte Gibson – backing vocals (1, 7)
- Ellis Hall – backing vocals (1–4, 6, 7, 9)
- Amy Keys – backing vocals (2–4, 6, 9)

Special guest vocals on "Love One Another"

- Aaron Jeoffrey
- Tai Anderson (of Third Day)
- Carolyn Arends
- Susan Ashton
- Audio Adrenaline
- Lisa Bevill
- Beyond the Blue
- Carman
- Gary Chapman
- Christafari
- Beverly Crawford
- Clay Crosse
- First Call
- 4Him
- Billy and Sarah Gaines
- Vestal Goodman
- Amy Grant
- Sarah Hart
- Jackson Finch
- Sarah Jahn
- Phil Joel
- Scott Krippayne
- Greg Long
- Mark Lowry
- Sarah Masen
- Babbie Mason
- Out of the Grey
- Janet Paschal
- Sandi Patty
- Peter Penrose
- Phillips, Craig & Dean
- Jonathan Pierce
- Reality Check
- Sierra
- Kevin Max Smith
- Michael W. Smith
- Tim Taber
- Paul Vann
- Jaci Velasquez
- Tony Vincent

== Production ==
- Peter Bunetta – producer
- Rick Chudacoff – producer
- Leon Johnson – recording
- Eric Rudd – additional recording
- Chuck Harris – 4Him vocal recording (3)
- Jeff Wood – Sandi Patty vocal recording (3)
- June Murakawa – assistant engineer
- Glenn Spinner – assistant engineer
- Eric Sarafin – mixing at O'Henry Sound Studios (Burbank, California) and The Village Recorder (Los Angeles, California)
- Eric Greedy – mix assistant
- Brett Swain – mix assistant
- Brian Young – mix assistant
- Dave Collins – mastering at A&M Mastering Studios (Hollywood, California)
- Diana Lussenden – art direction
- Russ Harrington – photography

== Charts ==
| Chart (1997) | Peak position |
|---|---|
| US Top Christian Albums (Billboard) | 7 |
| US Top Heatseekers Albums (Billboard) | 6 |
| US Top 200 Albums (Billboard) | 170 |

=== Radio singles ===
| Year | Singles | Peak positions | | |
| Year | Singles | CCM AC | CCM CHR | US AC |
|---|---|---|---|---|
| 1997 | "Love One Another" | 1 | 12 | — |
| 1997 | "He'll Never Leave Me" | — | — | 27 |
| 1997 | "I Call Him Love" | 4 | — | — |
| 1997 | "A Baby's Prayer" | 9 | — | — |
| 1998 | "All Glory to God" | 4 | — | — |
| 1998 | "Water into Wine" | 40 | — | — |

== Accolades ==
GMA Dove Awards

| Year | Winner | Category |
|---|---|---|
| 1998 | "A Baby's Prayer" | Inspirational Song of the Year |
