= Cartoons (Chris Rice song) =

1998 song by Chris Rice

Song by Chris Rice

from the album Live By Faith
- Released: September 15, 1998
- Genre: Contemporary Christian music
- Length: 3:36
- Label: Rocketown Records
- Songwriter: Chris Rice

"Cartoons" (also popularly known as "The Cartoon Song") is a contemporary Christian novelty song by singer-songwriter Chris Rice. The song humorously imagines popular secular cartoon characters becoming Christians and singing praise with their own distinct variations of "hallelujah".

Originating as a tongue-in-cheek comedic skit satirizing the Christian tendency to adapt popular culture, "Cartoons" gained significant popularity in the contemporary Christian music scene after its release on albums and to radio. The song also raised controversy in equal measure, with criticism aimed at its theological implications as well as the prominent references to secular media. Rice, who never intended for the song to become popular, removed "Cartoons" from his live setlist in 2004.

== Background ==
The earliest version of the song was performed in 1989. Written quickly for a junior high youth group at a small church, the song was meant to illustrate "that it's weird how we [Christians] try to make Christian versions of everything", using popular cartoons as an example. The comedic song was received well by the children and the church congregation at large, leading Rice to add it to his repertoire. At the time, Rice primarily worked as an itinerant speaker/songwriter/musician, appearing at youth conferences and camps nationwide.

== Lyrics ==
The lyrics imagine if popular animated cartoon characters "got saved", suggesting they would go on to sing praise using their own versions of the word hallelujah.

Over a dozen cartoon characters, selected from those popular in the United States from the 1960s through the 1990s, are mentioned over the course of the song. Their "hallelujah" variations generally take the form of either a portmanteau with the character's catchphrase (such as the Teenage Mutant Ninja Turtles exclaiming "cowabunga-lujah, dude!") or an impression of their voice and speech patterns (such as Elmer Fudd pronouncing it as "hawewoojah"). An exception is Beavis and Butt-Head—referred to euphemistically as "Beavis and that other guy"—who dismissively remark "nah" (a buzzer sound in some recordings) rather than joining in praise.

The following cartoon characters are mentioned in the song, despite the fact that Kermit the Frog doesn't originate from an animated cartoon series and The Smurfs are an animated adaptation of a comic series:

- Fred Flintstone and Wilma Flintstone
- Scooby-Doo and Shaggy
- Astro the dog
- Teenage Mutant Ninja Turtles
- Kermit the Frog
- Elmer Fudd
- Rocky Squirrel and Bullwinkle J. Moose
- Yogi Bear
- All those little blue guys
- Beavis and that other guy

The song concludes that ultimately cartoon characters "weren't made" to praise God, something that is the responsibility of Christians, ending with a call and response of singing "hallelujah".

== Release ==
"Cartoons" was first released on Rice's self-released album Live By Faith. This version of the song included samples from several of the mentioned cartoons.

After Rice joined Rocketown Records, the label became aware of the song's popularity and insisted he re-record it for an album. Despite initial resistance, Rice acquiesced on the condition that the song would be a hidden track. "Cartoons" was therefore included after the final track on the CD version of the 1998 album Past The Edges, unmentioned in the liner notes or track listing.

A live version of "Cartoons", performed at the Universal CityWalk Orlando Hard Rock Cafe, was recorded for the compilation live album A Night at Rocketown. This version of "Cartoons" was re-released on the compilation album WOW 2000 and on Rice's 2004 compilation album Short Term Memories.

== Charts ==
Chart (2005)	Peak position
Hot Christian Songs (Billboard)	39
Christian Airplay (Billboard)	35

== Reception ==
I couldn't understand such a silly song getting such scrutiny. Also, in correcting my "theology" in the cartoon song, people were totally missing the fact that the whole song is about soul-less cartoons, none of whom can "get saved". But theology was never the intention of the song, just a funny look at how cartoons might say "Hallelujah".

— Chris Rice, F.A.Q., chrisrice.com

Despite its initial limited presence as a hidden song, "Cartoons" went on to achieve outsize popularity in Christian media markets. "Cartoons" spent six weeks on the Christian Airplay top 40 charts in 2005, over five years after its first release. Rice claimed that Christian radio DJs were informing him that "Cartoons" was their station's most-requested song as late as 2007, even sharing an anecdote of one station advertising "No Cartoons Tuesday" to stop requests for the song once a week.

"Cartoons" received outspoken criticism on a theological basis. Many objected to the combination of frivolous subject matter with religious worship, with some even considering that the alterations to "hallelujah" amounted to sacrilege. Particular ire was leveled at the reference to Beavis and Butt-Head (which Rice had intended as a satire of Christian objections to the show), with critics variously arguing that the song promoted a view that certain people were not worth saving or simply that such a show should not be alluded to in a Christian song. This song has also led to a boycott by Bible Belt Conservatives and some fans of Chris Rice's music.

In addition to surprise at the theologically-driven reactions, Rice expressed chagrin that the outsize popularity of the song led many to pigeonhole him as a children's musician. Reflecting that he had "never intended for such a silly song to be made popular", Rice ceased performing "Cartoons" live in November 2004.
