= Kathy Troccoli =

American singer (born 1964)

- Born: June 24, 1958 (age 68); Brooklyn, New York, U.S.
- Genres: Contemporary Christian, inspirational, jazz, pop music
- Occupations: Singer, songwriter, author, speaker
- Years active: 1982–present
- Labels: Reunion, RCA, Green Hill Productions, KT Records, Soar Records, Corner of Eden Music

Kathleen Troccoli (/trəˈkoʊlɪ/; born June 24, 1958) is an American contemporary Christian music singer, songwriter, author, and speaker.

== Early life and family ==
Born in Brooklyn, New York, Troccoli was raised in Islip Terrace, Long Island, New York, where she graduated from East Islip High School. Her father died of colon cancer when she was 15; her mother died of breast cancer in 1991, shortly before the release of her album Pure Attraction and its mainstream chart selection, "Everything Changes".

Troccoli was raised in a Catholic family, which was not particularly religious. As of 1998, she was a practicing Catholic, but currently identifies as a non-denominational Christian. As of 2020, she continues to sing, speak and minister to the Church worldwide.

== Musical career ==
After graduating from high school, Troccoli studied jazz and opera at the Berklee College of Music in Boston for a year, then returned to Long Island to major in voice at Suffolk County Community College (SCCC) also singing with a SCCC-based jazz band and later singing in Long Island clubs. In the summer of 1978, while working a job to help cover her college expenses, Troccoli formed a friendship with a born again Christian co-worker; this led to Troccoli herself becoming a devout Christian. Troccoli's alto voice gained prominence when she opened for Ed Nalle's group, GLAD, when the group performed at the Long Island church Troccoli attended in 1980. Approximately six months afterwards, Nalle invited Troccoli to record a demo tape, with his band's backing, and Kathy accepted. After she and GLAD had recorded it, the tape was submitted to Michael Blanton and Dan Harrell (Amy Grant's brother-in-law); these two, as a result of hearing it, formed the Reunion Records label, in Nashville, specifically to record Troccoli, and Kathy herself, in turn, moved to Nashville to reside with Harrell and his family.

Troccoli's debut album, the 1982 release Stubborn Love, was reportedly the best-selling debut album by a contemporary Christian music female artist. A second album, Heart and Soul, was released in 1984; it led to her receiving her first Grammy nomination a year later, in 1986, in which year Images followed it (earning her another Grammy nomination). Troccoli then withdrew from her musical career returning to Long Island for a five-year sojourn, giving singing lessons and singing at weddings. In 1989, Troccoli was prominently featured on the selection "I'll Be Your Shelter", a Diane Warren-penned song which Taylor Dayne recorded for her album Can't Fight Fate. "I'll Be Your Shelter" became a Top Ten single in 1990.

After her mother's death, Troccoli returned to the Reunion Records label in 1991 for her secular album debut, Pure Attraction, whose lead single, "Everything Changes", Warren had written and composed for Taylor Dayne. Dayne had turned the selection down, however, and Joe Galante, then president of RCA Records, through which Reunion releases were distributed, offered it to Troccoli, who recalled: "He played it, and I knew I could own it. This was something I wanted to say." Peaking at No. 14 on the Hot 100 in Billboard, "Everything Changes", reached No. 1 on the CCM CHR. Chart and also charted on the magazine's Adult Contemporary chart reaching No. 6. "Help Myself To You" became Troccoli's first No. 1 hit in her ten-year career, and began a string of GMA Music Awards nominations, including numerous attempts at Female Vocalist.

Numerous hit songs came afterwards, including 1994's "My Life is in Your Hands", jointly written and composed with Bill Montvilo, which defined her career and inspired the devotional book of the same title, written in 1997, and 1995's "Go Light Your World", which began the rise of writer Chris Rice and was used for charity efforts that year.

In 1996, Troccoli was featured on the Beach Boys' now out-of-print album Stars and Stripes Vol. 1, singing lead vocals on a cover of their 1969 song "I Can Hear Music", itself a cover of a Phil Spector song. The Beach Boys sing on the track as well, providing harmonies and backing vocals.

== Media appearances ==
Over the years, Kathy has appeared on The Tonight Show, Live with Regis and Kathie Lee, The 700 Club, Entertainment Tonight, among others. She also appeared on Focus on the Family's video for teens, Sex, Lies, & The Truth and has also been a regular co-host of the TV show "Red Letter Christians" with Tony Campolo. In 2010, she co-hosted a one-hour television program called The Mark and Kathy Show with Mark Lowry, on The Inspiration Network (later called INSP).

== Discography ==
- 1982: Stubborn Love
- 1984: Heart and Soul
- 1986: Images
- 1988: Portfolio (compilation album)
- 1991: Pure Attraction
- 1994: Kathy Troccoli
- 1995: Sounds of Heaven
- 1997: Love & Mercy
- 1998: Corner of Eden
- 1999: Together (with Sandi Patty)
- 1999: A Sentimental Christmas
- 2000: Love Has a Name
- 2002: The Heart of Me
- 2003: Greatest Hits
- 2004: K.T.'s Groovin' Medleys (children's album)
- 2005: Draw Me Close: Songs of Worship
- 2005: Comfort
- 2006: The Story of Love
- 2008: Hope's Alive
- 2010: Heartsongs (covers album)
- 2011: Christmas Songs
- 2012: 30 Years/Songs: The Kathy Troccoli Collection (compilation album)
- 2013: Worshipsongs: 'Tis So Sweet
- 2015: Better Days
- 2023: The Legacy of You (compilation album)

=== Singles ===
- 1983: "Stubborn Love"
- 1984: "I Belong to You"
- 1985: "Holy Holy"
- 1986: "Talk It Out"
- 1987: "If Only"
- 1987: "All the World Should Know" (with Glad)
- 1991: "Love was Never Meant to Die"
- 1992: "Help Myself to You"
- 1992: "Everything Changes"
- 1992: "You've Got a Way"
- 1994: "Tell Me Where It Hurts"
- 1994: "If I'm Not in Love"
- 1994: "Mission of Love"
- 1994: "My Life Is in Your Hands"
- 1995: "Never My Love"
- 1995: "Go Light Your World"
- 1995: "Love One Another"
- 1996: "He'll Never Leave Me"
- 1996: "I Call Him Love"
- 1996: "I Can Hear Music" (with the Beach Boys)
- 1996: "A Baby's Prayer"
- 1999: "I Remember"
- 2010: "What a Wonderful World"
- 2011: "Missing You This Christmas"
- 2013: "Somewhere Over the Rainbow (with Sandi Patty)"
- 2022: "Blackbird"
- 2022: "My Saviour Singing"
- 2022: "Your Smile"
- 2022: "Finally Free"
- 2022: "Let the Good Things Grow"
- 2023: "Heaven Knows"
- 2023: "Romancing My Soul"
- 2023: "Be the One"
- 2023: "The Legacy of You"
- 2023: "Eyes On Me"
- 2024: "I Do"
- 2024: "I Surrender"
- 2024: "Each Moment"
- 2024: "Like You (The Potter's Hand)"
- 2025: "Simply Jesus (with Leigh Cappillino of Point of Grace)"

== GMA Dove Awards ==
- 1998: Inspirational Recorded Song, "A Baby's Prayer" (Two awards: one as artist, the other as writer, shared with co-writer Scott Brasher)
- 1999: Inspirational Album of the Year, Corner of Eden

== Books ==
- 1997: My Life Is in Your Hands
- 1999: Different Roads
- 2002: Am I Not Still God?
- 2002: Hope for a Woman's Heart
- 2005: A Love That Won't Walk Away
- 2005: Seven Celebrations for the Soul
- 2006: Live Like You Mean It: Engaging in a Life of Passion, Romance, and Adventure

=== With Dee Brestin ===
- 2001: Falling in Love with Jesus (hardback Bible study)
- 2003: The Colors of His Love (hardback Bible study, softcover version titled Living in Love with Jesus)
- 2004: Forever in Love with Jesus (Bible study)
- 2019: S.P.A.R.K.S. — to ignite your soul (A Devotional)
