= Pure Attraction =

Studio album by Kathy Troccoli
- Released: October 29, 1991
- Studios: Cove City Sound Studios (Glen Cove, Long Island, New York)
- Genres: Pop, contemporary Christian
- Length: 43:01
- Labels: Reunion, Geffen
- Producer: Ric Wake

Kathy Troccoli chronology
Images (1986)	Pure Attraction (1991)	Kathy Troccoli (1994)

Pure Attraction is the fourth full-length album by singer-songwriter Kathy Troccoli, released on October 29, 1991, through Reunion Records. Coming five years after her 1986 album, Images, Pure Attraction saw Troccoli shifting away from Christian music and into mainstream pop territory, with two songs written by Diane Warren. It featured the top five CCM and top twenty pop hit "Everything Changes", and featured seven songs co-written by Troccoli. The album peaked at number 9 on the Billboard Top Christian Albums chart.

== Critical reception ==
Professional ratings
Review scores
Source	Rating
AllMusic	4.5/5 stars
Cross Rhythms	6/10 stars

Brian Mansfield of AllMusic wrote "Troccoli's first recording after a five-year absence was her most commercial, with the Diane Warren-penned 'Everything Changes' hitting Top Five on CHR radio. Troccoli had developed her songwriting during her time away; she wrote seven of Pure Attraction's cuts, emphasizing the torch-song style she loves."

Jonathan Priday of Cross Rhythms criticized Pure Attraction for the vocal-heavy production by Ric Wake who had previously worked with Mariah Carey and Taylor Dayne. Priday wrote that the "result is an imbalance in the tracks which leans too heavily on soulful ballads like 'Love Was Never Meant To Die' and 'You're Still Here.' The quality of [Toccoli's] voice is not in question – it has a richness that makes a pleasant change from the 'little girl' vocals we get plagued with."

== Track listing ==
1. "Everything Changes" (Diane Warren) - 4:25
2. "Help Myself to You" (Troccoli) - 4:14
3. "Love Has Found Me Here" (David Ray, Troccoli, Montvilo) - 4:40
4. "You've Got a Way" (Troccoli, Jeff Frenzel) - 3:55
5. "You're Still Here" (Troccoli, Jack Fowler) - 4:01
6. "Love Was Never Meant to Die" (Troccoli, Frenzel) - 4:47
7. "The Hard Days" (Troccoli, Bill Montvilo) - 4:06
8. "Can't Get You Out My Heart" (Warren) - 4:24
9. "Only Love Can Know" (Troccoli, Ric Wake, Rich Tancredi) - 5:14
10. "You and I" (Stevie Wonder) - 3:16

== Production ==
- Michael Blanton – executive producer
- Terry Hemmings – executive producer
- Cindy Dupree – A&R
- Ric Wake – producer
- Bob Cadway – recording, mixing
- Dan Hetzel – assistant engineer
- Thomas R. Yezzi – assistant engineer
- Stephen Marcussen – mastering at Precision Mastering (Hollywood, California)
- David Barratt – production coordinator
- D.L. Rhodes – art direction
- Buddy Jackson – design
- Diego Uchitel – photography

== Personnel ==
- Kathy Troccoli – vocals, backing vocals
- Rich Tancredi – keyboards, arrangements
- Bob Cadway – guitars
- Al Pitrelli – guitars
- Mark Russell – bass
- Joey Franco – drums
- Jim Hobson – drum and percussion programming
- Richie Cannata – saxophone
- Ric Wake – arrangements
- Mary Davis – backing vocals
- Tony Harnell – backing vocals
- Billy T. Scott – backing vocals
- Tina Stanford – backing vocals
- Joe Lynn Turner – backing vocals
- Brenda White-King – backing vocals

== Remixes ==
- The song "Everything Changes" was remixed by Ric Wake, Larry Robinson and Richie Jones, and re-released as a 12-inch single in 1992. The track listing is as follows:
1. Everything Changes (Extended Hot Mix)
2. Everything Changes (Wake Up The House Mix)
3. Everything Changes (The Underground Dub Mix)
4. Everything Changes (The Underground Mix)
5. Everything Changes (The Underground House Mix)
6. The Hard Days (LP Version)

== Charts ==
Chart (1992)	Peak position
US Top Christian Albums (Billboard)	9

=== Radio singles ===
Year	Singles	Peak positions			
Year	Singles	US	US AC	US Christ AC	US Christ. CHR
1991	"Love Was Never Meant to Die"	—	-	1	8
1992	"Help Myself to You"	—	-	1	1
1992	"Everything Changes"	14	6	5	1
1992	"You've Got a Way"	-	7	7	8
1992	"Love Has Found Me Here"	—	-	9	10
