= Chris Rice =

American musician

- Origin: Clinton, Maryland, U.S.
- Genres: CCM, folk
- Instruments: Vocals, piano, guitar
- Years active: 80's–2007, 2019–2020
- Labels: Rocketown, Eb+Flo, Clumsy Fly
- Website: chrisrice.com

Chris Rice is a former American singer and songwriter who worked in the contemporary Christian music, contemporary folk, adult contemporary and adult album alternative genres. He became a recording artist in 1996 after signing a contract with Rocketown Records and releasing his debut album, Deep Enough to Dream. He released six albums between 1996 and 2007, before entering a 12-year hiatus. In 2019, he ended his hiatus and released a joint album with Andrew Ripp.

In 2020, Rice was accused of sexually assaulting a minor between 1995 and 2003 while leading worship at youth camp retreats for a church. In 2022, an investigation from an independent establishment determined the allegations to be credible. He has not released a statement regarding the allegations and has not been active in music since then.

== Early life and education ==
Chris Rice, a native of Clinton, Maryland, grew up as the second of four sons born to bookstore owners. His parents, and other adult mentors, influenced Rice's Christian faith and his early work with youth and college students.

Having taken only three years of piano lessons as a child, Rice did not aspire to a career in either music or student work. But frequent invitations to speak and lead music at his church's youth group events led to more such invitations throughout his college years at the University of Maryland, Grace College in Winona Lake, Indiana, and Union University in Jackson, Tennessee. He holds a bachelor's degree in Psychology and Communication. While leading music and coaching high school soccer teams he began writing songs. What began as weekend and summer work with youth and college students soon turned into a full-time career during his twenties and thirties, and prompted Rice to write and perform mainly on the guitar.

== Career ==
=== As a songwriter ===
Rice's songwriting career began in the mid-1980s, after moving from his Washington, D.C., home to Nashville, Tenn. During that period several of Rice's songs were recorded by other artists, including Kathy Troccoli and Terri Gibbs. Rice's "Welcome to Our World", an original Christmas song since recorded by Michael W. Smith, Amy Grant and John Tesh, moved Smith to urge his new label, Rocketown Records, to sign Rice as its first artist in 1996.

Rice and MacLeod composed song "By Faith" for Kim Boyce. It was released on Warner Alliance. It was a hit on the CCM chart, peaking at No. 3 for the week of 2 January 1995.

=== Solo artist ===
With the help of Monroe Jones' production skills, Chris Rice recorded Deep Enough to Dream for a September 1997 release. Past the Edges followed a year later. Rice's third album, Smell the Color 9, was issued in late 2000.

In 2001, Rice released two piano-only, instrumental releases, The Living Room Sessions and The Living Room Sessions: Christmas, recorded on Rice's own living room grand piano.

His sixth album, Run the Earth... Watch the Sky, released in March 2003, Chris again joined the production talents of his longtime friend and collaborator Monroe Jones. The album's first single was "The Other Side of the Radio".

These four studio releases (plus the two instrumental releases) fulfilled Rice's contractual commitment to Rocketown and they issued several compilation albums, Short Term Memories and Snapshots: Live and Fan Favorites, following his departure in June 2004 and February 2005 respectively.

=== New record label ===
Rice signed with independent label Eb+Flo Records, and made a marketing and distribution agreement with INO Records who had distribution through Sony/Columbia removed the limitation of catering his music to Christian radio formats.

His fifth studio album, Amusing, released in August 2005. For the first time in his career, Rice released radio singles to AC and Light Rock stations around the country, the first single being a light romantic song entitled "When Did You Fall (In Love With Me?)" which reached No. 8 on the Pop AC radio format and enjoyed Top Ten status throughout the middle of 2006. A second AC hit, "Lemonade", began climbing the AC chart in 2007.

With his success on the AC radio format, Rice released a side project hearkening back to his roots, a vocal hymns album, Peace Like a River: The Hymns Project, in November 2006.

Rice released What a Heart Is Beating For in July 2007, further positioning him as a pop artist. Only 2 of its 13 songs contained overt faith themes.

=== Other ===
Since 2007, Rice has branched out in the visual arts, including photography and painting. In 2016, he self-published Widen, a book of poetry.

In December 2018, Rice and Andrew Ripp pre-released an album, Songs We Wrote on Tuesdays, as Ripp+Rice as well as a single "This Ain't No Love Song" from that album. The album, a mix of adult contemporary and country music and was officially released on January 4, 2019.

== Sexual assault allegations ==
On October 15, 2020, Relevant reported that a young man had made allegations of sexual assault against Rice.

=== Tates Creek Presbyterian Church ===
The complainant claimed that the offences had occurred several times between 1995 and 2003 when Rice led worship at retreats for the youth and college students of Tates Creek Presbyterian Church in Lexington, Kentucky. The church's statement stated that the church elders had voted unanimously to initiate an independent investigation with an outside organization, GRACE, "that investigates allegations of abuse in Christian institutions." The church pastor said that although Rice was never an employee of the church, they felt responsible for investigating the matter because “if this individual had not been involved in our youth ministry, he would not have been exposed to Mr. Rice.”

In June 2022, Tates Creek Presbyterian Church released GRACE's report, which found the allegations to be credible. Rice has not released a statement regarding the allegations to date.

== Discography ==
=== Studio albums ===
Year	Album details	Peak chart positions	
Year	Album details	US	US Christ
1994	Live By Faith: Released: 1994; Label: none; Format: CD, DI	—	—
1997	Deep Enough to Dream: Released: September 2, 1997; Label: Rocketown; Format: CD, DI	—	7
1998	Past the Edges: Released: September 15, 1998; Label: Rocketown; Format: CD, DI	167	4
2000	Smell the Color 9: Released: January 19, 2000; Label: Rocketown; Format: CD, DI	—	20
2003	Run the Earth... Watch the Sky: Released: March 4, 2003; Label: Rocketown; Format: CD, DI	161	12
2005	Amusing: Released: August 23, 2005; Label: Eb+Flo; Format: CD, DI	—	10
2006	Peace Like a River: The Hymns Project: Released: January 1, 2006; Label: Eb+Flo; Format: CD, DI	—	—
2007	What a Heart Is Beating For: Released: July 17, 2007; Label: Eb+Flo; Format: CD, DI	—	9
2019	Songs We Wrote on Tuesdays (as Ripp+Rice, with Andrew Ripp): Released: January 4, 2019; Label: none; Format: CD, DI	—	—
2019	Untitled Hymn: A Collection of Hymns: Released: May 17, 2019; Label: Fair Trade/Columbia; Format: CD, DI	—	—

=== EPs and other releases ===
Year	Album details	Peak chart positions
Year	Album details	US Christ
2001	The Living Room Sessions: Released: April 5, 2001; Label: Rocketown; Format: CD, DI	23
2001	The Living Room Sessions: Christmas: Released: October 2, 2001; Label: Rocketown; Format: CD, DI	26
2004	Short Term Memories: Released: June 8, 2004; Label: Rocketown; Format: CD, DI	10
2005	Snapshots: Live and Fan Favorites: Released: February 8, 2005; Label: Rocketown; Format: CD, DI	48
2005	When Did You Fall: Released: August 23, 2005; Label: Eb+Flo; Format: CD, DI	—
2005	Merry Chris Rice: Released: November 15, 2005; Label: Eb+Flo; Format: CD, DI	—

=== Singles ===
Year	Title	Peak positions			Album
Year	Title	US AC	US Christ.	US Christ AC	Album
1997	"Deep Enough To Dream"	—	—	—	Deep Enough to Dream
2002	"Christmas Party"	—	—	—	The Living Room Sessions: Christmas
2002	"The Other Side of the Radio"	—	—	36	Run the Earth... Watch the Sky
2003	"Smile (Just Want To Be With You)"	—	2	2	Run the Earth... Watch the Sky
2003	"Untitled Hymn (Come To Jesus)"	—	38	37	Run the Earth... Watch the Sky
2004	"Go Light Your World"	—	23	21	Short Term Memories
2004	"Cartoons"	—	39	35	Short Term Memories
2005	"Love Like Crazy"	—	—	38	Amusing
2006	"When Did You Fall (In Love With Me)"	9	18	17	Amusing
2006	"The Christmas Song (Chesnuts Roasting on an Open Fire)"	—	34	31	Merry Chris Rice
2007	"Lemonade"	22	—	—	What a Heart Is Beating For
2007	"Sad Song"	—	—	—	What a Heart Is Beating For

== Awards ==
- 1998 – Nominated for six Dove Awards, including New Artist of the Year, Male Vocalist of the Year, Songwriter of the Year and Pop/Contemporary Album of the Year
- 1999 – Dove Award winner for Male Vocalist of the Year and for participation in Special Event Album of the Year – Exodus
- 2000 – Dove Award nominee for Recorded Music Packaging
- 2002 – Dove Award nominee for Instrumental Album of the Year – Living Room Sessions: Hymns
