= Petra discography =

- Studio albums: 23
- Live albums: 2
- Compilation albums: 3
- Video albums: 8

This article details the discography of Petra. Petra is a music group formed in 1972, and regarded as a pioneer of the Christian rock and contemporary Christian music genres. Though they disbanded formally in 2005, incarnations of Petra have played reunion shows in the years since and released an album in fall 2010. The band released 25 albums (including two live albums, and two Spanish albums) during their career of more than 50 years, starting with their first release in 1974 and finishing with their last album in 2026.

== Albums ==
=== Studio albums ===
Title	Details	Peak chart positions		Certifications
Title	Details	US	US Christ	Certifications
Petra	Released: 1974; Label: Myrrh/A&M	—	—	
Come and Join Us	Released: 1977; Label: Myrrh/A&M	—	—	
Washes Whiter Than	Released: 1979; Label: StarSong/A&M	—	—	
Never Say Die	Released: 1981; Label: Star Song/A&M	—	29	
More Power To Ya	Released: September 21, 1982; Label: Star Song/A&M	—	4	
Not of this World	Released: 1983; Label: Star Song/A&M	—	1	
Beat the System	Released: 1984; Label: Star Song/A&M	—	1	
Captured In Time and Space	Released: 1986; Label: Star Song/A&M	—	4	
Back to the Street	Released: 1986; Label: Star Song/A&M	—	4	
This Means War!	Released: 1987; Label: Star Song/A&M	—	1	
On Fire!	Released: 1988; Label: Star Song	—	3	
Petra Praise: The Rock Cries Out	Released: October 3, 1989; Label: DaySpring/Word, A&M, Epic	—	2	
Beyond Belief	Released: June 20, 1990; Label: DaySpring/Word, A&M, Epic	—	1	RIAA: Gold
Unseen Power	Released: November 1991; Label: DaySpring/Word, A&M, Epic	—	1	
Petra en Alabanza	Released: 1992; Label: DaySpring/Word, A&M, Epic	—	—	
Wake-Up Call	Released: November 9, 1993; Label: DaySpring/Word, A&M, Epic	—	2	
No Doubt	Released: August 26, 1995; Label: Word, Epic	91	2	
Petra Praise 2: We Need Jesus	Released: February 18, 1997; Label: Word, Epic	155	2	RIAA: Gold
God Fixation	Released: April 29, 1998; Label: Word, Epic	—	10	
Double Take	Released: February 29, 2000; Label: Word, Epic	—	34	
Revival	Released: November 20, 2001; Label: Inpop	—	—	
Jekyll & Hyde	Released: August 19, 2003; Label: Inpop	—	22	
Jekyll & Hyde en Español	Released: April 20, 2004; Label: Inpop	—	—	
Farewell	Released: November 22, 2005; Label: Inpop	—	45	
Hope	Released: January 5, 2026; Label: Girder Music	—	—	
"—" denotes a recording that did not chart or was not released in that territory.

== Unreleased songs ==
Petra recorded several songs for multi-artist compilation albums that are not available on any of the band's own albums. The band also has songs that were performed only in concert or never recorded for an album.

- "Rocking On with Jesus" (played in concert in the 1970s, never recorded)

This song has recently been recorded by the band GHF (God Has Forgiven) on their album Honestly Live. GHF consists of the original Petra lineup minus Bob Hartman: Greg Hough on guitars and vocals, Bill Glover on drums and vocals, and John DeGroff on bass and vocals.

GHF also played two "reunion" shows with Bob Hartman during Petra's farewell tour.

- "Onward Christian Soldiers" (featured on the album Our Hymns, 1989, later included on the two-CD/Cassette 1996 Spring Arbor Release Hymns: 26 All Time Classics , and finally incorporated on the PETRA compilation album Still Means War (2002) )
- "Who Do You Listen To?" (featured on the video Who Do You Listen To? Music Video Soundtrack, 1989, later included on the CD Songs for a Small Circle of Friends, 1991)
- "Our Turn Now" (featured on Carman's album Addicted To Jesus, 1991)
- "I Don't Want To Fall Away From You" (featured on the album No Compromise: Remembering The Music of Keith Green, 1992)
- "It's a New Day" (written for Jekyll & Hyde, 2003, unreleased)

== Videos ==
- Captured In Time & Space (1986, Starsong)
- On Fire! Video Event (1989, Word)
- Beyond Belief Video Album (Mini Movie) (1990, Word)
- Backstage Pass (1992, Word)
- Wake-Up Call Video Collection (1993, Word)
- Revival Inpop (November 20, 2001, Inpop Records)
- Farewell (March 7, 2006, Inpop Records)
- Captured in Time & Space DVD (2006, exclusively licensed to Petra Productions, Inc.)
- Back to the Rock Live DVD (July 8, 2011, independent / September 20, 2011, P-ID Blue)

== Compilation albums ==
There are several official and unofficial compilation albums of Petra. These are the official ones. In addition to this list, there are youth choir collections (sheet music for use by churches) which include studio recordings of professional singers and musicians performing those versions.

- Petra Means Rock (1989, Star Song Records)
- War & Remembrance (2CD/CS with booklet, 1990, Star Song Records)
- Petrafied: The Best Of Petra (1991, Star Song Records)
- Petraphonics (1992, Star Song Records)
- Power Praise (1994, Star Song Records), not to be confused with either Petra Praise album on Word Records—this album contained songs that simply contained a praise theme.
- Rock Block (1995, Star Song Records)
- The Early Years (1996, Star Song Records)
- The Coloring Song (1999, EMI/Capitol – same track list as The Early Years)
- Greatest Hits, Vol. 1 (2001, Bompastor/Word – Brazilian release)
- Still Means War (2002, Word Records)
- The Power Of Praise (2003, Word Records)
- The Praise Collection (2006, Word Records)
- The Ultimate Collection (2006, Star Song Records)
- The Early Years (2006, Star Song Records – new artwork)
- The Definitive Collection (2007, Word Records)
- Best of the 80s (2012, Star Song Records)
- 40th Anniversary (2013, Star Song Records)
- Fifty (Anniversary Collection) (2023, Girder Music)

== Singles ==
Title	Year	Peak chart positions					Album
Title	Year	US Christ AC	US Christ CHR	US Christ Rock	US Inspo	AUS	Album
"Why Should the Father Bother"	1979	3	3	×	—	—	Washes Whiter Than
"Yahweh Love"	1979	20	20	×	—	—	Washes Whiter Than
"The Coloring Song"	1981	1	8	×	1	—	Never Say Die
"More Power to Ya"	1983	1	1	×	18	—	More Power To Ya
"Stand Up"	1983	—	—	8	—	—	More Power To Ya
"Judas' Kiss"	1983	—	—	9	—	—	More Power To Ya
"Not of This World"	1983	3	3	19	—	—	Not of This World
"Not by Sight"	1984	—	—	1	—	—	Not of This World
"Grave Robber"	1984	22	22	11	22	—	Not of This World
"Bema Seat"	1984	—	—	9	—	—	Not of This World
"Blinded Eyes"	1984	—	—	15	—	—	Not of This World
"Hollow Eyes"	1985	7	7	14	7	—	Beat the System
"Beat the System"	1985	—	2	1	—	85	Beat the System
"Adonai"	1985	—	—	13	—	—	Beat the System
"Witch Hunt"	1985	—	13	—	—	—	Beat the System
"It Is Finished"	1985	—	—	11	—	—	Beat the System
"Voice in the Wind"	1986	13	13	18	—	—	Beat the System
"Thankful Heart"	1986	1	3	—	8	—	Back to the Street
"Back to the Street"	1986	5	5	2	—	—	Back to the Street
"Whole World"	1987	—	13	5	—	97	Back to the Street
"King's Ransom"	1987	29	13	—	—	—	Back to the Street
"Shakin' the House"	1987	—	—	8	—	—	Back to the Street
"This Means War!"	1987	—	—	1	—	—	This Means War!
"Don't Let Your Heart Be Hardened"	1987	1	1	—	4	—	This Means War!
"I Am Available"	1987	4	8	—	18	—	This Means War!
"He Came, He Saw, He Conquered"	1987	—	—	3	—	—	This Means War!
"Get on Your Knees and Fight Like a Man"	1988	—	10	14	—	—	This Means War!
"First Love"	1988	1	1	—	12	—	On Fire!
"Homeless Few"	1988	7	2	—	—	—	On Fire!
"Mine Field"	1989	—	—	1	—	—	On Fire!
"Hit You Where You Live"	1989	—	—	5	—	—	On Fire!
"Open Book"	1989	19	2	—	—	—	On Fire!
"Counsel of the Holy"	1989	—	—	8	—	—	On Fire!
"Onward Christian Soldiers	1989	—	14	20	—	—	Our Hymns
"We Exalt Thee"	1989	25	8	—	—	—	Petra Praise: The Rock Cries Out
"I Love the Lord"	1989	—	—	2	—	—	Petra Praise: The Rock Cries Out
"Salvation Belongs to Out God"	1990	—	23	—	—	—	Petra Praise: The Rock Cries Out
"Prayer"	1990	1	1	—	1	—	Beyond Belief
"Creed"	1990	—	—	1	—	—	Beyond Belief
"Love"	1990	1	3	—	8	—	Beyond Belief
"Seen and Not Heard"	1990	—	—	1	—	—	Beyond Belief
"I Am on the Rock"	1991	—	—	2	—	—	Beyond Belief
"Beyond Belief"	1991	—	3	6	—	—	Beyond Belief
"I Need to Hear from You"	1992	14	1	—	—	—	Unseen Power
"Destiny"	1992	—	—	1	—	—	Unseen Power
"In the Likeness of You"	1992	4	3	—	—	—	Unseen Power
"Ready, Willing and Able"	1992	—	—	1	—	—	Unseen Power
"Hand on My Heart"	1992	1	1	—	—	—	Unseen Power
"Dance"	1992	—	—	7	—	—	Unseen Power
"Who's on the Lord's Side?"	1992	—	23	—	—	—	Unseen Power
"Radio Daze"	1992	30	—	—	—	—	Petraphonics
"I Don't Want to Fall Away from You"	1993	36	11	—	—	—	No Compromise: Remembering the Music of Keith Green
"Just Reach Out"	1993	12	1	—	—	—	Wake-Up Call
"Underneath the Blood"	1993	—	—	2	—	—	Wake-Up Call
"Marks of the Cross"	1994	11	1	—	—	—	Wake-Up Call
"Midnight Oil"	1994	—	—	3	—	—	Wake-Up Call
"He's Been in My Shoes"	1994	32	12	—	—	—	Wake-Up Call
"Sleeping Giant"	1994	—	—	8	—	—	Wake-Up Call
"Praying Man"	1994	—	9	—	—	—	Wake-Up Call
"Good News"	1994	—	—	14	—	—	Wake-Up Call
"No Doubt"	1995	2	8	—	11	—	No Doubt
"Right Place"	1995	—	—	1	—	—	No Doubt
"The Rock Block"	1995	—	—	12	—	—	Rock Block
"Sincerely Yours"	1995	5	3	—	25	—	No Doubt
"Think Twice"	1995	—	—	4	—	—	No Doubt
"We Hold Out Our Hearts to You"	1996	28	16	—	—	—	No Doubt
"Enter In"	1996	—	17	9	—	—	No Doubt
"We Need Jesus"	1997	5	6	—	—	—	Petra Praise 2: We Need Jesus
"The Holiest Name"	1997	25	11	—	—	—	Petra Praise 2: We Need Jesus
"Lord, I Lift Your Name on High"	1997	35	13	—	—	—	Petra Praise 2: We Need Jesus
"If I Had to Die for Someone"	1998	35	—	—	—	—	God Fixation
"God Fixation"	1998	—	—	13	—	—	God Fixation
"The Noise We Make"	2001	—	—	1	—	—	Revival
"Jekyll & Hyde"	2003	—	—	1	—	—	Jekyll & Hyde
"Deliver Us"	2025	—	—	1	—	—	Hope
"Filthy Lucre"	2026	—	—	8	—	—	Hope
"Kiss the Coals"	2026	—	—	—	—	—	Hope
"Skin in the Game"	2026	—	—	—	—	—	Hope
"—" denotes a recording that did not chart or was not released in that territory.

== Solo projects ==
There are several solo projects by members of Petra, namely those of Greg X. Volz (lead vocals, 1977–1985), John Lawry (keyboards & vocals, 1985–1995), and John Schlitt (lead vocals, 1986–2005, 2010–present). John Elefante, co-producer of Petra, also brought out a few albums. Both he and his brother Dino, co-producer of Petra, founded the group Mastedon and have produced several other bands together.

Also released in March 2007 was a duet project by John Schlitt and Bob Hartman entitled Vertical Expressions, under the band name II Guys From Petra.

== See also ==
- Bob Hartman – founder of Petra
- II Guys from Petra
