= Unfit for Swine =

Unfit For Swine

Studio album by John Schlitt
- Released: July 1996
- Studio: Dark Horse Recording Studio, Fun Attic Studio and Dobb's Palace (Franklin, Tennessee); The B Valley (Brentwood, Tennessee); Sixteenth Avenue Sound (Nashville, Tennessee)
- Genre: Christian rock
- Length: 40:16
- Label: Word
- Producer: Mark Heimermann; Dann Huff; David Huff

John Schlitt chronology
Shake (1995)	Unfit For Swine (1996)	The Grafting (2008)

Professional ratings
Review scores
Source	Rating
AllMusic	4/5 stars

Unfit for Swine is the second solo album released by John Schlitt, lead singer of the Christian rock band, Petra. It was released in July, 1996.

== Track listing ==
All songs written by John Schlitt, except where noted.

1. "Save Me" – 3:37 (music by Dann and David Huff)
2. "God Is Too Big" – 3:42 (words by Schlitt and Mark Heimermann, music by Ronny Cates)
3. "Can't Get Away" – 4:18 (words by Heimermann, music by Toby McKeehan)
4. "We Worship You" – 4:12 (words by Schlitt and Heimermann, music by Heimermann and Dann Huff)
5. "Need I Remind You" – 4:15 (words by Schlitt and Heimermann, music by Heimermann)
6. "Take You On" – 3:53 (music by Cates)
7. "Helping Hand" – 4:49 (music by Dann & David Huff)
8. "There Is Someone" – 3:45 (words & music by Schlitt and Rich Gootee)
9. "I Killed a Man" – 3:57 (words by Schlitt and Heimermann, music by Heimermann and Dann Huff)
10. "Don't Have To Take It" – 3:48 (words by Schlitt and David Huff, music by David Lichens and Jim Cooper)

== Personnel ==
- John Schlitt – lead vocals, backing vocals (1–6, 9)
- Mark Heimermann – keyboards, backing vocals (2–6, 9)
- Larry Hall – keyboard pad (8)
- Dann Huff – electric guitar, acoustic guitar, guitar solo (1, 3, 9, 10), backing vocals (2, 5, 10)
- George Cocchini – electric guitar, acoustic guitar, guitar solo (6)
- Paul Franklin – steel guitar (7, 8)
- David Lichens – additional guitars (10)
- Jackie Street – bass
- David Huff – drums, percussion, synth guitar (7), synth bass (7), backing vocals (7, 10)
- Terry McMillan – percussion (2–6, 9)
- Micah Wilshire – backing vocals (7, 8)

== Production ==
- Lynn Keesecker – A&R
- Bubba Smith – A&R
- Dann Huff – producer (1, 7, 8, 10), overdub engineer
- David Huff – producer (1, 7, 8, 10), overdub engineer
- Mark Heimermann – producer (2–6, 9)
- Joe Baldridge – tracking engineer, mixing
- Todd Robbins – overdub engineer
- The Dobbs – overdub engineer
- Eric Elwell – overdub engineer, tracking assistant
- Mike Wrucke – tracking assistant
- Pete Martinez – mix assistant
- Hank Williams – mastering at MasterMix (Nashville, Tennessee)
- PJ Heimermann – production manager
- Christy Coxe – art direction
- Astrid Herbold – design
- Matthew Barnes – photography
