= Grammy Award for Best Rock Gospel Album =

Music award category

The Grammy Award for Best Rock Gospel Album was awarded from 1991 to 2011. From 1991 to 1993 the category was awarded as Best Rock/Contemporary Gospel Album. From 2007 to 2011 it was awarded as Best Rock or Rap Gospel Album.

The award was discontinued from 2012 in a major overhaul of Grammy categories. From 2012, recordings in this category were shifted to either Best Contemporary Christian Music Album or Best Gospel Album categories.

== Recipients ==
Year^{[I]}	Winning artist(s)	Work	Other nominees	Ref.
1991	Petra	Beyond Belief	Phil Keaggy – Find Me in These Fields; Mylon & Broken Heart – Crank It Up; Eddie DeGarmo – Phase II; Charlie Peacock – The Secret of Time	
1992	Russ Taff	Under Their Influence	Kim Hill – Brave Heart; DeGarmo & Key – Go to the Top; DC Talk – Nu Thang; Margaret Becker – Simple House	
1993	Petra	Unseen Power	White Heart – Tales of Wonder; Pray for Rain – Pray for Rain; Geoff Moore and the Distance – A Friend Like U; Newsboys – Not Ashamed	
1994	DC Talk	Free at Last	Phil Keaggy – Crimson and Blue; Geoff Moore and the Distance – Evolution; DeGarmo & Key – Heat it Up; Disciples of Christ – Pullin' No Punches	
1995	Petra	Wake-Up Call	Steve Taylor – Squint; Newsboys – Going Public; DeGarmo & Key – To Extremes; Various Artists – Strong Hand of Love	
1996	Ashley Cleveland	Lesson of Love	Big Tent Revival – Big Tent Revival; Jars of Clay – Jars of Clay; Geoff Moore and the Distance – Home Run!; Petra – No Doubt	
1997	DC Talk	Jesus Freak	Audio Adrenaline – Bloom; Rebecca St. James – God; Newsboys – Take Me to Your Leader; Big Tent Revival – Open All Nite	
1998	DC Talk	Welcome to the Freak Show	Third Day – Conspiracy No. 5; Smalltown Poets – Smalltown Poets; Geoff Moore and the Distance – Threads; All Star United – All Star United	
1999	Ashley Cleveland	You Are There	Sixpence None the Richer – Sixpence None the Richer; Petra – God Fixation; Big Tent Revival – Amplifier; Audio Adrenaline – Some Kind of Zombie	
2000	Rebecca St. James	Pray	Third Day – Time; Gospel Gangstaz – I Can See Clearly Now; Big Tent Revival – Choose Life; Audio Adrenaline – Underdog	
2001	Petra	Double Take	Third Day – Offerings: A Worship Album; Switchfoot – Learning to Breathe; Smalltown Poets – Third Verse; Jennifer Knapp – Lay It Down	
2002	DC Talk	Solo	The Choir – Flap Your Wings; T-Bone – Tha Last Street Preacha; Sonicflood – Sonicpraise; Big Tent Revival – Big Tent Revival Live	
2003	Third Day	Come Together	TobyMac – Momentum; Jennifer Knapp – The Way I Am; GRITS – The Art of Translation; Audio Adrenaline – Lift	
2004	Audio Adrenaline	Worldwide	Robert Randolph and the Family Band – Unclassified; Relient K – Two Lefts Don't Make a Right...but Three Do; Petra – Jekyll and Hyde; Freshie – Red Letterz	
2005	Third Day	Wire	TobyMac – Welcome to Diverse City; Various Artists – Holy Hip Hop: Taking Gospel to the Streets; Tait – Lose This Life; Skillet – Collide; Sarah Kelly – Take Me Away	
2006	Audio Adrenaline	Until My Heart Caves In	Day of Fire – Day of Fire; Fresh I.E. – Truth Is Fallin' in Tha Streetz; GRITS – Dichotomy B; The Cross Movement – Higher Definition	
2007	Jonny Lang	Turn Around	T-Bone – Bone-A-Fide; Red – End of Silence; DecembeRadio – DecembeRadio; Sarah Kelly – Where the Past Meets Today	
2008	Ashley Cleveland	Before the Daylight's Shot	Skillet – Comatose; Pillar – The Reckoning; Da' T.R.U.T.H. – Open Book; The Cross Movement – HIStory: Our Place in His Story	
2009	TobyMac	Alive and Transported	Superchick – Rock What You Got; Sanctus Real – We Need Each Other; Flame – Our World: Redeemed; After Edmund – Hello	
2010	Third Day	Live Revelations	John Wells the Tonic – The Dash; Red – Innocence & Instinct; Decyfer Down – Crash; Da' T.R.U.T.H. – The Big Picture	
2011	Switchfoot	Hello Hurricane	Lecrae – Rehab; Gungor – Beautiful Things; Fireflight – For Those Who Wait; David Crowder Band – Church Music	

^{^[I]} Each year is linked to the article about the Grammy Awards held that year.

== See also ==
- List of Christian rock bands
- List of Grammy Award categories
