= The Grafting =

Studio album by John Schlitt
- Released: January 22, 2008
- Recorded: 2007
- Genre: Christian rock
- Label: 4K
- Producer: Dan Needham

John Schlitt chronology
Unfit for Swine (1996)	The Grafting (2008)	The Greater Cause (2012)

The Grafting is the third solo album by Christian rock singer and former Petra frontman, John Schlitt. The album was released on January 22, 2008 through TAG Artist Group. It was produced by Dan Needham, who is Schlitt's son-in-law.

The album release was marked by a premiere performance by Schlitt of the tracks "The Grafting" and "Only Men" from the album on the Celebration program, which was aired internationally by the Daystar Television Network. The program also included an interview with Schlitt. The videos of Schlitt's performances of these two songs is available for download at his official website.

== Background and production ==
John Schlitt hinted at a third solo album in a 1999 interview with the Petra Rocks My World fan website, three years after the release of his second solo album, Unfit for Swine. "I don't know when, but I'd like to do it [release a third solo album] as quickly as possible," Schlitt said. "It'll be after I feel this new Petra has gotten back on their feet."

In a 2005 interview with the same website, Schlitt said that Petra's retirement that year was "opening doors" for his solo record to "finally get finished."

In 2007, Schlitt finished the recording of The Grafting, and also signed with Fused Management. The new album was produced by Schlitt's son-in-law Dan Needham. Schlitt said about the album that "the music itself is going down a whole new path; the fact that my interests have changed as I have grown older is reflected in [it]." According to him, the album covers topics like adoption, divorce, and poverty, among others. Schlitt also described the album as "more personal and emotional" than his previous albums.

== Reception ==
Wayne Myatt, from Jesus Freak Hideout, gave the album 3.5 stars (out of 5) in his review. He wrote that although the album had an "inconsistent feel to it as though it was a project worked on over a period of time" it was worth a listen. He added that The Grafting "will definitely please fans of Petra who are longing for a substitute".

Freelance writer Tracy Darlington praised Schlitt's vocals writing that although the album "could be considered a softer rock album than Schlitt’s first two solo endeavors, his signature vocals still bring the rock feel home."

== Track listing ==
All songs written by Dan Needham, except where noted.

1. "Stand" (Mark Heimermann, Schlitt, Kevan Cajka, Needham) - 4:08
2. "Keep Your Light On" - 3:25
3. "Only Men" - 4:26
4. "Face of God" (Cajka, Scott Faircloff, Needham) - 4:20
5. "The Grafting" - 3:51
6. "First Song" (Cajka, Needham) - 3:55
7. "Your Eyes" (Heimermann, Marc Martel, Cajka, Needham) - 4:25
8. "Lord Have Mercy" (Steve Merkel) - 4:02
9. "Gravity" - 4:16
10. "Carry On" - 4:50

== Personnel ==
- John Schlitt – vocals
- Dan Needham – programming (1–3, 7, 9, 10), drums, guitars (2), additional backing vocals (2, 3), keyboards (3, 4, 8), acoustic guitar (3, 5, 6, 8), percussion (5), hi-strung acoustic guitar (5), bass (6), acoustic piano (7, 10), all instruments (9)
- Blair Masters – programming (5), string arrangements (5)
- Gary Burnette – guitars (1, 4, 7, 10)
- Jerry McPherson – guitars (3, 6), electric guitar (8)
- David Cleveland – electric guitar (5)
- Mark Hill – bass (1, 4, 7, 10)
- Joey Canaday – bass (2, 3, 8)
- Matt Pierson – bass (5)
- Kari Needham – backing vocals (2, 8), vocal intro (8)

Production

- Dan Needham – producer, tracking engineer, mixing at Brownstone Recording, Brentwood, Tennessee
- Danny Duncan – tracking engineer
- Dan Shike – mastering at Tone and Volume Mastering, Nashville, Tennessee
- Erick Anderson – photography
- Kari Needham – illustration
- Stephen Boatright – graphic design
