= Louie Weaver =

American drummer

Adrian Louis Weaver III (born July 13, 1951) is an American drummer most famous for being a long-time member of Christian rock band Petra. Weaver is also a member of the church of the Nazarene. He was dismissed from the band in 2003; he is currently working on several projects. In 2010, Weaver reunited with former members of Petra (Greg X. Volz, Bob Hartman, John Lawry and Mark Kelly) to form Classic Petra.

Starting in 2017, Weaver played in the CPR Band and recorded an album with them.

== Biography ==
Weaver was born in Nashville, Tennessee, where he attended high school at Glencliff High School. He was part of a school jazz band playing at the Nashville Municipal Auditorium. In 1969 he graduated and continued to study in Trevecca Nazarene College. There he obtained a B.A. in percussion.

After graduating he went on to work with several artists. He was a session player for Randy Matthews and Fireworks, also touring with Matthews and Crossfire. He also played with Parable, Good Grief, and Chuck McCleod's Band.

In 1981 he joined Petra becoming a staple of the band with his trademark drumming and style. After 22 years, he was fired in 2003 amidst some controversy. Both Petra and Weaver have since dismissed the incident and little has been discussed of the issue since. He was replaced by Paul Simmons. In 2005, he collaborated with Project Damage Control with John Schlitt on vocals. Weaver performed briefly with a band called Viktor with other well-known veteran musicians.

Weaver played with Classic Petra from 2010 to 2012, which was a re-united version of the band featuring some of the members from the 80's: Bob Hartman, Greg X. Volz, John Lawry and Mark Kelly. This instance of the band recorded Back to the Rock in 2010, which was Weaver's first studio album with the Classic Petra lineup since Beat the System in 1984.

Weaver was voted "Favorite Drummer" by CCM Magazine's readers choice for five years in a row (1989-93.) Weaver endorses Paiste Cymbals, Vater Sticks, DW Drums, and Remo drumheads.

== Personal life ==
Weaver is married to his wife Penny. Weaver is a fan of Mickey Mouse, using his imagery on his clothes, drums, etc. He even named his daughter after the famous mouse.

== Discography ==
=== with Petra ===
Date of release	Title	Label
1982	More Power to Ya	StarSong
1983	Not of this World	StarSong
1984	Beat the System	StarSong
1986	Captured in Time and Space	StarSong
1986	Back to the Street	StarSong
1987	This Means War!	StarSong
1988	On Fire!	StarSong
1989	Petra Praise: The Rock Cries Out	Dayspring/Word/Epic
1990	Beyond Belief	Dayspring/Word/Epic
1991	Unseen Power	Dayspring/Word/Epic
1992	Petra en Alabanza	Dayspring/Word/Epic
1993	Wake-Up Call	Dayspring/Word/Epic
1995	No Doubt	Word/Epic
1997	Petra Praise 2: We Need Jesus	Word/Epic
1998	God Fixation	Word/Epic
2000	Double Take	Word/Epic
2001	Revival	inpop/EMI
2010	Back to the Rock	Classic Petra LLC

=== other projects ===
Date of release	Title	Label
1982	Fireworks: Sightseeing at Night	
2005	Project Damage Control	
2017	Back to the Rock 2	
