= Jekyll and Hyde (Petra album) =

Jekyll & Hyde

Studio album by Petra
- Released: August 19, 2003
- Studio: Bridge St. Studios
- Genre: Christian rock, heavy metal, hard rock
- Length: 31:09
- Label: Inpop
- Producer: Peter Furler

Petra chronology
| Revival (2001) | Jekyll & Hyde (2003) | Jekyll & Hyde en Español (2004) |

Professional ratings
Review scores
| Source | Rating |
|---|---|
| AllMusic | 4/5 stars |
| Jesus Freak Hideout | 4/5 stars |

Jekyll & Hyde is the twentieth studio album released by Christian rock band Petra. It was released in 2003 by Inpop Records. The music features a progressive metal sound that drew comparison to Dio and Queensrÿche.

The title of the album is based on Robert Louis Stevenson's 1886 novella The Strange Case of Dr. Jekyll and Mr. Hyde due to the similar issues of sin and temptation it deals with.

== Album background ==
=== Concept and songwriting ===
After the release of Revival, Petra's third praise album and their first album with Inpop Records, John Schlitt says fans started sending e-mails to the record company asking them for a more straightforward rock album. Inpop agreed to the idea and they started working on a second album together.

Schlitt has said that the record company encouraged Petra founder, guitarist and main songwriter Bob Hartman to "just be you" and to "write those songs that you're used to writing," which motivated Hartman. New bassist Greg Bailey co-wrote the song "Would'a, Should'a Could'a" with Hartman.

The album's concept, and its title track, are references to the Robert Louis Stevenson novella The Strange Case of Dr. Jekyll and Mr. Hyde. According to Hartman, it "is an intriguing look at the internal battle between right and wrong. It's about the fighting that goes on inside of us. It's like when Paul said, 'The things I want to do are the things I don't do, and the things I don't want to do are the things that I do.'"

Brent Handy, an industry insider who worked with singer John Schlitt on Project Damage Control, told fan website Petra Rocks My World that "the band thought that Jekyll & Hyde was a make-or-break album".

=== Recording ===
With Schlitt and Hartman as the only remaining members, Greg Bailey was hired as bassist. Bailey collaborated in the songwriting of one song and recorded background vocals. However, producer Peter Furler, one of Inpop's founders, decided to use session musicians Wade Jaynes and Phil Joel to play bass.

The album also features Furler on drums replacing long-time member Louie Weaver for the recording. However, temporary drummer Justin Johnson is partially featured on the album booklet. He would tour with the band until permanent drummer Paul Simmons was hired.

== Track listing ==
All songs written by Bob Hartman, except where noted.

1. "Jekyll & Hyde" – 3:04
2. "All About Who You Know" – 2:35
3. "Stand" – 3:19
4. "Would'a, Should'a, Could'a" (words & music by Hartman and Greg Bailey) – 2:58
5. "Perfect World" – 3:13
6. "Test of Time" – 3:00
7. "I Will Seek You" – 2:34
8. "Life As We Know It" – 3:27
9. "Till Everything I Do" – 3:03
10. "Sacred Trust" – 3:52

== Awards ==
- Nominated for Grammy Award for Best Rock Gospel Album in 2003.

== Personnel ==
Petra

- John Schlitt – lead vocals
- Bob Hartman – guitars
- Greg Bailey – backing vocals

Guest musicians

- Jeff Frankenstein – programming
- Wade Jaynes – bass
- Phil Joel – bass, backing vocals
- Peter Furler – drums, backing vocals
- Jamie Rowe – backing vocals

Production

- Peter Furler – producer
- Dan Rudin – engineer at Bridge St. Studios
- Bob Hartman – additional engineer at House of Bob Studios
- Tony Palacios – mixing at The Sound Kitchen, Franklin, Tennessee
- Kevin Pickle – mix assistant
- Richard Dodd – mastering at Vital Recordings, Nashville, Tennessee
- Clark Hook – cover art and design
- Jennie Rollings – cover art and design
- Allen Clark – photography
