= Wake-Up Call (album) =

Studio album by Petra
- Released: November 9, 1993
- Genre: Christian rock, hard rock
- Length: 42:36
- Label: DaySpring, Word, Epic
- Producer: Brown Bannister

Petra chronology
Petra en Alabanza (1992)	Wake-Up Call (1993)	No Doubt (1995)

Professional ratings
Review scores
Source	Rating
AllMusic	2/5 stars
Jesus Freak Hideout	3.5/5 stars

Wake-Up Call is the fourteenth studio album of the Christian rock band, Petra. It was released on November 9, 1993. The album was one of the most successful for the band garnering them both a Grammy Award and a Dove Award.

The album marks a dramatic shift in tone for the band. The sound is more raw, there are fewer driving rock songs, and it concludes with three consecutive ballads.

== Track listing ==
All songs written by Bob Hartman, except where noted.

1. "Midnight Oil" – 3:17
2. "Good News" – 4:29
3. "Strong Convictions" – 3:53
4. "He's Been in My Shoes" – 4:22
5. "Praying Man" (words by John Lawry, music by Lawry & Jim Cooper) – 4:25
6. "Underneath the Blood" (music by Ronny Cates) – 3:30
7. "Sleeping Giant" (music by Cates) – 5:28
8. "Believer in Deed" – 4:06
9. "Marks of the Cross" (music by Cates) – 4:35
10. "Just Reach Out" (words & music by John Schlitt and Rich Gootee) – 4:28

== Personnel ==
Petra

- Bob Hartman – guitars
- John Schlitt – lead vocals
- John Lawry – keyboards
- Ronny Cates – bass
- Louie Weaver – drums

Backing vocals

- Michael Black
- Nanette Britt
- Bob Carlisle
- Vicki Carrico
- Chris Eddy
- Tommy Funderburk
- Ron Hemby
- Robert White Johnson
- Gordon Kennedy
- Joe Pizzulo
- Jimmie Lee Sloas
- Judson Spence
- Dale Thompson

Production

- Brown Bannister – producer, additional engineer
- Lynn Keesecker – A&R direction
- Jeff Balding – engineer at The Power Station, New York City; The Dugout, Nashville, Tennessee; Ocean Way Recording, Hollywood, California, mixing at Sixteenth Avenue Sound, Nashville, Tennessee; Ocean Way Recording
- Steve Bishir – additional engineer
- Rory Romano – assistant engineer
- Wayne Mehl – assistant engineer
- Martin Woodlee – assistant engineer
- Jeff Demorris – mix assistant
- Pete Martinez – mix assistant
- Greg Parker – mix assistant
- Doug Sax – mastering at The Mastering Lab, Hollywood, California
- Traci Sterling – production coordinator
- Diana Barnes – art direction
- Gabrielle Raumberger – design
- Michael Llewellyn – photography
- Dylan Tran – typography

== Awards ==
- Won Grammy Award for Best Rock Gospel Album in 1994.
- Won Dove Award for Rock Album of the Year at the 24th GMA Dove Awards in 1993.
