= The Christmas Project =

Studio album by John Schlitt
- Released: November 19, 2013
- Studio: Brownstone Recording (Brentwood, Tennessee)
- Genre: Christian rock
- Length: 37:49
- Label: 4K
- Producer: Dan Needham

The Christmas Project is a Christmas album from John Schlitt. 4K Records released the album on November 19, 2013. Schlitt worked with Dan Needham, in the production of this album.

== Critical reception ==
Professional ratings
Review scores
Source	Rating
CCM Magazine	4/5 stars
Cross Rhythms	9/10 squares
Jesus Freak Hideout	4/5 stars
New Release Today	4/5 stars

Awarding the album four stars at CCM Magazine, Andy Argyrakis states, "he brings that melodic rock style from both career chapters to the forefront of this festive and powerful collection that consists mostly of carols". Tony Cummings, indicating in a nine out of ten review for Cross Rhythms, writes, "One of the best Christmas albums you're likely to hear this or any year". Giving the album four stars from Jesus Freak Hideout, Bert Gangl says, "Judging from the high quality of his latest release, it would seem that, just like true love and fond memories, the much-loved singer only gets better with time." Jonathan J. Francesco, rating the album four stars by New Release Today, describes, "John Schlitt's first Christmas offering is the picture of a success."

== Track listing ==
No.	Title	Writer(s)	Length
1.	"Hallelujah Chorus (Handel's Messiah)"		2:15
2.	"Do You Hear What I Hear?"		4:39
3.	"Little Drummer Boy"		3:40
4.	"O Holy Night"		5:00
5.	"God Rest Ye Merry Gentlemen"		2:46
6.	"Good Christian Men Rejoice"		2:58
7.	"That Spirit of Christmas"	Parnel Davison, Mabel John, Joel Webster	4:01
8.	"We Three Kings"		3:55
9.	"What Christmas Needs to Be"	George Cocchini, Dan Needham, John Schlitt	4:05
10.	"What Child Is This?"		4:30
Total length:			37:49

== Personnel ==
- John Schlitt – lead and backing vocals
- Jeff Roach – keyboards
- Jason Webb – keyboards
- Blair Masters – programming (1)
- Tom Bukovac – guitars
- George Cocchini – guitars
- Jerry McPherson – guitars
- Mark Hill – bass
- Dan Needham – drums, percussion, arrangements (1–3, 5, 7, 8, 10)
- Logan Needham – Scripture reading (3)
- John Elefante – backing vocals (4)
- Kari Needham – backing vocals (7)
- Scott Faircloff – backing vocals (9)

Production

- Dan Needham – producer, engineer, mixing
- Billy Whittington – engineer
- Jim Falzone – mastering at Venus Mastering (Nashville, Tennessee)
- Jonathan Leslie – graphic design
- Leslie Ghag – photography
- Rachel Schlitt – photography
