= Petra Praise: The Rock Cries Out =

1989 studio album by Petra

Studio album by Petra
- Released: October 3, 1989
- Genres: Christian rock, praise
- Length: 45:58
- Labels: DaySpring; Word; A&M; Epic
- Producers: Bob Hartman and John Lawry

Petra chronology
Petra Means Rock (1989)	Petra Praise: The Rock Cries Out (1989)	Beyond Belief (1990)

Professional ratings
Review scores
Source	Rating
AllMusic	2.5/5 stars
Jesus Freak Hideout	not rated
The Phantom Tollbooth	not rated

Petra Praise: The Rock Cries Out is the eleventh studio album of the Christian rock band, Petra and their first praise album. It was released on October 3, 1989 by DaySpring Records, marking the band's return to the Word family as the early version of Petra was signed to sister label Myrrh.

The music is mostly a collection of traditional praise songs with a rock style. However, there are two original songs, both written by band founder Bob Hartman.

This album also marked the end of custom artwork on Petra albums. From this album forward Petra would use photos of the band on them for album covers. Compilations by Star Song would continue to use custom artwork though.

Commercially it is the second most successful album of the band, after Beyond Belief. It was certified Gold on January 23, 1998.

In November 1992, Petra released a Spanish-language version of this album called Petra en Alabanza.

== Track listing ==
1. "I Love the Lord" (lyrics by Bob Hartman) – 3:35
2. "King of Kings" (lyrics and music by Sophie Conty and Naomi Batya) – 1:47
3. "Jesus, Jesus, Glorious One" (lyrics and music by Curtis Peifer) – 2:18
4. "The Battle Belongs to the Lord" (lyrics and music by Jamie Owens-Collins) – 3:04
5. "Take Me In" (lyrics and music by Dave Browning) – 4:11
6. "Salvation Belongs to Our God" (lyrics and music by Adrian Turner and Pat Howard) – 2:56
7. "The King of Glory Shall Come In" (lyrics and music by Hartman) – 3:10
8. "No Weapon Formed Against Us" (unknown author) – 1:44
9. "I Will Celebrate/When the Spirit of the Lord" (lyrics and music by Linda Duvall) – 4:15
10. "I Will Sing Praise" (lyrics and music by Jacque DeShetler) – 2:45
11. "Hallowed Be Thy Name" (lyrics and music by Bill Ancira) – 4:12
12. "Friends (All in the Family of God)" (lyrics and music by John Wierick) – 4:20
13. "I Will Call Upon the Lord" (lyrics and music by Michael O'Shields) – 3:48
14. "We Exalt Thee" (lyrics and music by Pete Sanchez) – 3:46

== Awards ==
- Won Dove Award for Recorded Music Packaging in 1990.

== Personnel ==
Petra

- Bob Hartman – guitars, arrangements
- John Schlitt – lead vocals
- John Lawry – keyboards, background vocals, arrangements
- Ronny Cates – bass
- Louie Weaver – drums

Additional musicians

- Greg Vail – saxophone on "Friends (All In the Family of God)"
- John Elefante – background vocals
- Walt Harrah – background vocals, vocal arrangements
- Charlie Hoage – background vocals
- Cathy Riso – background vocals
- Rick Riso – background vocals
- Sara Tennison – background vocals

Production

- Bob Hartman – producer
- John Lawry – producer
- Howard Levy – engineer at The Pond, Franklin, Tennessee
- Gary Heddon – engineer at The Pond
- Dino Elefante – engineer at Recording Arts, Nashville, Tennessee, engineer and mixing at Pakaderm Studio, Los Alamitos, California, "live" at Trunks Arena
- Carl Tatz – engineer at Recording Arts
- Mike Miereau – engineer and mixing at Pakaderm Studio, "live" at Trunks Arena
- John Elefante – engineer and mixing at Pakaderm Studio, "live" at Trunks Arena
- Jeff Simmons – assistant engineer at Pakaderm Studio, "live" at Trunks Arena
- Bret Teegarden – mixing at Duckworth Studio, Nashville, Tennessee ("Take Me In" and "Hallowed Be Thy Name")
- Tommy Greer – mixing at Duckworth Studio ("Take Me In" and "Hallowed Be Thy Name")
- Mastered at Future Disc, Hollywood, California
- John Elefante – production assistant
- Dino Elefante – production assistant
- Loren Balman – cover concept
- Teri Short – cover coordinator
- Jackson Design – design
- Mark Tucker – photography

== Petra en Alabanza ==
Petra en Alabanza

Studio album by Petra
- Released: 1992
- Genres: Christian rock, praise
- Length: 42:50
- Labels: DaySpring, Word
- Producers: Bob Hartman, John Lawry

Petra chronology
Unseen Power (1991)	Petra en Alabanza (1992)	Wake-Up Call (1993)

In 1992, Petra released Petra en Alabanza, a Spanish version of Petra Praise: The Rock Cries Out. The album featured almost the same songs (except "No Weapon Formed Against Us"), translated by Juan Salinas from Producciones CanZion. Additional voices and choirs were recorded by Gerardo Hernández at Shakin' Studios in Franklin, Tennessee.

=== Track listing ===
1. "Amo Al Señor" – 3:35
2. "Rey de Reyes" – 1:47
3. "Cristo Glorioso Rey" – 2:18
4. "La Batalla Es De Nuestro Señor" – 3:04
5. "Señor Llévame A Tus Atrios" – 4:11
6. "La Salvación Es De Nuestro Dios" – 2:56
7. "El Rey De Gloria Entrará" – 3:10
8. "Yo Celebraré/El Espíritu De Dios" – 4:15
9. "Te Alabo" – 2:45
10. "Tu Nombre Santo Es" – 4:12
11. "Amigos" – 4:20
12. "Clamaré a mi Señor" – 3:48
13. "Te Exaltamos" – 3:46
