= God Fixation =

Studio album by Petra
- Released: April 21, 1998
- Genre: Christian rock
- Length: 43:02
- Label: Word, Epic
- Producer: John and Dino Elefante

Petra chronology
| Petra Praise 2: We Need Jesus (1997) | God Fixation (1998) | Double Take (2000) |

Professional ratings
Review scores
| Source | Rating |
|---|---|
| AllMusic | link |
| HM Magazine | link |

God Fixation is the seventeenth studio album of the Christian rock band, Petra. It was released on April 21, 1998.

The album features 3 new members: guitarist Pete Orta guitarist/keyboardist Kevin Brandow and bassist Lonnie Chapin. All new members worked on the music and lyrics of the new songs contributing heavily to the sound of this album, which is more modern and less driving than most of their previous work.

== Album background ==
God Fixation came to be after another major lineup change within the band. After the departure of guitarist David Lichens, bassist Ronny Cates, and keyboardist Jim Cooper, lead singer John Schlitt recruited guitarists Pete Orta and Kevin Brandow, who had been playing with him on his solo tour. They joined new bassist Lonnie Chapin in the recording of the album. According to Schlitt, the three new members worked closely with band founder Bob Hartman in the writing and recording of the album for six weeks.

Hartman, who handled most of the songwriting, was open to collaborations from the new members. Schlitt said in an interview with HM that "the music has been totally affected by the three new guys and [drummer] Louie [Weaver]. They came in with ideas, and they showed Bob, and Bob said, 'Great, I don't have to write songs anymore... All I gotta do is come up with the words.' So there were a lot of ideas from the new guys." As a result, most of the music was written by Orta, Brandow, and Chapin, along with musician Brian Wooten and producer John Elefante.

When questioned about the change in style of the band, Schlitt said "Petra wasn't selling worth a stink. Petra was going down the drain (because of internal problems), and I don't want to go down the drain yet. Personally, if it means kids are interested in a new style, I believe we can do it. If it means getting three new members to do it, I guess it has to be done."

== Track listing ==
All songs written by Bob Hartman, except where noted.

1. "If I Had to Die for Someone" (music by Chapin and John Elefante) – 4:39
2. "Hello Again" (music by Brian Wooten and Elefante) – 3:40
3. "A Matter of Time" (music by Hartman, Elefante and Wooten) – 3:24
4. "Falling Up" (music by Orta and Elefante) – 4:25
5. "Over the Horizon" (words by Chelsea Brandow, music by Orta and Elefante) – 4:37
6. "God Fixation" (music by Orta, Chapin and Elefante) – 2:54
7. "Set for Life" (music by Kevin Brandow, Wooten and Elefante) – 3:55
8. "Magnet of the World" (music by Hartman and Elefante) – 3:44
9. "Shadow of a Doubt" (music by Hartman and Elefante) – 3:27
10. "St. Augustine's Pears" – 3:48
11. "The Invitation" (music by K.Brandow, Wooten and Elefante) – 4:29

== Awards ==
The album was nominated for a Grammy Award for Best Rock Gospel Album at the 41st Grammy Awards in 1999.

== Reception ==
Professional ratings
Review scores
| Source | Rating |
|---|---|
| AllMusic | 4/5 stars |
| Jesus Freak Hideout | 4/5 stars |

The album received mixed reviews from critics and audiences. It has a rating of 3 stars at AllMusic, while Victor Sambu, of Jesus Freak Hideout, gave it 4 out of 5 stars calling it "one of Petra's most underrated albums". However, HM wrote about the album "there are a few rockers here, but pale in comparison to the band's hard rock glory days of On Fire!. Nowadays, Petra seems to remain Christian rock for kids whose parents don't let 'em listen to rock & roll." The review closes saying that "nothing groundbreaking is heard. While some may receive encouragement from the content, many a learned listener will hear a typical confirmational drivel that soaks most of Christian radio."

== Personnel ==
Petra

- John Schlitt – lead vocals, background vocals
- Pete Orta – lead guitar, rhythm guitar, background vocals
- Kevin Brandow – guitars, background vocals
- Lonnie Chapin – bass guitar, background vocals
- Louie Weaver – drums

Additional musicians

- Jeff Roach – keyboards, organ
- Bob Hartman – guitars
- George Marinelli – guitars
- Brian Wooten – guitars
- John Elefante – background vocals

Production

- John Elefante – producer
- Dino Elefante – producer
- Bob Hartman – executive producer
- J.R. McNeely – engineer, mixing (1–10) at The Sound Kitchen, Franklin, Tennessee; additional recording at The Snack Bar, Brentwood, Tennessee
- Richie Biggs – mixing (11) at The Sound Kitchen
- Tim Coyle – assistant engineer
- Todd Gunnerson – assistant engineer
- Matt Weeks – assistant engineer
- Ken Love – mastering at MasterMix, Nashville, Tennessee
- David Estes – A&R direction
- Linda Bourne Wornell – A&R coordinator
- Beth Lee – art direction
- Kevin Tucker – design, additional photography
- Robert Ashcroft – photography
