= Beyond Belief (album) =

1990 album release by Petra

Studio album by Petra
- Released: June 20, 1990
- Genres: Christian rock, hard rock
- Length: 44:00
- Labels: DaySpring; Word; A&M; Epic
- Producers: John and Dino Elefante

Petra chronology
Petra Praise: The Rock Cries Out (1989)	Beyond Belief (1990)	Unseen Power (1991)

Professional ratings
Review scores
Source	Rating
AllMusic	(not rated)
Jesus Freak Hideout	(no staff review)

Beyond Belief is the twelfth studio album of the Christian rock band, Petra. It was released on June 20, 1990.

In this album the band continues to polish the hard rock/arena rock sound the band had been working on their previous efforts before their praise album (On Fire! and This Means War!).

As of late 2011, this is the band's most successful album both critically and commercially, and it is considered by most to be the peak of their discography. The album won the band their first Grammy after five previous nominations, and was certified gold on October 3, 1995. The album was listed at No. 71 in CCM Magazine's The 100 Greatest Albums in Christian Music. The band also released a mini-movie of the same title.

== Track listing ==
All songs written by Bob Hartman, except where noted.

1. "Armed and Dangerous" – 4:06
2. "I am on the Rock" (Hartman, John Elefante) – 4:37
3. "Creed" – 4:36
4. "Beyond Belief" – 5:06
5. "Love" – 4:10
6. "Underground" (Hartman, J. Elefante) – 4:33
7. "Seen and Not Heard" – 3:54
8. "Last Daze" – 5:04
9. "What's in a Name" – 3:34
10. "Prayer" (Hartman, J. Elefante) – 4:15

== Awards ==
- Won Grammy Award for Best Rock Gospel Album in 1991.
- Won Dove Award for Long Form Music Video in 1990.
- Won Dove Award for Rock Album in 1991.
- Won Dove Award for Rock Recorded Song ("Beyond Belief") in 1991.
- Won Dove Award for Recorded Music Packaging in 1991.

== Personnel ==
Petra

- John Schlitt – lead vocals, backing vocals
- Bob Hartman – guitars, arrangements
- John Lawry – keyboards
- Ronny Cates – bass
- Louie Weaver – drums

Additional musicians

- John Andrew Schreiner – additional keyboards
- John Elefante – background vocals, arrangements
- Dino Elefante – background vocals, arrangements
- Dave Amato – background vocals
- Walt Harrah and the Los Alamitos Congregational Choir – background vocals on "Love"

Production

- John Elefante – producer, engineer, mixing at Pakaderm Studios, Los Alamitos, California
- Dino Elefante – producer, engineer, mixing at Pakaderm Studios
- Lynn Keesecker – A&R direction
- Mike Mireau – engineer
- Jeff Simmons – assistant engineer
- Bob Ludwig – mastering at Masterdisk, New York City
- Amy Linden – art production coordination
- Buddy Jackson – art direction
- Beth Middleworth – design
- Mark Tucker – photography
- Carol Buckley-Frazier – hair, make-up
- Susan Wakulsky – stylist

== Short film ==
Beyond Belief
- Directed by: Stephen Yake
- Written by: Stephen Yake; Tom Newman; Andrea Jobe; Jeff Bates
- Produced by: Stephen Yake
- Starring: Tony Leech; Jason Rogers
- Distributed by: Dayspring
- Release date: 1990
- Running time: 50 minutes
- Country: United States
- Language: English

Prior to the release of the album, Petra released a short film also called Beyond Belief. The film was produced and directed by Stephen Yake and written by Yake, Tom Newman, Andrea Jobe, and Jeff Bates.

The film features six videos of songs featured on the Beyond Belief album intercalated in the plot of the film. The members of the band also make cameo appearances during the film. The project was filmed on location in Tulsa, Oklahoma, Phoenix and Sedona, Arizona, Coos Bay, Oregon, Miami, Florida and Lima, Perú.

=== Plot ===
The film follows Chad Warren (Tony Leech), a young senior in high school, who must face the illness of his brother, David (Jason Rogers) during the summer.

While David is diagnosed with cancer, Chad must compete in a huge track and field competition to get a scholarship at Angelo State. David also insists on Chad mending his relationship with their father, who recently walked out on their family.

=== Music videos ===
The music videos included are:

- "Creed"
- "Seen And Not Heard"
- "Love"
- "Beyond Belief"
- "I Am On the Rock" (Words and music by Bob Hartman and John Elefante)
- "Armed and Dangerous"

All songs are included in the band's album Beyond Belief, and were written by the band's guitarist/founder Bob Hartman, except where noted.

=== Cast ===
- Tony Leech - Chad Warren
- Jason Rogers - David Warren
- Vicci Jo Witty - Mrs. Warren
- Bob Maras - Mr. Warren
- Monte Light - Young Chad
- Adam Maras - Young David
- Larry Smith - Coach
- Tom Holder - Chris
