= Unseen Power =

Studio album by Petra
- Released: November 1991
- Genre: Christian rock
- Length: 41:33
- Label: DaySpring, Word, Epic
- Producer: John & Dino Elefante

Petra chronology
Beyond Belief (1990)	Unseen Power (1991)	Petra en Alabanza (1992)

Professional ratings
Review scores
Source	Rating
AllMusic	4.5/5 stars

Unseen Power is the thirteenth studio album of the Christian rock band, Petra. It was released in November 1991.

The album retains a driving edge while veering away from the more commercial pop-metal sound of their previous efforts. Bob Hartman has stated that he and the producers intentionally chose to move in directions they were not instinctively inclined to go.

== Track listing ==
All songs written by Bob Hartman, except where noted.

1. "Destiny" – 4:31
2. "Who's on the Lord's Side" (words and music by Rev. Timothy Wright) – 3:54
3. "Ready, Willing and Able" – 4:14
4. "Hand on My Heart" (music by John Elefante, Hartman) – 4:26
5. "I Need to Hear from You" – 4:04
6. "Dance" (music by Elefante) – 3:46
7. "Secret Weapon" (music by Hartman, Elefante) – 4:01
8. "Sight Unseen" – 3:58
9. "Hey World" – 3:52
10. "In the Likeness of You" (words and music by John Lawry) – 4:51

== Awards ==
- Won Grammy Award for Best Rock Gospel Album in 1992.
- Won Dove Award for Rock Recorded Song ("Destiny") in 1993.

== Personnel ==
Petra

- Bob Hartman – guitars, arrangements
- John Schlitt – vocals
- John Lawry – keyboards, arrangements
- Ronny Cates – bass
- Louie Weaver – drums

Additional backing vocals

- Doug Beiden
- Ron Gollner
- Olivia McClurkin
- Alfred McCrary
- Howard McCrary
- Perry Morgan
- Tony Palacios
- Rob Rock
- Jamie Rowe
- Alfie Silas
- Rose Stone
- Sara Tennison

Production

- John Elefante – producer, arrangements, engineer at Pakaderm Studios, Los Alamitos, California, Pakaderm West, Los Alamitos, California
- Dino Elefante – producer, arrangements, engineer
- Doug Beiden – engineer, mix assistant
- J.R. McNeely – engineer, mix assistant
- Neil Kernon – mixing
- Chris Bellman – mastering at Bernie Grundman Mastering, Hollywood, California
- Lynn Keesecker – A&R direction
- Loren Balman – art direction
- Ed Goble – art direction
- Patrick Pollei – art direction, design
- Steven Fryer – design
- Michael Goldenberg – design
- Amy Linde – art production coordinator
- Jeff Katz – band and individual photos
- Neill Whitlock – cover concept photography
- Helena Occhipinti – hair
- Margaret Kimura – make-up
- Keiki Mingus – stylist
