= Revival (Petra album) =

Studio album by Petra
- Released: November 20, 2001
- Genre: Christian rock, praise
- Length: 46:04
- Label: Inpop
- Producer: Jason Halbert, Dwayne Larring

Petra chronology
Double Take (2000)	Revival (2001)	Jekyll & Hyde (2003)

Revival is the nineteenth studio album of the Christian rock band Petra and their third praise album. It was released on November 20, 2001.

== Album background ==
Revival was released amidst some major changes for the band. Three members had departed the band, so Bob Hartman decided to return from retirement to help cement the ground for their next album. Also, the band was dropped from their label (Word/Epic) which started a search for a suitable record label to launch their next album.

Inpop Records picked the band up and prepared for their next release. It was decided by both the band and producers that the best way to follow was a third praise album. They also decided that, instead of hiring new members, they would stay with remaining core members (John Schlitt, Louie Weaver, Bob Hartman) and use studio musicians for bass and keyboards.

The music features a more electric and synthesized sound, using heavy programming and sampling without sacrificing Hartman's guitar sounds or Weaver's rhythm. This is the only album of Petra that does not feature a song written by founder Bob Hartman.

== Reception ==
Professional ratings
Review scores
Source	Rating
AllMusic	4/5 stars
Jesus Freak Hideout	3.5/5 stars

The album was well received by audience and critics. John DiBiase, of Jesus Freak Hideout, called the album "a bold and brilliant step" for the band, and gave it 3.5 out of stars. Billboard magazine wrote "the group records songs brilliantly" and called the album "a reminder of why [Petra] will celebrate its 30th anniversary next year".

== Track listing ==
1. "Send Revival, Start With Me" (Words by Matt Redman) – 5:29
2. "The Noise We Make" (Words by Jesse Reeves and Chris Tomlin) – 5:05
3. "Oasis" (Words by John Hartley and Gary Sadler) – 3:56
4. "The Prodigal's Song" (Words by Paul Oakley) – 4:16
5. "Amazing Grace" (Words by Sadler, Hartley and Dwayne Larring) – 4:03
6. "Jesus, Friend of Sinners" (Words by Oakley) – 3:32
7. "Better Is One Day" (Words by Redman) – 4:36
8. "Meet With Me" (Words by Lamont Hiebert) – 3:28
9. "You Satisfy" (Words by Peter Gross and Ashlee White) – 4:26
10. "We Want to See Jesus Lifted High" (Words by Doug Horley) – 3:02
11. "How Long" (Words by Stuart Townend) – 4:06

== Personnel ==
Petra

- John Schlitt – lead vocals, backing vocals
- Bob Hartman – guitars, additional backing vocals
- Louie Weaver – drums

Additional musicians

- Jason Halbert – keyboards, programming, additional backing vocals
- Dwayne Larring – guitars
- Rick Cua – bass
- David Larring
- Kevin Walt
- David Angell – strings (1)
- Monisa Angell – strings (1)
- John Catchings – strings (1)
- David Davidson – strings (1), string arrangements (1)

Production

- Steve Ford – executive producer
- Jason Halbert – producer, engineer
- Dwayne Larring – producer, engineer
- Marc Chevalier – engineer at The Bennett House, Franklin, Tennessee, The Refuge, Franklin, Tennessee, and House of Bob Studio, Franklin, Tennessee; The Junction, Pasadena, California
- Bob Hartman – additional engineer
- David Streit – assistant engineer
- Jacquire King – mixing at The Refuge, Franklin, Tennessee and EMI Studios, Brentwood, Tennessee
- Richard Dodd – mastering at Vital Studios, Nashville, Tennessee
- Dan Lessler – mastering assistant
- TH – art direction, design, layout
- Ben Pearson – photography
- Robin Geary – hair, make-up
- Dana Salsedo – stylist
