= No Doubt (Petra album) =

Studio album by Petra
- Released: August 1995
- Genre: Christian rock
- Length: 47:47
- Label: Word, Epic
- Producer: John & Dino Elefante

Petra chronology
Wake-Up Call (1993)	No Doubt (1995)	Petra Praise 2: We Need Jesus (1997)

Professional ratings
Review scores
Source	Rating
AllMusic	4.5/5 stars

No Doubt is the fifteenth studio album of the Christian rock band, Petra. It was released in August 1995.

The tone of the album is more pop-oriented than any previous release featuring Schlitt. Most of the rock songs lack the driving edge of their previous albums, and the sonic field is no longer flooded with distorted guitars, leaning more toward a calculated, radio-friendly sound.

All the guitars in the album were played by founder Bob Hartman. However, since he had quit touring with the band before the release of the album, new guitarist David Lichens was enlisted to travel with the band and appeared in the album art and promotional pictures.

The album also featured another new member, keyboardist Jim Cooper. Cooper was a keyboard technician for former keyboardist John Lawry for several years. When Lawry retired, Cooper replaced him.

== Track listing ==
All songs written by Bob Hartman, except where noted.

1. "Enter In" – 5:00
2. "Think Twice" – 4:19
3. "Heart of a Hero" (words by Brian Wooten) – 4:10
4. "More Than a Thousand Words" – 4:58
5. "No Doubt" – 4:54
6. "Right Place" – 3:38
7. "Two Are Better Than One" – 3:43
8. "Sincerely Yours" – 4:16
9. "Think on These Things" – 4:24
10. "For All You're Worth" (words by Jim Cooper) – 4:14
11. "We Hold Our Hearts Out to You" – 4:11

== Awards ==
- Nominated for Grammy Award for Best Rock Gospel Album in 1995.
- Won Dove Award for Rock Album in 1996.

== Personnel ==
Petra

- John Schlitt – lead vocals, background vocals
- Jim Cooper – keyboards, background vocals
- Bob Hartman – all guitars
- Ronny Cates – bass, background vocals
- Louie Weaver – drums

Additional musicians

- John Elefante – additional keyboards, string arrangements
- Tom Howard – string arrangements and conductor
- The Nashville String Machine – strings
- Chris Rodriguez – background vocals
- Micah Wilshire – background vocals

Production

- John Elefante – producer, engineer at The Sound Kitchen, Franklin, Tennessee
- Dino Elefante – producer, engineer at The Sound Kitchen
- Bob Hartman – executive producer
- Lynn Keesecker – A&R direction
- Bubba Smith – A&R direction
- David Murphy – string recording at Great Circle Sound, Nashville, Tennessee
- Steve Marcantonio – mixing (1–4, 6, 7, 9)
- Terry Christian – mixing (5, 8, 10, 11)
- Hank Williams – mastering at MasterMix, Nashville, Tennessee
- P.J. Marx – guitar technician
- Chuck Nelson – art direction
- Lyndie Wenner – art direction
- Chris Ferrara – design
- Ben Pearson – photography
