= Double Take (Petra album) =

Studio album by Petra
- Released: February 29, 2000
- Genre: Christian rock
- Length: 51:55
- Labels: Word, Epic
- Producers: John & Dino Elefante

Petra chronology
God Fixation (1998)	Double Take (2000)	Revival (2001)

Double Take is the Grammy Award winning, eighteenth studio album of the Christian rock band Petra. It was released on February 29, 2000.

The album features 10 new acoustic rearrangements of classic Petra songs. It also features two new songs ("Breathe In" and "The Longing"). The song "Breathe In" is sung by guitarist Pete Orta. It was written completely by him.

This is the only album to feature Trent Thomason on keyboards.

== Album background ==
Double Take features new rearrangements of ten classic Petra songs. The new arrangements are more modern and acoustic-oriented. According to lead singer John Schlitt, the purpose of the record is "not to compete. It's to reintroduce to a generation that never heard any of these songs". Schlitt also said that the songs were "designed" to be played on radio.

The album is not fully acoustic, and features orchestration on several of the songs. Additionally, there are two new songs: "The Longing" and "Breathe In". The former was written by Joel Hanson (from PFR) while the latter was written and sung by guitarist Pete Orta.

== Track listing ==
All songs written by Bob Hartman, except where noted.

1. "Judas' Kiss" – 4:05
2. "The Coloring Song" (words by David Eden) – 3:28
3. "Dance" (words by Hartman and John Elefante) – 3:39
4. "Beyond Belief" (words by Hartman and Elefante) – 4:22
5. "The Longing" (words by Joel Hanson and Tony Wood) – 2:56
6. "He Came, He Saw" (words by Hartman and Elefante) – 4:14
7. "Beat the System" – 4:34
8. "This Means War" – 5:40
9. "Breathe In" (words by Pete Orta) – 4:57
10. "Creed" – 4:49
11. "Praying Man" (words by John Lawry and Jim Cooper) – 4:30
12. "Just Reach Out" (words by John Schlitt and Rich Gootee) – 4:36

== Awards ==
Double Take won a Grammy for Best Rock Gospel Album at the 43rd Grammy Awards in 2001.

== Reception ==
Professional ratings
Review scores
Source	Rating
AllMusic	2.5/5 stars

The album received mostly mixed to negative reviews from audience and critics. AllMusic gave it a rating of 2.5 stars out of 5 while David Cranson, of Cross Rhythms, gave it 3 out of 10 stars. Cranson wrote "they’ve got most of the arrangements wrong. Too negative in feel, too minor rather than major... The only tracks which really work are the two new ones".

However, Michael Jones, of the fan website A Guide to Petra, called it "something that is not to be missed" and "a bit more artsy, a bit more acoustic, and at the same time a bit more progressive than they have been. It is also some of their best quality work in many years". Jones closed his review asking Petra fans to "check their expectations at the door" to avoid being disappointed by the new versions of classic songs.

== Personnel ==
Petra

- John Schlitt – lead vocals
- Pete Orta – lead guitars, background vocals, lead vocals (9)
- Trent Thomason – keyboards
- Lonnie Chapin – bass, background vocals
- Louie Weaver – drums

Additional musicians

- Larry Hall – keyboards
- George Marinelli Jr. – guitars
- Brian Wooten – guitars
- Eric Darken – percussion
- Terry McMillan – harmonica solo
- Russell Mauldin – string arrangements and conductor
- The Nashville String Machine – strings
- John Elefante – background vocals

== Production ==
- Bob Hartman – executive producer
- John Elefante – producer, vocal recording
- Dino Elefante – producer
- J.R. McNeely – engineer, mixing (2, 4, 9, 10)
- David Hall – mixing (1, 3, 5–8, 11, 12)
- Robert Charles – assistant engineer
- Todd Gunnerson – assistant engineer
- Thomas Johnson – assistant engineer
- Hank Williams – mastering at MasterMix, Nashville, Tennessee
- Beth Lee – art direction
- Brian Smith – design
- Anderson Thomas Design, Inc. – design
- PhotoDisc – photography

Studios

- recorded and mixed at The Sound Kitchen, Franklin, Tennessee
- vocals recorded at The Fish Bowl, Brentwood, Tennessee
