= Petra Praise 2: We Need Jesus =

Studio album by Petra
- Released: February 18, 1997
- Genre: Christian rock, praise
- Length: 46:41
- Label: Word, Epic
- Producer: John & Dino Elefante

Petra chronology
No Doubt (1995)	Petra Praise 2: We Need Jesus (1997)	God Fixation (1998)

Professional ratings
Review scores
Source	Rating
AllMusic	4/5 stars
Jesus Freak Hideout	4/5 stars

Petra Praise 2: We Need Jesus is the sixteenth studio album of the Christian rock band Petra and their second praise album. It was released on February 18, 1997.

The album was released amidst some major line-up changes in the band, and it features contributions of several musicians. It's the first album to feature Lonnie Chapin on bass guitar, who would become the band's full-time bassist until 2001.

The music is a mixture of traditional and original praise songs with a rock style. It is considered to be more diverse musically than the band's first, straight forward hard rock, praise album. Most of the original songs were penned by band founder Bob Hartman (except "Song of Moses" that was written by former keyboardist Jim Cooper and well-known musician Brian Wooten).

The title song features lead singer John Schlitt pairing up with producer and fellow singer John Elefante and singer Lou Gramm (from Foreigner).

== Track listing ==
All songs written by Bob Hartman, except where noted.

1. "Song of Moses, Rev. – 15:3-4" (words & music by Jim Cooper and Brian Wooten) – 4:17
2. "Lord, I Lift Your Name on High" (Words & Music by Rick Founds) – 3:02
3. "Be of Good Cheer" – 3:55
4. "Show Your Power" (words & music by Kevin Prosch) – 4:10
5. "I Love You Lord" (words & music by Laurie Klein) – 3:53
6. "The Holiest Name" – 3:34
7. "Let Our Voices Rise Like Incense" (words & music by Linda Whitmer-Bell) – 2:29
8. "Ancient of Days" (words & music by Gary Sadler and Jamie Harvill)– 3:52
9. "I Waited For The Lord on High" (words & music by Bill Batstone) – 2:47
10. "Lovely Lord" – 4:25
11. Medley – 5:58
  - "Only by Grace" (words & music by Gerrit Gustafson)
  - "To Him Who Sits on the Throne" (words & music by Debbye Graafsma)
  - "You Are Holy" (words & music by Scott Wesley Brown)
12. "We Need Jesus" (words & music by Scott Springer, John & Dino Elefante) – 4:14

== Awards ==
- Nominated for a Grammy Award for Best Pop/Contemporary Gospel Album in 1997.
- Won a Dove Award for Praise and Worship album in 1998.

== Personnel ==
Petra

- John Schlitt – lead vocals, background vocals
- Bob Hartman – lead guitars
- David Lichens – guitars
- Lonnie Chapin – bass guitar, background vocals
- Louie Weaver – drums

Guest musicians

- Jeff "Max" Roach
- Gary Burnette
- Scott Denté
- George Marinelli
- Matt Pierson
- Dan Needham
- Crys – background vocals
- Lisa C. – background vocals
- Lissa – background vocals
- John Elefante – background vocals, additional lead vocals on "We Need Jesus"
- Lou Gramm – additional lead vocals on "We Need Jesus"

Production

- Bob Hartman – executive producer
- John Elefante – producer
- Dino Elefante – producer, engineer at The Sound Kitchen, Franklin, Tennessee
- Joe Baldridge – engineer
- Richie Biggs – overdub engineer at The Border, Franklin, Tennessee; Battery Studios, Nashville, Tennessee; and The Snack Bar, Brentwood, Tennessee
- Tim Coyle – assistant engineer
- Daryl Roudebush – assistant engineer
- David Thoener – mixing at The Sound Kitchen (1, 4, 5, 10, 11, 12)
- Steve Marcantonio – mixing at The Sound Kitchen (2, 3, 6, 9)
- Bob Ludwig – mastering at Gateway Mastering, Portland, Maine
- Christy Coxe – executive art direction
- Kerosene Halo – art direction, design
- Mark Smalling – photography
