= Pete Orta =

American musician

Pete Thelonious Orta (born August 26, 1971) is a Christian rock singer, guitarist, and songwriter and music producer. He was a member of Christian rock band Petra from 1996 to 2000.

Born in Port Lavaca, Orta moved to Lubbock at age six. Despite the roughly 540-mile initial relocation from south to north Texas, Orta's family kept moving within Lubbock city limits. Orta attended Haynes Elementary School, Mackenzie Junior High School, Evans Middle School, Matthews Junior High School and Lubbock High School before graduating from Coronado High School.

Orta was given his first guitar—a red, no-brand toy—by his aunt when he was four, which he taught himself to play.

At age 18, Orta left home, and although he had a job, he couldn't afford to pay both rent and for the black Steinberger guitar he had financed from Jent's House of Music. Choosing his guitar over a home, he lived in his car, slept in open churches and showered at the YMCA for a year. He eventually landed a job at Jent's, where he fell under the tutelage of co-worker and revered local guitarist, John Ellis. Ellis was surprised by Orta's melodic lines and fast playing ability, which he says often don't go hand in hand. He was also surprised that Orta had never heard of music greats, like Jimi Hendrix, Led Zeppelin or Van Halen, all of which he had been deprived of hearing as a child with no electronics made available to him.

In 1996, Orta moved to Nashville and joined Petra; he contributed to the band's success in the late 90s. His awards include a Gold Record, a Dove Award, three Grammy Nominations and for Gospel Rock Album of the year was presented a Grammy in the year 2000 for the award-winning album, Double Take.

Petra's single Breathe In on Petra's Double Take. album, which attracted the attention of Word/Sony Records A&R staff and eventually led to the Recording of his first solo record Born Again. In 2000, Orta left Petra and embarked on a solo career and was inducted with Petra, into the Gospel Music Hall of Fame and also had his guitars inducted in Hard Rock Cafes around the world. In 2001, prior to the release of his album, friend and label mate singer Jaci Velasquez invited Orta to tour as her guitar player on her Crystal Clear Tour where she featured him in a step out solo performance and he was presented another Gold Record, this time while touring with Velasquez. Soon after, Orta recorded a duet with Jaci on her 2001 Christmas release Season of Love. In 2001, his solo album, Born Again on Word Records was finally released to rave reviews and rock radio success, which culminated in a 2002 Dove Award Nomination for Rock Recorded Song of the Year.

In late 2001, Orta performed as part of the all-star chorus of CCM artists who recorded the 9/11 tribute song, "In God We Trust," penned by Mark Heimermann and Wayne Kirkpatrick and commissioned by the Gospel Music Association.

Aside from Velasquez, Orta has performed on the albums of other CCM artists, including Tammy Trent, Steven Delopoulos, and Rachel Lampa. He also rearranged and performed Jimmie Dale Gilmore's "Braver Newer World" for use in the 2002 motion picture Joshua.

In 2005, Orta produced the debut album from Jaci Velasquez's record label, Apostrophe, by Michael Cook called Imprint Orta also contributed his production techniques to the soundtrack for the Left Behind: World at War soundtrack.

Apart from Jaci Velasquez, Orta has worked with other artist including: Jack Blades, Desmond Child, Tommy Sims, Michael W. Smith, Tony Rich, The Waiting, Guardian, Chris Rodriguez, Trey Bruce, Rosas Divinas, Pete Kipley and David Rice.

In 2023, P. Thelonious Orta is married to Tabitha Orta and lives with his family in North Texas. He oil paints professionally, consults and writes.
