= John Schlitt =

American singer (born 1950)

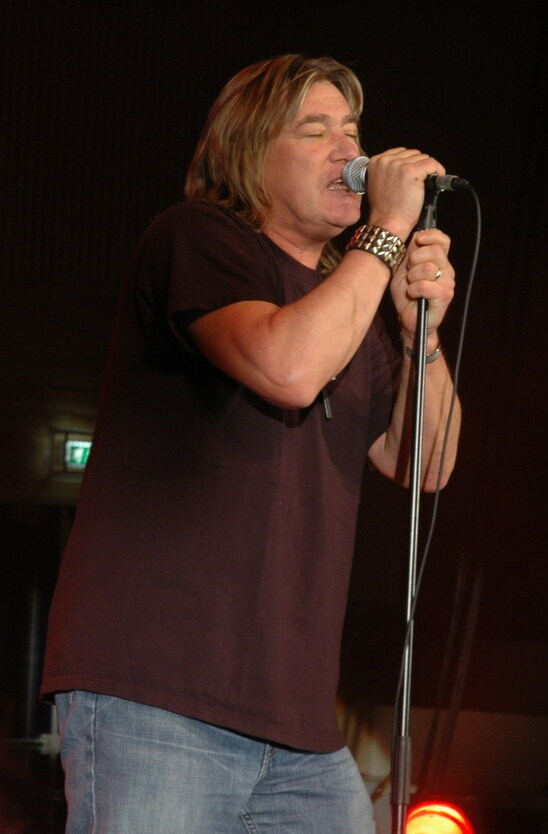

Background information
- Born: John William Schlitt; February 3, 1950 (age 76)
- Origin: Lincoln, Illinois, U.S.
- Genres: Rock; contemporary Christian music
- Occupation: Singer
- Years active: 1972–present
- Website: johnwschlitt.com

John William Schlitt (born February 3, 1950) is an American singer, who was the lead singer of the Christian rock band Petra from 1986 until the band's retirement in early 2006. Prior to joining Petra in 1986, Schlitt was the lead vocalist for Head East until retiring from the band in 1980.

== Biography ==
=== Early years ===
John Schlitt was born in Lincoln, Illinois northeast of Springfield, Illinois. Shortly afterwards, his family moved to Mt. Pulaski where he grew up. He began singing and showed musical talent from a very young age. When he was 13, he joined a band called Vinegar Hills Hometown Band Something Different. He went to Mt. Pulaski High School and graduated in 1968. He and Dorla Froelich, his future wife, met at high school.

After graduating from high school, Schlitt enrolled at the University of Illinois pursuing a degree in civil engineering. However, his main interest continued to be music. In 1972, he joined Head East, a rock band, as the lead singer with fellow students of the university. Juggling his musical career and college studies, Schlitt finally graduated from college in 1974 and dedicated himself full-time to his career in music.

=== Head-East era and aftermath ===
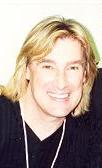
Schlitt in Cabo Rojo, Puerto Rico for a solo performance in 1998

While with Head East, the band had several hits during the 70s. They released five studio albums and a live album. However, during that time, he developed a dependency on cocaine and alcohol. He was fired from the band in March 1980. Then, Schlitt formed a short-lived band, "Johnny", with his brother Jeff Schlitt, Don Colluci, Jim McNeely, Troy Tipton, Mike Willis, and Burk Burkhardt, but the band fell apart as his addiction intensified in a six-month depression during which he "came very close to suicide". During that time, however, his wife became a born-again Christian and convinced Schlitt to see her pastor. Schlitt confesses that he had already decided to end his life and agreed to the meeting only "so my wife would be able to say ‘he tried’ after I was gone."

Schlitt also became a born-again Christian. He decided to leave music and rededicate his life to his family. Afterwards, he worked cleaning the floors at a factory and slowly rose through the ranks until he became a mining engineer for a mining construction company. Finally, he became their cost and scheduling engineer. During that time, Schlitt attended Gethsemane Church in Evansville, Indiana where he sang with the worship team.

Thirty-one years after being kicked out of Head East, Schlitt appeared with the band again to mark the band's 2011 induction into the Iowa Rock N Roll Music Association Hall of Fame. He was joined by former Head East drummer Steve Huston along with the band's keyboardist Roger Boyd.

=== Petra era ===
Five years after being in Head East, Bob Hartman called him and asked him to audition for Christian rock band Petra. Petra had just lost its lead singer Greg X. Volz, who had left to pursue a solo career. After a session with Hartman (band's co-founder and guitarist), he was asked to join the band. Schlitt's first show with the band was on February 3, 1986 beginning a career of nearly two decades with them. His first album with the band was their 1986 album Back to the Street.

While he was with Petra, the band released two RIAA certified Gold albums (Beyond Belief and Petra Praise: The Rock Cries Out) and earned four Grammy and numerous Dove Awards. They went to all 50 states in the U.S. traveling to over 35 countries.

=== Solo career ===
During breaks from performing in Petra, Schlitt recorded and released two solo albums: Shake in 1995, and Unfit For Swine in 1996. Both albums were moderately successful and received positive reviews. After Petra retired in 2005, Schlitt and Hartman started II Guys From Petra. An album was released on January 26, 2007 titled Vertical Expressions. Hartman and Schlitt have performed several shows promoting the album.

In addition, Schlitt released his third solo project, The Grafting, on January 22, 2008. Dan Needham, Schlitt's son-in-law, produced the album. The album was released with performances of the tracks "The Grafting" and "Only Men" by Schlitt on the program Celebrations. Daystar Television Network aired it internationally. In May 2008, Schlitt performed eight concerts in six cities in India with an all-new backing band, StoneJava. He played songs from his solo albums along with many Petra favorites to positive reviews. In 2012, he released his fourth solo project, titled The Greater Cause, on 4K Records. Needham was the album's producer again. Hope That Saves The World was in the top 30 on the Billboard and Christian Weekly charts in July 2012. In 2019, Schlitt released his sixth studio album, Go.

Schlitt has received multiple Gold Records, Grammys, and Dove Awards during his career. As the lead singer of Petra, he was inducted into the Gospel Music Hall of Fame.GospelMusicChannel.com later described him as one of the most recognizable male vocalists in Christian rock music.

=== Post-Petra era ===
Schlitt is active today singing in various projects and bands including Project Damage Control, a Christian progressive hard rock band. He is the lead vocalist of a band, The Union of Sinners and Saints, with White Heart founder, guitarist, and songwriter Billy Smiley. Schlitt is a vocalist with the Jay Sekulow Band. He released a single, "Fighting the Fight", in February 2019, which he wrote with Ryan Horn. It was produced by John Lawry.

== Personal life ==
Schlitt and his wife, Dorla have been married since August 28, 1971. They have four children and live in Franklin, Tennessee.

== Discography ==
=== Solo ===
Release date	Title	Label
1995	Shake	Word Records/Epic Records
1996	Unfit for Swine	Word
2008	The Grafting	4K
2012	The Greater Cause	4K
2013	The Christmas Project	4K
2020	Go	Girder

=== with The Union of Sinners & Saints ===
Release date	Title	Label
2016	The Union of Sinners & Saints	Cul De Sac Records & Suite 28 Records

=== with II Guys From Petra ===
Release date	Title	Label
2007	Vertical Expressions	Petra Productions

=== with Petra ===
Release date	Title	Label
1986	Back to the Street	Star Song Records
1987	This Means War!	Star Song Records
1988	On Fire!	Star Song Records
1989	Petra Praise: The Rock Cries Out	DaySpring Records; Word Records; Epic Records
1990	Beyond Belief	DaySpring Records; Word Records; Epic Records
1991	Unseen Power	DaySpring Records; Word Records; Epic Records
1992	Petra en Alabanza	DaySpring Records; Word Records; Epic Records
1993	Wake-Up Call	DaySpring Records; Word Records; Epic Records
1995	No Doubt	Word Records; Epic Records
1997	Petra Praise 2: We Need Jesus	Word Records; Epic Records
1998	God Fixation	Word Records; Epic Records
2000	Double Take	Word Records; Epic Records
2001	Revival	Inpop Records; EMI Records
2003	Jekyll & Hyde	Inpop Records; EMI Records
2004	Jekyll & Hyde en Español	Inpop Records; EMI Records
2005	Petra Farewell	Inpop Records; EMI Records
2026	Hope (Petra album)	Girder Music

=== with Head East ===
Release date	Title	Label
1974	Flat as a Pancake	A&M Records
1976	Get Yourself Up	A&M Records
1977	Gettin' Lucky	A&M Records
1978	Head East	A&M Records
1979	Head East Live	A&M Records
1979	A Different Kind of Crazy	A&M Records

=== Other contributions ===
- Geoff Moore & The Distance - "A Place to Stand" (1988)
- Steve Camp - "Justice" (1988)
- John Lawry - "Media Alert" (1990)
- Carman - "Our Turn Now" (1991)
- 4Him - "The Ride Comes Alive" (1995)
- Morgan Cryar - "What Sin?" (1998)
- Silers Bald - "Real Life" (2003)
- Everlife (2004)
- John DeGroff - "SALT" (2018)
- Neal Morse - Jesus Christ the Exorcist (2018)
