= Petra (band) =

American Christian rock band

- Petra lineup in 2003. (From left) Greg Bailey, Bob Hartman, John Schlitt, and Paul Simmons.

Background information
- Origin: Fort Wayne, Indiana, U.S.
- Genres: Christian rock, hard rock, contemporary Christian music, country rock (early)
- Years active: 1972–2006, 2013–present
- Labels: Word; Star Song; Inpop; Myrrh; DaySpring; Epic; EMI
- Members: Bob Hartman; John Lawry; John Schlitt; Greg Bailey; Cristian Borneo
- Past members: John DeGroff; Bill Glover; Greg Hough; Greg X. Volz; Rob Frazier; Mike Martin; Tommy Bolles; Steve Schneider; Jym Dingler; Louie Weaver; Mark Kelly; John Slick; Ronny Cates; Jim Cooper; David Lichens; Lonnie Chapin; Pete Orta; Kevin Brandow; Trent Thomason; Bryce Bell; Paul Simmons; Quinton Gibson
- Website: petraband.com

Petra is an American music group regarded as a pioneer of the Christian rock and contemporary Christian music genres and was, for many years, regarded as the "world's most popular Christian rock band". Formed in 1972, the band took its name from the Greek word for "rock". Though Petra disbanded formally in 2006, incarnations have played reunion shows in the years since and released two albums in November 2010, and in November 2017. In 2013, the band reformed with a new drummer, Cristian Borneo, and recorded a new song titled "Holy is Your Name", before going back on tour.

With a style initially similar to The Eagles and Lynyrd Skynyrd, Petra's sound evolved into a more energetic, driving rock sound in the early 1980s akin to Foreigner, Styx and Journey. Throughout the 1980s and early 1990s, Petra was one of the world's most popular Christian rock bands. Albums regularly sold in the hundreds of thousands, and regularly placed songs at the top of Christian radio charts while being a busy live act rivaling Amy Grant in audience popularity. With its lyrics, music and style, Petra influenced numerous other artists at a time when Christian rock experienced strong opposition from those Christians who opposed rock music with a spiritual message.

In more than three decades, Petra experienced numerous lineup changes with no members common across every incarnation. They 20 studio albums, as well as two Spanish-language and two live albums. In total Petra sold nearly 10 million records, while being nominated for 13 Grammy Awards, winning four, and winning 10 Dove Awards. Its biggest hit, "The Coloring Song", reached the top position on three Christian radio charts simultaneously. Petra was the first rock band inducted into the Gospel Music Hall of Fame and the first Christian band whose memorabilia was included in the Hard Rock Cafe restaurant chain.

Petra announced its retirement in 2005, launching a farewell tour that was recorded for release on CD and DVD. Petra's 33-year career ended with a performance in the early hours of January 1, 2006, in Murphy, North Carolina. However, the band has continued to perform sporadically since then.

In November 2010, an incarnation of the band's mid-1980s lineup performed under the name Classic Petra. They released an album, Back to the Rock, featuring one new song ("Too Big To Fail"), one song taken from Greg X. Volz's 2009 album God Only Knows, ("Back To The Rock"), as well as re-recordings of hits from that era. The band released a companion live CD and DVD in 2011. Back to the Rock II was released in 2017, under the name CPR. In 2023, the band celebrated its 50th anniversary with a US and world tour.

Their album Hope, was released on January 5, 2026, their first full-length studio record in two decades.

== Musical style ==
Petra's style changed significantly over the decades, in an effort to remain relevant to the youth it was trying to reach, but it remained within the rock genre. At its inception, the band's style was eclectic, borrowing from musical influences as diverse as The Eagles, Lynyrd Skynyrd and Kansas. Early albums featured electric double-guitar leads reminiscent of the Allman Brothers Band.

In the 1980s, the band began using keyboards and synthesizers to complement its guitar-based rock. Early in the decade, Petra produced a straightforward pop/rock sound reminiscent of Foreigner and Styx while increasingly using synthesizers and electronic effects as the decade progressed. By the late 1980s, Petra used a change in vocalists to embrace a guitar-based hard rock style similar to Def Leppard, Aerosmith and Journey – a style that, along with the growing popularity of Christian rock as a whole, led to Petra's peak success. The arena rock-influenced Beyond Belief, produced by Dino and John Elefante, was their most commercial album, Louder Sound called the sound "nothing short of monstrous" in a retrospective story about Christian AOR in 2023.

With the rise of alternative rock in the mid-1990s, the band's albums subsequently featured an increasing reliance on acoustic guitars and mellower tunes, including a fully acoustic album. Petra returned to its roots with a hard rock album in 2003, while the 2010 Classic Petra reunion was billed as an effort to re-record some of the band's early 1980s hits "with a modern edge". It included two new songs that fit within the guitar- and keyboard-based rock style that marked much of the band's early career.

== History ==
=== 1972–1979: Inception ===
In the early 1970s, songwriter and guitarist Bob Hartman met bassist John DeGroff and formed the band Dove, which he quickly disbanded when DeGroff left to attend a Bible school in Fort Wayne, Indiana, known as the Christian Training Center. Hartman soon followed, and in 1972 he and DeGroff joined two classmates, guitarist Greg Hough and drummer Bill Glover, to form Petra. The band played small Midwest venues such as churches, coffeehouses and parks, to share the message of Christianity with concertgoers. Glover said on an interview "we weren't picky and we wanted to get God's Word out to our peers. We would set up in parking lots, parks, college campuses, coffee houses, etc." A frequent venue was a Fort Wayne Christian-themed coffeehouse named The Adam's Apple.

This mix of evangelism with rock placed Petra among the early pioneers of Jesus Music, part of the larger counterculture Jesus Movement of the late 1960s and early 1970s. Church authorities struggled with and frequently opposed the use of churches for rock concerts, and few Christian radio stations, with the exception of some college-based signals, would play the band's songs. Petra was criticized for its rock sound, a hint of the opposition it would experience as its popularity grew.

==== Petra (1974) ====
Petra's blend of style and message attracted the attention of the newly created Myrrh Records' Paul Craig Paino, who convinced the label's founder, Billy Ray Hearn, to attend one of the band's concerts at The Adam's Apple. Hearn signed Petra in 1973 to record its debut album, which Hearn produced. Hearn later said he knew Petra was "the most radical thing around ... as far out as anything that had come out until that time."

With no lead vocalist, Hartman and Hough shared singing duties on the self-titled debut, which was released in 1974. Featuring "tight, Allman Brothers-type dual guitar lines and riffs", Petra also featured the comical country tune "Lucas McGraw", which became something of a cult classic, and the seminal "Backslidin' Blues", the first contemporary Christian blues song put on vinyl. The rarity of being a Christian rock band led to larger concerts and greater popularity, and Myrrh asked Petra to record a second album aimed principally at non-Christians, reflecting the evangelistic nature of the band's shows.

==== Come and Join Us (1977) ====
In 1976, Glover had resigned from the band. He was replaced by a string of drummers which included a childhood friend of Hough, Bob Rickman, and Glover's cousin, Mark Richards. However, by the time their record deal for the second album went through, Richards had already left, and Petra decided to hire Glover as a studio musician.

By Hartman's admission, his vocal style did not match well with the band's genre, and Petra brought in a number of guest vocalists for the second record, among them former e vocalist Greg X. Volz (that band's name being a lower-case abbreviation of "Emmanuel"). Volz took the lead vocals on two songs and backed up several others. Among Volz's songs was a cover of the Argent anthem "God Gave Rock and Roll to You", which Myrrh had hoped to release as a radio single to the secular market. The song was immediately controversial – and revolutionary. "It was the boldest statement anyone in Christian music had made until that time," said Ambassador Artist Agency president Wes Yoder. "This was a radical notion, especially in the minds of the leaders of conservative churches." Other guest singers featured in the album were Steve Camp, Karen Morrison, and Austin Roberts.

The recording process also was marked by disputes: the label refused Hartman's request to name the album God Gave Rock and Roll to You while a bluesy, crowd-favorite track written by Hartman about rejecting the pre-Christian self, "Killing My Old Man", was deemed too controversial and cut from the album (the song would later appear on the album Never Say Die). With a harder-edged sound reminiscent of Led Zeppelin and Deep Purple, Come and Join Us was released in 1977. It failed to sell well, however, and Myrrh dropped Petra from its label.

==== Washes Whiter Than (1979) ====
The next year, the band experienced the first of its numerous lineup changes, as Hough left to form his own band, and DeGroff followed suit, leaving Hartman and newly hired guitarist/keyboardist/vocalist Rob Frazier. The duo began work on the band's third album despite the lack of a record deal. Not having a steady drummer at the time, Hartman turned to Volz for drumming and vocal help. Already entertaining an offer from REO Speedwagon to be that band's lead singer, Volz accepted Hartman's offer instead. With a band intact, touring continuing and writing begun for a new record, Petra found itself at a crossroads: Its Christian lyrics limited the number of non-Christians attending its concerts, while its hard edge likewise limited its Christian audience.

Petra's performances soon attracted the notice of another newly formed label, Star Song Records, which inked the band for its third album. Recording began after a nine-month sabbatical during which its members considered what direction Petra should take. Upon returning, Hartman, Frazier and Volz worked with a host of studio musicians to record Washes Whiter Than, a ballad-heavy soft-rock album that drew criticism from fans of the band's previous hard-edged style when it was released in 1979. Lyrically, the band shifted from overt evangelism to encouraging the young Christians who made up the bulk of its audience. The album resulted in the band's first radio hit, "Why Should the Father Bother?" Along with garnering Petra radio success for the first time, Washes Whiter Than's musical depth established the band's artistic credibility, proving Petra could play multiple styles of music and appeal to more than just the "radicals" in Christiandom.

=== 1980–1985: The Greg X. Volz era ===
Though the band had scored a hit – "Why Should the Father Bother?" was the 16th-biggest Christian radio single of 1979 – Washes Whiter Than was not a big seller, thanks largely to distribution problems that left many copies of the record out of stores until demand for the product had subsided. Still in search of a breakthrough record and restricted by finances from touring nationally, Frazier left the band, leaving just Hartman and Volz, whom Hartman had hired as the full-time lead vocalist. With no record sales, no way to promote the albums nationally and barely any band, Hartman considered breaking up Petra.

Instead Hartman met Mark Kelly, a former lead vocalist and bassist for the band One Accord, and keyboardist John Slick at a Bible study and, after setting up a jam session, hired them to join him and Volz. Yet the two most important additions Petra made in 1980 did not play an instrument or sing a note for the band.

With Petra having established its radio bona fides and refocused its lyrical message, Star Song looked for a producer who could take the band's fourth album back to its hard rock roots, hiring Jonathan David Brown, who had successfully produced albums with radio hits by fellow Jesus Music bands Daniel Amos, Sweet Comfort Band and Parable. Additionally, Petra hired Mark Hollingsworth, who had experience in the secular music industry, to manage and promote the band.

==== Never Say Die (1981) ====
The Coloring Song
"The Coloring Song," originally written for lead singer Greg Volz's old band, catapulted Petra into the forefront of contemporary Christian music by topping three radio charts and reaching the top five of a fourth. This version is excerpted from Volz's special appearance at the band's farewell concert in late 2005.

The four band members and studio drummer Keith Edwards recorded Never Say Die and released it in 1981, with the first single a song originally written and performed by Volz's old band. "The Coloring Song" was Petra's big break, rocketing to the top of three Christian radio charts (rock, adult contemporary, inspirational) and reaching the top five of a fourth (southern gospel). Other songs – including the haunting "For Annie", a song about teen suicide; the rocking "Chameleon"; and the controversial "Killing My Old Man" – became audience favorites.

Sporting a heavier, more polished sound in the vein of Foreigner, Styx or Kansas, Never Say Die became the breakthrough album for which the band and its label had hoped, receiving rave reviews. CCM Magazine compared the band's new sound to Boston's, praising the album's lyrical and musical content and calling Never Say Die "by far their finest to date."

Ultimately, "The Coloring Song" became the third-hottest song on Christian radio in 1982 and the 14th-highest-ranked single of the decade on the Christian adult contemporary charts. It stayed on the radio charts an astounding 14 months, while "For Annie" reached the top five on Christian radio in 24 markets.

As important as the success on radio was the band's ability to tour nationally – the costs of which had been formidable in previous years. Unable to raise enough money for nationwide tours in support of its previous albums, Petra received another break when the band Servant invited it to open on its 1981–82 tour. Under Hollingsworth's tutelage, the band refined its live performances, its members dressing in camouflage to emphasize the spiritual warfare theme recalled by Never Say Die's artwork, which featured an ocean war setting with an electric guitar doubling as an aircraft carrier. The tour turned Never Say Die into a commercial hit. In December 1981, it became the first Petra album to crack the Billboard Top 40 Inspirational LPs chart, debuting at No. 27, peaking at No. 7 in April 1982, and lasting on the chart through February 1983, more than 60 weeks after its debut.

==== More Power to Ya (1982) ====
Shortly after recording Never Say Die, Petra hired Louie Weaver, previously a drummer for early Christian rock acts Randy Matthews and Fireworks. The band's touring lineup was set, and Petra went on the road for 300 days in 1982, playing 162 shows, stopping only for the five weeks it took to record the follow-up album, More Power To Ya, that summer.

The album built on the themes introduced by its predecessor, from the artwork – again featuring electric guitars, this time doubling as Star Wars-style spaceships – to the music, which again featured a mix of hard-driving rockers and radio-friendly ballads. The formula was becoming clear: Two radio ballads (the title track and "Road to Zion" fitting the bill this time), one Volz-penned praise tune ("Praise Ye the Lord" on Never Say Die, "Let Everything That Hath Breath" for More Power to Ya), and six or seven straight-ahead progressive rock songs written by Hartman, touching on topics aimed mostly at young Christians.

Petra also used the record to defuse the backmasking controversy, which had begun to spread into Christian music, as conservative church leaders accused Christian artists of hiding subliminal messages that could only be heard when records were played in reverse. Inserting a blatant piece of backmasking in the break between the title track and hard rocker "Judas' Kiss", the band's message was less than subtle. Played in reverse, the backmasked portion stated: "What are you looking for the devil for when you oughta be looking for the Lord?" It was not the first – nor would it be the last – time Petra weighed in against critics of contemporary Christian music.

The title track became a smash radio hit, the fourth-hottest song of 1983 on Christian adult contemporary radio, and the album was hailed as Petra's best yet:

Ever since Washes Whiter Than, the "new" Petra has been working out the bugs of a polished pop-rock sound. With their latest release, More Power to Ya, say goodbye to bugs. Petra has crafted a style that could easily lock horns with anything on the industry charts and win.

The band also began receiving attention from the mainstream music industry, as Billboard dubbed More Power to Ya a "Top Album Pick" and praised the band's "surging music, tough lyrics and effective vocals." Helped by the positive press and Star Song's recent distribution deal with Word Records, the album quickly surpassed the sales of Never Say Die, jumping to sixth on the Billboard inspirational chart within three months and trailing only albums by pop and traditional Christian artists such as Amy Grant, Sandi Patti and the Imperials.

A year after its release, More Power to Ya remained one of the five best-selling albums in Christian music, while Never Say Die remained in the top 20 – more than two years after it hit the shelves. At the end of 1982, the two albums had sold nearly 100,000 units combined. By the next summer, More Power to Ya alone had topped 125,000, a total nearly unthinkable for a Christian rock album just 12 months earlier. More Power to Ya would not drop out of the Top 40 Christian albums until June 1985, more than two and one-half years after its debut.

==== Not of This World (1983) ====
Petra again hit the road for an intense tour with Servant, playing to an estimated 150,000 people in 1982, mostly in venues seating as few as 1,000 people. Petra played 152 shows in 1983, taking six weeks off that summer to record the follow up, Not of this World.

Stylistically, the album was similar to the band's previous two releases, filled with straight-ahead rockers and garnished with radio-friendly ballads, but for the first time, the band experimented with synthesizers; however, they did not shift completely away from the Hammond B3 organ, as it was featured in several tracks ("Not of This World", "Grave Robber", "Occupy" and "Lift Him Up"). Nevertheless, the result was something of a preview of the band's direction in future albums, as Petra would embrace the heavier guitar styles that such a sound better complemented. As if to emphasize the shift, the album opened and closed with Petra's first-ever instrumental tracks: synthesized versions of the Doxology.

As with the band's most recent albums, Not of This World was well received critically and commercially. By now widely recognized as the top Christian rock band in the genre's short history, the Petra formula was well in place. "Not of This World continues Petra's winning streak of great records that minister the Good News with good music," CCM Magazine wrote in praising the album. In addition, Not of This World garnered Petra its first Grammy nomination, for Best Performance By a Gospel Duo, Group, Choir or Chorus in 1985.

Continuing with the trend of producing radio hits, the title track became a major radio hit during 1983 and 1984, with "Grave Robber" being a minor radio hit during that same time. "Lift Him Up" was the featured praise song on this album. The album was massively successful in the still-new world of Christian rock: It became the No. 1 Christian album in the country in February 1984, dislodging Amy Grant's Age to Age, which had held the top spot for more than a year. More than six months after its release, Not of This World remained in the top five, behind two albums by Grant and one by Sandi Patty. More Power to Ya, in its 86th week on the chart, was still in the top 10.

To support Not of This World, Petra launched its biggest tour yet – 150 dates around the world with a total attendance of more than 450,000 people through the end of 1984. Headlining for the first time, Petra poured resources into creating a concert experience as dynamic as any secular rock band, using numerous lights, stage effects and costumes.

Hollingsworth, the band's manager, made Petra's mission clear:

The band is not in competition with other Christian bands. We feel we are competing with Journey, Styx and REO Speedwagon. We need to be aware of them, because the people who come to see Petra go to see those bands as well. We are being very naïve if we don't keep that in mind. We need to have a light system, sound system and presentation that will be competitive with those groups.

With 1984 drawing to a close, Not of This World was deemed Christian music's fourth-best-selling album of the year, while More Power to Ya, released nearly two years earlier, was No. 5. No other rock albums were in the top 12. Petra itself, meanwhile was listed second only to Amy Grant as Billboard's Top Inspirational Artist of 1984.

==== Beat the System (1985) ====
By any measure, Petra was at the height of its success as it toured for Not of This World and prepared to record a follow-up album. No Christian rock band had sold more records, played before bigger crowds or had enjoyed such pervasive radio airplay.

As Petra ended its tour and prepared to enter the studio, Slick left the band, and Petra again turned to Brown to produce what would ultimately be the last studio album of the Volz era. Looking for a more electronic sound and down a keyboardist, Brown turned to a programmer to create keyboard, bass and drum sounds electronically, effectively sidelining Kelly and Weaver during the recording process and continuing a practice begun the previous album in which Brown sought someone other than Weaver to drum for the band inside the studio. Toward the end of recording the album, John Lawry, who had played with the band during the Not of This World tour after fulfilling his obligations to the Joe English Band, joined officially as Petra's newest keyboardist.

Beat the System was released in 1985, and it featured a dramatic departure from Petra's previous style, emphasizing keyboards, electronic drums and computerized sound effects. The synth-heavy rock record was a monster hit.

Helped in part by a newly inked distribution agreement between Word and A&M that would give Petra and other Word-distributed bands placement in mainstream music stores for the first time, Beat the System sold more than 200,000 copies in four months, and by the end of the year, Billboard had certified Petra as the biggest-selling gospel music group in the country. When it debuted at No. 18 on the Billboard Top 40 Inspirational LPs chart in February 1985, Beat the System trailed both Not of This World (No. 6 in its 56th week on the chart) and More Power to Ya (No. 15 in week 115). Not for long: It leapt to No. 4 on the next chart, giving Petra two top 10 albums for the first time, and by June it had taken over the top spot on the chart, which it held for more than two months. In the end, Beat the System was one of the nation's top two Christian albums for nearly half a year.

For its career, Petra topped the million-record mark in 1985, with 900,000 of them sold in the four years since Never Say Die. At the time of its release, Beat the System was the biggest Christian rock record ever recorded and the third-biggest Christian album of the 1980s (trailing only Amy Grant's Age to Age and Sandi Patti's Songs From the Heart), even though it did not produce any radio hits. By decade's end, Beat the System's impact on the Christian sales charts trailed only records by Grant, Patti, Steve Green and Michael W. Smith. Finally, the band was nominated for a Grammy for the second consecutive year, again for Best Gospel Performance by a Duo, Group, Choir or Chorus.

==== Captured in Time and Space (1986) ====
Petra recorded a music video of Beat the System's title track, and then went on tour again, ultimately playing to more than 500,000 people in the yearlong world tour, which ranked second in all of Christian music only to Amy Grant's. To capture the energy of the tour, the band recorded performances in Tennessee and South Carolina over three nights in November 1985 and released the final product on vinyl and VHS shortly after, dubbing it Captured in Time and Space.

The album was a farewell to Petra's first era of popularity and the sound it had cultivated with Volz's distinctive vocals. As constant touring took its toll on the band, Hartman and Volz began to disagree about Petra's future, both on stage and off. The tour, while it drew more fans than ever, was expensive, and it left Petra hurting financially. Increased competition from other Christian rock bands, for whom Petra had paved the way, led to lower-than-expected showings as the tour went on. As Hartman told CCM Magazine in 1986, "If I had to put it in a nutshell without getting too deep, I would have to say it's business. Greg and I agree on just about everything except business."

In 1985 Volz announced he would leave the band to pursue a solo career upon completion of the tour and release of the live album, leaving in doubt the future of the world's biggest Christian rock band.

=== 1986–1994: Petra's peak ===
With Petra hurting financially and Volz announcing his departure, rumors swirled that Petra would break up.

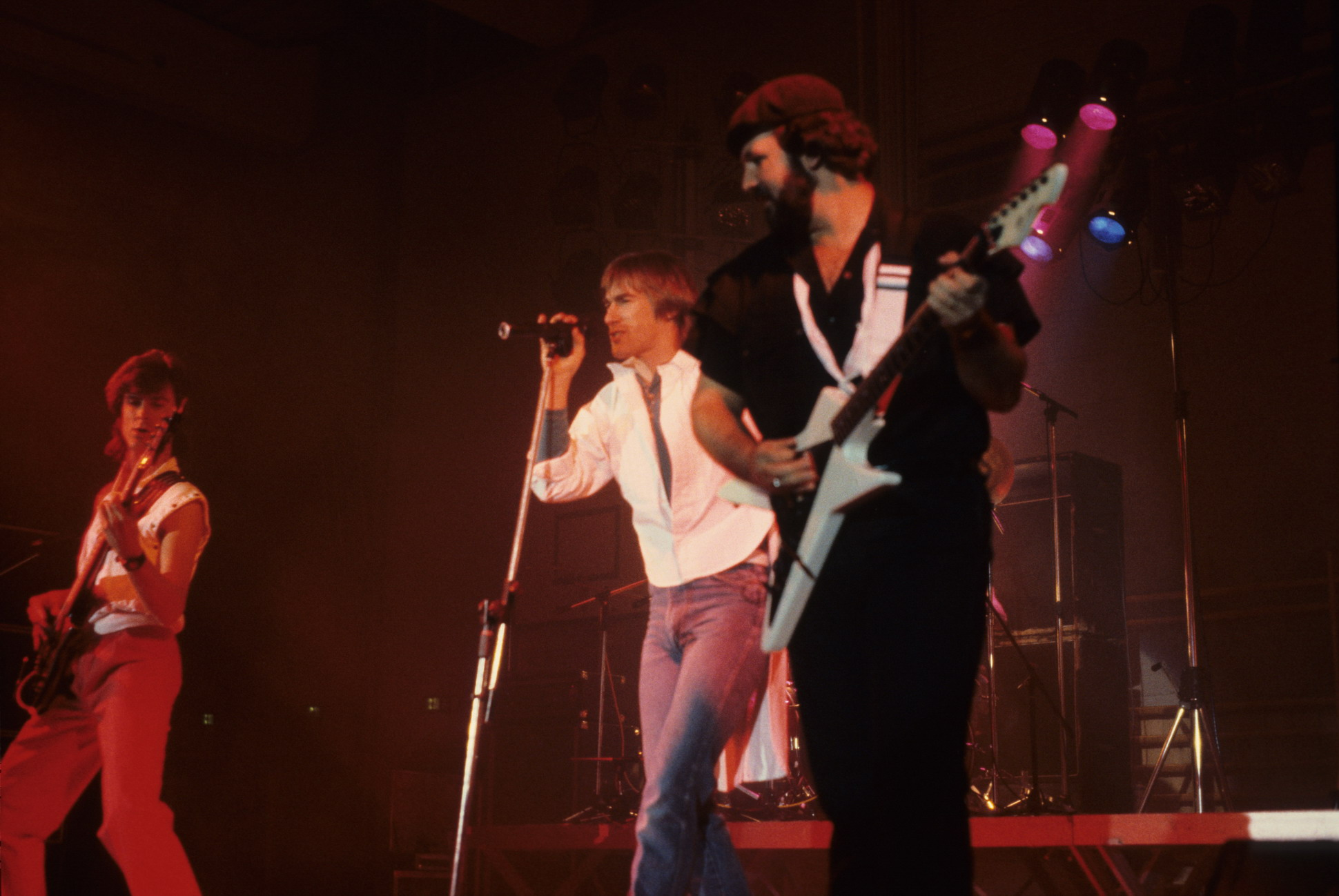
Kelly, Schlitt and Hartman playing in Norway (1986)

Instead, Hartman turned to former Head East vocalist John Schlitt, whom he had met on an airplane some years before but who had since converted to Christianity and left rock music altogether. Schlitt needed little convincing. He was introduced to Petra fans at a show in Australia in February 1986.

With Petra seeking a new musical direction to support the style of its new vocalist – and expressing unhappiness with the sound Brown produced for Captured in Time and Space – band and producer parted ways. To replace Brown, Star Song tapped the Elefante brothers – John, former keyboardist and lead vocalist for Kansas, and Dino, who had written songs for Kansas and had more recently produced albums for Christian metal bands such as Barren Cross. The combination of Schlitt and the Elefante Brothers significantly altered Petra's sound and set the stage for the band's greatest success. Louder Sound stated in 2023 that "the Schlitt-led Petra would rival most secular artists."

==== Back to the Street (1986) ====
After a brief introductory tour overseas with Schlitt singing the Volz classics, Petra entered the studio to record the first album with the band's new singer.

Petra's members said they found the Elefantes easier to work with, and for the first time since More Power to Ya, the entire band performed on the same record without studio fill-ins. Likewise, the Elefantes' hard rock roots led to re-emphasizing Hartman's guitars as the preeminent instrument in the band's sound. Looking to shatter the "Petra formula", the band intentionally avoided what Hartman called "a stock radio ballad." While acknowledging that the abrupt change in style likely cost the band some fans, Hartman hailed Back to the Street as "the truest representation of this band's talent."

The result was a transitional album that neither reflected where Petra had been, nor where the band would be for the next decade. As a result, sales lagged, though the one ballad on the album, "Thankful Heart", achieved radio success, ranking No. 9 on the annual airplay chart. The album received positive reviews though not quite gushing, as evidenced by CCM Magazine's half-hearted praise: "With Back to the Street, Petra rocks, and they do it pretty well." Nevertheless, the album was Petra's third straight studio offering to be nominated for a Grammy, and for the first time, the Gospel Music Association recognized Petra's success with three Dove Award nominations: artist of the year, band of the year and contemporary album of the year.

==== This Means War! (1987) ====
Finishing their Back to the Street tour in December 1986, Petra entered the studio the next month to begin writing and recording the band's follow-up. In the three weeks between, Hartman wrote seven songs – the foundation of what would become This Means War!, an album that musically saw the band continue to transition away from the keyboard-influenced, highly polished rock sound it had perfected earlier in the decade and toward an arena-rock sound heavy on guitars and emphasizing Schlitt's soaring vocals.

Lyrically, This Means War! took the implicit spiritual warfare theme that had been present in Petra's albums and tours since Never Say Die and emphasized it further. Although the album ended for good the band's longstanding tradition of featuring electric guitars as warcraft, its picture of a warrior on his knees complemented songs with titles such as "Get on Your Knees and Fight Like a Man", "All the King's Horses" and the title track, a rousing rocker backed by a marching drumbeat that addressed Satan as the preordained loser of the war he had declared against Christ and his followers. The message seemed in part a response to the attacks lobbed against the band by preachers and televangelists, especially Jimmy Swaggart, who denounced rock music in general – and Petra in particular – as tools of the devil. Billboard quoted Hartman saying how "Petra concerts aren't picketed like many Stryper concerts these days." It was not the first time Petra musically had addressed its Christian critics, doing so most explicitly in "Witch Hunt" on Beat the System, but the attacks clearly affected the band. "Not only does it deny the kids the opportunity and encouragement to go to the concert, but it hurts terribly our ministry," Hartman told CCM. "We experience a lot more skepticism. He says that there's all this decadence in Christian music, and that we're all in it for the money."

The result was "the most conceptual album Petra's ever done" and another hit. Within five weeks of its release, the album hit No. 1 on CCM Magazine's sales chart, where it joined the title track and "Don't Let Your Heart Be Hardened" at the top of their respective charts. This Means War's initial sales drew comparisons to Amy Grant's Age to Age as consumers snapped it off the shelves (though it ultimately fell short of that album's lofty marks). It also garnered the band its fourth consecutive Grammy nomination.

==== On Fire! (1988) ====
Mine Field
This track, third on the album, helped make On Fire! a hit. It reached No. 1 on the Christian rock radio charts and was part of what critics deemed "the crunchiest Petra sound yet."

As Petra's popularity built still further, the band expanded their reach by sponsoring children through Compassion International and advocating for a Constitutional amendment allowing prayer in public schools. Applying the spiritual warfare theme explored in This Means War!, Petra formed "Prayer Warrior" groups across the country – bands of youth groups to pray for each other. The focus on shepherding Christian youth through a spiritual battle zone continued on the band's next album, On Fire!

With a cover featuring a flaming sword breaking through a pane of glass, On Fire! was Petra's heaviest album yet, the culmination of the transition begun with Back to the Street. A fully hard rock album, bordering in places on heavy metal, On Fire! made the most of songs such as "All Fired Up", "Hit You Where You Live" and "Mine Field" – all of which continued the spiritual warfare theme. CCM Magazine, in praising the album, called On Fire! "the crunchiest Petra sound yet" and praised the first two tracks as "the most exciting eight minutes of rock Petra has ever put to tape." Once again, the band scored hits with its initial singles, as "First Love", the radio ballad, and "Mine Field", the rocker, hit No. 1 on three of Music Line Magazine's four Christian radio charts. "First Love" finished 1988 as the year's 10th-most-played radio single. With the album, Petra released a long-form film, tying a series of short-form music videos together with ministry segments. The film garnered the band its first Dove award, for Long Form Music Video of the Year in 1990, and its fifth consecutive Grammy nomination for its studio offerings.

The tour, meanwhile, reflected the band's increasing name recognition, with more than 100 shows and a stage set that included a 30-foot (9.1 m) steel and aluminum sword modeled after the On Fire! album cover. Touring with popular evangelist Josh McDowell Petra played to audiences of more than 8,000 each night.

On Fire! featured the first lineup change since Schlitt joined the band, as bassist Mark Kelly was replaced by Ronny Cates, ushering in the most stable lineup in Petra's history: Hartman on guitars, Schlitt on vocals, Lawry on keyboards, Weaver on drums and Cates on bass.

==== Petra Praise: The Rock Cries Out (1989) ====
Touring with the popular McDowell bought Petra credibility with youth leaders and church pastors, who were impressed by the speaker's forceful defense of Christian rock music. Seeking to build on that growing influence, Hartman and Schlitt turned to youth ministers directly at a conference in California, asking them how Petra could better aid their ministries. The response: Produce some music that could be better replicated in a church setting. "So we thought, 'What if we do a CD with worship songs that we think are cool, but do it Petra style and then provide an accompaniment track for the youth groups?'" Schlitt said.

The result was the first-ever contemporary praise-and-worship album in Christian music, with praise staples such as "Take Me In", "The Battle Belongs to the Lord" and "King of Kings" done in Petra's hard-rock style, together with two new rockers in the same lyrical vein. The band's new label, Word Records, billed it "a praise and worship record unlike any ever seen." Inside Music magazine agreed, calling Petra Praise "truly different." In one interview, Schlitt acknowledged the band was "going out on a limb."

The limb held, as Petra Praise: The Rock Cries Out became one of the band's best selling, certified Gold by the Recording Industry Association of America in 1998. After its release in October 1989, Petra Praise remained in the top 10 of Christian contemporary album sales for nearly a year. The artwork also won a Dove award, the band's second. In subsequent years, the album would be cited by such popular praise bands as Sonicflood as influencing their decision to enter the genre.

==== Beyond Belief (1990) ====
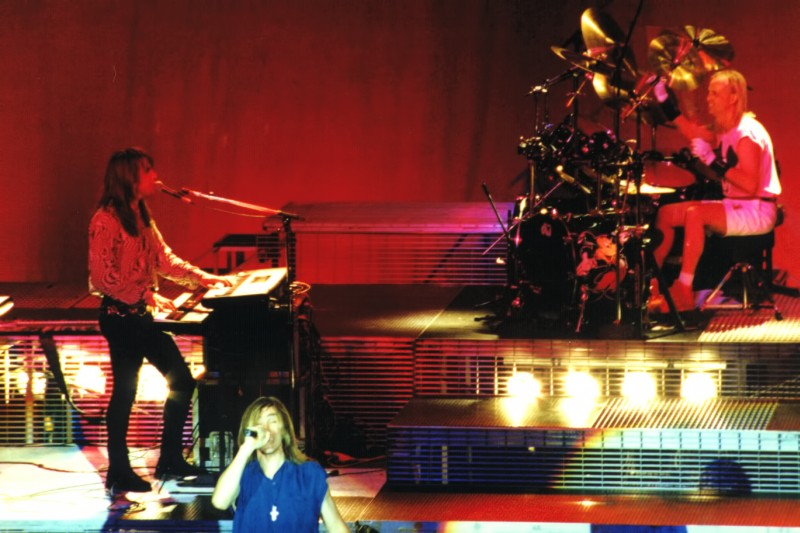
Petra, Beyond Belief Tour, Edmonton, Alberta

The success of Petra Praise opened the door for even greater success than Petra had seen previously. The Christian rock scene had exploded, and the critics of the past decade had largely been silenced. The band went back to the studio to record a hard-hitting album that would be accompanied by a concept movie, in which the characters interact with the band between six music videos.

Lyrically, the album focused on the concept of faith implied by the album's title, Beyond Belief, with radio singles entitled "Creed", "Love" and "Prayer", as well as the title track and "I Am on the Rock". Musically, the band embraced a hard rock sound reminiscent of Def Leppard, as described by CCM Magazine: "Petra has certainly moved more and more toward a big, arena rock sound in the past few years (the most obvious fruit of their association with the Elefantes), and Beyond Belief is, if not completely Kansas-inspired, certainly on par with some of the best arena rock music around." The band also, for the first time, drew from a handful of local non-accredited artists such as John Wayfield (percussion), Adam Lawson (keyboards) and Mark Strumford (guitar) during the album's recording.

Beyond Belief was huge, the band's most successful release ever, peaking at No. 1 on the Christian charts and certified Gold by the RIAA in 1995. The radio single "Love" shot to the top of the charts and stayed there, becoming Christian radio's biggest hit of 1991.

It won the band its first Grammy, in the newly created best Rock/Contemporary Gospel Album category, as well as Dove awards for Rock Album of the Year, Rock Recorded Song of the Year for the title track and Recorded Music Packaging of the Year. More historically, the Gospel Music Association for the first time honored a rock band as Group of the Year, as Petra beat contemporary artists 4HIM, First Call, Take 6 and BeBe & CeCe Winans.

The band was at the peak of its popularity, playing to sold-out arenas of 10,000 fans on yet another nationwide tour, and in CCM Magazine's year-end Reader's Choice Awards, the band swept to first place in eight categories, second place in four more, and garnered three times as many votes for pop/rock artist of the year as second-place finisher Michael W. Smith.

==== Unseen Power (1991) ====
At the height of its career, the members of Petra were wary of repeating the arena-rock formula that had served the band so well since the mid-1980s. Seeking a way to change directions musically, the band and its producers for their next album hired an outside engineer for the first time, bringing in Neil Kernon, who had previously worked with Kansas, Elton John and Peter Gabriel. Along with its usual hard rock fare, the band added tracks that featured a gospel choir and a bluesy sound, and Kernon's influence led to an album with a stronger emphasis on the band's rhythm section.

Hartman also shifted his songwriting style, moving away from his practice of constructing albums around loose themes and writing tracks more personal in nature. The result was Unseen Power, a Petra album that, for the first time, was distributed by a secular record company, Epic. That, and the immensely favorable reaction to its release, led to talk of Petra following in the wake of Grant and Smith as a potential crossover hit, popular in both Christian and secular circles. "If it happens, then yes, we're ready", Schlitt said of the possibility.

Though the secular breakthrough never came, the album was a hit, allowing Petra to top 6 million records sold since its inception – the most of any Christian artist at the time. The newly formed Hard Rock Cafe asked the band for materials to include in its restaurant displays, another first for a Christian band. And Petra became the only Christian band to play Farm Aid when it took the Texas Stadium stage before 40,000 people in 1992. Unseen Power opened No. 1 on Billboard's Christian music charts in November 1991 and stayed in the top 10 for seven months. Radio single "Hand on My Heart" was among the top 20 songs on Christian AC radio in 1992, and it was one of five tracks from the album to hit No. 1 on the Christian radio charts.

Unseen Power garnered the band its second Grammy, again winning for Best Rock/Contemporary Gospel Album, and a Dove award, for Rock Recorded Song of the Year.

==== Wake Up Call (1993) ====
Taking what for its members was an unusual yearlong break between touring and recording the band's followup to Unseen Power, Petra emerged to a changing musical landscape requiring adjustment from the 20-year-old band. "I think we're on the verge of a new era for Petra", Hartman said shortly after the release of 1993's Wake-Up Call. "I'm not sure what that will be – but it won't be disco."

As the broader musical climate soured on the arena-rock style that had been Petra's musical core, the band continued to revamp its style, breaking with the Elefante brothers for the first time in six records. Instead, Brown Bannister, who at the time had won eight Grammy awards as a producer and songwriter, mostly for Amy Grant, was brought in. The reason for the change was purely practical: the band, now consisting largely of middle-aged fathers living in Nashville, did not want to travel to California, where the Elefantes were based, to record an album. Also seeking a new musical direction, the band sought out Bannister after enjoying his work for White Heart earlier in the decade.

Wake Up Call as a result was the band's first significant shift from the style of the 1980s, featuring fewer driving rock tracks and favoring instead midtempo songs and ballads. Bannister's production style, favoring authenticity over the Elefantes' slick production styles, led to a rawer feel for the album. Hartman called it "probably the most indicative of who Petra really is."

The change was well received, as the album stayed on Billboard's Christian albums chart for more than five months and was the third consecutive Petra album to receive a Grammy for Best Rock Gospel Album. The short-lived America's Christian Music Awards named Petra favorite rock group or duo and named Wake Up Call favorite rock CD, and the band won a Dove award for Rock Album of the Year. In the 1994 CCM Readers Awards, the band continued to clean up, winning Favorite Rock Artist/Band, Favorite Rock Album for Wake Up Call and Favorite Song for the radio hit "Just Reach Out".

More change was in the offing, however. As the band concluded its world tour for Wake Up Call in 1994 and began looking to re-enter the studio, Hartman, the lone remaining founding member, decided to retire from touring.

During the European leg of the tour, Petra was supported in May 1994 by the Swedish Christian rock band Jerusalem for shows in Birmingham, England; Zoetermeer, Netherlands; Fulda, Germany; and Oslo, Norway.

=== 1995–2002: The post-Hartman era ===
Once again, rumors swirled about the band's imminent demise. Lawry, who had been Petra's keyboardist for more than a decade, left the band, and Hartman, citing a desire to be closer to his family and focus on songwriting, retired from touring. Meanwhile, Schlitt had just released a solo album. The band rejected the rumors, however; Hartman said he would continue writing and doing studio work with the band, and he turned over nearly all of Petra's administrative duties to Schlitt.

Schlitt brought in Jim Cooper to replace Lawry and David Lichens to replace Hartman on tour. Weaver was now the only band member with a connection to the Volz era of Petra – and he was hired when Petra was 10 years old. It was the first wholesale lineup change since 1980, but it was far from the last.

==== No Doubt (1995) ====
The new lineup set to recording No Doubt, a concerted effort to reach a younger audience no longer interested in the driving hard rock that had made the band the biggest in Christian music. Back to using producers John and Dino Elefante, Schlitt called the album "the best record we've ever done." The critics disagreed, citing in particular the electronic, scaled-back nature of the drums, which sapped the life out of the disc's rockers, and the prevalence of "fair to middlin'" tracks that failed to "break any new ground."

The album opened at No. 2 on Billboard's Top Christian Albums chart but fell out of the Top 10 two months later. It peaked at No. 91 on the Billboard Top 200, lasting eight weeks, and Schlitt acknowledged sales had dropped from the band's previous chart-toppers. Its key radio single, the title track, barely cracked the 40 most-played songs for 1995. For the first time since the creation of the Rock Gospel Album category in the Grammies, Petra was nominated but failed to win, though it did pick up a Dove award for Rock Album of the Year, and CCM Magazine's annual Reader Awards placed Petra once again at the top as the fans' favorite rock band, with No Doubt their favorite rock album.

The lackluster sales and tepid reviews, combined with the lineup changes, painted a picture of a band in decline. The quick departure of Cooper and Lichens, joined by longtime bassist Cates, did not help. Schlitt said Cates cited fatigue with the touring lifestyle, but that he fired Lichens and Cooper over differences about the band's musical direction and unhappiness with the possibility of recording a second praise album. Lonnie Chapin replaced Cates on bass, while two members of Schlitt's solo band, Kevin Brandow (guitar and keyboards) and Pete Orta (guitars), filled the remaining slots.

==== Petra Praise 2: We Need Jesus (1997) ====
Despite the turmoil, Petra prepared in 1997 to release its 16th studio album, a sequel to its wildly successful Petra Praise album eight years earlier. The band had noticeably slipped from the heights it had occupied early in the decade. "Things kind of tapered off for a while," Hartman said of the post-Wake Up Call Petra. "I think there's a really good chance Petra could be back on the upswing."

Petra Praise 2: We Need Jesus featured few truly hard rock songs, as evidenced when it was nominated for a Grammy in the Best Pop/Contemporary Gospel Album category. Instead, it placed heavy emphasis on acoustic guitars, mandolins, keyboards and other, more experimental styles. The title track, the album's big radio single, featured guest vocals from Foreigner's Lou Gramm, and though Petra Praise 2 reached No. 1 on the Christian albums chart, overall sales flagged, as the album barely reached the Billboard 200, peaking at No. 155. One secular critic dismissed the disc as "religious muzak" and labeled Petra "the Barry Manilow of Christian rock". We Need Jesus eventually won a Dove award for Praise and Worship Album.

The failure of the album to rejuvenate the band's career seemed apparent by September 1997, when Schlitt was asked about the band's success:

I would say from my gut that we are probably as low as we're going to go in that valley, and heading for the next peak. That's fine with me because everybody needs a turn. We've been at the top of the mountain twice already, and, if nothing else, we need to get out of the way and let other bands have some fun. I mean, now there's variety that Christian kids can have. And they don't just grab Petra. Now they can grab Jars of Clay, dc Talk or Newsboys.

==== God Fixation (1998) ====
With Orta, Chapin and Brandow established in the band, they joined with Schlitt and Weaver to produce the incarnation's first full-fledged Petra album, God Fixation. The three new members were given broad rein to influence the music as they wrote songs with Hartman, leading to a drastic change toward a mellower rock sound.

Though the album was praised by critics as "fresher and more immediate than [Petra] has been in a long time," hailed for "strong" music and songwriting and nominated for a Grammy, fans clearly rejected the album's alt-rock, mid-tempo feel. The album failed to reach any higher than 10th on the Billboard Christian albums chart and missed the Billboard 200 altogether.

Faced with criticism that the band had strayed too far from its hard-rock roots and did not "sound like Petra anymore", Schlitt responded: "Petra wasn't selling worth a stink. Petra was going down the drain, and I don't want to go down the drain yet."

==== Double Take (2000) ====
The band's contract with Word Records was stumbling to an end. To complete the six-disc deal, the band re-recorded a set of its biggest hits in an acoustic format, including two new songs. The album, Double Take, was all but ignored by both Word and the Christian music industry and met with antipathy by the band's fans, who rejected the reimagining of some of Petra's most loved songs. Though it garnered some positive reviews – HM Magazine for one said "these stripped-down rockers sound pretty good" – the album was largely rejected by critics and fans alike, and it sold fewer than 40,000 copies. When Double Take won Petra its fourth Grammy, for Best Rock Gospel Album in 2001, critics charged it was an example of the Grammy voters being "out to lunch."

After six albums that spanned Petra's highest peak and ended with the band in its lowest valley to date, the band and its label parted ways. "Their interests were starting to go in other directions, so it was time for us to leave and find a label that's interested in rebuilding the fact that we still exist," Schlitt said.

With the band's future again uncertain, Petra received the highest of accolades from the Gospel Music Association as the first rock band to be inducted into the Gospel Music Hall of Fame. Soon after, however, as Petra continued to search for a new label home, the band experienced another massive upheaval when newest member, Trent Thomason (keyboards and vocals), left the band due to a lack of live dates. Soon after, Chapin and Orta left the band as well. Once again, only Schlitt and Weaver were left as the faces of Petra.

==== Revival (2001) ====
After a lengthy label search, Petra was signed by Inpop Records, then just two years old and founded by Newsboys lead singer Peter Furler, an admirer of the band. Inpop assigned former Sonicflood members Dwayne Larring and Jason Halbert to produce a third praise-and-worship album, to be called Revival – a none-too-subtle reference to the label's hopes for Petra's career. Additionally, the label focused its packaging solely on the band's three most famous members, convincing Hartman, who still was not touring but had never stopped writing and playing guitar in the studio, to join Schlitt and Weaver as the label-marketed version of Petra. Studio musicians, including bassist Rick Cua, filled in the rest.

The result was a well-received album, helped in part by an Inpop gimmick that comprised sending radio executives and media representatives an unlabeled CD of the album and asking them to guess – many doing so futilely – what band had recorded it. CCM Magazine described the album as a "cage match pitting Aerosmith against Third Day," and several reviewers praised the band's modern-rock rendition of the classic hymn "Amazing Grace". Nevertheless, the band struggled to gain airplay for its singles, and the album failed to crack even the Billboard Christian albums chart.

Petra hired three new members for the subsequent tour: Bryce Bell on keyboards, Quinton Gibson on guitars and Greg Bailey on bass. His inclusion on the album artwork notwithstanding, Hartman maintained his retirement from touring, although he returned for the recording of this album.

=== 2003–2006: Bob Hartman's return and farewell ===
As it entered the studio for its 20th album, Petra continued to find stability elusive, as Bell and Gibson left to pursue other endeavors. Then, in a shocking announcement, the band announced drummer Louie Weaver, the longest-tenured member of Petra other than Hartman himself, had "come to an impasse" with the rest of the band and "will not be forming with us any longer." Weaver, in his own statement, said that the band had fired him, and that he was "shocked" and "surprised" by the decision. Hartman later said the decision had been made by Schlitt, in consultation with his pastor and Hartman; neither side gave a reason for the dismissal.

==== Jekyll and Hyde (2003) ====
For the band's 20th studio album, Jekyll and Hyde, Furler handled production duties himself. With Weaver's departure, Furler played drums, while Gibson's departure meant Hartman would be Petra's full-time guitarist for the first time since 1994. Wade Jaynes, a studio bassist, also was tapped to perform in place of Bailey, at Furler's request. Furler, in particular, pushed Hartman to write heavier, riff-based songs along the lines of the title track, which Hartman had written before the decision to record Revival instead of a traditional album with original material.

The result was an exceptionally heavy album filled with crunchy riffs, modernized by removing the trademark keyboards and guitar solos from Petra's sound. In an Inpop-produced statement, Schlitt called the album "our most aggressive rock record so far." Critics and fans alike greeted the album with acclamation, hailing it as the band's "best album in years" and "one of this year's biggest musical surprises," "a powerful rock effort ... bordering on metal." For the first time since Petra Praise 2, six years earlier, the band broke onto the Billboard charts, peaking at No. 22 on the Christian albums chart. The album also garnered Petra its 13th Grammy nomination.

With no keyboardist necessary on tour, a first for the band since its earliest days, and Hartman returning to the stage, the band needed only to replace Weaver, hiring Paul Simmons shortly after the album's release. Petra then prepared a worldwide tour beginning in 2004, including a June show in Indiana that featured a reunion of original members Hartman, Hough and DeGroff in the middle of the contemporary band's set. Simmons filled in for original drummer Glover, who was invited but could not attend. Shows in India near the end of the year featured crowds as large as 20,000.

==== Farewell (2005) ====
Despite rumors that Petra was working on another studio album, John Schlitt announced in May 2005 that he and Hartman had agreed to disband Petra at the end of the year, following a short farewell tour.

As a final sendoff, Petra recorded its show in Franklin, Tennessee, on October 4, which included special appearances by Volz and Lawry, each performing on a handful of songs from his tenure with the band. The performance was released on CD in November and DVD in March 2006, each titled simply Farewell. Petra's last performance began December 31, 2005, in Murphy, North Carolina, and ended shortly after midnight, January 1, 2006, nearly 34 years after Hartman founded the band.

=== 2007–present: Reunions and 40th Anniversary ===
==== Vertical Expressions (2007) ====
Schlitt and Hartman, after arranging worship music together for a youth retreat, reunited for an independently released praise-and-worship CD in 2007, calling themselves II Guys from Petra and titling their album Vertical Expressions. The songs featured contemporary praise songs in a raw-sounding, electric rock format, and included two bonus tracks from Petra's recorded farewell performance that had not been included on the Farewell CD. Studio musicians played drums and bass, and former Petra keyboardist Jim Cooper teamed with Hartman on production. Hartman and Schlitt have since performed several shows together, playing acoustic renditions of Petra and II Guys songs as recently as early 2010.

==== Reunion shows ====
The full band as comprised on the Farewell tour first reunited at the end of 2007, playing a 90-minute set in Buenos Aires as part of Rock & Vida, a festival to commemorate World AIDS Day. The lineup consisted of Hartman, Schlitt, Simmons and Bailey. This version of Petra, though in some cases with Simmons replaced by Christian Borneo on drums, reunited four more times in 2010, appearing at Heaven Fest in Longmont, Colorado, and Hills Alive Festival in Rapid City, South Dakota, as well as performing a pair of shows in Brazil. The band performed again at Rock & Vida in December 2010.

==== Classic Petra and Back to the Rock (2010–2011) ====
In early 2010, Hartman and former Petra members agreed to reunite to record an album in the fall, with a subsequent world tour. The lineup featured Hartman on guitars, Greg X. Volz on vocals, Mark Kelly on bass, Louie Weaver on drums and John Lawry on keyboards. Although that specific lineup recorded only one studio album together – Beat the System in 1985 – Hartman, Volz, Kelly and Weaver were the heart of Petra's initial wave of success, recording More Power to Ya, Not of This World and Beat the System together before Volz's departure in 1986. Additionally, Weaver toured with the band in support of Never Say Die, Petra's first significant tour. Lawry, meanwhile, was Petra's longest-tenured keyboardist, joining the band on the Not of This World tour in 1984 and leaving 10 years later, at the end of Petra's second wave of success. Along with recording Beat the System, this iteration of Petra also was filmed for Captured in Time and Space, the first of the band's two live albums.

The album, Back to the Rock, was released for digital download in November 2010, with hard copies also sold at the band's November concert taping. It featured re-recordings of 10 classic Petra songs from the early and mid-1980s, as well as two new tracks. Hard copies of the CD went on sale in January 2011. That same month, the members of Classic Petra played a live show together for the first time in decades, taping the concert at the TBN studios, with a documentary preceding the concert. Though recorded ostensibly for broadcast on TBN and eventual DVD release, the show first found life as a live album, released digitally to iTunes and Amazon in April 2011. A companion DVD was released that July. In July 2011, Classic Petra again performed at Cornerstone Festival, closing the day of classic Christian rock.

==== 40th Anniversary Tour ====
In July 2013, StarSong released a 40th Anniversary compilation album featuring more than 30 songs covering most of the band's trajectory. After that, the band reunited again with Schlitt, Hartman, Bailey, and Borneo, to tour in celebration of the band's 40th anniversary. The band also recorded a new song titled "Holy is Your Name", and performed in several venues during the fall of 2013. During that time, it was also announced that the band was invited to play at the Classic Rock Tour 2014 slated for February 2014. The show was supposed to feature classic rock acts like Asia featuring John Payne, Phil Bates from ELO Part II, and former Genesis frontman Ray Wilson.

On March 5, 2014, Petra was recognized by SESAC with the Legacy Award. The award was presented during a ceremony held at Hillwood Country Club in Nashville, Tennessee, attended by band founder Bob Hartman, and members Schlitt, Bailey, Borneo, and keyboardist John Lawry. Petra also performed live at the event.

==== Classic Petra Resurrection and Back to the Rock II (2017–present) ====
On December 4, 2017, a parallel project titled Back to the Rock II was released, bringing re-recordings from other 1980s hits and giving continuity to the previous Back to the Rock. This time, the line-up does not take the name of Classic Petra, but the name of CPR Band instead (later renamed as Classic Petra Resurrection, because of its acronym). The members of this formation are Greg X. Volz on lead vocals, Kirk Henderson on guitar (who would be replaced later in 2022 by Paul Carson), John Lawry on keyboards, and Ronny Cates on bass (who would be replaced later in 2018 by Greg Bailey) and Louie Weaver, on drums.

==== Hope (2026) ====
In December 2025, it was announced that Petra would be releasing their first album in over twenty years, titled Hope. The album was released on January 5, 2026. "Deliver Us", the album's lead single, peaked at No. 1 on the CR.net Christian Rock chart week dated to January 11, 2026. "Filthy Lucre" peaked at number 22 on the chart. Reviews of the record have been quite positive, with the Front Row Report giving it a 9/10 and Jesus Freak Hideout giving it 4 stars of 5

== Influence ==
=== Larry Norman ===
Hartman, already a rock musician when he became a Christian, struggled at the time with whether Christians could glorify God through rock music. He credited the work of musician Larry Norman as inspiring him to continue in Christian rock: "I'll never forget the first time I heard him. ... The freedom Larry had on stage, that freedom to just be himself, really set me free in my songwriting; it really set me free in the establishment of Petra."

=== On others ===
During its 33-year career, Petra influenced countless artists in and out of the Christian scene. Petra was the only Christian band to play at the 1992 Farm Aid concert and the first Christian band to be included in the Hard Rock Cafe. In 2000, Petra was the first Christian rock band to be inducted to the Gospel Music Hall of Fame. "The doubts about popular music mixing with Christian lyrics have mostly vanished due to their 25-year track record of proven ministry and changed lives. Petra was a true pioneer for our industry," GMA President Frank Breeden said at the time.

In 2004, CCM readers inducted Petra into its Hall of Fame, with the magazine noting:

Few artists had as much influence in the formation and growth of what has come to be known as "contemporary Christian music" as did Petra. ...As one of the movement's trailblazers, Petra bore the brunt of the controversy, enduring picketers, protesters and public denunciations by prominent Christian leaders. (It is, perhaps, a telling sign of the Christian community's former resistance to Petra that the band won a Grammy before they ever won a Dove Award!) Still, all rabble-rousers aside, Petra managed to create some of Christian music's most treasured recordings.

Several prominent Christian artists have listed Petra as an early influence:

- Bart Millard, lead singer of MercyMe, said More Power to Ya was the first album he had bought with his own money. "I bought it twice because I literally wore the first one out," he wrote in CCM. "Because of that record, I became consumed with Christian music."
- Singer/songwriter Chris Tomlin has listed Not of This World as his "first Christian album".
- The lead singer of rock band Third Day, Mac Powell, said the band formed with the intention of being "the next Petra. You know, we wanted to be the next big band that affected a lot of people through music."
- Former Newsboys lead singer Peter Furler – who founded Inpop Records, used the label to give Petra a home at the end of its career and produced the band's final studio album – and his band opened for Petra early in its career, and guitarist Jody Davis listed his first Petra concert as a major influence on his decision to move into live Christian music.

==== Tributes ====
Many artists have recorded tributes to Petra, including Christian-industry stars MxPx, Jars of Clay, Kevin Max of dc Talk, Sixpence None the Richer, Plankeye, Grammatrain and Galactic Cowboys, all of whom appeared on the tribute album Never Say Dinosaur, released in 1996 by Star Song. Country singer Tim McGraw has covered "More Power To Ya" in his concerts, including during his portion of a national telethon to raise money for victims of Hurricane Katrina in 2005.

Other artists have included single song covers of Petra in some of their albums. These include:

- "Thankful Heart" by Nathan Digesare (Jubilaté!, 1989)
- "Judas' Kiss" by One Bad Pig (Swine Flew, 1990)
- "More Power to Ya" by The RapSures (Loud, Proud and Born Again, 1990)
- "All Over Me" by Die Happy (Intense Records Presents Die Happy Recorded Live – Intense Live Series Vol. 4, 1993)
- "Adonai" by Hokus Pick (The B-Sides, 1996)
- "Let Everything That Hath Breath" by The Itzels (Up, 2011)
- "It Is Finished" by The Itzels (The New Life, 2013)
- "Jekyll and Hyde" by The Itzels (The New Life, 2013)

== Group history ==
Years	Band members	Albums	Video releases	Music videos
1972–1978	Bob Hartman – Guitar, banjo, vocals; Greg Hough – Guitar, mandolin, vocals; John DeGroff – Bass, guitar; Bill Glover – Drums, percussion, bass	Petra (1974); Come and Join Us (1977)
1978-1979 (concerts)	Bob Hartman – Lead guitar; Rob Frazier – Guitar, keyboards, vocals; Mike Martin – Drums, vocals; Tommy Bolles – Bass
1979	Bob Hartman – Lead guitar; Greg X. Volz – Lead vocals, drums; Rob Frazier – Guitar, keyboards, vocals	Washes Whiter Than (1979)
1979-1980 (concerts)	Bob Hartman – Guitar; Greg X. Volz – Lead vocals, bass; Steve Schneider – Keyboards; Jym Dingler – Drums
1981	Bob Hartman – Guitar, vocal; Greg X. Volz – Lead vocals; John Slick – Keyboards, backing vocal; Mark Kelly – Bass, backing vocal	Never Say Die (1981)
1981–1983	Bob Hartman – Lead and acoustic guitars, vocal; Greg X. Volz – Lead vocals, rhythm guitar, percussion; John Slick – Keyboards, backing vocal; Mark Kelly – Bass, vocal; Louie Weaver – Drums	More Power to Ya (1982); Not of this World (1983)		Blinded Eyes (1984)
1984–1986	Bob Hartman – Lead and acoustic guitars, guitar synthesizer; Greg X. Volz – Lead vocals, rhythm guitar, percussion; Mark Kelly – Bass, keyboard bass, backing vocal; Louie Weaver – Drums; John Lawry – Keyboards, keytar, backing vocal	Beat the System (1985); Captured in Time and Space (1986)		Beat the System (1984)
1986–1988	Bob Hartman – Guitar; Mark Kelly – Bass, backing vocal; Louie Weaver – Drums; John Lawry – Keyboards, keytar, backing vocal; John Schlitt – Lead vocals	Back to the Street (1986); This Means War! (1987)		Whole World (1986)
1988–1994	Bob Hartman – Guitar; Louie Weaver – Drums, backing vocal; John Lawry – Keyboards, keytar, backing vocal; John Schlitt – Lead vocals; Ronny Cates – Bass, keyboard bass, backing vocal	On Fire! (1988); Petra Praise: The Rock Cries Out (1989); Beyond Belief (1990); Unseen Power (1991); Petra en Alabanza (1992); Wake-Up Call (1993)	On Fire Video Event (1989); Beyond Belief Video Album (1990); Back Stage Pass (1992); Wake Up Call Video Collection (1993)	Defector (1989); Mine Field (1989); First Love (1989); Counsel of The Holy (1989); Who Do You Listen To? (1989); Creed (1990); Love (1990); Seen and Not Heard (1990); Beyond Belief (1990); I am on The Rock (1990); Armed and Dangerous (1990); Prayer (1990); Our Turn Now (with Carman, 1991); Destiny (1992); Who's on the Lord's Side (1992); Dance (1992); Sight Unseen (1992); I Need to Hear from You (1992); In the Likeness of You (1992); Midnight Oil (1993); Just Reach Out (1993)
1994–1995 (Wake Up Call Tour)	Bob Hartman – Guitar; Louie Weaver – Drums; John Schlitt – Lead vocals; Ronny Cates – Bass, backing vocal; Jim Cooper – Keyboards
1995–1996	Louie Weaver – Drums; John Schlitt – Lead vocals; Ronny Cates – Bass, backing vocal; Jim Cooper – Keyboards; David Lichens – Guitars (enlisted to travel with the band for live performances); Bob Hartman – Guitars (played all the guitars in the album)	No Doubt (1995)		Enter In (1995); Think Twice (1995)
1996–1999	Louie Weaver – Drums; John Schlitt – Lead vocals; Kevin Brandow – Keyboards, guitar; Lonnie Chapin – Bass; Pete Orta – Guitar, vocal	Petra Praise 2: We Need Jesus (1997); God Fixation (1998)
1999–2001	Louie Weaver – Drums; John Schlitt – Lead vocals; Lonnie Chapin – Bass; Pete Orta – Guitar, vocal; Trent Thomason – Keyboards	Double Take (2000)
2001–2003	Louie Weaver – Drums; John Schlitt – Lead vocals; Bryce Bell – Keyboards; Greg Bailey – Bass; Bob Hartman – Guitar (Studio); Quinton Gibson – Guitar (Tour)	Revival (2001); Still Means War! (2002)
2003–2006	Bob Hartman – Guitar (Studio, Tour); Quinton Gibson – Guitar (Tour 2003); John Schlitt – Lead vocals; Greg Bailey – Bass, cello, backing vocal; Paul Simmons – Drums	Jekyll and Hyde (2003); Jekyll & Hyde en Español (2004); Petra Farewell (2005)	Farewell (DVD) (2005)
2006–2010 (festivals and select concerts)	Bob Hartman – Guitar; John Schlitt – Lead vocals; Greg Bailey – Bass, cello, backing vocal
2010–2012 (Classic Petra)	Bob Hartman – Guitar; Greg X. Volz – Lead vocals; Mark Kelly – Bass, backing vocal; Louie Weaver – Drums; John Lawry – Keyboards, backing vocal	Back to the Rock (2010); Back to the Rock Live (2011)	Classic Petra Live (2011)
2013–2014 (40th Anniversary Reunion Tour)	John Schlitt – Vocals; Bob Hartman – Guitar, backing vocal; Greg Bailey – Bass, cello, backing vocal; Cristian Borneo – Drums	"Holy is Your Name" (single) (2013)
2014– (50th Anniversary tour, Upcoming Hope tour)	John Schlitt – Vocals; Bob Hartman – Guitar, backing vocal; Greg Bailey – Bass, cello, backing vocal; Cristian Borneo – Drums; John Lawry – Keyboards, keytar, backing vocal	Hope (2026)		"Deliver Us" (Lyric Video) (2026)

After founder Bob Hartman (26 years), the band members with the longest tenures are drummer Louie Weaver (22 years) and singer John Schlitt (20 years).

== Discography ==
See the main article for detailed information on all of Petra's albums and videos, including compilation albums, as well as a list of Petra songs available on other artists' albums and other compilation albums.

== Awards ==
- Inducted into the Christian Music Hall of Fame (2007)
- Inducted into the Gospel Music Hall of Fame (2000)
- Inducted into the Hard Rock Cafe (1994)

=== Grammy nominations ===
- Best Performance by a Gospel Duo, Group, Choir or Chorus – Not of This World (1985)
- Best Performance by a Gospel Duo, Group, Choir or Chorus – Beat the System (1986)
- Best Performance by a Gospel Duo, Group, Choir or Chorus – Back to the Street (1987)
- Best Performance by a Gospel Duo, Group, Choir or Chorus – This Means War! (1988)
- Best Performance by a Gospel Duo, Group, Choir or Chorus – On Fire! (1989)
- Best Rock Gospel Album – No Doubt (1996)
- Best Pop/Contemporary Gospel Album – Petra Praise 2: We Need Jesus (1998)
- Best Rock Gospel Album – God Fixation (1999)
- Best Rock Gospel Album – Jekyll & Hyde (2004)

=== Grammy Awards ===
- Best Rock/Contemporary Gospel Album – Beyond Belief (1990)
- Best Rock/Contemporary Gospel Album – Unseen Power (1992)
- Best Rock Gospel Album – Wake-Up Call (1994)
- Best Rock Gospel Album – Double Take (2000)

=== Dove Awards ===
- Long Form Music Video – "On Fire!" (1990)
- Recorded Music Packaging – Petra Praise: The Rock Cries Out (1990)
- Group of the Year (1991)
- Rock Album – Beyond Belief (1991)
- Rock Recorded Song – "Beyond Belief" (1991)
- Recorded Music Packaging – Beyond Belief (1991)
- Rock Recorded Song – "Destiny" (1993)
- Rock Album – Wake-Up Call (1994)
- Rock Album – No Doubt (1996)
- Praise and Worship Album – Petra Praise 2: We Need Jesus (1998)

=== Other awards ===
- The Netherlands' Contemporary Christian album of the year – This Means War! (1988)
