= Bob Hartman =

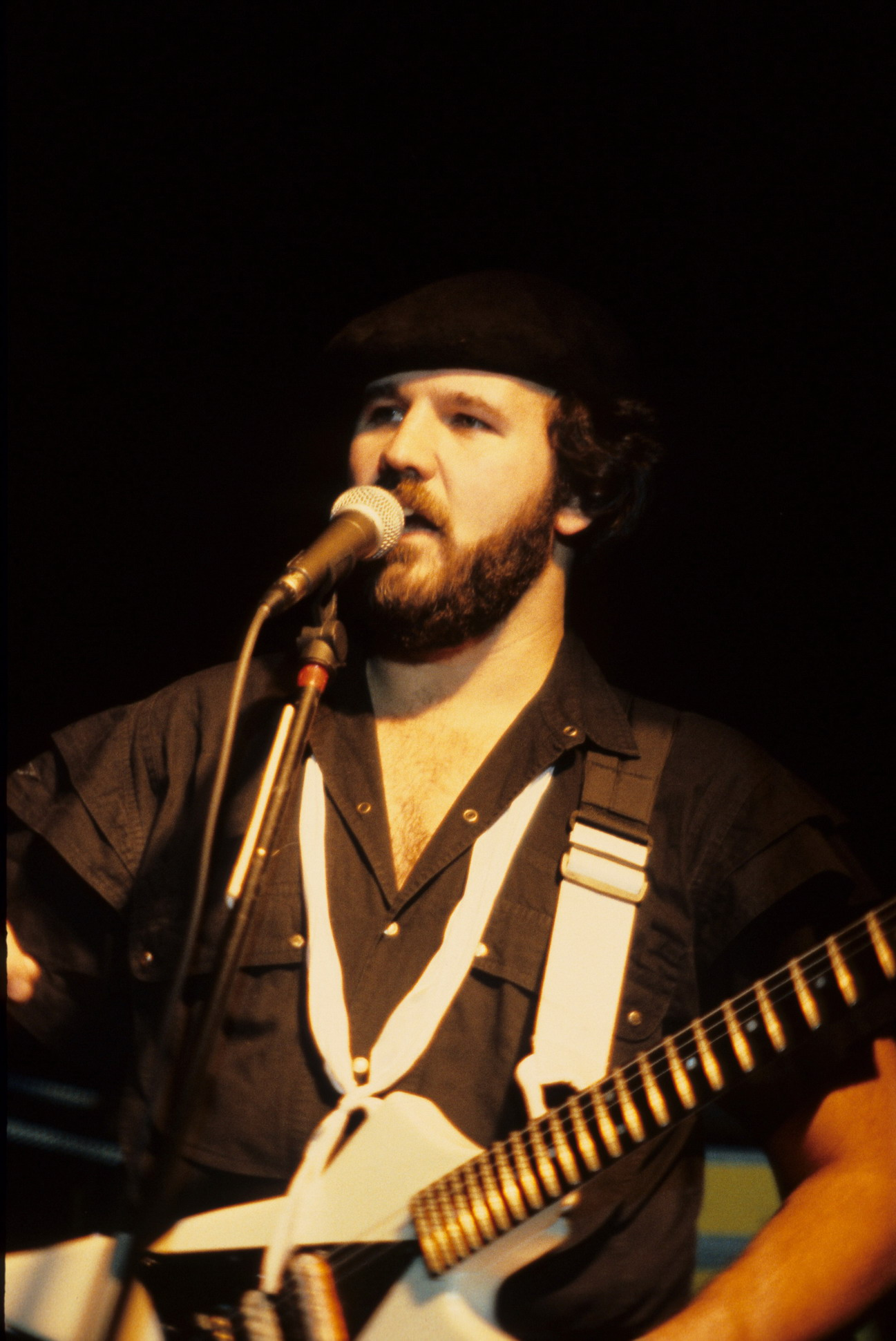
- Hartman in 1986

Background information
- Born: Robert Hartman; December 26, 1949 (age 76)
- Origin: Lyons, New York, U.S.
- Genres: Contemporary Christian music, rock
- Occupations: musician, songwriter, producer
- Instruments: Guitar, banjo, vocals
- Years active: 1972–present
- Website: www.houseofbob.com

Robert "Bob" Hartman (born December 26, 1949) is a Christian artist, guitarist, writer and songwriter. He is the founder of Christian rock band Petra. Hartman was involved with the band from its foundation in 1972 to its end in 2005. (Petra is currently on tour in 2025 as part of their "50th Reunion Tour," with upcoming shows in Jacksonville, Pensacola, and other cities. While the band formally disbanded, it has since reformed for reunion tours, the most recent being the 2025 tour.) He took a break from touring in 1995, but continued to write most of the band's songs, record guitars and produce most of the albums. He officially returned to touring with Petra in 2003 until he decided to retire the band in late 2005. Hartman also toured with Petra in 2023 for the band's 50th Anniversary Tour.

== Career ==
Bob Hartman grew up in Bryan, Ohio learned to play guitar when he was 13 years old, teaching himself from books and watching other people. He has said that two of his major influences was Joe Walsh, a member of The James Gang and Jimi Hendrix at the time.

Hartman converted to Christianity when he was 20 after having heard about the shootings at Kent State University and asking God if he was real to reveal Himself to Hartman. When he was 21, he joined a Christian band called Rapture with John DeGroff. During this time, he wrote some of the songs of the first Petra album. He also studied at Bowling Green State University, earning a B.A. in Psychology.

When Rapture broke up, DeGroff moved to Fort Wayne, Indiana to attend Christian Training Center (a school based in a church there). Hartman was already jamming with guitarist Greg Hough and they both moved to Indiana to attend the same school. Upon meeting drummer Bill Glover there, they formed Petra. Hartman became the principal (and most of the time, the sole) songwriter of the band, writing the lyrics and music for almost all of their songs.

In 1995, he felt he needed to take a break from touring but remained as the band de facto leader, songwriter, and producer. He also continued to play guitars on all of the albums despite not being featured on the album pictures or promotional material of the subsequent four albums - No Doubt, Petra Praise 2: We Need Jesus, God Fixation, and Double Take.

Amidst the struggles in the band during the late 90s, Hartman decided to officially return in 2001 for the release of the band's third praise album: Revival. In 2005, after much praying, he decided to retire the band after 33 years of ministry.

After Petra's retirement, Hartman started working with former Petra singer, John Schlitt, as II Guys from Petra in an album which was released on January 26, 2007 titled Vertical Expressions.

In 2010, Hartman and other members of the early lineups of Petra, reunited under the name Classic Petra. They released an album, Back to the Rock, with a tour that lasted until 2012.

In 2017, Hartman collaborated with missionary and guitarist Daniel Dossmann in releasing Guitar Legacy. Hartman produced, arranged and provided electric guitar to Dossmann's acoustic guitar on the album of praise and worship songs.

== Equipment ==
Guitars

- Ibanez Talman. Orange burst, white pickguard, Kent Armstrong lipstick pickups, non-locking tremolo
- Fender American Standard Strat. Black, white pickguard, stock single coil pickups and Roland synth pickup
- Gretsch Roundup. Pink-yellow burst, stock pickups, Bigsby vibrato tailpiece
- Zion Powerglide. Blue, black pickguard, EMG SA front & middle pickups, EMG T rear pickup, Floyd Rose
- Gibson Les Paul Junior. Mahogany body, routed Gibson front pickup, Seymour Duncan JB rear pickup, modified bridge
- Hamer Mirage. Koa body, Seymour Duncan Vintage Strat front & middle pickups, Rio Grande Muy Grande rear pickup and Wilkinson VSVG tremolo
