= Never Say Dinosaur =

Compilation album by Various
- Released: June 11, 1996
- Genre: Christian rock
- Length: 54:03
- Label: Star Song
- Producer: Darrell A. Harris

Professional ratings
Review scores
Source	Rating
Jesus Freak Hideout	4/5 stars
CCM Magazine	not rated

Never Say Dinosaur is a tribute album dedicated to Christian rock band Petra. The album includes 11 revisions and re-imaginings of classic Petra songs and one original composition by Kevin Smith of DC Talk. Dinosaur contained an eclectic lineup of artists which, at the time, highlighted "some of the best new bands in Christian music."

The album title is a pun on Petra's fourth studio album, Never Say Die. It is also a pun on the title of Petra's irrelevance and age, who at the time had been performing for nearly twenty-five years, by rejecting comparisons of the band with extinct dinosaurs.

The album was released by Star Song Records in 1996. They worked with the band during most of the 1980s through part of the band's most successful tenure.

== Track listing ==
Track	Song title	Originally released on	Cover band	Producer
1	"Taste and See"	Washes Whiter Than (1979)	Audio Adrenaline	John Hampton
2	"Judas' Kiss"	More Power to Ya (1982)	The Walter Eugenes	Nichols and Perkins
3	"Not of This World"	Not of this World (1983)	Galactic Cowboys	Alan Doss
4	"Yahweh Love"	Washes Whiter Than (1979)	Sarah Jahn	Paul Mills
5	"I Can Be Friends With You"	Never Say Die (1981)	MxPx	Bob Moon
6	"Rose Colored Stained Glass Windows"	More Power to Ya (1982)	Jars of Clay	Brent Bourgeois
7	"Louie's Solo"	Original song. Based on the title of, and including samples from a song off Captured in Time and Space (1986)	Kevin Max Smith/Passafist	Nichols and Perkins
8	"Road to Zion"	More Power to Ya (1982)	Sixpence None the Richer	Brent Bourgeois
9	"Pied Piper"	Not of this World (1983)	The Stand	Nichols and Perkins
10	"Wake Up"	Petra (1974)	Grammatrain	Grammatrain and Aaron Sprinkle
11	"The Coloring Song"	Never Say Die (1981)	Caprill and My Sister's Garden	Nichols and Perkins
12	"All the King's Horses"	This Means War! (1987)	Plankeye	Gene Eugene and Plankeye

== Personnel ==
- Executive producer - Darrell A. Harris
- Co-executive producers - Lynn Nichols, Dave Perkins
- Mastered by Steve Marcussen at Precision Mastering, Hollywood, California
- Project coordinator - Debby Austin
