= Doing My Best: Volume 1 =

Greatest hits album by Steve Camp
- Released: 1990
- Recorded: 1983–1988; 1990 ("Forgive Me, Forgive You" and "Run to the Battle")
- Studios: North Beach Studio (Franklin, Tennessee); Nightingale Studio, Duckworth Studio and MasterMix (Nashville, Tennessee)
- Genres: Contemporary Christian music, Christian rock
- Length: 57:36
- Label: Sparrow
- Producers: Steve Camp; John Rosasco; Phil Naish

Steve Camp chronology
Justice (1989)	Doing My Best: Volume 1 (1990)	Consider the Cost (1991)

Professional ratings
Review scores
Source	Rating
Allmusic	2/5 stars

Doing My Best: Volume 1 is a contemporary Christian music compilation album by Steve Camp and was released by Sparrow Records in 1990. This is the first of two compilation albums under this name. The album features songs from Camp's previous Sparrow releases, Fire and Ice, Shake Me to Wake Me, One on One, After God's Own Heart and Justice; as well as one new song ("Forgive Me, Forgive You") and a remake of "Run to the Battle."

== Track listing ==
1. "Run To The Battle" (Steve Camp) – 3:54
2. "Forgive Me, Forgive You (guest vocals by Ashley Cleveland)" (Steve Camp, Kim Maxfield-Camp) – 4:28
3. "He Covers Me" (Camp, Rob Frazier, John Rosasco) – 4:45
4. "Do You Feel Their Pain?" (Camp, Frazier, Maxfield-Camp, McHugh) – 6:25
5. "Whatever You Ask" (Camp) – 4:07
6. "He's All You Need" (Camp, Frazier) – 5:04
7. "Don't Tell Them Jesus Loves Them" (Camp, Frazier) – 5:20
8. "Stranger To Holiness" (Camp, Frazier) – 4:20
9. "Surrender Your Heart" (Camp, Frazier) – 4:44
10. "Love That Will Not Let Me Go" (Camp, Frazier) – 5:11
11. "Living In Laodicea" (Camp) – 4:06
12. "Revive Us, Oh Lord" (Steve Camp, Carman Licciardello) – 5:12

== Personnel ==
- Steve Camp – lead vocals
- Phil Naish – keyboards (1, 2)
- Jerry McPherson – guitars (1, 2)
- Jackie Street – bass (1, 2)
- Paul Leim – drums (1, 2)
- Chris Harris – backing vocals (1, 2)
- Mark Heimermann – backing vocals (1, 2)
- Chris Rodriguez – backing vocals (1, 2)
- Ashley Cleveland – featured backing vocals (2)
- Susanne Norman – additional vocals (9)

Production

- Phil Naish – producer (1, 2), arrangements (1, 2)
- Steve Camp – producer (3–12)
- John Rosasco – producer (3, 5, 6, 11, 12)
- James "JB" Baird – lead vocal recording (1, 2)
- Ronnie Brookshire – track engineer (1, 2), overdub engineer (1, 2), mixing (1, 2)
- Barry Dixon – assistant engineer (1, 2)
- Gary Paczosa – assistant engineer (1, 2)
- Greg Parker – mix assistant (1, 2)
- Denny Purcell – mastering at Georgetown Masters (Nashville, Tennessee)
- Cindy Wilt – production coordinator (1, 2)
- Barbara Hearn – art direction
- Wendy McFadden – design
- Mark Tucker – photography
