= Grammy Award for Best Gospel Vocal Performance by a Duo or Group, Choir or Chorus =

The Grammy Award for Best Gospel Vocal Performance by a Duo or Group, Choir or Chorus was awarded from 1984 to 1990. The award was originally titled Best Gospel Performance by a Duo or Group. This was changed to Best Gospel Performance by a Duo or Group, Choir or Chorus in 1986 and "Vocal" was added in 1990.

Years reflect the year in which the Grammy Awards were presented, for works released in the previous year.

== Recipients ==
Year	Winner(s)	Title	Nominees	Ref.
1984	Larnelle Harris, Sandi Patti	"More Than Wonderful"	Mylon LeFevre & Broken Heart for More; Gaither Vocal Band for No Other Name but Jesus; The Imperials for Side by Side; White Heart for White Heart	
1985	Debby Boone, Phil Driscoll	"Keep the Flame Burning"	Mylon LeFevre & Broken Heart for Live Forever; Steve Camp, Michele Pillar for Love's Not a Feeling; New Gaither Vocal Band for New Point of View; Petra for Not of This World	
1986	Larnelle Harris, Sandi Patti	"I've Just Seen Jesus"	Petra for Beat the System; DeGarmo and Key for Commander Sozo and the Charge of the Light Brigade; Randy Stonehill, Amy Grant for "I Could Never Say Goodbye"; The Imperials for Let the Wind Blow	
1987	Sandi Patti, Deniece Williams	"They Say"	Petra for Back to the Street; CeCe Winans, Carman for "Our Blessed Savior Has Come"; DeGarmo and Key for Street Light; First Call for Undivided	
1988	Mylon LeFevre & Broken Heart	Crack the Sky	Mr. Mister for Healing Waters; Petra for This Means War!; Stryper for To Hell With the Devil; Bill Gaither Trio for Welcome Back Home	
1989	The Winans	The Winans Live at Carnegie Hall	First Call for An Evening in December, Vol. 1; DeGarmo and Key for D&K; Whites for Doing It by the Book; BeBe & CeCe Winans for Silent Night, Holy Night	
1990	Take 6	"The Savior is Waiting"	Mylon LeFevre & Broken Heart for Big World; BeBe & CeCe Winans for Heaven; First Call for "O Sacred Head Now Wounded"; Petra for On Fire	
