= List of Billboard Top Inspirational Albums number ones of the 1980s =

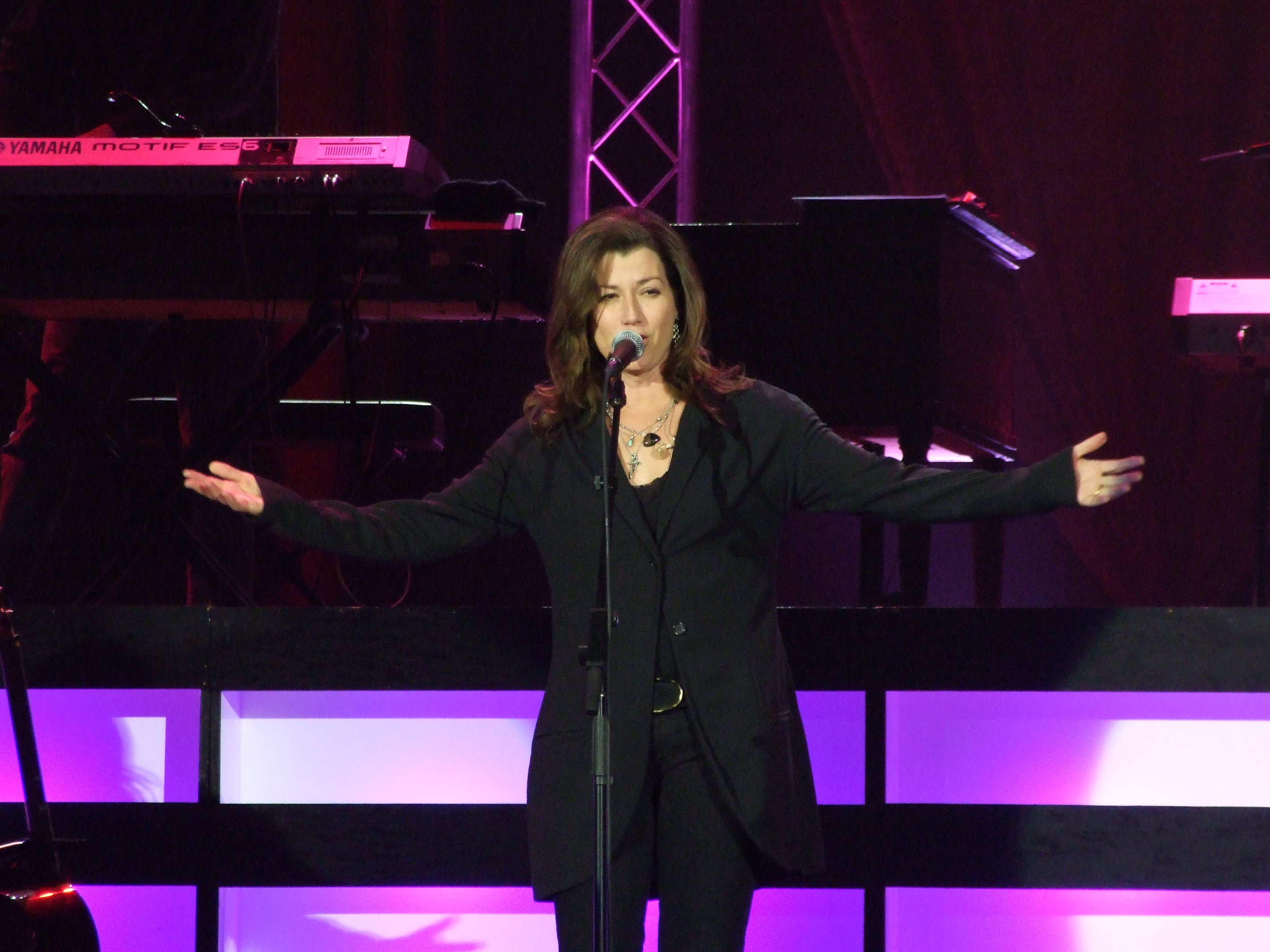
Amy Grant (pictured in 2008) placed eight albums atop the chart in the 1980s.

The Billboard Top Inspirational Albums chart ranks the best-selling Christian music albums of the week in the United States. In the 1980s, 28 albums by twelve different artists reached the top. The artist with the most number-one albums was Amy Grant, who placed eight albums for a total of 285 weeks atop. Her fourth studio album, Age to Age (1982), is the longest reigning album in the chart's history, with 85 consecutive weeks from July 1982 through March 1984.

== Number ones ==
Issue date	Album	Artist(s)	Wks.
March 29, 1980	Music Machine	Candle	3
April 19, 1980	One More Song For You	The Imperials	13
July 19, 1980	My Father's Eyes	Amy Grant	4
August 16, 1980	One More Song For You	The Imperials	5
September 20, 1980	Never Alone	Amy Grant	9
December 20, 1980	In His Time Praise IV	Maranatha Singers	9
January 24, 1981	Best of B.J. Thomas	B.J. Thomas	4
February 21, 1981	One More Song for You	The Imperials	4
March 21, 1981	Priority	The Imperials	17
July 18, 1981	Praise Five: Glorify Thy Name	Maranatha Singers	4
August 15, 1981	In Concert	Amy Grant	9
October 17, 1981	Amazing Grace	B.J. Thomas	9
December 19, 1981	Joni's Song	Joni Eareckson	13
March 20, 1982	Unfailing Love	Evie	9
May 22, 1982	I Saw the Lord	Dallas Holm	4
June 19, 1982	Amazing Grace	B.J. Thomas	4
July 17, 1982	Age to Age	Amy Grant	85
March 3, 1984	Not of this World	Petra	4
March 31, 1984	Straight Ahead	Amy Grant	61
June 1, 1985	Beat the System	Petra	12
August 24, 1985	Unguarded	Amy Grant	36
May 3, 1986	Morning Like This	Sandi Patti	40
February 7, 1987	The Collection	Amy Grant	12
May 2, 1987	Morning Like This	Sandi Patti	4
May 30, 1987	The Collection	Amy Grant	4
June 27, 1987	Morning Like This	Sandi Patti	20
November 14, 1987	This Means War!	Petra	4
December 12, 1987	The Collection	Amy Grant	25
February 13, 1988	Morning Like This	Sandi Patti	4
March 12, 1988	This Means War!	Petra	4
April 9, 1988	The Collection	Amy Grant	4
May 7, 1988	Make His Praise Glorious	Sandi Patti	16
August 27, 1988	Lead Me On	Amy Grant	28
March 11, 1989	i 2 (EYE)	Michael W. Smith	4
April 8, 1989	Lead Me On	Amy Grant	8
June 3, 1989	Sandi Patti and the Friendship Company	Sandi Patti	24
November 18, 1989	The Way Home	Russ Taff	4
December 16, 1989	Revival in the Land	Carman	3
