= Come and Join Us =

Studio album by Petra
- Released: 1977
- Studio: Golden Voice Studios, South Pekin, Illinois
- Genre: Christian rock
- Length: 35:37
- Label: Myrrh
- Producer: Austin Roberts

Petra chronology
Petra (1974)	Come and Join Us (1977)	Washes Whiter Than (1979)

Professional ratings
Review scores
Source	Rating
AllMusic	2/5 stars

Come and Join Us is the second studio album of the Christian rock band Petra. It was released in 1977.

The album continues with a style similar to the one of their previous album, which is something between country and Southern rock, with the exception of "Holy Ghost Power" which is a funk track. However, the music is more rock-oriented, and the lyrics show more depth.

Also - like their previous album - there is no lead singer per se. Instead, the lead vocals are handled by guitarists Bob Hartman and Greg Hough, and some guest singers. One of the guest singers is Greg X. Volz who later became the band's full-time singer.

== Producing ==
Bob Hartman wanted to title the album "God Gave Rock and Roll to You", after one of the songs. This song was written by Russ Ballard for his band Argent, and later became a rock music anthem, covered by other bands like Kiss (1991) and Bride (1993). However, Myrrh Records deemed it to be inappropriate and forced Hartman to change the title. Petra would cover that song again in 1984 on their seventh album, Beat the System.

Another drawback for Hartman was the exclusion of the song "Killing My Old Man". It was recorded for this album, but was dropped by Myrrh before the album was released. The song remained a staple in concert, though, and was eventually recorded for the 1981 album, Never Say Die.

== Track listing ==
All songs written by Bob Hartman, except where noted.

=== Vinyl ===
Side one

1. "God Gave Rock and Roll to You" (Russ Ballard) – 5:35
2. "Holy Ghost Power" – 2:26
3. "Woman Don't You Know" (Hartman & Hough) – 3:39
4. "Sally" (Greg Hough) – 4:25
5. "Come and Join Us" – 4:39

Side two

1. "Where Can I Go" – 3:51
2. "Without You (I Would Surely Die)" (Hough) – 4:27
3. "Ask Him In" – 3:30
4. "God Gave Rock and Roll to You" (reprise) (Ballard) – 2:48

=== CD ===
1. "God Gave Rock and Roll to You" (Russ Ballard) – 5:35
2. "Ask Him In" – 3:30
3. "Sally" (Greg Hough) – 4:25
4. "Without You (I Would Surely Die)" (Hough) – 4:27
5. "Come and Join Us" – 4:39
6. "Where Can I Go" – 3:51
7. "Holy Ghost Power" – 2:26
8. "Woman Don't You Know" (Hartman & Hough) – 3:39
9. "God Gave Rock and Roll to You" (reprise) (Ballard) – 2:48

Note: The 2011 reissue on Wounded Bird Records (on one disc with Petra) restores the original (i.e. vinyl) running order.

== Cover art ==
The cover art was done by Dennis Bellile while the band's logo was designed by Craig Yoe (Yoe-Yoe Studio).

== Personnel ==
Petra

- Bob Hartman - guitar, vocals
- Greg Hough - guitar, vocals
- John DeGroff - bass guitar

Guest musicians

- Bill Glover - drums, percussion
- Steve McElyea - keyboards
- Steve Mergen - percussion
- Allen C. Hornung - percussion
- Steve Pfeiffer - percussion
- Cowbell Bob - percussion
- Houghie I - percussion
- Steve Camp - percussion, guest vocals
- Greg X. Volz - guest vocals, lead vocal on "God Gave Rock and Roll to You" and "Woman Don't You Know"
- Karen Morrison - guest vocals
- Austin Roberts - guest vocals

Recording

- Terry Jamison - engineer
- Allen C. Hornung, Bill Olszewski - assistant engineer
- Arrangements by Petra
- Recorded at Golden Voice Studios, South Pekin, Illinois
- Mastered by Lanky Linstrot, ABC Records, Los Angeles, California

Production

- Austin Roberts - Producer
