= Abandoned to God =

Studio album by Steve Camp
- Released: 1999
- Recorded: 1999
- Studios: Sound House Studios and Mighty Fortress Studios (Nashville, Tennessee); Schnee Studios (North Hollywood, California); Worship center at Grace Community Church
- Genre: Christian music
- Length: 1:10:58
- Label: Ministry Music
- Producer: Steve Camp

Steve Camp chronology
The Steve Camp Collection (1995)	Abandoned to God (1999)	Desiring God (2002)

Abandoned to God is a contemporary Christian music album released by Steve Camp in 1999. This was the only album Camp released on the small Ministry Music label, and was released a year after Camp publicized his 107 Theses that he felt were needed for reformation in the contemporary Christian music industry. This album also features a then-little known Natalie Grant as a background vocalist. This is also the first album since Consider the Cost in 1991 that did not feature a remake of an earlier song. "Pledge My Head To Heaven" is a song originally performed by Keith Green, written for his 1980 album, So You Wanna Go Back To Egypt.

== Track listing ==
All tracks composed by Steve Camp, except where noted.

1. "Streams In The Desert" - 5:53
2. "Cornerstone" - 4:55
3. "My America" - 6:15
4. "The Mark Of A Man of God" - 5:37
5. "The Center Of The Father's Will" - 4:26
6. "Pilgrim's Progress" - 4:13
7. "Abandoned To God" - 4:44
8. "Pounding On Wittenberg's Door" - 4:32
9. "The Ministry" - 7:17
10. "'Til I Lost Myself In You" - 4:17
11. "Man of God" - 6:02
12. "Pledge My Head To Heaven" (Keith Green) - 4:05
13. "The Shepherd" - 4:33
14. "Here I Stand" - 4:06

== Personnel ==
- Steve Camp – vocals, acoustic piano, arrangements
- Scott Frankfurt – electric piano, organ, synthesizers, programming
- Michael Omartian – electric piano, synthesizers, organ
- Michael Thompson – acoustic guitars, electric guitars
- Jason Scheff – bass
- Leland Sklar – bass
- Warren Ham – flute, saxophones
- Mark Rice – arrangements
- Bill Champlin, Ashley Cleveland, Tim Davis, Rob Frazier, Natalie Grant and Jason Scheff – small group vocals

Choir

- Rose Stone – choir director
- Lisa Banks, Alice Echols, Mark Flores, Cederic Joins, Garth Justice, Carolyn Perry, Darlene Perry and Sharon Perry – singers

=== Production ===
- Steve Camp – producer, engineer
- Terry Christian – engineer
- Chris Rich – engineer
- Bill Schnee – engineer, mixing
- Doug Sax – mastering at The Mastering Lab (Hollywood, California)
