= Taking Heaven by Storm =

Taking Heaven By Storm

Studio album by Steve Camp
- Released: May 1993
- Recorded: 1993
- Studios: Soundhouse Studios and Lighthouse Recorders (North Hollywood, California); Tejas Recorders (Franklin, Tennessee)
- Genre: Contemporary Christian music
- Length: 42:21
- Label: Warner Alliance
- Producer: Michael Omartian

Steve Camp chronology
| Doing My Best: Volume 2 (1992) | Taking Heaven By Storm (1993) | Mercy in the Wilderness (1994) |

Professional ratings
Review scores
| Source | Rating |
|---|---|
| AllMusic | 3/5 stars |

Taking Heaven By Storm is a contemporary Christian music album by Steve Camp and was released by Warner Alliance in 1993, serving as Camp's debut with that label. This album is best known for the title track. This is the first non-compilation album to feature a recording of an earlier song, which Camp would do with some of his albums near the end of his recording career. Here, the song was "It's a Dying World"; from the 1984 Word release of the same name.

It was produced by Michael Omartian, who co-wrote some of the tracks and also produced the album Mercy in the Wilderness.

== Track listing ==
1. "Taking Heaven By Storm" (Camp, Rob Frazier, Michael Omartian) – 5:38
2. "Give Me Some Time" (Camp, Gary Chapman) – 4:01
3. "It's a Dying World" (Camp) – 4:44
4. "The Love I Found In You" (Camp, Chapman, Omartian) – 3:48
5. "He is Able" (Camp, Frazier) – 4:27
6. "I'm Not Ashamed" (Camp, Frazier) – 3:48
7. "I'm Committed to You" (Camp, Chapman, Frazier) – 4:00
8. "All Things For Good" (Camp, Frazier, Omartian) – 4:04
9. "The Lord's Prayer" (Camp, Omartian) – 4:33
10. "In the Hands of God" (Camp, Claire Cloninger, John G. Elliott) – 3:18

== Personnel ==
- Steve Camp – vocals, backing vocals, arrangements
- Michael Omartian – acoustic piano, keyboards, drum programming, backing vocals, arrangements
- Gary Chapman – guitars
- George Cocchini – guitars
- Dann Huff – guitars
- Joe Chemay – bass
- Jack Kelly – drums
- Paul Leim – drums
- Dan Higgins – saxophones
- Jerry Hey – trumpets
- Susanne Christian – backing vocals
- Kim Fleming – backing vocals
- Kurt Howell – backing vocals
- Marty McCall – backing vocals
- Chris Rodriguez – backing vocals
- Alfie Silas – backing vocals
- Linda Tavani – backing vocals

Production

- Neal Joseph – executive producer
- Michael Omartian – producer
- Terry Christian – recording, mixing
- Kevin Becka – assistant engineer
- Jim Dineen – assistant engineer
- Mick Higgins – assistant engineer
- John Hurley – assistant engineer
- Steve Hall – mastering at Future Disc (Hollywood, California)
- Janet Hinde – production coordinator
- Buddy Jackson – art direction
- Sam Knight – design
- Mark Tucker – photography
- Claudia McConnell – stylist
