= Hope (Petra album) =

Studio album by Petra
- Released: January 5, 2026
- Genres: Christian metal; hard rock
- Length: 35:14
- Label: Girder Music
- Producer: Petra

Petra studio albums chronology
Jekyll and Hyde (2003)	Hope (2026)

Petra chronology
Farewell (2005)	Hope (2026)

Singles from Hope
- 1. "Deliver Us" Released: September 26, 2025; 2. "Filthy Lucre" Released: February 17, 2026; 3. "Kiss the Coals" Released: March 17, 2026; 4. "Skin in the Game" Released: May 5, 2026

Hope is the twenty-first studio album recorded by the American Christian rock band Petra. It was released via Girder Music, to digital download and streaming formats on January 5, 2026, to CD formats on January 12, 2026, and to LP formats in March 2026. Hope marks Petra's first studio album in over twenty years, following Jekyll & Hyde (2003), and Petra's first album overall since Farewell (2005). It also marks their first studio album to be released via Girder Music.

Of its ten tracks, the album was supported by the release of four singles, "Deliver Us" on September 26, 2025, "Filthy Lucre" on February 17, 2026, "Kiss the Coals" on March 17, 2026, and "Skin in the Game" on May 5, 2026. "Deliver Us" peaked at No. 1 on the CR.net Christian Rock Chart, while "Filthy Lucre" peaked at number 22. The album was written by Bob Hartman, with two tracks written by both B. Hartman and Jeff Hartman, and produced by Petra. It was mixed by John Jaszcz and Nick Rad, and mastered by The Foxboro.

== Background ==
Girder Music noted that the timing of Hope's release "could not be more significant" because of being released at a time when "the world feels fractured, shaken by tragedy, and desperate for truth." Girder Music named specific events, in particular the assassination of Charlie Kirk, an American political activist, which they noted as a "reminder of our nation's division and unrest." The album was intended to bring hope and "fierce reliance on God's deliverance" in spite of the "chaos and fear."

In addition to being recorded and released as a reminder that "Jesus still offers hope," Hope was also released to celebrate the band's 50th anniversary. The album demonstrates the styles of Christian metal and hard rock. The track "Oxygen" maintained elements of reggae.

== Release and promotion ==
On September 23, 2025, it announced of the upcoming release of "Deliver Us", which would be the lead single to Hope. The song was supported by the release of a lyric video, which was premiered to YouTube upon release. Initially, Petra did not have the intention of releasing the song as a single, however, they decided to release it because they felt that "with recent events the time is urgent." "Deliver Us" is centered around the idea that "our battle is not against flesh and blood, but against the forces of darkness." It has been inspired by Ephesians 6:12–13, which states:

^{12} For our struggle is not against flesh and blood, but against the rulers, against the authorities, against the powers of this dark world and against the spiritual forces of evil in the heavenly realms. ^{13} Therefore put on the full armor of God, so that when the day of evil comes, you may be able to stand your ground, and after you have done everything, to stand.

— Ephesians 6:12–13, NIV

Hope had originally been announced for release in autumn of 2025, but was delayed until 2026. Preorders for CDs and LPs of the album were scheduled to be available on January 1, 2026. CDs would be released and shipped on January 12, 2026, while LPs would not be scheduled for shipment until March 2026. LPs were released with three color variants as collector editions. Subsequent to the album's commercial release, three tracks were release to Christian rock radio. "Filthy Lucre" was released on February 17, 2026, "Kiss the Coals" was released on March 17, 2026, and "Skin in the Game" was released on May 5, 2026, as the album's fourth and final single.

== Reception ==
Professional ratings
Review scores
Source	Rating
Front Row Report	9/10
Jesus Freak Hideout	4/5 stars

=== Critical ===
Speaking for Get Ready to Rock!, Jason Ritchie noted that the album takes the "rockier sound" of previous albums, particularly Jekyll & Hyde (2003), On Fire! (1988), and Beyond Belief (1990), in addition to adding "a few musical twists." He observed that "time has not diminished their lyrical and musical passion," but stated that the track "Oxygen" was "the one let down." Eternal Flames described Hope as a "triumphant return," praising its ability to blend "classic and fresh sounds with deep lyrics."

In a 9/10 review for Front Row Report, Reggie Edwards said of the album that it was less heavy than some previous Petra releases, but regardless, it "still packs a punch." He named "Kiss the Coals" and "Thorns" as prominent "stand-out tracks" from the album. However, he noted that Hope "is almost impossible to compare to previous Petra records" due to sounding notably different from other albums. Logan Sekulow of CCM Magazine stated that Hope "absolutely rewards a full listen"; however, he noted that its only fault was its "modern slickness of the production." Alternatively, Brad Bowman of HM Magazine said that the production was "stellar", having contained "rich vocal harmonies, crunchy guitars, and layered keys create a full, room-filling sound." He labelled "Filthy Lucre", "Skin in the Game", and "Miracle Maker" as standout tracks on the album.

=== Commercial ===
"Deliver Us", the album's lead single, peaked at No. 1 on the CR.net Christian Rock chart week dated to January 11, 2026. "Filthy Lucre" peaked at number 22 on the chart.

== Track listing ==
All songs are written by Bob Hartman and produced by Petra unless otherwise noted.

No.	Title	Writer(s)	Length
1.	"Filthy Lucre"		3:17
2.	"Kiss the Coals"	Bob Hartman; Jeff Hartman	2:59
3.	"Oxygen"		3:03
4.	"Skin in the Game"		3:38
5.	"We Rejoice in Hope"		3:27
6.	"Miracle Maker"		3:37
7.	"There Will Still Be a Dawn"	Bob Hartman; Jeff Hartman	3:23
8.	"Thorns"		3:49
9.	"Looking Back"		4:05
10.	"Deliver Us"		3:42
Total length:			35:14

== Personnel ==
Credits adapted from Tidal Music.

=== Petra ===
- Bob Hartman – guitars, writer
- Christian Borneo – drums
- Greg Bailey – bass, cello, background vocals
- John Lawry – keyboards, lute (1)
- John Schlitt – lead vocals

=== Additional musicians ===
- Eric Darken – percussion (3)
- Jenee Fleenor – violin (7, 9)

=== Technical ===
- Jeff Hartman – writer (2, 7)
- John Jaszcz – mixer (3, 7, 9)
- Nick Rad – mixer (1–2, 4, 6, 8, 10)
- The Foxboro – masterer (1–4, 6–10)

== Release history ==
Release history and formats for Hope
Region	Date	Format(s)	Label(s)	Ref.
Various	January 5, 2026	Digital download; streaming	Girder Music	
Various	January 12, 2026	CD	Girder Music	
Various	March 2026	LP	Girder Music	
