= Gravy Train (band) =

Band

- Origin: Lancashire, England
- Genre: Progressive rock
- Years active: 1969–1975
- Labels: Vertigo, Dawn

Gravy Train was a progressive rock group from Lancashire, England, formed by vocalist and guitarist Norman Barratt. Also featuring J.D. Hughes (keyboards, vocals, wind), Les Williams (bass, vocals) and Barry Davenport (drums), the band released its eponymous debut album in 1971, and went on to record a total of four studio albums. The first two were released on the Vertigo label, the remainder by Dawn Records.

== History ==
=== The meaning behind the name ===
Freelance journalist, broadcaster and lecturer John O’Regan wrote that, despite recording four albums, Gravy Train's "success rate did not befit their choice of name". The term, "Gravy Train", he commented, was northern slang for "an occupation or other source of income that requires little effort while yielding considerable profit".

The group gathered a considerable following among British Progressive Rock audiences with their live performances, along the way recording the debut Gravy Train (1970) and its follow-up (A Ballad of) a Peaceful Man (1971) on Vertigo, while a switch to Dawn Records yielded two further albums in Second Birth (1973) and Staircase to the Day (1974).

"Musically Gravy Train played melodic Progressive rock" — John O’Regan again — "with the accent on hard rock riffing alternating with quieter moments with the flute high in the mix topped with solid personable vocals from singer/guitarist/chief songwriter Norman Barratt. Gravy Train eventually foundered in 1975 through a combination of bad luck, poor business decisions and lack of success . . . However, with renewed interest in British and European Progressive Rock of the early 1970s, Gravy Train's output has garnered a considerable amount of interest from collectors and music fans alike. Their albums . . . have all been re-released on CD to positive feedback."

=== Early years ===
Gravy Train was formed in St. Helens in Lancashire, England in 1969. The original line-up had a considerable pool of talent from which to draw. Liverpool-born John Hughes had been a classically trained pianist. As a teenager, he played saxophone, self-taught, with various Merseybeat groups in the 1960s. O'Regan quotes him from an e-mail interview in March 2006 as saying: "Playing with a big soul band, Spaghetti House, I met bassist Les [Williams]. We formed a progressive rock band, where I played mainly flute and recruited Norm whom Les knew."

Singer/guitarist/songwriter Norman Barratt was born in Newton-le-Willows, halfway between Manchester and Liverpool, in 1949. After leaving school, he honed his guitar skills in local bands The Hunters (with whom he sometimes later still performed) and Newton's Theory, whilst holding down a day-job as a trainee accountant. After passing his accountancy exams, he turned professional, moving to London in the late Sixties with Newton's Theory.

Les had played in a St. Helens-based band called "The Incas", J.D. Hughes had been playing in Spaghetti House, and Barry had been part of a jazz outfit called "The John Rotherham Trio". Les and Barry moved to join J.D. in Spaghetti House. Barratt commented: "A mutual friend introduced me to the others who were looking, as I was, to form an original songs band, and not the usual covers band that we had all been used to up until that time". J.D. Hughes said: "We began rehearsing at St. Helens Cricket Club in the summer, I think, of 1969. I was still living at home in Liverpool, Les Williams and drummer Barry Davenport were from St. Helens and Norm from Earlestown, Lancs."

The band's had several influences: The Beatles, Jethro Tull, Roland Kirk and John Coltrane (J.D. Hughes), Eric Clapton, Jimi Hendrix and The Beatles (Norman Barratt), and The Beatles again (Les). Barry Davenport was influenced by jazz drummers Art Blakey, Buddy Rich and Joe Morello.

"Barry 's influence was immense in the early days," J.D. Hughes explained. "It was mainly his idea to write in unusual time signatures and arrange unison/harmony atonal instrumental passages. We all enjoyed long 'freak-outs' where we freely improvised, feeding off each other's ideas". On his departure after (A Ballad of) A Peaceful Man (he did play on three tracks on Second Birth), the writing became more melodic, much of the repertoire coming from Norman Barratt. However, the band still indulged in occasional "freak-outs".

=== Vertigo record contract ===
Gravy Train signed a contract with Vertigo Records, the in-house progressive label run by Philips Records (now Universal Music). Jonathan Peel produced Gravy Train's first three albums: Gravy Train, Ballad of a Peaceful Man and Second Birth. The first record was preceded by a single, the J.D. Hughes/Norman Barratt collaboration "So You’re Free", recorded at Olympic Studios, London and also produced by Jonathan Peel. "I wrote the chorus, and Norman wrote the rest," Hughes remembered.

Citing Vernon Johnson's inestimable "Tapestry of Delights" on the Progressive Rock Archives website, Marcel Coopman described Gravy Train as follows: "Starting like your typical Vertigo act, Gravy Train's first album sounds faintly like early Jethro Tull mainly due to similar flute lines, but without a dominating personality like Ian Anderson. Hard-rock riffing is alternated with more quiet and melodic moments and the flute is high in the mix throughout."

The group next released a single coupling "Alone in Georgia" and "Can Anybody Hear Me?" on Vertigo in the UK and by Phillips in (Germany). The second album followed, and Coopman on the Progressive Rock Archives website, in 2000, again cited "Tapestry of Delights" when he observed: "Much better is the surprisingly rare second album for Vertigo, (A Ballad of) A Peaceful Man. The solos are tighter and more controlled and the compositions are better. It is also less bluesy, very crisply produced and features good multi-part singing, greatly enriching their textures".

=== Barratt's "Christian perspective" ===
Norman Barratt had become a born again Christian at the end of 1969. John O'Regan quoted him as saying: "When we were making the first Gravy Train album, my old manager in The Hunters, Norman Littler, had become a Christian while I had been away touring and recording with the band. We had both spent years talking about God and the world and trying to make sense of it all. He heard the Gospel of Jesus Christ and it turned his life around. He told me about it months later when I was home visiting. When I read the family bible, a thing I'd never done before, I was deeply affected by what I read about who Jesus is and what he has done for all of us and committed my life to Him."

In this era, rock musicians that practised Christianity and worked within the secular progressive scene were a rarity. The contemporary Christian music scene in the UK was in its infancy and Cliff Richard would have been, apart from Terry Dene, the best-known example of a UK rocker embracing Christianity.

"The rest of the band were tolerant and sympathetic of my position," Barratt commented, "and the Record Companies never tried to dissuade me. The Christian experience influenced all of my lyrics for Gravy Train. Not overtly, but certainly they were written from a Christian perspective. I did not think that I had a right to 'preach' to audiences who had just come to hear the band and have a good time – although a lot of people who had read interviews in the music press did come backstage almost every night to find out what it was all about. Some of them were saved and are still going strong today; most of them did not but seemed to respect my beliefs. None ever ridiculed me."

=== Second Birth at Dawn Records ===
In 1973, Gravy Train moved from Vertigo to Dawn Records, the progressive offshoot of Pye Records. This produced Second Birth — eight tracks, two of which ("Strength of a Dream" and "Tolpuddle Episode") were released as a single. The album did not chart.

"Les mostly composed the second, George Harrison-sounding single, 'Strength of a Dream'," Hughes explained. "We recorded it at about the same time as Second Birth at Orange Studios [a small privately owned studio "somewhere in North London"], produced by Jonathan Peel . . . We tried to produce it ourselves, unsuccessfully, and eventually had to call in Jonathan Peel to complete the job. I always liked the episodic tracks, the ones, which passed through several contrasting moods e.g., the title track, 'Second Birth', and the instrumental arrangements in 'Motorway', plus the catchy tune and my alliterative lyrics make me think of that track with affection !"

=== Staircase to the Day and later efforts ===
The band had been unhappy with producer Jonathan Peel's work on the first three albums, specifically the records' sound. They then hired Vic Smith, who had produced Peter Sarstedt’s third United Artists album, Everything You Say (Is Written Down) and would later work with The Jam. Under his control, the band was a happier unit and felt their potential was at last being realised. Dawn records released it in the late summer of 1974.

Staircase to the Day was recorded at the Manor Studios, Kinnerton, Oxford and came wrapped in a Roger Dean-designed gatefold sleeve depicting a winged-space monster descending onto a cosmic landscape. It kicked off with one of Gravy Train's best-known Dawn Cuts, "Starbright Starlight", anthologised in various progressive samplers and compilation albums. Marcel Coopman (again citing Vernon Johnson) described it as "a blistering piece of melodious hard-rock, that sets the standard for similarly inclined music (though not many may have heard it, of course)."

The band was now a five-piece outfit with second guitarist George Lynon having joined before the sessions. Drummer Russ Caldwell replaced Barry Davenport after he left due to ill health. However, music equipment stolen from their van resulted in disillusionment for the members — "a huge setback", in Hughes' words. At this stage, he explained, "I became more involved in cabaret bands, only occasionally meeting the others for Gravy Train gigs. By the time we did Staircase to the Day, we were all playing in other bands. However, we never 'fell out' with each other and still enjoy each other's company on the rare occasions we get in touch."

The single, "Starbright Starlight"/"Good Time Girl" was issued in 1974, again unsuccessfully, as was the album. Gravy Train went through another line-up change with the departure of D. Hughes. Gravy Train released one final single for Dawn — "Climb Aboard the Gravy Train" backed by "Sanctuary" in 1975. But lack of commercial success, internal frustration, and financial losses led to the group disbanding.

=== After Gravy Train ===
Little is known about the subsequent lives of the band members. Barratt appeared in Mandalaband for their second and final album in 1978. He subsequently joined The Alwyn Wall band, a Christian rock ensemble, then went on to form the Barratt Band, which recorded two albums in the early 1980s and two solo albums Rock for all Ages (with Dave Morris, 1984) and Barratt (1988). He died in 2011 from post-surgery complications.

Les Williams has been working at Ocean Entertainments, an agency for bands and acts, since the 1980s. J.D Hughes is currently the founding member of The New Soul Messengers, in which he plays keyboards, saxophone, and vocals. George Lynon died in his sleep in 2002.

== Discography ==
=== Albums ===
- 1970: Gravy Train (Vertigo 6360023)
- 1971: (A Ballad of) A Peaceful Man (Vertigo 6360051)
- 1973: Second Birth (Dawn DNLS 3046/USA release BELL 1121)
- 1974: Staircase to the Day (Dawn DNLH 1)

=== Singles ===
- 1970: "The New One" / "Think Of Life" (Vertigo 6059 047) – French release
- 1971: "Alone in Georgia" / "Can Anybody Hear Me?" (Vertigo 6059 049)
- 1972: "London City" (Freedom) / "Alone In Georgia" (Gravy Train) (Vertigo AS 134) – Italy release
- 1973: "Strength of a Dream" / "Tolpuddle Episode" (Dawn DNS 1036)
- 1974: "Starbright Starlight" / "Good Time Girl" (Dawn DNS 1058)
- 1975: "Climb Aboard the Gravy Train" / "Sanctuary" (Dawn DNS 1115)

=== Compilations ===
- 2006: Strength of a Dream: The Gravy Train Anthology (Castle Records)
