= Petra Means Rock =

Compilation album by Petra
- Released: January 1, 1989
- Recorded: 1981–1988
- Genres: Christian rock, CCM
- Length: 66:07
- Label: StarSong
- Producer: Darrell A. Harris

Petra chronology
| On Fire! (1988) | Petra Means Rock (1989) | Petra Praise: The Rock Cries Out (1989) |

Professional ratings
Review scores
| Source | Rating |
|---|---|
| AllMusic | 3/5 stars |

Petra Means Rock is Petra's first compilation album. It was released by StarSong in 1989.

== Track listing ==
| No. | Title | Writer(s) | Length |
|---|---|---|---|
| 1. | "Stand Up" | Hartman | 3:33 |
| 2. | "Get On Your Knees and Fight Like a Man" | Hartman | 4:32 |
| 3. | "Hit You Where You Live" | Hartman | 4:20 |
| 4. | "Killing My Old Man" | Hartman | 3:46 |
| 5. | "Shakin' the House" | Hartman/Lawry | 4:26 |
| 6. | "Second Wind" | Hartman | 4:32 |
| 7. | "Clean" | Hartman | 3:01 |
| 8. | "Not By Sight" | Slick | 3:20 |
| 9. | "All Fired Up" | Hartman | 4:30 |
| 10. | "Praise Ye The Lord" | Volz | 3:18 |
| 11. | "He Came, He Saw, He Conquered" | Hartman | 4:10 |
| 12. | "Without Him We Can Do Nothing" | Volz | 2:36 |
| 13. | "Angel of Light" | Hartman | 4:21 |
| 14. | "Judas' Kiss" | Hartman | 4:43 |
| 15. | "Let Everything That Hath Breath" | Volz | 4:21 |
| 16. | "Counsel of the Holy" | Lawry/Kingen | 3:37 |
| 17. | "God Gave Rock and Roll to You" | Russ Ballard | 3:01 |

== Personnel ==
=== Petra ===
- Bob Hartman - Lead guitar, acoustic guitar, vocals (all tracks)
- Greg X. Volz - Lead vocals, rhythm guitar, percussion (tracks 1, 4, 6–8, 10, 12–15, 17)
- John Slick - Keyboards, vocals (tracks 1, 4, 6, 8, 10, 12–15)
- Mark Kelly - Bass, vocals (tracks 1–2, 4–8, 10–15, 17)
- Louie Weaver - Drums, vocals (tracks 1–3, 5–9, 11, 14–17)
- John Schlitt - Lead vocals (tracks 2–3, 5, 9, 11, 16)
- John Lawry - Keyboards, vocals (tracks 2–3, 5, 7, 9, 11, 16–17)
- Ronny Cates - Bass guitar (tracks 3, 9, 16)

=== Additional musicians ===
- John Elefante - Additional keyboards, vocals
- Keith Edwards - Drums (tracks 4, 10, 12–13)
- Alex MacDougall - Percussion
- Joe Miller - Trombone
- Bob Welborn - Trumpet
