= Doing My Best: Volume 2 =

Compilation album by Steve Camp

Greatest hits album by Steve Camp
- Released: 1992
- Recorded: 1992
- Genre: Christian music, Rock
- Length: 1:01:57
- Label: Sparrow
- Producer: Steve Camp; John Rosasco

Steve Camp chronology
Consider the Cost (1991)	Doing My Best: Volume 2 (1992)	Taking Heaven by Storm (1993)

Professional ratings
Review scores
Source	Rating
AllMusic	2/5 stars

Doing My Best: Volume 2 is a contemporary Christian music compilation album by Steve Camp and was released by Sparrow Records in 1992. This is the second compilation album until this title, following 1990's Doing My Best: Vol. 1 and was Camp's final release on the Sparrow label, as he moved to the Warner Alliance label the following year. Unlike the first Doing My Best release, this album contained songs with a heavier rock sound and no new songs.

== Track listing ==
All tracks by Steve Camp and Rob Frazier, except where noted.

1. "Fire And Ice" – 2:55
2. "Foolish Things" – 4:01
3. "Living Dangerously In The Hands Of God" – 5:08
4. "One On One" (Margaret Becker, Camp) – 4:32
5. "Squeeze" – 4:57
6. "After God's Own Heart" (Camp, Frazier, John Rosasco) – 5:16
7. "Even Now" – 3:59
8. "Playing Marbles With Diamonds" – 5:00
9. "Help Is On The Way" (Buckley-Frazier, Camp) – 4:05
10. "Shake Me To Wake Me" – 4:33
11. "Love's Not A Feeling" – 4:17
12. "The Church Is All Of You" (Camp, Rosasco) – 5:28
13. "Lazy Jane" – 3:21
14. "I Believe In You" – 4:25

== Personnel ==
- Steve Wyer – executive producer (1, 5, 11)
- Steve Camp – producer
- John Rosasco – producer (1, 2, 4–6, 11, 12)
- Heather Horne – art direction
- Garrett Rittenberry – design
- Mark Tucker – photography
