= For Every Man =

Album by Steve Camp

Studio album by Steve Camp
- Released: 1981
- Recorded: 1981
- Studio: Lower Level Studio, Nashville, Tennessee; The Gold Mine, Brentwood, Tennessee; Pinebrook, Alexandria, Indiana
- Genre: Christian music, rock
- Label: Myrrh
- Producer: Keith Thomas

Steve Camp chronology
Start Believin' (1980)	For Every Man (1981)	Only the Very Best (1983)

For Every Man is the third contemporary Christian music album by Steve Camp. It was released by Myrrh Records in 1981. This album introduced what would become one of Camp's best known songs, "Run to the Battle".

== Track listing ==
1. "Jesus on Our Side" (Steve Camp, Russ Hollingsworth) - 3:25
2. "Gimme What it Takes" (Keith Thomas) - 3:29
3. "Farther and Higher" (Thomas) - 3:16
4. "Jesus Is Drawing Me" (Camp) - 4:12
5. "The Net of Peter" (Camp) - 4:10
6. "Thank You" (Camp, Howard McCrary) - 3:25
7. "The Only Story (Written in My Life)" (McCrary, Thomas) - 2:36
8. "You Just Talk to Me" (Camp, Carol Frazier, Rob Frazier, Hank Neuberger) - 3:40
9. "Run to the Battle" (Camp) - 3:46
10. "Back in the Furnace" (Camp) - 4:48
11. "For Every Man" (Camp) - 1:20

Note: Never released on CD

== Personnel ==
- Steve Camp – lead vocals, backing vocals (6–8), acoustic guitar (8, 9), acoustic piano (11)
- Keith Thomas – Fender Rhodes (1, 4, 8), acoustic piano (1–3, 5, 7, 9, 10), backing vocals (1–3, 6, 7)
- Howard McCrary – Wurlitzer organ (2, 5), Fender Rhodes (3, 7, 10), acoustic piano (6), backing vocals (6, 7), synthesizers (7), organ (9)
- Randy Hammel – synthesizers (5)
- Jon Goin – guitars (1–7, 10), 12-string guitar (8), acoustic guitar (9), electric guitar (9)
- Sonny Garrish – steel guitar (8)
- Bob Wray – bass (1)
- Larry Paxton – bass (2, 8, 10)
- Steve Dokken – bass (3, 5–7, 9)
- Mark Hammond – drums (1, 2, 5, 6, 8, 10)
- Kenny Malone – drums (7, 9)
- Terry McMillan – percussion (1–7, 9)
- Denis Solee – flute (4)
- Paul Libman – horn arrangements (2, 6)
- Bergen White – string arrangements (3)
- Don Hart – string arrangements (4, 10)
- Diana DeWitt – backing vocals (1–3)
- Gary Pigg – backing vocals (1, 2)
- Donna Cooper – backing vocals (3)
- Russ Taff – backing vocals (6)
- Joan Anderson – backing vocals (9, 11)
- Diane Thiel – backing vocals (9, 11)
- Kevin Thiel – backing vocals (9, 11)

Production

- Neal Joseph – executive producer
- Keith Thomas – producer
- Hank Neuberger – co-producer, engineer
- Richard Achor – additional engineer
- John Bolt – additional engineer
- Ben Harris – additional engineer
- Randy Holland – additional engineer
- Chicago Recording Company, Chicago, Illinois – remixing location
- Hank Williams – mastering at Woodland Mastering, Nashville, Tennessee
- Dennis Hill – inner sleeve design
- Jim Osborne – design, layout
- Alan Messer – photography
