= It's a Dying World =

Studio album by Steve Camp
- Released: November 1984
- Recorded: 1983
- Studios: Chapel Lane Studios (Hereford, UK)
- Genre: Christian rock
- Length: 37:01
- Label: Myrrh
- Producer: Steve Camp

Steve Camp chronology
Fire and Ice (1983)	It's a Dying World (1984)	Shake Me to Wake Me (1985)

Professional ratings
Review scores
Source	Rating
AllMusic	2/5 stars

It's a Dying World is a Christian rock album by Steve Camp and was released by Myrrh Records in 1984. This was Camp's final album for Myrrh Records, but was not released until after Camp released Fire and Ice with Sparrow in late 1983.

== Track listing ==
All songs written by Steve Camp, except where noted.

1. "Holding on to You" (Camp, Rob Frazier) - 3:43
2. "Don't Wanna Be Friends" - 3:18
3. "It's a Dying World" - 3:49
4. "You Comfort Me" (Dana Key, Eddie DeGarmo, Mylon LeFevre) - 3:20
5. "You Know What's Right" (Carol Frazier, R. Frazier, Camp) - 3:19
6. "Light Your Candle" - 3:19
7. "I Don't Live by Chance" - 3:25
8. "Tongue is a Fire" - 5:04
9. "Can You Sleep Tonight" - 3:53
10. "Man Does Not Live" - 3:27
- A version of "Light Your Candle" was also released on Camp's 1983 album, Fire and Ice. This album was recorded before Fire and Ice, but released after. The version used here is the original, as Camp added the line "Let it burn bright in the face of the devil" in the chorus for Fire and Ice.

== Personnel ==
- Steve Camp – vocals, backing vocals, acoustic guitars, arrangements
- Dave Morris – keyboards, acoustic piano, arrangements
- Norman Barratt – electric guitars, arrangements
- Larry Tomaso – bass, arrangements
- Russell Caldwell – drums, arrangements
- Joan Anderson – backing vocals
- Diane Thiel – backing vocals

Production

- Steve Wyer – executive producer
- Steve Camp – producer, mixing
- Paul Cobbold – engineer
- Hank Neuberger – mix-down engineer, mixing
- Chicago Recording Company (Chicago, Illinois) – mixing location
- Dlorah L. Abdi – art direction
- Camille Brown – design, design concept
- Roy Harwood – special airbrush effects
- Steve G.S. Morgan – cover background and sleeve photography
- Phillip Radcliffe – cover people photography
