= Consider the Cost =

Studio album by Steve Camp
- Released: 1991
- Recorded: 1991
- Studios: Quad Studios, Javelina Recording Studios and Treasure Isle (Nashville, Tennessee); Classic Recording and North Beach Productions (Franklin, Tennessee); Morningstar Sound Studios (Hendersonville, Tennessee)
- Genre: Contemporary Christian music
- Length: 47:43
- Label: Sparrow
- Producer: Phil Naish

Steve Camp chronology
Doing My Best: Volume 1 (1990)	Consider the Cost (1991)	Doing My Best: Volume 2 (1992)

Professional ratings
Review scores
Source	Rating
AllMusic	4.5/5 stars

Consider the Cost is a contemporary Christian music album by Steve Camp and was released by Sparrow Records in 1991. This was Camp's first album of new material since 1989's Justice and also featured a less-rock oriented sound than most of his previous releases on Sparrow.

== Track listing ==
All songs written by Steve Camp, except where noted.

1. "The Cross Is a Radical Thing" – 4:23
2. "For Every Time" (S. Camp, Kim Maxfield-Camp, Rob Frazier, Steven Curtis Chapman) – 4:19
3. "Carry Me" (S. Camp, Maxfield-Camp, Frazier) – 4:07
4. "Shade for the Children" – 5:28
5. "Consider the Cost" – 5:51
6. "Follow Me" – 3:26
7. "Could I Be Called a Christian" – 5:33
8. "The Agony of Deceit" – 5:27
9. "Guard the Trust" – 4:19
10. "All That I Need" (S. Camp, Maxfield-Camp, Frazier, Kemper Crabb) – 4:30

== Personnel ==
- Steve Camp – vocals, backing vocals, acoustic piano, track arrangements
- Phil Naish – acoustic piano, synthesizers, track arrangements
- Dan Lee – guitars
- Leland Sklar – bass
- Paul Leim – drums
- Terry McMillan – percussion
- Chris McDonald – trombone, horn arrangements
- Barry Green – trombone
- Mike Haynes – trumpet
- George Tidwell – trumpet
- Paul Buckmaster – string arrangements and conductor
- Carl Gorodetzky and The Nashville String Machine – strings
- Mark Heimermann – backing vocals
- Chris Rodriguez – backing vocals
- Lisa Bevill – backing vocals (9)
- Ashley Cleveland – backing vocals (9)
- Vicki Hampton – backing vocals (9)

Production

- Phil Naish – producer
- Ronnie Brookshire – engineer
- Bill Schnee – mixing
- Doug Sax – mastering at The Mastering Lab (Hollywood, California)
- Wendy Holt – production coordinator
- Heather Horne – art direction, design
- Mark Tucker – photography
- Nancy Nimoy – illustration
- Bob Angelotti for The Brokaw Company – personal representation
