= After God's Own Heart =

Studio album by Steve Camp
- Released: 1987
- Recorded: 1987
- Studios: Ocean Way Recording (Hollywood, California); Bill Schnee Studios (North Hollywood, California); Mad Hatter Studios (Los Angeles, California)
- Genres: Contemporary Christian music, rock
- Length: 51:33
- Label: Sparrow
- Producers: Steve Camp; John Rosasco

Steve Camp chronology
One on One (1986)	After God's Own Heart (1987)	Compact Favorites (1988)

Professional ratings
Review scores
Source	Rating
AllMusic	2/5 stars

After God's Own Heart is a contemporary Christian music album by Steve Camp and was released by Sparrow Records in 1987. This album is best known for featuring his version of the song "Revive Us, O Lord", which he co-wrote with Carman (who recorded the song on his 1985 album, The Champion)

== Track listing ==
1. "Come to the Lord" (Steve Camp, John Rosasco) – 3:24
2. "The Church is All of You" (Camp, Rosasco) – 5:30
3. "Whatever You Ask" (Phil McHugh, Michele Wagner) – 4:08
4. "Who Knows" (Camp, Rosasco) – 4:14
5. "When I Survey the Wondrous Cross" (Isaac Watts; Additional lyrics: Camp, Rosasco) – 5:30
6. "Nothing to Prove" (Camp, John Fischer) – 4:40
7. "After God's Own Heart" (Camp, Rosasco, Rob Frazier) – 5:18
8. "If it Wasn't for the Grace of God" (Camp, Rosasco, Margaret Becker) – 4:41
9. "Hopeless Sinners, Helpless Saints (Camp, Rosasco) – 5:12
10. "Revive Us, O Lord" (Camp, Carman Licciardello) – 5:15
11. "Till These Earthly Days Shall End" (Camp) – 4:03

== Personnel ==
- Steve Camp – vocals, backing vocals, synthesizer programming, E-mu SP-12 programming
- Alan Pasqua – keyboards, synthesizer programming, acoustic piano solo (4)
- Smitty Price – keyboards, synthesizer programming
- John Rosasco – keyboards, Hammond B3 organ, B3 organ solo (3), acoustic piano solo (5), orchestration, brass section conductor
- Dann Huff – guitars, guitar solo (3)
- Leland Sklar – bass (1–9, 11)
- Joe Chemay – bass (10)
- John Robinson – drums, percussion, drum programming
- Alan Palmer – alto saxophone, tenor sax solo (2)
- Mark Watters – baritone saxophone, string conductor, chamber group conductor
- Jon Clarke – tenor saxophone, oboe, English horn
- Brandon Fields – tenor sax solo (3)
- Charles Morillas – trombone
- Daniel Fernero – trumpet
- John Fumo – trumpet
- Calvin Smith – French horn
- Amy Shulman – harp
- Margaret Becker – backing vocals
- Bob Bennett – backing vocals
- Bob Carlisle – backing vocals
- Pete Carlson – backing vocals
- Tamara Champlin – backing vocals
- Bridgett Evans – backing vocals
- Tommy Funderburk – backing vocals
- Steve Lively – backing vocals
- Kim Maxfield – backing vocals
- Michele Pillar – backing vocals
- Mark Williamson – backing vocals

Production

- Steve Camp – producer, arrangements
- John Rosasco – producer, arrangements
- Bill Schnee – mixing
- Terry Christian – recording
- David Schober – recording
- Gabe Veltri – recording
- Koji Egawa – assistant engineer
- Wade Jaynes – assistant engineer
- Larry Mah – assistant engineer
- Joe Schiff – assistant engineer
- Bart Stevens – assistant engineer
- Mike Reese – mastering at The Mastering Lab (Hollywood, California)
- Tammy Allcock – production coordinator
- Bill Francis – music preparation
- Barbara Catanzaro-Hearn – art direction
- 5 Penguins Design – design
- Steven Heller – photography
