= GHFS =

GHFS may refer to:

- Global High Frequency System, a U.S. Air Force communications system, the former name of the High Frequency Global Communications System
- Gothenburg Historical Fencing School, Gothenburg, Sweden; a historical European martial arts (HEMA) school
- Guelph-Humber Finance Society, University of Guelph-Humber, Toronto, Ontario, Canada

== See also ==
- GHF (disambiguation) for the singular of GHFs
