= Desiring God =

Desiring God may refer to:

- Desiring God (ministry), a ministry founded by John Piper
- Desiring God (album), an album by Steve Camp
