= Barratt (album) =

Studio album by Norman Barratt
- Released: 1988
- Genre: Christian music
- Label: Edge ECD7004
- Producer: Norman Barratt; Steve Boyce-Buckley; Trevor Taylor

Barratt is the only solo album released in 1988 by Norman Barratt. Barratt was previously a member of the Alwyn Wall Band and the Barratt Band. In 1984, following the breakup of the band, he released a worship album Rock for all Ages with Dave Morris, the Barratt Band's keyboard player.

== Track listing ==
- All songs written and arranged by Norman Barratt.
1. "The Last Night"
2. "I Know Where You Are"
3. "I Can See It in Your Eyes"
4. "Now I Know"
5. "Automatic Life"
6. "Still Waitin'"
7. "When the Night Comes"
8. "Sing a New Song"

== Personnel ==
- Norman Barratt: Guitars, vocals, additional programming
- Steve Boyce-Buckley: Keyboards
- Mark Olly: Percussion

== Production notes ==
- Produced by Norman Barratt, Steve Boyce-Buckley and Trevor Taylor (Vocals on "Now I Know")
- Engineered by Steve Boyce-Buckley
- Mixed by Norman Barratt and Steve Boyce-Buckley
- Assistant engineers: Bob Little, Damon Gough (a.k.a. Badly Drawn Boy) and John Barratt
- Programming by Steve Boyce-Buckley
- Guitar effects and programming by Neil Costello
- Recorded at Square 1 Studios, Bury, England
- The album was recorded using a 40 channel AMEK 2025 with automation and an OTARI MTR90 analogue machine. Computer programming was achieved via an ATARI ST1040 running PRO24. The album took around four weeks to record and about ten days to mix.

== CD re-issue ==
1991 Reguge Records, 790-060-5509
