= Gravy Train (Gravy Train album) =

Studio album by Gravy Train
- Released: 1970
- Recorded: 1970
- Studio: Olympic Sound Studios, London, England
- Genre: Progressive rock; hard rock
- Length: 47:16
- Label: Vertigo (original British & European release); Polydor (original US release); Repertoire (1990 German and 2005 British reissues)
- Producer: Jonathan Peel (for Mike Vaughn Productions)

Gravy Train chronology
Gravy Train (1970)	(A Ballad of) A Peaceful Man (1971)

Professional ratings
Review scores
Source	Rating
Allmusic	4/5 stars

Gravy Train is the 1970 debut album by progressive rock band Gravy Train.

== Reception ==
Dave Thompson of AllMusic praised the album, writing of its influences, "Jethro Tull and Comus had a baby, and they named it Gravy Train." He compared the track "Think of Life" to Deep Purple due to its flute part. Thompson noted that, "If Gravy Train has any faults whatsoever, the fascination with peculiar vocal effects can grow a little wearing, especially as frontman Norman Barrett [sic] already appears to have a fabulous range of his own – "Dedication to Sid", in particular, glories in such trickery, although the heartbeat bassline that runs through the number is so hypnotic that it's easy to forget everything else that's going on." He concluded that the album was "a genuine minor classic."

== Track listing ==
All tracks are written by Gravy Train.

Side one
No.	Title	Length
1.	"The New One"	5:14
2.	"Dedication to Sid"	7:25
3.	"Coast Road"	6:50
4.	"Enterprise"	6:23

Side two
No.	Title	Length
5.	"Think of Life"	5:10
6.	"Earl of Pocket Nook"	16:14
Total length:		47:16

== Personnel ==
- Norman Barratt – guitar, vocals
- Barry Davenport – drums
- J.D. Hughes – keyboards, vocals, wind
- Lester Williams – bass, vocals
