= Petra (album) =

Studio album by Petra
- Released: 1974
- Recorded: 1974
- Genre: Christian rock, country rock, Southern rock
- Length: 34:04
- Label: Myrrh
- Producer: Billy Ray Hearn

Petra chronology
Petra (1974)	Come and Join Us (1977)

Professional ratings
Review scores
Source	Rating
AllMusic	3/5 stars

Petra is the first studio album by the Christian rock band of the same name. It was released in 1974.

The album features Midwestern roots rock'n'roll, country rock and southern rock, which was the band's trademark during its first years.

The band's debut is more raw than later Petra albums, lacking the refined production values of future releases. It was recorded on a limited budget of $1,000 during the span of two weeks. Nevertheless, this first record displays remarkable guitar technique with many dual guitar solos reminiscent of the Allman Brothers, Wishbone Ash, Thin Lizzy, and other bands from the period who employed harmony leads.

Unlike later Petra albums, lead vocal duties are shared by guitarists Bob Hartman and Greg Hough.

== Track listings ==
All songs written by Bob Hartman, except where noted.

Vinyl Side one

1. "Walkin' in the Light" – 3:16
2. "Mountains and Valleys" – 2:48
3. "Lucas McGraw" – 3:24
4. "Wake Up" (Greg Hough) – 3:40
5. "Back Sliding Blues" – 4:29

Side two

1. "Get Back to the Bible" – 2:23
2. "Gonna Fly Away" – 4:55
3. "I'm Not Ashamed" (Hough/Hartman) – 3:01
4. "Storm Comin'" – 4:30
5. "Parting Thought" – 1:31

CD

1. "Wake Up" (Greg Hough) – 3:40
2. "Get Back to the Bible" – 2:23
3. "Gonna Fly Away" – 4:55
4. "Storm Comin'" – 4:30
5. "Parting Thought" – 1:31
6. "Walkin' in the Light" – 3:16
7. "Mountains and Valleys" – 2:48
8. "Lucas McGraw" – 3:24
9. "Backslidin' Blues" – 4:29
10. "I'm Not Ashamed" (Hough) – 3:01

== Personnel ==
- Bob Hartman - guitar, banjo, vocals
- Greg Hough - guitar, mandolin, vocals
- Bill Glover - drums, percussion, bass on "Lucas McGraw"
- John DeGroff - bass guitar, guitar on "Lucas McGraw"
- Billy Ray Hearn - producer
