= One on One (Steve Camp album) =

Studio album by Steve Camp
- Released: 1986
- Recorded: 1986
- Studios: Bill Schnee Studios and Weddington Studios (North Hollywood, California)
- Genres: Contemporary Christian music, Christian rock
- Length: 41:34
- Label: Sparrow
- Producers: Steve Camp; John Rosasco

Steve Camp chronology
Shake Me to Wake Me (1985)	One on One (1986)	After God's Own Heart (1987)

Professional ratings
Review scores
Source	Rating
AllMusic	2/5 stars

One on One is a contemporary Christian music album by Steve Camp and was released by Sparrow Records in 1986.

== Track listing ==
1. "Foolish Things" (Camp, Rob Frazier) – 4:01
2. "The Other Side of the World" (Camp) – 4:36
3. "Judgment Begins with the House of God" (Camp) – 3:42
4. "One on One"; duet with Margaret Becker (Camp, Margaret Becker) – 4:32
5. "He Covers Me" (Camp, Frazier, John Rosasco) – 4:45
6. "Cheap Grace" (Camp, Becker, Phil Madeira) – 5:10
7. "Mr. Brokenhearted" (Camp, Frazier, Rosasco) – 4:51
8. "Threshing Floor" (Camp, Ashley Cleveland) – 4:53
9. "He's All You Need" (Camp, Frazier) – 5:04

== Personnel ==
- Steve Camp – vocals, backing vocals, SP-12 drum machine programming
- Smitty Price – keyboards
- Dann Huff – lead guitar, rhythm guitars
- Michael Landau – rhythm guitars
- Leland Sklar – bass
- Jeff Porcaro – drums
- Daniel Greco – percussion
- Jon Clarke – English horn
- John Rosasco – orchestration
- Bob Carlisle – backing vocals
- Bill Champlin – backing vocals
- Tamara Champlin – backing vocals
- Tommy Funderburk – backing vocals
- Steve Lively – backing vocals
- Jason Scheff – backing vocals
- Margaret Becker – lead vocals (4)

Production

- Steve Camp – producer, arrangements
- John Rosasco – producer, arrangements
- Dennis MacKay – rhythm track engineer
- Bill Schnee – mixing
- Dan Garcia – additional engineer
- Peter Hayden – additional engineer
- Mike Ross – additional engineer
- David Schober – additional engineer
- Steve Hall – mastering at Future Disc (Hollywood, California)
- Jim Shanman – lyric sheet design, box design
- Stan Evenson – art direction, jacket design for Stan Evenson Design
- Phil Fewsmith – photography
- Sunbelt Management Group – management

== Notes ==
- "He's All You Need" was used in a scene during the 1999 film, The Moment After.
