= Back to the Street =

Studio album by Petra
- Released: 1986 September
- Genre: Christian rock, hard rock
- Length: 40:51
- Label: StarSong
- Producer: John & Dino Elefante

Petra chronology
Captured in Time and Space (1986)	Back to the Street (1986)	This Means War! (1987)

Professional ratings
Review scores
Source	Rating
AllMusic	2/5 stars

Back to the Street is the eighth studio album of the Christian rock band, Petra. It was released in 1986 and is the first album to be produced by John and Dino Elefante.

The album is also the first to feature new lead singer John Schlitt, former lead singer of Head East, and the last to feature a guitar-shaped space ship on its cover.

While the sound of the album is rather transitional and unlike anything that would be heard by the group for another seven years, it did mark a movement toward the style that would become Petra's most identifiable sound: prominent keyboards backing up hard-edged guitar tones and raspy, near-screaming vocals.

== Track listing ==
All songs written by Bob Hartman, except where noted.

1. "Back to the Street" – 4:14
2. "You Are I Am" – 3:08
3. "Shakin the House" (words by Hartman and John Lawry) – 4:28
4. "King's Ransom" – 4:18
5. "Whole World" – 4:50
6. "Another Crossroad" – 3:50
7. "Run for Cover" – 3:15
8. "Fool's Gold" – 4:48
9. "Altar Ego" – 4:43
10. "Thankful Heart" (words by Hartman and Dino Elefante) – 3:17

== Awards ==
- Nominated for Grammy Award for Best Gospel Performance in 1986.

== Personnel ==
Petra

- Bob Hartman – guitars, arrangements
- John Schlitt – lead vocals, backing vocals
- John Lawry – keyboards, Fairlight programming, background vocals
- Mark Kelly – bass guitar, background vocals
- Louie Weaver – drums

Additional personnel

- John Elefante – keyboards, backing vocals, arrangements
- Dino Elefante – arrangements

Production

- John Elefante – producer, engineer, mixing at Pakaderm Studio, Long Beach, California
- Dino Elefante – producer, engineer, mixing
- Mike Mireau – engineer
- Dave Rogers – art direction, cover design, concept
- Randy Rogers – art direction, cover design, concept, illustration
- Bill Brunt – art direction, photography
- Scott Bonner – photography
- Ron Keith – photography
