= Justice (Steve Camp album) =

Studio album by Steve Camp
- Released: 1989
- Recorded: 1988
- Studios: OmniSound Studios (Nashville, Tennessee); The Bennett House (Franklin, Tennessee); Bill Schnee Studios and Mama Jo's Recording Studios (North Hollywood, California)
- Genres: Contemporary Christian music, rock
- Length: 49:22
- Label: Sparrow
- Producer: Steve Camp

Steve Camp chronology
Compact Favorites (1988)	Justice (1989)	Doing My Best: Volume 1 (1990)

Professional ratings
Review scores
Source	Rating
AllMusic	4.5/5 stars

Justice is a contemporary Christian music album by Steve Camp and was released by Sparrow Records in 1989. Camp had begun to put more emphasis publicly on issues not normally addressed in evangelical Christian circles. This album is best known for featuring his version of the song "Do You Feel Their Pain", which featured him singing alongside BeBe Winans, the provocatively titled "Don't Tell Them Jesus Loves Them" ("...till you're ready to love them too..."), and Larry Norman's "Great American Novel".

== Track listing ==
All tracks by Steve Camp and Rob Frazier except where noted.

1. "Justice" - 4:35
2. "Playing Marbles with Diamonds" - 5:05
3. "Don't Tell Them Jesus Loves Them" - 5:19
4. "Living Dangerously in the Hands of God" - 5:04
5. "Do You Feel Their Pain?" (Camp, Frazier, Kim Maxfield-Camp, Phil McHugh) - 6:18
6. "Hell is Burning While the Church Sleeps" - 4:26
7. "Great American Novel" (Larry Norman) - 4:57
8. "Servants without Scars" - 4:04
9. "Love That Will Not Let Me Go" - 5:09
10. "I Believe in You" - 4:25

== Personnel ==
- Steve Camp – vocals, acoustic piano, synthesizers (4), drum machine programming (4)
- Phil Madeira – organ (1, 10)
- John Andrew Schreiner – synthesizers (2, 3, 5, 7, 8, 10)
- Carl Marsh – Fairlight programming (5, 6)
- Phil Naish – synthesizers (7)
- James Hollihan – guitars (1)
- Dave Perkins – guitars (1)
- Michael Landau – guitars (2, 3, 5–8)
- Al Perkins – pedal steel guitar (7)
- Jerry McPherson – guitars (8, 10)
- Leland Sklar – bass (1–3, 5–8, 10)
- Chris McHugh – drums (1)
- Carlos Vega – drums (2, 3, 5–8, 10)
- Terry McMillan – percussion (1–5, 8), harmonica (1, 8)
- Jim Horn – saxophone solo (5, 10)
- Paul Buckmaster – orchestration (3, 5, 9)
- London Symphony Orchestra – strings (3, 5, 9)
- Ashley Cleveland – backing vocals (1–8, 10)
- Marty McCall – backing vocals (1–3, 5, 6, 8, 10)
- Pam Tillis – backing vocals (1–3, 6)
- Rob Frazier – backing vocals (2, 4)
- Kim Maxfield-Camp – backing vocals (5)
- Rosemary Butler – backing vocals (5, 7, 8, 10)
- The Bobby Jones Nashville Choir – backing vocals (5)
- BeBe Winans – vocal solo (5)
- Margaret Becker – vocal solo (5)
- Steve Green – vocal solo (5)

Production

- Steve Camp – producer, arrangements
- David Schober – engineer, mixing (6, 8)
- Bill Schnee – mixing (1, 3, 5, 9)
- Jeff Balding – mixing (2, 4, 7, 10)
- Wade Jennings – assistant engineer
- Howard Steel – assistant engineer
- Carry Summers – assistant engineer
- Kevin Twit – assistant engineer
- Doug Sax – mastering at The Mastering Lab (Hollywood, California)
- Barbara Catanzaro-Hearn – art direction
- Peter Nomura – design, artwork
- Mark Tucker – collage photography
- Victoria Pearson – portrait photography

== Use in media ==
- The song "Don't Tell Them Jesus Loves Them" was used in the 1990 film, Geronimo.
