= Start Believin' =

Studio album by Steve Camp
- Released: 1980
- Recorded: 1980
- Studio: Chicago Recording Company (Chicago, IL)
- Genre: Christian rock; disco
- Label: Myrrh
- Producer: Morris Butch Stewart

Steve Camp chronology
Sayin' It with Love (1978)	Start Believin' (1980)	For Every Man (1981)

Start Believin' is a Christian rock album by Steve Camp and was released by Myrrh Records in 1980.

== Track listing ==
1. "The Feeling is Happening" (Morris "Butch" Stewart) - 6:02
2. "You Are the Rainbow" (Steve Camp) - 3:12
3. "Easy Livin' (Under the Sun)" (Camp) - 3:05
4. "Ambassador in Chains" (Camp) - 3:51
5. "Start Believin'" (Camp, Stewart, David Isaiah Radford) - 4:46
6. "Under His Love" (Camp, Larry Norman) - 3:35
7. "Do They Have to Grow Up?" (Paul Libman) - 3:56
8. "I'll Always Need You Lord" (Stewart) - 5:47
9. "Bobby" (Camp) - 5:19
10. "Psalm 131" (Camp) - 2:10

Note: Never released on CD

== Production ==
- Morris "Butch" Stewart – producer
- Steve Camp – co-producer
- Paul Libman – co-producer
- Hank Neuberger – recording, mixing
- Phil Bonono – additional engineer
- Gary Elgehammer – additional engineer
- Tommy Hanson – additional engineer
- Glenn Meadows – mastering at Masterfonics (Nashville, Tennessee)
- Michael Harris Design – art design, concept
- Michael Borum – photography

== Personnel ==
- Steve Camp – lead vocals, backing vocals (1, 4–9), arrangements (2–6, 9, 10), acoustic piano (9), guitars (10)
- Paul Libman – acoustic piano (1–8), clavinet (1), arrangements (2, 4–7), horn and string arrangements (2–7, 9), acoustic piano solo (4, 5), electric piano (6, 8, 10), backing vocals (7), Polymoog (9)
- Lonnie Reaves – electric piano (1), acoustic piano (8)
- Byron Gregory – guitars (1, 3–9)
- Beau MacDougall – guitars (1, 8)
- Rich Maisel – guitars (1, 3–9)
- Joe Godfrey – guitars (2, 7)
- Tony Brown – bass (1, 3–9)
- Steve Rodby – bass (2, 7), string bass (10)
- Wayne Stewart – drums (1, 3–9)
- Tom Ratdke – drums (2, 7)
- James Hampton – percussion (10)
- Ken Soderblom – English horn (3)
- Morris "Butch" Stewart – arrangements (1, 5, 8, 9), horn and string arrangements (1, 6, 8), backing vocals (1, 3–9)
- Kitty Haywood – backing vocals (1, 4–9)
- Ricky Linton – backing vocals (1, 4–9)
- Brenda Mitchell – backing vocals (1, 3–9)
- Mary Ann Stewart – backing vocals (1, 4–9)
- Alfonso Surrett – backing vocals (1, 4–9)
- Lilian Tynes – backing vocals (1, 4–9)

Horn section

- Ken Soderblom – alto saxophone
- Jack Baron and Ken Soderblom – tenor saxophone
- John Haynor, Art Lisner and Cy Touff – trombone
- Ron Friedman, Arthur Hoyle, Russ Iverson and Bobby Lewis – trumpet
- Arthur Hoyle and Bobby Lewis – flugelhorn
- Dale Clevenger and Thomas Howell – French horn

String section

- Philip Blum and Leonard Chausow – cello
- Richard Ferrin, Harold D. Klatz and Roger Moulton – viola
- Sol Bobrov, Joseph Golan, Samuel Magad, Arnold Roth and Fred Spector – violin
