= On Fire! =

Studio album by Petra
- Released: 1988
- Studio: Pakaderm (Los Alamitos, California); Woodland (Nashville, Tennessee)
- Genre: Christian rock, hard rock
- Length: 43:40
- Label: StarSong
- Producer: John & Dino Elefante

Petra chronology
This Means War! (1987)	On Fire! (1988)	Petra Means Rock (1989)

Professional ratings
Review scores
Source	Rating
AllMusic	2/5 stars
CCM Magazine	
Kerrang!	4.5/5 stars

On Fire! is the tenth studio album of the Christian rock band, Petra. It was released in 1988 by StarSong.

The songs of this album are in the hard rock category. The lyrics continue the theme of spiritual warfare featured in their previous efforts, with metaphors making reference to military subtexts ("Mine Field", "Defector"). The band also tackles issues such as homelessness ("Homeless Few") and other personal and social issues.

This is the first album to feature Ronny Cates on bass who would remain with the band until 1995. With his addition to the line-up, the band started their more stable period in terms of line-up. Schlitt, Hartman, Cates, Lawry and Weaver would remain together for seven years and six albums.

== Track listing ==
All songs written by Bob Hartman, except where noted.

1. "All Fired Up" – 4:30
2. "Hit You Where You Live" (music by Billy Smiley and Dino Elefante) – 4:20
3. "Mine Field" – 4:28
4. "First Love" (music by John Elefante) – 4:10
5. "Defector" – 4:30
6. "Counsel of the Holy" (words & music by John Lawry & Danny Kingen) – 3:37
7. "Somebody's Gonna Praise His Name" – 4:02
8. "Open Book" – 4:28
9. "Stand in the Gap" – 4:10
10. "Homeless Few" (music by John Lawry) – 4:33

== Awards ==
- Nominated for a Grammy Award for Best Gospel Performance in 1989.

== Personnel ==
Petra

- John Schlitt – lead vocals, backing vocals
- Bob Hartman – lead guitars, arrangements
- John Lawry – keyboards, computer programming, backing vocals, arrangements
- Ronny Cates – bass guitar
- Louie Weaver – drums

Additional musicians

- John Andrew Schreiner – keyboards, programming
- Tim Heintz – programming
- Bob Carlisle – backing vocals
- John Elefante – backing vocals, arrangements
- Riki Michele – backing vocals on "Homeless Few"
- Dino Elefante – arrangements

Production

- John Elefante – producer, engineer at Pakaderm Studio, Los Alamitos, California and Woodland Sound Studio, Nashville, Tennessee
- Dino Elefante – producer, engineer
- Mike Mireau – engineer
- Mannie Parker – assistant engineer
- Greg Parker – assistant engineer
- Jeff Simmons – assistant engineer
- Steve Hall – mastering at Future Disc, Hollywood, California
- Dave Rogers – art direction, design
- Ken Westphal – illustration
