= Rock for All Ages =

Studio album by Norman Barratt and Dave Morris
- Released: 1984
- Recorded: January 1984
- Genre: Christian music
- Label: Chapel Lane CLS8017
- Producer: Norman Barratt; Dave Morris; Derek Muuray

Rock for All Ages is the only album released by Norman Barratt and Dave Morris. Barratt and Morris were members of the Barratt Band and recorded this album following the band's breakup. Barratt released a solo album, Barratt, in 1988.

== Track listing ==
=== Side one ===
1. "Jerusalem" (Hubert Parry)
2. "I Will Serve You" (Norman Barratt)
3. "Evensong" (Dave Morris/Barratt)
4. "Lord We Thank You" (Barratt)
5. "Jacqueline Louise" (Barratt)

=== Side two ===
1. "Jesu, Joy of Man's Desiring" (JS Bach)
2. "On My Way Home" (Dave Morris/Barratt)
3. "Tribute" (Morris)
4. "Winds O'er the Sea" (Morris/Barratt)

== Personnel ==
- Norman Barratt: Guitar and Vocals
- Dave Morris: Keyboards

== Production notes ==
- Produced by Norman Barratt, Dave Morris and Derek Murray
- Engineered by Derek Murray
- Mixed by Norman Barratt, Dave Morris and Derek Murray
- Recorded at Chapel Lane Studios, Hampton Bishop, Hereford
