= Shake Me to Wake Me =

Studio album by Steve Camp
- Released: 1985
- Recorded: 1985
- Studios: Sunset Sound (Hollywood, California); Sunset Sound Factory (Los Angeles, California); Bill Schnee Studios and Weddington Studios (North Hollywood, California); Bullet Recording (Nashville, Tennessee)
- Genre: Christian rock
- Length: 42:10
- Label: Sparrow
- Producers: Steve Camp; Rob Frazier; John Rosasco

Steve Camp chronology
It's a Dying World (1984)	Shake Me to Wake Me (1985)	One on One (1986)

Professional ratings
Review scores
Source	Rating
AllMusic	2.5/5 stars

Shake Me to Wake Me is a contemporary Christian music album by Steve Camp, released by Sparrow Records in 1985.

== Track listing ==
All songs written by Steve Camp and Rob Frazier, except where noted.

1. "Help is on the Way" (Camp, Carol Buckley-Frazier) - 4:08
2. "Lazy Jane" - 3:20
3. "Surrender Your Heart"; Duet with Suzanne Norman - 4:44
4. "Bad News for Modern Man" (Camp) - 4:57
5. "Stranger to Holiness" - 4:24
6. "On the Edge" - 3:52
7. "Asleep in the Light" (Keith Green) - 4:01
8. "Shake Me to Wake Me" - 4:32
9. "Going Through the Motions" - 4:07
10. "Even Now" - 3:59

== Personnel ==
- Steve Camp – vocals, backing vocals, BGV arrangements
- Alan Pasqua – keyboards
- James Newton Howard – synthesizers
- Rhett Lawrence – synthesizers, Fairlight programming
- Smitty Price – synthesizers
- John Rosasco – synthesizers, synthesizer arrangements
- Dann Huff – guitars
- Michael Landau – guitars, lead guitar solo
- Dave Perkins – lead guitar solo
- Neil Stubenhaus – bass
- Paul Leim – drums, LinnDrum programming
- Jim Horn – saxophone
- Susie Allanson – backing vocals
- Carol Buckley-Frazier – backing vocals,
- Rob Frazier – backing vocals, BGV arrangements
- Marty McCall – backing vocals
- Gary Pigg – backing vocals
- Suzanne Norman – lead vocals (3)

Production

- Steve Wyer – executive producer, management
- Steve Camp – producer, arrangements, mixing
- John Rosasco – lead vocal producer
- Rob Frazier – production assistant on basic tracks
- Terry Christian – engineer, mixing
- Dan Garcia – assistant engineer
- Chris Hammond – assistant engineer
- Bill Heath – assistant engineer
- Alan Henry – assistant engineer
- Randy Holland – assistant engineer
- Peggy McCreary – assistant engineer
- Dan Mundhenk – assistant engineer
- Willie Pevear – assistant engineer
- Stephen Shelton – assistant engineer
- Steve Hall – mastering
- Herb Melton – mastering
- Future Disc (Hollywood, California) – mastering location
- Raul Vega – photography
- Rique – image design
- Steve Cox – lyric sheet design
