= (A Ballad of) A Peaceful Man =

Studio album by Gravy Train
- Released: December 1971
- Recorded: Olympic Sound Studios, London, England, 1971
- Genre: Progressive rock, hard rock
- Length: 38:46; 42:45 (bonus track)
- Label: Vertigo (original release); Repertoire (1990 and 2006 German reissues)
- Producer: Jonathan Peel (for Mike Vaughn Productions Ltd.)

Gravy Train chronology
Gravy Train (1970)	(A Ballad of) A Peaceful Man (1971)	Second Birth (1973)

Professional ratings
Review scores
Source	Rating
Allmusic	3.5/5 stars

(A Ballad of) A Peaceful Man is Gravy Train's second — and probably their most praised — album, released in late 1971. Unlike their heavier debut, this album sports some lovely string arrangements, provided by Nick Harrison.

A unique feature of the album is that it splits the heavy tracks from the lighter tracks: all the ballads are on side 1, while all the rockers are on side 2.

== Track listing ==
All tracks are written by Gravy Train.

Side one
No.	Title	Length
1.	"Alone in Georgia"	4:35
2.	"(A Ballad of) A Peaceful Man"	7:06
3.	"Jule's Delight"	6:58

Side two
No.	Title	Length
4.	"Messenger"	5:58
5.	"Can Anybody Hear Me"	2:59
6.	"Old Tin Box"	4:45
7.	"Won't Talk About It"	3:00
8.	"Home Again"	3:25
Total length:		38:46

Bonus track on 2002 & 2006 Repertoire reissues
No.	Title	Length
9.	"Alone in Georgia" (Single Edit)	3:59
Total length:		42:45

== Personnel ==
- Norman Barratt – guitar, vocals
- J.D. Hughes – keyboards, vocals, wind
- Lester Williams – bass, vocals
- Barry Davenport – drums
