= Jekyll & Hyde en Español =

Jekyll and Hyde en Español

Studio album by Petra
- Released: April 20, 2004
- Studio: Bridge St. Studios
- Genre: Christian rock
- Length: 31:09
- Label: Inpop
- Producer: Peter Furler

Petra chronology
| Jekyll & Hyde (2003) | Jekyll and Hyde en Español (2004) | Petra Farewell (2005) |

Jekyll & Hyde en Español is the Spanish version of the album of the same name released by legendary Christian rock band Petra. It was released in 2004 by Inpop Records.

The songs were translated by Alejandro Allen, who had worked translating Petra songs before when he worked in a Mexican production titled Colección Coral Petra II.

== Track listing ==
1. "Jekyll & Hyde" – 3:04
2. "¿Quién es tu conécte alla?" – 2:35
3. "Párate" – 3:19
4. "Lo que pudo ser" – 2:58
5. "Un mundo perfecto" – 3:13
6. "La prueba" – 3:01
7. "Te adoro" – 2:33
8. "Así es nuestra vida" – 3:27
9. "Moldéame" – 3:03
10. "Pacto de amor" – 3:50

== Personnel ==
- John Schlitt – lead vocals
- Bob Hartman – guitars
- Greg Bailey – backing vocals

Guest musicians

- Peter Furler – drums, background vocals, producer
- Pablo Olivares – background vocals
