= Sayin' It with Love =

Studio album by Steve Camp
- Released: 1978
- Studio: Chicago Recording Company (Chicago, Illinois)
- Genre: Contemporary Christian music, Christian rock
- Label: Myrrh
- Producer: Steve Camp

Steve Camp chronology
Sayin' It with Love (1978)	Start Believin' (1980)

Sayin' It with Love is the debut album by Christian singer-songwriter Steve Camp, released in 1978 on Myrrh Records.

== Track listing ==
All songs written by Steve Camp, except where noted.

No.	Title	Writer(s)	Length
1.	"Sayin' It with Love"		2:48
2.	"Me"	Paul Bogush, Jr.	3:22
3.	"If I Were A Singer"	Steve Camp, Larry Norman	2:55
4.	"Gather in His Name"		2:55
5.	"Let Not Your Heart Be Troubled"		4:30
6.	"God Loves You"		1:48
7.	"Good News"	David McDougall	4:12
8.	"Song for Mom"		4:55
9.	"Lord Make Me Humble"		3:39
10.	"Strong Love, Strange Peace with Diamonds"	L. Norman	4:56
11.	"Tell Everybody"		1:57

Note: Never released on CD

== Personnel ==
- Steve Camp – lead vocals, backing vocals, arrangements, BGV arrangements
- Patrick Leonard – acoustic piano, electric piano, organ, Minimoog, Polymoog
- Paul Libman – acoustic piano, string arrangements
- Frank Barbalace – guitars, backing vocals
- Bruce Gaitsch – guitars
- Danny Leek – guitars
- Sid Sims – bass
- Rusty Taylor – bass
- Ron Kapland – drums, percussion
- Tom Ratdke – drums
- Jackie Skalow – drums
- Louis DuChane – percussion, backing vocals, BGV arrangements
- Brenda Mitchell – percussion
- Steve Eisen – alto saxophone
- Sol Bobrov, Elliott Golub, Harold D. Klatz, Roger Moulton, Arnie Roth and Everett Zlatoff-Mirsky – string players
- Josie DeChristopher – backing vocals
- Vickie Hubbley – backing vocals
- Butch Patrini – backing vocals
- Debby Wolgemuth – backing vocals
- Steve Wyer – backing vocals

=== Production ===
- Steve Camp – producer
- Hank Neuberger – engineer
- Alan Kubicka – engineer, mix down engineer
- Gary Elgehammer – backup engineer
- Tom Hansen – backup engineer
- Greg Calbi – mastering at Sterling Sound (New York, NY)
- Paul Bogush Jr. – production assistant
- Martin Donald – design, lettering
- Jim Whitmer – photography
- Steve Wyer – props, hair stylist, wardrobe

== Charts ==
=== Radio singles ===
Year	Singles	Peak positions
Year	Singles	CCM AC
1978	"Gather in His Name"	9
1978	"Sayin' It with Love"	18
