= Only the Very Best =

Greatest hits album by Steve Camp
- Released: 1983
- Recorded: 1983 (one song)
- Genre: Christian music, Rock
- Label: Myrrh
- Producer: Steve Camp, Morris Butch Stewart, Keith Thomas

Steve Camp chronology
For Every Man (1981)	Only the Very Best (1983)	Fire and Ice (1983)

Only the Very Best is the fourth contemporary Christian music album by Steve Camp. This is a compilation of songs from his previous three albums with Myrrh, released as Camp was preparing to move to the Sparrow label. The title song is the only new track recorded for the album.

== Track listing ==
1. "Run to the Battle" - 3:46
2. "Only the Very Best" [new song - exclusive to this release] (Claire Cloninger, Russ Hollingsworth, Keith Thomas) - 3:32
3. "Song for Mom" - 4:55
4. "Under His Love" - 3:35
5. "Bobby" - 5:19
6. "Ambassador in Chains" - 3:51
7. "Jesus Drawing Me" - 4:12
8. "Gather in His Name" - 2:55
9. "Farther and Higher" - 3:16
10. "Strong Love, Strange Peace with Diamonds" - 4:56

Note: Never released on CD

== Personnel ==
- Producers – Keith Thomas (Tracks 1, 2, 7 & 9); Steve Camp (Tracks 3, 5, 8 & 10); Morris Stewart (Tracks 4 & 6).
- Executive Producer – Neal Joseph
- Art Direction – Bill Brunt
- Photography – Alan Messer
