= Fire and Ice (Steve Camp album) =

Studio album by Steve Camp
- Released: 1983
- Recorded: 1983
- Studios: Weddington Studios, (North Hollywood, California)
- Genres: Christian music, rock
- Length: 39:16
- Label: Sparrow
- Producers: Steve Camp; John Rosasco

Steve Camp chronology
Only the Very Best (1983)	Fire and Ice (1983)	It's a Dying World (1984)

Professional ratings
Review scores
Source	Rating
AllMusic	2/5 stars

Fire and Ice is a contemporary Christian music album by Steve Camp that was released by Sparrow Records in late 1983. It was Camp's first studio album since switching from Word earlier that year (though his final Word album, It's a Dying World, had already been recorded and would eventually be released in 1984). CCM Magazine ranked Fire and Ice at number 96 in their 2001 book The 100 Greatest Albums in Christian Music. The album peaked at number 14 on the Billboard Top Inspirational Albums chart.

== Track listing ==
All songs written by Steve Camp, except where noted.

1. "Upon This Rock" (Steve Camp, Rob Frazier) – 3:37
2. "It Is Good" (Camp, Frazier, John Rosasco) – 3:37
3. "Love's Not a Feeling" (duet with Michele Pillar) (Camp, Frazier) – 4:17
4. "Heart of Stone" (Camp, Frazier) – 4:10
5. "Living in Laodicea" – 4:04
6. "Squeeze" (Camp, Frazier) – 4:57
7. "Fire and Ice" (Camp, Frazier) – 2:55
8. "Light Your Candle" – 3:48
9. "What Would the Devil Say?" (Camp, Frazier) – 2:59
10. "Where Are the Heroes" – 4:52

== Personnel ==
- Steve Camp – lead vocals, backing vocals, keyboards
- Smitty Price – keyboards
- John Rosasco – keyboards
- Rhett Lawrence – synthesizer programming
- Dann Huff – guitars
- Marty Walsh – guitars
- Gary Lunn – bass
- John Patitucci – bass
- Keith Edwards – drums
- Joe English – drums, backing vocals
- Alex MacDougal – percussion
- Brandon Fields – saxophone
- Joan Anderson – backing vocals
- Carol Frazier – backing vocals
- Rob Frazier – backing vocals
- Howard McCrary – backing vocals
- Linda McCrary – backing vocals
- Charity McCrary – backing vocals
- Diane Thiel – backing vocals
- Kevin Thiel – backing vocals
- Michele Pillar – lead vocals (3)

Production

- Steve Wyer – executive producer
- Steve Camp – producer, arrangements
- John Rosasco – producer, arrangements
- Wally Grant – engineer
- Greg Butler – assistant engineer
- Mike Ross – assistant engineer
- Brent Maher – additional engineer
- Hank Neuberger – additional engineer
- Steve Hall – mastering at Future Disc (Hollywood, California)
- Stan Evenson – art direction for Stan Evenson Design, Inc.
- B. Charlyne Hinesley – cover coordination
- Marlene Bergmann – design
- John Taylor – design
- Craig Barnes – photography

== Notes ==
- The song, "Light Your Candle", was recorded for with Camp's 1984 album, It's a Dying World, which was recorded before Fire and Ice, but released after. For this album, Camp added the line "Let it burn bright in the face of the devil" in the chorus.

== Charts ==
Chart (1984)	Peak position
US Top Inspirational Albums (Billboard)	14

=== Radio singles ===
Year	Singles	Peak positions
Year	Singles	CCM AC
1984	"Love's Not a Feeling" (with Michele Pillar)	4
1984	"Living in Laodicea"	13
