= Sarah Jahn =

American singer

- Origin: Wood River, Illinois, U.S.
- Genre: Contemporary Christian
- Occupation: Singer
- Label: Warner Alliance

Sarah Jahn is an American Christian pop singer from Wood River, Illinois.

== Biography ==
Jahn sang in a middle school choir, but did not consider a career in music until she switched to a major in Christian music as a student at Greenville College in the early 1990s. In 1994, Jars of Clay, a band composed of Greenville students, won the Gospel Music Association Spotlight New Artist Competition and subsequently signed to Essential Records. Jahn herself won the same Spotlight Competition later that year. She toured Japan and self-released an album in 1995; after sending a demo to KPNT 105.7FM in St. Louis, she received radio airplay and was included on one of the station's compilations of local artists. In 1996, Jahn appeared on a Petra tribute album called Never Say Dinosaur, covering the band's 1979 song "Yahweh Love". Jahn signed with Warner Alliance and released the album Sparkle in 1997. The album was produced by Glenn Rosenstein and includes performance and songwriting contributions from members of Jars of Clay and the group Plumb. Sparkle received mixed reviews; Nashville Scene called it "among the freshest and most moving pop releases of the year" and "one of the finest pop albums to come out of Nashville in 1997", while Allmusic described it as "listenable, but unmemorable." She supported the album with a tour as the opening act for Jars of Clay, and appeared at the Alliance Festival in the United Kingdom. A song from Sparkle, "Drinking Water", was a hit on Christian radio in 1998.

== Discography ==
=== Studio albums ===
Title	Details
Sarah Jahn	Released: 1995; Label: Independent; Formats: CD
Sparkle	Released: 1997 (Japan) • February 10, 1998 (US & Europe); Label: Warner Alliance; Formats: CD, cassette, digital download, streaming

=== Singles ===
Year	Single	Chart	Album
Year	Single	US Christ. Air	Album
1996	"Yahweh Love"	15	Non-album single
1997	"Crucible"	6	Sparkle
1997	"Paradox"	—	Sparkle
1997	"Drinking Water"	5	Sparkle
"—" denotes releases that did not chart or were not released in that territory.
