= Petra Farewell =

2005 live album by Petra

Farewell

Live album by Petra
- Released: 2005
- Genre: Christian rock
- Length: 63:25
- Label: Inpop
- Producer: Petra, Wes Campbell, Peter Furler and Rob Poznanski

Petra chronology
Jekyll & Hyde En Espanol (2004)	Farewell (2005)	Hope (2026)

Professional ratings
Review scores
Source	Rating
Jesus Freak Hideout (audio)	4/5 stars
Jesus Freak Hideout (video)	4.5/5 stars

Farewell

Video by Petra
- Released: March 7, 2006
- Recorded: October 4, 2005 - Franklin, Tennessee
- Genre: Christian rock
- Label: Inpop

Farewell is the second live album released by Christian rock band Petra. It was released in 2005. A DVD of the concert was released in 2006.

This is the band's second live album, and it was recorded during the band's Farewell tour in Franklin, Tennessee on October 4, 2005.

The concert features guest appearances by two former members of the band: singer Greg X. Volz and keyboardist John Lawry.

== Track listing ==
1. "All About Who You Know" – 3:22
2. "Dance" – 4:32
3. "Amazing Grace" – 4:29
4. "Test of Time" – 3:22
5. "Creed" – 3:14
6. "Right Place" – 3:57
7. "Rock Medley" – 10:05
  - "Sight Unseen"
  - "It Is Finished"
  - "Think Twice"
  - "I Am On The Rock"
  - "Midnight Oil"
  - "Mine Field"
  - "This Means War!"
  - "It Is Finished (Reprise)"
8. "Jekyll & Hyde" – 3:48
9. "Acoustic Set" (featuring Greg X. Volz) – 10:04
  - "Rose Coloured Stained Glass Windows" (1)
  - "Road To Zion" (1)
  - "More Power To Ya" (1)
  - "For Annie" (1)
  - "No Doubt" (2)
  - "The Coloring Song" (1)
  - "Love" (2)
10. "Grave Robber" (featuring Greg X. Volz) – 4:20
11. "Keyboard Solo" (featuring John Lawry) – 1:33
12. "Beyond Belief" – 4:30
13. "Guitar Solo" (featuring Bob Hartman) – 1:24
14. "He Came, He Saw, He Conquered" – 4:36

(1): Lead vocals by Greg X. Volz (2): Lead vocals by John Schlitt

== DVD version ==
The DVD version of the concert includes the same track listing as the CD. As for the special features, it includes an interview with John Schlitt, Greg X. Volz and John Lawry. The interview includes clips of another interview with band founder Bob Hartman. There are also fan interviews as they arrive the concert, and an interview to producer Peter Furler.

Another special feature is the band's rehearsal before the concert.

== Missing Material ==
There were three songs that didn't make it into the album or DVD. They were "Judas' Kiss", "Lord I Lift Your Name on High" and "C-H-R-I-S-T-I-A-N". The first two were cut to save space, while the latter wasn't intended to be in the CD. "Just something for fun we threw in" as Hartman said. During one of the takes of Hartman's guitar solo, he broke a string. While he was fixing it, Paul Simmons delivered an impromptu drum solo which was also cut from the album and DVD. Rob Poznanski, general manager of Inpop Records explained its omission by saying "That was really spontaneous, if you remember... We did not get a clean run at it."

The live recordings of "Judas' Kiss" and "Lord, I Lift Your Name on High" eventually appeared on Bob Hartman and John Schlitt's album, performing as II Guys from Petra, Vertical Expressions.

== Personnel ==
=== Petra ===
- John Schlitt - vocals
- Bob Hartman - guitars
- Greg Bailey - bass guitar, cello
- Paul Simmons - drums, percussion

Guest musicians

- Greg X. Volz - vocals
- John Lawry - keyboards

Production

- Petra - producer
- Wes Campbell, Peter Furler and Rob Poznanski - Executive Producers
- Jim Cooper for Lake Dog Music Group LLC - Project Coordinator
