= GHF =

GHF may refer to:

== Organisations ==
- Galveston Historical Foundation, Galveston, Texas, USA
- Gaza Humanitarian Foundation, U.S. nonprofit for Gaza Strip relief
- Ghana Air Force (ICAO code GHF) of the Ghanaian Armed Forces
- Global Harvest Fund, Apostolic Church of Pentecost; a missionary support fund
- Global Heritage Fund, a non-profit
- Global Humanitarian Forum, a non-profit
- God Has Forgiven (GHF), a band founded by Greg Hough
- Grammy Hall of Fame, for music recordings
- Greenland Handball Federation (GHF; Danish: Grønlands Handbold Forbund)

== Other uses ==
- Giebelstadt Airport (IATA airport code GHF), Würzburg, Germany
- glycoside hydrolase family (GHF)
- Gradient Heating Furnace, an experimental apparatus aboard the International Space Station in the Kibō (ISS module) Japanese laboratory

== See also ==
- GHFS
