= Greg X. Volz =

American singer

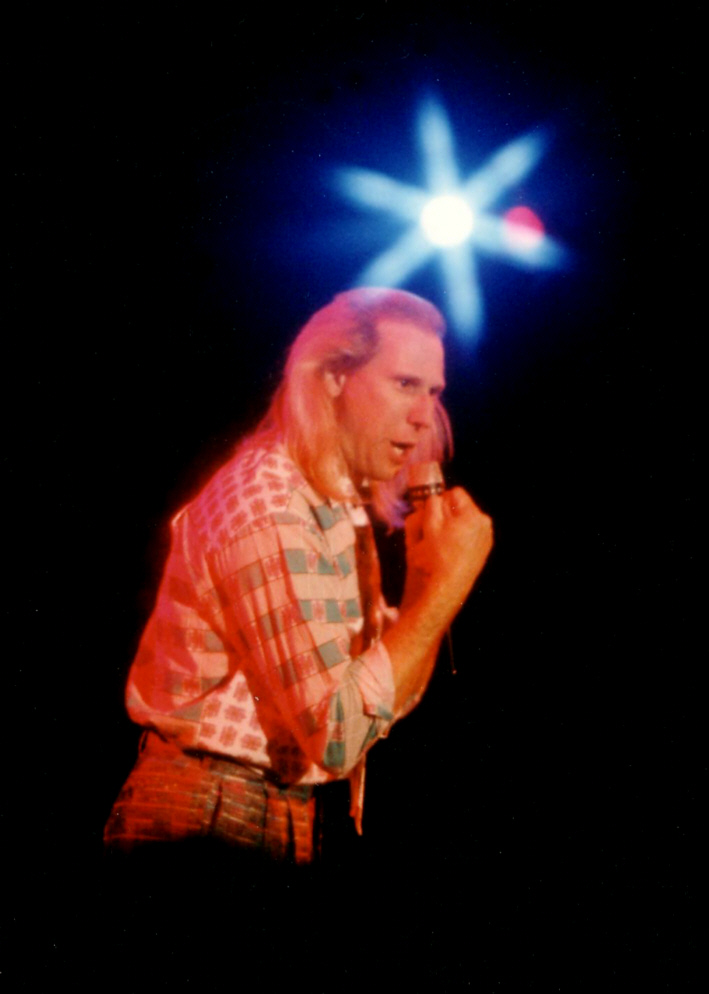
- Volz in 1987

Background information
- Born: Gregory Xavier Volz; January 12, 1950 (age 76)
- Origin: Peoria, Illinois, U.S.
- Genres: Christian rock, contemporary Christian music
- Occupation: Singer
- Years active: 1964–present
- Formerly of: Petra; e Band; Classic Petra; Classic Petra Resurrection
- Website: www.gregxvolz.com

Gregory Xavier Volz (born January 12, 1950) is a Christian rock singer. He is most noted for being the lead singer of Petra from 1979 to 1985. He has continued to sing, sporadically, for different iterations of Petra such as Classic Petra (2010-2012) and Classic Petra Resurrection (CPR; 2016 to the present).

== Biography ==
A self-taught musician by age 13, Volz joined a band with his cousins called The Wombats in 1964. They were formed while all the members were high schoolers in Metamora, Illinois. Volz remained with the Wombats until the band dissolved in 1968. In fall 1968, he formed a band called Gidian's Bible in Indianapolis.

At some point during this pre-Christian music period, he shared stages with Janis Joplin and Chicago among others. In 1970 he became a born-again Christian. Gidian’s Bible fell apart and together with drummer David Eden, Volz formed a new Jesus music band called e Band. The only studio recordings from e can be found on the rock musical two-disc LP Because I Am released in 1973. After they broke up in 1975 Volz moved to Springfield, Missouri, where he worked with guitarist Phil Keaggy. He also performed the lead role in a rock stage musical called Ezekiel. Volz was offered the lead singer position of REO Speedwagon in 1976 but declined due to his Christian faith. Six weeks later he was asked to participate in Petra's second album, Come and Join Us. Although Volz guest sang on only three tunes, Petra's founder/guitarist Bob Hartman was impressed enough to ask Volz to take over the lead vocalist slot. (At that time, Hartman and co-founder/guitarist Greg Hough had been sharing the duties.)

His first full-time album with the band, Washes Whiter Than, came in 1979. Never Say Die (1981), More Power to Ya (1982), and Not of this World (1983) followed. Petra then changed sound slightly with new keyboard player John Lawry on 1984's Beat the System and reached the pinnacle of the Volz era. They played 285 dates to 500,000 people overall on the subsequent tour and resulted in a live album, Captured in Time and Space. At the beginning of 1985 Volz was beginning to feel the strain of the heavy performing schedule over the previous four years and his family life was suffering. Volz gave nine-months notice to his band mates that he would be leaving the band at the conclusion of the tour.

Volz took a year off to regroup, spend time with his family and write the material that would surface on his first solo album, The River is Rising, released in 1986 on Myrrh Records. He followed it with three other moderately successful albums. During this time, he toured with Joe English in a band called Pieces of Eight.

Volz retired for some time in the mid-'90s. During this time he dealt with the divorce from his long-time wife, Becky. He resurfaced in 1998 with a string of new albums released from that year on. On October 4, 2005, he re-joined Petra for the live recording of their last project, Petra Farewell. He joined the stage with current singer, John Schlitt, for a medley of ballads, and he followed it with a solo rendition of "Grave Robber", which was one of his hits with the band.

In May 2010, a reunited version of Petra was formed with its 1984-85 lineup, under the name of Classic Petra. They released an album called Back to the Rock featuring new material and re-recordings of hits from that era.

Volz, along with veteran Petra members, Louie Weaver (drums) and John Lawry (keyboards) formed Classic Petra Resurrection (CPR) in 2016 with former Petra bass player Ronny Cates and former Pieces of Eight guitarist, Kirk Henderson. Back to the Rock II was released in 2017 and similar to its predecessor, features nine re-recorded Petra classics (plus a cover of Aerosmith's "Dream On"). Former Petra bass player Greg Bailey replaced Cates for the live concerts.

== Discography ==
- with Gidians Bible (1970) "Love Is the Answer"/"The Dream" 45 rpm (Golden Voice 834G-2377)
- with e Because I Am (1973) Clear Light Productions CL 2-101 (Two-disc rock musical)
- Cry 3: An Odyssey of the Spirit (1975)
- as Xavier Xavier (1982) no label X111175 (limited private pressing of 1,000 LPs)
- The River Is Rising (1986)
- Come Out Fighting (1988)
- No Room in the Middle (1989)
- The Exodus (1991)
- Greg X. Volz Collection (1992)
- Break Out! Praise (1998)
- Let the Victors In! (1998)
- Ready or Not... Here He Comes! (1999)
- The Next Sphere (2001)
- In God's Presence (2005)
- No Greater Love (2006)
- "O' Holy Night" (special edition) (2007)
- "Dream On"/"What Then" (digital two-track single) (2008)
- "In the Course of Time"/"Standin'" (digital two-track single) (2008)
- In the Course of Time (digital 12-track best-of) (2008)
- "God Only Knows" (digital single) (2008)
- God Only Knows (11-track album) (2009)
- with Classic Petra Back to the Rock (2010)
- with Classic Petra Back to the Rock "Live" (2011) (DVD/Blu-ray)
- with CPR Back to the Rock II (2017)

== See also ==
- Jesus Movement
