= This Means War! =

Studio album by Petra
- Released: 1987
- Genre: Christian rock, hard rock
- Length: 39:56
- Label: StarSong
- Producer: John & Dino Elefante

Petra chronology
Back to the Street (1986)	This Means War! (1987)	On Fire! (1988)

Singles from This Means War!
- 1. "This Means War!" Released: 1987; 2. "I Am Available" Released: 1987; 3. "Get on Your Knees and Fight Like a Man" Released: 1987

Professional ratings
Review scores
Source	Rating
AllMusic	2.5/5 stars

This Means War! is the ninth studio album of the Christian rock band, Petra. It was released in 1987.

In this album, the band started to refine their movement into a more hard rock/arena rock sound, still retaining keyboard synthesizers to back the driving guitar work. This album also signaled the beginning of a military motif present in the song lyrics that the band would carry through several of their following albums.

== Track listing ==
All tracks are written by Bob Hartman, except where noted.

No.	Title	Writer(s)	Length
1.	"This Means War!"		3:30
2.	"He Came, He Saw, He Conquered"	Bob Hartman; John Elefante	4:06
3.	"Get on Your Knees and Fight Like a Man"		4:33
4.	"I Am Available"		4:27
5.	"Kenaniah" (lyrics: Bob Hartman, Danny Kingen, and John Lawry)	Danny Kingen; John Lawry	3:44
6.	"You Are My Rock"	Dino Elefante; John Elefante	4:20
7.	"The Water Is Alive"		3:48
8.	"Don't Let Your Heart Be Hardened"		3:43
9.	"Dead Reckoning"		3:24
10.	"All the King's Horses"		4:16
Total length:			39:56

25th Anniversary Edition
No.	Title	Length
11.	"Bob Hartman's Solo" (Live)	2:26
12.	"John Lawry's Solo - The Race" (Live)	1:52
13.	"Louie Weaver's Solo" (Live)	2:04
Total length:		46:19

== Awards ==
- Nominated for Grammy Award for Best Gospel Performance in 1987.
- Won the Netherlands's Contemporary Christian album of the year in 1988.

== Personnel ==
Petra

- Bob Hartman – lead guitars, additional programming, arrangements
- John Schlitt – lead vocals, background vocals
- John Lawry – keyboards, computer programming, background vocals
- Mark Kelly – bass guitar, background vocals
- Louie Weaver – drums, additional programming

Additional musicians

- John Elefante – additional programming, background vocals, arrangements
- Tim Heintz – additional programming
- Dino Elefante – arrangements
- Tom Hrbacek and Los Alamitos High School Marching Drummers – percussion on "This Means War"

Production

- John Elefante – producer, engineer, mixing at Pakaderm Studio, Los Alamitos, California
- Dino Elefante – producer, engineer, mixing
- Mike Mireau – engineer
- Steve Hall – mastering at Future Disc, Los Angeles
- Dave Rogers – art direction, design
- Chris Hopkins – illustration
