= Washes Whiter Than =

Studio album by Petra
- Released: 1979
- Genre: Christian rock, CCM
- Length: 39:25
- Label: StarSong
- Producer: George Atwell

Petra chronology
Come and Join Us (1977)	Washes Whiter Than (1979)	Never Say Die (1981)

Professional ratings
Review scores
Source	Rating
AllMusic	2/5 stars

Washes Whiter Than is the third studio album by the Christian rock band Petra. It was released in 1979 amidst major line-up changes that saw all but one of the founding band members leave.

The album features a more mellow style when compared to the band's two previous efforts. Part of the reason for this is that the group wanted to get away from the controversy surrounding the hard rock style of their earlier releases. The softer material on this record achieved greater airplay on Christian radio stations than had their previous albums. This is also the first release to feature singer Greg X. Volz as an official band member. Musician Rob Frazier, who later went on to have a solo career, is also featured as lead vocalist in several of the songs, as well as playing most of the instrumentation together with founder Bob Hartman.

The album was reissued by Star Song Records on a 2-on-1 CD package together with 1981's Never Say Die. The songs "(Couldn't Find Love) Without You" and "Magic Words" were cut from this edition to save space.

== Track listing ==
All tracks are written by Bob Hartman, except where noted.

No.	Title	Writer(s)	Length
1.	"I'm Thankful"		4:21
2.	"Why Should the Father Bother?"		3:46
3.	"Morning Star"	Rob Frazier	4:47
4.	"Magic Mirror"		3:27
5.	"Mary's Song"	Rob Frazier	4:00
6.	"Yahweh Love"		5:38
7.	"(Couldn't Find Love) Without You"	Rob Frazier	4:19
8.	"Taste and See"		3:23
9.	"Magic Words"	Rob Frazier	3:27
10.	"Deep Love"		3:57
Total length:			39:25

- Tracks 7 and 9 were excluded from the album's CD release

== Personnel ==
Petra

- Bob Hartman – lead guitar, rhythm guitar, backing vocals, track arrangements
- Greg X. Volz – lead vocals (1, 4, 6, 8), backing vocals
- Rob Frazier – lead vocals (1–3, 5–7, 9–10), backing vocals, keyboards, guitars, track arrangements

Additional musicians

- George Atwell – keyboards, track arrangements, horn and string arrangements, conductor
- Gerald Byron – guitars
- Joel Balin – guitars
- Chip Meyers – bass
- Randy Nichols – drums, percussion
- Bob Prince

Production

- George Atwell – producer
- Dan R. Brock – album direction
- Andy deGanahl – engineer at Bee Jay Recording Studios, Orlando, Florida
- George Werth – album design, artwork
- Allen Zentz – mastering at Allen Zentz Recording, Hollywood, California
