= The Steve Camp Collection =

Compilation album by Steve Camp
- Released: April 4, 1995
- Recorded: 1983–1994
- Genre: Christian music
- Length: 2:23:07
- Label: Sparrow
- Producers: Steve Camp; John Rosasco; Phil Naish; Michael Omartian

Steve Camp chronology
The Best of Steve Camp: My Utmost for His Highest (1995)	The Steve Camp Collection (1995)	Abandoned to God (1999)

Professional ratings
Review scores
Source	Rating
AllMusic	4/5 stars

The Steve Camp Collection is the fifth and final compilation album for Steve Camp, and his first truly exhaustive "best-of" album containing 32 songs on two cassettes or compact discs. This would also be Camp's final major-label release, as his final two releases; 1999's "Abandoned to God" and 2002's "Desiring God" would be released on the small Ministry Music label and self-released respectively.

== Track listing ==
Disc one

1. "Farther and Higher"
2. "Light Your Candle"
3. "It's a Dying World"
4. "Fire and Ice"
5. "Living in Laodicea"
6. "Love's Not a Feeling"
7. "Upon This Rock"
8. "Shake Me to Wake Me"
9. "Lazy Jane"
10. "Stranger to Holiness"
11. "Surrender Your Heart"
12. "He Covers Me"
13. "Threshing Floor"
14. "Foolish Things"
15. "One on One"
16. "Cheap Grace"
17. "He's All You Need"

Disc two

1. "Do Something Now" (with CAUSE; this was from a 1984 charity collaboration)
2. "Whatever You Ask"
3. "Come to the Lord"
4. "After God's Own Heart"
5. "Do You Feel Their Pain"
6. "Living Dangerously in the Hands of God"
7. "Don't Tell Them Jesus Loves Them"
8. "Great American Novel" (originally recorded by Larry Norman)
9. "Run to the Battle"
10. "For Every Time"
11. "Consider the Cost"
12. "Follow Me"
13. "Guard the Trust"
14. "Shade for the Children"
15. "Carry Me"
