= More Power to Ya =

Studio album by Petra
- Released: September 21, 1982
- Recorded: June 1982
- Genre: Christian rock
- Length: 43:17
- Label: Star Song
- Producer: Jonathan David Brown

Petra chronology
Never Say Die (1981)	More Power to Ya (1982)	Not of this World (1983)

Professional ratings
Review scores
Source	Rating
AllMusic	3/5 stars
Jesus Freak Hideout	3.5/5 stars

More Power to Ya is the fifth studio album of the Christian rock band, Petra. It was released in 1982. This was the first album to feature Louie Weaver as the official drummer. It also features the vocals of bassist Mark Kelly in the song "Disciple". The album climbed to number 3 on the Billboard Top Inspirational Albums chart.

== Track listing ==
All tracks are written by Bob Hartman, except where noted.

No.	Title	Writer(s)	Length
1.	"Stand Up"		3:35
2.	"Second Wind"		4:36
3.	"More Power to Ya"		3:39
4.	"Judas' Kiss"		4:44
5.	"Rose Coloured Stained Glass Windows"		4:19
6.	"Run for the Prize"		4:32
7.	"All Over Me"		5:53
8.	"Let Everything that Hath Breath"	Greg X. Volz	4:23
9.	"Road to Zion"	Mike Hudson	4:01
10.	"Disciple"		3:31
Total length:			43:17

30th Anniversary Edition
No.	Title	Length
11.	"Stand Up" (Live)	1:58
12.	"Judas' Kiss" (Live)	2:46
13.	"More Power to Ya" (Live)	2:39
Total length:		50:42

== Backmasking ==
This album included the use of the backmasking technique. According to many people, backmasking was being used in rock music to include hidden satanic messages. This caused a backlash from the Christian community against the genre. In an attempt to divert people obsessed with this from it, Petra used the technique with the intent to send a message. During the song "Judas' Kiss", from 0:00 to 0:03, the phrase "What are you lookin' for the devil for when you oughta be lookin' for the Lord?" is heard when played in backward motion.

== Personnel ==
Petra

- Greg X. Volz – lead vocals
- Bob Hartman – guitars
- John Slick – keyboards, backing vocals, synthesizer programs and arrangements
- Mark Kelly – bass, backing vocals, co-lead vocals on "Disciple"
- Louie Weaver – drums

Production

- Jonathan David Brown – producer, track arrangements, recording at Indian Creek Recording, Uvalde, Texas and Rivendell Recorders, Pasadena, Texas, mixing at Rivendell Recorders
- Brian Tankersley – technical assistance
- Steve Hall – mastering at MCA/Whitney, Glendale, California
- Petra – track arrangements
- T & T Designs – art direction
- Lisa Williams – layout
- Randy Rogers – illustration
- Petragram – sleeve illustration
- Bob Thigpen – sleeve photos

== Charts ==
Chart (1983)	Peak position
US Inspirational Albums (Billboard)	5
