= Beat the System (album) =

Studio album by Petra
- Released: 1984
- Studio: Mama Jo's, North Hollywood
- Genre: Christian rock
- Length: 41:15
- Label: StarSong, A&M
- Producer: Jonathan David Brown

Petra chronology
| Not of this World (1983) | Beat the System (1984) | Captured in Time and Space (1986) |

Professional ratings
Review scores
| Source | Rating |
|---|---|
| AllMusic | 2/5 stars |

Beat the System is the seventh studio album of the Christian rock band Petra. It was released in late 1984. (Note: The album release as indicated on the album and compact disc is 1984, although AllMusic and Encyclopedia of Contemporary Christian Music indicate a 1985 release.)

It is the first album to feature John Lawry on keyboards, though he joined towards the end of the recording process. Lawry's contributions were limited to overdubs on the songs "Beat the System", "Clean" and "Adonai", producer Jonathan David Brown has said. Most of the keyboards on the album, as well as all the bass and drum parts, were performed by session musician Carl Marsh; Petra members Mark Kelly (bass) and Louie Weaver (drums) did not perform on the album. Fairlight programmer Rhett Lawrence added some elements to "Clean" and "Hollow Eyes". Carl Marsh's programming, under the direction of producer Jonathan David Brown, veered the sound of the album more in the synth-rock genre of music. The album was nominated for a Grammy Award for Best Gospel Performance by a Duo or Group in 1986.

== Content ==
The album includes the band's second cover of "God Gave Rock and Roll to You", the first being on 1977's Come and Join Us. While the album credits Argent's Russ Ballard as sole songwriter this version, like the earlier version, contains lyrics not heard in the original Argent version.

Guitarist Bob Hartman stated that the recordings of some songs were left unfinished for the album and subsequently never released.

== Track listing ==
All songs written by Bob Hartman, except where noted.

1. "Beat the System" – 4:22
2. "Computer Brains" – 4:01
3. "Clean" – 3:01
4. "It Is Finished" – 3:52
5. "Voice in the Wind" – 4:30
6. "God Gave Rock and Roll to You" (Words & Music by Russ Ballard) – 3:54
7. "Witch Hunt" – 4:34
8. "Hollow Eyes" – 4:03
9. "Speak to the Sky" – 4:16
10. "Adonai" – 4:42

== Personnel ==
Petra

- Bob Hartman – lead guitars, backing vocals
- Greg X. Volz – lead vocals, vocal arrangements
- John Lawry – keyboards, additional synthesizer programming, synth solo (1, 3, 10), backing vocals
- Mark Kelly – bass guitar, synth bass, backing vocals
- Louie Weaver – drums, percussion

Additional musicians

- Carl Marsh – Fairlight programming (keyboards, bass, drums and other embellishments), arrangements
- Rhett Lawrence – additional Fairlight programming
- Jonathan David Brown – arrangements, vocal arrangements

Production

- Jonathan David Brown – producer, recording at Mama Jo's Recording Studios, North Hollywood, California, additional recording at The Bennett House, Franklin, Tennessee, mixing
- Todd Van Etten – recording assistant
- J.T. Cantwell – recording assistant
- Don Cobb – recording assistant
- Steve Hall – mastering at Future Disc Systems (Hollywood, California).
- Robert Peak Jr. – cover concept, photography
- Lori Cooper – graphic design
- David Hix – electronic photo retouching
