= Captured in Time and Space =

Live album by Petra
- Released: 1986
- Recorded: November 21–23, 1985
- Venue: Civic Auditorium, Knoxville, Tennessee; Memorial Auditorium, Greenville, South Carolina; Township Auditorium, Columbia, South Carolina
- Genre: Christian rock
- Length: 62:55
- Label: StarSong, A&M
- Producer: Jonathan David Brown

Petra chronology
Beat the System (1985)	Captured in Time and Space (1986)	Back to the Street (1986)

Professional ratings
Review scores
Source	Rating
AllMusic	3/5 stars

Captured in Time and Space is the first live album of Christian rock band Petra. The concert was re-released on DVD in 2006.

This was the last Petra album to feature Greg X. Volz as lead vocalist.

== Track listing ==
Vinyl release

All tracks are written by Hartman except where noted.

Side one
No.	Title	Length
1.	"Beat the System"	4:23
2.	"Computer Brains"	3:42
3.	"Clean"	3:02
4.	"Grave Robber"	4:22

Side two
No.	Title	Length
1.	"Speak to the Sky"	4:29
2.	"Hollow Eyes"	4:00
3.	"The Rock Medley" ("Stand Up" (Hartman–2:00), "Not By Sight" (Slick–1:22), "Judas' Kiss" (Hartman–2:55))	6:17

Side three
No.	Title	Length
1.	"Mellow Medley" ("The Coloring Song" (Eden–1:08), "Road to Zion" (Hudson–1:12), "More Power to Ya" (Hartman–2:19))	4:39
2.	"John's Solo" ("Jesus Loves You"/"The Race" (Lawry))	3:42
3.	"Bob's Solo"	2:34
4.	"Louie's Drum Solo" (Weaver)	2:13
5.	"God Gave Rock and Roll to You" (Ballard)	2:01

Side four
No.	Title	Length
1.	"Praise Medley" ("Let Everything That Hath Breath" (Volz), "Without Him We Can Do Nothing" (Volz), "Praise Ye the Lord" (Volz–2:26), "Hallelujah Chorus" (Handel–2:02))	8:23
2.	"Godpleaser"	5:06
3.	"It Is Finished"	4:02

CD release

All tracks are written by Hartman except where noted.

No.	Title	Length
1.	"Beat the System"	4:46
2.	"Computer Brains"	4:01
3.	"Clean"	3:02
4.	"Grave Robber"	4:24
5.	"Speak to the Sky"	4:06
6.	"Hollow Eyes"	4:02
7.	"The Rock Medley" ("Stand Up" (Hartman), "Not By Sight" (Slick), "Judas' Kiss" (Hartman))	5:38
8.	"Mellow Medley" ("The Coloring Song" (Eden), "Road to Zion" (Hudson), "More Power to Ya" (Hartman))	5:02
9.	"John's Solo" ("Jesus Loves You"/"The Race" (Lawry))	3:22
10.	"Bob's Solo"	2:36
11.	"Louie's Drum Solo" (Weaver)	2:38
12.	"God Gave Rock and Roll To You" (Ballard)	1:19
13.	"Praise Medley" ("Let Everything That Hath Breath" (Volz), "Without Him We Can Do Nothing" (Volz), "Praise Ye the Lord" (Volz), "Hallelujah Chorus" (Handel))	7:42
14.	"Godpleaser"	4:50
15.	"It Is Finished"	4:05
Total length:		73:23

== Track information ==
- This is the third Petra album to feature the song "God Gave Rock and Roll to You". The song was written by Russ Ballard and covered by Kiss and twice by Petra.
- The song "Hallelujah Chorus" was originally written by George Frideric Handel. It was originally part of a masterpiece known as Messiah.
- Between "Godpleaser" and "It Is Finished" there was a song cut out of the CD and LP versions that only exists on the cassette version. It was an improvised song known as "The Great I Am". This recorded concert was the only time it was ever performed. The cover of the CD version refers to it, advertising a "bonus song" that isn't actually included.
- The talking in between songs is different on the CD version in a couple of places as compared to the LP version, particularly before the last song where a minute or so has been cut out and several minutes newly added (taken from the cassette version).
- The UK vinyl release omits the talking between "Godpleaser" and "It Is Finished" completely.

== Personnel ==
Petra

- Greg X. Volz – lead vocals, rhythm guitar, percussion
- Bob Hartman – electric, acoustic and synthesized guitars, backing vocals
- John Lawry – keyboards, backing vocals
- Mark Kelly – bass, backing vocals, keyboard bass
- Louie Weaver – acoustic and electronic drums

Production

- Jonathan David Brown – producer
- Tim Norris – special CD editor

Recording

- Recorded by Jonathan David Brown
- Remote recording facilities by Reelsound Recording Co., Austin, Texas
- Assistant engineers & set up crew – Malcolm Harper, Mason Harlow & Gordon Garrison
- Re-recorded at Fireside Studios, Nashville, Tennessee
- Re-mixed at Mama Jo's Recording Studio, North Hollywood, California
- Assisted by Todd Van Etten
- Edited at Rivendell Recorders, Pasadena, Texas with thanks to Chuck Sugar, Bret Hurst & Steve Dady
- Mastered at Future Disc Systems by Steve Hall
- Civic Auditorium, Knoxville, Tennessee – November 21, 1985
- Memorial Auditorium, Greenville, South Carolina – November 22, 1985
- Township Auditorium, Columbia, South Carolina – November 23, 1985
