= Barratt Band =

British band

The Barratt Band was formed in 1980 by Norman Barratt, formerly of Gravy Train and the Alwyn Wall Band, and in its initial stages consisted of Barratt (Guitar, Vocals), Dave Morris (Keyboards), Tim Hatwell (Bass) and Russ Caldwell (Drums). The band recorded their first album Playing in the City in 1981 at Chapel Lane Studios just outside Hereford. The band were one of the first fully professional Christian rock (CR) bands in the United Kingdom, all members having worked as professional musicians in mainstream rock and pop.

The band signed to the fledgling Chapel Lane label that had just been started by Rob Andrews, owner of Chapel Lane Studios. This was a bold attempt to produce CR recordings that matched professional secular standards and also raise Christian rock's profile.

The band toured the album extensively throughout the UK, Europe and Scandinavia on major tours supporting Larry Norman. Barratt Band was featured on Larry Norman's 1981 live Friends on Tour album, along with Alwyn Wall. In their own right they embarked on smaller club tours, the highlight being the 1982 Greenbelt Festival held at Knebworth, where they headlined the closing night.

Larry Tomaso replaced Tim Hatwell on bass in 1982 and the band appeared on numerous tours and albums supporting or backing some of the top CR artists of the day from the US and UK, including Larry Norman, Steve Camp, Phil Keaggy, Jessy Dixon and Sheila Walsh.

The band released a second album in 1984 named Voice with Dave Engel on drums.

The heavy touring and work schedules took their toll resulting in one of the band members collapsing through exhaustion while on tour in Scandinavia towards the end of 1986.

Although the band has never officially split up, it never toured or recorded again.

== Discography ==
- Playing in the City (Chapel Lane CLS8005, 1981, reviews)
- Voice (LP) (Chapel Lane CLS8015, 1983)
