= Michele Pillar =

- Birth name: Michele Diane Pillar
- Born: July 26, 1955 (age 69)
- Origin: Long Beach, California
- Genres: CCM
- Occupation: Singer
- Years active: 1979–present
- Labels: Sparrow
- Website: michelepillar.com

Michele Diane Pillar (born July 26, 1955) is a contemporary Christian music singer, songwriter and occasional actress. Despite recording only a handful of studio albums, her music has made a lasting influence in the genre having earned three Grammy Award nominations.

== Early career ==
Pillar's early credits include singing classic songs for the Maranatha! Music Praise Albums II, III, IV and V with solos such as, "Jesus What A Wonder You Are", "In Moments Like These" and "Thou Art Worthy". Pillar's album Reign on Me and her project with Erick Nelson, The Misfit, are now considered classics of the CCM genre. The Misfit has recently been re-issued on compact disc. Her radio hit single with Phil Keaggy, "What a Wonder" brought her to the attention of Christian label executive Billy Ray Hearn and a recording contract with Sparrow Records. Her three solo records for Sparrow in the 1980s all together totaled over 2 million in record sales, before taking a hiatus from solo work in 1984. Pillar also charted with her CD, Love Makes All the Difference for the Benson Company.

Outside of her solo work, she teamed up with Steve Camp on the song "Love's Not a Feeling" (from Camp's 1983 album, Fire and Ice). She also appeared with Camp on the charity single "Do Something Now" in 1985, and also served as the background vocalist for Camp's 1987 album, After God's Own Heart. Then in 1988 her career came to a standstill when her husband, jazz guitarist Larry Carlton, whom she had married just a few months before, was nearly killed in a random shooting in the doorway of their Los Angeles house.

Her 1991 studio album Love Makes All the Difference was her return to recording as a solo artist after working on her husband's music and a variety of other projects. After that successful comeback, Pillar recorded again in 2007 with the Christmas album, I Hear Angels Calling, released through 335 Records. The title track, by Pillar, Nathan East and Jeff Babko, is a spin on Nashville's No. 1 AC Pop station, Mix 92.9 during the Holidays.

Pillar also studied acting and was represented by the William Morris Agency. Pillar was featured in commercials for Lexus, Levi Strauss, and others. She toured with The Billy Graham Association singing for massive crusades and toured up to two hundred concert dates a year. Pillar's voice was featured on The Simpsons on a number of occasions imitating the voice of Karen Carpenter and others.

== Today ==
Pillar has morphed into a speaker, writer and songwriter and tours nationally.

== Charities ==
Closer to Home is a Charity started by Pillar and Aubrey Preston in late 2000 that benefits residents of Williamson County, Tennessee. Fund-raising shows have been headlined by Vince Gill, Jo Dee Messina, Steve Winwood, Michael McDonald, Wynonna, Ricky Skaggs, and Phil Vassar. These shows have included a variety of other artists and songwriters from many styles of music.

== Discography ==
- The Maranatha! Music Praise Albums II, III, IV and V
- The Misfit (with Erick Nelson) (1979)
- Michele Pillar (1982)
- Reign on Me (1983)
- Look Who Loves You Now (1984)
- Love Makes All the Difference (1991)
- I Hear Angels Calling (2006)
- Forever Young (2014) (contains previously released material her 1982, 1983, 1984 and 1991 recordings)
- You Untangle Me (2017)

== Publications ==
- Untangled: The Truth Will Set You Free (2016 BroadStreet Publishing)
