= Not of This World (Petra album) =

Not of this World

Studio album by Petra
- Released: 1983
- Recorded: August 1983
- Genre: Christian rock
- Length: 41:55
- Labels: StarSong, A&M
- Producer: Jonathan David Brown

Petra chronology
More Power to Ya (1982)	Not of this World (1983)	Beat the System (1985)

Professional ratings
Review scores
Source	Rating
AllMusic	3/5 stars

Not of this World is the sixth studio album of the Christian rock band, Petra. It was released in 1983. It is very similar to its predecessor (More Power to Ya), and Bob Hartman has stated that he considers it to be the musical equivalent of a sequel. This album includes some of the group's most popular recordings from the 1980s.

The use of keyboards is featured prominently in this album compared to its predecessor, but not nearly to the level as featured on Beat the System.

== Track listing ==
All songs written by Bob Hartman, except where noted.

1. "Visions (Doxology)" – 2:04 (traditional, arr John Slick)
2. "Not of this World" – 4:49
3. "Bema Seat" – 3:54
4. "Grave Robber" – 4:18
5. "Blinded Eyes" – 5:33
6. "Not by Sight" – 3:20 (John Slick)
7. "Lift Him Up" – 3:26
8. "Pied Piper" – 4:00
9. "Occupy" – 3:28 (John Slick)
10. "Godpleaser" – 4:35
11. "Visions (reprise) (Doxology)" – 2:28 (traditional, arr John Slick)

== Awards ==
- Nominated for the 1985 Grammy Award for Best Gospel Vocal Performance by a Duo or Group, Choir or Chorus.

== Personnel ==
Petra

- Greg X. Volz – lead vocals, rhythm guitar, percussion
- Bob Hartman – lead guitar, acoustic guitar, backing vocals
- John Slick – keyboards, backing vocals
- Mark Kelly – bass, backing vocals
- Louie Weaver – drums, backing vocals

Production

- Jonathan David Brown – producer, recording at Rivendell Recorders, Pasadena, Texas, mixing at Rivendell Recorders
- Dave Rogers – assistant engineer
- Doug Sarrett – assistant engineer
- Steve Hall – mastering at Future Disc Systems, Hollywood, California
- Joan Tankersley – art direction
- Randy Rogers – illustration
- Lori Cooper – layout
- Mark Tucker – sleeve photography
- Vocals recorded at Gold Mine Studios, Nashville, Tennessee
