= Never Say Die (Petra album) =

Studio album by Petra
- Released: 1981
- Studio: Rivendell Sound Recorders, Pasadena, Texas; Martinsound, Alhambra, California; Whitefield Sound, Santa Ana, California
- Genre: Christian rock
- Length: 39:12
- Label: Star Song
- Producer: Jonathan David Brown

Petra chronology
Washes Whiter Than (1979)	Never Say Die (1981)	More Power to Ya (1982)

Professional ratings
Review scores
Source	Rating
AllMusic	2/5 stars

Never Say Die is the fourth studio album of the Christian rock band, Petra. It was released in 1981. "The Coloring Song" was a radio hit for the band and sales were higher for this album than the previous. This album set the stage for Petra's success in the 1980s and their next few albums duplicated much of the formula, as well as repeated the "guitar" theme on the album cover.

The album is the first to exclusively feature Greg X. Volz on vocals, and new members John Slick and Mark Kelly (keyboards and bass guitar respectively).

StarSong Records later re-issued the album on a single CD with 1979's Washes Whiter Than. The former had two tracks cut for space; this album was included in full.

Never Say Die is their first charted album on the Billboard Top Inspirational Albums chart peaking at number 16.

== Track listing ==
All tracks are written by Bob Hartman, except where noted.

No.	Title	Writer(s)	Length
1.	"The Coloring Song"	Dave Eden	2:55
2.	"Chameleon"		5:49
3.	"Angel of Light"		4:21
4.	"Killing My Old Man"		3:48
5.	"Without Him We Can Do Nothing"	Greg X. Volz	3:29
6.	"Never Say Die"		3:43
7.	"I Can Be Friends With You"		4:13
8.	"For Annie"		4:26
9.	"Father of Lights"		3:03
10.	"Praise Ye the Lord"	Greg X. Volz	3:20
Total length:			39:12

== Personnel ==
Petra

- Bob Hartman – guitars
- Greg X. Volz – lead and backing vocals
- John Slick – keyboards, backing vocals, horn and string arrangements on "For Annie"
- Mark Kelly – bass, backing vocals

Additional musicians

- Keith Edwards – drums, percussion
- Alex MacDougall – percussion
- Joe Miller – trombone
- Bob Welborn – trumpet

Production

- Jonathan David Brown – producer, track arrangements, engineer at Rivendell Sound Recorders, Pasadena, Texas, mixing
- Petra – track arrangements
- Steve Hall – mastering at MCA/Whitney Recording Studio, Glendale, California
- Randy Rogers – illustration
- Mary Ann Smith – layout
- Diane McLaughlin – sleeve photography
- Martinsound, Alhambra, California – additional overdubs
- Whitefield Sound, Santa Ana, California – mixing and additional overdubs

== Charts ==
Chart (1982)	Peak position
US Inspirational Albums (Billboard)	16
