= Greg Hough =

American musician

Greg Hough is a Christian musician. He is the founder of Christian rock band Petra.

== Career ==
In 1972, Hough co-founded the Christian rock band Petra alongside Bob Hartman. Throughout the 1970s, the duo served as the group's primary songwriters and shared lead vocal duties.

Hough left Petra in 1979. He continued to play Christian music with the bands Ransom and Ju'so. He also worked with the alternative-country trio Andrews, Hough, and Dan.

In 2003, Hough returned to rock music when he joined the former Petra founding member and drummer, Bill Glover in a project called GHD. After releasing one album, another former Petra founding member, John DeGroff, joined the project and the band changed its name to GHF (God Has Forgiven).

In 2004, Hough and DeGroff rejoined Hartman on stage in a reunion of the original Petra line-up held in Angola, Indiana.

Outside music, Hough has been a practitioner of chiropractic in Fort Wayne, Indiana, since May 1989.
