= Steve Camp =

American music artist and pastor (1955–2026)

Background information
- Born: April 13, 1955; Wheaton, Illinois, U.S.
- Died: November 11, 2026 (aged 71)
- Genre: Contemporary Christian music
- Occupation: Singer
- Instruments: Vocals, guitar, piano
- Years active: 1978–2026
- Labels: Myrrh, Sparrow, Warner Alliance, Ministry, Audience One

Steven J. Camp (April 13, 1955 – November 11, 2026) was an American contemporary Christian music artist and pastor.

== Background ==
Born in Wheaton, Illinois, on April 13, 1955, Camp was raised by Christian parents, and by the age of five, he had confessed faith in Jesus. He went on to desire to serve God through his teenage years. As a young Christian, he created a close bond with Christian singer-songwriter Larry Norman, who gave him advice concerning Camp's own singing and songwriting. In addition, he met Keith Green, who encouraged him to make a stronger commitment to Jesus and the ministry of music. Camp was divorced from his first wife prior to 2002. He remarried on June 19, 2009. He was unrelated to Jeremy Camp, a fellow Christian rock musician. Camp was the senior pastor of Crosslife Church in Fort Pierce, Florida.

In the tradition of Martin Luther's Ninety-five Theses, Camp sent out his own 107 theses on Reformation Day in 1998, calling for a reformation in contemporary Christian music and encouraged contemporary Christian music artists to make direct, uncompromising music that confronted the world with the message of the scriptures.

Camp died from heart failure on November 11, 2026, at the age of 71.

== Career ==
Camp attended Roosevelt University, where he majored in musical composition and theory. He studied under Ralph Dodds. He also studied business law/music at the College of DuPage. In the late 1970s, he began a longtime relationship with Rob Frazier, a one-time Petra member, who co-wrote songs for Camp's own albums. Camp and Frazier reunited on Frazier's 1992 compilation Retrospect, on which Frazier and Camp performed duet vocals for the song "Why, Why Why?". He had a long-term friendship with Scott Wesley Brown, and he played acoustic guitar and sung backups on Brown's 1977 album, I'm Not Religious, I Just Love The Lord, one year before Camp started his solo career. Five of Camp's albums Sayin' It with Love (1978), Start Believin' (1980), For Every Man (1981), Only the Very Best (1983), and It's a Dying World (1984) have never been released on CD.

=== Music ===
Prior to becoming a conference speaker and lecturer, Camp was known as a contemporary Christian music singer-songwriter. In 1977, he signed a recording contract with Myrrh Records, releasing several songs as a solo artist. In 1983, Camp signed a contract with Sparrow Records, with whom he released nine successful albums. On his first album, Fire and Ice, Camp collaborated with Michele Pillar to sing "Love's Not a Feeling". In 1989, Camp released his tenth studio album, Justice, on which he recorded a duet with BeBe Winans, titled "Do You Feel Their Pain?". After Camp's contract with Sparrow ended in 1992, he signed with Warner Alliance, with whom he released two albums. On his 1993 album Taking Heaven By Storm, Camp collaborated with veteran keyboardist and songwriter Michael Omartian, and together they produced a series of number one hits in 1994, including a contemporary remake of "The Lord's Prayer". Later that same year, he released a worship-themed project titled Mercy in the Wilderness.

=== Appearances ===
Along with other popular contemporary Christian artists of the 1980s, Camp made several front covers of CCM Magazine, World Magazine, and Christianity Today, among others. At the same time, he also wrote several articles for leading Christian publications, in addition to giving numerous interviews on Christian radio. After recording several albums, Camp began attending Christian conferences and making frequent guest appearances at Christian colleges. In 1996, he was an honorable invitee at the Alliance of Confessing Evangelicals Conference, where the Cambridge Document was drafted. In 1997, he appeared at the Summit on Church Music Ministry held at Cedarville College in Ohio, contending for sound Biblical theology in Christian music.

In late 1998, Camp was in Celina, Ohio, at a benefit for Harbor House Maternity Home, a Christian home for pregnant teens. 440 people were present to see Camp's perform four songs, including Keith Green's "Asleep in the Light" and Camp's own "He's All You Need." Following his first set of songs, Camp had with an even more passionate exhortation, possibly causing some in attendance to be a bit uncomfortable with Camp's straightforward approach to his messages, saying that they had to do everything possible to save the unborn and to be proactively against abortion.

=== Radio shows and writing ===
In the mid-1990s, Camp was a frequent guest on radio stations all across the country. Between 1995 and 1997, he also hosted his own radio talk show, No Compromise with Steve Camp. He also made guest appearances on The Bible Answer Man with Hank Hanegraaff, The Janet Parshall Show, The Dick Staub Show, Prime Time America with Jim Warren, Iron Sharpens Iron, and several others. He was also a writer for the AudienceONE Ministries website.

== Discography ==
- Sayin' It with Love (1978, Myrrh)
- Start Believin' (1980, Myrrh)
- For Every Man (1981, Myrrh)
- Only the Very Best (1983, Myrrh) (compilation album)
- Fire and Ice (1983, Sparrow)
- It's a Dying World (1984, Myrrh)
- Shake Me to Wake Me (1985, Sparrow)
- One on One (1986, Sparrow)
- After God's Own Heart (1987, Sparrow)
- Compact Favorites (1988, Sparrow) (compilation album)
- Justice (1988, Sparrow)
- Doing My Best (1990, Sparrow) (compilation album)
- Consider the Cost (1991, Sparrow)
- Doing My Best: Volume 2 (1991, Sparrow) (compilation album)
- Taking Heaven By Storm (1993, Warner Alliance)
- Mercy in the Wilderness (1994, Warner Alliance)
- Best of Steve Camp: My Utmost for His Highest (1995, Sparrow) (compilation album)
- The Steve Camp Collection (1995, Sparrow) (compilation album)
- Abandoned to God (1999, Ministry Music/Diamante)
- Desiring God (2002, Audience One/Diamante)
- The Definitive Collection (2007, Word) (compilation album)
- Neighbors in an Age of Rage (2024, Steve Camp Music LLC)
