= John Lawry =

- Born: June 15, 1950 (age 76); Japan
- Origin: Millington, Michigan, U.S.
- Genre: Christian rock

John Lawry (born June 15, 1950) is a Christian rock musician, composer, producer, and songwriter. He was the keyboardist of Petra from 1984 to 1994. After his departure, Lawry dedicated himself to producing and record engineering. From 2010 to 2012, he rejoined some of his former Petra bandmates to record and tour under the name of Classic Petra. In 2013, he officially rejoined Petra as their keyboardist.

== Biography ==
According to his personal testimony as recorded on Petra's Captured In Time and Space live album, John was born in Japan but abandoned on the street. After being taken by missionaries to a mission home, he was subsequently adopted by an American family from Michigan. Lawry grew up in Millington, Michigan.

Lawry showed musical skills from an early age. When he was nine, he learned to play the accordion. When he grew up he went to Millington High School and was involved in the school band, where he played a variety of instruments. Lawry graduated in 1969 and continued working in music. Lawry contributed to several projects during the following years.

In 1982, he joined the Joe English Band and recorded three albums with them. He also recorded with the band's side project: Forerunner. Lawry met Petra founder and guitarist Bob Hartman during his time with the Joe English Band. After the departure of Petra keyboardist, John Slick, Lawry was asked to fill in for some shows, and eventually was asked to join the band. In 1984 he joined Petra recording a total of nine albums with the band. During this period, the band won three Grammys and several other awards.

In 1986, Lawry played a keyboard solo on Greg X. Volz (former Petra lead singer) first solo effort. In 1990, he released Media Alert as a solo album.

Lawry left Petra in 1994 to dedicate to a career producing and recording. He was replaced by his keyboard technician, Jim Cooper. He also released a second solo album, Excursions, in 1997.

In 2005, Lawry joined the stage again with Petra during one of the band's final presentations that were released as the Petra Farewell CD and DVD.

Lawry, along with the "classic" 1980s Petra lineup (John Lawry, Greg X. Volz, Bob Hartman, Mark Kelly, and Louie Weaver) reunited in 2010 under the name of Classic Petra. They recorded an album with two new songs and new versions of classic songs by the name of Back to the Rock. The album, which Lawry produced, was the first studio album by this line-up since 1985's Beat the System. They toured in the later part of 2010 and into 2011.

In 2016 and into 2017, Volz collaborated with Lawry in his home to produce a new album for the renamed version of Classic Petra, now named Classic Petra Resurrection (CPR). The album, Back to the Rock II, was released in October 2017.
