= Rob Frazier =

American songwriter

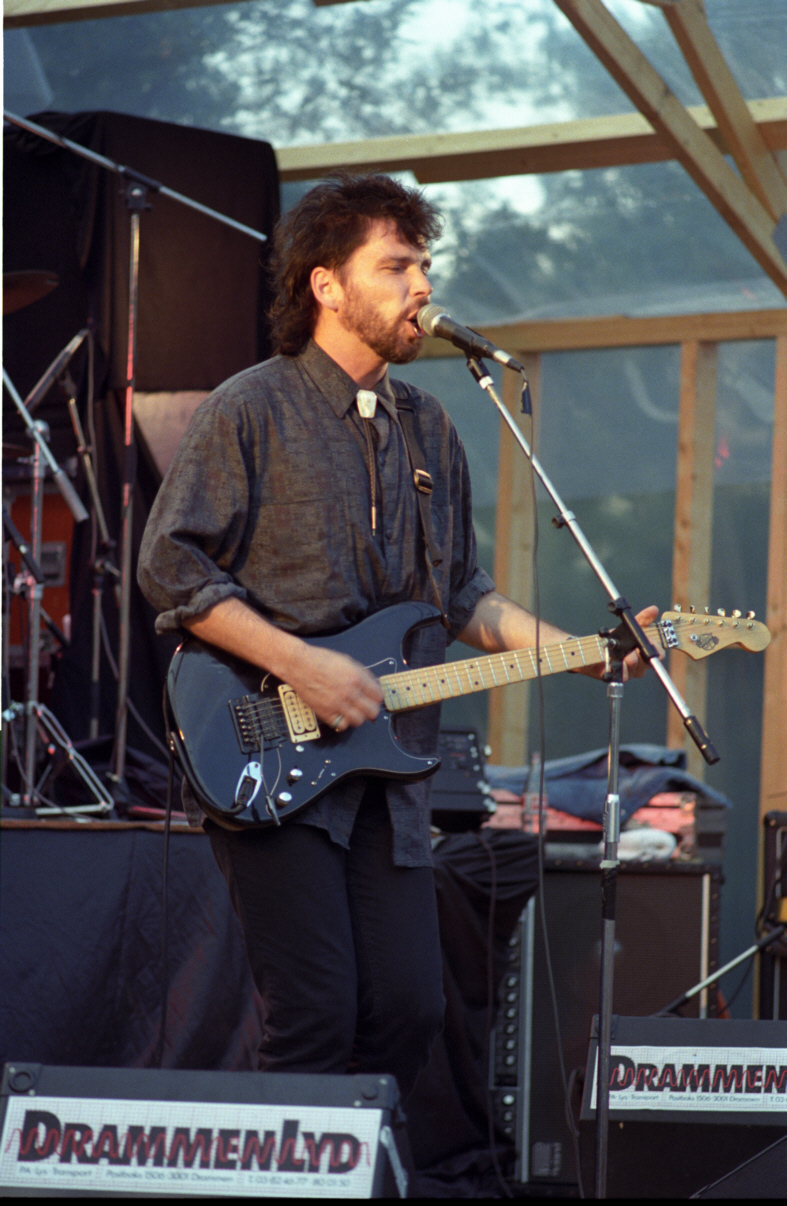

Background information
- Born: October 31, 1953 (age 72)
- Origin: Lincoln, Illinois, U.S.
- Genres: Contemporary Christian music
- Occupation: Singer
- Website: robfrazier.net

Rob Frazier (born October 31, 1953) is an American contemporary Christian music artist, musician, songwriter, record producer, and speaker. He is the son of a pastor, W. Burwell Frazier, founder of Warrington Fellowship Church. He grew up in Warminster north of Philadelphia and graduated from King's College in Manhattan, New York majoring in English literature. He earned an M.Div. from Regent University in Virginia Beach, Virginia.

He has collaborated with numerous artists in and out of the contemporary Christian music scene, including co-writing the 1982 Kansas hit "Play the Game Tonight". In 1978, he joined the Christian rock group Petra, where he played the keyboards and guitar while trading lead vocal duties with Greg X. Volz on the album Washes Whiter Than.

Then, Frazier embarked on a solo career releasing several albums, as well as frequently collaborating with Steve Camp. He wrote and performed numerous top 10 Christian songs including "Cut it Away", "Train Up a Child", "He Is All You Need" (later recorded by co-writer Camp), "(Doesn't Anybody Pray in) This Town", "Break My Heart", "Got Your Word On It", "Go Through Fire", "Love is Sacrifice", "Sins of Billions", "We Are One", "Forgiven," and "Watching Over Me." Frazier also co-wrote songs for Margaret Becker, Camp, Steven Curtis Chapman, Rick Cua, Kenny Marks, Geoff Moore, Petra, Ricky Skaggs, and Dick Tunney.

As a songwriter, Frazier has been nominated for a Grammy Award and two Dove Awards. He has had songs placed in feature films and in shows on network and cable TV; including the hit Netflix series Orange Is the New Black, Counterpart on Starz, and the CBS show "FBI. He was the pastor at Belmont Church in Nashville from 2000 to 2012. He has written jingles for Ace Hardware, Glade Air Fresheners, Circle K Markets, Chrysler-Plymouth, Tex Mart, Texas Chevy Dealers, Tony Roma Ribs, and other companies.

== Solo discography ==
- Cut It Away (1984)
- This Town (1986)
- Heartland (1990)
- Retrospect (1992)
- The Long Run (1993)
- The Things I Say (1997)
- Rob Frazier's Blues Farmers - Jammin' The Blues (1999)
