= Carman discography =

- Studio albums: 18
- Live albums: 4
- Compilation albums: 6
- Singles: 37
- Video albums: 11
- Music videos: 33

This is a discography for the contemporary Christian music artist Carman.

== Discography ==
=== Studio albums ===
Title	Album details	Peak chart positions		Certifications (sales thresholds)
Title	Album details	US	US Christ	Certifications (sales thresholds)
God's Not Finished with Me	Released: 1980; Label: Klesis	–	–	
Some-o-Dat	Released: February 5, 1982; Label: Priority	–	–	
Comin' On Strong	Released: November 6, 1984; Label: Myrrh	–	6	
The Champion	Released: 1985; Label: Myrrh	–	3	RIAA: Gold
A Long Time Ago...In a Land Called Bethlehem	Released: 1986; Label: Power Discs	–	16	
Revival in the Land	Released: October 12, 1989; Label: Benson	–	1	RIAA: Gold
Addicted to Jesus	Released: October 29, 1991; Label: Benson	–	1	RIAA: Gold
Yo Kidz!	Released: 1992; Label: Everland	–	11	
The Standard	Released: September 13, 1993; Label: Sparrow	–	1	RIAA: Platinum
Yo Kidz! 2: The Armor of God	Released: 1994; Label: Everland	–	16	
R.I.O.T. (Righteous Invasion of Truth)	Released: October 31, 1995; Label: Sparrow	45	1	RIAA: Gold
I Surrender All: 30 Classic Hymns	Released: 1997; Label: Sparrow	102	1	RIAA: Gold
Mission 3:16	Released: January 27, 1998; Label: Sparrow	94	2	
Passion for Praise, Vol. 1	Released: 1999; Label: Sparrow	179	8	
House of Praise	Released: September 9, 2003; Label: Corban	–	–	
Instrument of Praise	Released: 2007; Label: Tyscot	–	38	
No Plan B	Released: May 27, 2014; Label: Norway Avenue	66	3	
Legacy	Released: October 6, 2017; Label: Norway Avenue	–	–	

=== Live albums ===
Title	Album details	Peak chart positions	Certifications (sales thresholds)
Title	Album details	US Christ	Certifications (sales thresholds)
Sunday's on the Way	Released: July 1, 1983; Label: Priority	13	
Live... Radically Saved	Released: May 10, 1988; Label: Benson	2	RIAA: Gold
Shakin' the House...Live (with Commissioned and the Christ Church Choir)	Released: April 22, 1991; Label: Benson	4	
Live and Reloaded	Released: 2005; Label: Alliant	–	

=== Compilation albums ===
Title	Album details	Peak chart positions		Certifications (sales thresholds)
Title	Album details	US	US Christ	Certifications (sales thresholds)
The Absolute Best	Released: February 24, 1993; Label: Sparrow	–	4	RIAA: Platinum
Lo Mejor	Released: 1995; Label: Sparrow	–	–	
Carman's Yo Kidz -The Hitz	Released: 1996; Label: Everland	–	–	
Heart of a Champion	Released: 2000; Label: Sparrow	53	1	RIAA: Gold
The Ultimate Collection	Released: 2007; Label: Sparrow	–	–	
Anthems of a Champion	Released: 2013; Label: Sparrow	–	–	

=== Singles ===
Year	Title	Peak chart positions		Album
Year	Title	US Christ CHR	US Christ AC	Album
1984	"Sunday's on the Way"	5	39	Sunday's on the Way
1985	"Lazarus Come Forth"	13	13	Comin' On Strong
1985	"His Mercy Endures Forever"	–	36	Comin' On Strong
1985	"Blessed Is He Who Comes"	–	20	Comin' On Strong
1986	"The Champion"	1	28	The Champion
1986	"Revive Us, Oh Lord"	10	2	The Champion
1986	"Abundance of Rain"	14	–	The Champion
1986	"Fear Not My Child" (with Kim Boyce)	–	24	The Champion
1986	"Jesus Is"	8	–	A Long Time Ago...In a Land Called Bethlehem
1988	"Radically Saved"	1	15	Live... Radically Saved
1988	"Lord of All"	2	17	Live... Radically Saved
1988	"No Way, We Are Not Ashamed"	15	15	Live... Radically Saved
1989	"Jesus Is The Light"	3	33	Revival in the Land
1990	"Shine Through Me"	–	18	Revival in the Land
1990	"Saved, Delivered and Healed"	–	37	Revival in the Land
1991	"The Same God" (with Commissioned and the Christ Church Choir)	8	5	Shakin' the House...Live
1991	"Celebrate Jesus" (with Commissioned and the Christ Church Choir)	–	31	Shakin' the House...Live
1991	"Satan, Bite the Dust"	14	16	Addicted to Jesus
1992	"Jesus Is The Way"	–	11	Addicted to Jesus
1992	"Addicted to Jesus" (with DC Talk)	16	–	Addicted to Jesus
1992	"1955"	–	23	Addicted to Jesus
1992	"Come Into This House" (with Commissioned)	18	–	Addicted to Jesus
1992	"Somewhere Within the Heart" (with Cindy Morgan)	–	1	Yo Kidz!
1993	"Serve the Lord"	–	5	The Absolute Best
1993	"Who's In the House"	23	–	The Standard
1993	"The River"	–	6	The Standard
1994	"America Again"	–	28	The Standard
1994	"Lord, I Love You"	–	37	The Standard
1994	"Great God"	20	–	The Standard
1994	"Meant For This Moment" (with Helen Baylor)	–	24	Yo Kidz! 2: The Armor of God
1996	"Step of Faith"	–	32	R.I.O.T. (Righteous Invasion of Truth)
1997	"Mission 3:16"	–	–	Mission 3:16
1998	"Never Be"	–	–	Mission 3:16
2001	"Faith Enough"	–	–	Heart of a Champion
2013	"The Flag"	–	–	Anthems of a Champion
2014	"Jesus Heal Me"	–	–	No Plan B
2014	"Yes Yes"	–	–	No Plan B
2018	"President Trump Blues"	–	–	Legacy

=== Other collaborations ===
Year	Song	Album	Artist(s)
1986	"His Name is Life"	I Give You Jesus	Janet Paschal
1993	"Glory to God in the Highest"	The New Young Messiah	Various artists
1995	"For Unto You"	Christmas Carols of The Young Messiah	Various artists
1997	"Love One Another" (with various guest artists)	Love and Mercy	Kathy Troccoli
1998	"God Will Take Care of Me"	The Prince of Egypt [Inspirational]	Various artists
1998	"Oh, Happy Day"	Vestal & Friends	Vestal Goodman

== Videography ==
=== Music videos ===
==== Long form ====
Year	Title	Certifications
1985	Comin' On Strong: Live in Concert	
1988	Live... Radically Saved	RIAA: Gold
1990	Revival in the Land	RIAA: Platinum
1992	Addicted to Jesus	RIAA: Gold
1993	The Standard	RIAA: Platinum
1994	Carman's Yo Kidz! The Vidz	RIAA: Gold
1995	Raising The Standard Tour: Live	RIAA: Gold
1998	Absolute Best Videos	
1998	Mission 3:16: The Video	
2001	Carman in Concert: One Night Only	
2003	Carman: House of Praise – Live	

==== Short form ====
- "A Little Bit More Conviction" from The Champion
- "I Got the Joy" (featuring Carlton Pearson) from Revival in the Land
- "A Witch's Invitation" from Revival in the Land
- "The Resurrection Rap" from Revival in the Land
- "Revival in the Land" from Revival in the Land
- "Our Turn Now" (featuring Petra) from Addicted to Jesus
- "Satan, Bite the Dust" from Addicted to Jesus
- "1955" from Addicted to Jesus
- "Addicted to Jesus" (featuring dc Talk) from Addicted to Jesus
- "Who's in the House" from The Standard
- "Great God" from The Standard
- "Sunday School Rock" from The Standard
- "Holdin' On" (featuring Margaret Becker) from The Standard
- "America Again" from The Standard
- "Serve the Lord" (featuring David Foster on piano) from The Absolute Best
- "Meant for This Moment" (featuring Helen Baylor) from Yo Kidz! 2: The Armor of God
- "God Is Exalted" from R.I.O.T. (Righteous Invasion of Truth)
- "R.I.O.T. (Righteous Invasion of Truth)" from R.I.O.T. (Righteous Invasion of Truth)
- "My Story" from R.I.O.T. (Righteous Invasion of Truth)
- "No Monsters" from R.I.O.T. (Righteous Invasion of Truth)
- "7 Ways 2 Praise" from R.I.O.T. (Righteous Invasion of Truth)
- "Step of Faith" (featuring Ricky Skaggs) from R.I.O.T. (Righteous Invasion of Truth)
- "There Is a God" from R.I.O.T. (Righteous Invasion of Truth)
- "Amen" from R.I.O.T. (Righteous Invasion of Truth)
- "Mission 3:16" from Mission 3:16
- "Jesus Is the Lamb" from Mission 3:16
- "The Courtroom" from Mission 3:16
- "We Are Not Ashamed" from Mission 3:16
- "The Prayer Anthem" from Mission 3:16
- "Slam" from Mission 3:16
- "Faith Enough" from Heart of a Champion
- "The Flag" from Anthems of a Champion
- "President Trump Blues" from Legacy

== Filmography ==
=== Movies and television ===
- 1989: Carman: Celebrate Jesus TBN Special
- 1992: Commander Kellie and the Superkids: The Intruder as young singer named Mario
- 1992–97: Time 2 – variety series on TBN
- 1996: R.I.O.T.: The Movie as Victor Rizzo
- 1997: Carman's Classic Hymns Special TBN Special
- 1998: Carman Halloween 3:16 TBN Special
- 2001: Carman: The Champion as Orlando Leone
- 2003: Bobby Jones Gospel; one episode
- 2007: Carman's Reality Check – variety series on TBN (also writer and producer)
- 2009: The Book of Ruth: Journey of Faith as Boaz
- 2010: Changing Hands as Frankie
- 2013: Final: The Rapture as Frankie
