= 17th GMA Dove Awards =

1986 US music awards ceremony

- Date: 1986
- Location: Nashville, Tennessee

The 17th Annual GMA Dove Awards were held on 1986 recognizing accomplishments of musicians for the year 1985. The show was held in Nashville, Tennessee.

== Award recipients ==
- Song of the Year
  - "Via Dolorosa"; Billy Sprague, Niles Borop; Meadowgreen Music, Word Music (ASCAP)
- Songwriter of the Year
  - Gloria Gaither
- Male Vocalist of the Year
  - Larnelle Harris
- Female Vocalist of the Year
  - Sandi Patti
- Artist of the Year
  - Amy Grant
- Southern Gospel Album of the Year
  - Excited; The Hemphills; Wayne Hilton, Trent Hemphill; HeartWarming
- Inspirational Album of the Year
  - I've Just Seen Jesus; Larnelle Harris; Greg Nelson; Impact
- Pop/Contemporary Album of the Year
  - Medals; Russ Taff; Jack Joseph Puig, Russ Taff; Myrrh Records
- Contemporary Gospel Album of the Year
  - Let My People Go; The Winans; Marvin Winans; Qwest/Warner Bros.
- Traditional Gospel Album of the Year
  - Celebration; Shirley Caesar; Dave Lehman, Shirley Caesar, David Lehman; Rejoice
- Instrumentalist
  - Dino Kartsonakis
- Praise and Worship Album of the Year
  - I've Just Seen Jesus; Bill Gaither, Randy Vader; Gaither Music Records
- Children's Music Album of the Year
  - Bullfrogs & Butterflies Part II; Tony Salerno; Birdwing
- Musical Album
  - Come Celebrate Jesus; Neal Joseph, Don Marsh; Word
- Recorded Music Packaging of the Year
  - Mark Tucker, Thomas Ryan, Kent Hunter Unguarded; Amy Grant
- Album by a Secular Artist
  - No More Night; Glen Campbell; Glen Campbell, Ken Harding; Word
