= Russ Taff (album) =

Studio album by Russ Taff
- Released: 1987
- Studio: Shnaze Studio, The Hop and Studio 55 (Los Angeles, California; Ocean Way Recording (Hollywood, California); Mama Jo's Studio (North Hollywood, California; Wayne Cook Studios (Glendale, California)
- Genre: CCM, Christian pop, Christian rock
- Length: 48:01
- Label: Myrrh/Word Records
- Producer: Jack Joseph Puig

Russ Taff chronology
Medals (1985)	Russ Taff (1987)	The Way Home (1989)

Professional ratings
Review scores
Source	Rating
AllMusic	3/5 stars

Russ Taff is the third album by Christian singer/songwriter Russ Taff, released in late 1987 on Myrrh/Word Records. Taff covers two songs: "Down in the Lowlands" by Charlie Peacock and "I Still Believe" by the Call, plus a 40-second snippet of the American negro spiritual "Steal Away". Taff also records "Breathe Life into Me", which would later be a UK Top 30 hit and US R&B hit in 1988–1989 by British singer Mica Paris. Russ Taff reached number two on the Billboard Top Inspirational Albums chart. The album won a GMA Dove Award for Rock Album of the Year at the 20th GMA Dove Awards and earned Taff a Grammy nomination for Best Gospel Performance, Male at the 31st Annual Grammy Awards.

== Track listing ==
No.	Title	Writer(s)	Length
1.	"Shake"	Russ Taff, Tori Taff, Dave Perkins, Lynn Nichols	4:20
2.	"Walk Between the Lines"	D. Perkins	5:32
3.	"Believe in Love"	Chris Eaton	5:02
4.	"Down in the Lowlands"	Charlie Peacock	5:07
5.	"This Love Is Strong"	R. Taff, T. Taff, James Hollihan, Jr.	5:03
6.	"I Still Believe"	Michael Been, Jim Goodwin	4:31
7.	"Steal Away"	Traditional	0:43
8.	"(Living on the) Edge of Time"	J. Hollihan, Jr.	3:40
9.	"Higher"	R. Taff, T. Taff, J. Hollihan, Jr., John Hiatt	4:54
10.	"Breathe Life into Me"	Peter Vale, Mick Leesome	4:24
11.	"Healing Touch"	R. Taff, T. Taff, J. Hollihan, Jr.	4:45

== Personnel ==
- Russ Taff – lead vocals, backing vocals (3, 8, 11)
- Robbie Buchanan – synthesizers (1–6, 8–11), acoustic piano (2, 3, 5, 11), Hammond B3 organ (3, 11), PPG bass (5)
- Greg Husted – Hammond B3 organ (1, 6)
- Eric Persing – synthesizer programming (2)
- Alan Pasqua – synthesizers (3, 4, 6)
- James Hollihan – guitars (1, 3–6, 8–11), slide guitar solo (5), acoustic slide guitar (7), acoustic piano (8), guitar solo (9–11), acoustic guitar (11)
- Lynn Nichols – acoustic guitar (1)
- Dave Perkins – acoustic guitar (1), guitars (1, 2, 6), guitar solo (1), backing vocals (2, 11), additional synthesizers (2)
- Dann Huff – guitars (2–5, 9, 10)
- Neil Stubenhaus – bass (1, 2, 6, 9)
- Mike Brignardello – bass (3, 11)
- Nathan East – bass (4, 10)
- Jackie Street – bass (8)
- Mel Watts – drums (1, 6, 8)
- Scott Musick – drums (2, 9)
- Paul Leim – drums (3–5, 10, 11)
- Lenny Castro – percussion (1, 4, 5, 8, 11)
- Koji Egawa – door percussion (4)
- Joe Porcaro – timpani (5)
- Jeff Porcaro – hi-hat (6)
- Mark Douthit – sax solo (3), soprano saxophone (4), saxophone (8, 9)
- Clarice Devisschu – backing vocals (4)
- Vince Ebo – backing vocals (4, 9)
- Charlie Peacock – backing vocals (4, 9)
- Rebecca Sparks – backing vocals (4)
- Jack Joseph Puig – ethnic vocals (4)
- Mark Williamson – backing vocals (6, 8, 10)
- Annie Stocking – backing vocals (9)

The 'Boys Choir' on This Love is Strong"

- James Hollihan, Lynn Nichols, Greg Sparks, Russ Taff, Steve Taylor and Mark Williamson

Chant on "(Living on the) Edge of Time"

- James Hollihan, Lynn Nichols, Dave Perkins, Jack Joseph Puig and Russ Taff

=== Production ===
- Lynn Nichols – executive producer, cover design concept
- Jack Joseph Puig – producer, recording, mixing
- Steve Ford – assistant engineer
- Koji Egawa – assistant engineer
- Wade Jaynes – assistant engineer
- Julie Last – assistant engineer
- Bert Stevens – assistant engineer
- Billy Whittington – assistant engineer
- Steve Hazelton – technical assistance
- Mike Wambsgans – technical assistance
- Doug Sax – mastering at The Mastering Lab (Hollywood, California)
- Joan Tankersley – art direction, cover design concept, logo design
- Patrick Pollei – logo design
- Phillip Dixon – photography
- Zack Glickman – management

== Charts ==
Chart (1988)	Peak position
US Inspirational Albums (Billboard)	2

=== Radio singles ===
Year	Singles	Peak positions	
Year	Singles	CCM AC chart	CCM CHR chart
1988	"Walk Between the Lines"	1	1
1988	"Believe in Love"	11	16
1988	"Breathe Life into Me"	11	-
1988	"Down in the Lowlands	-	6
1989	"I Still Believe"	5	5
1989	"Healing Touch"	38	-

== Accolades ==
GMA Dove Awards

Year	Winner	Category
1989	Russ Taff	Rock Album of the Year
1989	Russ Taff	Recorded Music Packaging of the Year
