= The Way Home (Russ Taff album) =

Studio album by Russ Taff
- Released: 1989
- Studio: Bennett House, Franklin, Tennessee; Downstage Studio, Nashville, Tennessee; Gold Mine Studio, Brentwood, Tennessee; Digital Recorders, Nashville, Tennessee; Hollywood Sound Recorders, Los Angeles, California; Wayne Cook Studios, Glendale, California
- Genre: CCM, roots rock, country rock
- Length: 47:51
- Label: Myrrh Records
- Producer: Russ Taff: James Hollihan, Jr.

Russ Taff chronology
Russ Taff (1987)	The Way Home (1989)	Under Their Influence (1991)

Professional ratings
Review scores
Source	Rating
AllMusic	5/5 stars

The Way Home is the fourth studio album by Christian singer-songwriter Russ Taff, released in 1989 on Myrrh Records. Music videos were made for "Winds of Change" and "I Cry" to promote the album. The Way Home was ranked at number 11 on CCM Magazine's 100 Greatest Albums in Christian Music. The album includes a one-minute version of the traditional gospel song "Ain't No Grave" – Taff later recorded a longer version on his 1991 album Under Their Influence. In 1990, The Way Home won Rock Album of the Year and the song "The River Unbroken" won Rock Recorded Song of the Year at the 21st GMA Dove Awards. Taff was also nominated for Best Gospel Performance, Male for the song "Farther On" at the 32nd Grammy Awards. The album topped the Billboard Inspirational Albums chart.

== Track listing ==
The Way Home track listing
No.	Title	Writer(s)	Length
1.	"Winds of Change"	Danny Tate, Danny Wilde	4:17
2.	"It Was Love"	Russ Taff, Tori Taff, James Hollihan, Jr., Darrell Brown, Marshall Chapman	4:26
3.	"Farther On"	R. Taff, T. Taff, J. Hollihan, Jr.	3:49
4.	"The River Unbroken"	D. Brown, David Batteau	4:24
5.	"He Came Through"	Ashley Cleveland, Wally Wilson, R. Taff, J. Hollihan, Jr.	3:10
6.	"I Cry"	R. Taff, T. Taff, J. Hollihan, Jr.	4:07
7.	"I Need You"	Michael Anderson, Guy Roche	4:36
8.	"Go On"	R. Taff, T. Taff, J. Hollihan, Jr., D. Brown	4:22
9.	"Ain't No Grave"	Traditional, arranged by R. Taff and J. Hollihan, Jr.	1:19
10.	"Guiding Light"	Hal Lindes, R. Taff, T. Taff, J. Hollihan, Jr., M. Chapman	4:13
11.	"Take My Hand"	Larry Hall, R. Taff, T. Taff, J. Hollihan, Jr., M. Chapman, D. Brown	4:35
12.	"Table in the Wilderness"	R. Taff, D. Brown, D. Batteau	4:12

== Personnel ==
- Russ Taff – vocals, guitars, backing vocals (1, 3, 5, 6, 8, 10–12), guitar solo (6)
- Larry Hall – keyboards
- James Hollihan – keyboards, melodica, guitars, backing vocals (4, 7, 10–12), guitar solo (7, 12)
- Chuck Leavell – keyboards (8, 10, 11), acoustic piano solo (8)
- John Darnall – mandolin (1)
- Jackie Street – bass
- Lynn Williams – drums
- Terry McMillan – percussion (2–11), harmonica (9)
- Mark Douthit – saxophones (5)
- Mike Haynes – trumpet (5)
- The Real JR Strings – strings (6, 12)
- Don Hart – string arrangements (6, 12)
- Ashley Cleveland – additional vocals (2, 8, 10, 11)
- Greg Sparks – backing vocals (4, 11)
- Rebecca Ed Sparks – backing vocals (4, 6, 7, 10, 11), additional vocals (12)
- Marshall Chapman – backing vocals (8)
- Frank Ådhal – backing vocals (10–12)
- Bonnie Keen – backing vocals (10)
- Dan Keen – backing vocals (10, 11)
- Marty McCall – backing vocals (10, 11)
- Darrell Brown – backing vocals (11)

Production

- Russ Taff – producer
- James Hollihan Jr. – producer
- Tim Crich – engineer
- Peter Coleman – mixing at Mama Jo's Studio (North Hollywood, California)
- Lynn Fuston – additional engineer
- David Garcia – additional engineer
- David Schober – additional engineer
- Elaine Anderson – assistant engineer
- Shawn McLean – assistant engineer
- Gil Morales – assistant engineer
- Chris Rich – assistant engineer
- Clarke Schleicher – assistant engineer
- Mac Smith – assistant engineer
- Dan Hersch – mastering at DigiPrep (Hollywood, California)
- Buddy Jackson – art direction
- Laurie Fink – cover coordinator
- Bonnie Schiffman – black and white photography
- Loren Balman – front cover photography
- Zack Glickman – management

== Charts ==
Chart (1989)	Peak position
US Inspirational Albums (Billboard)	1

=== Radio singles ===
Year	Singles	Peak positions	
Year	Singles	CCM AC chart	CCM CHR chart
1989	"Farther On"	1	1
1989-90	"I Cry"	1	1
1990	"Table in the Wilderness"	13	7
1990	"Winds of Change"	-	19
1990	"I Need You"	33	6

== Accolades ==
GMA Dove Awards

Year	Winner	Category
1990	The Way Home	Rock Album of the Year
1990	"The River Unbroken"	Rock Recorded Song of the Year
