= Right Here, Right Now (Russ Taff album) =

Studio album by Russ Taff
- Released: 1999
- Studio: The Interociter and Great Circle Sound (Nashville, Tennessee)
- Genre: CCM, gospel, roots rock, blues
- Length: 53:54
- Label: Benson Records
- Producer: Russ Taff; James Hollihan, Jr.

Russ Taff chronology
Winds of Change (1995)	Right Here, Right Now (1999)	The Best of Russ Taff (2003)

Professional ratings
Review scores
Source	Rating
AllMusic	4/5 stars

Right Here, Right Now is the eight studio album by Christian singer-songwriter Russ Taff. Released in 1999, it is his first and only album on Benson Records also his first full-length Christian album of new material in 10 years, after 1991's Grammy winning Under Their Influence, his limited country success of 1995's Winds of Change and released two years after the death of his father. Taff's father was a Pentecostal minister and a couple of his songs reflect that on the album. Taff and his long-time guitarist James Hollihan, Jr. produced the album.

== Critical reception ==
Steve Huey of AllMusic says Right Here, Right Now " is among his more introspective efforts, exploring issues of strength, frailty, and the trials and joys of maintaining strong religious faith in the face of human imperfection. Taff is more confessional than many of his CCM peers, coming off as all the more effective in his message through his refusal to sugarcoat."

== Track listing ==
No.	Title	Writer(s)	Length
1.	"Somebody's Comin'"	Mark Marchetti, Todd Snider	5:02
2.	"Back into Grace"	Russ Taff, Jeff Hannah, Marcus Hummon	4:18
3.	"Make Me Whole"	M. Hummon	4:50
4.	"Right Here, Right Now"	R. Taff, M. Hummon, Kyle Matthews	3:56
5.	"Things Will Be Different"	James Hollihan, Jr.	5:19
6.	"Cry for Mercy"	Tori Taff, R. Taff, M. Hummon	5:52
7.	"Long Hard Road"	T. Taff, R. Taff, M. Hummon	5:49
8.	"Lazarus"	R. Taff, M. Hummon	3:52
9.	"As Long as You're with Me"	R. Taff, M. Hummon	4:30
10.	"Shadow of the Cross" (1st movement - excerpts from the Nicene Creed)	R. Taff, J. Hollihan, Jr., M. Hummon	1:01
11.	"Shadow of the Cross" (2nd movement - Orchestration)	R. Taff, J. Hollihan, Jr., M. Hummon	4:26
12.	"Shadow of the Cross" (3rd movement - Vocal)	R. Taff, J. Hollihan, Jr., M. Hummon	4:59

== Personnel ==
- Russ Taff – lead vocals, backing vocals (3)
- James Hollihan, Jr. – electric pianos, synthesizers, organ, melodica, guitars, bass, drums, percussion, string arrangements (5, 9), backing vocals (5, 7), orchestrations (10–12)
- Leslie Norton – French horn (9-12)
- Robbie Shankle – woodwinds (10–12)
- John Darnall – string conductor (5, 9–12)
- Nashville String Machine – strings (5, 9–12)
- Marcus Hummon – backing vocals (1, 4, 8), harmony vocals (2, 3)
- The Otis Redwing Quartet – backing vocals (1, 4, 8)
- Molly Felder – backing vocals (2–4, 6, 9)
- Bonnie Keen – backing vocals (2–4, 6, 9–12), harmony vocals (5, 7)
- Marty McCall – backing vocals (2, 6, 9–12)
- Gale Farrell – backing vocals (10–12)
- Mary George – backing vocals (10–12)
- Gary Robinson – backing vocals (10–12)

Production

- Russ Taff – producer
- James Hollihan, Jr. – producer, recording, mixing
- Lynn Fuston – string recording
- Elizabeth Workman – art direction, design
- Craig Samuel – photography
- Glickman Entertained Group, Inc. – management
