= Medals (album) =

Studio album by Russ Taff
- Released: 1985
- Recorded: September 1984 – March 1985
- Studio: Mama Jo's Recording Studio (North Hollywood, California); Ocean Way Recording (Hollywood, California)
- Genre: CCM, Christian pop
- Length: 45:08
- Label: Myrrh/Word Records
- Producer: Jack Joseph Puig; Russ Taff

Russ Taff chronology
Walls of Glass (1983)	Medals (1985)	Russ Taff (1987)

Medals is the second studio album by Christian singer-songerwriter Russ Taff, released in 1985 on Myrrh Records. Medals would prove to be his breakthrough album. Taff once again co-wrote with his wife Tori, along with his guitarist and songwriter James Hollihan Jr. and contributions from other CCM artists and songwriters like Pam Mark Hall, Roby Duke and Chris Eaton.

== Reception ==
Professional ratings
Review scores
Source	Rating
AllMusic	4.5/5 stars

Thom Granger of AllMusic said the album contained "'80s pop styles and hooky songs, resulting in a CCM classic".

=== Accolades ===
Songs like "Here I Am", "Silent Love", "God Only Knows", and "I'm Not Alone" were Christian radio hits, all hitting the top ten on the Christian AC chart. Music videos were made for "I'm Not Alone" and "Not Gonna Bow" to promote the album. CCM Magazine has ranked Medals at number 36 in their 2001 book CCM Presents: The 100 Greatest Albums in Christian Music. Taff won a GMA Dove Award for Pop/Contemporary Album of the Year for Medals at the 17th GMA Dove Awards. In 1986, Taff was nominated for a Grammy Award for Best Gospel Vocal Performance, Male for Medals. The album peaked at number two on the Billboard Top Inspirational Albums chart.

GMA Dove Awards

Year	Winner	Category
1986	Medals	Pop/Contemporary Album of the Year

== Track listing ==
No.	Title	Writer(s)	Length
1.	"Vision"	Russ Taff, Tori Taff, Chris Eaton, Chrissie Grossman Puig	4:09
2.	"I'm Not Alone"	Russ Taff, Tori Taff, Elizabeth Janz, Paul Janz	4:19
3.	"Medals"	Russ Taff, Tori Taff, Jonathan Sweet, Rodney Trott	4:43
4.	"Not Gonna Bow"	Russ Taff, Tori Taff, James Newton Howard, Michael Landau	3:51
5.	"Here I Am"	Russ Taff, Tori Taff, Chris Eaton	4:11
6.	"I've Come Too Far"	Roby Duke, James Hollihan, Jr.	5:28
7.	"Silent Love"	Russ Taff, Tori Taff, Elizabeth Janz, Paul Janz, Chrissie Grossman Puig, Robbie Buchanan	4:45
8.	"How Much It Hurts"	Russ Taff, Tori Taff, Chris Eaton	4:05
9.	"Rock Solid"	Tori Taff, James Hollihan, Jr. Raymond Brown	4:08
10.	"God Only Knows"	Pam Mark Hall, James Hollihan, Jr.	4:34

== Personnel ==
- Russ Taff – lead vocals, backing vocals (1–4, 9)
- Robbie Buchanan – synthesizers (1–3, 5–10), synth bass (1, 3, 8, 9), Fender Rhodes (2, 5–7, 10), Roland drum programming (3), rhythm arrangements (10)
- James Newton Howard – synthesizers (1, 2, 4)
- Rhett Lawrence – Fairlight CMI (9)
- Dann Huff – electric guitar, guitar solo (1, 3, 6, 9)
- Paul Jackson Jr. – electric guitar (1, 6)
- Michael Landau – electric guitar (2–5, 7–10), guitar solo (4)
- Nathan East – bass (1, 3, 6, 9, 10)
- Neil Stubenhaus – bass (2, 4, 5, 7, 8)
- Paul Leim – drums, LinnDrum programming (1, 3, 5, 6, 9), Simmons programming (1, 5)
- Lenny Castro – percussion (2–10)
- Larry Williams – saxophone (2, 4, 10)
- Bill Champlin – backing vocals (1–3, 5, 7, 8)
- Tamara Champlin – backing vocals (1, 2, 5)
- Tommy Funderburk – backing vocals
- Harry Browning – backing vocals (3)
- Carmen Twillie – backing vocals (3, 6, 9, 10)
- Tata Vega – backing vocals (3, 6, 9, 10), scat (6, 9)
- Lynn Nichols – weird backing vocal (3)

Production

- Russ Taff – producer
- Jack Joseph Puig – producer, recording, mixing
- Mark Ettel – assistant engineer
- Steve Ford – assistant engineer
- Steve MacMillan – assistant engineer
- Todd Van Etten – assistant engineer
- Bob Ludwig – mastering at Masterdisk (New York City, New York)
- Lynn Nichols – creative consultant
- Stan Moser – crucial songwriting input (3)
- Jeffrey Fey – art direction, design
- Aaron Rapoport – photography
- Zack Glickman – direction, devotion

== Charts ==
Chart (1985)	Peak position
US Inspirational Albums (Billboard)	2

=== Year-end charts ===
Year	Chart	Position
1985	U.S. Billboard Inspirational Albums	12
1986	U.S. Billboard Inspirational Albums	7

=== Radio singles ===
Year	Singles	Peak positions	
Year	Singles	CCM AC	CCM CHR
1985	"Silent Love"	1	3
1985	"Medals"	-	3
1985	"Here I Am"	2	7
1986	"I'm Not Alone"	4	6
1986	"God Only Knows"	10	-
