= Winds of Change (Russ Taff album) =

Studio album by Russ Taff
- Released: 1995
- Recorded: 1994
- Studio: Scruggs Sound (Berry Hill, Tennessee); The Interociter, OmniSound Studios, Recording Arts and Secret Sound (Nashville, Tennessee)
- Genre: Country, CCM
- Length: 38:26
- Label: Reprise/Warner Bros. Nashville
- Producer: Randy Scruggs; Russ Taff; James Hollihan, Jr.

Russ Taff chronology
We Will Stand/Yesterday and Today (1994)	Winds of Change (1995)	Right Here, Right Now (1999)

Singles from Winds of Change
- 1. "Love Is Not a Thing" Released: November 1994; 2. "One and Only Love" Released: February 1995; 3. "Bein' Happy" Released: July 1995

Winds of Change is the seventh studio album by singer-songwriter Russ Taff, released in 1995 on Reprise/Warner Bros. Nashville. It is Taff's first, and only, full-length mainstream country album. The title song and "I Cry" are the only two songs from his 1989 album The Way Home that he re-recorded for this album. The first country single "Love Is Not a Thing" debuted on Billboard's Hot Country Songs chart on January 14, 1995, at number 64, peaking at number 53 on February 25, 1995, spending a total of 9 weeks. "One and Only Love" and "Bein' Happy" were also released as singles and music videos performing moderately well on country radio and CMT. Well-known country songwriter/producer/musician Randy Scruggs produced the album's first six tracks, while Taff and his long-time guitarist James Hollihan Jr. produced the remaining four tracks.

== Track listing ==
- Tracks 1 - 6 produced by Randy Scruggs
- Tracks 7 - 10 produced by Russ Taff and James Hollihan Jr.

No.	Title	Writer(s)	Length
1.	"Bein' Happy"	Russ Taff, Tori Taff	4:08
2.	"One and Only Love"	Steven Dale Jones, Bobby Tomberlin	4:17
3.	"Love Is Not a Thing"	Mark Stephen Cawley, Kye Fleming, Mary Ann Kennedy	3:12
4.	"I Cry"	R. Taff, T. Taff, James Hollihan Jr.	4:09
5.	"I'd Fall in Love Tonight"	Mike Reid, Naomi Martin	3:32
6.	"Winds of Change"	Danny Tate, Danny Wilde	4:14
7.	"Your Face"	Cliff Eberhardt	4:41
8.	"Heart Like Yours"	R. Taff, John Barlow Jarvis	3:11
9.	"Once In a Lifetime"	R. Taff, Matt Timm	3:42
10.	"Home to You"	R. Taff, Gary Nicholson	3:20

== Personnel ==
- Russ Taff – lead vocals, backing vocals, acoustic guitar
- Larry Hall – acoustic piano
- James Hollihan Jr. – acoustic piano, keyboards, organ, acoustic guitar, electric guitar, slide guitar, bass, percussion, string arrangements
- John Barlow Jarvis – acoustic piano
- Steve Nathan – keyboards, organ
- Matt Rollings – acoustic piano
- Billy Joe Walker Jr. – acoustic guitar
- Chris Leuzinger – electric guitar
- Randy Scruggs – electric guitar
- Jerry Douglas – dobro
- Terry Crisp – steel guitar
- Paul Franklin – steel guitar
- Al Perkins – steel guitar
- Mike Brignardello – bass
- Jackie Street – bass
- Willie Weeks – bass
- John Hammond – drums
- Paul Leim – drums
- Tom Roady – percussion
- Rob Hajacos – fiddle
- John Darnall – string conductor
- Carl Gorodetzky – string contractor
- Nashville String Machine – strings
- Michael Black – backing vocals
- Cynthia Clawson – backing vocals
- Michael English – backing vocals
- Bonnie Keen – backing vocals
- Mac McAnally – backing vocals
- Jonell Mosser – backing vocals
- John Wesley Ryles – backing vocals
- Dennis Wilson – backing vocals
- Curtis Young – backing vocals

Production

- Doug Grau – executive producer, A&R
- Lynn Fuston – recording
- James Hollihan Jr. – recording
- Russ Long – recording
- Ron "Snake" Reynolds – recording
- Paul "Salvo" Salveson – recording
- Steve Tillisch – recording, mixing
- Brian Hardin – second engineer
- Benny Quinn – digital editing and mastering at Masterfonics (Nashville, Tennessee)
- Laura LiPuma-Nash – art direction, design
- Peter Nash – photography
- Zack Glickman – management
- Walt Quinn – management

== Critical reception ==
Tim Griggs of AllMusic said "With the aid of Nashville's elite studio musicians, Russ Taff makes a joyful noise on 'Bein' Happy,' the album opener on Winds of Change. Taff and gang then tackle topics such a marriage, love, and heartache with mixed results."

== Singles ==
Year	Single	Position
1995	"Love Is Not a Thing"	53
1995	"One and Only Love"	51
1995	"Bein' Happy"	66
