= Under Their Influence =

Studio album by Russ Taff
- Released: 1991
- Studio: Interociter Studio, Nashville, Tennessee
- Genre: CCM, Southern rock, blues, gospel
- Length: 42:50
- Label: Myrrh
- Producer: Russ Taff: James Hollihan, Jr.

Russ Taff chronology
The Way Home (1989)	Under Their Influence (1991)	A Christmas Song (1992)

Professional ratings
Review scores
Source	Rating
AllMusic	5/5 stars

Under Their Influence is the fifth studio album by Christian singer-songwriter Russ Taff, released in 1991 on Myrrh Records. It is an album of traditional spiritual covers that pays tribute to Blind Willie Johnson, Brother Joe May and Mahalia Jackson, among others. Even though the album was originally titled Under Their Influence, Volume 1, there was no Volume 2. Taff and his guitarist, James Hollihan, Jr., produced and arranged the album. Taff re-recorded a gospel blues version of "Just Believe", originally recorded for his 1983 debut album Walls of Glass. Taff won his second solo Grammy Award (his fifth and final overall) for Best Rock Gospel Album at the 34th Grammy Awards.

The album peaked at number five on the Billboard Top Christian Albums chart.

== Track listing ==
All songs arranged by Russ Taff and James Hollihan, Jr., except where noted.

1. "God Don't Ever Change" – 4:28
2. "Search Me Lord" – 4:38
3. "God's Unchanging Hand" – 4:11
4. "Life's Railway to Heaven" – 4:19
5. "Were You There" – 3:05
6. "As an Eagle Stirreth Her Nest" – 4:21
7. "Just Believe" (R. Taff, J, Hollihan, Jr., Tori Taff)– 4:47
8. "Everybody Shoulda Really Oughta Been There" – 2:52
9. "There's a Hand" – 3:43
10. "Ain't No Grave" – 6:26

== Personnel ==
- Russ Taff – all vocals, guitars
- James Hollihan Jr. – guitars, all other instruments
- Jackie Street – bass (2, 9)
- Lynn Williams – drums (1, 2, 6, 7)
- John Hammond – drums (4, 9, 10)
- Buddy Green – harmonica (4)
- Bonnie Keen – vocals (3, 6)
- Greg Sparks – vocals (9)
- Rebecca Sparks – vocals (9)
- Ashley Cleveland – vocals (10)

Production

- Russ Taff – producer, arrangements
- James Hollihan Jr. – producer, recording, mixing
- Hank Williams – mastering at MasterMix (Nashville, Tennessee)
- Roz Roos – art direction
- Peter Nomura – design
- Susan Goines – photography

== Charts ==
Chart (1991)	Peak position
US Top Christian Albums (Billboard)	5

== Accolades ==
Grammy Awards

Year	Winner	Category
1992	Under Their Influence	Best Rock Gospel Album
