= Our Christmas =

Our Christmas may refer to:

- Our Christmas (Sanna Nielsen, Shirley Clamp & Sonja Aldén album), 2008
- Our Christmas (compilation album), a 1990 album released jointly on Reunion Records and Word Records
