= Our Christmas (compilation album) =

Compilation album by Various artists
- Released: 1990
- Studio: Deer Valley Studio, The Bennett House and The Castle (Franklin, Tennessee); Benson Recording Studio, RBI Recorders, OmniSound Studios (Nashville, Tennessee); Kiva Recording Studios (Memphis, Tennessee); Soundscape Studios (Atlanta, Georgia); BMG Recording Studios (New York City, New York); Ocean Way Recording, Soundhouse Studios and Hollywood Sound Recorders (Hollywood, California); Alpha Studios (Burbank, California); Embassy Studios (Simi Valley, California); Studio Prism (Lausanne, Switzerland)
- Genre: Contemporary Christian music, Christmas music
- Length: 44:21
- Label: Reunion, Word
- Producer: Executive Producers: Loren Balman, Michael Blanton, Terry Hemmings

Professional ratings
Review scores
Source	Rating
AllMusic	2/5 stars

Our Christmas is a 1990 compilation Christmas album released jointly on Reunion Records and Word Records. This is the second of a three-album trilogy from Word Records using the word "Our" following the release of Our Hymns (1989) and the upcoming Our Family (1992). Like Our Hymns, Our Christmas features Christmas songs done by CCM artists' interpretation and styles of music. Highlights include a duet with Amy Grant and Sandi Patti singing a medley of "It Came Upon the Midnight Clear" and "O Little Town of Bethlehem" and "One Small Child" recorded by David Meece, a song he wrote back in 1971 and has since been covered by many Christian artists including Evie, First Call and Rebecca St. James. Our Christmas peaked at number 3 on the Billboard Top Christian Albums chart.

== Track listing ==
No.	Title	Writer(s)	Producer(s)	Length
1.	"Reve du Noel" (Michael W. Smith)	arranged by M. W. Smith, Ron Huff	M. W. Smith, Bryan Lenox	5:12
2.	"The First Noel" (Al Green)	Traditional; arranged by Charlie Peacock	C. Peacock, Brown Bannister	4:33
3.	"One Small Child" (David Meece)	D. Meece	D. Meece, Brian Tankersley	5:12
4.	"O Come, O Come Emmanuel" (Bryan Duncan)	Traditional; arranged by B. Duncan	Dan Posthuma	3:18
5.	"It Came Upon the Midnight Clear/O Little Town of Bethlehem" (Amy Grant and Sandi Patti)	Edmund Sears, Richard Storrs Willis/Phillips Brooks; arranged by Michael Omartian	M. Omartian	5:26
6.	"Angels We Have Heard on High" (First Call)	Traditional; arranged by Keith Thomas	K. Thomas	2:49
7.	"O Holy Night" (Mylon LeFevre)	Adolphe Adam, John Sullivan Dwight; arranged by Cheryl Rogers	C. Rogers, M. LeFevre, Scott Allen	5:19
8.	"God Rest Ye Merry Gentleman" (Kim Hill and Phil Keaggy)	Traditional; arranged by P. Keaggy	C. Peacock, B. Bannister	3:41
9.	"Silent Night, Holy Night" (Russ Taff)	Franz X. Gruber, Joseph Mohr; arranged by M. Omartian	M. Omartian	4:35
10.	"What Child Is This?" (Roberta Flack)	William Chatterton Dix; arranged by M. Omartian	M. Omartian	4:16

Note: the track "Reve du Noel" performed by Michael W. Smith is a medley consisting of "Sing We Now of Christmas," "Jesu, Joy of Man's Desiring" and Smith's own composition of "Emmanuel."

== Personnel ==
Lead vocalists

- Michael W. Smith (1)
- Al Green (2)
- David Meece (3)
- Bryan Duncan (4)
- Amy Grant and Sandi Patty (5)
- First Call (6)
- Mylon LeFevre (7)
- Kim Hill and Phil Keaggy (8)
- Russ Taff (9)
- Roberta Flack (10)

Musicians and Backing Vocalists

- Michael W. Smith – acoustic piano (1), keyboards (1)
- Blair Masters – keyboards (2, 8)
- Charlie Peacock – keyboards (2, 8)
- David Meece – acoustic piano (3), additional keyboards (3), backing vocals (3)
- Paul Mills – keyboards (3), synthesizer programming (3)
- Peter Wolf – keyboards (4)
- Morgan Winter – additional keyboards (4)
- Michael Omartian – instruments (5, 9, 10)
- Cheryl Rogers – keyboards (7), Fairlight programming (7), backing vocals (7)
- Jerry McPherson – guitars (1)
- Jimmy Abegg – guitars (2)
- Scott Allen – guitars (7)
- Sonny Lallerstedt – guitars (7), backing vocals (7)
- Phil Keaggy – guitars (8)
- Matt Pierson – bass (1)
- Tommy Sims – bass (1, 8)
- Jimmie Lee Sloas – bass (2)
- Brian Tankersley – bass and drum programming (3)
- Bryan Lenox – drums (1), percussion (1)
- Chris McHugh – drums (2, 8)
- Scott Meeder – drum programming (7)
- Terry McMillan – percussion (2), harmonica (2)
- Mark Hammond – percussion programming (6)
- Nashville String Machine – strings (1)
- Ronn Huff – string arrangements and conductor (1), choir arrangements (1)
- Carl Gorodetzky – string contractor and concertmaster (1)
- Lisa Bevill – backing vocals (1)
- Chris Harris – backing vocals (1)
- Chris Rodriguez – backing vocals (1, 8)
- The American Boyhood Choir – choir (1)
- James Litton – choir conductor (1)
- Bob Bailey – backing vocals (2)
- Vince Ebo – backing vocals (2, 8)
- Kim Fleming – backing vocals (2)
- Vicki Hampton – backing vocals (2)
- Ullanda McCullough – backing vocals (2)
- Michael Gleason – backing vocals (7)
- Taj Harmon – backing vocals (7)
- Wayne Kirkpatrick – backing vocals (8)

== Production ==
- Loren Balman – executive producer
- Michael Blanton – executive producer
- Terry Hemmings – executive producer
- Richard Headen – associate producer
- Tom Ramsey – associate producer
- Traci Sterling – production coordinator (2, 8)
- Todd Moore – production assistant (6)
- Buddy Jackson – art direction, design
- Mark Tucker – photography

Technical

- Doug Sax – mastering at The Mastering Lab (Hollywood, California)
- Brent King – engineer (1), mixing (1)
- Bryan Lenox – engineer (1), mixing (1)
- Rick Rowe – choir recording (1)
- Bill Deaton – engineer (2, 8), mixing (2)
- Rick Will – overdub engineer (2), additional overdubs (8), mixing (8)
- Brian Tankersley – recording (3)
- Paul Erickson – engineer (4)
- Jeremy Smith – mixing (4)
- Terry Christian – engineer (5, 9, 10), mixing (5, 9, 10)
- Bill Whittington – recording (6), mixing (6)
- Ron Christopher – engineer (7), mixing (7)
- Ricky Keller – engineer (7)
- Sonny Lallerstedt – engineer (7)
- Philippe Mercier – vocal recording (10)
- Steve Bishir – assistant engineer (2, 8)
- Steve Egelman – recording assistant (3)
- Carry Summers – second engineer (5)
- Jim DeMain – mix assistant (8)
- Shawn McLean – second engineer (9)
- Ken Love – digital editing at MasterMix (Nashville, Tennessee) (1, 2, 8)
- Carlos Grier – digital editing at Georgetown Masters (Nashville, Tennessee) (6)

== Charts ==
Chart (1990–91)	Peak position
US Top Christian Albums (Billboard)	3
