= Our Hymns =

Compilation album by Various artists
- Released: 1989
- Genres: Contemporary Christian music, gospel, hymns
- Length: 46:17
- Label: Word
- Producers: Executive Producers – Loren Balman and Michael Blanton

Professional ratings
Review scores
Source	Rating
AllMusic	2/5 stars

Our Hymns is a compilation album released in 1989 on Word Records. It features well-known church hymns each done by CCM artists' interpretation and styles of music from pop ("Holy, Holy, Holy" by Michael W. Smith) to rock ("Onward, Christian Soldiers" by Petra) to country ("More Love To Thee" by Bruce Carroll). It is also a trilogy of albums from Word Records using the word "Our" in the series starting with this album, along with Our Christmas (1990) and Our Family (1993). The R&B vocal group Take 6 won the Grammy for Best Gospel Performance by a Duo or Group for their interpretation of "The Savior Is Waiting" at the 32nd Grammy Awards. In 1990, the album won Praise and Worship Album of the Year and Amy Grant won Country Recorded Song of the Year for "'Tis So Sweet To Trust In Jesus" at the 21st GMA Dove Awards. Our Hymns debuted and peaked at number 3 on the Billboard Top Inspirational Albums chart.

== Track listing ==
No.	Title	Writer(s)	Producer(s)	Length
1.	"Holy, Holy, Holy" (Michael W. Smith)	John Bacchus Dykes, Reginald Heber; arranged by Smith	Smith	4:58
2.	"'Tis So Sweet To Trust In Jesus" (Amy Grant)	William J. Kirkpatrick, Louisa M.R. Stead; arranged by Grant, Brown Bannister, Jerry McPherson, Mark O'Connor	Bannister	4:05
3.	"More Love to Thee" (Bruce Carroll)	Elizabeth Prentiss, William Howard Doane; arranged by Chris Christian, Loren Balman	Christian	3:22
4.	"I Must Tell Jesus" (Kim Boyce)	Elisha Hoffman; arranged by Brian Tankersley, John Andrew Schreiner	Tankersley	3:52
5.	"Medley: Near the Cross/My Jesus I Love Thee/Turn Your Eyes Upon Jesus" (Russ Taff)	arranged by James Hollihan, Jr., Balman	Taff, Hollihan, Jr.	5:04
6.	"Prelude: Bach's Bourrée/O God, Our Help in Ages Past" (Phil Keaggy)	Isaac Watts, William Croft; arranged by Smitty Price, Keaggy, Balman	Keaggy	7:02
7.	"O Sacred Head, Now Wounded" (First Call)	Hans Leo Hassler, Paul Gerhardt; arranged by Smith	Smith	5:12
8.	"It Is Well with My Soul" (Wayne Watson)	Horatio Spafford, Philip Bliss; arranged by Watson, Paul Mills	Watson, Mills	4:37
9.	"The Savior Is Waiting" (Take 6)	Ralph Carmichael; arranged by Mervyn Warren	Warren	4:09
10.	"Onward, Christian Soldiers" (Petra)	Sabine Baring-Gould, Arthur Sullivan; arranged by John Lawry	Lawry, Bob Hartman	3:48

Note: The medley by Russ Taff features the following hymns and its writers: "Near the Cross" by Fanny Crosby and William Howard Doane; "My Jesus I Love Thee" by William Ralph Featherston and Adoniram Judson Gordon; "Turn Your Eyes Upon Jesus" by Helen Howarth Lemmel. The medley is arranged by James Hollihan Jr. and Loren Balman.

== Personnel ==
Lead Vocalists

- Michael W. Smith (1)
- Amy Grant (also backing vocals) (2)
- Bruce Carroll (also backing vocals) (3)
- Kim Boyce (4)
- Russ Taff (also backing vocals) (5)
- Phil Keaggy (also backing vocals) (6)
- First Call (7)
- Wayne Watson (8)
- David Thomas (9)
- John Schlitt (10)

Musicians

- Michael W. Smith – keyboards (1, 7), drum programming (7)
- Brown Bannister – accordion (2)
- Evie McPherson – accordion (2)
- Chris Christian – keyboards (3), percussion overdubs (3)
- Bobby Ogdin – keyboards (3)
- John Andrew Schreiner – keyboards (4), bass (4)
- Phil Madeira – keyboards (5)
- George "Smitty" Price – keyboards (6)
- Paul Mills – keyboards (8), programming (8)
- Wayne Watson – additional keyboards (8), guitars (8)
- John Lawry – keyboards (10)
- Jerry McPherson – guitars (1), dulcimer (2), ukulele (2)
- Steve Gibson – guitars (3)
- Michael Hodge – guitars (4)
- James Hollihan – guitars (5)
- Phil Keaggy – guitars (6)
- Bob Hartman – guitars (10)
- Gary Lunn – bass (1), drum programming (1)
- Gary Chapman – bass (2)
- Sonny Garrish – bass (3)
- Jackie Street – bass (5)
- Dave Coy – bass (6)
- Tommy Sims – bass (7), drum programming (7)
- Ronny Cates – bass (10)
- Bryan Lenox – drum programming (1, 7), percussion (1, 7)
- Paul Leim – drums (3)
- Brian Tankersley – drums (4), percussion (4)
- Lynn Williams – drums (5)
- Doug Matthews – drums (6)
- Dennis Holt – percussion (6)
- Louie Weaver – drums (10)
- Kirk Whalum – saxophone (4)
- Chris Harris – backing vocals (1)
- Mark Heimmerman – backing vocals (1)
- Wayne Kirkpatrick – backing vocals (1)
- Donna McElroy – guest vocals (1)
- Christ Church Choir – choir (1)
- Jean McRath – backing vocals (4)
- Alfie Silas – backing vocals (4)
- Ashley Cleveland – backing vocals (5)
- Jonell Mosser – backing vocals (5)
- Julie Miller – guest vocals (5)
- Alvin Chea – backing vocals (9)
- Cedric Dent – backing vocals (9)
- Mark Kibble – backing vocals (9)
- Christian V. McKnight III – backing vocals (9)
- Mervyn Warren – backing vocals (9)
- Dave Amado – backing vocals (10)
- John Elefante – backing vocals (10)

=== Production ===
Album Artwork

- Elizabeth Jones – production assistant (1, 7)
- Mary Gross – album coordinator
- Buddy Jackson – art direction, design
- Mark Tucker – photography

Technical

- Billy Whittington – engineer (1, 7), mixing (1, 7)
- Jeff Balding – engineer (2)
- John Cary – engineer (3)
- Chris Christian – engineer (3)
- Brian Tankersley – engineer (4)
- Lynn Fuston – engineer (5)
- Eddie Keaggy – engineer (6)
- James "JB" Baird – engineer (7)
- Gene Eichelberger – engineer (7)
- Paul Mills – engineer (8), mixing (8)
- Wayne Watson – engineer (8)
- Don Cobb – engineer (9), mixing (9)
- Mark Kibble – mixing (9)
- Mervyn Warren – mixing (9)
- Gary Hedden – engineer (10)
- Mike Mireau – mixing (10)
- Steve Bishir – assistant engineer (2)

== Charts ==
Chart (1989)	Peak position
US Inspirational Albums (Billboard)	3

=== Radio singles ===
Year	Singles	Peak positions	
Year	Singles	CCM AC	CCM CHR
1989	"'Tis So Sweet to Trust in Jesus" (Amy Grant)	2	—
1989	"Onward, Christian Soldiers" (Petra)	—	14
1989	"Holy, Holy, Holy" (Michael W. Smith)	5	—
1989–90	"It Is Well with My Soul" (Wayne Watson)	14	—
1990	"More Love to Thee" (Bruce Carroll)	9	—

== Accolades ==
Grammy Awards

Year	Winner	Category
1990	"The Savior Is Waiting" by Take 6	Best Gospel Performance by a Duo or Group

GMA Dove Awards

Year	Winner	Category
1990	Our Hymns by Various Artists	Praise and Worship Album of the Year
1990	"'Tis So Sweet To Trust in Jesus" by Amy Grant	Country Record Song of the Year
