= Walls of Glass =

Walls of Glass may refer to:

- Walls of Glass (album), 1983 album by Russ Taff
- Walls of Glass (film), 1985 American film

== See also ==
- Wall of Glass
