= No Plan B =

No Plan B may refer to:

- No Plan B (EP), a 2007 EP by Group 1 Crew
- No Plan B (band), a band headed by The Who singer Roger Daltrey
- No Plan B (album), an album by Carman
- No Plan B, an album by 4th Avenue Jones
- "No Plan B", a song by Manafest from the album The Chase
- No Plan B, a 2022 novel in the Jack Reacher book series by Lee Child and Andrew Child

== See also ==
- Born to Sing: No Plan B a 2012 album by Van Morrison
