= Walls of Glass (album) =

Studio album by Russ Taff
- Released: 1983
- Studio: Bill Schnee Studios (Los Angeles, California)
- Genre: CCM, Christian Pop, gospel
- Length: 42:07
- Label: Myrrh/Word Records
- Producer: Bill Schnee

Russ Taff chronology
| Walls of Glass (1983) | Medals (1985) |

Professional ratings
Review scores
| Source | Rating |
|---|---|
| AllMusic | 2/5 stars |

Walls of Glass is the debut solo album by former Imperials lead singer Russ Taff, released in 1983 on Myrrh Records. After he left the Imperials in 1981, Taff started work on his first solo album featuring songs that he co-wrote with his wife Tori and his guitarist and songwriter James Hollihan Jr. "We Will Stand" was released as the first single and became his first Christian radio hit topping the Christian AC chart for 15 weeks. The song is ranked at number 29 by CCM Magazine's 100 Greatest Songs in Christian Music. Taff won his first solo Grammy Award (his fourth overall) for Best Gospel Performance, Male at the 26th Grammy Awards. At the 15th GMA Dove Awards, Taff won his third Male Vocalist of the Year title, his first as a solo artist. "We Will Stand" was nominated for Song of the Year twice at the Dove Awards in 1984 and 1985. Walls of Glass reached No. 5 on the Billboard Top Inspirational Albums chart.

== Track listing ==
| No. | Title | Writer(s) | Length |
|---|---|---|---|
| 1. | "Tell Them" | Russ Taff, James Hollihan, Jr. | 4:23 |
| 2. | "Walls of Glass" | Russ Taff, Tori Taff, Raymond Brown, Keith Thomas | 3:57 |
| 3. | "I Want To Change" | Russ Taff, Tori Taff, James Hollihan, Jr. | 5:05 |
| 4. | "Pure in Heart" | Russ Taff, Tori Taff, Raymond Brown, Robbie Buchanan | 3:59 |
| 5. | "We Will Stand" | Russ Taff, Tori Taff, James Hollihan, Jr. | 4:37 |
| 6. | "Jeremiah" | Michael Omartian, Stormie Omartian | 4:02 |
| 7. | "Inside Look" | Russ Taff, Tori Taff, James Hollihan, Jr., James Newton Howard | 4:01 |
| 8. | "Just Believe" | Russ Taff, Tori Taff, James Hollihan, Jr. | 4:26 |
| 9. | "Kathryn's Song" | Patti Roberts | 4:24 |
| 10. | "Unto the Lamb" | Russ Taff, Tori Taff, Bill George | 2:42 |

== Personnel ==
- Russ Taff – lead vocals, backing vocals (1, 8, 10)
- Robbie Buchanan – Rhodes electric piano (1, 4, 5), synthesizers (1, 3, 4, 10), synth bass (1), acoustic piano (3–5, 10)
- James Newton Howard – acoustic piano (2, 7, 9), synthesizers (2, 5, 7)
- Bill George – Rhodes electric piano (3)
- Michael Omartian – acoustic piano (6, 8), Rhodes electric piano (6, 8), synthesizers (6, 8)
- Michael Landau – guitars (1, 2, 4–9)
- Marty Walsh – guitars (1, 4)
- James Hollihan – guitars (3)
- Nathan East – bass (2, 6–8)
- Richard Hopkins – bass (3)
- Abraham Laboriel – bass (4, 5)
- Mike Baird – drums (1, 4, 5)
- Jeff Porcaro – drums (2, 6–8)
- John Hammond – drums (3)
- Lenny Castro – percussion (1–8)
- Ernie Watts – horns (2, 8), sax solo (3)
- Charles Loper – horns (2, 8)
- Gary Grant – horns (2, 8)
- Jerry Hey – horns (2, 8), horn arrangements (2, 8)
- David Lasley – backing vocals (1, 3, 4)
- Arnold McCuller – backing vocals (1)
- Bill Champlin – backing vocals (2, 6, 8)
- Tamara Champlin – backing vocals (2, 6)
- Carmen Twillie – backing vocals (2)
- Charlotte Crossley – backing vocals (3, 4, 7)
- Jo Ann Harris – backing vocals (3, 4, 7)
- Bonnie Bramlett – backing vocals (6, 8)
- Franke Previte – harmony vocals (7)
- Laury Boone – backing vocals (10)
- Dony McGuire – backing vocals (10)
- Reba Rambo – backing vocals (10)

Backing vocals on "We Will Stand"

- Laury Boone, Harry Browning, Don Cason, Cynthia Clawson, Ragan Courtney, David Lasley, Arnold McCuller, Bobby Messano, Franke Previte, Susan Pyron Heard, Russ Taff, Tori Taff and Gary Whitlock

=== Production ===
- Bill Schnee – producer, engineer
- Russ Taff – vocal producer (3)
- Jack Joseph Puig – vocal producer (3), additional engineer
- Daniel Garcia – assistant engineer
- David Schober – assistant engineer
- Doug Sax – mastering at The Mastering Lab (Hollywood, California)
- Janet Heard – production assistant
- Paul Gross – layout, design
- Gary Whitlock – cover concept, back cover photography
- Sam Emerson – front cover photography, back cover insert photography

== Charts ==
| Chart (1983) | Peak position |
|---|---|
| US Inspirational Albums (Billboard) | 5 |

Radio singles
| Year | Singles | CCM AC (peak position) |
|---|---|---|
| 1983 | "We Will Stand" | 1 |
| 1983 | "Pure in Heart" | 35 |

== Accolades ==
Grammy Awards

| Year | Winner | Category |
|---|---|---|
| 1984 | Walls of Glass | Best Gospel Performance, Male |

GMA Dove Awards

- 1984 Male Vocalist of the Year
