= A Christmas Song =

Studio album by Russ Taff
- Released: 1992
- Studio: Interociter Studio, Nashville, Tennessee
- Genre: CCM, Christmas music, jazz, big band
- Length: 33:37
- Label: Sparrow Records
- Producer: James Hollihan, Jr.

Russ Taff chronology
Under Their Influence (1991)	A Christmas Song (1992)	We Will Stand/Yesterday and Today (1994)

Professional ratings
Review scores
Source	Rating
AllMusic	2.5/5 stars

A Christmas Song is the first Christmas album by singer-songwriter Russ Taff. It is his one and only album released in 1992 on the Sparrow label. Taff and his wife Tori dedicated the song "What a Wonderful World" to their newborn daughter Madeleine Rose Taff who was born in the summer of 1992 while making this album. The album is produced by Taff's guitarist James Hollihan, Jr. A concert video was also released of the same name featuring Taff and his band performing at a nightclub. A Christmas Song peaked at number six on the Billboard Top Christian Albums chart.

== Track listing ==
No.	Title	Writer(s)	Length
1.	"Have Yourself a Merry Little Christmas"	Ralph Blane, Hugh Martin	4:34
2.	"Angels We Have Heard on High"	Traditional, arranged by Russ Taff, James Hollihan, Jr.	2:57
3.	"The Christmas Song"	Robert Wells, Mel Tormé	2:19
4.	"God Rest Ye Merry Gentlemen"	Traditional, arranged by R. Taff, J. Hollihan, Jr.	4:01
5.	"I'll Be Home for Christmas"	Kim Gannon, Walter Kent	4:01
6.	"Let It Snow! Let It Snow! Let It Snow!"	Jule Styne, Sammy Cahn	2:39
7.	"White Christmas"	Irving Berlin	3:51
8.	"What Child is This?"	Tradition, arranged by R. Taff, J. Hollihan, Jr.	2:41
9.	"It Came Upon the Midnight Clear"	Edmund Sears, Richard Storrs Willis	4:07
10.	"What a Wonderful World"	George Douglas, George David Weiss	2:27

== Personnel ==
- Russ Taff – vocals
- Matt Rollings – grand piano, vibraphone
- James Hollihan Jr. – guitars, backing vocals, all arrangements
- Byron House – bass
- John Hammond – drums, sleigh bells
- Mark Douthit – saxophones
- Mike Haynes – trumpets
- John Darnall – string conductor
- Nashville String Machine – strings

Production

- John Huie – executive producer
- James Hollihan Jr. – producer, recording, mixing
- Lynn Fuston – string recording
- Hank Williams – mastering at MasterMix (Nashville, Tennessee)
- Simon Levy – art direction
- Garrett Rittenberry – design
- David Roth – photography
- Jeffrey Tay – stylist
- Robyn Lynch – hair, make-up
- Zack Glickman – management

== Charts ==
Chart (1992)	Peak position
US Top Christian Albums (Billboard)	6
