= Grammy Award for Best Gospel Vocal Performance, Male =

Award nominees

The Grammy Award for Best Gospel Vocal Performance, Male was awarded from 1984 to 1990. From 1984 to 1989 it was titled the Grammy Award for Best Gospel Performance, Male.

Years reflect the year in which the Grammy Awards were presented, for works released in the previous year.

== Winners and nominees ==
Year	Winner(s)	Title	Nominees	Ref.
1984	Russ Taff	Walls of Glass	Dino for Chariots of Fire; Phil Driscoll for I Exalt Thee; Dion DiMucci for I Put Away My Idols; Michael W. Smith for Michael W. Smith Project	
1985	Michael W. Smith	Michael W. Smith 2	Phil Driscoll for Celebrate Freedom; Bob Bailey for I'm Walkin'; Leon Patillo for "J.E.S.U.S."; Steve Taylor for Meltdown	
1986	Larnelle Harris	"How Excellent Is Thy Name"	James Blackwood for Fifty Golden Years; Steve Green for He Holds the Keys; Russ Taff for Medals; Phil Driscoll for Power of Praise	
1987	Philip Bailey	Triumph	Steve Green for For God and God Alone; Larnelle Harris for From a Servant's Heart; BeBe Winans for "It's Only Natural"; Michael W. Smith for The Big Picture	
1988	Larnelle Harris	The Father Hath Provided	Dallas Holm for Against the Wind; Leon Patillo for Brand New; Steve Green for Joy to the World; Wayne Watson for Watercolour Ponies	
1989	Larnelle Harris	Christmas	Steve Green for Against the Wind; Michael W. Smith for I 2 (Eye); Steven Curtis Chapman for Real Life Conversations; Russ Taff for Russ Taff	
1990	BeBe Winans	"Meantime"	Russ Taff for "Farther On"; Eddie DeGarmo for Feels Good to be Forgiven; Michael W. Smith for "Holy, Holy, Holy"; Larnelle Harris for I Can Begin Again; Wintley Phipps for A Love Like This	
