= Mission 3:16 =

Studio album by Carman
- Released: January 27, 1998
- Genre: Christian rock; CCM
- Length: 47:21
- Label: Sparrow
- Producer: Brown Bannister; Bryan Lenox; Michael Linn; Brian Tankersley

Carman chronology
I Surrender All: 30 Classic Hymns (1997)	Mission 3:16 (1998)	Passion for Praise, Vol. 1 (1999)

Singles from Mission 3:16
- 1. "Mission 3:16" Released: November 17, 1997; 2. "Never Be" Released: January 2, 1998

Professional ratings
Review scores
Source	Rating
AllMusic	1.5./5 stars

Mission 3:16 is the thirteenth studio album by American Contemporary Christian singer Carman. It was released on January 27, 1998 by Sparrow Records. The album peaked at number 94 on the Billboard 200 chart. The album was nominated for a 1999 Grammy Award in the Best Pop/Contemporary Gospel Album category. Its lead single, the title track, released as an enhanced CD single, sold over 20,000 units in three weeks.

== Track listing ==
- All songs were written by Carman, except when noted.
1. "Mission 3:16" – 4:11
2. "People of God" – 4:09
3. "Legendary Mission" – 1:42
4. "Never Be" – 3:36
5. "Jesus is the Lamb" – 5:11
6. "Post Lamb Jam" – 0:05
7. "The Courtroom" – 6:47 (Carman, Carl Marsh)
8. "Surf Mission" – 1:14
9. "Do I Do" – 2:55
10. "We Are Not Ashamed" – 4:21
11. "The Prayer Anthem" – 3:30
12. "Missione D'Italiano" – 1:00
13. "Slam" – 4:05
14. "All In Life" – 3:14
15. "Kingdom Suite" – 1:21

== Personnel ==
- Andrea Baca, Lisa Bevill, Lisa Bragg, Lisa Cochran, Todd Cooper, John Hartman, Phil Keaggy, Bonnie Keen, Danielle Kimmey, Tony Orlando, Out of Eden, Joey Richey, Calvin Smith, Kristine & William Stroupe, Russ Taff, Tina Vallejo, Aimee Joy Weimer, Lori Wilshire: backing vocals; arranged by Andrea Baca, Lisa Bragg, Danielle Kimmey & Out of Eden
- Chris Willis, Chris & Matthew White, Emily Webb, Roz Clark Thompson, Kelly Stewart, Traci Sterling, Nicol Sponberg, Lauren Smyth, Kristen Pope, George Pendergrass, Tiffany Palmer, Gene Miller, Ashley Melling, Michael Mellett, Cory Hutchinson, Brittany Hargest, Tabitha Fair, Tim Davis, Stacy Campbell, Evan Broder: choir & chorus; arranged by Dan Cleary
- Jim Butler: rap & backing vocals
- Jonathan Carrey, Matthew Porter: rap
- Micah Wilshire: guitars, backing vocals
- Dave Perkins: guitars & synthesizers
- Kenny Vaughan, Brent Rowan, Jerry McPherson, Tom Hemby, George Cocchini, Mark Baldwin: guitars
- Bruce Bouton: steel guitar
- Tim Akers: keyboards
- Byron Hagen: hammond organ
- Phil Madeira: keyboards & Farfisa organ
- Bo Cooper: piano, backing vocals
- Michael Bragg, Danny Duncan, Carl Marsh, Tony Miracle, Tommy Sims, Brian Tankersley: programming
- Byron House: bass
- Michael Clarke, Dan Needham, Scott Williamson: drums
- Eric Darken: percussion
- John Mock: bodhrán & tin whistle
- Joey Miskulin: accordion
- Jeff Bailey, Alan Brown, Barry Green, Mike Haynes, Sam Levine, Chris McDonald, Steve Patrick, Calvin Smith: horns; arranged by Steve Patrick & Carl Marsh
- Strings & orchestra arranged by Tom Howard
