= Carman (singer) =

American contemporary Christian music singer (1956–2021)

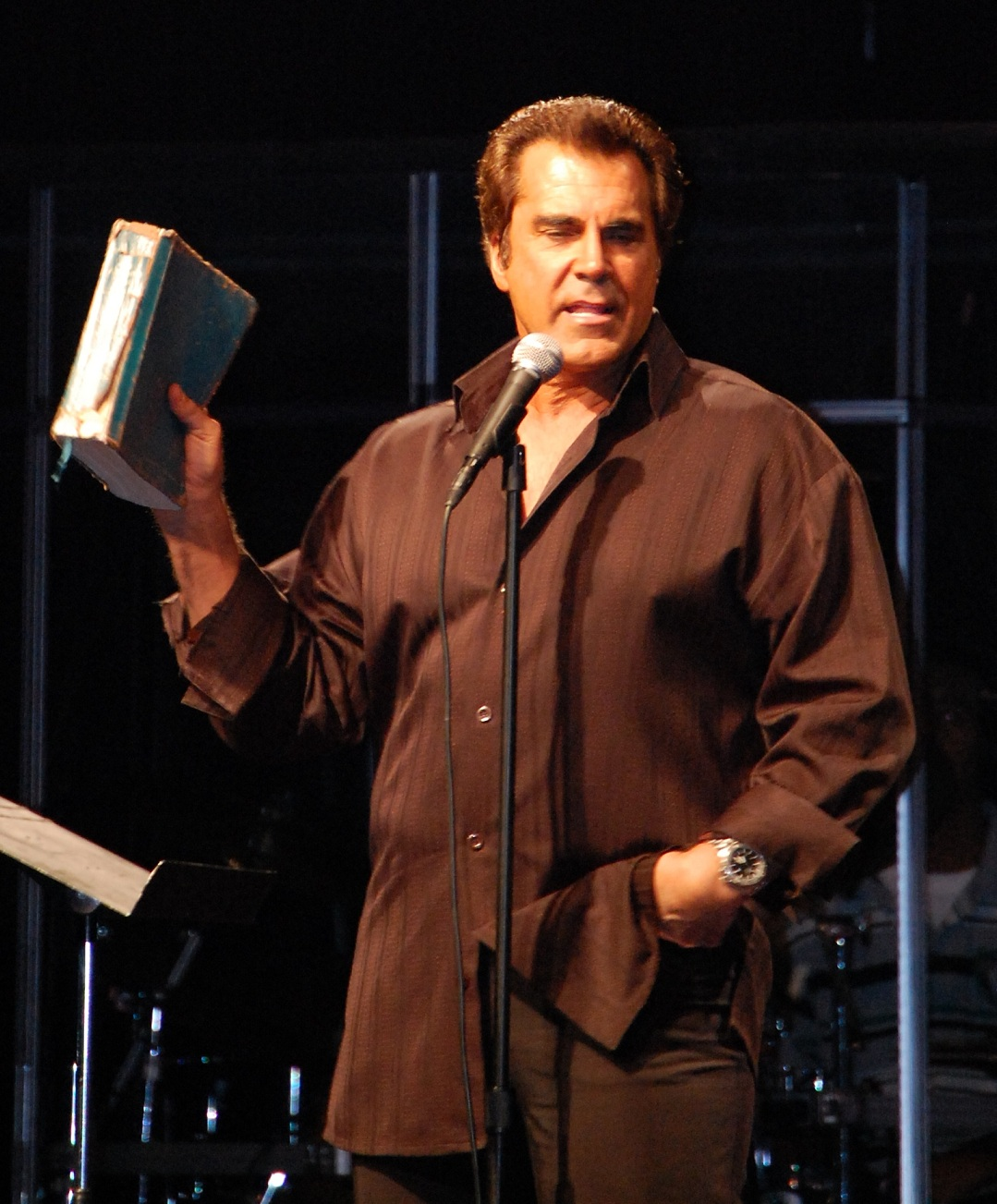
- Carman in 2010

Background information
- Born: Carman Domenic Licciardello; January 19, 1956; Trenton, New Jersey, U.S.
- Died: February 16, 2021 (aged 65) Las Vegas, Nevada, U.S
- Genres: Contemporary Christian music; praise and worship; gospel music; Christian hip-hop; Christian rock; Spoken word
- Occupations: Singer; rapper; songwriter; dancer; television host; evangelist; actor; life coach
- Instruments: Vocals, guitar, drums
- Years active: 1976–2021
- Labels: Klesis; Priority; Myrrh; Word; Benson; Sparrow; Tyscot; Norway Avenue
- Spouse: Dana Morrow (m. 2017)
- Website: carman.org

Carman Domenic Licciardello (January 19, 1956 – February 16, 2021), known professionally as Carman, was an American contemporary Christian music singer, rapper, songwriter, television host, dancer, and evangelist. He was nominated for four Grammys, and sold over 10 million records.

Carman's album Mission 3:16 (1998) peaked at number 94 on the Billboard 200 chart. His album No Plan B (2014) peaked at number 66 on the Billboard 200, and at number 3 on the Top Christian Albums charts.

In addition to music, Carman was a frequent host on the Trinity Broadcasting Network, most notably its flagship program Praise the Lord.

== Early life ==
Carman Domenic Licciardello was born on January 19, 1956, to an Italian American family in Trenton, New Jersey. His mother was a skilled accordion player, and as a child, Carman performed in his mother's band. He learned to play the drums at the age of 5, the guitar at age of 15, and he started singing when he was 16. As a teen, he found some success performing at casinos in Atlantic City, New Jersey. At age 17, he dropped out of high school.

Later moving to Las Vegas in an effort to pursue a career in music, he visited his sister and her husband in Orange County, California. While there, Carman attended an Andraé Crouch concert, where he became a born again Christian and later embraced evangelical Christianity.

== Music and television career ==
In 1980, Carman released his debut studio album, God's Not Finished with Me. It included earlier versions of the songs "Some-o-Dat" and "God Don’t Care (What the Circumstance)", which were re-recorded for his following releases. He caught the attention of Bill Gaither, and was invited to tour with the Bill Gaither Trio, serving as an opening act.

In October 1981 (after relocating to Tulsa, Oklahoma), Carman signed with CBS Records' CCM label, Priority Records. He released his second studio album, and his debut major-label release, Some-o-Dat (initially titled as Carman) in February 1982. It mostly contained novelty songs and was moderately successful. He promoted the album on several Christian TV shows, including The PTL Club.

In July 1983, Carman released his third album (and first live release), Sunday's on the Way. It experienced a string of contemporary Christian music chart successes beginning with the title track, which reached number five on the CCM charts. The album was the first one to crack into the US Billboard Top Christian Albums, landing at number 13. However, two weeks after Sunday's on the Way was released, CBS Records shut down Priority. Carman eventually signed with Myrrh Records, a subsidiary of Word Records. He continued his music career and established the nonprofit organization Carman Ministries, which offered free concerts.

His first album with Myrrh, Comin' on Strong, was released in 1984. It included the song "Lazarus Come Forth", which landed at number 13. It became Carman's first top 10 album on the US Christian Albums chart, peaking at number six. This was followed by The Champion, released in 1985. Its title track became Carman's first number one song on the CCM charts. The album itself reached number three on the US Christian Albums chart, and became his first album to be certified gold by the RIAA.

In 1986, Carman parted ways with Myrrh and signed with Power Discs, a subsidiary of Benson Records. He released his fifth studio album (and first Christmas release), A Long Time Ago...In a Land Called Bethlehem, which reached the top 20 in the US Christian Albums chart. In 1987, Carman released his second live album Live... Radically Saved via Benson. The title track became his second number one on the CCM charts, followed by "Lord of All" reaching number two. The album itself peaked at number two on the US Christian Albums chart, and was certified gold by the RIAA. Its long-form video release also achieved gold status.

Carman's sixth studio album, Revival in the Land, was released in 1989. It became his first number one album, and appeared on the US Christian Albums chart for 33 weeks. It was also his third gold record, which included the songs "A Witch's Invitation", "Resurrection Rap" and the title track. Its long-form video release was certified platinum.

In 1991, Carman released his third live album Shakin' the House...Live, in collaboration with Commissioned and the Christ Church Choir. It reached number four on the US Christian Albums chart, and earned a Grammy nomination for Best Pop/Contemporary Gospel Album. That same year, Carman released his seventh studio album Addicted to Jesus. It became his second number one album on the US Christian Albums chart and his fourth gold record. It included the songs "Satan, Bite the Dust", "1955", "Come Into This House" (with Commissioned), "Our Turn Now" (with Petra) and the title track (with DC Talk). Music videos were commissioned for all songs, and eventually its long-form video release would achieve gold status. The album also earned another Grammy nomination for Best Pop/Contemporary Gospel Album.

Between 1987 and 1989, Carman was named Readers' Choice for Favorite Male Vocalist by Charisma magazine. In 1990 and 1992, Billboard named him the Contemporary Christian Artist of the Year.

In October 1992, Carman signed with Sparrow Records. In March 1993, he released his first compilation album, The Absolute Best. It included the song "Serve the Lord", which was nominated for a Dove Award for Inspirational Recorded Contemporary Christian Song of the Year. That same year, Carman released The Standard, his eighth studio album. It became Carman's third number one album on the US Christian Albums chart, and his first one to be certified platinum. It eventually became his best-selling album. The Standard included the hit songs "Who's In The House" (nominated for a Dove Award for Rap Recorded Contemporary Christian Song of the Year), "Sunday School Rock", "Great God", "Holdin' On" and "America Again". Music videos were produced for every song, with its long-form video release also achieving platinum status. In August 1993, prior to the release of the album and with more than 50,000 in attendance, Carman was the main act in Johannesburg, South Africa. The following year, he embarked on The Standard World Tour, and performed a free concert at Texas Stadium October 22, 1994, with 71,132 attendees. Another concert had 80,000 in Chattanooga, Tennessee. It is believed that Carman holds the world record for the largest single Christian concert in history.

In 1995, Carman translated some of his songs and released his first Spanish-language album, Lo Mejor. From mid-to-late 1990s, Carman achieved several number one albums on the US Christian Albums chart, including 1995's R.I.O.T. (Righteous Invasion of Truth), which became his first album to chart on the Billboard 200 at number 45. This was followed by I Surrender All: 30 Classic Hymns (1997), which peaked at number 102 on the Billboard 200. Heart of a Champion (2000) peaked at number 53 on the Billboard 200, a 30-song retrospective compilation. Grammy-nominated album Mission 3:16 (1998), and its follow-up Passion for Praise: Volume One (1999), also made the top 10 on the US Christian Albums chart. They charted at number 94 and number 179 on the Billboard 200, respectively.

Carman was nominated for four Grammy Awards, and sold over 10 million records. On October 19, 1996, after his R.I.O.T. Tour stop at the Georgia Dome, Atlanta, Mayor Bill Campbell presented Carman with a plaque declaring October 19 "Carman Day".

Beyond his music career, Carman participated in various television productions and interview duties as a host, for both the Trinity Broadcasting Network and its flagship program Praise the Lord. In 2001, he starred in the film Carman: The Champion.

In late March 2013, he announced a Kickstarter campaign for a new album and music video. A short time later, he announced an upcoming 60-city tour, noting that the online fundraising campaign had raised more than $230,000 within several weeks.

In 2014, Carman released the album No Plan B, which peaked at number 66 on the Billboard 200, and number three on the Top Christian Albums chart. It was his highest-charting album on that chart since Heart of a Champion in 2000. Three years later, Carman released his final studio album Legacy (2017), and toured across the United States to promote the album beginning in August 2018. He continued until his final concert in Splendora, Texas, on January 16, 2021.

== Style and themes ==
In her book God Gave Rock and Roll to You, religion historian Leah Payne describes Carman's performances:

Many CCM songs...showed keen interest in spiritual warfare, but [Frank] Peretti's vast, vivid, and rollicking Pentecostal universe came to life on stage with the most potency through Carman's shows. Part Liberace-esque Las Vegas showstopper, part Billy Graham revival preacher, part Rat Pack crooner, Carman's work might best be categorized as 'camp'. His theatrical, over-the-top, gaudy, and sometimes grotesque concerts were multimedia evangelistic extravaganzas meant to impress upon attendees their particular role in resisting and rebuking the devil's work.

Similarly, Carman's musical style has been described by Relevant magazine as "operatic, story-driven songs that often centered around cosmic battles between God and Satan, similar to Frank Peretti by way of Meat Loaf." Referring to Carman as a "charismatic-lounge-singer-cum-rap artist", Jay R. Howard also notes the spiritual warfare themes in songs like "R.I.O.T. (Righteous Invasion of Truth)" and "Satan Bite the Dust".

Conservative evangelical culture war issues, such as "drugs, drinking (and driving), gangs, teen pregnancy, television violence, homosexuality, and AIDS" were also common themes in his music.

In his song "America Again", Carman raps: "In the '40s and '50s student problems were chewing gum and talking. In the '90s, rape and murder are the trend. The only way this nation can even hope to last this decade is to put God in America again". In the mid-1990s, including on The Standard World Tour, Carman focused on the issue of school-sponsored prayer in American public schools. He met with legislators in Washington, D.C., and initiated a campaign known as "Putting God in America Again", which sought to collect the names of one million people who support school-sponsored prayer in American public schools. He stated, "If you want to see a change in our schools, a change in our children and a change in this nation, we must change hearts, and that's what Christ can do. The only hope for America is Jesus."

In 2017, Carman released the song "The President Trump Blues" dedicated to President Donald Trump, making him one of the first Trump supporters among CCM artists. The song's lyrics address Trump's aims and political opposition: "They even tried a recount / People went bezerk / Actors versus electors, man that didn't work / They blamed all the white folks in the USA / They blamed Russia, Putin, Mickey and Minnie and even the KKK / The students cried, the liberals tried, but America had its way / Now we all have to say to our commander and chief today / Mr. President Trump".

== Personal life and death ==
In November 2011, while on his way to perform, Carman was a passenger in a car hit by a truck in the oncoming traffic. The concert went on as scheduled, but Carman collapsed afterward. Taken to the hospital, he underwent surgery for internal injuries sustained in the wreck.

Carman was diagnosed with multiple myeloma in 2013, and was given a prognosis of three to four years to live. By early 2014, he said medical tests indicated his body was free of cancer and then continued preparing for his Live Across America album and tour. When the cancer went into remission, Carman attributed his healing to the faith of his fans and planned his "No Plan B Tour" to start after his health returned.

In December 2017, at the age of 61, Carman married Dana Morrow.

In January 2020, Carman announced his cancer had returned. He resumed live concert church tours in June 2020.

Carman died at age 65 on February 16, 2021, in a Las Vegas hospital as a result of complications following surgery to repair a hiatal hernia.

In January 2026, it was announced that a film, titled Carman: The Movie, would depict Carman's life.

== Discography ==
- Comin' On Strong (1984)
- The Champion (1985)
- Radically Saved (1988)
- Revival in the Land (1989)
- Shakin' The House Live (1991)
- Addicted to Jesus (1991)
- Yo Kidz! (1992)
- Lawrence and the B Attidues (1993)
- The Standard (1993)
- Yo Kidz! 2: The Armor Of God (1994)
- Righteous Invasion Of Truth (1995)
- Lo Mejor (1995)
- Yo Kidz! The Hitz (1996)
- I Surrender All: 30 Classic Hymns (1997)
- Mission 3:16 (1997)
- Mission 3:16 (1998)
- Passion For Praise (1999)
- Heart Of A Champion (2001)
- House of Praise (2002)
- Live & Reloaded! (2005)
- Top 5 Hits (2006)
- Instrument Of Praise (2007)
- Platinum Praise Club (2010)
- Beginnings (2014)
- Best Of Collection Vol. 1 (2017)
- Best Of Collection Vol. 2 (2017)
- Best Of Collection Vol. 3 (2017)
- The Worship Collection (2017)
- No Plan B (2017)
- Legacy (2017)

== Awards and nominations ==
Grammy Awards
Year	Category	Nominated work	Result	Ref.
1987	Best Gospel Performance – Duo, Group, Choir or Chorus	"Our Blessed Saviour Has Come" (with CeCe Winans)	Nominated	
1992	Best Pop/Contemporary Gospel Album	Shakin' the House...Live (with Commissioned with the Christ Church Choir)	Nominated	
1993	Best Pop/Contemporary Gospel Album	Addicted to Jesus	Nominated	
1999	Best Pop/Contemporary Gospel Album	Mission 3:16	Nominated	

GMA Dove Awards
Year	Category	Nominated work	Result	Ref.
1989	Long Form Music Video of the Year	Carman Live: Radically Saved	Won	
1991	Long Form Video of the Year	Revival in the Land	Won	
1991	Short Form Video of the Year	"Revival in the Land"	Won	
1993	Long Form Video of the Year	Addicted To Jesus	Won	
1995	Children's Music Album of the Year	Yo! Kidz! 2: The Armor Of God	Won	
1996	Rap/Hip Hop Song of the Year	"R.I.O.T. (Righteous Invasion of Truth)"	Won	
1999	Long Form Music Video of the Year	Mission 3:16: The Video	Nominated	

Carman was inducted into the Gospel Music Hall of Fame in 2018.
