= Bob Ayala =

American singer

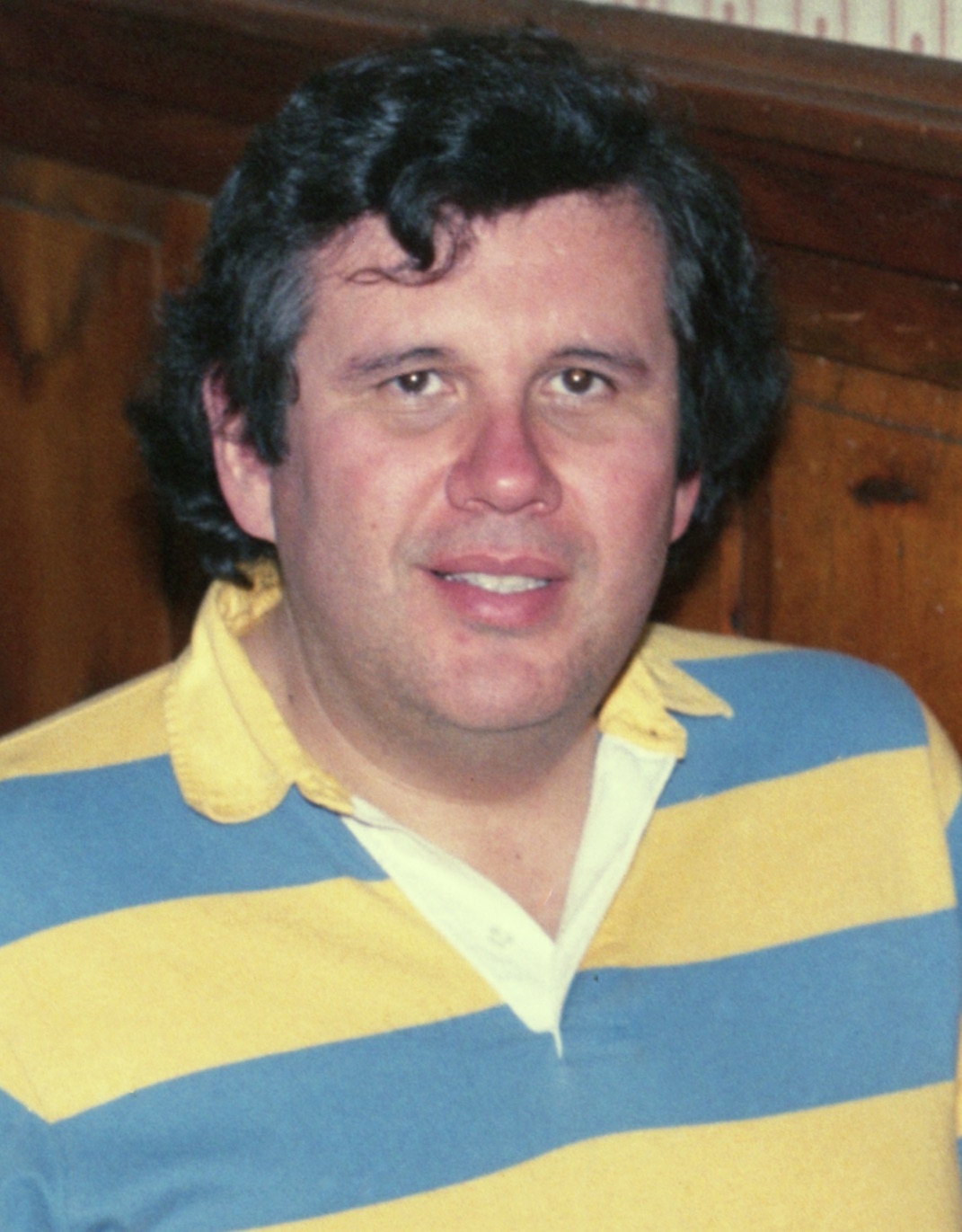
Bob Ayala (November 4, 1989)

Bob Ayala (March 9, 1951 - November 22, 2020) was an American Contemporary Christian musician from Los Angeles, California.

== Early and personal life ==
Robert Steven "Bob" Ayala was born and raised in Whittier, California. He was born with a genetic disease called Retinitis pigmentosa, a genetic condition that causes progressive vision loss.The disease initially presented as tunnel vision in his early teenage years, and by his forties he was completely blind. While he retained some vision as a young adult, he began learning Braille in anticipation of total blindness, although he did not regularly use it. Employment opportunities for blind individuals were limited at the time; one potential option was stocking snack and drink machines at local malls, which he found unappealing. He also worked at a photo developing shop, where his duties included removing exposed rolls of film from disposable cameras.

As a teenager, he played in two rock bands with his friend Den DeMaio. Shortly after graduating from high school, during the Jesus movement back in September 1969, he reported having an encounter with Jesus Christ, which he described as transformative for his life. Bob had heard the Gospel message partly through the ministry of Gene Scott, a Los Angeles preacher who then was a part of the Assemblies of God. Upon giving his life to Christ, Bob left his rock band and started performing publicly in Christian coffee houses, the first being Salt Company in Los Angeles in late 1969. He was a regular at a Christian coffee house in Downtown Whittier. Later, he began playing at Calvary Chapel Costa Mesa, along with several other up-and-coming Contemporary Christian Musicians.

Bob met a girl named Carol Agee at a local donut shop, and right away became fascinated with Bible prophecy and the end times, learning much from Carol's mother, Marilyn Agee, a noted Biblical prophecy enthusiast.In 1971 Bob met Pamela ("Pam") Jean Vandevier and they married on August 25, 1972, in Whittier. Pam began traveling with Bob throughout California and Arizona doing Christian concerts. They performed together as a folk duo.

== Career ==
Bob's musical potential was recognized by his father. He challenged him to begin writing songs, enough to produce an entire record album, so Bob took his advice and focused on the goal. Not long after completing the task, circumstances came into place and the opportunity came for him to sign with a record company.

Bob released his first album in 1976, Joy By Surprise, which was recorded by Buddy King and featured members of Koinonia and his own sister, Shirley, as guests. Following the success of his first album, Bob was voted "Best New Artist" in a poll by CCM in 1976. He released two albums on Myrrh Records soon after. Bob's love for C.S. Lewis' books were evident in his early compositions, some of his songs and album themes reflecting Lewis' allegorical Christian writings.

Sometime during Bob Ayala's early career in the 1970s he toured with Andraé Crouch throughout the United States, opening for him at each concert. In 1981, Bob, along with his wife Pam, did a concert tour of Australia. At that time he was primarily performing songs from his recently released album "Journey."

Although the two never met, Bob Ayala and Keith Green were fond of each other's music, and had the same booking agent. Keith, whose ministry was called Last Days Ministries (LDM), often listened to Bob's music while criss-crossing the country in his tour bus. After Keith's death in July 1982, the leaders of LDM organized the Keith Green Memorial Concert tour and one of the leaders, Wayne Dillard, called Ayala asking him if he would sing at the Los Angeles concert, which he did. Pleased with his music ministry at that concert, he was asked to sing at the San Diego concert. Before it was over, Bob had travelled across the United States and Canada, participating in 120 concerts altogether.

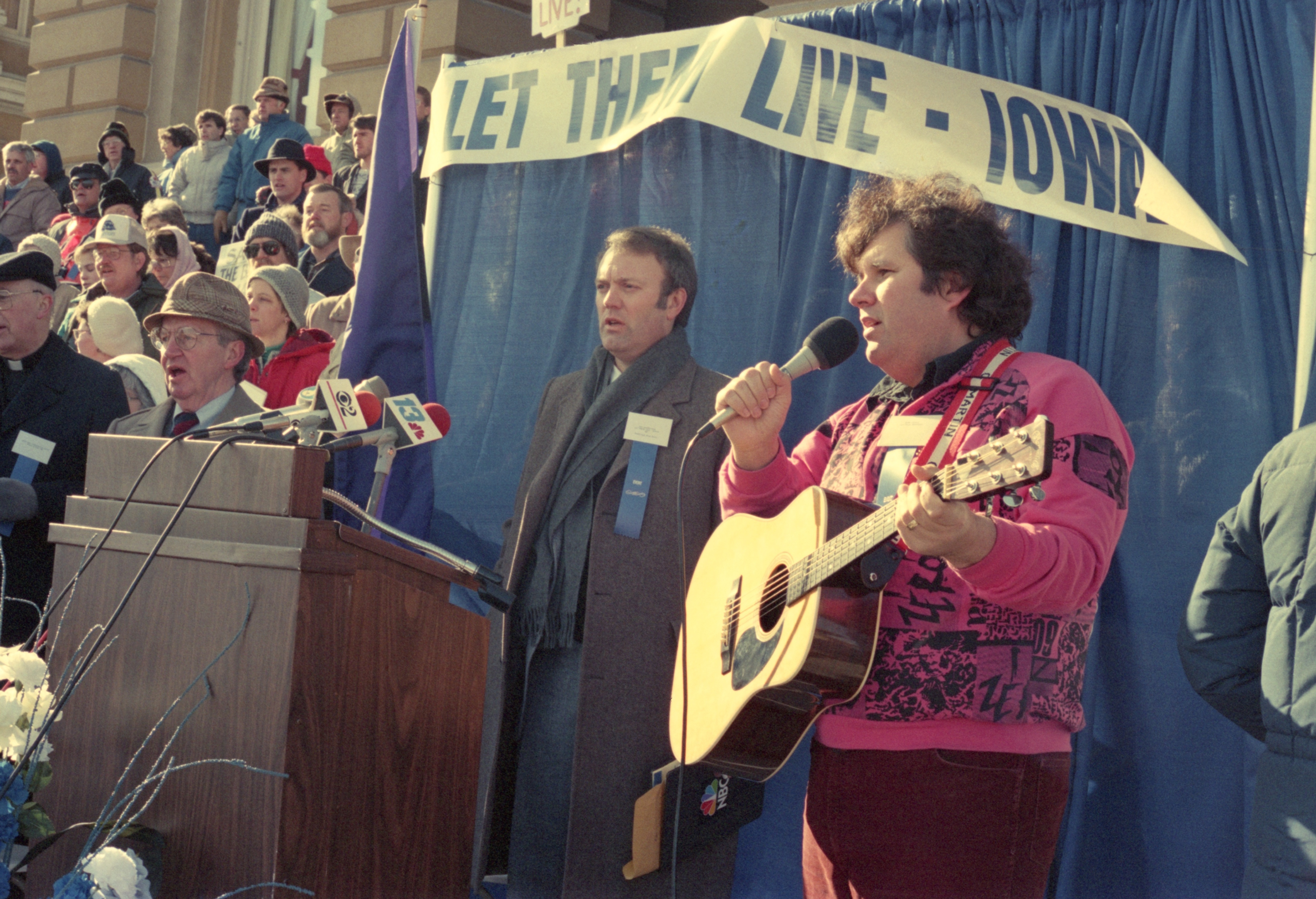
Bob Ayala Speaking/Singing at a Pro-Life Rally in Des Moines, Iowa (Jan. 13, 1990)

In October through December 1983, Bob and Pam Ayala attended Last Days Ministries' "Intensive Christian Training" (ICT) discipleship school near Lindale, Texas. After spending the Christmas & New Year's holidays back in California, the Ayalas moved to East Texas, sensing a calling from the Lord to serve full-time at LDM. While at the ministry, Bob recorded his album "Rescued" on Keith Green's "Pretty Good Records" record label. During his time at LDM, Bob led in worship during ministry meetings, did occasional concert tours, and became active in the anti-abortion movement with Americans Against Abortion, a branch of LDM. Bob Ayala was also active in LDM's "Christian Artist's Retreat," a summer gathering of fellow Christian musicians, including Dallas Holm, 2nd Chapter of Acts, Harvest, and many others, held annually from 1984 into the early 1990s. In the spring of 1987, Bob became part of the LDM leadership council, serving in that capacity through mid-1990.

In early 1985, Bob and Pam Ayala, who had been unable to conceive children, were thrilled to adopt a baby boy. A few years later they adopted special needs siblings, a boy and a girl, whose mother had been a drug addict. Finally, after trying to conceive for 20 years, Bob and Pam gave birth to a son in late 1992. During the mid-to-late 1990s, Bob and Pam adopted their last child, a baby girl.

In early 1992, the Ayala family left Last Days Ministries and bought a house north of the community of Jamestown, Texas. There he continued to compose Christian music and, with the help of his young son Casey, produced two albums on his own Creation Heart Music label. Bob continued doing concerts nationwide, most of the time traveling alone. Also in the early 1990s Bob signed with Integrity Music as a songwriter, composing scripture songs.

During their time in East Texas, for several years the Ayalas were active members of Community Christian Fellowship (CCF), a non-denominational church located in the community of Garden Valley. In 1987-1988 the pastor of CCF was Albie Pearson, a former Los Angeles Angels baseball player, whom Bob had followed in his youth, being a fan of baseball. For a couple of years during the mid-to-late 1990s the Ayalas attended nearby Garden Valley Community Church.

In July 2000, the couple and their five children moved to Nashua, New Hampshire where Bob served as a worship pastor at Grace Fellowship Church. In Nashua, on May 13, 2008, Bob lost his dear Pam to cancer. His church family and friends stepped up to the plate, helping Bob and his children in many caring ways. At the end of 2016, Bob retired and moved back to East Texas, living with his son Casey and his family near Lindale, Texas.

== Death ==
In late October 2020, Bob travelled to Southern California for an extended visit with family, intending to fly back to Texas after Christmas. While visiting his sister in Apple Valley, Bob died unexpectedly on Sunday, Nov. 22nd at the age of 69. Bob had been experiencing balance problems and vertigo, likely causing his fall while showering that morning.

== Discography ==
- Joy By Surprise (Pure Joy Records, 1976)
- Wood Between the Worlds (Myrrh Records, 1978)
- Journey (Myrrh, 1980)
- Rescued (Pretty Good Records, 1985)
- Meet Me At The Summit (Creation Heart Music, 1996)
- Who Was This Man (Creation Heart Music, 1997)
- Then and Now (Creation Heart Music, 2012)
