= Dakoda Motor Co. =

American Surf rock, alternative rock, Christian rock band

- Origin: La Jolla, San Diego, CA
- Genres: Surf rock, alternative rock, Christian rock
- Years active: 1991–1997, 2006–present
- Labels: Myrrh, Atlantic
- Members: Davia Vallesillo; Peter King; Elliott Chenault; Derik Toy; Chuck Cummings
- Past members: Melissa Brewer; Dave Koval
- Website: Official website

Dakoda Motor Co. (also Dakoda Motor Company) is an American Surf rock, alternative rock, Christian rock band.

== History ==
Dakoda Motor Co. formed in the early 1990s; by Peter King, a professional surfer and host of the MTV show Sandblast. They signed with Myrrh Records in 1993 and released two albums before moving to Atlantic Records in 1996.

== Members ==
- Davia Vallesillo – vocals
- Peter King – vocals, guitar
- Elliot Chenault – guitar
- Derik Toy – bass guitar
- Chuck Cummings – drums
- Melissa Brewer – vocals (1995-1997)
- Dave Koval – guitar (1991-1993)

== Discography ==
- Into the Son (Myrrh, 1993) U.S. Christian No. 25
- Welcome Race Fans (Myrrh, 1994) U.S. Christian No. 14
- Railroad (Atlantic, 1996)
