= Dino Kartsonakis =

American pianist of Greek heritage (born 1942)

- Born: July 20, 1942 (age 84); New York City, United States
- Genres: Christian, classical
- Occupations: Pianist, television host
- Instrument: Piano
- Years active: 1963–present
- Label: Benson

Dino Kartsonakis (born July 20, 1942) is an American pianist of Greek heritage. He is known for his arrangements of religious music for the piano.

== Biography ==
Dino was born in Manhattan, New York City and attended Glad Tidings Tabernacle. He began playing his grandmother's piano at the age of three. The first song he learned was At the Cross. He enrolled in piano lessons at age five and developed a love and passion for playing the piano. This love and passion was cultivated as a young boy at his home church, Glad Tidings Tabernacle in New York City where for a time, Dino served as music director and pianist. Dino would go on to receive more formal musical training at The King's College as well as the Juilliard School of Music. Dino served in the U.S. Army in the mid-1960s with an overseas assignment n Germany. After military service, Dino performed in the early 1970s as pianist for evangelist Kathryn Kuhlman, but was dismissed from the ministry over contracts disputes along with his brother-in-law, Paul J. Bartholomew.

Dino has traveled extensively across the globe and has produced well over 50 recordings on his own as well as mainstream labels. He has worked with other various evangelists over the decades, notably Paul Crouch of Trinity Broadcasting Network and former PTL leaders, Tammy Faye and Jim Bakker.

Dino has hosted two television shows over the years: the "Dino and Debby Show" in the 1970s with his first wife Deborah Keener, and "The Dino Show", which aired on the former Trinity Broadcasting Network. Dino describes his style as combining the classical with the sacred. His technique has been described as fluid and brilliant and he has been termed the "Christian Liberace" because of his flair, designer costumes, custom pianos and flashy jewelry.

Many of Dino’s works are religious-based, along with secular and contemporary arrangements of classical works. Dino performed for 18 years in his own show in Branson, Missouri. Among his accomplishments remains his "Peace Series” - a collection of CDs featuring subdued piano arrangements against a backdrop of nature sounds. Today, Dino and his wife reside in Branson, Missouri. He maintains a regular presence on Facebook, selling his CD’s and music books while occasionally performing piano concerts at churches.

Dino performed at Carnegie Hall on December 15, 2005. He participated in an auction benefiting Music Cares, a charitable organization that helps struggling musicians and entertainers.

Dino was nominated and received a Grammy Award in 1998 for his work on the soundtrack of the movie The Apostle.

== Personal life ==
In 1974, Dino married his first wife, Grammy Award nominee Deborah Keener, and together they have a daughter, Christina (who is an accomplished performer, composer, songwriter, producer and has conducted at Carnegie Hall). After touring as Dino & Debby, the two divorced in 1981. In 1986, Dino married his second and current wife, Cheryl, who is the sister of the late pastor and Gospel music singer, Gary McSpadden, formerly of The Imperials and the Gaither Vocal Band. Cheryl has a daughter, Cheri, from her first marriage to the late Gospel singer Jack Toney, former lead singer of The Statesmen Quartet.

In 2007 Dino and Cheryl opened a bakery in Branson, MO called Dino's Cake & Coffee Co. (formerly Dino's 24 Karrot Cake Company). Dino remarked that baking was his passion second only to performing his music. They were a major supplier to the Neiman Marcus stores and cafés In the early 2000’s.

In 2011, Dino and his wife Cheryl lost their home during a flood in the Branson, Missouri area. Dino lost most of his professional possessions such as his grand pianos as well as all of his costumes, industry memorabilia and awards. The Kartsonakis' then started helping the community by doing fundraising concerts to help other victims rebuild their lives and homes.

== GMA awards ==
Eight Gospel Music Association Dove Awards:

- 1978, 1980, 1981, 1982, 1983, 1986: Instrumentalist of the Year
- 1993, 1996: Instrumental Album of the Year

== Discography ==
- 1963: No Greater Love
- 1964: Your Requests
- 1969: The Greatest of Miracles
- 1970: Reflections of Dino
- 1972: Kathryn Kuhlman Presents Dino
- 1972: Christmas with Dino Playing Your Favorite Carols
- 1973: The Miracle with David Rose
- 1973: Alleluia
- 1973: With Love from Dino
- 1974: Dino Plays Folk Musical Themes
- 1974: He Touched Me
- 1975: My Tribute
- 1975: A Salute to the United States of America
- 1976: Dino on Tour
- 1977: Dino Plays Classic Country
- 1978: Love Song
- 1979: Just Piano Praise
- 1979: Rise Again
- 1980: Rush Hour
- 1981: Just Piano Praise II
- 1982: Encore
- 1983: Just Piano Praise III
- 1983: Chariots of Fire (Dino's only Grammy nomination for Best Gospel Performance, Male).
- 1983: Majesty
- 1984: A Christmas Gift of Love
- 1984: Great is the Lord
- 1985: Regal Reign
- 1986: A Place For Us
- 1987: A Piano Portrait
- 1987: A Wonderful Time of the Year
- 1988: Dino Kartsonakis
- 1989: Peace in the Midst of the Storm
- 1990: All Creation Sings
- 1991: Majestic Peace
- 1992: Christmas...A Time For Peace
- 1992: Somewhere in Time
- 1993: Rhythm of Peace
- 1994: Miracles
- 1995: Classical Peace
- 1996: Quiet Time
- 1997: Moonlight Sonata
- 1997: The Apostle Soundtrack (1998 Grammy award for Best Southern Gospel, Country, or Bluegrass Gospel Album)
- 1997: The Lord's Prayer
- 1997: Unforgettable
- 1998: A Christmas Celebration
- 1999: Quiet Romance
- 2000: Quiet Inspiration
- 2002: Somewhere in Christmastime
- 2007: Birthday of the King

=== Compilations ===
- 1976: Christmas with Dino
- 1985: Encore
- 1998: Dino Collector's Series
- 2007: Sacred Piano Hymns

=== Video ===
- 1987: A Concert Spectacular
- 1998: Music For All Time
- 2000: Christmas Extravaganza
- 2002: Easter Spring Spectacular
- 2007: Birthday of the King
