= No Plan B (album) =

Studio album by Carman
- Released: May 27, 2014
- Genre: Contemporary Christian music; gospel; praise and worship
- Length: 46:39
- Label: Norway Avenue
- Producer: Carman; Tedd T; Tre' Corely

Carman chronology
Instrument of Praise (2007)	No Plan B (2014)	Legacy (2017)

Singles from No Plan B
- 1. "Jesus Heal Me" Released: May 8, 2014; 2. "Yes Yes" Released: July 14, 2014

No Plan B is the 17th studio album (and 27th overall) by contemporary Christian musician Carman. It was released on May 27, 2014, through Norway Avenue Records. The album was produced by Carman, Tre' Corely and Tedd T, and was supported by the songs "Jesus Heal Me" and "Yes Yes". The album peaked at number 66 on the Billboard 200, and at number three on the Top Christian Albums chart.

== Critical reception ==
Professional ratings
Review scores
Source	Rating
365 Days of Inspiring Media	4/5 stars
CCM Magazine	4/5 stars
CM Addict	4/5 stars
Jesus Freak Hideout	2.5/5 stars 3/5 stars
Jesus Wired	8/10 stars

No Plan B met with generally positive reception from music critics. At CCM Magazine, Andy Argyrakis rated the album four stars out of five, remarking how Carman "returns with a bang". Kelcey Wixtrom of CM Addict rated the album four stars out of five, indicating how "these upbeat, intensive combinations are a change worth exploring!" At 365 Days of Inspiring Media, Jonathan Andre rated the album four stars out of five, commenting that "Even if his new album doesn't chart well when stacked against today's popular artists, No Plan B still has something great about it" because it is one of his "most unique albums".

At Jesus Freak Hideout, Mark Rice rated the album two-and-a-half stars out of five, noting how "No Plan B is undoubtedly a charming and nostalgic record, but unfortunately, its charm and nostalgia is founded in a sound that is in the past for a reason." Matthew Morris of Jesus Freak Hideout rated the album three stars out of five, highlighting how the release is stereotypical Carman doing what he does best, yet says "Therein lies the problem with No Plan B." At Jesus Wired, Jessica Morris rated the album an eight out of ten stars, illustrating how on "No Plan B, Carman is still as bold and uncompromising as ever."

== Commercial performance ==
For the Billboard charting week of June 14, 2014, No Plan B debuted at number 15 on the Top Christian Albums chart. On its second week, it rose to number three, becoming Carman's 13th top-ten album on the chart, and his highest charting album in fourteen years, since Heart of a Champion in 2000. Additionally, it debuted at number 66 on the Billboard 200 for the charting week of June 21, 2014, becoming Carman's sixth album to enter the chart.

== Track listing ==
All tracks are written by Carman Licciardello.

No.	Title	Length
1.	"No Plan B"	3:40
2.	"Time 2 P.T.L."	3:28
3.	"I'm Coming Home"	3:58
4.	"God Made Man" (featuring Jim Labriola)	4:08
5.	"Peace of the Lord" (featuring Hope Loftis)	4:00
6.	"Jesus Heal Me"	5:20
7.	"It's All in His Hands"	3:57
8.	"Another Day"	3:23
9.	"Yes, Yes"	3:28
10.	"I Did My Best"	2:20
11.	"That's My King/Radically Saved"	5:36
12.	"The Flag"	3:21
Total length:		46:39

== Charts ==
Chart (2014)	Peak position
US Billboard 200	66
US Christian Albums (Billboard)	3
