= Russ Taff =

American gospel singer and songwriter (born 1953)

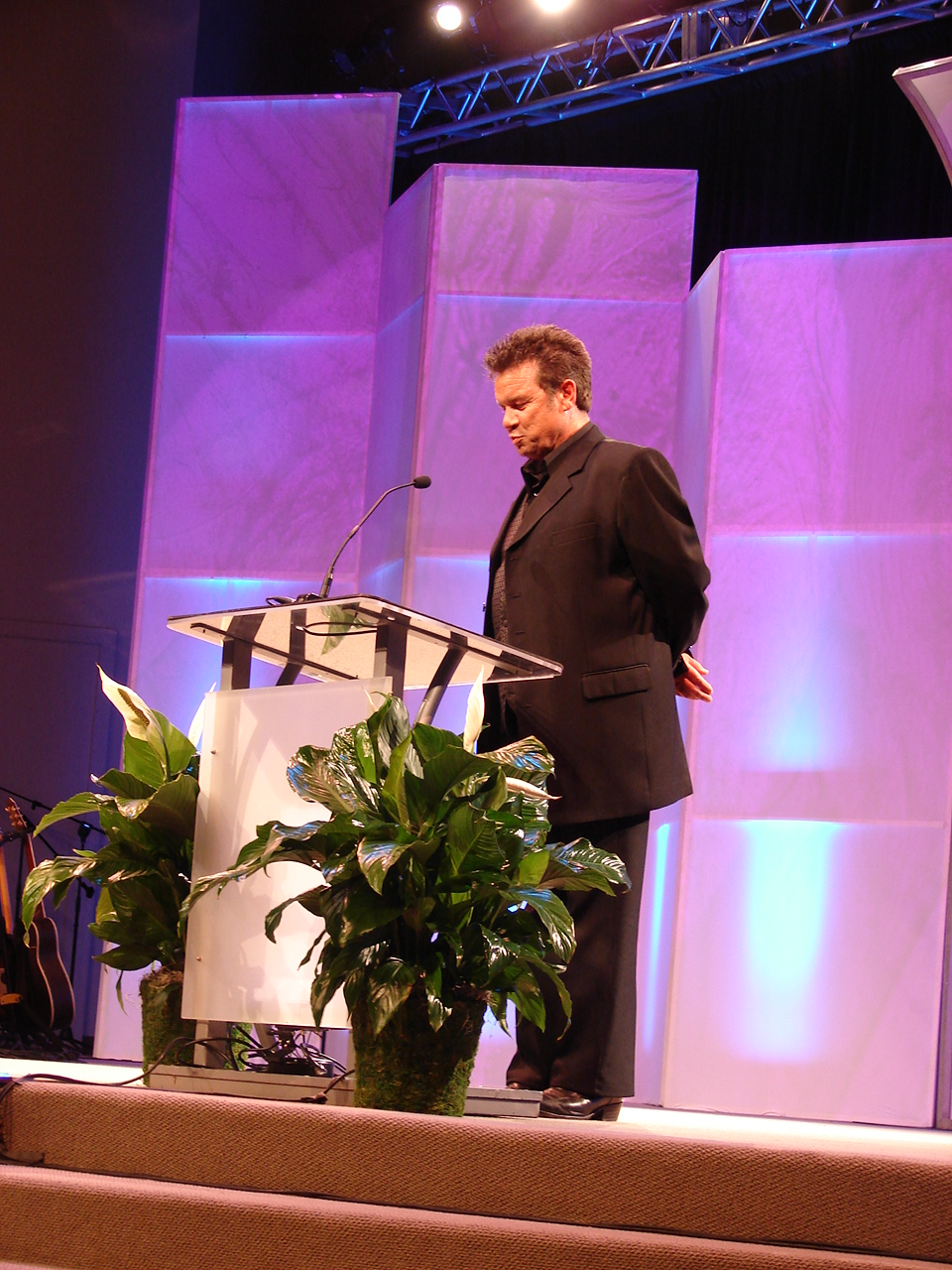
- Taff at the Christian Music Hall of Fame inductions, 2008

Background information
- Born: Russell D Taff; November 11, 1953 (age 72)
- Genres: Contemporary Christian, gospel, Country Southern gospel
- Occupations: Singer, songwriter, speaker
- Instrument: Guitar
- Years active: 1974–present
- Website: RussTaff.com

Russell Taff (born November 11, 1953) is an American gospel singer and songwriter who grew up in Farmersville, California. He has sung a variety of musical styles throughout his career including: pop rock, traditional Southern gospel, contemporary country music, and rhythm and blues. He first gained recognition as lead vocalist for the Imperials from 1976 to 1981. One of his best-known performances is the song "Praise the Lord". He has also been a member of the Gaither Vocal Band, and occasionally tours with Bill Gaither in the Gaither Homecoming concerts. As a solo artist and songwriter, Taff is known for the 1980s anthem "We Will Stand". Taff has received various Dove and Grammy awards either as a solo artist or part of a larger musical group, most notably the Imperials.

== Early life ==
Russ Taff was born to Joe and Ann Taff on November 11, 1953, and grew up in Farmersville, California. He was the fourth of five sons. Taff's father was a machinist and the pastor of the Eastside Tabernacle Church, a small Pentecostal church located in an old laundromat. His mother was a field worker who picked fruit and chopped cotton.

Taff's younger years were spent with the church and a tumultuous home life where he suffered physical and verbal abuse from both parents. His father's alcoholism, which Taff shared later in life, and verbal abuse along with his mom's physical abuse became overwhelming and confusing to the young boy. He retreated to his mother's collection of black and southern gospel albums, as any secular music was forbidden by his parents along with newspapers, magazines and TV.

By the time he was 11 years old, Taff had learned to play the guitar which, along with singing, became an outlet for him from the familial strife. He credits his oldest brother, Bill, with being highly influential at this time, taking him to "all-night gospel sings and that sort of thing." The family moved to Hot Springs, Arkansas when Taff was 15 only to move back to California a few years later with Taff remaining in Arkansas to start college. It was at this time that he began listening to popular music for the first time.

This was also the time, historically speaking, when the Jesus movement was in evidence across the United States. At age 16, Taff started a band with James Hollihan, Jr. (who became a lifelong musical friend and frequent co-producer) which they named Sounds of Joy. This led to an opportunity to play at the high school they attended which opened many opportunities to share their faith with other classmates during this remarkable time in history. Sounds of Joy covered artists like Love Song and Larry Norman. The group ended up recording 3 albums of their own, one of which was produced by Gary Paxton. At one point in the 70s, Sounds of Joy got the opportunity to open for the Imperials who were recognized as one of the trailblazing artists in the field of what became known as Contemporary Christian Music (CCM).

== The Imperials ==
Sometime prior to 1976, Taff toured as a singer with evangelist Jerry Savelle. Aside from the opportunity to perform, he was "really studying the Bible" after his many years of being influenced by the emotionalism of his Pentecostal upbringing. In 1976, having made an impression on the group 2 years earlier, The Imperials called with an offer to audition for the position as the group's new lead singer. Two weeks before his 23rd birthday, Taff traveled to Nashville, where the tryouts were taking place. Taff said "I sang with them that afternoon and that evening they hired me. I joined the Imperials when I was 22, and I’ve been riding buses ever since." His first appearance on an Imperials album was on 1977's Sail On which won the Grammy for Best Gospel Performance, Contemporary Or Inspirational. Taff remained their lead singer from 1976 through 1981 for what is recognized as the Imperials most successful period as a group.

Part of the reason Taff left the group in 1981 was due to the financial arrangements he had with them. He was paid a straight salary for his work within the group, which meant he did not share in any of the monies generated by ticket or album sales. Mark Allen Powell, writing in the ECCM, opined that this arrangement was likely fine when he first signed on with the Imperials, but was not an equitable situation when Taff's membership turned the group into the ‘single best-selling contemporary Christian music group’ in the US for the period of time he was a member. During his time with the Imperials the group garnered 3 Grammys and 5 Dove Awards with Taff earning 1 Dove Award himself. It was also during this time, at age 26, that the alcoholism that had been a part of the earlier family dynamic with his father became a part of Taff's own life.

== Solo career to current ==
His time with the Imperials laid the groundwork for Taff's subsequent solo career. He has released 12 solo albums, earning two Grammys and five additional Dove Awards. He became highly regarded for his vocal ability with Billboard at one time calling him "the single most electrifying voice in Christian music". Aside from his own projects, Taff frequently appeared as a guest vocalist on other artist's albums. In fact, he mentioned that at one point his label had explored the idea of releasing an album of the duets he had sung with other artists, but soon realized that the resulting record would have resulted in a double disc worth of material. His 1985 album, Medals, was well received critically, moving CCM magazine to predict it would be that years’ choice for best album. While that prediction did not come to pass--U2's Unforgettable Fire received that honor--it became regarded as a classic among contemporary Christian albums. A 2001 poll of critics undertaken by CCM Magazine placed Medals at 36 on the list of the ‘greatest’ 100 Christian albums at that time. It did receive criticisms of sounding a ‘bit too derivative’ of Hall & Oates and its themes being too geared toward "simplistic triumphalism" as mentioned by Brian Quincy Newcomb and "expressive of a militancy" that was inappropriate for Christian music.

In 1991, Taff was invited by Bill Gaither to join the Gaither Homecoming video series leading to guest appearances in the Homecoming concerts. He also briefly replaced Michael English in the Gaither Vocal Band in 1994. He had been doing a few solo albums during this time when he released the mainstream country album, Winds of Change (1995), on Reprise which was followed by his return to CCM after a decade-long absence from Christian pop with Right Here, Right Now in 1999, two years after the death of his father. He then joined the Gaither Vocal Band again, singing with them from 2001 to 2004. He still performs at some of the larger Gaither events along with doing solo appearances two weekends a month.

I Still Believe, a documentary film on Taff by director Rick Altizer saw limited release in October 2018. The film explores Taff's life from early childhood to present day touching on the family strife, singing career and dealing with his own issues of alcoholism.

== Personal ==
Taff is married and with his wife Tori, whom he married the same year he joined the Imperials, has two adult daughters. Tori is quite involved with her husband's career as she is his main songwriting partner. Taff's history of alcohol abuse, which started when he was 26, did experience a stretch of sobriety from 1988 to 1997 between his father and mother's deaths, but did not last. He finally gained victory over his addiction through Christian counseling and intense trauma therapy.

== Discography ==
Solo albums

Year	Album	US Christian	Record label	Record producers
1983	Walls of Glass	5	Myrrh	Bill Schnee
1985	Medals	2	Myrrh	Jack Joseph Puig, Russ Taff
1987	Russ Taff	2	Myrrh	Jack Joseph Puig
1989	The Way Home	1	Myrrh	James Hollihan Jr., R. Taff
1991	Under Their Influence	5	Myrrh	James Hollihan Jr., R. Taff
1992	A Christmas Song	6	Sparrow	James Hollihan, Jr.
1995	Winds of Change		Reprise	Hollihan, Randy Scruggs, Taff
1999	Right Here, Right Now		Benson	James Hollihan Jr., Taff
2007	Now More Than Ever	41	Spring Hill	Hollihan, Barry Jennings, Michael Sykes, Taff
2010	Another Sentimental Christmas		Spring Hill	James Hollihan, Jr.
2011	Faroe Islands		Spring Hill	Jákup Zachariassen, Óli Poulsen, Kristoffur Mørkøre
2018	Believe		Sweetwater Studios	Phil Naish, Mark Hornsby
2025	Cover Story		Independent	John Mark Painter

Compilations

- 2003: The Best of Russ Taff (Spring Hill)
- 2014: Beginnings
- 2014: The Ultimate Collection

With the Sounds of Joy

- 1974: YHWH (Shalom Records)
- 1975: Sharin' (JoySong Records)

With the Imperials

- 1977: Sail On (Dayspring/Word)
- 1978: Imperials Live (Dayspring/Word)
- 1979: Heed The Call (Dayspring/Word)
- 1979: One More Song For You (Dayspring/Word)
- 1980: Priority (Dayspring/Word)
- 1980: Christmas with the Imperials (Dayspring/Word)
- 1981: The Very Best of the Imperials (Dayspring/Word) compilation
- 1986: Old Fashioned Faith (Dayspring/Word) compilation
- 1996: Legacy 1977–1988 (Word Records) compilation
- 2006: The Lost Album (Word Records) (originally recorded in 1976)
- 2006: The Imperials – Classic Hits (New Haven/Provident) compilation
- 2007: The Definitive Collection (Word/Warner) compilation

With Gaither Vocal Band

- 2002: Everything Good (SpringHouse/EMI)
- 2003: A Cappella (SpringHouse/EMI)

Appearances on other albums

- 1981: For Every Man Steve Camp "Thank You"
- 1981: Love Overflowing Sandi Patty "The Home of the Lord"
- 1983: More than a Feelin' Koinonia (Sparrow) "Give Your Love", "Divina"
- 1984: For People Who Don't Hear The Music Anymore (Word) Joyce Landorf "I'll Keep My Eyes on You"
- 1984: Dancing with Danger Leslie Phillips (Myrrh) "Strength of My Life"
- 1984: The Praise in Us – A Word Family Praise Album Various Artists (Myrrh) "Simple Song for a Mighty God"
- 1984: Vital Signs – White Heart (Home Sweet Home Records/Myrrh) "We Are His Hands"
- 1985: The CAUSE (various artists) (Sparrow) "Do Something Now"
- 1985: Lulu Roman Smith "King of Who I Am"
- 1985: Sheep in Wolves Clothing Mylon LeFevre and Broken Heart (Myrrh) "Gospel Ship"
- 1988: Phil Keaggy & Sunday's Child Phil Keaggy (Myrrh) "Aint Got No"
- 1988: Can't Buy a Miracle Randy Stonehill (Word) "Awfully Loud World"
- 1988: Lead Me On – Amy Grant (A&M) "All Right"
- 1989: Our Hymns (Word) Medley: "Near The Cross"/"My Jesus I Love Thee"/"Turn Your Eyes upon Jesus"
- 1990: Phase II Eddie DeGarmo (Fore Front) "There's Something About That Name"
- 1990: Stolen Moments – John Hiatt (A&M)
- 1990: Through Flood & Fire – Sparks (Reunion) "Jesus Rescues Me"
- 1990: Our Christmas (Word) "Silent Night"
- 1990: Handel's Young Messiah (A&M) "He Shall Feed His Flock Like a Shepherd" with Sheila Walsh
- 1991: For Such a Time as This Sheila Walsh (Star Song) "A Dove Amongst Eagles"
- 1991: Big Town – Ashley Cleveland (Atlantic)
- 1991: Show Me Your Way Glen Campbell (New Haven) "The Greatest Gift of All"
- 1992: Above And Beyond O'Landa Draper & The Associates (Word) "Wipe A Tear"
- 1992: Innocent Eyes Tanya Goodman Sykes (Benson) "Who at My Door Is Standing?"
- 1992: No Compromise: Remembering the Music of Keith Green (Sparrow) "Your Love Broke Through"
- 1992: Did You Think to Pray This Morning? – The Johnson Sisters with Russ Taff (Canaan)
- 1993: Lead Me Not – Lari White (RCA)
- 1993: Sweet Relief: A Benefit for Victoria Williams – various artists (Thirsty Ear/Chaos)
- 1995: Beyond December – First Call (Warner Alliance)
- 1996: Way I Should – Iris DeMent (Warner Bros.)
- 1997: Fire Down Below original soundtrack (Warner Brothers) "I'd Walk Through Fire"
- 1997: Misguided Roses – Edwin McCain Band (Atlantic)
- 1998: Alabama Song – Allison Moorer (MCA)
- 1998: The Apostle original soundtrack (Rising Tide) "There Ain't No Grave Gonna Hold My Body Down"
- 1998: Joy – Melissa Manchester (Capitol)
- 1998: Mission 3:16 – Carman (Sparrow) "People of God"
- 1998: Totally Committed – Jeff Foxworthy (Warner Bros.)
- 1998: Jesus Saves Greg Long (Myrrh) "Prove That By Me"
- 1999: Vestal & Friends – Vestal Goodman "Giver of Life"
- 1999: Bridges original soundtrack (Verity) "Raven and the Dove"
- 2000: Child of the Promise original cast recording (Sparrow) "The Mary I Know", "Mary Recitative", "Zacharias Recitative", "Nothing Ever Happens to a Shepherd"
- 2000: Hands of Time – Anthony Burger (Daywind) "I Wish We'd All Been Ready"
- 2000: Ordinary Day – Jeff and Sheri Easter (Spring Hill) "One Way"
- 2001: Supernatural – The Raphaels (Track Records)
- 2001: Press On – Selah (Curb) "Were You There"
- 2002: Traveling Light: Songs from the 23rd Psalm (Brentwood) "Let It Flow"
- 2002: Edge of the World – Randy Stonehill (Fair Oaks) "We Were So Young"
- 2004: Better Days – Frank Bradford (Frb Records) "Watergrave"
- 2005: Hymned No. 1 – Bart Millard (of MercyMe) (INO/Epic) "Precious Lord, Take My Hand"
- 2006: Stand – Avalon (Sparrow/EMI) "We Will Stand"
- 2008: Fall Like Rain – Clint Brown (Tribe Records) "I'm Forgiven"
- 2016: Circuit Rider – William Lee Golden (Gaither Gospel Series)
- 2022: There's a Rainbow Somewhere: The Songs of Randy Stonehill – various artists (RB MacNeel Music) "Remember My Name"

=== Solo singles ===
Year	Single	US Country	Album
1983	"We Will Stand"		Walls of Glass
1985	"I'm Not Alone"		Medals
1995	"Love Is Not a Thing"	53	Winds of Change
1995	"One and Only Love"	51	Winds of Change
1995	"Bein' Happy"	66	Winds of Change

== Video ==
Long-form

- 1982: More Than Music No. 1 (Word) (originally aired as a TV show in 1981) "I Go to the Rock", "Here We Are" (duet with Amy Grant)
- 1992: Russ Taff: A Christmas Song (Sparrow)
- 2002: I Do Believe Gaither Vocal Band "One Way"
- 2006: Ernie Haase & Signature Sound "Hold To God's Unchanging Hand"
- 2007: The Best of Russ Taff From the Gaither Homecoming Series
- 2007: Timeless: Concert of Faith & Inspiration
- 2009: Gaither Vocal Band Reunion: Vol. 1 "Born Again", "Heartbreak Ridge And New Hope Road", "Knowing You'll Be There"
- 2009: Gaither Vocal Band Reunion: Vol. 2 "The Really Big News", "When The Rains Come"

Concept Music videos

Year	Video	Director
1985	"I'm Not Alone"	
1985	"Not Gonna Bow"	
1989	"Winds Of Change"	
1989	"I Cry"	
1991	"Life's Railway to Heaven"	
1995	"Love Is Not a Thing"	Deaton-Flanigen Productions
1995	"One And Only Love"	

Gaither Homecoming video performances

- 1998: Down by the Tabernacle "The Tabernacle", "I Saw the Light"
- 1998: Rivers of Joy "We Will Stand"
- 1999: I'll Meet You on the Mountain "Hold To God's Unchanging Hand"
- 2000: Good News "When He Set Me Free"
- 2000: Irish Homecoming "Ain't No Grave"
- 2000: Whispering Hope "O Say, But I'm Glad"
- 2001: A Billy Graham Music Homecoming, Vol.2 "My Tribute"
- 2001: London Homecoming "We Will Stand"
- 2002: Let Freedom Ring "When He Calls I'll Fly Away"
- 2002: New Orleans Homecoming "Praise The Lord"
- 2003: Australian Homecoming
- 2003: Red Rocks Homecoming "They Call It Gospel Music"
- 2003: Rocky Mountain Homecoming "The Workshop of the Lord"
- 2004: Journey to the Sky "Trumpet Of Jesus"
- 2004: Passin' the Faith Along "Born Again"
- 2004: We Will Stand "We Will Stand"
- 2005: Jerusalem Homecoming "Bethlehem, Galilee, Gethsemane"
- 2006: Canadian Homecoming "More Than Ever"
- 2006: Live from Toronto "Trumpet Of Jesus"
- 2006: Christmas in South Africa "Higher Than Mt. Kilimanjaro"
- 2007: Amazing Grace "Amazing Grace"
- 2008: Homecoming Picnic "The Sweetest Song I Know"
- 2009: Joy in My Heart "Jesus Is The Best Thing"
- 2011: Alaskan Homecoming "Somebody's Coming", "We Will Stand"
- 2011: Majesty "I Shall Wear A Crown"

== Awards and honors ==
=== Grammys ===
With the Imperials

- 1977 Best Gospel Performance, Contemporary or Inspirational for Sail On
- 1979 Best Gospel Performance, Contemporary or Inspirational for Heed the Call
- 1981 Best Gospel Performance, Contemporary or Inspirational for Priority

Solo

- 1983 Best Gospel Performance, Male for Walls of Glass
- 1991 Best Rock/Contemporary Gospel Album for Under Their Influence

=== GMA Doves ===
As member of the Imperials

- 1977: Male Group of the Year
- 1979: Male Group of the Year
- 1980: Male Group of the Year
- 1981: Male Group of the Year
- 1981: Song of the Year – "Praise The Lord"
- 1981: Male Vocalist of the Year
- 1982: Male Vocalist of the Year
- 1998: Inducted into the GMA's Gospel Music Hall of Fame (with all five original members: Jake Hess, Armond Morales, Gary McSpadden, Sherrill Neilsen & Henry Slaughter, as well as Joe Moscheo, Terry Blackwood, Sherman Andrus, and Jim Murray)

Solo

- 1984: Male Vocalist of the Year
- 1986: Pop/Contemporary Album of the Year for Medals
- 1989: Rock Album of the Year for Russ Taff
- 1989: Recorded Music Packaging of the Year for Russ Taff
- 1990: Rock Album of the Year for The Way Home
- 1990: Rock Recorded Song of the Year for "The River Unbroken"
- 2016: Inducted into the GMA's Gospel Music Hall of Fame

Nominations with the Gaither Vocal Band

- 2003: Southern Gospel Recorded Song of the Year
- 2003: Country Album of the Year

== See also ==
- Dove Award for Song of the Year
- Grammy Award for Best Gospel Performance, Contemporary

== Sources ==
- Encyclopedia of Contemporary Christian Music; Powell; pp 46, 47; Hendrickson Publishers; Pap/Cdr edition (August 2002) ISBN 1-56563-679-1 ISBN 978-1565636798
- Alfonso, Barry (2002) s The Billboard Guide to Contemporary Christian Music
- Jones, Kim (2008) About.com
- Larkin, Colin (2006) The Encyclopedia of Popular Music
- Mansfield, Brian (2005) Allmusic.com
- TPE Interview (2006). Today's Pentecostal Evangel
