= Word Records =

Christian-based entertainment company

- Parent company: Curb Records
- Founded: 1951
- Founder: Jarrell McCracken, Henry SoRelle, Ted Snider
- Distributors: Word Distribution; Warner Records
- Genre: Gospel, contemporary Christian music
- Country of origin: United States
- Location: Nashville, Tennessee
- Official website: wordentertainment.com

Word Records is a Christian faith-based entertainment company based in Nashville, Tennessee. It is owned by Curb Records, and is a part of Word Entertainment. It is distributed by Warner Records (the former Warner Bros. Records).

== History ==
In 1951, Word Records was established in Waco, Texas by Jarrell McCracken, Baylor business major Henry SoRelle and radio/television executive Ted Snider. The label's name is based on a 16-minute spoken word recording written and narrated by McCracken, the first recording released by the label, entitled "The Game of Life". The 23-year-old KWTX sportscaster in Waco had read an article by Jimmy Allen, a former athlete who became a Baptist preacher, and based his recording on the article which is also called "The Game of Life". The event is based on a full-length match, between the forces of good and evil, with Jesus Christ and Satan coaching the two teams. McCracken was familiar with play-by-play broadcasting, having created virtual baseball games for radio broadcast based on wire reports. McCracken originally presented "The Game of Life" on Sunday nights, at various churches around the central Texas area. Everywhere he presented "The Game of Life", he got requests for copies. Eventually, he had a short run of records pressed to offer at churches where he spoke. The fictional radio station in the recording has the call letters "WORD", which was printed on the label of the custom record. After being asked by a friend when he was going to release a follow-up, McCracken then decided to pursue the label on a more serious level.

Subsequent records focused on other spoken word recordings, but Word soon branched out into southern gospel music. Early employees for the label included Tom Norfleet, Kurt Kaiser and Ralph Carmichael.

The label struggled initially until Marvin Norcross became an equity partner. By 1954, Word had become a publishing house as well.

Several subsidiary labels were started over the years: Canaan Records in the 1960s, Myrrh Records in 1972, DaySpring Records in 1977, and Rejoice Records in the 1980s. Two of these labels no longer exist in their original form. The Myrrh label was resurrected in 2005, as a praise and worship record label, Myrrh Worship. Canaan Records was also re-opened in early 2007, with Dave Clark at the helm.

Larry Norman's Solid Rock Records had a distribution deal with Word, from 1975 to 1980. Artists on Solid Rock included Norman, Randy Stonehill, Daniel Amos, Tom Howard and Mark Heard.

In 1983, Chris Christian signed a distribution deal, to move his label Home Sweet Home Records from Benson Records to Word Records. It is still active, and remains under the independent ownership of Chris Christian.

Light Records was distributed in the 1970s by Word Records, before being sold to Ralph Carmichael in the 1980s.

Reunion Records signed a distribution and promotion contract in the 1980s. The agreement lasted well into the 1990s. Today, Reunion Records is distributed through Provident Label Group.

Star Song Communications was distributed by Word Records, but left their distribution deal in the late 1980s to sign with Sparrow Records, which was taken over by Chordant Distribution and then by EMI.

Distribution deals with other labels in the 1970s, 1980s and early 1990s allowed Word Records to rise to the top, virtually housing a who's-who in Christian music. They distributed, promoted and advertised the biggest names in contemporary Christian music. Artists included: Amy Grant, Michael W. Smith, Rich Mullins, Russ and Tori Taff, Benny Hester, Paul Smith, the Imperials, Petra, Helen Baylor, Sandi Patti, Kenny Marks, Wayne Watson, Carman, the Archers featuring Steve Archer, White Heart, Gaither Vocal Band, Bill Gaither Trio, Point of Grace, Love Song, Sweet Comfort Band, the Nelons, Happy Goodman Family featuring Rusty Goodman, Florida Boys, Guardian, Phil and Brenda Nicholas and other artists.

In the 1976, McCracken sold part interest in his label to the American Broadcasting Company. 10 years later, ABC merged with Capital Cities/ABC, Inc. and forced McCracken out of the company.

From 1984 to 1990, Word was distributed in the general market by A&M Records, and then by Epic Records until 2002.

In 1992, Capital Cities/ABC sold Word to Thomas Nelson, Inc. for $72 million, and Nelson made two major changes—developing the present swirling "W" logo for book products which was unveiled in 1995. Headquarters moved from Waco, Texas, to its present headquarters in Nashville, Tennessee. Nelson split the record label and book publishing arms in 1996, when the labels were sold to Gaylord Entertainment. In an agreement with Gaylord, Thomas Nelson continued to use the "Word Publishing" name for its book imprint until 2002, at which time it became "W Publishing Group" and retained the swirling "W" logo. A highly controversial ad campaign introduced at the CBA convention in 2002, created litigation and settled later.

After Colin Reed took over Gaylord Entertainment in 2001, the hotelier made corporate changes at the company, including the ousting of longstanding president Roland Lundy. The Word Entertainment group was sold to then-AOL Time Warner in 2002. That same year, former Atlantic Records Christian division manager Barry Landis briefly took the position of president of the label group division. Word went through a period of restructuring, closing their Los Angeles music publishing office, absorbing Myrrh Records, Squint Entertainment, and Everland Entertainment into the Word Label Group, and reducing in-house staff. Curb Records also gained a stake in the company during this time. In 2004, the company was sold again as part of Time Warner divestiture of its music division, selling it to a group of investors led by Edgar Bronfman Jr. to form a newly independent Warner Music Group.

In March 2016, it was announced that Mike Curb acquired 100% of Word Entertainment (excluding the print music division) from Warner Music Group. However, WMG has continued to distribute Word's output for the general market. The print music division (Word Music and Church Resources), excluding Word Publishing, was subsequently acquired by The Lorenz Corporation in February 2017.

== Artist roster ==
This is a list of artists, past and present, who have recorded for Word Records over the past several decades:

=== Current ===
- Meredith Andrews
- About a Mile
- Chris August
- For King & Country
- Francesca Battistelli
- Big Daddy Weave
- Blanca
- Jason Castro
- Everfound
- Family Force 5 (changed name to FF5)
- Group 1 Crew
- Dara Maclean
- Needtobreathe
- Point of Grace
- Sidewalk Prophets
- Stars Go Dim
- We Are Messengers
- Zealand Worship

=== Former ===
- 4Him
- Across the Sky
- The Alwyn Wall Band
- Dick Anthony
- The Archers
- Bob Ayala
- Wendy Bagwell and the Sunliters
- Bash-n-the-Code
- Helen Baylor
- Charles Billingsley
- Caroline Bonnett
- Dave Boyer
- Calvin Bridges
- Scott Wesley Brown
- Anita Bryant
- Building 429
- Shirley Caesar
- Steve Camp
- Carman
- Bruce Carroll
- Johnny Cash
- The Cathedrals
- Patrick Ryan Clark
- Ashley Cleveland
- Denny Correll
- Clay Crosse
- Billy Ray Cyrus
- Dakota Motor Co
- Dana
- Dion Dimucci
- Dove
- Downhere
- Bryan Duncan
- O'landa Draper and the Associates
- David Edwards
- John Elefante
- Joe English (musician)
- Evie
- Fireworks
- John Fischer
- The Florida Boys
- Richie Furay
- Gaither Vocal Band
- John Gimenez
- Terri Gibbs
- Happy Goodman Family
- Amy Grant
- Lilly Green
- Bruce Greer
- Guardian
- The Hawaiians
- Benny Hester
- Bruce Hibbard
- Dallas Holm
- Holm, Sheppard, & Johnson
- Holy Soldier
- Honeytree
- The Hoppers
- The Imperials
- Wanda Jackson
- JC & the Boyz
- J.C. Crew
- Troy Johnson
- Anita Kerr
- Wes King
- The Kingsmen
- Rachael Lampa
- The Lefevres
- Mylon LeFevre & Broken Heart
- Solveig Leithaug
- The Lewis Family
- Liberation Suite
- Love & the Outcome
- LoveWar
- Mark Lowry
- Kenny Marks
- Sarah Masen
- Babbie Mason
- Ken Medema
- David Meece
- Bobby Michaels
- Mighty Clouds of Joy
- Julie Miller
- Cindy Morgan (singer)
- The Mercy River Boys
- Morning Chapel Hour Choir
- David Mullen (singer)
- Rich Mullins
- The Nelons
- Tom Netherton
- Newsong
- Michael Omartian
- The Pat Terry Group
- Sandi Patti
- Leon Patillo
- Petra
- David Phelps
- Leslie Phillips
- Don Potter
- pureNRG
- Rachel Rachel
- Kelli Reisen
- Remedy Drive
- Salvador
- Mark Schultz
- Servant (band)
- George Beverly Shea
- Sixpence None the Richer
- Janet Lynn Skinner
- Chris Sligh
- Paul Smith
- Michael W. Smith
- Stellar Kart
- Joni Eareckson Tada
- Russ Taff
- Randy Travis
- Jaci Velasquez
- Veridia
- Greg X. Volz
- Sheila Walsh
- Mike Warnke
- Ethel Waters
- Wayne Watson
- Scott Wenzel
- Kelli Williams
- Daniel Winans (Rejoice Records/Word)

== See also ==
- List of Christian record labels
