= First Call =

Christian Music Trio

- Origin: Nashville, Tennessee
- Genres: Contemporary Christian music
- Past members: Marty McCall; Bonnie Keen; Mel Tunney; Marabeth Jordan
- Website: firstcallmusic.org

First Call was an American contemporary Christian music (CCM) group, consisting of Mel Tunney, Marty McCall, and Bonnie Keen. During their career spanning more than 30 years, the group worked with many noted producers and arrangers including David Maddux, Steven V. Taylor, Dan Keen, Greg Nelson, Keith Thomas, Neal Joseph, Wayne Kirkpatrick, Phil Naish and Darrell Brown.

== Group history ==
In the 1970s, McCall was a producer, songwriter, and background vocalist prior to forming the band Fireworks, Keen was pursuing a career in musical theater, and Tunney was solidly ensconced in the burgeoning contemporary Christian music industry following a stint touring with the group, Truth. The three met while working as backup vocalists for other recording artists and commercial jingles, and soon formed a friendship. Recognizing the benefit of marketing themselves as a ready-made trio for backup vocals and other studio recordings, and having developed a reputation for delivering pristine vocals in a variety of styles, they were considered the "first call" by music producers—the first choice for studio work. The term corresponded with their Christian faith, and the vocal band had their name.

None of the three initially foresaw a recording or touring career. As a side project to their backing-vocal careers, they agreed to record an a cappella Christmas album called An Evening in December (1985). The album sold well in the Contemporary Christian market, and the trio was offered the opportunity to accompany five-time Grammy Award-winning Christian vocalist Sandi Patty on her 150-city "Let There Be Praise" tour. Their first album of non-Christmas music, Undivided (1986), was followed by Something Takes Over (1987) and God Is Good (1989). The two Christmas music collections, An Evening in December Volume I (1985) and Volume II (1987), have long been bestsellers in the group's catalog. Many comparisons have been made to the group's style similarity to the recording group The Manhattan Transfer.

Tunney left the group amicably in 1990 to join her husband, Dick Tunney, in their own concert and songwriting ministry, while maintaining her friendship with McCall and Keen. Vocalist and session singer Marabeth Jordan joined McCall and Keen, and the trio continued performing and recording, producing two more successful albums, Human Song (1992) and Sacred Journey (1993). On the cusp of signing the largest record contract of their career in 1994, it was revealed that Jordan had been involved in an extra-marital affair with fellow CCM artist Michael English. The ensuing publicity had a devastating personal and professional effect on the group and the individuals involved. First Call lost their record deal, Jordan left the group and English returned his six recently awarded Dove Awards to the Gospel Music Association, and had his recording contract dissolved.

McCall and Keen decided to continue recording together as First Call, and signed with Warner Alliance for two more albums, a Christmas project, Beyond December, in 1995, followed their eponymously titled album First Call in 1996. Although First Call did not formally disband, McCall and Keen each pursued solo projects and other ministry opportunities. McCall released his solo effort Images of Faith (1997) on Warner Alliance and Keen released Marked for Life (1999) on Spring Hill Records. The three original members continued to perform together for reunion concerts, and were a featured artist on the 2015 CCM United We Will Stand concert.

McCall, Keen and Tunney reunited in 2005 to record a hymns collection for Discovery House Music called Rejoice. The CD released in 2006. Ten years later, First Call released a six-song EP, appropriately entitled Second Birth.

Marty McCall served for 16 years as Worship Pastor and Director of the Worship Department at McLean Bible Church, a Washington, DC area mega church. In addition to his role in First Call, McCall is a worship consultant and a creator of online resources for worship leaders, teams and singers.

Bonnie Keen continues to work as a recording artist, Emmy-nominated actor, and author, having penned three non-fiction titles, Blessed Are the Desperate, God Loves Messy People, and A Ladder Out of Depression.

Mel Tunney, along with her husband Dick, joined the staff of First Baptist Church of Columbia, Tennessee in 2006, serving first as interim worship leaders then as worship leaders/artists in residence. Mel joined the staff of The Church at Woodbine, a regional campus of Brentwood Baptist Church, in the fall of 2015.

== Awards ==
First Call won a Grammy Award for their contribution to the 1996 compilation project, Tribute: The Songs of Andrae Crouch. The group was a recipient of GMA Dove Awards in the "Group of the Year" category for both 1988 and 1989. They also have multiple Grammy nominations.

== Discography ==
Year	Album	Members Who Performed	Record label
1985	An Evening in December	Keen, McCall, Tunney	Word
1986	Undivided	Keen, McCall, Tunney	Word
1987	An Evening in December, Vol. 2	Keen, McCall, Tunney	Dayspring/Word
1987	Somethin' Takes Over	Keen, McCall, Tunney	Dayspring/Word
1989	God Is Good	Keen, McCall, Tunney	Dayspring/Word
1992	Human Song	Keen, McCall, Jordan	Myrrh/Word/Epic
1993	Sacred Journey	Keen, McCall, Jordan	Myrrh/Word/Epic
1994	La Razón de Cantar	Keen, McCall, Jordan	Myrrh/Word/Epic
1995	The Early Years	Keen, McCall, Tunney	Myrrh/Word
1995	Beyond December	Keen, McCall	Warner Alliance
1996	First Call	Keen, McCall	Warner Bros.
2006	Rejoice	Keen, McCall, Tunney	Discovery House
2007	First Call: The Definitive Collection	Keen, McCall, Tunney	Word
2016	Second Birth	Keen, McCall, Tunney	First Call

=== Appearances on other albums ===
- 1988 Prism: Red (Reunion Records) "If You're Happy And You Know It"
- 1989 Our Hymns (Word) "O Sacred Head, Now Wounded"
- 1990 Our Christmas (Word) "Angels We Have Heard on High"
- 1990 Handel's Young Messiah (Word) "Every Valley Shall Be Exalted"
- 1992 Wings of Victory - Glen Campbell (New Haven)
- 1993 Breakaway Praise 2 (Joyful Heart) "I Wanna Thank You Lord," "I Love You Lord"
- 1993 The New Young Messiah (Sparrow Records) "Rejoice Greatly, O Daughter of Zion"
- 1993 David T. Clydesdale presents One Special Christmas (Word) "We Need A Little Christmas (Medley)"
- 1996 Tribute: The Songs of Andraé Crouch (Word) "Can't Nobody Do Me Like Jesus"
- 1997 The Dan Oxley Praise Band (Brentwood Records) "Bless The Lord"
- 1998 Artists Acappella - The Signature Songs (Here to Him Music) "Undivided"
- 2004 Hands Lifted High: Classic Worship Songs with Dennis Jernigan & Friends (Shepherd's Heart Music) "Who Can Satisfy My Soul"
- 2005 Pressing On: Songs Inspired by the Journey of the Apostle Paul (Discovery House Music) "Three Days Blind," "Living Sacrifices," "Nothing Can Separate Us"
