= Myrrh Records =

American record label

- Original logo
- Parent company: Word Entertainment
- Founded: 1972
- Genre: Contemporary Christian
- Country of origin: United States

Myrrh Records (also known as Myrrh Worship) was an American Christian music record label.

According to Encyclopedia of American Gospel Music, the label was instrumental in developing a popular following for contemporary Christian music, as the label that first published music by: Barry McGuire, 2nd Chapter of Acts, Randy Matthews and Nancy Honeytree. The label is also known for serving as the first label for popular Christian crossover singer Amy Grant, who joined the label in 1977. She stayed with Myrrh until 1999, and with Word Records until 2005.

The label has released recordings by Al Green, B.J. Thomas, Benny Hester, Billy Preston, Bob Ayala, The Choir, Cliff Richard, Crystal Lewis, Dakoda Motor Company, David and the Giants, GLAD, Jaci Velasquez, David Meece, Malcolm and Alwyn, Mark Heard, Michael and Stormie Omartian, Mike Warnke,Miss Angie, Maria Muldaur, One Bad Pig, Petra, Phil Keaggy, Greg X. Volz, Randy Matthews, Randy Stonehill, Richie Furay, Earth, Wind & Fire singer Philip Bailey, Leslie Phillips, Servant, Steve Archer, Steve Camp, Steve Taylor, Sheila Walsh, and The 77s.

The label began as Myrrh Records in 1972, but took a five-year hiatus beginning in 2000, before being restarted by parent company Word Entertainment under the name Myrrh Worship in 2005. In 2014, the name was changed to Word Worship, again retiring the Myrrh name.

The first four albums released by Myrrh Records were Day By Day by Vonda Kay Van Dyke, All I Am Is What You See... by Randy Matthews, and the self-titled albums by Crimson Bridge and Dust.

== See also ==
- List of record labels
