= Eyes Open =

Eyes Open may refer to:

== Music ==
- Eyes Open (Youssou N'Dour album), 1992
- Eyes Open (Snow Patrol album), 2006
  - Eyes Open Tour, concert tour in support of the album by Snow Patrol
- "Eyes Open" (song), a 2012 song by Taylor Swift
- "Eyes Open", song featuring Twista from 13 (Havoc album)
- "Eyes Open", song by Gossip from Standing in the Way of Control
- "Eyes Open", song by Wolfmother from deluxe edition of Cosmic Egg

== Television ==
- "Eyes Open", a season 4 episode of Burn Notice
- "Eyes Open", a series 11 episode of the UK medical soap opera Doctors

== See also ==
- Eye Opener (disambiguation)
- Eyes Wide Open (disambiguation)
- Open Your Eyes (disambiguation)
- "Open Eyes", song by Saliva from Survival of the Sickest (album)
