= Eye Opener =

Eye Opener or Eyeopener may refer to:

== Newspapers ==
- The Eyeopener, a weekly student newspaper of the Toronto Metropolitan University Toronto, Canada published by Rye-Eye Publishing Inc.
- The Eye Opener, a Socialist Party of America newspaper published in Chicago
- Calgary Eye Opener, an early-1900s Canadian newspaper founded by Bob Edwards

== Television ==
- Eye Opener (Canadian TV series), a 1965 experimental drama television series
- Eye Opener (American TV program), a 2011–2017 syndicated morning news program
- "Eye Opener", a segment on the Philippine series Eye to Eye

== Other uses ==
- Eyeopener, a British dance music group
- Eye Opener, a 2018 book by Dag Palovic
- Eye Opener, a rapid on the Cossatot River, Arkansas, US
- "The Eye Opener!", a marketing catchphrase for Coast soap
- Another name for a hair of the dog, an alcoholic drink taken to mitigate the effects of a hangover

== See also ==
- Eyes Open (disambiguation)
- Eyes Wide Open (disambiguation)
- Open Your Eyes (disambiguation)
- i-Opener
