= Christin Hinojosa =

American actress (born 1975)

Christin Hinojosa (married name Kirschenbaum; born October 3, 1976) is an American former actress best known for her role as Sabrina in Dazed and Confused. After a few other small roles in films and on television, Hinojosa left acting in the late 1990s and became an anti-war activist. In 2004, as a member of the American Friends Service Committee, she was the first coordinator of the Eyes Wide Open installation in Chicago. She currently works as Director of Communications for Solidarity Bridge, a Christian medical charity focused on Latin America.

== Filmography ==
- Dazed and Confused (1993) – Sabrina Davis
- Roseanne and Tom: Behind the Scenes (1994) (TV) – Jennifer
- The Computer Wore Tennis Shoes (1995) (TV) – Penelope
- Pride & Joy – "Brenda's Secret" (1995) (TV) – Laughing Nanny
- Clueless (1996) (TV) – Lillia
- The Love Bug (1997) (TV) – Trendy Gal
