= Pilot (Friday Night Lights) =

- Friday Night Lights episode
- Episode no.: Season 1 Episode 1
- Directed by: Peter Berg
- Written by: Peter Berg
- Cinematography by: David Boyd
- Original air date: October 3, 2006

Episode chronology
← Previous —	Next → "Eyes Wide Open"

"Pilot" is the first episode of the sports drama television series Friday Night Lights. The episode premiered on the NBC network on October 3, 2006. It introduces the men and women involved with the Dillon Panthers, a Texas high school football team. In the pilot episode, the team is preparing for the first game of the season, which will be the first game under new head coach Eric Taylor.

The show is based on the 2004 film Friday Night Lights, which was in turn based on the 1990 non-fiction book Friday Night Lights: A Town, a Team, and a Dream by H. G. Bissinger. Peter Berg, who is Bissinger's cousin and who directed the film, wrote and directed the pilot episode, and served as executive producer for the series. While some of the actors from the movie returned to act on the show, most of the actors were cast specifically for the television series.

Critical reception of the show was good to average, with a general appreciation for the realistic portrayal of the American middle class. Generally speaking, however, there were serious doubts about whether the show would be able to stay on the air very long, though it has since gone on to complete five seasons. The episode's viewership of just over seven million was characterized as disappointing, though it did relatively well among men aged 18 to 34.

== Plot ==
It is Monday morning, and five days until the first game of the season for high school football team Dillon Panthers. While coach Eric Taylor is surveying the field, some of the players are getting ready for practice. Fullback Tim Riggins is recovering from a hangover, and his brother Billy warns him that he could be kicked off the team if he does not show. Meanwhile, second-string quarterback Matt Saracen is preparing lunch for his grandmother, before his friend Landry Clarke drives him to practice. At the stadium, a television crew is conducting interviews. It is revealed that coach Taylor, who has recently been made head coach, used to coach the exceptionally gifted quarterback Jason Street. It also becomes clear that there is a deep-seated conflict between Tim Riggins and the brash and loud-mouthed running back Brian "Smash" Williams. Later, at the local fast food restaurant where the players regularly hang out, Landry and Matt try to approach the coach's daughter Julie. She insists that she does not associate with football players. They assure her that Landry is not on the team and Matt gets virtually no playing time because of Street, but she still rebuffs them both.

The main cast of Friday Night Lights

On Tuesday night a pep rally is held at the local car dealership. The owner and host is Buddy Garrity, who is also the father of Jason Street's girlfriend Lyla. Coach Taylor is surrounded by members of the local community questioning him about the game. It is gradually emerging how important football is to the town, and the great responsibility that rests on Taylor's shoulders. His wife Tami, meanwhile, is reluctantly recruited by the society wives to join their book club. Riggins' girlfriend Tyra Collette tries to stoke up trouble by flirting with both Street and Smash. Wednesday goes by with a team visit to a group of elementary school football players who idolize the older boys. The two teams recite the Lord's Prayer together. On Thursday night, the night before the game, Street and Riggins are at a party. Riggins lays out his plan of Street going to the National Football League and Riggins living off one percent of Street's salary. Then they can retire to a ranch where Riggins will act as Street's caretaker. They make a toast to "Texas Forever".

On game night, coach Taylor gives a pep talk where he warns the players against taking the opponents – Westerby High School – too lightly. They say their rallying cry, "Clear Eyes, Full Hearts, Can't Lose!" and enter the field. The first half is problematic for the Panthers, and at the end of the second half, the visitors make a potentially game-winning interception. Street is the only one left to make a tackle. He succeeds, but the tackle is so hard that he remains prone on the ground. The crowd is left in silence as the starting quarterback does not move, and has to be taken off on a stretcher to a waiting ambulance. Coach Taylor now has to put in the highly unprepared Saracen, who initially makes several silly mistakes. The coach tells him to relax and focus, and Saracen manages to connect with Smash, who scores a touchdown. Riggins recovers the ensuing onside kick for the Panthers. In the final seconds of the game, Saracen throws a long pass to a receiver, who makes it to the end zone for another touchdown. As the Panthers win the game, both teams gather at mid-field to pray for Jason Street. Team members then head over to the hospital, where Street's condition is still unclear. Riggins and Smash reconcile, while Julie tries to comfort Lyla. In a voice-over, coach Taylor is heard saying that "We are all vulnerable, and we will all at some point in our lives fall."

== Production ==
=== Conception ===
The television series Friday Night Lights was based on the 2004 movie Friday Night Lights, which was in turn based on the 1990 non-fiction book Friday Night Lights: A Town, a Team, and a Dream by H. G. Bissinger. The book describes the 1988 season of the Permian Panthers, a high school football team in Odessa, Texas. While the movie was set in 1988, the television series takes place in the present. Peter Berg – who is Bissinger's cousin – co-wrote and directed the movie, and also wrote and directed the Friday Night Lights pilot. In addition to writing the script of the pilot, he also executively produced the entire project together with Sarah Aubrey and John Cameron.

Berg expressed regret in interviews about having to sacrifice certain story lines in the movie, due to time restraints. The television series allowed interpersonal issues to be addressed more in depth. "The idea was to create a television show that exists as much more of a soap opera, or an exploration of human beings," said Berg in an interview, "than as a chronicle of a football team's pursuit of glory." The series was filmed partly in Austin, and a call went out for local football players to play part roles in the show. In an attempt to maintain an authentic Texas environment, elements were incorporated from local society. Football scenes were filmed at the local Pflugerville High School's Kuempel Stadium and at the RRISD Complex, while uniforms were based on those of real-life Pflugerville Panthers.

=== Casting ===
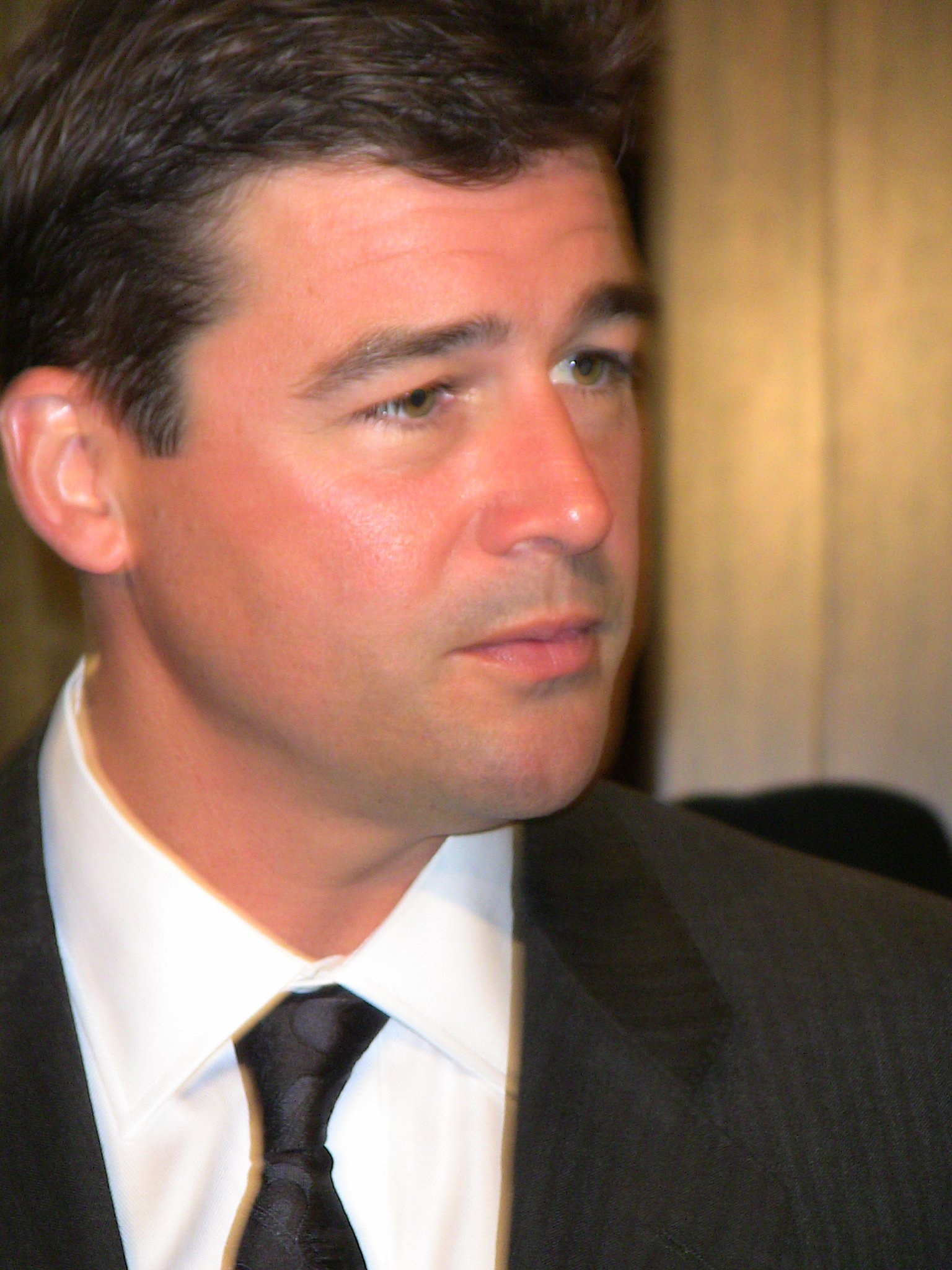
Kyle Chandler, cast as coach Eric Taylor, was advised to give his character a haggard look.

Casting of the show included using some of the actors who had already appeared in the movie, including Brad Leland as Buddy Garrity, a character similar to the one he had played in the movie, and Connie Britton as Tami Taylor, wife of coach Eric Taylor. Britton had felt that the female story lines were underplayed in the movie, but was promised by Berg that these topics would be given more attention in the television series. Kyle Chandler, playing the role of head coach Eric Taylor, said he had played some high school football, "but I was no good". He recalled showing up to an early meeting with Berg after a friend's party where he "had too much to drink, smoked too many cigarettes" and was generally quite tired. Berg liked that look, since he wanted the coach to appear old and weary. "You need to drink a lot of scotch and smoke a lot of cigarettes," he advised.

Scott Porter, playing the role of quarterback Jason Street, knew that his character would be paralyzed from the first episode on, and said that this was a big part of the reason why he took the role. Porter played high school football as a wide receiver. He also played on a highly successful team in high school, and described himself as huge fan of the Friday Night Lights movie. Meanwhile, Taylor Kitsch, the show's Tim Riggins, said in an interview that he was able to relate to his character based on his own personal experiences: "my father is out of my life, more or less", he revealed in an interview, "So I discover stuff that maybe I wasn't even dealing with as a person."

Zach Gilford said about his character Matt Saracen that "there are different parts of it from people I know growing up or people I'm tight with now". He credited Peter Berg with coming up with the Saracen character, and said he was grateful to "have some of the most realistic and heartfelt storylines." When asked which of the actors would have been drafted highest by the NFL, he replied "Probably Taylor [Kitsch]. He's a good athlete, but Scott will kill me for saying that. Scott played football growing up and he has a good arm, but Taylor is faster and I think that would help his draft status." Gaius Charles, who plays "Smash" Williams, graduated from the Carnegie Mellon School of Drama in 2005, determined to find a job within a year, which he did with Friday Night Lights. He describes himself as "all right" at football, but says that he was taken aback by the intensity of the plays on the set.

Mack Brown, the head coach of the University of Texas at Austin Longhorn football team, plays a cameo in the episodes. He appears in the pep rally scene, where he is a member of the local community questioning coach Taylor. Brown played without a script because, according to Berg, "you've heard fathers for 33 years, so you ought to know what to say." Kyle Chandler, as coach Taylor, was reportedly surprised by Brown's intensity.

== Reception ==
Lisa de Moraes, in her "TV Column" for The Washington Post, pointed out that in spite of critical praise, the show's premiere did poorly with viewers. With 7.17 million viewers, it had "the worst ratings performance for any series premiere in the official 2006-07 TV season." On the other hand, Cynthia Fuchs of PopMatters wrote that the episode's good performance among the coveted demographic of men aged 18 to 34 could be a saving grace. The episode was nominated for an Artios Award for "Best Dramatic Pilot Casting". Casting director Linda Lowy was the nominee for the award, which was won by the series Brothers & Sisters for the episode "Patriarchy".

The pilot of Friday Night Lights received good to middling reviews. Virginia Heffernan of The New York Times gave the episode a very good review, and suggested the series could be good enough to transcend the medium of television. She praised the "intelligent performances" of the actors, and though she found the "Smash" Williams character less convincing than the others, she thought it improved towards the end. She also appreciated the use of audio to tell the story: the buzz of a surgeon's saw or the sound of skin stuck to leather. Keith Phipps of The A.V. Club, wrote "I appreciate the feel for the high stakes attached to small-market school sports, the knowing take on the high-school caste system, and the details of family life." Still, he worried that America was "failing to fall in love with" the show, and expressed doubts as to whether it would be allowed to survive.

Henry Goldblatt, writing for Entertainment Weekly, gave the episode a grade B. He accused the show of abandoning the "racial diversity and the gritty poverty" of the film, but still allowed that Peter Berg had "kept the thrust". The Matt Saracen character was singled out as particularly promising. While positively contrasting the show with other teen-age dramas like One Tree Hill, Goldblatt also had doubts about its staying power. Variety's Brian Lowry called the show "Earnest, beautifully shot and perhaps more organically religious than anything else in primetime". Still, he felt the show was "like one of those family programs middle America and conservatives pine for that too few of them actually bother to watch". He pointed out that the show had to compete with both House and Dancing With the Stars, among women as well as men, in order to survive. The Washington Post critic Tom Shales called the show "Extraordinary in just about every conceivable way," particularly emphasising the quality of the cast. Shales did have issues with the documentary style of show's camera movements, but still thought it could be the "best new drama series of the season".
