= Head East (album) =

Studio album by Head East
- Released: February 1978
- Recorded: January 1978
- Studio: The Record Plant
- Genre: Hard rock
- Length: 37:18
- Label: A&M
- Producer: Jeffrey Lesser

Head East chronology
Gettin' Lucky (1977)	Head East (1978)	Head East Live! (1979)

Singles from Head East
- 1. "Since You Been Gone" Released: 1978

Head East (also known as The Roadsign Album) is the fourth studio album by the American hard rock band Head East. Released by A&M Records in February 1978, it was the group's fourth album to crack the Billboard 200, peaking at #78. The album also produced the band's highest-charting single, a cover of the Russ Ballard song "Since You Been Gone", which reached #46 on the Billboard Hot 100. The band toured in support of the album.

Professional ratings
Review scores
Source	Rating
AllMusic	4/5 stars
Billboard	(unrated)
Cash Box	(unrated)
Record World	(unrated)

The album has since been reissued on CD and as an MP3 download.

== Track listing ==
1. "Open Up the Door” (Steve Huston)
2. "Man I Wanna Be" (Mike Somerville)
3. "Nothing to Lose" (Dan Birney)
4. "Since You Been Gone" (Russ Ballard)
5. "Pictures" (Huston)
6. "Get Up & Enjoy Yourself" (John Schlitt)
7. "I'm Feelin' Fine" (Roger Boyd)
8. "Dance Away Lover" (Schlitt)
9. "Elijah" (Charles Sabatino)

== Charts ==
Chart (1978)	Peak position
Canada Top Albums/CDs (RPM)	98
US Billboard 200	78

== Personnel ==
- Roger Boyd - keyboards/vocals
- Steve Huston - drums/vocals
- Mike Somerville - guitar/vocals
- Dan Birney - bass
- John Schlitt - lead vocals
