= Don Phillips (casting director) =

American casting director and film producer (1940–2021)

- Born: December 21, 1940
- Died: November 25, 2021 (aged 80)
- Occupations: Casting director, film producer
- Spouse: Dorothy J. Pearl (died 2018)

Don Phillips (December 21, 1940 – November 25, 2021) was an American casting director and film producer. He was known for his casting directing work on the films Dog Day Afternoon, Animal House, Dazed and Confused, The Wild Life and The Game.

At the 94th Academy Awards, his name was mentioned in the In Memoriam section.
