= Head East =

American hard rock band

- Origin: St. Louis, MO / Carbondale, IL
- Genres: Hard rock, rock
- Years active: 1969–present
- Labels: A&M, Pyramid Records, Darkheart Records, Allegiance Records, Cleopatra Records
- Members: Roger Boyd; Eddy Jones; Greg Manahan; Mark Murtha; Darren Walker
- Past members: John Schlitt; Steve Huston; Mike Somerville; Dan Birney; Larry Boyd; Tony Gross; Dan Odom; Mark Boatman; Robbie Robinson; Kurt Hansen; J. Jaye Steele; Matt Stewart; Tom Bryant; Ricky Lynn Gregg; Glen Bridger; Mark J Kozlowski

Head East is an American rock band from Illinois. The band was formed by singer John Schlitt, guitarist Danny Piper, keyboardist Roger Boyd, bassist Larry Boyd, and drummer Steve Huston. They met and formed the band while Schlitt, Piper, and Boyd were studying at the University of Illinois and Huston was at Eastern Illinois University. Roger Boyd is the only remaining original member. The band achieved national notability with "Never Been Any Reason" in 1975.

== Background ==
Originally known as the TimeAtions, the band adopted the name Head East on August 6, 1969, at the suggestion of the band's roadie, Baxter Forrest Twilight. In a 2011 interview, founding member Huston claimed that soon after sunrise one morning in 1969, Twilight woke the band members in their communal home/practice facility. Having been up all night sitting in the front yard consuming acid, the roadie said that when the sun rose, it turned into a giant talking head and told him the band's new name should be "Head East". The band liked the unusual nature of it and kept the name.

== Career ==
Head East recorded and produced their first album, Flat as a Pancake, in 1974 at Golden Voice Recording Studio in South Pekin, Illinois. Released on their own record label, Pyramid Records, all 5,000 records and 500 eight-tracks produced were sold. Several midwest album rock radio stations, chief among them KSHE 95, St. Louis and KY-102 in Kansas City and others, began airing songs from the album as well. With those sales, and the song "Never Been Any Reason" on radio, A&M was impressed enough to sign the band and re-release the album in 1975. The album reached gold status by 1978 and would remain their most popular album, spawning another hit in the song "Love Me Tonight," which peaked at number 54.

The band followed with the albums Get Yourself Up and Gettin' Lucky, released in 1976 and 1977 respectively. The band's fourth album titled Head East (1978) produced another hit with the band's cover of former Argent singer Russ Ballard's "Since You Been Gone", which peaked at number 46.

In 1979, the band released the double-LP Head East Live!, and A Different Kind of Crazy. The former peaked at No. 96 on the US Hot 100 charts. The band performed on the soundtrack to the comic anthology film J-Men Forever. Head East performed at the Culver Academies graduation party in 1979, which in the prior years had been headlined by Styx and Quicksilver.

In March 1980, bassist Birney and guitarist Somerville left the band, while singer Schlitt was fired due to drug dependency. Once sober, he became a Christian and was lead singer of the Contemporary Christian Music band Petra.

Remaining members Boyd and Huston hired bassist Mark Boatman, guitarist Tony Gross, and drummer and singer Dan Odum to record their album U.S. 1, released in October 1980. The album was their last to reach the charts and last recorded release on A&M.

In 1982, Head East released Onward and Upward on Allegiance Records. Odum and Huston left the band in 1983, leaving Boyd as the only original member. Following a six-year hiatus from releasing new material, the band reappeared with the album Choice of Weapons (1988) on Dark Heart Records, featuring bassist Kurt Hansen, who joined the band in 1983, taking on primary lead vocal duties. Choice of Weapons remains the last Head East studio album consisting of new original material.

The band continued touring, performing in venues around the Midwest, with new vocalist/rhythm guitarist Randy Rickman joining shortly after the Choice of Weapons album and serving as co-lead vocalist with Hansen. Somerville returned to the band from 1994 to 2003.

In 1999, a live album titled Concert Classics Vol. 7 was released. The album featured songs from two shows at Denver's Rainbow Music Hall. The first five tracks are from a 1980 show featuring the original personnel, while the last 10 tracks are from a 1981 show featuring the latter line-up. The band tours with 30 to 40 shows each year.

=== Deaths of former band members ===
Former bassist and member of Head East's classic lineup, Birney died on August 9, 2003, of cardiovascular disease. Hanson died on December 16, 2003. Somerville died on February 28, 2020, at age 67. Huston died July 25, 2023, in Harris County, Texas, at age 73.

== In media ==
The band's 1975 single, "Never Been Any Reason", was featured in the 2005 movie adaptation of Clive Cussler's novel Sahara, and appears on the soundtrack to the 1993 film Dazed and Confused. The song was used on television shows That '70s Show and Friday Night Lights.

== Honors ==
In 2011, Head East was inducted into the Iowa Rock n' Roll Music Association's Hall of Fame. As part of the induction concert, several former and current members united onstage to perform, including Steve Huston and John Schlitt. In 2025, Head East was inducted into the Illinois Rock & Roll Hall of Fame.

== Band members ==
=== Current members ===
- Roger Boyd – keyboards (1969–present)
- Eddy Jones – drums, vocals (2006–present)
- Greg Manahan – bass guitar, guitar, vocals (2006–present)
- Darren Walker – lead vocals, occasional live bass guitar (2006–present)
- Mark Murtha – lead guitar, vocals (2022–present)

=== Former members ===
- Larry Boyd – bass (1969–1974)
- Steve Huston – drums, backing and lead vocals (1969–1973, 1974–1983)
- Dan Piper – lead guitar (1969–1972)
- John Schlitt – lead vocals (1969–1973, 1974–1980)
- Brad Flota – guitar (1972–1973)
- Bill Keister – drums (1973)
- Dale Innes – lead vocals (1973)
- Mike Somerville – guitar (1973–1980, 1995–2003)
- Dan Birney – bass (1974–1980, 1988 (guest appearance))
- Dan Odum – lead vocals (1980–1983)
- Mark Boatman – bass – (1980)
- Tony Gross – guitar (1980–1984, 1987–1991)
- Robbie Robinson – bass (1981–1983)
- Kurt Hansen – bass, lead vocals (1983–1997)
- J.Jaye Steele – lead vocals (1983–1986)
- Brian Kelly – drums (1983–1985)
- Ricky Lynn Gregg – guitar (1984–1986)
- Joel Parks – drums (1985–1987)
- Matt Stewart – guitar (1986–1987)
- Donnie Dobbins – drums (1987–1991)
- Randy Rickman – lead vocals, guitar (1988–1992)
- Steve Riker – drums (1991–1992)
- James Murphy – lead guitar (1991–1995)
- Tom Bryant – lead vocals (1995–2001)
- Dan Kelly – drums (1992–1997, 1999–2000)
- Rich Creadore – bass (1992–2006)
- Mike Mesey – drums (1997–1999, 2000–2006)
- Richie Callison – guitar, lead vocals (2001–2006)
- Glen Bridger – lead guitar, vocals (2006–2022)
- Jean Mullins - vocals (1971–1973)

== Discography ==
=== Studio albums ===
Year	Title	Chart peak positions	
Year	Title	US	CAN
1975	Flat as a Pancake	126	—
1976	Get Yourself Up	161	—
1977	Gettin' Lucky	136	—
1978	Head East	78	98
1979	A Different Kind of Crazy	96	—
1980	U.S. 1	137	—
1982	Onward and Upward	—	—
1988	Choice of Weapons	—	—
2013	Raise a Little Hell	—	—
2023	Full Circle	—	—
2026	Christmas with Head East and Friends	—	—
"—" denotes releases that did not chart.

=== Live albums ===
- 1979: Head East Live! – (number 65) (number 66 Can)
- 1999: Concert Classics Volume 7 – (none)
- 2000: Live on Stage (edited version of Head East Live) – (none)
- 2008: Head East Live 2008 – (none)
- 2011: One Night With... Head East – (none)

=== Compilation albums ===
- 2001: 20th Century Masters – (none)

=== Singles ===
Year	Title	Chart positions		Certifications	Album
Year	Title	US	CAN	Certifications	Album
1975	"Never Been Any Reason" b/w "One Against the Other"	68	—	RIAA: Gold	Flat as a Pancake
1975	"Love Me Tonight" b/w "Fly By Night Lady"	54	—		Flat as a Pancake
1976	"Fly By Night Lady" b/w "Separate Ways"	—	—		Get Yourself Up
1977	"Gettin' Lucky" b/w "Sands of Time"	—	—		Gettin' Lucky
1978	"Since You Been Gone" b/w "Pictures"	46	64		Head East
1979	"Never Been Any Reason" b/w "I'm Feelin' Fine"	—	—		Non-album single
1979	"Got to Be Real" b/w "Morning"	103	—		A Different Kind of Crazy
1979	"Specialty" b/w "Morning"	—	—		A Different Kind of Crazy
1980	"I Surrender" b/w "Out of the Blue"	—	—		U.S. 1
2024	"Hey, Santa Claus" "Zat You, Santa Claus?" "Please, Please, Please, Please, Please"	—	—		Non-album singles
2026	"Mama Let Him Play"	—	—		Non-album singles
2026	"Merry Xmas Everybody"	—	—		Christmas with Head East and Friends
"—" denotes a recording that did not chart or was not released in that territory.
