= Close Your Eyes =

Close Your Eyes may refer to:

== Music ==
- Close Your Eyes (band), an American melodic hardcore band
- Close Your Eyes (group), a South Korean boy group

=== Albums ===
- Close Your Eyes (Bic Runga album) or the title song, 2016
- Close Your Eyes (Glorium album), 1997
- Close Your Eyes (Kurt Elling album), 1995
- Close Your Eyes (Lionel Loueke album), 2018
- Close Your Eyes (Sarah McKenzie album), 2012
- Close Your Eyes (Stacey Kent album), 1997
- Close Your Eyes: A Collection 1965–1986, by Vincent Crane, 2008
- Close Your Eyes, or the title song (see below), by Edward Bear, 1973
- Close Your Eyes, by Ellie Drennan, 2015
- Close Your Eyes, an EP by Close Your Eyes, 2008

=== Songs ===
- "Close Your Eyes" (Bernice Petkere song), first recorded by Freddy Martin & His Orchestra, 1933; covered by many others
- "Close Your Eyes" (Carter and Tennent song), first recorded by Jack Hylton and his orchestra, 1931
- "Close Your Eyes" (Chuck Willis song), first recorded by The Five Keys, 1955; covered by many others, including Peaches & Herb (1967)
- "Close Your Eyes" (Edward Bear song), 1973
- "Close Your Eyes" (Parmalee song), 2014
- "Close Your Eyes (And Count to Fuck)", by Run the Jewels, 2014
- "Close Your Eyes", by Acen Razvi from 75 Minutes, 1994
- “Close Your Eyes”, by The All-American Rejects, 2017
- "Close Your Eyes", by Atomic Rooster from Made in England, 1972
- "Close Your Eyes", by Axium from Matter of Time, 2002
- "Close Your Eyes", by The Chemical Brothers from Push the Button, 2005
- "Close Your Eyes", by Dan + Shay from Where It All Began, 2014
- "Close Your Eyes", by Felix Jaehn, 2019
- "Close Your Eyes", by Juliana Hatfield from Beautiful Creature, 2000
- "Close Your Eyes", by Kim Petras from Turn Off the Light, Vol. 1, 2018
- "Close Your Eyes", by Lily Allen from Sheezus, 2014
- "Close Your Eyes", by The Lovin' Spoonful from Everything Playing, 1967
- "Close Your Eyes", by Meghan Trainor from Title, 2015
- "Close Your Eyes", by Michael Bublé from To Be Loved, 2013
- "Close Your Eyes", by Rhodes from Wishes, 2015
- "Close Your Eyes", by the String Cheese Incident from Outside Inside, 2001
- "Close Your Eyes", by Westlife from Coast to Coast, 2000
- "Close Your Eyes" (Buffy/Angel Love Theme), composed by Christophe Beck from Buffy the Vampire Slayer: The Album, 1999

== Film ==
- Close Your Eyes (2023 film), directed by Víctor Erice
- Doctor Sleep (2002 film), or Close Your Eyes, a 2002 film directed by Nick Willing

== Other uses ==
- "Close Your Eyes" (Fear the Walking Dead), a television episode
- Close Your Eyes, a 2018 Singaporean television series featuring Edwin Goh
- Close Your Eyes, a 2013 novel by Ewan Morrison

== See also ==
- Open Your Eyes (disambiguation)
- Eyelid
