= Eyes Wide Shut (disambiguation) =

Eyes Wide Shut is a 1999 film directed by Stanley Kubrick.

"Eyes Wide Shut" may also refer to:

- "Eyes Wide Shut" (song), a 2011 song by English boy band JLS
- "Eyes Wide Shut", a song by Canadian rap rock group Project Wyze from the 2001 album misfits.strangers.liars.friends
- "Eyes Wide Shut", a 2013 single by metalcore band Conquer Divide
- "Eyes Wide Shut", a song by English singer Billy Idol from the 2014 album Kings & Queens of the Underground
- "Eyes Wide Shut", a song by American metalcore band Myka Relocate from the 2015 album The Young Souls
- Eyes Wide Shut Recordings, a British record label whose acts include The Mission

== See also ==
- Eyes Wide Open (disambiguation)
