= Flat as a Pancake =

Studio album by Head East
- Released: 1975
- Recorded: 1974
- Studio: Golden Voice (South Pekin, Illinois)
- Genre: Hard rock
- Label: Pyramid (initial release), A&M Records (reissue)
- Producer: Roger Boyd

Head East chronology
Flat as a Pancake (1975)	Get Yourself Up (1976)

Professional ratings
Review scores
Source	Rating
AllMusic	3/5 stars

Flat as a Pancake is the debut studio album by American rock band Head East. The album was originally released independently by Pyramid Records. However, when radio stations began to play the song "Never Been Any Reason", A&M Records signed the band and re-released the album in June 1975. The album was certified gold on September 19, 1978, by the RIAA and is their only certified album. The album, which was recorded at the Golden Voice Studios in South Pekin, Illinois, is their most successful.

The diner photographed on the back cover of the A&M reissue is the Rite-Way Diner, still in operation (now as the Olivette Diner) at 9638 Olive Blvd, Olivette, Missouri.

== Track listing ==
1. "Never Been Any Reason" - 5:10 (Mike Somerville)
2. "One Against the Other" - 3:47 (John Schlitt)
3. "Love Me Tonight" - 4:27 (Mike Somerville)
4. "City of Gold" - 3:41 (Steve Huston)
5. "Fly By Night Lady" - 2:47 Steve Huston)
6. "Jefftown Creek" - 6:41 (Steve Huston)
7. "Lovin' Me Along" - 5:25 (Mike Somerville)
8. "Ticket Back to Georgia" - 4:02 (Steve Huston)
9. "Brother Jacob" - 3:10 (Steve Huston)

== Personnel ==
- John Schlitt - lead vocals
- Mike Somerville - guitar, backing vocals
- Roger Boyd — piano, organ, Moog, Mellotron, backing vocals
- Dan Birney - bass, guitar, backing vocals
- Steve Huston - drums, percussion, backing vocals

== Charts ==
Chart (1975)	Peak position
US Billboard 200	126

== Certifications ==
Region	Certification	Certified units/sales
United States (RIAA)	Gold	500,000^{^}
^{^} Shipments figures based on certification alone.
