= Gettin' Lucky =

Studio album by Head East
- Released: March 1977
- Recorded: 1976
- Genre: Hard rock
- Label: A&M
- Producer: Richard Podolor

Head East chronology
Get Yourself Up (1976)	Gettin' Lucky (1977)	Head East (1978)

Professional ratings
Review scores
Source	Rating
AllMusic	3/5 stars

Gettin' Lucky is an album by the American band Head East. It was released in 1977 on A&M Records. Along with Flat as a Pancake and Head East Live!, it is one of their most renowned releases. The album peaked at No. 136 on the Billboard pop albums chart.

The album was re-released together with Head East on CD as a double album.

== Track listing ==
1. "Gettin' Lucky" (Huston, Somerville)
2. "Back in My Own Hands" (Birney, Somerville)
3. "Show Me I'm Alive" (Birney)
4. "Take It On Home" (Huston)
5. "Dancer Road" (Birney)
6. "Don't Let Me Sleep in the Morning" (Somerville)
7. "Sands of Time" (R Boyd)
8. "Call to Arms and Legs" (L Boyd, Huston)
9. "Time Has a Way" (Huston)
10. "Every Little Bit of My Heart" (Boyd, Schlitt)

== Charts ==
Chart (1977)	Peak position
US Billboard 200	136

== Personnel ==
Head East

- John Schlitt — lead and backing vocals
- Mike Somerville — electric, acoustic and slide guitars, backing vocals; bass on "Gettin' Lucky"
- Roger Boyd — organ, piano, Moog and ARP string synthesizers, Mellotron, trumpet, melodica
- Dan Birney — bass on all tracks except for "Gettin' Lucky"
- Steve Huston — drums, backing and lead vocals

Additional personnel

- Richard Polodor — producer; electric guitar on "Gettin' Lucky", string arrangements on "Show Me I'm Alive", lead acoustic guitar on "Time Has A Way"
