= Dazed and Confused (film) =

1993 film by Richard Linklater

- Theatrical release poster
- Directed by: Richard Linklater
- Written by: Richard Linklater
- Produced by: Richard Linklater; Sean Daniel; James Jacks
- Cinematography: Lee Daniel
- Edited by: Sandra Adair
- Production companies: Alphaville; Detour Filmproduction
- Distributed by: Gramercy Pictures
- Release date: September 24, 1993
- Running time: 102 minutes
- Country: United States
- Language: English
- Budget: $6.9 million
- Box office: $8.2 million

Dazed and Confused is a 1993 American coming-of-age comedy film written and directed by Richard Linklater. The film follows a variety of teenagers on the last day of school in 1976. Although the film was shot in Austin, it was inspired by Linklater's time growing up in East Texas and no town name is ever given. The film has no single protagonist or central conflict; rather, it follows interconnected plot threads among different social groups and characters, such as rising ninth graders undergoing hazing rituals, a football star's refusal to sign a clean-living pledge for his coach, and various characters hanging out at a pool hall. The film features a large ensemble cast of actors who would later become stars, including Jason London, Ben Affleck, Matthew McConaughey, Milla Jovovich, Cole Hauser, Parker Posey, Adam Goldberg, Nicky Katt, Joey Lauren Adams, Rory Cochrane, and Anthony Rapp.

Linklater originally planned to make a teen film after his breakout feature Slacker. Slacker caught the attention of Universal Pictures producer Jim Jacks, who secured 6 million dollars for Linklater's next feature. Linklater drew heavily on his adolescence in Huntsville, Texas, to write the script, lifting the names of several people from his hometown for the characters. Most actors cast for the film were undiscovered talent, including McConaughey, who became the film's breakout star. Linklater shot the film around Austin, with several members of his crew from Slacker. The actors were encouraged to improvise and develop their own characters, with some writing in extra scenes. Linklater gathered several 1970s rock songs for the soundtrack, which made up a significant portion of the film's budget. The picture was marketed by Gramercy Pictures as a stoner film, to Linklater's dismay.

Released on September 24, 1993, Dazed and Confused was a commercial disappointment at the box office, grossing less than $8 million in the United States. The film later found success on the home video market and has since become a cult classic. It ranked third on Entertainment Weekly magazine's list of the 50 Best High School Movies. The magazine also ranked it 10th on its "Funniest Movies of the Past 25 Years" list. Reviewers have praised the film for its faithful and humanistic depiction of the setting and of high school life.

== Plot ==
On May 28, 1976, the last day of school at Lee High School in an unnamed Texas town, the next year's group of seniors commence annual hazing of junior high students that are to be freshmen in the next semester. Randall "Pink" Floyd, the school's star quarterback, is asked to sign a pledge promising not to take drugs during the summer or do anything that would "jeopardize the goal of a championship season".

When classes end, the incoming freshman boys are hunted down by the seniors and paddled. The incoming girls are rounded up in the school parking lot by senior girls (led by Darla), covered in mustard, ketchup, flour, and raw eggs, and forced to propose to senior boys.

As day fades to night, freshman Mitch Kramer escapes the initial hazing with his best friend Carl Burnett, but is later cornered after a baseball game and violently paddled. Fred O'Bannion, a senior participating in the hazing tradition for a second year after failing to graduate, delights in punishing Mitch. Pink gives the injured Mitch a ride home and offers to take him cruising with friends that night.

Plans for the evening are ruined when Kevin Pickford's parents discover his intention to host a keg party. Elsewhere, the intellectual trio of Cynthia Dunn, Tony Olson, and Mike Newhouse decides to participate in the evening's festivities. Pink and his friend David Wooderson, a man in his early 20s who still socializes with high school students, pick up Mitch and head for the Emporium, a pool hall frequented by teens.

As the night progresses, students loiter around the Emporium, listen to rock music, cruise the neighborhood, and frequent a local drive-through restaurant. Mitch is introduced to sophomore Julie Simms, with whom he shares a mutual attraction. While cruising again with Pink, Pickford, and Don Dawson, Mitch drinks beer and smokes marijuana for the first time.

After a game of mailbox baseball, a neighborhood resident brandishing a gun threatens to call the police. They barely escape after he fires at their car. After returning to the Emporium, Mitch runs into his middle school friends and hatches a plan with them to exact revenge on O'Bannion. The freshmen dump paint on him from a roof, causing him to leave in a rage. After the Emporium closes, an impromptu keg party is planned in a field under a moonlight tower.

Cynthia, Tony, and Mike arrive at their first keg party, where tough guy Clint Bruno threatens Mike. Tony runs into freshman Sabrina Davis, whom he met earlier during the hazing, and begins spending time with her. Mike, suffering from the humiliation of his confrontation with Clint, makes a stand by punching him. In return, he gets tackled by Clint and receives a beating. Pink and Wooderson break up the fight. Football player Benny O'Donnell confronts Pink about his refusal to sign the pledge. Pink, the only player not to have signed, believes it violates his individuality and beliefs.

Mitch leaves the keg party with Julie. They drive to a nearby hill overlooking town to make out. Tony gives Sabrina a ride home, and they kiss goodnight. As night turns to dawn, Pink, Wooderson, Don, Ron Slater, and several other friends decide to smoke marijuana on the 50-yard line of the football field, where Wooderson advises Pink to "keep livin'" without concern for what is expected of him.

The police arrive and, upon recognizing Pink and Don, call Coach Conrad, their football coach. Conrad lectures Pink about hanging out with "losers" and insists he sign the pledge. Pink says that he might play football, but he will not sign it, and leaves with Wooderson and Slater to travel to Houston to obtain tickets to an Aerosmith concert. Mitch arrives home after sunrise to find his mother has waited up for him. She decides against punishment, but warns him about coming home late again. Mitch goes to his bedroom, puts on headphones, and listens to "Slow Ride" by Foghat, as Pink, Wooderson, Slater, and Simone Kerr travel down a highway to purchase their tickets.

== Cast ==
- Jason London as Randall "Pink" Floyd
- Joey Lauren Adams as Simone Kerr
- Milla Jovovich as Michelle Burroughs
- Shawn Andrews as Kevin Pickford
- Rory Cochrane as Ron Slater
- Adam Goldberg as Mike Newhouse
- Anthony Rapp as Anthony "Tony" Olson
- Sasha Jenson as Don Dawson
- Marissa Ribisi as Cynthia Dunn
- Deena Martin as Shavonne Wright
- Michelle Burke as Jodi Kramer
- Cole Hauser as Benny O'Donnell
- Christine Harnos as Kaye Faulkner
- Wiley Wiggins as Mitch Kramer
- Mark Vandermeulen as Tommy Houston
- Esteban Powell as Carl Burnett
- Jeremy Fox as Hirschfelder
- Ben Affleck as Fred O'Bannion
- Jason O. Smith as Melvin Spivey
- Christin Hinojosa as Sabrina Davis
- Parker Posey as Darla Marks
- Matthew McConaughey as David Wooderson
- Catherine Avril Morris as Julie Simms
- Nicky Katt as Clint Bruno
- Renée Zellweger as Nesi White
- Kim Krizan as Ms. Stroud

== Production ==
=== Development ===
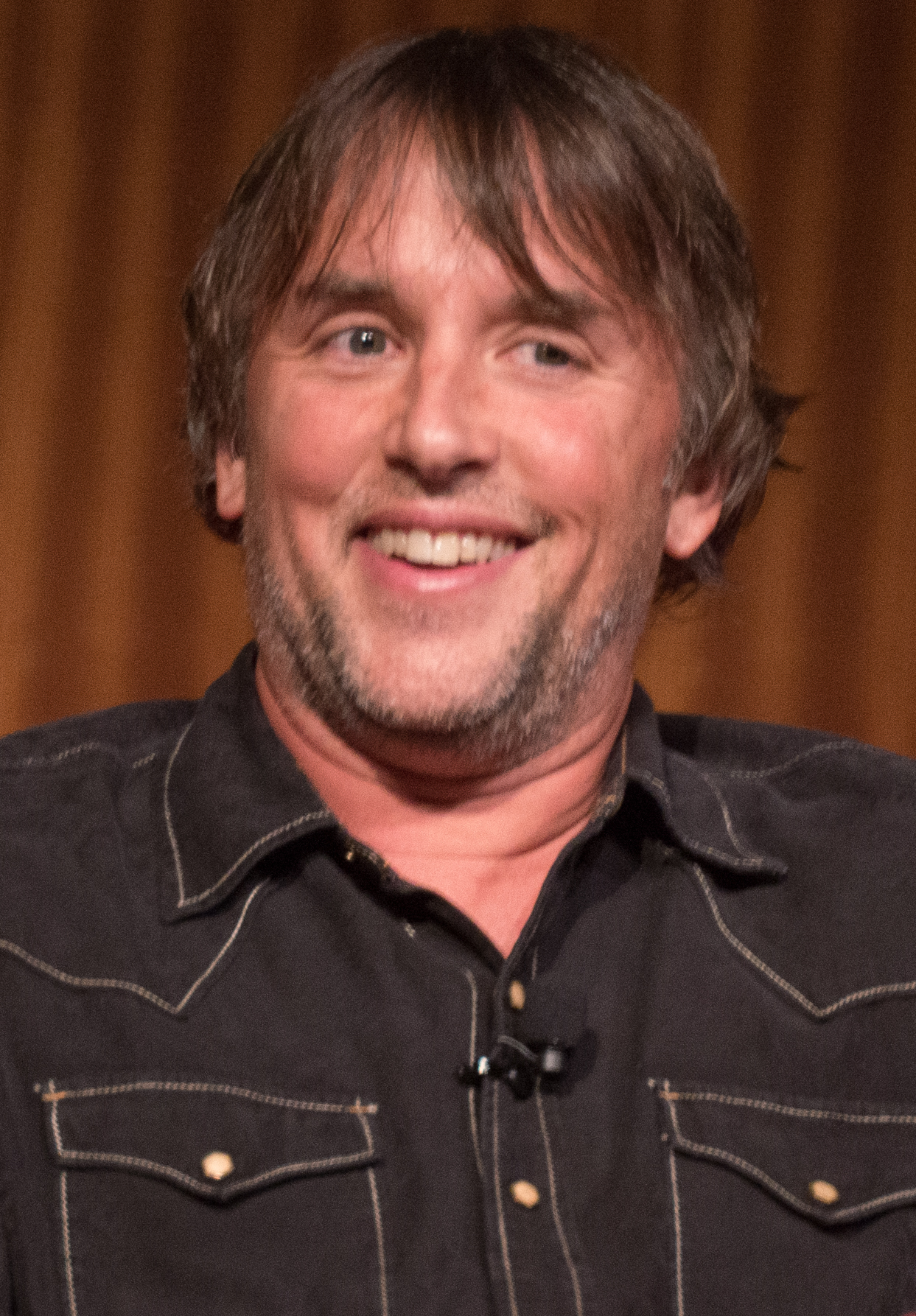
Dazed and Confused was director Richard Linklater's first studio production.

Director Richard Linklater's previous film, Slacker, caught the attention of Universal Pictures producer Jim Jacks, who saw the film at the 1991 Sundance Film Festival. Jacks and his colleague, Sean Daniel, had been searching for a first project for their production company, Alphaville Films, which would have an exclusive production and distribution deal with Universal. Hoping to get Universal to finance the film for $6 million, Jacks called Linklater and flew him to Los Angeles to discuss producing a studio film. Linklater agreed, and received a $25,000 check to write the script, which he used to pay off his debts from producing Slacker.

For several years, Linklater had thought about and written notes about a film that would "capture the moment-to-moment reality of being a teenager". When asked in an interview about his next film, Linklater said "I want to make this teenage rock'n'roll spree. I knew I wanted the story to take place on one day in the spring of 1976, but at one point it was much more experimental. The whole movie took place in a car with the characters driving around listening to ZZ Top." Lee Daniel, the director of photography, described the concept: "It would have been two shots—one of a guy putting in an eight-track of ZZ Top's Fandango! and one of two guys driving around talking. The film would be the length of the actual album, and you'd hear each track in the background as a source." Eventually, Linklater decided "to represent different points of view" in his script, the first draft of which took a month to complete. Universal Studios fast tracked production of Linklater's script, jumping ahead of 30 other films which were in development at that time. Linklater based much of the story off his own experiences growing up in Huntsville, Texas. The names and personalities of many characters were lifted from actual classmates and acquaintances of Linklater.

Linklater sought to hire members of his Slacker crew for Dazed and Confused. Many of those who had worked on Slacker were wary of the project's ties to Hollywood, and had assumed Linklater's next feature would be another independent film. However, he succeeded in bringing on many members of his old crew, including Lee Daniel as director of photography. Linklater commented that "I think some of the pros involved saw us as these indie, Slacker amateurs, but we'd all earned it." He stated that bringing back his old crew members "brought our little Slacker punk spirit to everything we did on Dazed." To achieve a 1970s look, Linklater avoided using Steadicam.

=== Casting ===
Linklater wanted to use undiscovered talent for Dazed, and enlisted co-producer Anne Walker-McBay, who had helped cast Slacker, to search for talent throughout Texas. Walker-McBay handed out cards to high schoolers and conducted interviews to find extras and cast minor roles. Casting searches were done in Austin, New York, and Los Angeles. Vince Vaughn was almost cast as the bully O'Bannion before Ben Affleck was chosen. As Linklater put it, "Ben was smart and full of life. You don't cast the unappealing person, you cast the appealing person." Other young actors considered for roles include Elizabeth Berkley, Mira Sorvino, Ashley Judd, Brendan Fraser, Jon Favreau, Ron Livingston and Claire Danes. Casting director Don Phillips said, "We wanted Claire Danes for the girl, but she was too young. She couldn't leave school." Renee Zellweger has an uncredited role in the film, but was originally considered for the part of Darla, which went to Parker Posey instead. Linklater said, "Parker was just crazier." Wiley Wiggins was the "big find" in Austin, according to Linklater, who described him as "a 15-year-old with all the bad habits of a grad student: smoking cigarettes, hanging out at coffee shops, my kind of guy." Linklater describes Walker-McBay as "flipping out" over her discovery of Wiley Wiggins due to his name and long hair. In total, the entire supporting cast and eight of the main ensemble actors were found in Texas.

Matthew McConaughey was not originally cast in the film, as the role of Wooderson was originally small and meant to be cast locally for budget purposes. He was a film student at the University of Texas in Austin and went out drinking with his girlfriend one night. They ended up at the Hyatt hotel bar since his friend was a bartender there and could get them a discount. He approached casting director Phillips in the bar. Phillips recalls, "The bartender says to him, 'See that guy down there? That's Don Phillips. He cast Sean Penn in Fast Times.' And Matthew goes, 'I'm gonna go down and talk to this guy.'" Phillips also recalls that Linklater did not like McConaughey at first because he was "too handsome".

== Filming ==
=== Development of characters ===
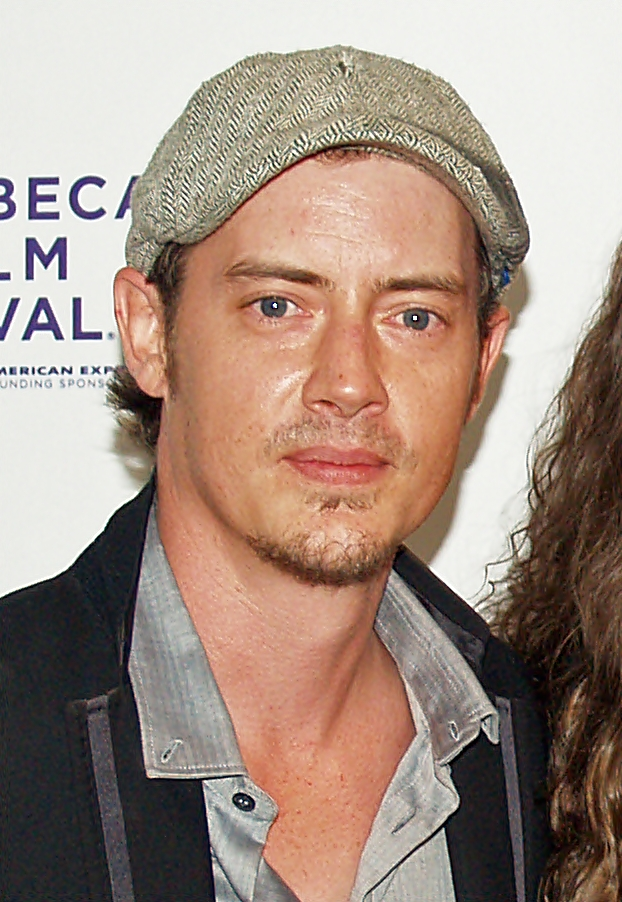
Jason London (pictured in 2008) drew on his own experiences of growing up and playing football in small-town Oklahoma to portray and develop Randall "Pink" Floyd's frustration.

Shooting began in July 1992 with the cast lodged at the Crest Hotel on Congress Avenue. According to Affleck, the "party environment" at the hotel mirrored the film itself, "just letting all these 19-year-olds hang out and get drunk and get stoned and run around the hotel and cause trouble." Linklater worked with the actors throughout the shoot to develop their characters. According to Joey Lauren Adams, Linklater told the cast "if you don't like your character, change it." He allowed the cast to pick out their own costumes, and encouraged the actors to bring their own experiences to their roles. Affleck, for instance, drew on memories of his alcoholic father to portray O'Bannion, while Jason London took inspiration from his childhood in Wanette, Oklahoma, to develop Floyd's dissatisfaction with "small-townishness". Linklater also created mixtapes for each actor of music their characters would listen to.

Some roles which were intended to be larger were reduced. The Kevin Pickford character, played by Shawn Andrews, was meant to be a larger role, but due to his behavior with other cast members, Pickford's screen time was cut in favor of McConaughey's character, Wooderson. Much of the Wooderson role was improvised or written on the spot, giving McConaughey more screen time. Linklater recalled "There was another actor, [Andrews], who was kind of the opposite [of McConaughey]. He wasn't really getting along with everybody. I could tell the actors weren't responding to him." Linklater had to break up a fight between Andrews and London at one point. On screen, the two characters barely speak to each other during the film. Milla Jovovich, who played Michelle, Pickford's girlfriend, had her role reduced because, in Linklater's words, "it didn't really gel."

To faithfully portray the 1970s, Keith and Melanie Fletcher of the costume department shopped for vintage clothes at thrift stores and in small towns. Because most cast members did not have long hair at the time, many, such as Parker Posey and Rory Cochrane wore wigs to replicate hair styles from the era. Special attention was paid to differentiating the cliques of each character by their wardrobe; stoner characters, for instance, were given more layered clothes to appear "not sloppy but comfortable".

=== Shooting ===
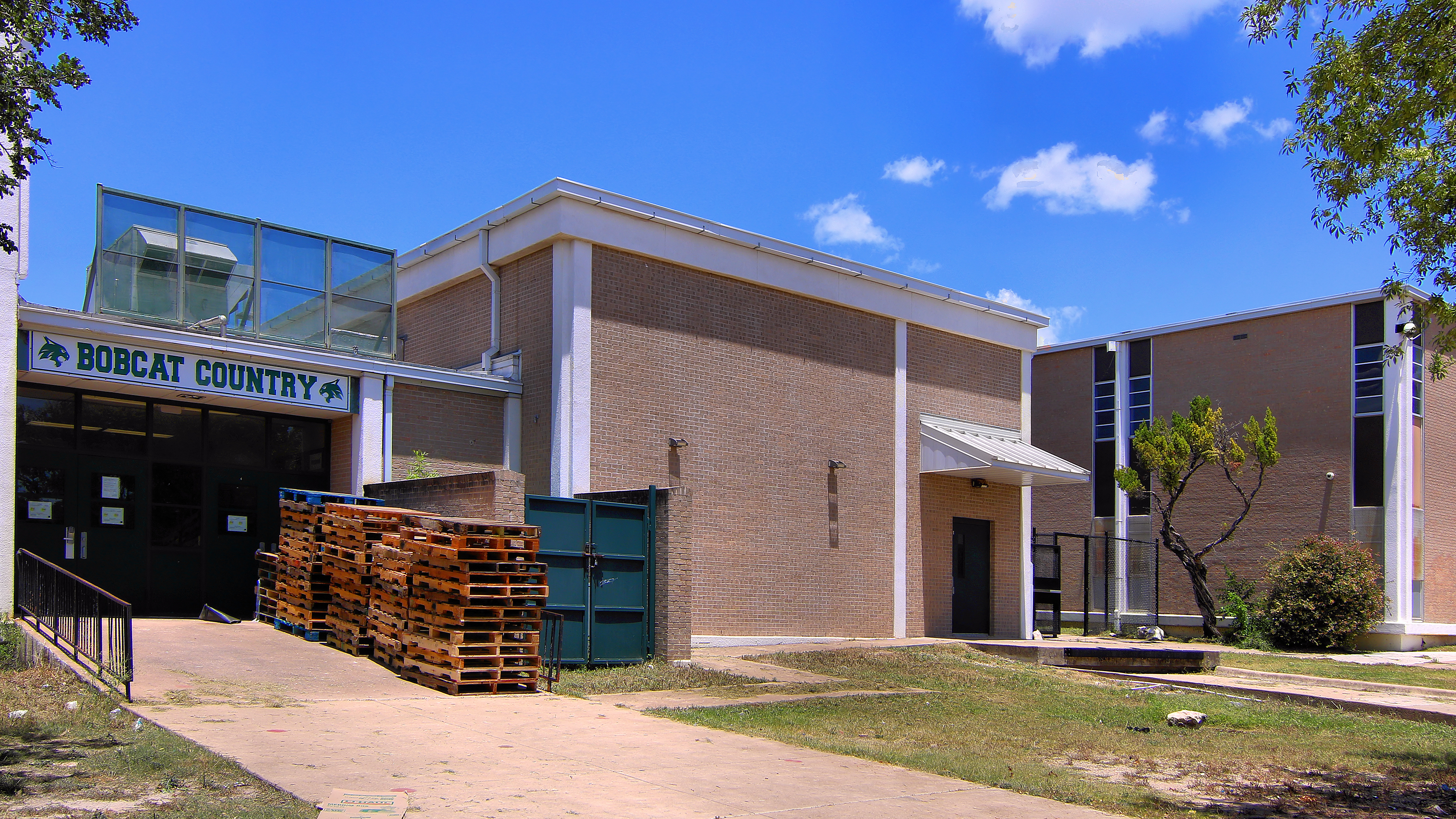
Bedichek Middle School stood in for fictional Robert E. Lee High School.

Linklater's improvisational and experimental directing style caused concern with studio officials, as did the ability of many members of his Slacker crew. Lee Daniel was almost fired after the rushes of the day, deemed unusable, were shown. The atmosphere on set was characterized by mutual animosity between the Slacker crew, the studio crew, and the executives. Linklater would tell the actors that it was "us against them", which first assistant director John Cameron noted mirrored the plot of the film.

Universal encouraged Linklater to add nudity to the film. According to Jacks, the studio "really wanted more sex. Their point was, if we were gonna get an R rating, why not get it for sex? They weren't saying don't have language and drugs, but it was like, we might as well have sex, too." Linklater recalls Universal chairman Tom Pollock telling Don Phillips to "get me some tits in this movie". To attempt to secure an extra 500,000 dollars, Linklater wrote in a scene in which Mike, Tony, and Cynthia are flashed by a woman while cruising around, which he later removed. Linklater was initially to have a cameo in which he would have made out with actress Autumn Barr, but he dropped out due to not having time to film it.

Bedichek Middle School in Austin was the location for the film's fictional Robert E. Lee High School. At the same time, Everette L. Williams Elementary, which is located near Georgetown, stood in for Williams Middle School. The scene in which the freshman girls are hazed was shot in a hot parking lot, with many actors and extras lacking sunscreen. The prop crew could not find an acceptable substitute for the condiments to be poured on the girls, so real mustard and ketchup were used. Posey improvised many of her lines in the scene as Darla. Posey revealed that the line "wipe that face off your head!" came from a mistranslation of the play In the Jungle of Cities. According to actor Jeremy Fox, Affleck and Cole Hauser both hurt Fox when filming his paddling scene, leading to complaints from Fox's mother. The scene in which Mitch throws a bowling ball out of a car was filmed in a neighborhood south of Austin. Wiley Wiggins surprised the cast and crew by throwing the ball out on the first take, letting it crash into trash cans and lawns as it rolled down a hill. Wiggins lied to Linklater about his baseball abilities, leading to the hiring of a stunt double to pitch in the movie. While filming, Posey and Adams wrote additional scenes, including the entirety of the scene in which the character Shavonne says "she called you a bitch and you a slut", for their characters, as many scenes with female characters had been cut or whittled down.

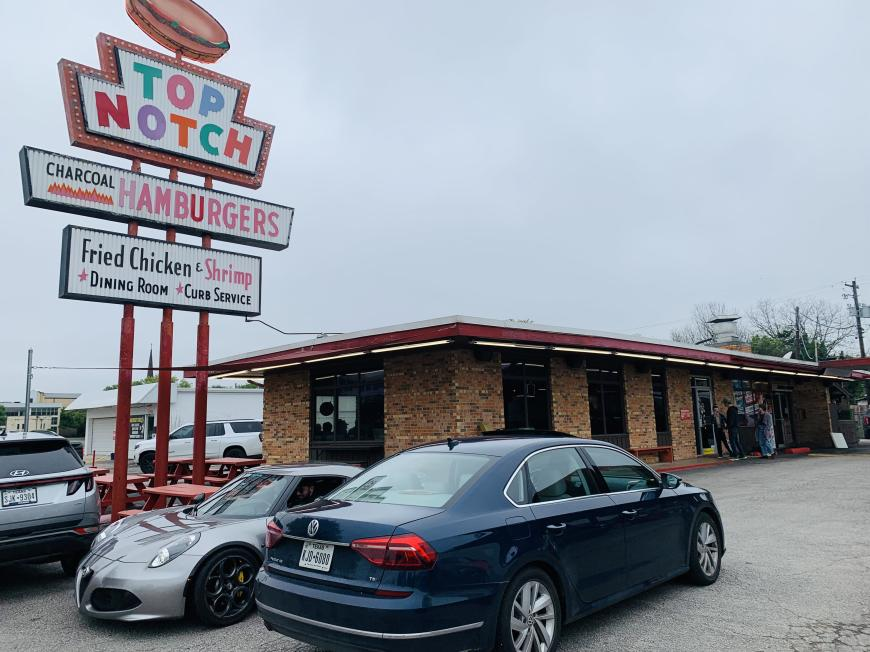
Filming took place at the Top Notch Hamburger restaurant in Austin. While filming a scene at the restaurant, Matthew McConaughey improvised his "all right, all right, all right" line.

Scenes were also shot at the Top Notch Hamburgers location on Burnet Road in Austin. The Top Notch scene, in which Wooderson invites the nerd characters to the keg party, was the first scene filmed with McConaughey. He recalls saying, "Give me 30 minutes, 'cause I need to take a walk and go through 'Who am I?'" He remembered a live record of Jim Morrison repeating "all right" four times. McConaughey considered Wooderson to care about four things: his car, getting high, rock and roll, and girls. "Right around this time, I hear, 'Action!'" says McConaughey, "In my mind, I go, 'Well, he's got three out of four of those things, and here's the fourth that I'm pullin' up to go get right now.'" McConaughey used this line of thought to craft the line "all right, all right, all right", which later became a catchphrase for both McConaughey and his character. McConaughey's father died during filming, and McConaughey briefly left the shoot for his funeral. He returned quickly and immediately filmed Wooderson's scene outside the Emporium.

The keg party scenes were shot at Walter E. Long Metropolitan Park, where a 20-to-30-foot (6 to 9 m) replica moontower was built for the movie. Linklater was disappointed with the height of the replica, and used a wide lens and close-ups for the scene in which Slater, Pink, and Mitch scale the tower, never showing its full height. To realistically portray the party and kill time during shots, many of the actors brought and consumed alcohol and smoked marijuana. The scene was shot all night, up to 2 or 3 in the morning the next day.

The scene on the football field near the end of the film was among the last to be shot, and was filmed at the Tony Burger Activity Center. Linklater was not entirely sure of how to end the movie, knowing only that he had to wrap up the central dilemma of Pink signing the clean-living pledge. Linklater took suggestions and advice from the actors on constructing the scene, adding improvised lines and moments throughout the night. Because the character of Pickford had been replaced with Wooderson, few lines were written for the character, leading McConaughey to suggest adding the "it's just about livin'" line to the scene. McConaughey later said that the line took inspiration from his father. The final scene shot was the one in which Pink, Slater, Simone, and Wooderson drive to Houston to buy tickets. Production ended on August 27.

=== Post production ===
Editing began that September in Austin. Linklater recalled that the editing process was mostly harmonious, with the team following goals set by editor Sandra Adair rather than "daily or weekly deadlines". During the editing process, the film was cut down from 165 minutes to 102. Many darker scenes originally shot for the film were cut, including one in which Benny disparages two Vietnamese refugees, and another in which Kaye and Jodi reflect on a teenager's tombstone during the party. A research screening was held in a Dallas shopping center in November, which produced a score of around 38 (out of 100) in Linklater's recollection. Further screenings improved the score to the high 70s and low 80s. Linklater blamed the low ratings at the Dallas showing on the screening being scheduled at the same time as a Dallas Cowboys game and a lack of clear instructions to viewers.

== Soundtrack ==
The process for song clearance began in November with the aid of music supervisor Harry Garfield. Nearly ten percent of the film's budget had been set aside for music rights, with Linklater stating that music is "the major element of the movie." Linklater created mixtapes for each major character and sent them to the actors, helping to decide upon songs for the soundtrack. Some songs chosen had been released some years prior to 1976, reflecting Linklater's view that the characters would have been listening to greatest hits albums and not necessarily new songs. Universal cut the music budget just before production began, assuring Linklater that it was common practice to increase it again during post-production, which ultimately did not happen.

The Led Zeppelin song "Rock and Roll" was originally to have played during the final scene and end credits. According to Linklater, he "bribed" Jimmy Page for the song rights by sending him LaserDiscs and recording an emotional personal plea. Page consented to the song's use, but fellow Led Zeppelin member Robert Plant did not. An angered Linklater wrote in his Dazed by Days journal of the film's making that he resolved to "boycott Plant for life." Allegedly at the request of a Geffen Records hitmaker, Universal employed the band Jackyl to record a cover of "We're an American Band" for the credits without consulting Linklater. After discovering that Jackyl's involvement had been part of the album deal the entire time, Linklater sent the band a letter explaining that the re-recording did not fit with his vision for the film, leading the band to pull out of the deal. The studio also attempted to cut down the soundtrack cost by simply recording 1970s guitar licks.

The soundtrack for the film was released on September 28, 1993, by The Medicine Label, the same week as the film. The songs "Hurricane" by Bob Dylan, "Hey Baby" by Ted Nugent, and "Sweet Emotion" by Aerosmith were included in the film, but not on the commercial soundtracks due to licensing costs. "The Alien Song (For Those Who Listen)" by Milla Jovovich was briefly performed by Jovovich's character Michelle Burroughs, but was not included in the soundtrack.

Dazed and Confused

Soundtrack album by Various Artists
- Released: September 28, 1993
- Recorded: 1970s
- Genres: Hard rock, blues rock, heavy metal, glam rock, Southern rock, funk, soft rock
- Length: 56:56
- Label: Giant/Medicine

Dazed and Confused (1993)
No.	Title	Artist	Length
1.	"Rock and Roll, Hoochie Koo"	Rick Derringer	3:44
2.	"Slow Ride" (Single version)	Foghat	3:58
3.	"School's Out"	Alice Cooper	3:29
4.	"Jim Dandy"	Black Oak Arkansas	2:42
5.	"Tush"	ZZ Top	2:17
6.	"Love Hurts"	Nazareth	3:53
7.	"Stranglehold"	Ted Nugent	8:24
8.	"Cherry Bomb"	The Runaways	2:19
9.	"Fox on the Run"	Sweet	3:26
10.	"Low Rider"	War	3:13
11.	"Tuesday's Gone"	Lynyrd Skynyrd	7:32
12.	"Highway Star"	Deep Purple	6:08
13.	"Rock and Roll All Nite"	Kiss	2:57
14.	"Paranoid"	Black Sabbath	2:47
Total length:			56:56

Even More Dazed and Confused (1994)
No.	Title	Artist	Length
1.	"Free Ride"	Edgar Winter Group	3:08
2.	"No More Mr. Nice Guy"	Alice Cooper	3:07
3.	"Living in the USA"	The Steve Miller Band	4:05
4.	"Never Been Any Reason"	Head East	5:12
5.	"Why Can't We Be Friends?"	War	3:51
6.	"Summer Breeze"	Seals and Crofts	3:25
7.	"Right Place, Wrong Time"	Dr. John	2:54
8.	"Balinese"	ZZ Top	2:39
9.	"Lord Have Mercy On My Soul"	Black Oak Arkansas	6:14
10.	"I Just Want to Make Love to You"	Foghat	4:19
11.	"Show Me the Way"	Peter Frampton	4:41
12.	"Do You Feel Like We Do"	Peter Frampton	7:13
Total length:			50:52

=== Certifications ===
Region	Certification	Certified units/sales
Canada (Music Canada)	3× Platinum	300,000^{^}
United States (RIAA)	2× Platinum	2,000,000^{^}
^{^} Shipments figures based on certification alone.

== Marketing and release ==
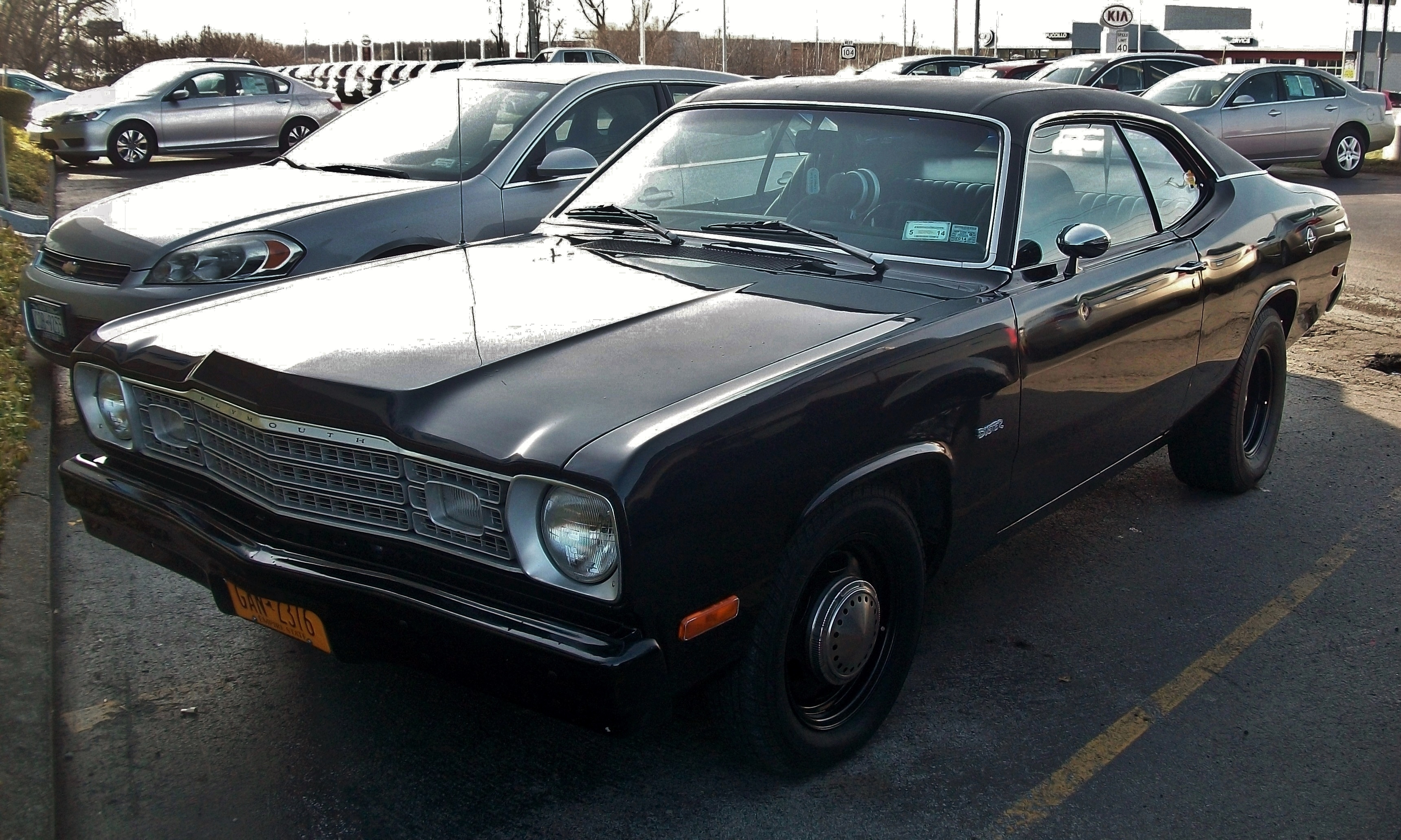
A Plymouth Duster was featured on the original poster for the film, which Linklater believed to be superior to the one developed by Gramercy Pictures.

Gramercy Pictures distributed and marketed Dazed and Confused. Against Linklater's wishes, Gramercy president Russel Schwartz pushed to market the film as a stoner comedy as a means of profiting off the growing culture war around marijuana. Gramercy's press kit included articles on the resurgence of marijuana, papers to roll joints with, and pot-leaf earrings. Linklater disagreed with this approach, claiming that he "didn't want weed to be the big joke. I just wanted it to be a natural part of their lives." The marketing team quoted negative comments about the alcohol and drug content in the film from the MPAA and film reviewers to further create publicity.

One poster designed for the film by Gramercy depicted a large smiley face, which further upset Linklater, who believed the smiley would have been "out of the culture" by 1976, when the film takes place. Several cannabis-based puns were used as taglines, such as "the film everyone will be toking about", and "see it with a bud". Linklater hired rock and roll poster designer Frank Kozik to design a different poster that featured a collage of yearbook pictures of the cast with a superimposed Plymouth Duster. Gramercy rejected the poster, believing the film should use marijuana as a hook to avoid the problems of marketing an unknown cast. Another poster was designed that features Jovovich with a smoky background, as Jovovich was the best-known cast member at the time. Schwartz attempted to set up screenings for Christian, antidrug, and conservative groups to force a protest for publicity.

Although Linklater wanted the film to be in cinemas just before the end of the school year, Gramercy told him that there "was not enough time". The film had its premiere at the Seattle International Film Festival in June before being released in theatres on September 24, 1993, in 183 theaters, grossing $918,127 on its opening weekend. It went on to make $7.9 million in North America. The film was released in less than 200 theatres nationwide, which Schwartz called "death. Too big to be platform and too small to be commercial." Upset by the film's failure, Linklater blamed Universal's lack of interest in the film, and published his diary from the making of Dazed and Confused in The Austin Chronicle.

=== Home video ===
MCA/Universal released Dazed and Confused on laserdisc in January 1994, followed by a VHS release two months later. A 2004 release entitled Dazed and Confused: Flashback Party Edition contained The Blunt Truth, a four-minute parody of 1970s anti-cannabis educational films. The film was released on HD DVD in 2006. The Criterion Collection released a two-disc boxed-set edition of the film on June 6, 2006, in the U.S. and Canada. Features included an audio commentary by Richard Linklater, deleted scenes, the original trailer, the 50 minute "Making Dazed" documentary that aired on the American Movie Classics channel on September 18, 2005, on-set interviews, behind-the-scenes footage, cast auditions and footage from the ten-year anniversary celebration. Also included is a 72-page book featuring new essays by Kent Jones, Jim DeRogatis, and Chuck Klosterman as well as memories from the cast and crew, character profiles and a mini reproduction of the original film poster designed by Frank Kozik. Entertainment Weekly gave it an "A" rating and stated that it "grants this enduring cult classic the DVD treatment it deserves". Universal Studios released Dazed and Confused on Blu-ray in August 2011, in a 1080p/AVC MPEG-4 transfer, with a DTS-HD Master Audio 5.1 soundtrack.

On February 21, 2023, The Criterion Collection re-released the film on 4K UHD Blu-ray, featuring a new remaster from the original camera negative.

== Reception ==
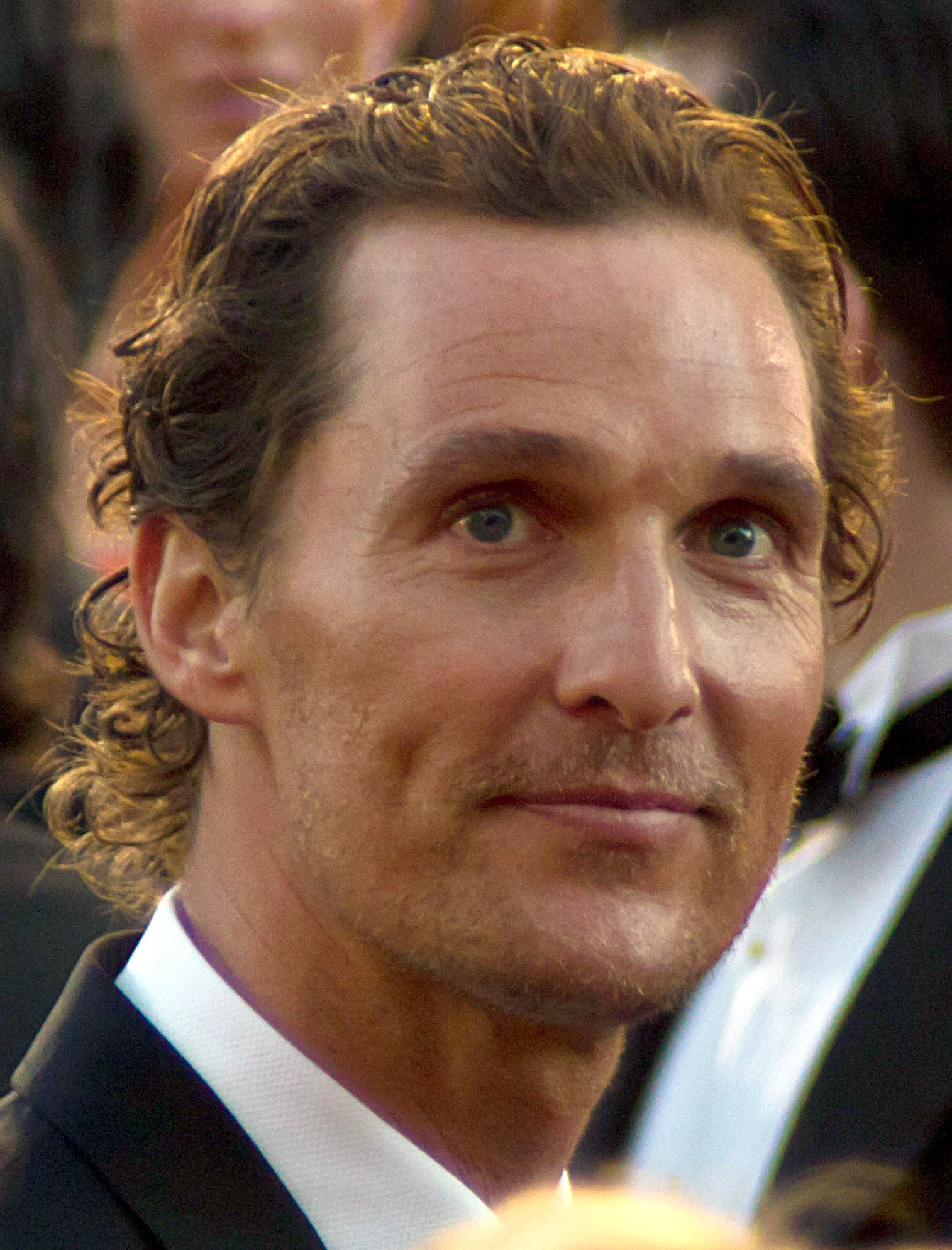
Matthew McConaughey was singled out for praise by critics for his portrayal of Wooderson.

Dazed and Confused received positive reviews from critics. On review aggregator Rotten Tomatoes, it has a 94% approval rating based on 69 reviews, with a weighted average score of 8.1/10. The website's critical consensus reads: "Featuring an excellent ensemble cast, a precise feel for the 1970s, and a killer soundtrack, Dazed and Confused is a funny, affectionate, and clear-eyed look at high school life." Metacritic gives it a score of 82 out of 100 based on reviews from 21 critics.

Film critic Roger Ebert awarded the film three stars out of four, praising the film as "art crossed with anthropology" with a "painful underside". Janet Maslin of The New York Times wrote, "Dazed and Confused has an enjoyably playful spirit, one that amply compensates for its lack of structure". Desson Howe of The Washington Post, wrote, "Dazed succeeds on its own terms and reflects American culture so well, it becomes part of it". In her review for The Austin Chronicle, Marjorie Baumgarten gave particular praise to Matthew McConaughey's performance: "He is a character we're all too familiar with in the movies but McConaughey nails this guy without a hint of condescension or whimsy, claiming this character for all time as his own".

Rolling Stone's Peter Travers gave the film four stars out of four, and praised Linklater as a "sly and formidable talent, bringing an anthropologist's eye to this spectacularly funny celebration of the rites of stupidity. His shitfaced American Graffiti is the ultimate party movie – loud, crude, socially irresponsible and totally irresistible". In his review for Time, Richard Corliss wrote, "Linklater is surely no ham-fisted moralist, and his film has lots of attitude to shake a finger at. But it also has enough buoyant '70s music to shake anybody's tail feather, and a kind of easy jubilance of narrative and character". Owen Gleiberman of Entertainment Weekly gave the film an "A" rating, and wrote, "Yet if Linklater captures the comic goofiness of the time, he also evokes its liberating spirit. The film finds its meaning in the subtle clash between the older, sadistic macho-jock ethos and the follow-your-impulse hedonism that was the lingering legacy of the '60s".

== Legacy ==
Quentin Tarantino included it on his list of the 10 greatest films of all time in the 2002 Sight and Sound poll. In 2003, Entertainment Weekly ranked the film No. 17 on its list of "The Top 50 Cult Films", No. 3 on its list of the 50 Best High School Movies, No. 10 on its "Funniest Movies of the Past 25 Years" list, and No. 6 on its "The Cult 25: The Essential Left-Field Movie Hits Since '83" list. Rotten Tomatoes' editorial team credits the film for "putting Austin, Texas, on the map."

In October 2004, three of Linklater's former classmates from Huntsville High School, whose surnames are Wooderson, Slater, and Floyd, filed a defamation lawsuit against Linklater, claiming to be the basis for the similarly named characters on the film. The lawsuit was filed in New Mexico which has a longer statute of limitations than Texas. The suit was subsequently dismissed.

In 2012, McConaughey reprised his role as Wooderson in the Butch Walker and The Black Widows music video "Synthesizers". To celebrate the film's 20th anniversary in 2013, the film received the Star of Texas award from the Texas Film Hall of Fame. Linklater accepted the award after being introduced by Tarantino, who reiterated his appreciation of the film as his favorite of the 1990s. The event featured a reunion of several cast members including Adams, Wiggins, Christin Hinojosa, Nicky Katt, Mona Lee, Catherine Avril Morris, Anthony Rapp, Marissa Ribisi, Michelle Burke Thomas, and Mark Vandermeulen. At the event, Linklater described his intent to create an inverse John Hughes film: "The drama is so low-key in [Dazed & Confused]. I don't remember teenage [sic] being that dramatic. I remember just trying to go with the flow, socialize, fit in and be cool. The stakes were really low. To get Aerosmith tickets or not? That's a big thing. It was really rare when the star-crossed lovers from the opposite side of the tracks and the girl gets pregnant and there's a car crash and somebody dies. That didn't really happen much. But riding around and trying to look for something to do with the music cranked up, now that happened a lot!"

After his later feature Boyhood was released in 2014, Linklater announced that his next film, Everybody Wants Some!!, would be a "spiritual sequel" to Dazed and Confused. The newer film takes place at a Texas college in 1980.

== See also ==
- List of cult films

== Works cited ==
- Maerz, Melissa (2020). Alright, Alright, Alright: The Oral History of Richard Linklater's Dazed and Confused. HarperCollins. ISBN 9780062908490.
- Spitz, Marc (December 26, 2013). "An Oral History of Dazed and Confused". Maxim. Archived from the original on April 28, 2017. Retrieved May 7, 2017.
- Allan, David (2023-05-26). "'Dazed and Confused' are not typically goals when traveling, except in Austin". CNN. Retrieved 2024-05-16.
- Linklater, Richard (September 24, 1993). "Dazed by Days". The Austin Chronicle. Vol. 13, no. 4. Archived from the original on November 8, 2020. Retrieved April 2, 2024 – via cinephiliabeyond.org.
- Cohen, Steven (August 8, 2011). "Dazed and Confused". High-Def Digest. Archived from the original on May 2, 2014.
