= Never Been Any Reason =

1975 single by Head East

Single by Head East

from the album Flat as a Pancake
- B-side: "One Against the Other"
- Released: 1975
- Recorded: 1974
- Genre: Hard rock
- Length: 5:11 (album version); 3:25 (single version)
- Label: Pyramid Records; A&M Records
- Songwriter: Mike Somerville
- Producer: Roger Boyd

Music video
- "Never Been Any Reason" on YouTube

"Never Been Any Reason" is the debut single by Head East from their debut album Flat as a Pancake. It was composed by the band's guitarist, Mike Somerville. It is often considered Head East's signature song, peaking at number 68 on the Billboard Hot 100, and continues to be played on classic rock radio stations in the US, generations after it was released.

The song features keyboardist Roger Boyd's double-tracked Minimoog solos throughout the song. Asked about the solos via the band's official website, Boyd said they were created due to an accident during mixing:

"It is two Minimoogs. Back in those days we did not have computerized mixing and had to mix "on the fly;" we forgot to mute one of the moog solos and when it went by we thought WOW! so we decided to go back and record the second part to match/compliment [sic] the primary solo part."

Lead vocals are alternated between drummer Steve Huston singing the first two lines of the verses and lead vocalist John Schlitt on the remainder of the song. Both the last line of each verse and the choruses feature multi-part vocal harmonies sung by all the members of the band.

The song was featured in the 1993 film Dazed and Confused, and later in the 2005 film Sahara.

AC/DC appropriated the song's riff for their 1980 hit "You Shook Me All Night Long".

The song has become the official theme song for the internationally recognized Riverwest 24 bike race held annually in Milwaukee, Wisconsin. Spotify listens spike due to the song being played on loop for 24 hours straight.

== Charts ==
Chart (1975)	Peak position
US Billboard Hot 100	68

== Certifications ==
Region	Certification	Certified units/sales
United States (RIAA)	Gold	500,000^{‡}
^{‡} Sales+streaming figures based on certification alone.
