= The Computer Wore Tennis Shoes (1995 film) =

- Official advertisement poster
- Genre: Science fiction comedy
- Based on: The Computer Wore Tennis Shoes by Joseph L. McEveety
- Written by: Joseph L. McEveety; Ryan Rowe
- Directed by: Peyton Reed
- Starring: Kirk Cameron
- Music by: Philip Giffin
- Country of origin: United States
- Original language: English

Production
- Executive producers: George Zaloom; Les Mayfield; Scott Immergut
- Producer: Joseph B. Wallenstein
- Cinematography: Russ Alsobrook
- Editor: Jeff Gourson
- Running time: 87 minutes
- Production companies: Zaloom/Mayfield Productions; Walt Disney Television

Original release
- Network: ABC
- Release: February 18, 1995

The Computer Wore Tennis Shoes is a 1995 American made-for-television science fiction comedy film directed by Peyton Reed (in his feature directorial debut) and written by Joseph L. McEveety and Ryan Rowe. The film is a remake of the 1969 film of the same name. It premiered on ABC as an ABC Family Movie on February 18, 1995. It is the second in a series of four remakes of Disney live-action films produced for broadcast on the network during the 1994–95 television season, the other three being The Shaggy Dog, Escape to Witch Mountain, and Freaky Friday.

The film stars Kirk Cameron in the lead role of Dexter Riley, a boy who becomes an instant genius, with encyclopedic knowledge. The film also co-stars Larry Miller and Dean Jones plays the role of an evil dean from a competing school.

== Plot ==
Dexter, a once lazy and underachieving student at Medfield College, becomes an instant genius when a freak computer lab accident transfers an entire online encyclopedia to his brain. He uses his newfound intellect to ace a physics midterm in under ten minutes. The dean of Medfield College wishes to capitalize on Dexter's superb intelligence by placing him on the school's quiz bowl team and allowing him to recruit his friends as teammates.

Medfield College wins several quiz bowls matches with Dexter exclusively answering every question. He receives national recognition and generates positive publicity for Medfield College. Dexter's success also has a negative impact. His friends believe he is becoming too conceited and contemplate leaving the quiz bowl team. Norwood Gill, a child prodigy and computer hacker from the rival school Hale University that won the Quiz Bowl three times and develops an obsession with Dexter, and probes into his background. Government agents also investigate Dexter as a potential computer hacker known as "Viper".

Norwood ultimately uncovers the origin of Dexter's intellect. He exposes the information during a quiz bowl broadcast, but the revelation is largely dismissed by the audience. As Norwood prepares to compete against Dexter in the quiz bowl championship, he infects him with a computer virus that negates his encyclopedic knowledge. The virus takes full effect midway through the championship, forcing Dexter to rely on his teammates for support. Medfield College ultimately wins the championship and celebrates. Norwood is apprehended by government agents for committing several cybercrimes when he exposes himself as The Viper.

== Cast ==
- Kirk Cameron as Dexter Riley
- Larry Miller as Dean Al Valentine
- Jason Bernard as Professor Miles Quigley
- Andrew Woodworth as Will Rafferty
- Anne Marie Tremko as Sarah Matthews
- Mathew McCurley as Norwood Gill
- Jeff Maynard as Gozin
- Charles Lane as Regent Yarborough
- Paul Dooley as Senator Thatch
- Dan Castellaneta as Alan Winsdale
- Dean Jones as Dean Webster Carlson
- Christin Hinojosa as Penelope
- Eric Schaeffer as Rich Prentiss
- Jeff Garlin as Agent Reese
- Eddie Deezen as Agent Tucker
- Norris Young as Rathouser #7
- John Wesley as Dr. Freeman
- Sean Gavigan as Prof. Knowlton
- Janet Rotblatt as Prof. Goldstein
- Adrian Ricard as Mrs. Weaver
- Joe Minjares as Brazilian
- Iqbal Theba as Sri Lankan
- Darshanie Bruite as Princess Ahmiri
- John Petlock as Maitre'D
- Paul Barselou as Regent Mears
- Frank Bausmith as Gent
- Renee Ridgeley as Mother
- Josh Wolford as Boy
- Lelia Goldoni as Hale Club Woman
- Jeffrey Lampert as Stage Manager
- Peyton Reed as Policeman

Uncredited

- Julia Sweeney (television reporter)

== Reception ==
Variety gave the film a moderately positive review, calling it an "utterly silly yarn" that "lacks the zaniness of the original", and complimented Larry Miller's performance. People gave it a B+ rating and called it a "fun, facile remake" with a good cast.
