= Eyes Wide Open =

Eyes Wide Open may refer to:

== Music ==
- Eyes Wide Open (King Crimson album), 2003
- Eyes Wide Open (Sabrina Carpenter album), 2015
- Eyes Wide Open (Twice album), 2020
- "Eyes Wide Open" (Gotye song), 2010
- "Eyes Wide Open" (Sabrina Carpenter song), 2015
- "Eyes Wide Open" (Staind song), 2012
- Eyes Wide Open, a 1992 album by David Garza
- Eyes Wide Open, a 2015 album by Klear
- "Eyes Wide Open", a 2012 song by Dirty South
- "Eyes Wide Open", a song by Jars of Clay from The Shelter, 2010
- "Eyes Wide Open", a song by Sara Groves from Fireflies and Songs, 2009

== Other uses ==
- Eyes Wide Open (exhibit), an exhibit in memory of the American soldiers of the Iraq War
- Eyes Wide Open (film), a 2009 Israeli film
- Eyes Wide Open (Friday Night Lights), an episode of the TV series Friday Night Lights
- Eyes Wide Open (Middle episode), an episode of the 9th season of The Middle
- Eyes Wide Open: Going Behind the Environmental Headlines, a 2014 book by Paul Fleischman
- "Eyes Wide Open", a 1999 memoir by Frederic Raphael

== See also ==
- Eyes Wide Shut (disambiguation)
