= Eyes Wide Open (Friday Night Lights) =

- Friday Night Lights episode
- Episode no.: Season 1 Episode 2
- Directed by: Jeffrey Reiner
- Written by: Jason Katims
- Cinematography by: David Boyd
- Editing by: Peter B. Ellis
- Original release date: October 10, 2006
- Running time: 43 minutes

Guest appearance
- Walter Perez as Bobby "Bull" Reyes

Episode chronology
← Previous "Pilot"	Next → "Wind Sprints"
- Friday Night Lights (season 1)

"Eyes Wide Open" is the second episode of the first season of the American sports drama television series Friday Night Lights, inspired by the 1990 nonfiction book by H. G. Bissinger. The episode was written by executive producer Jason Katims and directed by co-executive producer Jeffrey Reiner. It originally aired on NBC on October 10, 2006.

The series is set in the fictional town of Dillon, a small, close-knit community in rural West Texas. It follows a high school football team, the Dillon Panthers. It features a set of characters, primarily connected to Coach Eric Taylor, his wife Tami, and their daughter Julie. In the episode, Eric feels the pressure of continuing the season without Jason, while the latter receives heartbreaking news.

According to Nielsen Media Research, the episode was seen by an estimated 5.87 million household viewers and gained a 2.1 ratings share among adults aged 18–49. The episode received near critical acclaim, with critics complimenting the performances and character development. Many felt that the episode was a strong follow-up to the pilot.

== Plot ==
Dillon joins in prayer for Jason (Scott Porter), whose injury will make him miss an entire month at the very least. Buddy (Brad Leland) confides in Eric (Kyle Chandler) his reservations on Matt (Zach Gilford), who will replace him as the team's quarterback.

Matt fails to impress during training, and Eric's concerns arise. Based on a comment by Landry (Jesse Plemons), Matt tells a reporter that his comparisons to Jason wouldn't matter, viewing Jason as the Red Hot Chili Peppers. Jason's absence also causes conflict in the team, with Tim (Taylor Kitsch) almost getting into a fight with Smash (Gaius Charles) after the latter takes Jason's place at the local fast food restaurant. That night, Tami (Connie Britton) tells Eric that she has taken a job at the high school as the new guidance counselor in order to pay their debts, although Eric is not delighted with the fact that she took it without talking with him. Eric then takes a phone call from Jason's doctor.

The following day, Eric informs the team that while Jason could regain the use of his upper body, he'll be paralyzed from the lower body, effectively ending his football career. This infuriates Tim, who was previously confronted by Lyla (Minka Kelly) for not visiting Jason at the hospital yet. Eric confides in Tami that he feels "screwed", starting to lose faith in his team. He visits Matt at his house, where he meets his grandmother, Lorraine (Louanne Stephens). He takes him to the football field, where he makes Matt practice with the crowd chanting in the speakers in order to get him to overcome his distractions. On Friday, the town prepares for their next game and their first without Jason. Eric talks with the Panthers, telling them that they are more than just one player and that everyone must work together in order to move from their loss. The team leaves for the field, where they receive the kickoff ball to begin the game.

== Production ==
=== Development ===
In September 2006, NBC announced that the second episode of the season would be titled "Eyes Wide Open". The episode was written by executive producer Jason Katims and directed by co-executive producer Jeffrey Reiner. This was Katims' first writing credit, and Reiner's first directing credit.

== Reception ==
=== Viewers ===
In its original American broadcast, "Eyes Wide Open" was seen by an estimated 5.87 million household viewers with a 2.1 in the 18–49 demographics. This means that 2.1 percent of all households with televisions watched the episode. It finished 69th out of 88 programs airing from October 9–15, 2006. This was a 19% decrease in viewership from the previous episode, which was watched by an estimated 7.17 million household viewers with a 2.5 in the 18–49 demographics.

=== Critical reviews ===
"Eyes Wide Open" received near critical acclaim. Sonia Saraiya of The A.V. Club gave the episode an "A–" grade and wrote, "the first time we see the wonderful montage that is the title sequence. It also ends with a heart-stopping kickoff in the pitch-black night; it's a beautiful episode."

Alan Sepinwall wrote, "Well, damn. When a show has a pilot as terrific as FNL, the show usually takes a small step back in the next few weeks as the creators try to figure out how to sustain that quality without just repeating themselves. But I found this episode even more gripping and well-done than the pilot."

Brett Love of TV Squad wrote, "Overall, this was a pretty slow episode in terms of the overall story. Almost a calm before the storm. I think it was necessary to give the weight to the Street injury, and it did set everything up for next week. Things should really pick up when the Panthers play game two. I have no idea which way they are going to go with it. A loss will ratchet up the tension on both Eric and Matt, but I could see them going with a win where Matt is mostly relegated to giving Smash the ball." Television Without Pity gave the episode an "A–" grade.

In a more negative review, Colin Moriarty of IGN gave the episode a "mediocre" 5.0 out of 10 and wrote, "it quickly became clear this week when Friday Night Lights aired its second episode, entitled 'Eyes Wide Open,' that Friday Night Lights probably doesn't have a hell of a lot of time left to prove itself. There are problems. In fact, with this series very much still in its infancy, there's a plethora of them."

Kyle Chandler submitted this episode for consideration for Outstanding Lead Actor in a Drama Series at the 59th Primetime Emmy Awards.
