= Open Your Eyes =

Open Your Eyes may refer to:

== Film ==
- Open Your Eyes (1919 film), an American melodrama directed by Gilbert P. Hamilton
- Open Your Eyes (1997 film) (Abre los ojos), a Spanish film by Alejandro Amenábar
- Open Your Eyes (2008 film), an American short film by Susan Cohen
- Open Your Eyes, a 2012 short film starring Lia Marie Johnson

== Television ==
- Open Your Eyes (TV series), Polish television series from 2021
- "Open Your Eyes" (The Walking Dead), an episode of The Walking Dead

== Music ==
=== Albums ===
- Open Your Eyes (Goldfinger album), or the title song, 2002
- Open Your Eyes (Warzone album), or the title song, 1989
- Open Your Eyes (Yes album), or the title song (see below), 1997
- Open Your Eyes, by David Hasselhoff, 2019
- Open Your Eyes, by The Faragher Brothers, 1979
- Open Your Eyes, by Kim Kyung Ho, 2003
- Open Your Eyes, by Maria Muldaur, 1979
- Open Your Eyes, by Rapture Ruckus, 2011
- Open Your Eyes, by Victoria Beckham, 2003
- Open Your Eyes, a mixtape by Macklemore, 2000

=== Songs ===
- "Open Your Eyes" (Alter Bridge song), 2004
- "Open Your Eyes" (Disturbed song), 2016
- "Open Your Eyes" (Guano Apes song), 1997
- "Open Your Eyes" (The Lords of the New Church song), 1982
- "Open Your Eyes" (Snow Patrol song), 2007
- "Open Your Eyes" (Yes song), 1997
- "Open Your Eyes", by 12 Stones from 12 Stones
- "Open Your Eyes", by AFI from Answer That and Stay Fashionable
- "Open Your Eyes", by Asia from Alpha
- "Open Your Eyes", by Basshunter from Calling Time
- "Open Your Eyes", by Bea Miller
- "Open Your Eyes", by Black Box from Dreamland
- "Open Your Eyes", by Bobby Caldwell from Cat in the Hat
- "Open Your Eyes", by Eyeopener
- "Open Your Eyes", by Hoobastank from The Reason
- "Open Your Eyes", by Iz*One from Bloom*Iz
- "Open Your Eyes", by John Legend from Love in the Future
- "Open Your Eyes", by Julian Lennon from Mr. Jordan
- "Open Your Eyes", by Loudness from The Birthday Eve
- "Open Your Eyes", by Nalin & Kane
- "Open Your Eyes", by Staind from Break the Cycle
- "Open Your Eyes", by Steve Angello and Alex Metric from the soundtrack of the video game FIFA 12
- "Open Your Eyes", by Stream of Passion from Embrace the Storm
- "Open Your Eyes", by Sum 41 from Chuck
- "Open Your Eyes", by United State of Electronica from U.S.E.

== Other uses ==
- Open Your Eyes (magazine), an American magazine for Latinos

== See also ==
- Eyelid
- Close Your Eyes (disambiguation)
