= Eyes Wide Open (exhibit) =

Exhibit created by the American Friends Service Committee

Eyes Wide Open logo

Eyes Wide Open is an exhibit created by the American Friends Service Committee (AFSC) observing the American soldiers and marines who died in the Iraq War (2003–2011). It contains a pair of combat boots to represent every American soldier and marine who died in the war, as well as shoes representing Iraqi civilians who lost their lives during the invasion and occupation.

The exhibit was first shown in Chicago's Federal Plaza in January 2004. At that time, the exhibit contained 504 pairs of boots.

As of March 2007, the national exhibit contained over 3,400 pairs of boots and had visited more than 100 cities in 40 states. However, as a result of its unmanageable size, the exhibit has been broken down state-by-state. Currently, nearly every state has its own state exhibit. The national exhibit in its entirety would currently contain more than 4,000 pairs of empty boots.

== Background ==
According to the AFSC, the intent of the exhibit is to present a visual reminder of the "human cost" of the Iraq War and provide a place for public mourning. Based on public information, the AFSC writes the name, age, rank and home state of each soldier and attaches it to a representative pair of boots. As the exhibit travels across the country, family members, friends and sympathizers leave flags, flowers and other mementos with individual pairs of boots. If a family wishes to have their child's name removed from the exhibit, the AFSC will replace the serviceman's name with the information "name removed request of family". September 11th Families for Peaceful Tomorrows co-sponsors the exhibit.

In addition to boots representing the deaths of service men and women, the AFSC has collected shoes representing Iraqis who have lost their lives during occupation. Few names of Iraqi dead are known. Raed Jarrar, an Iraqi social activist, has collected the names of several thousand Iraqi civilians. These are the names that appear on tags of civilian shoes at Eyes Wide Open exhibits and for another exhibit entitled, "Dreams and Nightmares". The AFSC’s Dreams and Nightmares is a memorial to Iraqi civilians that includes photographs and stories of individuals who have lost their lives during occupation.

== Related exhibits ==
Since the inauguration of the original exhibit, several other exhibits have been created to assist in the original one's goal.

=== Eyes Wide Open state exhibits ===
The national exhibit had grown so large by spring of 2007 that it had become difficult to transport by semi-truck. As a result, it was divided into state exhibits. Illinois established the first state exhibit in August 2006. Since July 2008, there are 48 state exhibits: Alabama, Alaska, Arizona, Arkansas, two in California, Colorado, Connecticut, Delaware, District of Columbia, Florida, Georgia, Hawaii, Idaho, Illinois, Indiana, Iowa, Kentucky, Maryland, Maine/Massachusetts, Michigan, Minnesota, Missouri/Kansas, Montana, New Hampshire, New Mexico, New York/New Jersey, North Carolina, Ohio, Oklahoma, Oregon, Pennsylvania, Puerto Rico, Rhode Island, South Dakota, South Carolina, Tennessee, Texas, Utah, Vermont, Virginia, Washington, West Virginia and Wisconsin. With the conclusion of the national exhibit, all but six states currently have their own exhibit. All of the Eyes Wide Open state exhibits continue to be under the leadership of The American Friends Service Committee.

=== The National Guard Exhibit ===
The National Guard Exhibit was created in summer of 2005 and contains 400+ pairs of boots for National Guard soldiers that have lost their lives in Iraq. The exhibit often also displays the boots of all soldiers lost from the exhibition state. In addition, the exhibit contains 50 pairs of civilian shoes representing the Iraqi civilians killed during occupation. The exhibit has visited more than 30 cities in 22 states. National Guard units are not often sent abroad.

=== Cost of War exhibit ===
At the conclusion of the National Eyes Wide Open Exhibit in June 2007, AFSC introduced the Cost of War exhibit. The exhibit contains ten 7- by 3-foot vinyl, full-color banners that compare the U.S. budget for the War in Iraq to the U.S. budget for human needs such as health care and education. Based on a report by economists Joseph Stiglitz and Linda Bilmes, one day of the Iraq War cost the U.S. $720 million or $500,000 per minute. In partnership with The National Priorities Project, AFSC has used these numbers on the daily cost of the Iraq War to determine how many human services one day of the Iraq War budget could cover. For example, "one day of the Iraq War" would buy 1,153,846 children school lunches for a year or provide 163,525 adults with full health coverage for one year. This exhibit is either shown alone or in conjunction with Eyes Wide Open Exhibits. There are currently 17 Cost of War Exhibits.

=== Addition of a veteran suicide component ===
Alarming studies of the suicide rate among veterans returning from the Iraq War led to the addition of a Veteran Suicide component to several state exhibits. Veteran suicides are considered a "hidden casualty count" of the Iraq War and are represented by white combat boots.

== Exhibit in popular media ==
The exhibit was featured in blues musician Robert Cray’s music video for "Twenty". The song "Twenty" tells the story of a fictional serviceman who returns to the U.S. haunted by his experience in Iraq. The video stars an Iraq War veteran, 23-year-old Aidan Delgado. Cray did not know of the Eyes Wide Open exhibit when he came up with the concept for the song, but realized that the exhibit would be a meaningful way for the character in his song to come to terms with the death he faced in Iraq. Robert Cray's album, also titled Twenty, was nominated for the 2006 Grammy Award for Best Contemporary Blues Album.
