= The Scorpion King =

2002 film by Chuck Russell

- Theatrical release poster
- Directed by: Chuck Russell
- Screenplay by: Stephen Sommers; William Osborne; David Hayter
- Story by: Stephen Sommers; Jonathan Hales
- Produced by: Sean Daniel; James Jacks; Kevin Misher; Stephen Sommers
- Starring: The Rock; Steven Brand; Kelly Hu; Bernard Hill; Grant Heslov; Peter Facinelli; Michael Clarke Duncan
- Cinematography: John R. Leonetti
- Edited by: Greg Parsons; Michael Tronick
- Music by: John Debney
- Production companies: WWF Entertainment; Alphaville Films; Misher Films
- Distributed by: Universal Pictures (United States and Canada); United International Pictures (International)
- Release date: April 19, 2002
- Running time: 91 minutes
- Countries: United States; Germany
- Language: English
- Budget: $60 million
- Box office: $178.8 million

The Scorpion King is a 2002 action-adventure film directed by Chuck Russell. The film stars Dwayne Johnson (credited as The Rock) as the lead, with Steven Brand, Kelly Hu, Grant Heslov, and Michael Clarke Duncan in supporting roles. It is both a prequel and spin-off of The Mummy franchise, with Johnson reprising his role from The Mummy Returns, and it launched The Scorpion King film series. The film was Johnson's first lead role.

The events of The Scorpion King take place 5,001 years before the events of The Mummy and The Mummy Returns, revealing the origins of Mathayus and his rise to power as the Scorpion King. This name is a reference to a historical king of the Protodynastic Period of Egypt, King Scorpion. The film was released on April 19, 2002 by Universal Pictures. The film received mixed reviews and grossed $178.8 million worldwide against a production budget of $60 million.

== Plot ==
Before the time of the pyramids, a horde of warriors from the East, led by Memnon, conquers most of the local tribes. No tribe is willing to fight Memnon, as his sorcerer can foresee any attack. Mathayus, along with his half-brother Jesup and their friend Rama, are the only surviving Akkadians. The trio is hired by King Pheron of the free tribes to kill the sorcerer.

The Akkadians sneak into Memnon's camp but are ambushed by guards, who were warned by Pheron's own son, Takmet, who had already betrayed and killed his father. Rama is killed, and Jesup is captured. Mathayus finds the sorcerer but discovers that the sorcerer is a woman, Cassandra, and spares her life before he is captured. After witnessing his brother's execution, Mathayus is buried up to his neck in the desert to be devoured by fire ants. He escapes with help from a fellow prisoner, a horse thief named Arpid, and vows to avenge his brother by finishing his mission.

Mathayus sneaks into Memnon's stronghold, Gomorrah, with the help of a street urchin, Tutu. Memnon's sympathetic court magician, Philos, helps direct Mathayus to the courtyard where Memnon is training. Mathayus' plan is interrupted, as he has to backtrack and rescue Tutu, and barely escapes Gomorrah. However, he abducts Cassandra along the way.

Memnon sends his warrior, Thorak, along with a group of his men, to retrieve Cassandra and kill Mathayus with scorpion venom. Mathayus leads Thorak and his battalion into a nearby cave during a sandstorm. Mathayus single-handedly kills Thorak and his men, but Thorak poisons him before succumbing to his wounds.

Cassandra cures Mathayus with her magic, believing that he is the world's best chance to kill Memnon and bring about peace. Although unsaid, Cassandra has secretly fallen in love with Mathayus since he spared and rescued her from Memnon, who had held her prisoner since she was a child.

Mathayus, Arpid, and Cassandra find Philos, who has perfected an explosive powder. However, they are ambushed by the free tribes, who are now under the rule of the Nubian King Balthazar. Mathayus defeats Balthazar in a fight and earns his reluctant respect and sanctuary, but Cassandra gives Mathayus two visions: one in which Memnon and his army slaughter the entire rebel camp, and another in which Mathayus dies facing Memnon. Mathayus reassures her that he will make his own destiny, and the two have sex.

The next morning, Cassandra returns to Memnon, plotting to kill him and prevent her visions. Memnon is determined to see if Cassandra has her vision, putting her to the test using six urns (two of them empty) and four cobras within the urns. Mathayus, with help from Balthazar, Arpid, Philos, and the army of rebels, launches an assault on Memnon's stronghold at the same time. Balthazar kills Takmet during the battle, avenging Pheron. The battle continues until a guard shoots Mathayus, as Cassandra predicted. As Memnon is about to claim victory, Cassandra kills the guard while Mathayus retrieves his bow and pulls the arrow from his back. He fires the arrow at the exhausted Memnon, sending him off the roof to his death. Philos and Arpid use the explosive powder to destroy the palace's foundation. With the battle over, the remnants of Memnon's army bow before Mathayus, who (by their law) is proclaimed the Scorpion King.

In the aftermath, Mathayus and Balthazar share a peaceful farewell as the latter returns to his kingdom. Cassandra warns Mathayus that this period of peace and prosperity is only temporary. Undeterred, Mathayus claims that he will continue to make his own destiny.

== Cast ==
- Dwayne Johnson as Mathayus of Akkad / The Scorpion King, an Akkadian assassin who was hired to kill Memnon's sorceress
- Steven Brand as Memnon, a ruthless king and conqueror who is bred for war
- Kelly Hu as Cassandra, Memnon's sorceress who was also his prisoner
- Grant Heslov as Arpid, a horse thief aiding Mathayus
- Bernard Hill as Philos, Memnon's personal engineer and explosives maker
- Michael Clarke Duncan as Balthazar, a rebel king leading the fight against Memnon
- Peter Facinelli as Takmet, a corrupt Prince who betrayed his people and swore fealty to Memnon
- Ralf Moeller as Thorak, the captain of Memnon's guards
- Branscombe Richmond as Jesup, Mathayus's brother
- Roger Rees as King Pheron, Takmet's father who oversaw a council of free tribes against Memnon
- Sherri Howard as Queen Isis, Balthazar's wife
- Joseph Ruskin as Tribal Leader
- Conrad Roberts as Chieftain

== Production ==
The production of The Scorpion King began as a spin-off of The Mummy Returns (2001), centering on the character Mathayus, portrayed by Dwayne "The Rock" Johnson. Recognizing the character's popularity, Universal Pictures decided to develop an origin story set in a distinct historical era, aiming to expand The Mummy franchise. The film marked Johnson's first lead role in a feature film, where he reprised the titular character introduced in The Mummy Returns. Johnson was paid $5.5 million for his performance, setting a record for the highest salary paid to a first-time lead actor, a substantial increase from the $500,000 he earned for his brief role in the preceding film.

== Release ==
Produced on a budget of $60 million, the film was positioned as a major action release for Universal Pictures. Recognizing Johnson's global popularity as a professional wrestler, the studio adopted an international release strategy, launching the film simultaneously in 11 overseas markets. Johnson's established appeal in over 130 countries was a key factor in the production's global marketing efforts.

The film was released on April 19, 2002, in the United States and Canada, Australia, the United Kingdom and Ireland, Hong Kong, Malaysia, the Philippines, Russia, Singapore, South Korea, Taiwan and Thailand.

=== Home media ===
The Scorpion King was released on DVD and VHS on October 1, 2002. It was released on Blu-ray on July 22, 2008, and was one of the first Universal titles released on the format. The Scorpion King was released on 4K on June 18, 2019.

=== Video games ===
The film inspired two video games: The Scorpion King: Rise of the Akkadian for the Nintendo GameCube and the PlayStation 2, which was a prequel to the film's events, and a sequel, The Scorpion King: Sword of Osiris, for the Game Boy Advance, in which Cassandra is abducted by the ruthless sorcerer Menthu and his lackey, the witch Isis (not to be confused with Queen Isis from the film), prompting Mathayus to undergo a quest to uncover the legendary Sword of Osiris to defeat Menthu and Isis and rescue Cassandra.

== Reception ==
=== Box office ===
The Scorpion King grossed $12,553,380 on its opening day and $36,075,875 in total over the weekend, from 3,444 theaters in the United States and Canada for an average of $10,475 per venue, ranking at number one at the US box office. The film had the largest April opening weekend at that time, beating The Matrix. This record would only last for a year before being surpassed by Anger Management in 2003. Internationally, it grossed $10 million in its first five days from 1,097 screens, and was number one in nine of the 11 territories it opened in, including setting a record non-holiday opening in Singapore with a gross of $591,000. Grosses in the United States and Canada dropped 50 percent in the second weekend, but the film remained at number one, grossing another $18,038,270. Internationally, it expanded to 35 markets and grossed $12 million. The film closed on June 27, 2002, with a total domestic gross of $91,047,077, and an additional $87,752,231 internationally, for a total worldwide gross of $178,799,308, against a budget of $60 million, making it a moderate box office success.

=== Critical response ===
The Scorpion King holds a 40% approval rating on Rotten Tomatoes, based on 134 reviews, with an average rating of 4.9/10. The site's critical consensus states, "Action adventure doesn't get much cheesier than The Scorpion King." Metacritic gave the film a weighted average score of 45 out of 100, based on 30 reviews. Audiences polled by CinemaScore gave the film an average grade of B, on a scale of A+ to F.

Roger Ebert, film critic of the Chicago Sun-Times, gave the film 3 out of 4 stars, writing "Here is a movie that embraces its goofiness like a Get Out of Jail Free card. The plot is recycled out of previous recycling jobs, the special effects are bad enough that you can grin at them, and the dialogue sounds like the pre-Pyramidal desert warriors are channeling a Fox sitcom... For its target audience, looking for a few laughs, martial arts and stuff that blows up real good, it will be exactly what they expected. It has high energy, the action never stops, the dialogue knows it's funny, and The Rock has the authority to play the role and the fortitude to keep a straight face. I expect him to become a durable action star."

James Berardinelli of ReelViews gave the film two stars (out of four), saying: "It's possible to make an engaging action/adventure picture of this sort, but The Scorpion King isn't it." Dennis Harvey of Variety gave a positive review, saying the film "rouses excitement mostly from stuntwork and [actors'] agility rather than CGI excess." Nathan Rabin of The Onion's A.V. Club gave the film a mildly positive review, calling it "prototypical summer-movie fare, designed to be consumed, enjoyed, and forgotten all at once." Owen Gleiberman of Entertainment Weekly gave the film a score of C+, calling it "plodding and obvious" but adding that The Rock "holds it together." Jonathan Foreman of the New York Post gave a negative review, saying that The Scorpion King "has none of the qualities—epic sweep, relative originality and heartfelt bloodthirstiness—that made Conan so trashily entertaining."

=== Accolades ===
The film was nominated for Best Fantasy Film at the Saturn Awards, but lost to The Lord of the Rings: The Two Towers (also starred Bernard Hill).

== Historical accuracy ==
The Scorpion King blends historical inspiration with imaginative storytelling, resulting in a fictionalized portrayal of ancient Egypt. While the film draws from mythological and historical elements, it prioritizes adventure and fantasy over historical accuracy.

The character Mathayus, played by Dwayne Johnson, is loosely inspired by King Scorpion, a ruler from ancient Egypt's Predynastic Period. King Scorpion is believed to have played a key role in consolidating power in southern Egypt before the unification of Upper and Lower Egypt, which marked the beginning of the First Dynastic Period (3150–2613 BCE). Some historians associate King Scorpion with King Narmer, credited with uniting Egypt, though this connection remains speculative. Archaeological findings, such as the Scorpion Tableau discovered at Gebel Tjauti in 1995, provide evidence of King Scorpion's existence. The film's story of uniting Egypt's tribes echoes Narmer's historical unification of Upper and Lower Egypt but remains largely fictional, prioritizing myth and adventure.

In the film, Mathayus is depicted as an Akkadian assassin tasked with defeating Memnon, a tyrant attempting to control the fragmented tribes of Egypt. This portrayal significantly diverges from historical accounts of King Scorpion. While the historical figure's association with scorpions comes from depictions on artifacts like the Narmer Palette, the film invents a fictional backstory involving scorpion venom to symbolize Mathayus's connection to the creature.

Other elements in the film are entirely fictional. Cassandra, a sorceress with prophetic powers, and Memnon, the primary antagonist, have no historical counterparts. While ancient Egyptian rulers are known to have consulted oracles, Cassandra's supernatural abilities were created to enhance the film's fantasy elements. Similarly, there is no historical evidence of a ruler named Memnon opposing King Scorpion.

Director Chuck Russell acknowledged that the film prioritized visual appeal over historical accuracy. Modern elements, such as bikini waxing for characters, were included to enhance aesthetics, aligning with some ancient Egyptian grooming practices. Egyptians often wore transparent clothing suited to the climate and removed body hair using methods such as plucking, though specific details remain uncertain.

The release of The Scorpion King coincided with increased public interest in the historical King Scorpion. This was further fueled by the History Channel documentary The Real Scorpion King, which aired in April 2002. A spokesperson for Universal Pictures clarified that the film's story was unrelated to the historical King Scorpion or archaeological discoveries.

== Soundtrack ==
The Scorpion King

Soundtrack album by Various artists
- Released: March 26, 2002
- Genres: Nu metal; alternative metal
- Length: 1:00:41
- Label: Universal
- Producer: Various artists

Singles from The Scorpion King
- 1. "I Stand Alone" Released: February 2002

Professional ratings
Review scores
Source	Rating
Allmusic	2/5 stars

The soundtrack to The Scorpion King was released on March 26, 2002, just before the film. It contains tracks from various bands performing either previously released tracks or their B-sides. The album has been certified Gold by the RIAA.
The 14-track score for the film, composed by John Debney, was released separately.

Track listing
No.	Title	Writer(s)	Producer(s)	Length
1.	"I Stand Alone" (Godsmack)	Sully Erna	David Bottrill; Sully Erna^{[a]}	4:05
2.	"Set It Off (Tweaker remix)" (P.O.D.)	P.O.D.	Howard Benson; P.O.D.^{[a]}; Chris Vrenna^{[b]}	4:10
3.	"Break You" (Drowning Pool)	Drowning Pool	Jay Baumgardner	2:48
4.	"Streamline" (System of a Down)	Serj Tankian^{[c]}^{[d]}; Daron Malakian^{[d]}	Rick Rubin	3:36
5.	"To Whom It May Concern" (Creed)	Mark Tremonti; Scott Stapp	John Kurzweg	5:09
6.	"Yanking Out My Heart" (Nickelback)	Chad Kroeger^{[c]}; Nickelback^{[d]}	Rick Parashar; Nickelback	3:35
7.	"Losing My Grip" (Hoobastank)	Doug Robb; Daniel Estrin; Markku Lappalainen; Chris Hesse	Jim Wirt	3:55
8.	"Only the Strong" (Flaw)	Chris Volz^{[c]}; Flaw^{[d]}	Bottrill	4:17
9.	"Iron Head" ( Rob Zombie featuring Ozzy Osbourne)	Rob Zombie; Mike Riggs; Scott Humphrey	Scott Humphrey; Rob Zombie	4:10
10.	"My Life" (12 Stones)	12 Stones	Baumgardner; Dave Fortman^{[a]}	3:03
11.	"Along the Way" (Mushroomhead)	Steve Felton; Jeffrey Hatrix; Tom Schmitz; Jason Popson; Jack Kilcoyne; Dave Felton; Marko Vukcevich	Steve Felton; Mushroomhead	3:17
12.	"Breathless" (Lifer)	Nick Coyle^{[c]}; Lifer^{[d]}	Alex Lifeson	4:04
13.	"Corrected" (Sevendust)	Lajon Witherspoon^{[c]}; John Connolly^{[c]}; Clint Lowery^{[c]}; Morgan Rose^{[c]}; Sevendust^{[d]}	Ben Grosse; Sevendust	4:31
14.	"Burn It Black" (Injected)	Injected	Butch Walker	2:42
15.	"27" (Breaking Point)	Justin Rimer; Brett Erickson	Paul Ebersold^{[a]}; Matt Martone^{[a]}	3:38
16.	"Glow" (Coal Chamber)	B. Dez Fafara^{[c]}^{[d]}; Miguel Rascon^{[d]}; Rayna Foss-Rose^{[d]}; Mike Cox^{[d]}	Ross Hogarth	3:06
Total length:				1:00:41

Notes

- ^{^[a]} signifies a co-producer
- ^{^[b]} signifies an additional producer
- ^{^[c]} signifies a lyricist
- ^{^[d]} signifies a music composer

=== Weekly charts ===
Weekly chart performance for The Scorpion King
Chart (2002)	Position
Austrian Albums (Ö3 Austria)	18
Canadian Albums (Billboard)	12
German Albums (Offizielle Top 100)	38
New Zealand Albums (RMNZ)	25

=== Year-end charts ===
Year-end chart performance for The Scorpion King
Chart (2002)	Position
Canadian Albums (Nielsen SoundScan)	160
Canadian Alternative Albums (Nielsen SoundScan)	52
Canadian Metal Albums (Nielsen SoundScan)	26

=== Certifications ===
Region	Certification	Certified units/sales
United States (RIAA)	Gold	500,000^{^}
^{^} Shipments figures based on certification alone.

== Franchise ==
=== Prequel ===
Following the film's release, there were plans for a sequel with Johnson to return as Mathayus and go up against a new villain, Sargon, but these plans eventually fell through and the project was shelved. A direct-to-video prequel, The Scorpion King 2: Rise of a Warrior, was released in 2008 with Michael Copon as Mathayus and Randy Couture as Sargon.

=== Sequels ===
A sequel, The Scorpion King 3: Battle for Redemption, was released in 2012 with Victor Webster as Mathayus and Billy Zane as the villain, King Talus. The fourth film in the franchise, The Scorpion King 4: Quest for Power, was released in 2015. Webster reprised his role, while Michael Biehn, Rutger Hauer, Lou Ferrigno, and former WWE wrestler Eve Torres joined the cast. Will Kemp portrayed the villain, Drazen.

A fifth and final film, Scorpion King: Book of Souls, was released in 2018. Zach McGowan played Mathayus, while Peter Mensah portrayed the villain, Nebserek.

=== Reboot ===
In November 2020, a reboot of The Scorpion King film series was announced to be in development. Jonathan Herman will serve as screenwriter, with the plot taking place in the modern-day or in the 31st-century, involving a contemporary adaptation of the Mathayus of Akkad / Scorpion King character. Dwayne Johnson will serve as producer alongside Dany Garcia and Hiram Garcia. The project will be a joint-venture production between Universal Pictures and Seven Bucks Productions. Hiram Garcia later gave an update on it a year later saying it was still in development.
