= The Righteous & the Butterfly =

Studio album by Mushroomhead
- Released: May 13, 2014
- Recorded: 2012–2013
- Studio: Filthy Hands Studio
- Genre: Industrial metal, nu metal
- Length: 51:04
- Label: Megaforce
- Producer: Steve Felton, Bill Korecky

Mushroomhead chronology
Beautiful Stories for Ugly Children (2010)	The Righteous & the Butterfly (2014)	A Wonderful Life (2020)

Singles from The Righteous & the Butterfly
- 1. "Qwerty" Released: April 15, 2014; 2. "Out of My Mind" Released: May 27, 2014

The Righteous & the Butterfly is the seventh studio album by American heavy metal band Mushroomhead. It was released on May 13, 2014.

== Background ==
It is the band's first studio album since 2003's XIII to feature Jason "J Mann" Popson on vocals, and the last to feature Jeffrey Hatrix and Waylon Reavis on vocals and Tom Schmitz on keyboards. It is also their first album without Jack Kilcoyne on bass since Superbuick, and Dave Felton on guitar since XIII, as well as the first album to feature Ryan Farrell on bass, Robbie Godsey on percussion and drums and the only to feature Tommy Church on guitar.

Jeffrey Hatrix said about the members' departure: "We also parted ways with a couple of members who didn't share in the founding members' vision of what Mushroomhead was always meant to be. Pig and Gravy both saw our future in a far different way".

The album title is a dedication to original guitarist John Sekula and drummer Steve Felton's former wife Vanessa Solowiow, both of whom had died in 2010 and 2013 respectively.

In September 2012, Mushroomhead announced that they are currently in the studio working on new music via their Facebook fan page. It was said by Mushroomhead frontman Jeffrey Nothing that former Slipknot and current Painface vocalist Anders Colsefni is in the works to do a recording together in their upcoming studio sessions. The band entered their own Filthy Hands Studio in December 2012 to begin writing and recording their next studio album.

The album is the first and only to showcase all three male vocalists. Drummer Felton described it as "very energetic, dark and by far their heaviest album to date, just a fresh spin on the same old thing if you will. This is the first record with Church on guitar and Farrell on bass, so having those new writers on board you never know where it's going to go. For the old school fans there's a lot of flavorful elements in it so they will definitely enjoy it." The album was revealed to come out around early 2014.

On August 16, Jason Popson confirmed his return to the band on his personal Facebook.

Mushroomhead toured Australia for the first time as part of the Soundwave Festival 2014, in which they debuted the song We Are the Truth.

On February 14, 2014, Mushroomhead announced a release date of May 13, 2014, of the album along with the title, The Righteous & the Butterfly. The album marks the return of Jason Popson. On April 15, 2014, clean vocalist Jeff Hatrix released the band's first unofficial single "Qwerty" on YouTube from his personal Facebook account, marking the first song featuring Popson since rejoining the band.

Music videos for "Our Apologies", "Devils Be Damned", "Qwerty", "We Are the Truth", "Graveyard Du Jour", & "Out of My Mind" were released.

== Reception ==
Professional ratings
Review scores
Source	Rating
About.com	4/5 stars
Blabbermouth.net	8/10
Campus Circle	B
Mouth4music Magazine	4.75/5 stars
New Noise Magazine	4/5 stars
New Transcendence	7.5/10
Screamer Magazine	8.5/10
Shakefire.com	A
The Front Row Report	9.5/10

The album received mostly positive reviews and is Mushroomhead's first album to reach the top 20 of the Billboard Top 200 chart in the United States, reaching No. 20, selling over 11,000 copies the first week. The album also, reached No. 1 in the Billboard Indie chart, their first album to do so. The Righteous & the Butterfly also, reached No. 5 in the Top Rock Albums and No. 1 in the Top Hard Rock Albums.

== Track listing ==
All tracks are written by Mushroomhead.

No.	Title	Length
1.	"Our Apologies"	3:24
2.	"How Many Times"	4:50
3.	"Devils Be Damned"	3:16
4.	"Qwerty"	3:30
5.	"Portraits of the Poor"	3:31
6.	"Childlike" (feat. Jus Mic of 10,000 Cadillacs)	1:45
7.	"This Cold Reign"	4:04
8.	"We Are the Truth" (feat. Jackie Laponza of Unsaid Fate)	4:05
9.	"Son of 7"	3:29
10.	"For Your Pleasure"	4:12
11.	"Worlds Collide"	4:19
12.	"Graveyard Du Jour"	3:20
13.	"Out of My Mind"	3:35
14.	"Rumor Has It" (Adele cover)	3:39

Best Buy bonus tracks
No.	Title	Length
15.	"We Are the Truth 3.0"	3:43
16.	"Dope Ass Watt [Remix]"	3:01
17.	"Watt (DG Mix)"	2:34
Total length:		60:22

== Personnel ==
=== Mushroomhead ===
- Jeffrey Hatrix – vocals
- Waylon Reavis – vocals
- Jason Popson – vocals
- Tommy Church – guitars
- Ryan Farrell – bass, keyboards
- Tom Schmitz – keyboards, samples
- Rick Thomas – samples, percussion
- Steve Felton – drums
- Robbie Godsey – drums (tracks 2–4, 9, 10, 12), percussion, water drums

=== Guests ===
- Jus Mic – vocals (track 6)
- Jackie LaPonza – vocals (tracks 8, 15–17)
