= List of Mushroomhead band members =

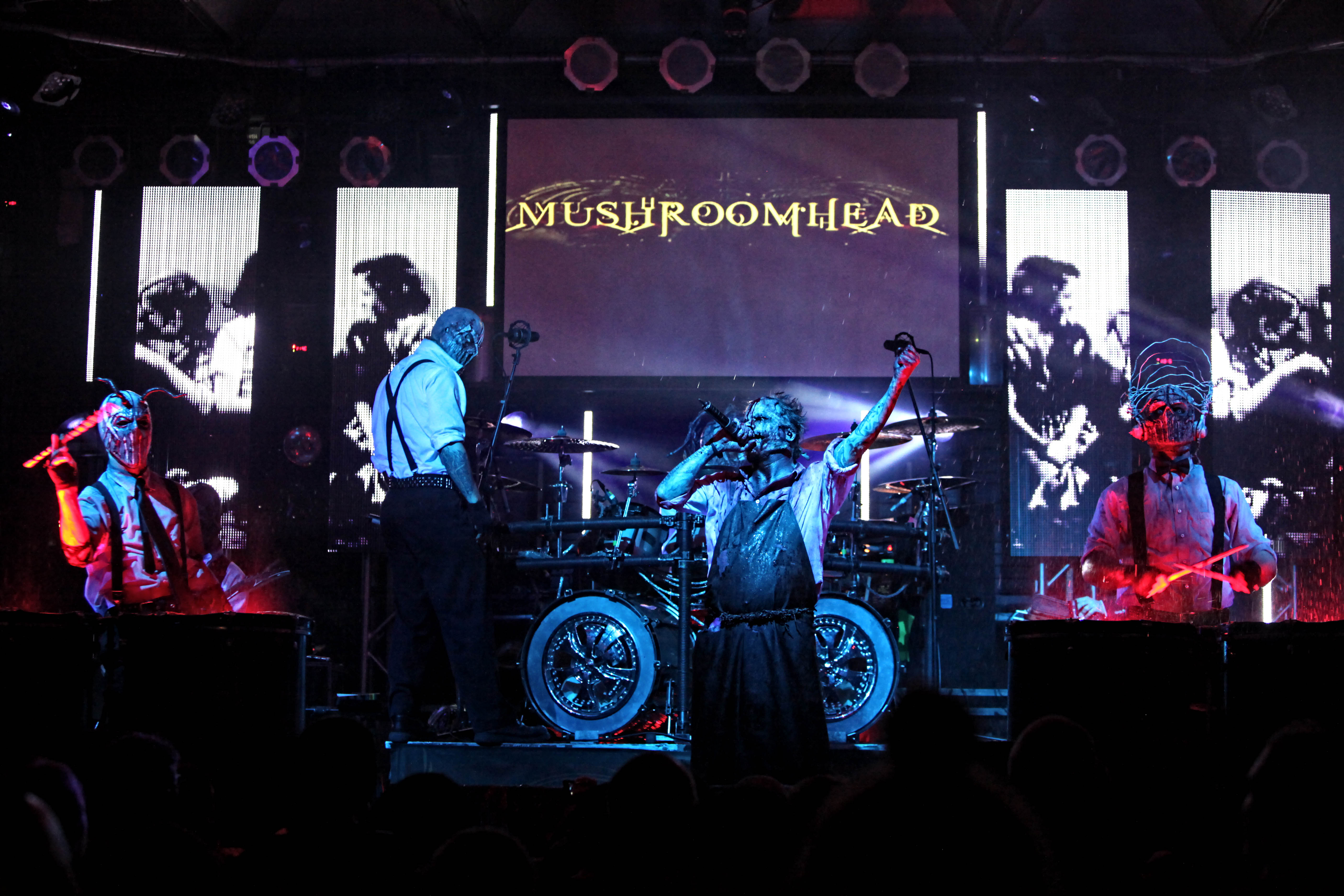
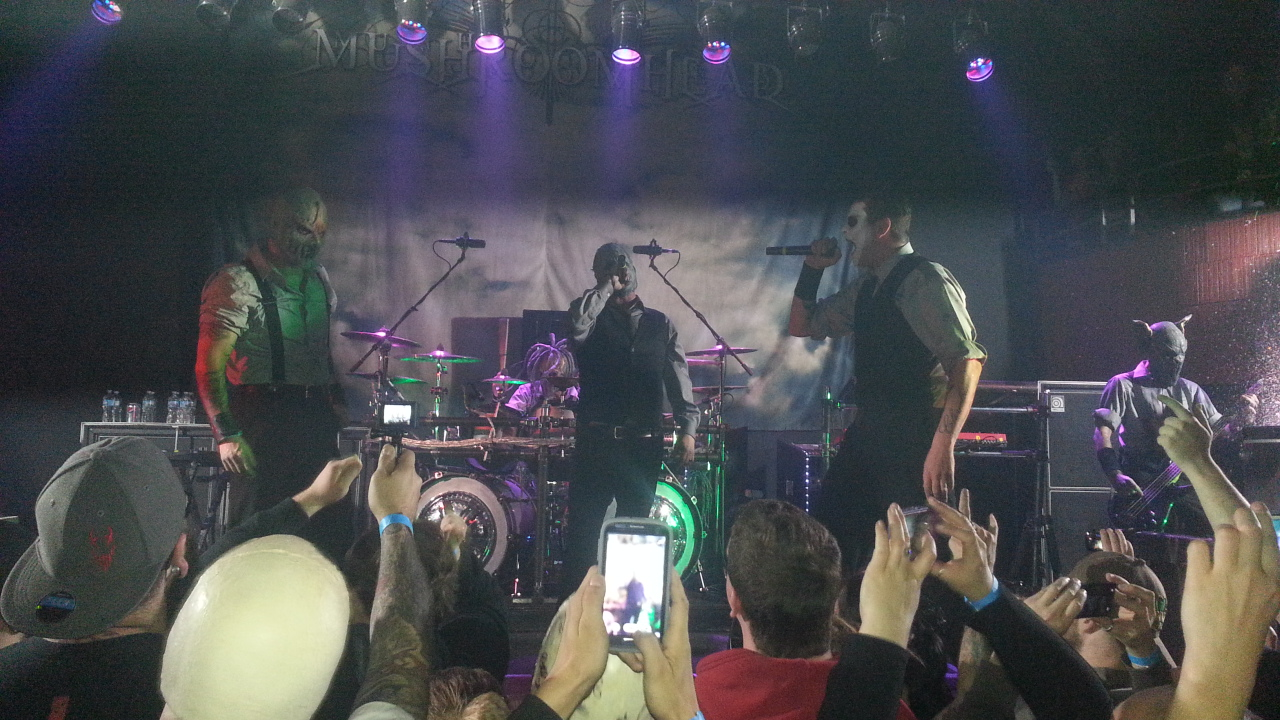
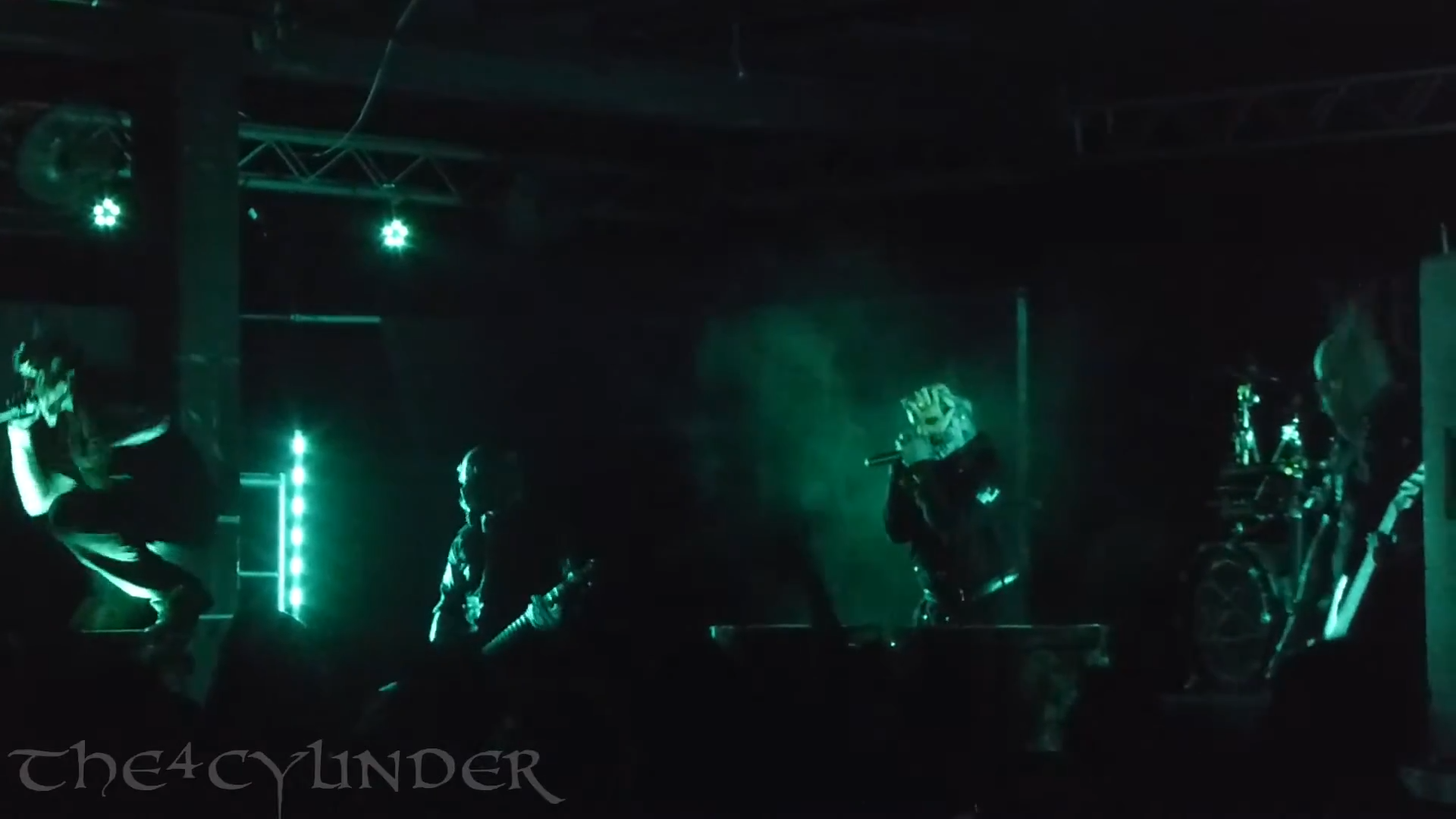
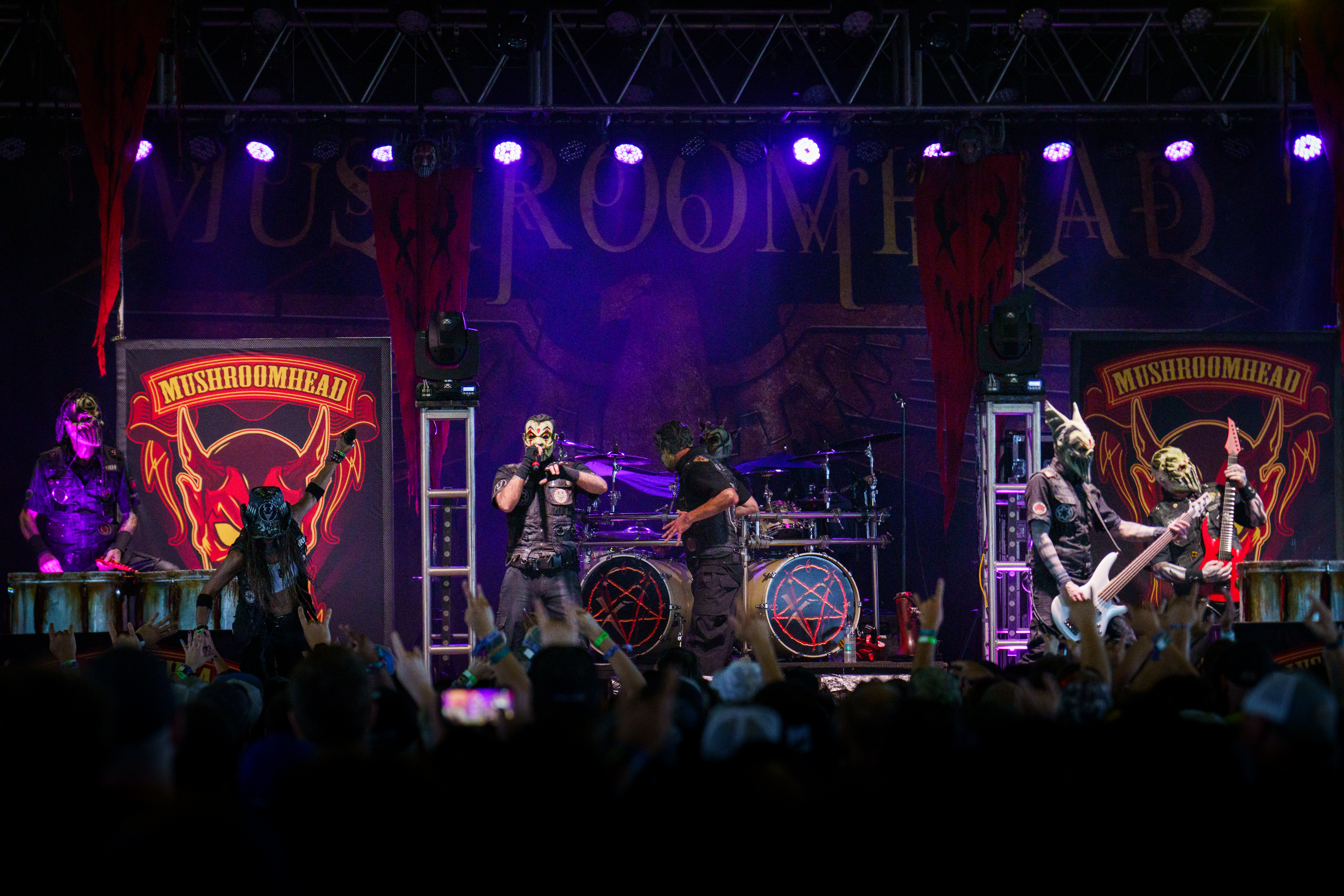
Four line-ups of Mushroomhead in 2013, 2014, 2016 and 2023.

Mushroomhead are an American alternative metal band, they have undergone many lineup changes, leading every studio album to have a different lineup, with the only constant member being drummer, percussionist, water drummer, keyboardist, DJ, producer and director Steve "Skinny" Felton. Their lineup currently consists of Felton, vocalists Jackie LaPonza, Steve Rauckhorst and Scott "Strike" Beck, guitarists Dave "Gravy" Felton and Joe "Jenkins" Gaal, bassist Joel Karschner, percussionist Robert "Roberto Diablo" Godsey, drummer Aydin "Aylien" Michael and touring water drummer Jordan Gannon.

== History ==
The band was founded in 1993 by vocalists Jeff "Nothing" Hatrix and Jason "J Mann" Popson, guitarists John "JJ Righteous" Sekula and Richie "Dinner" Moore, bassist Joe "Mr. Murdernickel" Kilcoyne, keyboardist Tom "Shmotz" Schmitz, drummer Steve "Skinny" Felton and DJ Joe "DJ Virus" Lenkey. Promo photos & live performances also featured dancers Jessica "Roxy" Haney and Marko "Bronson" Vukcevich, the former also doing merch & art, the latter also being video editor, alongside hired talent such as fire-breathers and gymnasts.

After releasing a demo and their self-titled debut album, Joe Kilcoyne left in late 1995 and was replaced by his brother, Jack "Pig Benis" Kilcoyne. Joe Lenkey departed the band in early 1998, and was replaced by Bronson. Next to depart was guitarist Richie Moore, who was replaced by Skinny's brother Dave "Gravy" Felton. JJ Righteous also left a year later, in his absence, Bronson moved to guitar, and Rick "St1tch" Thomas joined as DJ, moving to more experimental electronics by 2003.

In mid 2004, Jason Popson left the band to take care of his estranged terminally-ill father. He was replaced by Waylon "Wizlo" Reavis. Bronson departed in May 2006 to study film production, he was not replaced, meaning the band had only one guitarist, however, he contributed songwritting to 2 songs from the Savior Sorrow album before his departure. Later in 2006, they incorporated water drums into their show and were joined by touring water drummer Daniel "Lil' Dan" Fox, who later became an official member in 2009 with St1tch and Skinny gradually becoming more prevalent on the instrument as well.

In February 2012, Dave Felton was fired via mail, Pig Benis left to concentrate on his family life and Lil Dan left some months later to work as a touring drummer and drum tech for Marilyn Manson and Dope. They were replaced by Tommy Church, Ryan "Dr. F" Farrell and Robert "Roberto Diablo" Godsey respectively. Dr. F had previously contributed to additional songwritting for the previous 2 albums in the studio. Popson also returned in August 2013 for the band's 20th anniversary, performing vocals alongside Hatrix, Reavis, and Skinny's then wife Jackie LaPonza as a touring female vocalist.

Schmitz departed in 2015 causing turmoil within the band, leading to Reavis being fired after a heated altercation with both Skinny and Stitch, and hinting that Mushroomhead operated as a dictatorship run by Skinny and Stitch under his wing. The former members weren't replaced, St1tch sampled and programmed Shmotz pre-recorded keyboard parts live, eventually splitting duties with Skinny while Dr. F took the role of keyboards songwritting chief in studio, with Hatrix and Popson continuing as dual vocalists. Hatrix and Church both departed in March 2018 as a result of further conflict. They were replaced by their former tour roadies Steve Rauckhorst and Tommy "Tankx" Shaffner respectively. LaPonza went on hiatus and Shaffner departed in mid-2021, the latter being replaced by Joe "Jenkins" Gaal.

In 2022, J Mann and ST1TCH went on touring hiatus and Skinny suffered back injuries. As such the line-up was reworked to feature Skinny as both DJ and water drummer in addition to visual design, new members Scott Beck and Aydin Michael joined as a new vocalist and drummer respectively, and onstage Jordan Gannon became a touring water drummer. The band were also rejoined by Gravy, returning as an occasional touring guitarist and returning to a dual guitarist line-up. Gravy and LaPonza's return, Popson's retirement and Skinny's reconciliation with Reavis are considered indicators of the winding-down of conflict, however tensions still exist between the band, Hatrix and Church. As such, in 2024, following the announcement of Call the Devil, Hatrix attempted to form 'Jeffrey Nothing's Mushroomhead', composed of other former members of the band, confirming members Church and Marko "Bronson" Vukcevich.

On August 16, 2024, it was reported that Jeffrey Nothing had filed a lawsuit against Felton in regard to unpaid royalties and copyright infringement. Nothing's attorney Ronald Stanley alleged that Felton had siphoned income under the alias of 'Tenafly Viper' as well as an unknown publicist and unknown writer. Stanley claims Nothing is owed at least $3.5 million and is entitled to use of band insignia. As of February 9, 2026, the lawsuit was settled out of court, with Hatrix claiming that Felton "came to the table amicably and honorably and we found a solution that made both of us happy." Hatrix further stated of his relationship with Felton that "from here on out it's nothing but positivity in that direction. I said I was done with drama and I meant it.

In March 2025, Godsey was replaced by Simon Kanaris. In July 2026, Ryan Farrel was replaced by Joel Karschner.

== Members ==
=== Current ===
Image	Real name (stage name)	Years active	Instruments	Release contributions
	Steve Felton (Skinny)	1993–present	keyboards; samples; water drums; drums; percussion; production; visual direction	all releases
	Dave Felton (Gravy)	2000–2012; 2022–present	guitars	all releases from XX (2001) to Beautiful Stories for Ugly Children (2010) and from Call the Devil (2024) to present
	Jaqueline La Ponza (Ms. Jackie)	2013–present (hiatus 2021)	vocals	all releases from The Righteous & the Butterfly (2014) to present
	Steve Rauckhorst	2018–present	vocals; bass (touring 2007)	all releases from Volume 3 (Video Album) (2018) to present
	Joe Gaal (Jenkins)	2021–present	guitars	all releases from A Requiem for Tomorrow (2021 music video) to present
	Aydin Kerr (Alien)	2019 (touring); 2022–present	drums; percussion	all releases from Call the Devil (2024) to present
	Scott Beck (Strike)	2022–present	vocals	all releases from Call the Devil (2024) to present
	Jordan Gannon	2022–present	water drums	none
	Simon Kanaris	2025–present	water drums	none
	Joel Karschner	2026-present	bass	none

=== Former ===
Image	Real name (stage name)	Years active	Instruments	Release contributions
	Jeffrey Hatrix (Jeffrey Nothing)	1993–2018	vocals	all releases from Mushroomhead 4 Song Demo (1993) to The Righteous & the Butterfly (2014)
	Tom Schmitz (Shmotz)	1993–2015	keyboards; samples	all releases from Mushroomhead 4 Song Demo (1993) to The Righteous & the Butterfly (2014)
	John Sekula (JJ Righteous)	1993–2001 (died 2010)	guitars	all releases from Mushroomhead 4 Song Demo (1993) to XX (2001)
	Jason Popson (J Mann)	1993–2004; 2013–2022	vocals	all releases from Mushroomhead 4 Song Demo (1993) to XIII (2003), and from The Righteous & the Butterfly (2014) to A Wonderful Life (2020)
	Joe Kilcoyne (Mr. Murdernickel)	1993–1995	bass	all releases from Mushroomhead 4 Song Demo (1993) to Mushroomhead (1995) and XX (2001)
	Richie Moore (Dinner)	1993–2000	guitars	all releases from Mushroomhead 4 Song Demo (1993) to M3 (1999)
	Joe Lenkey (DJ Virus)	1993–1999	turntables; samplers; electronics	all releases from Mushroomhead 4 Song Demo (1993) to Home Video (Video Album) (1997) and XX (2001)
	Jack Kilcoyne (Pig Benis)	1995–2012	bass	all releases from Superbuick (1996) to Beautiful Stories for Ugly Children (2010)
	Marko Vukcevich (Bronson)	1999–2006	turntables; samples; electronics (1999-2001); guitars (2001-2006); visual production (1993-1999); dancer (1993-1999 live)	all releases from M3 (1999) to XIII (2003)
	Rick Thomas (St1tch)	2001–2022	samples; electronics; keyboards (2013–2022); water drums (2007–2022); turntables (2001–2003)	all releases from XX (2001) to A Wonderful Life (2020)
	Waylon Reavis (Wizlo)	2004–2015	vocals	all releases from Savior Sorrow (2006) to The Righteous & the Butterfly (2014)
	Daniel Fox (Lil' Dan)	2009–2012 (touring 2006–2009)	percussion; drums	Your Soul Is Mine (2009) and Beautiful Stories for Ugly Children (2010)
	Robert Lewis Godsey IV (Roberto Diablo)	2012–2025	percussion; drums	all releases from The Righteous & the Butterfly (2014) to present
	Ryan Farrell (Dr. F)	2012–2026	bass; keyboards (studio 2006–2026); guitars (2022–2026 studio only)	all releases from Savior Sorrow (2006) to Call the Devil (2024)
	Tommy Church	2012–2018	guitars	The Righteous & the Butterfly (2014)
	Tom Shaffner (Tankx)	2018–2021	guitars	A Wonderful Life (2020)

== Timelines ==
=== Recording timeline ===
Role	Album									
Role	Mushroomhead (1995)	Superbuick (1996)	M3 (1999)	XX (2001)	XIII (2003)	Savior Sorrow (2006)	Beautiful Stories for Ugly Children (2010)	The Righteous & the Butterfly (2014)	A Wonderful Life (2020)	Call The Devil (2024)
Vocals	Jeffrey Hatrix	Jeffrey Hatrix	Jeffrey Hatrix	Jeffrey Hatrix	Jeffrey Hatrix	Jeffrey Hatrix	Jeffrey Hatrix	Jeffrey Hatrix	Steve Rauckhorst	Steve Rauckhorst
Vocals	Jason Popson	Jason Popson	Jason Popson	Jason Popson	Jason Popson			Jason Popson	Jason Popson	Scott Beck
Vocals	Jason Popson	Jason Popson	Jason Popson	Jason Popson	Jason Popson	Waylon Reavis	Waylon Reavis	Waylon Reavis		Scott Beck
Vocals	Jason Popson	Jason Popson	Jason Popson	Jason Popson	Jason Popson			Jackie LaPonza	Jackie LaPonza	Jackie LaPonza
Guitars	Richie Moore	Richie Moore	Richie Moore	Dave Felton	Dave Felton	Dave Felton	Dave Felton	Tommy Church	Tom Shaffner	Dave Felton
Guitars	Richie Moore	Richie Moore	Richie Moore	Dave Felton	Dave Felton	Dave Felton	Dave Felton	Tommy Church	Tom Shaffner	Joe Gaal
Guitars	John Sekula	John Sekula	John Sekula	John Sekula	Marko Vukcevich	Marko Vukcevich		Tommy Church	Ryan Farrell	Ryan Farrell
Bass	Joe Kilcoyne	Jack Kilcoyne	Jack Kilcoyne	Jack Kilcoyne	Jack Kilcoyne	Jack Kilcoyne	Jack Kilcoyne	Ryan Farrell	Ryan Farrell	Ryan Farrell
Drums, percussion	Steve Felton	Steve Felton	Steve Felton	Steve Felton	Steve Felton	Steve Felton	Steve Felton	Steve Felton	Steve Felton	Ayden Kerr
Drums, percussion							Daniel Fox	Robbie Godsey	Robbie Godsey	Robbie Godsey
Water drums, additional percussion, supporting drums							Daniel Fox	Robbie Godsey	Robbie Godsey	Robbie Godsey
Water drums, additional percussion, supporting drums							Rick Thomas	Rick Thomas	Rick Thomas	Steve Felton
Turntables, electronics, samples	Joe Lenkey	Joe Lenkey	Marko Vukcevich	Marko Vukcevich	Rick Thomas	Rick Thomas	Rick Thomas	Rick Thomas	Rick Thomas	Steve Felton
Production	Joe Lenkey	Joe Lenkey	Marko Vukcevich	Marko Vukcevich	Rick Thomas	Rick Thomas	Rick Thomas	Rick Thomas	Rick Thomas	Steve Felton
Production	Steve Felton	Steve Felton	Steve Felton	Steve Felton	Steve Felton	Steve Felton	Steve Felton	Steve Felton	Steve Felton	Steve Felton
Keyboards	Tom Schmitz	Tom Schmitz	Tom Schmitz	Tom Schmitz	Tom Schmitz	Tom Schmitz	Tom Schmitz	Tom Schmitz	Rick Thomas	Steve Felton
Keyboards						Dave Felton	Dave Felton	Steve Felton	Steve Felton	Steve Felton
Keyboards						Ryan Farrell	Ryan Farrell	Ryan Farrell	Ryan Farrell	Ryan Farrell

== Line-ups ==
Please note this pertains only to members constant to both studio and live line-ups.

Period	Members	Releases
1993	Jeff "Nothing" Hatrix – clean vocals; John "JJ Righteous" Sekula – guitars; Steve "Skinny" Felton – drums, percussion; Tom "Shmotz" Schmitz – keyboards, samples	None - recorded 3 songs
1993–1995	Jeff "Nothing" Hatrix – clean vocals; Jason "J Mann" Popson – rap/harsh vocals; John "JJ Righteous" Sekula – guitars; Richie "Dinner" Moore – guitars; Joe "Mr. Murdernickel" Kilcoyne – bass; Steve "Skinny" Felton – drums, percussion; Tom "Shmotz" Schmitz – keyboards, samples; Joe "DJ Virus" Lenkey – samples, turntables, programming	Mushroomhead 4 Song Demo (1994); Mushroomhead (1995)
1995–1999	Jeff "Nothing" Hatrix – clean vocals; Jason "J Mann" Popson – rap/harsh vocals; John "JJ Righteous" Sekula – guitars; Richie "Dinner" Moore – guitars; Jack "Pig Benis" Kilcoyne – bass; Steve "Skinny" Felton – drums, percussion; Tom "Shmotz" Schmitz – keyboards, samples; Joe "DJ Virus" Lenkey – samples, turntables, programming	Superbuick (1996); Remix (1997)
1999–2000	Jeff "Nothing" Hatrix – clean vocals; Jason "J Mann" Popson – rap/harsh vocals; John "JJ Righteous" Sekula – guitars; Richie "Dinner" Moore – guitars; Jack "Pig Benis" Kilcoyne – bass; Steve "Skinny" Felton – drums, percussion; Tom "Shmotz" Schmitz – keyboards, samples; Marko "Bronson" Vukcevich – samples, turntables, programming	M3 (1999)
2000–2001	Jeff "Nothing" Hatrix – clean vocals; Jason "J Mann" Popson – rap/harsh vocals; John "JJ Righteous" Sekula – guitars; Dave "Gravy" Felton – guitars; Jack "Pig Benis" Kilcoyne – bass; Steve "Skinny" Felton – drums, percussion; Tom "Shmotz" Schmitz – keyboards, samples; Marko "Bronson" Vukcevich electronics, samples, turntables	XX (2000)
2001–2004	Jeff "Nothing" Hatrix – clean vocals; Jason "J Mann" Popson – rap/harsh vocals; Dave "Gravy" Felton – guitars; Jack "Pig Benis" Kilcoyne – bass; Steve "Skinny" Felton – drums, percussion; Tom "Shmotz" Schmitz – keyboards, samples; Marko "Bronson" Vukcevich – guitars; Rick "ST1TCH" Thomas – electronics, samples, turntables	Remix 2000 (2002); XIII (2003)
2004–2007	Jeff "Nothing" Hatrix – clean/harsh vocals; Waylon Reavis – harsh/rap vocals; Dave "Gravy" Felton – guitars; Jack "Pig Benis" Kilcoyne – bass; Steve "Skinny" Felton – drums, percussion; Tom "Shmotz" Schmitz – keyboards; Marko "Bronson" Vukcevich – guitars; Rick "ST1TCH" Thomas – electronics, samples	Savior Sorrow (2006)
2007–2012	Jeff "Nothing" Hatrix – clean/harsh vocals; Waylon Reavis – harsh/rap vocals; Dave "Gravy" Felton – guitars; Jack "Pig Benis" Kilcoyne – bass; Steve "Skinny" Felton – drums, percussion, water drums; Tom "Shmotz" Schmitz – keyboards; Rick "ST1TCH" Thomas – electronics, samples, water drums; Daniel "Lil' Dan" Fox – water drums, additional percussion	Your Soul Is Mine (2009); Beautiful Stories for Ugly Children (2010)
2012–2015	Jeff "Nothing" Hatrix – clean vocals, harsh vocals; Jason "J Mann" Popson – harsh/rap vocals; Waylon Reavis – clean/harsh/rap vocals; Jackie "Ms. Jackie" LaPonza – clean vocals; Tommy Church – guitars; Ryan "Dr. F" Farrell – bass, keyboards (studio only); Steve "Skinny" Felton – drums, percussion, water drums; Tom "Shmotz" Schmitz – keyboards; Rick "ST1TCH" Thomas – electronics, samples, turntables, water drums; Robbie "Roberto Diablo" Godsey – water drums, drums, additional percussion	The Righteous & the Butterfly (2014)
2015–2018	Jeff "Nothing" Hatrix – clean/harsh vocals; Jason "J Mann" Popson – harsh vocals/rap vocals; Jackie "Ms. Jackie" LaPonza – clean vocals; Tommy Church – guitars; Ryan "Dr. F" Farrell – bass, keyboards; Steve "Skinny" Felton – drums, percussion, water drums, keyboards, samples; Rick "ST1TCH" Thomas – keyboards, electronics, samples, turntables, water drums; Robbie "Roberto Diablo" Godsey – water drums, drums, additional percussion	none
2018–2020	Steve Rauckhorst – clean vocals; Jason "J Mann" Popson – harsh/rap vocals; Jackie "Ms. Jackie" LaPonza – clean vocals; Tommy "Tankx" Shaffner – guitars; Ryan "Dr. F" Farrell – bass, keyboards; Steve "Skinny" Felton – drums, percussion, water drums, keyboards, samples; Rick "ST1TCH" Thomas – keyboards, electronics, samples, turntables, water drums; Robbie "Roberto Diablo" Godsey – water drums, drums, additional percussion	none
2020–early 2021	Steve "Mr. Rauckhorst" Rauckhorst – clean vocals; Jackie "Ms. Jackie" LaPonza – clean vocals; Jason "J Mann" Popson – harsh vocals, rap vocals; Tommy "Tankx" Shaffner – guitars; Ryan "Dr. F" Farrell – bass, keyboards; Steve "Skinny" Felton – drums, percussion, water drums, keyboards, samples; Rick "ST1TCH" Thomas – keyboards, electronics, samples, turntables, water drums; Robbie "Roberto Diablo" Godsey – water drums, drums, additional percussion	A Wonderful Life (2020)
Early–late 2021	Steve Rauckhorst – clean vocals; Jason "J Mann" Popson – harsh/rap vocals; Tommy "Tankx" Shaffner – guitars; Ryan "Dr. F" Farrell – bass, keyboards; Steve "Skinny" Felton – drums, percussion, water drums, keyboards, samples; Rick "ST1TCH" Thomas – keyboards, electronics, samples, turntables, water drums; Robbie "Roberto Diablo" Godsey – water drums, drums, additional percussion	none
Late 2021–mid 2022	Steve Rauckhorst – clean vocals; Jason "J Mann" Popson – harsh/rap vocals; Jackie "Ms. Jackie" LaPonza – clean vocals; Joe "Jenkins" Gaal – guitars; Ryan "Dr. F" Farrell – bass, keyboards; Steve "Skinny" Felton – drums, percussion, water drums, keyboards, samples; Rick "ST1TCH" Thomas – keyboards, electronics, samples, turntables, water drums; Robbie "Roberto Diablo" Godsey – water drums, drums, additional percussion	none
Mid 2022–early 2025	Steve Rauckhorst – clean/harsh vocals; Scott "Strike" Beck – harsh/rap vocals; Jackie "Ms. Jackie" LaPonza – clean vocals; Dave "Gravy" Felton – guitars; Joe "Jenkins" Gaal – guitars; Ryan "Dr. F" Farrell – bass, keyboards, guitars (studio only); Aydin "Alien" Kerr - drums, percussion; Steve "Skinny" Felton – keyboards, samples, percussion, water drums, drums (studio); Robbie "Roberto Diablo" Godsey – water drums, additional percussion; Jordan Gannon - water drums (touring)	Call the Devil (2024)
Early 2025-Mid 2026	Steve Rauckhorst – clean/harsh vocals; Scott "Strike" Beck – harsh/rap vocals; Jackie "Ms. Jackie" LaPonza – clean vocals; Dave "Gravy" Felton – guitars; Joe "Jenkins" Gaal – guitars; Ryan "Dr. F" Farrell – bass, keyboards, guitars (studio only); Aydin "Alien" Kerr - drums, percussion; Steve "Skinny" Felton – keyboards, samples, percussion, water drums, drums (studio); Simon Kanaris – water drums; Jordan Gannon - water drums (touring)	
Mid 2026-Present	Steve Rauckhorst – clean/harsh vocals; Scott "Strike" Beck – harsh/rap vocals; Jackie "Ms. Jackie" LaPonza – clean vocals; Dave "Gravy" Felton – guitars; Joe "Jenkins" Gaal – guitars; Aydin "Alien" Kerr - drums, percussion; Steve "Skinny" Felton – keyboards, samples, percussion, water drums, drums (studio); Simon Kanaris – water drums; Jordan Gannon - water drums (touring); Joel Karschner - bass	
