= Cut Me =

Cut Me may refer to:

- "Cut Me", a song by Coldrain from the 2022 album Nonnegative
- "Cut Me", a song by Moses Sumney from the 2020 album Græ
- "Cut Me", a song by Mushroomhead from the 2006 album Savior Sorrow
