= A Wonderful Life (Mushroomhead album) =

Studio album by Mushroomhead
- Released: June 19, 2020
- Recorded: 2018–2020, Filthy Hands Studio
- Genre: Nu metal; alternative metal; experimental metal
- Length: 58:03
- Label: Napalm
- Producer: Steve Felton, Matt Wallace

Mushroomhead chronology
The Righteous & the Butterfly (2014)	A Wonderful Life (2020)	Call the Devil (2024)

Singles from A Wonderful Life
- 1. "Seen It All" Released: April 21, 2020; 2. "The Heresy" Released: May 26, 2020; 3. "Carry On" Released: July 14, 2020

A Wonderful Life is the eighth studio album by American heavy metal band Mushroomhead. It was released on June 19, 2020, and is their first album to feature Steve Rauckhorst and Jackie LaPonza on vocals. It is also the first Mushroomhead album without vocalist Jeffrey Hatrix and keyboardist Tom Schmitz, the last album with sampler Rick Thomas and vocalist Jason Popson before his second departure and the only album with Tom Shaffner on guitars.

To promote A Wonderful Life, Mushroomhead released "Seen It All" as a single on April 21, 2020.

== Background and history ==
In September 2016, Mushroomhead announced that the band would return to the studio in the fall of 2016 to record their eighth studio album. In March 2018, it was announced long-time vocalist Jeffrey Nothing had departed the band, with guitarist Tommy Church announcing his departure a few days later. Later that month, it was announced that Steve Rauckhorst would be the new vocalist, and Tom Shaffner as the new guitarist respectively.

On April 4, 2019, Mushroomhead announced that they had signed with Napalm Records. Steve Felton and Jackie LaPonza revealed that during the tour they had recorded vocals at Abbey Road Studios while on a UK tour in July 2019, and that the new album was 80% finished.

On April 21, 2020, The album's first single "Seen It All" was also released. Later that day, A Wonderful Life was announced as the title of the band's new album, and would be released on June 19, 2020. It was also announced touring vocalist Jackie LaPonza had officially joined the band.

On May 26, 2020, the band released the second single, "The Heresy".

On October 31, 2020, the band released a teaser for their "Shroomhouse" Double Featurette in a Grindhouse Cinema Style, which was officially released on February 14, 2021, and includes several fake trailers for movies and merchandising, mock up versions of film companies logos in their traditional Mushroomhead style, and the music videos for Carry On and Madness Within. Also on December 15, 2021, they released the short film music video for A Requiem for Tomorrow.

== Track listing ==
All tracks are written by Mushroomhead.

No.	Title	Length
1.	"A Requiem for Tomorrow"	4:42
2.	"Madness Within"	3:38
3.	"Seen It All"	3:57
4.	"The Heresy"	4:00
5.	"What a Shame"	4:19
6.	"Pulse"	4:28
7.	"Carry On"	3:16
8.	"The Time Has Come"	4:41
9.	"11th Hour"	5:09
10.	"I Am the One"	3:52
11.	"The Flood"	4:25
12.	"Where the End Begins"	7:18
13.	"Confutatis"	4:15
Total length:		58:03

Bonus tracks

No.	Title	Length
14.	"To the Front"	2:41
15.	"Sound of Destruction"	4:27
16.	"Another Ghost"	3:42
17.	"Lacrimosa"	2:04
Total length:		71:00

== Personnel ==
=== Mushroomhead ===
- Jason Popson – harsh vocals (tracks 1–5, 7–11, 15, 16); rapped vocals (tracks 2, 7, 8, 15)
- Steve Rauckhorst – clean and harsh vocals (tracks 1–3, 5–12, 15, 16)
- Jackie LaPonza – clean vocals (tracks 2, 4, 6, 7, 12)
- Tom Shaffner – guitars (Credited but did not perform)
- Ryan Farrell – Guitars, bass guitar, keyboards, piano, orchestration
- Rick Thomas – samples, electronics
- Steve Felton – drums, keyboards, samples, vocals
- Robbie Godsey – drums, additional percussion

=== Other personnel ===
- Cleveland Chamber Choir – additional choir vocals (tracks 1, 6, 13 and 17)

=== Production staff ===
- Steve Felton – production, engineering
- Matt Wallace – mixing, additional production
- Ryan Farrell – additional engineering
- Don DeBiase – additional engineering
- Bill Korecky – additional production on Carry On
- Craig Martini – additional production on Carry On
- Howie Weinberg – mastering
- Gus Fink – cover art
