= Call the Devil =

Studio album by Mushroomhead
- Released: August 9, 2024
- Genres: Alternative metal; avant-garde metal
- Length: 60:04
- Label: Napalm
- Producer: Steve Felton

Mushroomhead chronology
A Wonderful Life (2020)	Call the Devil (2024)

Singles from Call the Devil
- 1. "Fall in Line" Released: June 13, 2024; 2. "Prepackaged" Released: July 10, 2024; 3. "We Don't Care" Released: August 7, 2024

Call the Devil is the ninth studio album by American heavy metal band Mushroomhead. It was released on August 9, 2024, by Napalm Records. It is the first album to feature guitarist Joe "Jenkins" Gaal, vocalist Scott Beck and drummer Aydin Kerr. In addition, it serves as the return of guitarist Dave "Gravy" Felton. It is also the last album to feature Robert Godsey IV on percussion and Ryan Farrell on bass. It is produced by long-time member Steve "Skinny" Felton, mixed by Matt Wallace and mastered by Jacob Hansen. The first single released was "Fall in Line" on June 13, 2024, followed by its music video. "Prepackaged" and its video followed on July 10, and "We Don't Care" was released on August 7.

== Track listing ==
All tracks are written by Ryan Farrell, Steve Rauckhorst and Steve Felton, except where noted.

No.	Title	Writer(s)	Length
1.	"Eye to Eye"	Rauckhorst, Dave Felton, S. Felton	4:40
2.	"Fall in Line"	Joe Gaal, S. Felton	4:44
3.	"Emptiness"		4:21
4.	"We Don't Care"	Farrell, Rauckhorst, D. Felton, S. Felton	3:50
5.	"UIOP (A Final Reprieve)"		3:42
6.	"Prepackaged"		5:03
7.	"Decomposition"		4:49
8.	"Grand Gesture"		5:50
9.	"Hallelucination"		4:36
10.	"Hideous"		4:19
11.	"Torn in Two"		4:08
12.	"Shame in a Basket"		8:22
13.	"Doom Goose"		1:41
Total length:			60:05

== Personnel ==
Mushroomhead

- Steve Rauckhorst – vocals (tracks 1, 3–12)
- Scott Beck – vocals (tracks 1–6, 9–11)
- Jackie LaPonza – vocals (tracks 2, 4, 7, 9, 12)
- Dave Felton – guitars
- Joe Gaal – guitars
- Ryan Farrell – bass, keyboards, piano, orchestration
- Steve Felton – keyboards, samples, programming, percussion, additional drums, vocals (tracks 9–10)
- Robert Godsey IV – percussion, additional drums
- Aydin Kerr – drums, percussion

Production

- Steve Felton – production
- Matt Wallace – mixing
- Jacob Hansen – mastering

== Charts ==
Chart performance for Call the Devil
Chart (2024)	Peak position
UK Album Downloads (Official Charts)	39
UK Independent Albums (Official Charts)	15
UK Rock & Metal Albums (Official Charts)	8
