= Savior Sorrow =

Studio album by Mushroomhead
- Released: September 19, 2006
- Recorded: Mars Studio, Ohio
- Genre: Alternative metal, industrial metal, nu metal
- Length: 49:10
- Label: Megaforce
- Producer: Mushroomhead, Steve Felton, Bill Korecky

Mushroomhead chronology
XIII (2003)	Savior Sorrow (2006)	Beautiful Stories for Ugly Children (2010)

Singles from Savior Sorrow
- 1. "Simple Survival" Released: August 15, 2006; 2. "Just Pretending" Released: March 6, 2007; 3. "12 Hundred" / "Save Us" Released: 2007

Savior Sorrow (also recognized as SaVIor Sorrow during the album's development stages) is the fifth studio album by American heavy metal band Mushroomhead. It is their first release through Megaforce Records. This is the first Mushroomhead recording to not feature original vocalist Jason "J Mann" Popson and guitarist Bronson, who left the band in 2004 and 2005 respectively. The former is replaced by Waylon Reavis.

Originally set to be released on June 6, 2006, it was pushed back for unknown reasons (but is speculated due to attempting to acquire the rights to Prince's song, "When Doves Cry" so they could place a cover on the album) and MushroomKombat was launched instead. The album was released on September 19, 2006, in the United States, while overseas versions were released in mid-October 2006.

== Album information ==
Bronson left the band in 2005, a year before the album was released, to return to film school. Although the majority of the guitar parts for the album were created by Gravy, Bronson did in fact write the majority of "Cut Me" and "The Need". Rather than recruiting another guitarist, the band decided to let Gravy tackle all the guitar parts in the album. Gravy had said, "it worked out really well, because Bronson wasn't a natural [guitar] player. Now that he's gone, I don't have to worry anymore that my riffs will be too difficult for him to play." Since then, Mushroomhead continues with only one guitarist.

The album was released on Waylon Reavis' birthday, which is also the anniversary of the day he was asked to join the band.

A demo version of the song "Burn" was included on a FYE sampler, which was given away in June exclusively with the purchase of two qualifying CDs at FYE stores. It was limited to 25,000 copies and was done in conjunction with Decibel magazine.

Drummer Steve Felton (Skinny) said: "It's a new chapter in MUSHROOMHEAD's evolution. There are sounds on this album that sound so brutal and huge. We focused on delivering some vicious hardcore mixed with heavy melodic hooks. Lyrically, it definitely reflects where the world is at this moment in time."

The album's first single, "Simple Survival" debuted on Cleveland's WMMS on August 11, 2006. The band began a world tour on September 12, 2006, alongside SOiL, Brand New Sin, and The Autumn Offering as part of the Jägermeister Music Tour. It was featured in the 2007 film Return to House on Haunted Hill.

Videos for "Simple Survival", "Burn", "Damage Done", "12 Hundred", "Save Us" and "Embrace the Ending" have been filmed. "Damage Done" was filmed by Robert Kurtzman's crew after the filming of scenes in the upcoming horror movie The Rage, which features a Mushroomhead performance.

Drummer and producer Skinny commented on the addition of Waylon as second vocalist: “Waylon is versatile. He is a chameleon who changes his voice at breakneck speed. It’s truly remarkable.”

=== Music videos ===
Drummer Skinny explained about the "12 Hundred" video: "It's very, very horror movie-esque — really gory and bloody and pretty evil." It was filmed by video director, maskmaker and make-up artist Dave Henson Greathouse on the set of the film The Rage. The video won "2007 Video of the Year."

The music video of "Simple Survival" was directed by Chad Kalek and features Tom Shaffner, who became their current guitarist in 2018.

John Carpet directed the music video of "Burn". Carpet is also known to have directed some of Tim Burton's films, even though he is not included in the credits. There was a lesser known music video for "Damage Done" released that featured the band playing in front of a crowd and surrounded by fire performers in the woods.

Other music videos were made for Damage Done, Save Us, Erase the Doubt and Embrace the Ending.

== Etymology ==
Jeffrey Nothing has stated in an interview with Mortley Seaver on antiMUSIC.com that Savior Sorrow is saying "'Save Your Sorrow.' Or with everything that's happened to us in the past, we're probably stronger than ever, so it's pretty much saying 'Fuck your pity' in a way."

Other name considerations were "Savior Self" and "The Six Seas of Sorrow".

== Release and reception ==
Professional ratings
Review scores
Source	Rating
AllMusic	3.5/5 stars
About.com	3.5/5 stars

The album was released with seven different album slip covers featuring one member each.

The September 19 release featured two bonus tracks exclusive to Best Buy copies of the album. The first bonus was an alternate version of "The Fallen" and the second bonus was additional music from "Embrace the Ending." The 7 different album covers were also exclusive to Best Buy, but in "Limited Edition." While the Circuit City CD sale came with a Savior Sorrow ringtone.

500,000 copies of the album have a special "3-D" cover, available everywhere.

Savior Sorrow debuted at No. 73 on the Billboard 200 charts with sales exceeding 12,000. However, the band's label stated that sales were closer to 25,000 with the inclusion of sales made while on tour. SoundScan issued an apology the day following the release of sales data due to mistakes made in estimates. The primary reason given was the lack of inclusion of sales from the Best Buy retailer chain. Sales of Savior Sorrow were indeed around 26,000 and the chart entry place was closer to the No. 30 spot than No. 73. However, Savior Sorrow's chart position was later officially adjusted to No. 50. Simple Survival, the pre-released single to Savior Sorrow, was placed at No. 40 on the Hot Mainstream Rock Tracks chart one week after the release.

"Savior Sorrow" has been released on double vinyl.

As of September 2007, Savior Sorrow had sold over 76,000 copies in the US.

As of May, 2009, Savior Sorrow has sold close to 125,000 copies worldwide.

== Track listing ==
All tracks are written by Mushroomhead, except where noted.

No.	Title	Writer(s)	Length
1.	"12 Hundred"		3:21
2.	"Simple Survival"		3:15
3.	"Damage Done"		3:40
4.	"Save Us"		3:46
5.	"Tattoo" (featuring Sean Kane of Gizmachi)		4:07
6.	"Erase the Doubt"		4:16
7.	"Burn"		2:53
8.	"Just Pretending"		4:12
9.	"The Need"	Mushroomhead, Marko Vukcevich	4:56
10.	"Cut Me"	Mushroomhead, Vukcevich	5:24
11.	"The Fallen"		4:22
12.	"Embrace the Ending"		4:53

FYE bonus track
No.	Title	Length
13.	"Burn" (Original Recording)	3:03

Bust Buy bonus tracks
No.	Title	Length
13.	"Whole World Calling" ("Embrace the Ending" demo version)	2:07
14.	"The Fallen" (Demo Version)	4:26

== Album credits ==
=== Mushroomhead ===
- Jeffrey Nothing – vocals
- Waylon – vocals
- Gravy – guitars
- Pig Benis – bass
- Shmotz – keyboards, samples
- ST1TCH – samples, electronics
- Skinny – drums, percussion

=== Other personnel ===
- Skinny – artwork, production
- Jeffrey Nothing – lyrics
- Waylon – lyrics
- ST1TCH – artwork
- Marko Vukcevich – guitars
- Bill Korecky – mixing
- Brian Serra – artwork
- Harold Mapes – digital editing
- James Serra – artwork
- Mushroomhead – engineer, mixing, producer
- Pat Lewis – engineer
- Roger Lian – mastering
- Sean Kane – guest vocals on "Tattoo"

== Charting positions ==
=== Album ===
Year	Chart	Position
2006	The Billboard 200	50
2006	Top Independent Albums	2
2006	Top Rock Albums	17

=== Singles ===
Year	Single	Chart	Position
2006	"Simple Survival"	Mainstream Rock Tracks	39
