= Beautiful Stories for Ugly Children (album) =

Studio album by Mushroomhead
- Released: September 28, 2010
- Recorded: 2009–2010, Filthy Hands Studio
- Genres: Alternative metal, industrial metal, nu metal
- Length: 49:32
- Label: Megaforce
- Producer: Steve Felton

Mushroomhead chronology
Savior Sorrow (2006)	Beautiful Stories for Ugly Children (2010)	The Righteous & the Butterfly (2014)

Singles from Beautiful Stories for Ugly Children
- 1. "Come On" Released: August 16, 2010; 2. "I'll Be Here" Released: 2010

Beautiful Stories for Ugly Children is the sixth studio album by American heavy metal band Mushroomhead. The album was released on September 28, 2010 by Megaforce Records. The first single from the album "Come On", was released on August 16, 2010. It is the band's final album to feature Pig Benis on bass and Gravy on guitar, and it is the only album to feature Lil Dan on percussion.

== Album information ==
On August 31, 2010, "Come On" was released uncensored on iTunes. The video of their first single "Come On" was premiered on Headbangers Ball on September 27, hosted by Mushroomhead themselves. "Come On" was also featured in the Criminal Minds episode "There's no Place like Home" from the show's 7th season. "Come On" was also featured on October 5, 2010 episode of Total Nonstop Action Wrestling (TNA) on Spike TV as a promotion of the long storied rivalry between Wrestling Legend, Ric Flair and Hardcore Wrestling Legend, Mick Foley.

The album title is inspired by the 'Beautiful Stories for Ugly Children comic book series published by DC Comics through their Piranha Press imprint from June 1989 until September 1992. According to the band, they wanted the album title to reflect the nature of the songs themselves, and the title came once they incorporated the visual elements of the project. According to Jeffrey Nothing, the working title for the album was going to be Slaughterhouse Road, before it was changed to its current title, however, Slaughterhouse Road was still used as a song title.

== Reception ==
Professional ratings
Review scores
Source	Rating
AllMusic	2/5 stars
About.com	4/5 stars
The Marshalltown Chronicle	2.5/5 stars
Metal Underground	3.5/5 stars

After its first week of sales, the album debuted at No. 9 on the Billboard Indie chart, and No. 44 overall selling over 11,000 copies the first week.

== Track listing ==
No.	Title	Length
1.	"Come On"	4:07
2.	"Inspiration"	3:46
3.	"Slaughterhouse Road"	3:41
4.	"I'll Be Here"	4:36
5.	"Burn the Bridge"	5:10
6.	"Holes in the Void" (feat. Joe Altier and Sarah Sloan)	4:45
7.	"Harvest the Garden"	4:34
8.	"The Harm You Do"	4:06
9.	"Your Demise"	4:21
10.	"The Feel"	3:50
11.	"Darker Days"	3:46
12.	"Do I Know You?"	2:46
Total length:		49:32

== Personnel ==
- Jeffrey Hatrix - vocals, lyrics
- Waylon Reavis - vocals, lyrics
- Dave Felton - all guitars
- Jack Kilcoyne - bass guitar
- Tom Schmitz - keyboards, samples
- Steve Felton - drums, percussion, producer
- Rick Thomas - samples, electronics, turntables
- Daniel Fox - drums, additional percussion

Session musicians

- Joe Altier - guest vocals ("Holes in the Void")
- Sarah Sloan - harmony, guest vocals ("Holes in the Void")
- John Sustar - additional percussion ("Harvest the Garden")
- James Felton - kid voice
- Steven Felton (jr.) - kid voice
- Waylon Reavis (jr.) - kid voice
- Pandora Reavis - kid voice
- Mea Hatrix - kid voice
