= XIII (Mushroomhead album) =

Studio album by Mushroomhead
- Released: October 14, 2003
- Recorded: 2002–2003
- Studios: Mars Studio, Shalersville, Ohio
- Genres: Alternative metal; nu metal
- Length: 58:00
- Label: Universal
- Producers: Mushroomhead; Steve Felton; Johnny K; Matt Wallace

Mushroomhead chronology
M3 (1999)	XIII (2003)	Savior Sorrow (2006)

Singles from XIII
- 1. "Sun Doesn't Rise" Released: August 12, 2003; 2. "Eternal" Released: 2004; 3. "Kill Tomorrow" Released: 2004; 4. "Crazy" Released: 2004

Professional ratings
Review scores
Source	Rating
AllMusic	4/5 stars
Melodic	3/5 stars

XIII is the fourth studio album by American heavy metal band Mushroomhead, released on October 14, 2003. The album reached No. 40 on the Billboard 200. By 2006, it had sold 177,000 copies in the United States and 400,000 copies worldwide, making it the band's most successful album to date. It is the second Mushroomhead album to be distributed through a major label, and it was also the debut release for guitarists Bronson (who previously appeared on the band's prior album M3 as turntablist/sampler) and Gravy, as well as turntablist/sampler Stitch.

XIII includes the single "Sun Doesn't Rise". Its music video was directed by Vincent Marcone. The video aired frequently on Headbangers Ball upon release. The track "Sun Doesn't Rise" was also featured on the Freddy vs. Jason soundtrack.

In 2019, Joe Smith-Engelhardt of Alternative Press included the song "Sun Doesn't Rise" in his list of "Top 10 nü-metal staples that still hold up today". In 2021, the staff of Revolver included the album in their list of the "20 Essential Nu-Metal Albums". In 2022, Eli Enis of Revolver included the song "The Dream Is Over" in his list of the "10 Heaviest Nu-Metal Songs of All Time".

== Reception ==
The album received positive reviews, with critics stating that it was an improved version of XX. It could be seen as the first major release of Mushroomhead to review, as XX was only a compilation album featuring songs from their previous three self-released albums. Some critics complimented on Mushroomhead's extensive use of piano solos and various other instruments.

In 2018, the album was ranked at No. 20 on Revolver's list of "20 Essential Nu-Metal Albums".

== Track listing ==
All songs written by Mushroomhead, except for "Crazy" written by Seal and Guy Sigsworth.

No.	Title	Length
1.	"Kill Tomorrow"	3:45
2.	"Sun Doesn't Rise"	3:12
3.	"Mother Machine Gun"	4:16
4.	"Nowhere to Go"	3:42
5.	"Becoming Cold (216)"	4:25
6.	"One More Day" (featuring Devon Gorman)	3:36
7.	"The Dream Is Over" (featuring Jens Kidman of Meshuggah)	3:15
8.	"The War Inside"	2:58
9.	"Almost Gone"	4:01
10.	"Eternal"	3:12
11.	"Our Own Way"	3:40
12.	"Destroy the World Around Me"	8:21
13.	"Thirteen" (hidden track "Crazy" starts at 5:23)	9:31

UK bonus tracks
No.	Title	Length
14.	"Treason"	2:34
15.	"Loop #6"	3:34

Enhanced CD online content
No.	Title	Length
16.	"Along the Way"	3:17
17.	"The Simpleton"	2:10
18.	"The Eternal" (music video)	3:13
19.	"Along the Way" (music video)	3:19

== Bonus tracks ==
British copies of the album include the song "Treason" and the instrumental "Loop #6". Enhanced copies were said to have "Along the Way" and "Simpleton" as bonus tracks available for download through a CD identification process from a secret page on Universalmotown.com. Since Mushroomhead left Universal, the page has been removed.

== Personnel ==
Mushroomhead

- Jeffrey Nothing – clean vocals
- J Mann – unclean vocals, rapped vocals
- Marko "Bronson" Vukcevich – guitars
- Gravy – guitars
- Jack "Pig Benis" Kilcoyne – bass
- Tom "Shmotz" Schmitz – keyboards, samples
- Rick "St1tch" Thomas – electronics, programming, samples, turntables
- Skinny – drums, percussion

Additional personnel

- Devon Gorman – additional vocals on "One More Day"
- Jens Kidman – additional vocals on "The Dream Is Over"
- Vanessa Solowiow – photography, layout
- Matt Wallace – mixing, additional production on "Crazy"
- Johnny K – additional production on "Sun Doesn't Rise" and "Nowhere to Go"
- Brian Gardner – mastering
- Mike Roberts – Pro Tools engineering
- Steve Felton – production, additional Pro Tools engineering

== Chart positions ==
Year	Chart	Position
2003	Billboard 200	#40
