= Mushroomhead =

American heavy metal band

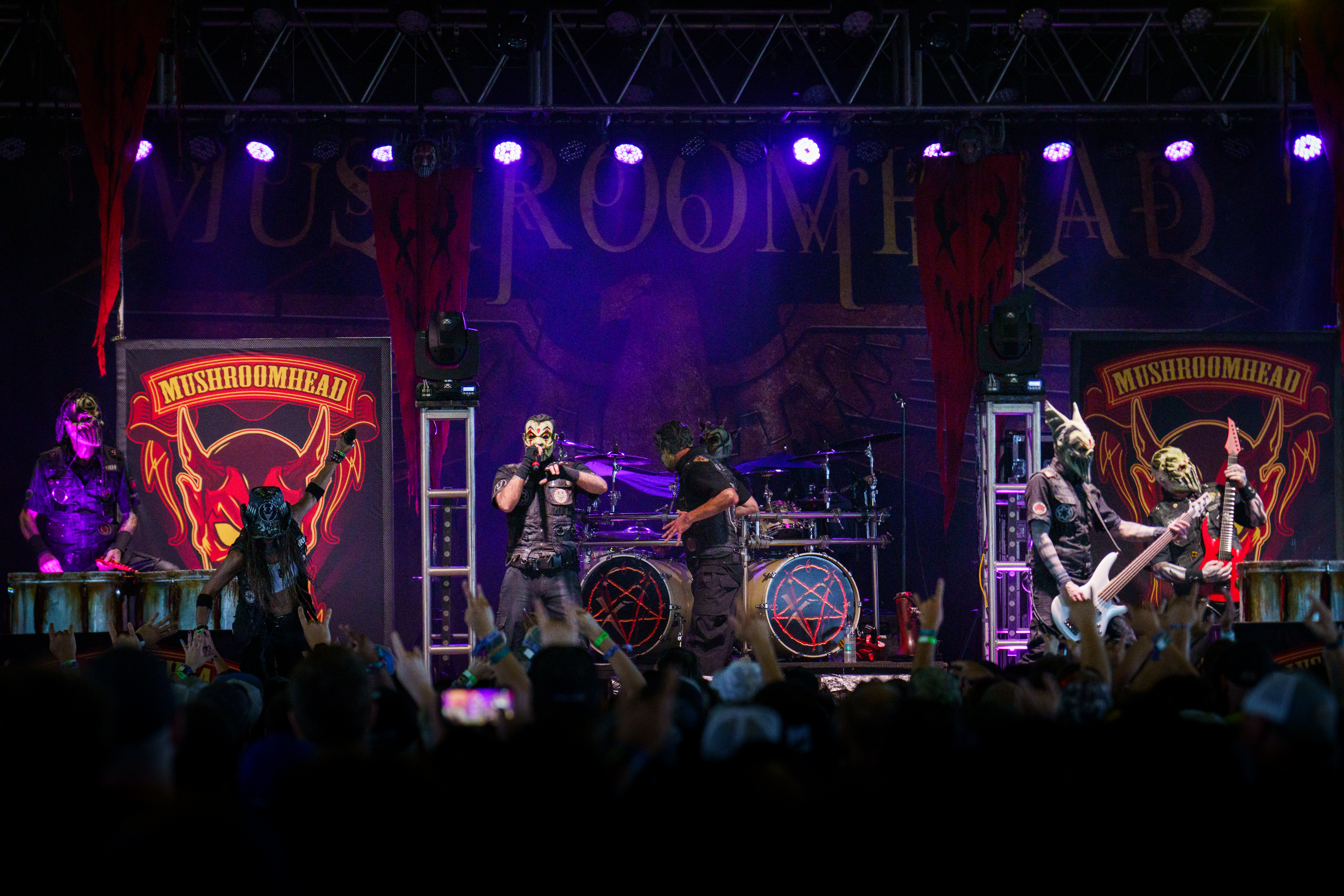
- Performing in 2023. From left to right: Skinny, Jackie LaPonza, Xtriker, Steve Rauckhorst (facing away), Roberto Diablo (obscured), Dr. F & Jenkins.

Background information
- Origin: Cleveland, Ohio, U.S.
- Genres: Alternative metal; industrial metal; nu metal; experimental metal
- Works: Mushroomhead discography
- Years active: 1993–present
- Labels: Eclipse; Universal; Megaforce; Filthy Hands; Napalm
- Members: Steve Felton; Jackie LaPonza; Steve Rauckhorst; Joe Gaal; Dave Felton; Scott Beck; Aydin Kerr; Simon Kanaris; Jordan Gannon; Joel Karschner
- Past members: Tommy Church; Jeffrey Hatrix; John Sekula; Richie Moore; Marko Vukcevich; Joe Kilcoyne; Jack Kilcoyne; Joe Lenkey; Daniel Fox; Waylon Reavis; Tom Schmitz; Tommy Shaffner; Jason Popson; Rick Thomas; Robbie Godsey; Ryan Farrell
- Website: mushroomhead.com

Mushroomhead is an American heavy metal band from Cleveland, Ohio. Formed in 1993 in the Cleveland Warehouse District, the band is known for their avant-garde sound and horror film-inspired imagery which features masks and costumes as well as their unique live shows usually performed at smaller venues.

Since the band's formation, Mushroomhead has experienced numerous lineup changes, with water drummer, keyboardist, DJ and visual designer Steve "Skinny" Felton being the sole consistent member. Other members include vocalists Steve Rauckhorst, Jackie LaPonza and Scott "Strike" Beck, guitarists Dave "Gravy" Felton and Joe "Jenkins" Gaal, bassist Joel Karschner, drummer Aydin Kerr, and water drummers Jordan Gannon and Simon Kanaris. Previous vocalists include Jeffrey Nothing, Jason "J Mann" Popson and Waylon Reavis.

== History ==
=== Debut album, Superbuick and M3 (1993–2000) ===
In 1993, Mushroomhead was established as a side project. To differentiate itself from the members' existing bands and to dispel any misconceptions about the group's sound and musical content, Mushroomhead used costumes, masks, and pseudonyms. Mushroomhead played its first show in 1993. Days later, the octet found itself on stage alongside established metal band Gwar. "We played our first show on a Saturday" said the band's drummer, Skinny, in an article for Mushroomhead's official website. "Three days later, we got a call to play with Gwar at the Cleveland Agora in front of 2,000 people – our second show ever!".

In 1995, Mushroomhead released a self-financed debut album, Mushroomhead, with their own record label, Filthy Hands Co. (previously known as Shroomco Records and later on, MRH Records). For the members, Mushroomhead became a priority with their original bands breaking-up. Although the line-up saw many changes throughout the 1990s, the band stayed active, steadily releasing music and gaining followers. In 1996, they released Superbuick. In 1999, Mushroomhead released M3, which was the final album self-financed and self-released by the band.

=== XX and XIII (2000–2005) ===
In 2000, Mushroomhead acquired a record deal with independent label Eclipse Records and in 2001 the band released their first ever label-released album; a re-recorded compilation release titled XX, which contains remixed/remastered versions of select songs from the first three Mushroomhead albums. Later in the year, after quickly selling almost 40,000 copies in just 2–3 months, the band signed with major label Universal Records and the compilation was re-released internationally. The release of the album led Mushroomhead to major national and international tours including Ozzfest 2002; as well as television exposure via their first music video "Solitaire/Unraveling". Also in 2001, guitarist J.J. Righteous was replaced by one of the band's previous stage dancers & then current sampler, Marko Vukcevich. 2003 saw the release of XIII, their first album with new material for Universal Records. The album produced the single "Sun Doesn't Rise" which was featured on MTV: Headbangers Ball and the Freddy vs Jason soundtrack. Also featuring the hidden track "Crazy", a song originally by Seal. The album debuted at no. 40 on the Billboard Top 200 charts and sold 400,000 copies worldwide.

After an extensive world tour, vocalist J Mann announced he was leaving the band in August 2004, citing exhaustion and to take care of his sick father. He was replaced by Three Quarters Dead singer, Waylon. In August 2005, Mushroomhead self-released its first DVD on its own Filthy Hands label – "Volume 1". Produced, directed, shot, and edited by the band, Volume 1 covers the band's rise in the 2000s with live performances, music videos, and behind the scenes footage.

While on the road in 2005, Mushroomhead began the process of writing new material and recording a new album. In December 2005, Mushroomhead signed with Megaforce Records, ensuring the new album's availability nationally and internationally. On June 6, 2006, Mushroomhead launched Mushroom Kombat – an interactive flash feature as a part of the band's official website. The mini-game pits band members against each other in a Mortal Kombat-style environment, with each member having a unique fatality.

In 2005, Bronson announced that he was leaving the band to further his studies. Rather than recruiting another guitarist, the band decided to let Gravy do all the guitar parts for their new album. Gravy had said, "it worked out really well, because Bronson wasn't a natural [guitar] player. Now that he's gone, I don't have to worry anymore that my riffs will be too difficult for him to play." Since then, Mushroomhead continued with only one guitarist until Gravy's return in 2022.

Mushroomhead headlined with Dope, Nocturne, and New Orleans locals Invain on the Music For Freedom Tour sponsored by Jägermeister at the House of Blues in New Orleans, Louisiana on Tuesday, August 16, 2005. This show was one of the last big acts to play in New Orleans for a long time due to Hurricane Katrina striking New Orleans on August 29, 2005.

=== Savior Sorrow and Beautiful Stories for Ugly Children (2005–2012) ===
Savior Sorrow was released on September 19, 2006, and debuted at No. 45 on the Billboard 200 charts with sales exceeding 12,000. The band's label stated that sales were closer to 25,000 with the inclusion of sales made while on tour. As a result, SoundScan issued an apology the day following the release of sales data due to mistakes made in estimates. The primary reason given was the lack of inclusion of sales from the Best Buy retailer chain. Sales of Savior Sorrow were roughly 26,000 and the chart entry place was closer to the No. 30 spot than No. 73. Savior Sorrow's chart position was later officially adjusted to No. 50. "Simple Survival", the pre-released single to Savior Sorrow, was placed at No. 39 on the Billboard Mainstream Rock Tracks chart one week after the release. Also in 2006, Daniel Fox (Lil' Dan) joined the band as a touring drummer.

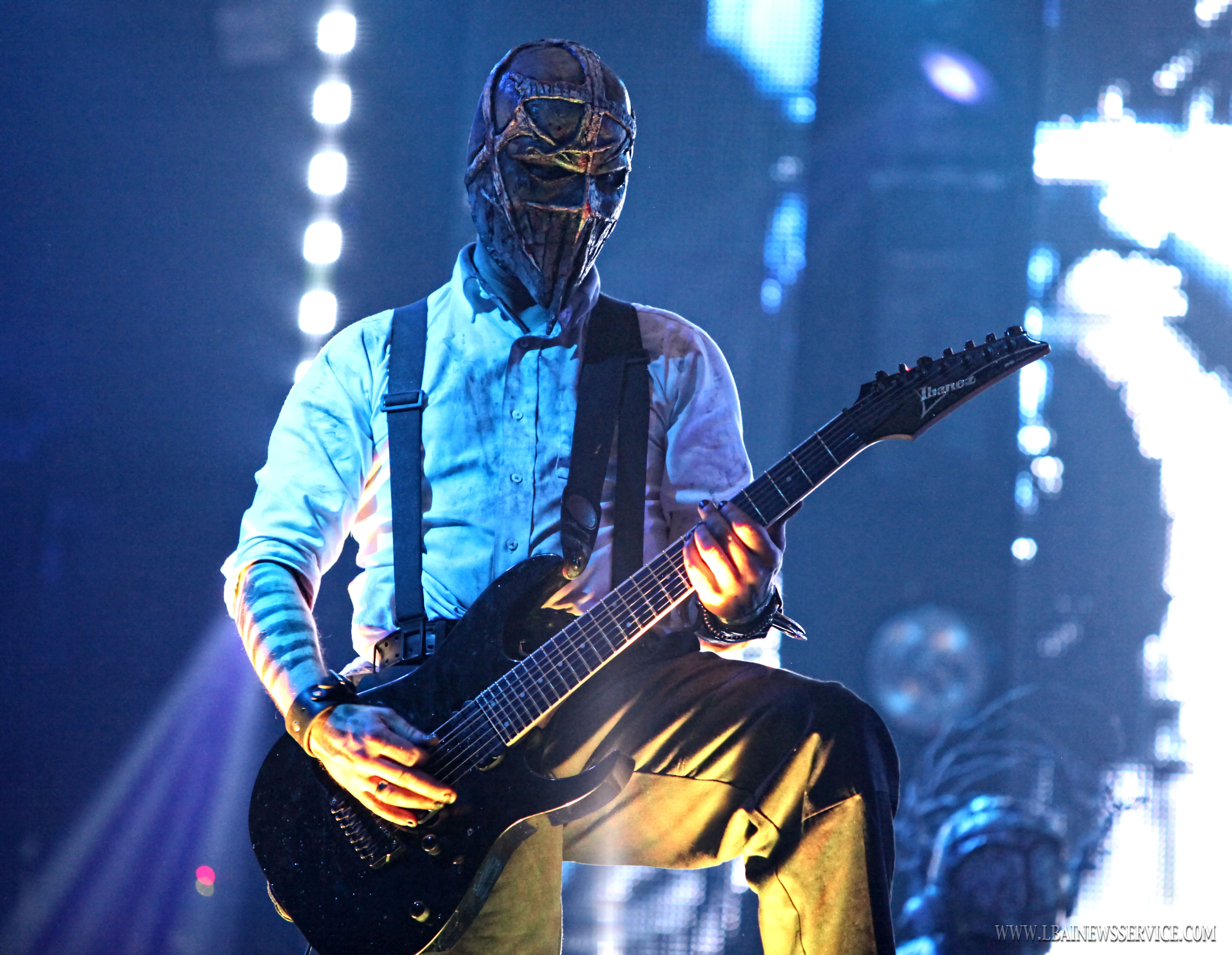
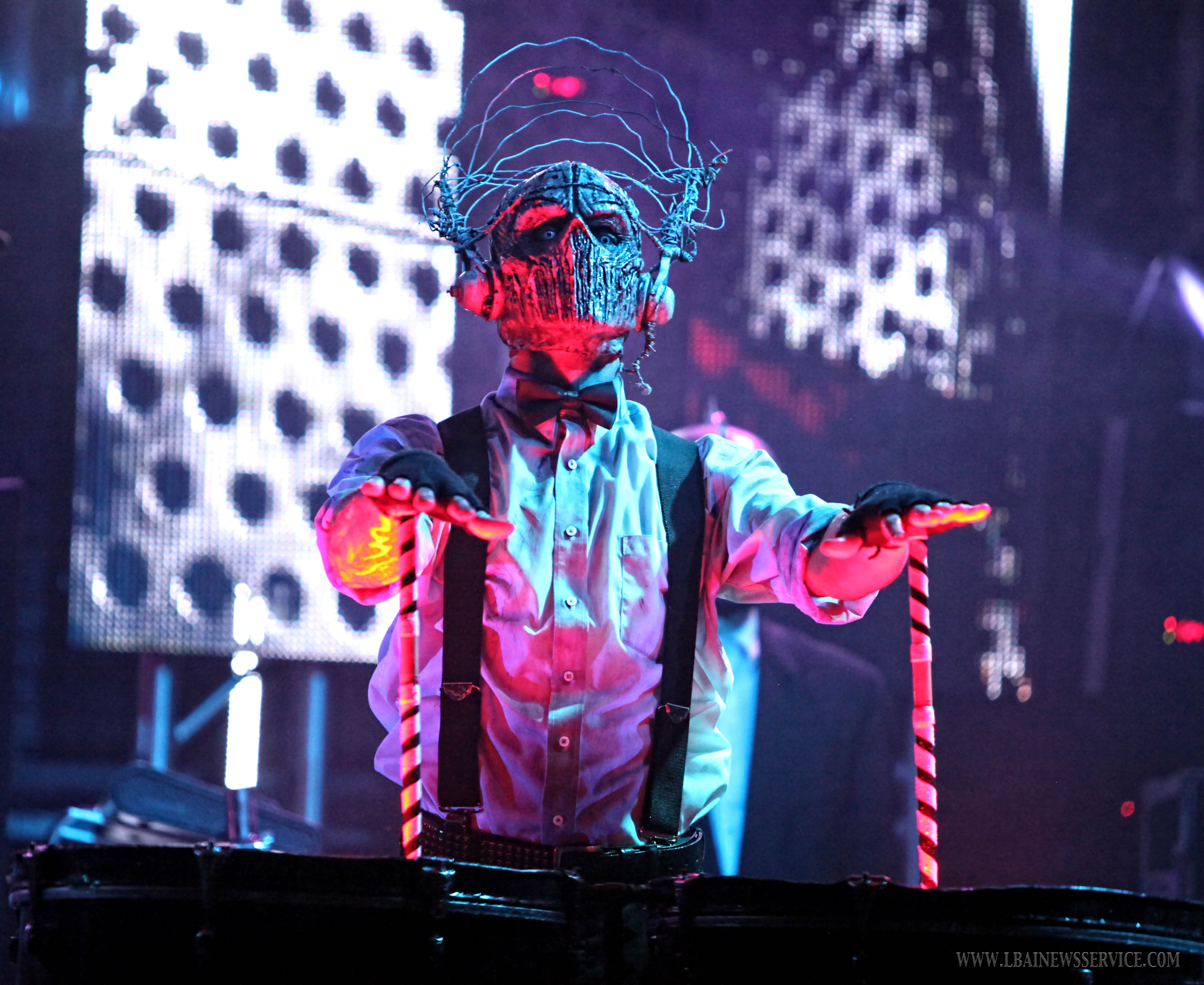
Guitarist Tommy Church (left) and turntablist St1tch (right) performing in Florida

The band has performed three shows on the Mayhem Festival tour, filling in for Bullet for My Valentine. Live footage was compiled into the band's second DVD, titled "Volume 2". On December 29, 2007, Mushroomhead won Video of the Year 2007 on the MTV2 Headbanger's Ball for "12 Hundred" from the Savior Sorrow record. On September 17, 2008, it was announced that the band will release the "Volume 2" DVD on October 28 through Filthy Hands/Megaforce Records. The disc features two and a half hours of content, including live footage from the three-year Savior Sorrow tour, music videos including "12 Hundred", "Simple Survival", "Burn", the short video for "Tattoo", "Save Us" and "Embrace the Ending", video commentary and behind the scenes footage. To support the DVD, Mushroomhead hit the road with The Autumn Offering, XFactor1, and Human Factors Lab from October 3 in Findlay, Ohio, until November 2 in Pittsburgh, Pennsylvania. After the tour, Mushroomhead returned to the studio to record their next album.

They released Beautiful Stories for Ugly Children in September 2010. Within the first week of its release, it became the No. 1 best selling metal album on iTunes. A new song, "Your Soul Is Mine," appeared on the Saw VI Soundtrack. On October 1, 2010, a music video for "Come On" debuted on Headbangers Ball on MTV. The video has since been barred from airing on MTV and other television outlets after being deemed too graphic by network censors. On October 28, 2010, the band's founding guitarist, JJ Righteous, died of unknown reasons at the age of 41.

In October 2010, following the death of ex bandmate JJ Righteous, J Mann appeared on stage with the band during their Halloween show, performing vocals for two songs alongside both Jeffrey Nothing and Waylon. Both he and Waylon made a point of announcing that there were no hard feelings between the two of them, and that they are in fact on good terms with each other. On October 5, 2010, the Professional Wrestling Promotion known as TNA (Total Nonstop Action Wrestling) (Now called "Impact Wrestling") used their hit single "Come On" as the theme song to promote a match between Ric Flair and Mick Foley, a confrontation that was 20 years in the making. The promotional video can be seen on the TNA Wrestling official YouTube Channel. It is said that a longtime fan of the band put that together for them.

In February 2012, it was announced that guitarist Gravy and bassist Pig Benis would be replaced by Tommy Church and Ryan Farrell respectively. In April 2012, Dave "Gravy" Felton stated publicly on his Facebook fan page that he was "kicked out of the band." In May 2012, Daniel "Lil Dan" Fox left Mushroomhead to work for another band. It was rumored that he is working as a drum technician for Marilyn Manson. On May 22, Dave Felton posted on his fan page an interview about his latest band. In the interview, he was asked about the Mushroomhead split. He said that he was kicked out via email and that it was the third time he had been told to leave. He said that he thought one of the reasons was because he did not have a party mentality (drinking and smoking) and that he thought it sometimes got in the way of band progress. The interview was on Uncensored Net Noise on the Msc Radio Network LLC. Drum tech Jeremiah Stratton (also known from Hed PE) had taken over Fox's percussion parts in the Hed 2 Head Tour 3. After the Hed 2 Head Tour ended, drum tech Elliot Mapes took over Fox's drum parts for live shows. People have jokingly called him "Tall E" in reference to Fox's nickname being "Lil Dan". On Thursday, August 16, 2012, Mushroomhead stated on their official Facebook fan page that former member Bronson would return on guitar for their 2012 "Old School Show".

=== The Righteous & the Butterfly (2012–2019) ===
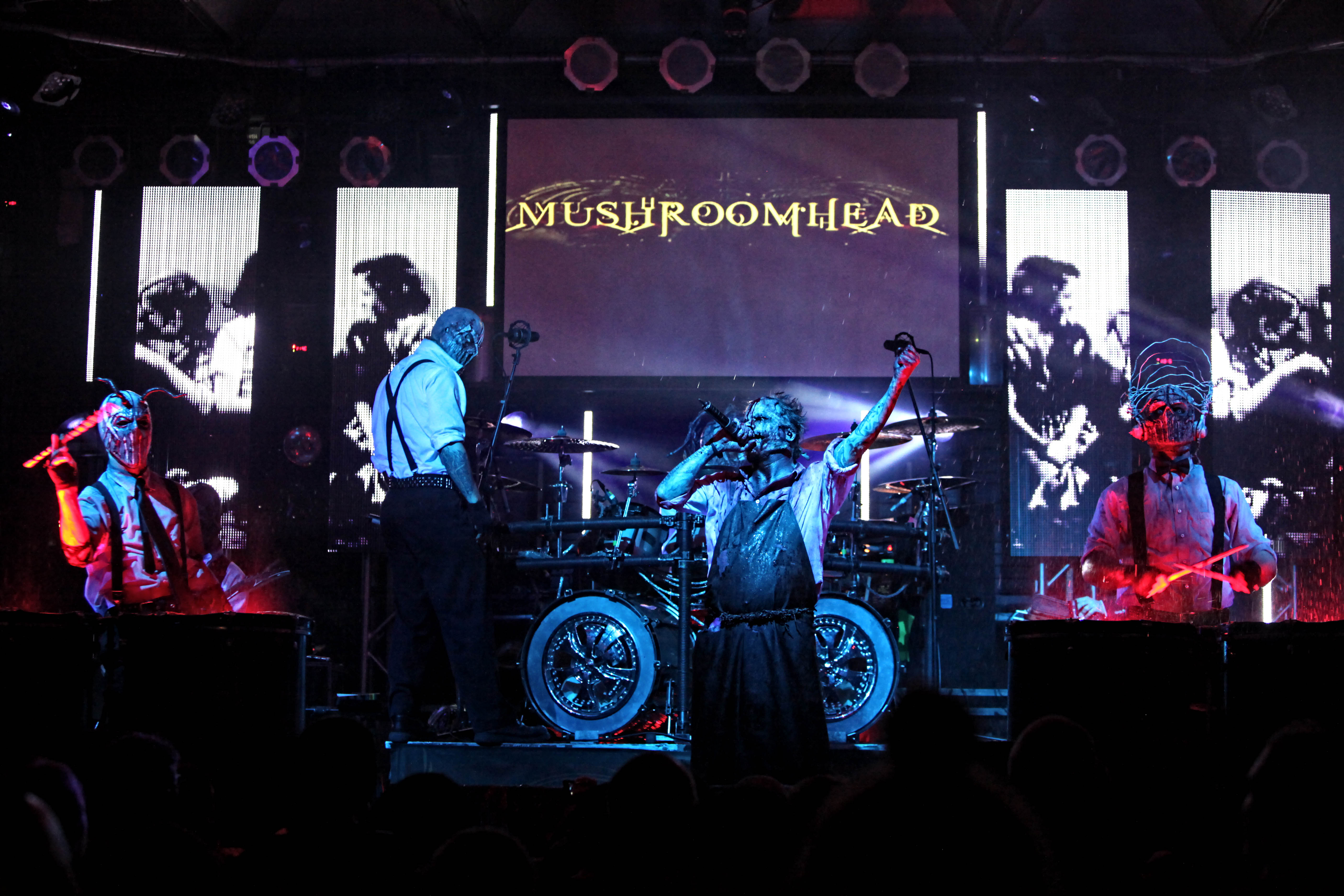
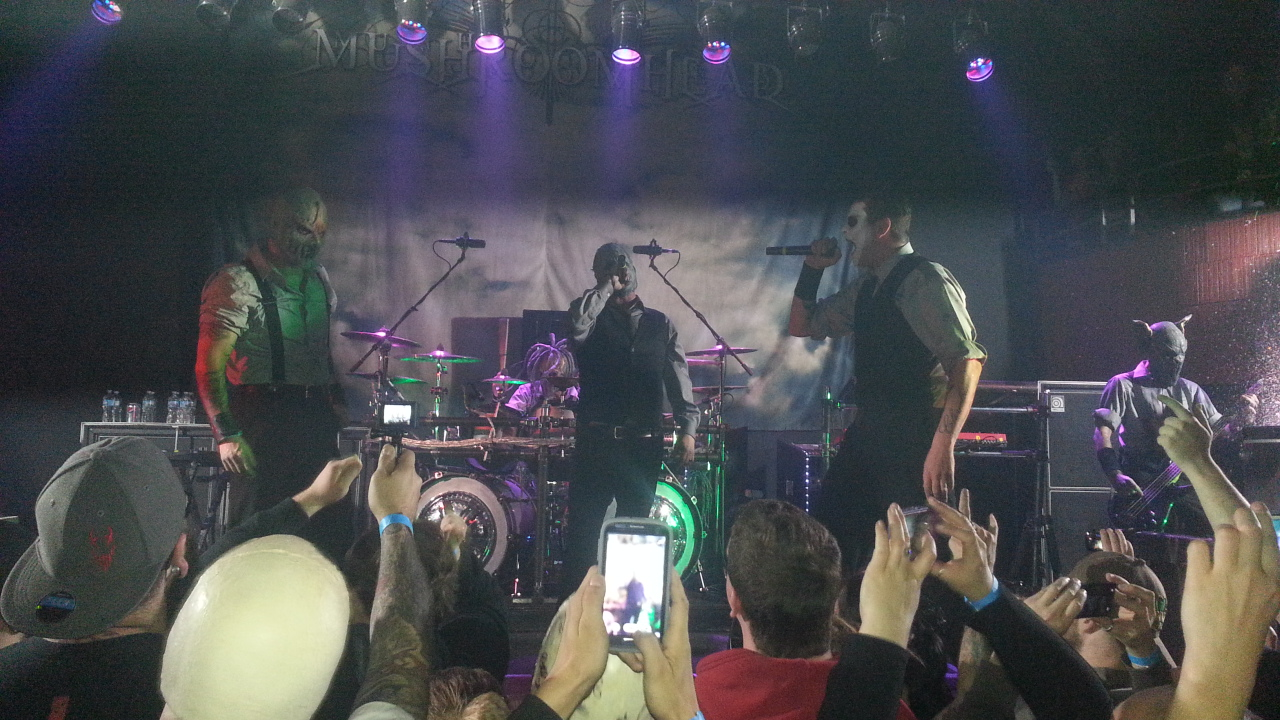
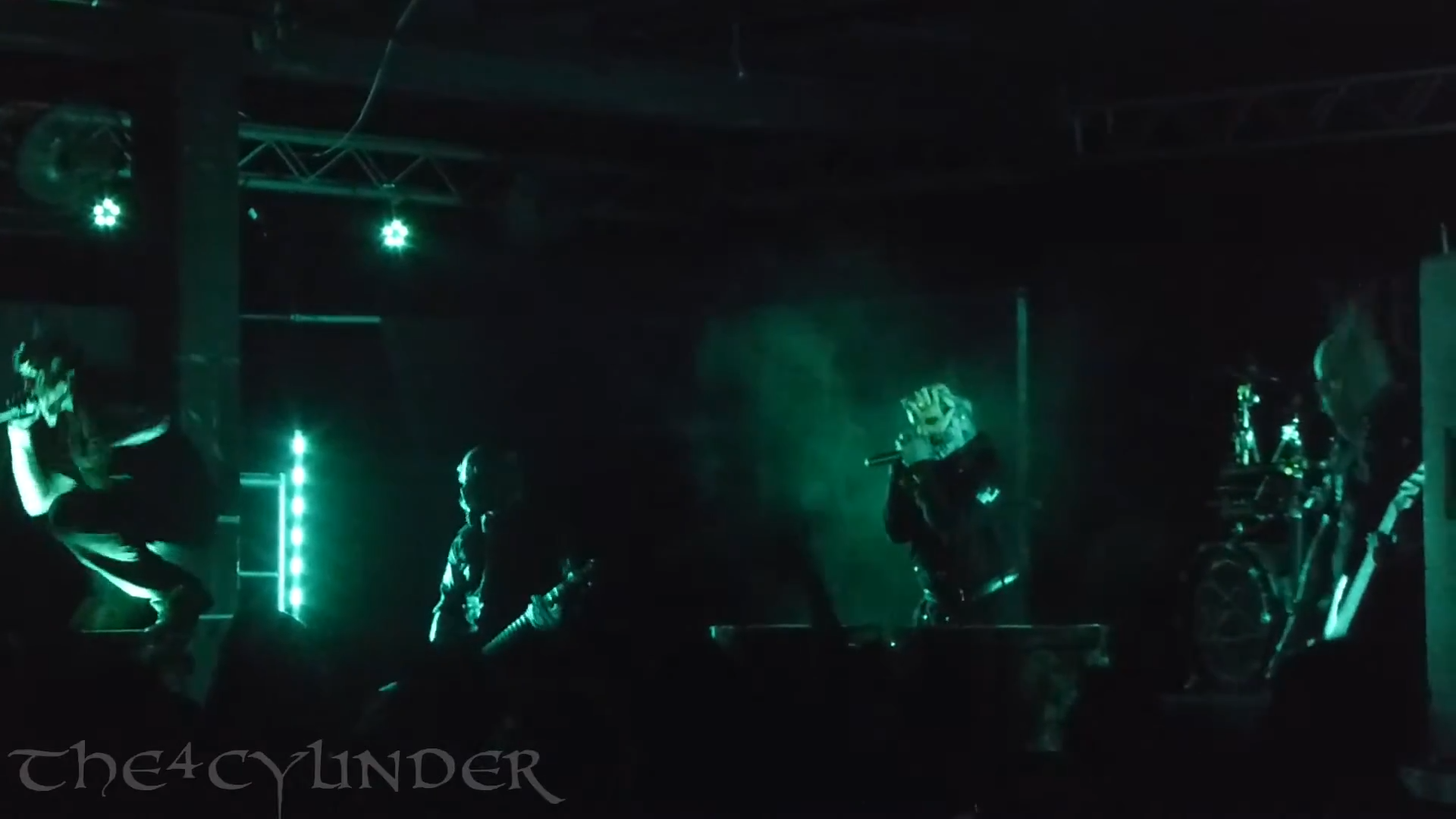
Three Mushroomhead performances in 2013, 2014 and 2016.

In September 2012, Mushroomhead announced that they are currently in the studio working on new music via their Facebook fan page. It was said by Mushroomhead frontman Jeff Hatrix that former Slipknot and current Painface vocalist Anders Colsefni is in the works to do a recording together in their upcoming studio sessions. The band entered their own Filthy Hands Studio in December 2012 to begin writing and recording their next studio album.

Their eighth album was the only one to showcase all three vocalists. Drummer Steve Felton described it as "very energetic, dark and by far their heaviest album to date, just a fresh spin on the same old thing if you will. This is the first record with Church on guitar and Farrell on bass, so having those new writers on board you never know where it's going to go. For the old school fans there's a lot of flavorful elements in it so they will definitely enjoy it."

In 2013, the band was featured in an NME article titled "28 Nu-Metal Era Bands You Probably Forgot All About".

On August 16, Jason Popson confirmed his return to the band via Facebook. Mushroomhead toured Australia for the first time as part of the Soundwave Festival 2014. On February 14, 2014, Mushroomhead released the date and name of their new album which will be released May 13, 2014 and the name of the new album is The Righteous & the Butterfly. This album marks the return of J Mann. On April 15, 2014, Frontman Jeffrey Nothing released the band's first unofficial single "Qwerty" on YouTube from his personal Facebook account. This marks the first song featuring J Mann since rejoining the band. The album received mostly positive reviews and is Mushroomhead's first album to reach the top 20 of the Billboard Top 200 chart in the United States, reaching No. 20, selling around 11,000 copies the first week. The album also, reached No. 1 in the Billboard Indie chart, their first album to do so. The Righteous & the Butterfly reached No. 5 in the Top Rock Albums and No. 1 in the Top Hard Rock Albums. Mushroomhead have released an official music video for the album's second single "Out of My Mind". The band will be co-headlining the 2014 Shockfest Tour with Insane Clown Posse.

As of October 5, 2015, vocalist Waylon Reavis announced via his Facebook page that he had parted ways with Mushroomhead, citing "irreconcilable differences with band ownership" and stating he had "severed all ties with Mushroomhead and Filthy Hands Company."

Mushroomhead went on a headlining UK tour in 2016, the first since 2002. American Head Charge was supposed to be their main support, but they ultimately decided to drop off the tour. A full European tour followed the next year.

On March 7, 2018, it was announced that vocalist and founding member Jeffrey "Nothing" Hatrix had parted ways with the band. Two days later, guitarist Tommy Church announced that he had also quit the band. On March 17, Popson's Pitch Black Forecast bandmates and the band's roadies Steve Rauckhorst and Tommy "Tankx" Shaffner were revealed as the new vocalist and guitarist respectively. Rauckhorst was a longtime friend, former neighbor and influence of the former vocalist.

On April 4, 2019, Mushroomhead announced that they had signed with Napalm Records.

In an interview during their UK tour in July 2019, drummer Felton and his wife, vocalist Jackie LaPonza revealed more information about the then forthcoming album, mentioning that during the tour they had recorded vocals at Abbey Road Studios and that the new album was 80% finished, with a tentative release date of April 2020. They confirmed that the new album cycle would also include new masks.

=== A Wonderful Life and Call the Devil (2020–present) ===
On April 21, 2020, it was announced the band's new album was titled A Wonderful Life and would be released on June 19. It was also revealed that touring vocalist Jackie LaPonza (who has toured with the band since 2014) had officially joined the band on a full-time basis, adopting the alias, Ms. Jackie. The second single, "The Heresy" was released on May 26, 2020. The album was released on June 19 on schedule. Unfortunately, her tenure with the band was cut short as both she and Shaffner quietly left a year later. Joe "Jenkins" Gaal stepped in to replace the latter.

On Nov 1, the band teased two further music videos. A trailer stated that this collaboration with SK1 productions would have 2 story-based music videos, featuring all the members of the band, released back-to-back, with LaPonza having completely returned to the band by 2022.

In September 2022, Dave "Gravy" Felton rejoined Mushroomhead as the second guitarist, rather than replacing Joe "Jenkins" Gaal. By the end of 2022, vocalist Jason "J Mann" Popson departed for the second time, alongside Rick "St1tch" Thomas. Vocalist Scott "x" Beck joined as a vocalist. Drummer Steve "Skinny" Felton also took on keyboards, sampling and water drums as his live role. As such, live drums are performed by Aydin Kerr and Robbie "Robbie Bobbie Shoes" Godsey, with studio drums and percussion, as well as live percussion and water drums being shared between the three.

On June 13, 2024, the band released the single "Fall in Line" and announced their ninth studio album Call the Devil.

On August 16, 2024, it was reported that Jeffrey Nothing had filed a lawsuit against Steve Felton in regard to unpaid royalties and copyright infringement. Nothing's attorney Ronald Stanley alleged that Felton had siphoned income under the alias of 'Tenafly Viper' as well as an unknown publicist and unknown writer. Stanley claims Nothing is owed at least $3.5 million and is entitled to use of band insignia. As of February 9, 2026, the lawsuit was settled out of court, with Hatrix claiming that Felton "came to the table amicably and honorably and we found a solution that made both of us happy." Hatrix further stated of his relationship with Felton that "from here on out it's nothing but positivity in that direction. I said I was done with drama and I meant it.

In December 2025, seven former members of Mushroomhead formed a new band under the name the Ex-Faces. It features Waylon, JMann, Gravy, Mr. Murdernickel, Pig Benis, Lil’ Dan, and St1tch.

In February 2026, the band was confirmed to be on the roster for the Louder Than Life festival taking place in Louisville in September.

== Musical style and influences ==
Mushroomhead's sound combines elements of heavy metal, hip-hop, experimental music, industrial music, gothic rock, punk rock and techno. The band's musical style has been mainly described as alternative metal, industrial metal, nu metal, and experimental metal. They have also been labeled as electro-industrial.

They are influenced by bands such as Mr. Bungle, Faith No More, Pink Floyd, Pantera, Nine Inch Nails, and KMFDM. In a 2014 interview with music journalist Greg Prato, Jason Popson reflected on the band's musical influences, stating "When you're talking about a band with nine guys, you're talking about tons of influences. I know when we started the band, we were really into a lot of the stuff Mike Patton was doing - Faith No More or Mr. Bungle, things like that. But we also liked heavier bands like Meshuggah, Pantera. Then there's electronic stuff. So it's really all over the map. It's everything from hard rock to punk rock to hip-hop to electronica. It's pretty vast."

== Artistry ==
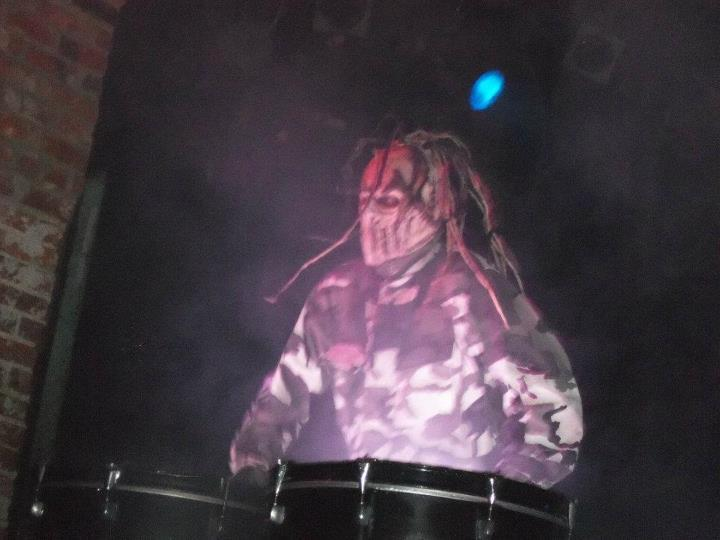
Drummer Steve "Skinny" Felton performing the water drums

=== Image and visuals ===
The members of Mushroomhead have identified themselves by wearing masks and by its distinct "X Face" logo – commonly worn on the masks of most members, as well as clothing and merchandise. The band originally adopted masks and stage names to not conflict with their original bands. The band's look has evolved over the years, featuring alterations to bring them up to date and freshen up the image for new albums and tours. In January 2013, Mushroomhead Video Director, Maskmaker and Make-up artist Dave Henson Greathouse competed in season 4 of original SyFy series "Face Off", a special effects prosthetic makeup reality show competition.

Another common visual trait that Mushroomhead is known for, are the use of water drums, which are performed by all the percussionists in the band.

=== Relationship with Slipknot ===
In the band's early days, the group repeatedly saw accusations of plagiarism due to sharing a similar distinct visual performance to Iowan metal band Slipknot, but the Mushroomhead band members have heavily denied the claims of "ripping off" Slipknot and insist that they were instead the first to adopt the masked aesthetic.

As a result of the comparisons, Mushroomhead has had an on-and-off rivalry with Slipknot since at least 1999. The feud erupted mostly among fans of both bands. Before signing Slipknot, Roadrunner Records was interested in signing Mushroomhead, but Mushroomhead passed on the deal. As of 2009, the drama has ended and both bands currently maintain a close friendship.

Following the death of Slipknot member Paul Gray in 2010, Mushroomhead posted on their official Myspace page: "R.I.P. Paul Gray, This feud needs to end. Much Love and Respect to the guys in Slipknot".

In 2012, Slipknot singer Corey Taylor has stated that he never had a problem with the band, he only had a problem with the behavior of their fans due to a situation Slipknot faced when they played in Mushroomhead's home town in Cleveland, and said there was never a real feud between bands but the feud was between Mushroomhead fans and Slipknot fans. He stated that doing a tour with Mushroomhead, Gwar, and Mudvayne "would be beautiful!". The same year, Mushroomhead members joined Slipknot's Sid Wilson on stage in an impromptu performance during Wilson's DJ set.

In 2014, singer Jeffrey "Nothing" Hatrix stated about the feud between the two bands: "Fans are very loyal to the bands they like. Members of both sides have said they are over it and that it was never really between the bands. Let's all move on".

== Band members ==
Current members

- Steve "Skinny" Felton – samples, keyboards, production (1993–present); percussion (2006–present); drums (1993–2022; studio 2022–present)
- Jackie LaPonza – vocals (2013–present)
- Steve Rauckhorst – vocals (2018–present); bass (touring 2007)
- Joe "Jenkins" Gaal – guitars (2021–present)
- Dave "Gravy" Felton – guitars (2000–2012, 2022–present)
- Scott "Strike" Beck – vocals (2022–present)
- Aydin "Alien" Kerr – drums (2024–present; touring 2022–2024); samples, keyboards, percussion (touring 2019)
- Simon Kanaris - percussion (2025-present)
- Joel Karschner - bass (2026-present)

Current touring members

- Jordan Gannon – percussion (2022–present)

=== Recording timeline ===
Role	Album									
Role	Mushroomhead (1995)	Superbuick (1996)	M3 (1999)	XX (2001)	XIII (2003)	Savior Sorrow (2006)	Beautiful Stories for Ugly Children (2010)	The Righteous & the Butterfly (2014)	A Wonderful Life (2020)	Call The Devil (2024)
Vocals	Jeffrey Hatrix	Jeffrey Hatrix	Jeffrey Hatrix	Jeffrey Hatrix	Jeffrey Hatrix	Jeffrey Hatrix	Jeffrey Hatrix	Jeffrey Hatrix	Steve Rauckhorst	Steve Rauckhorst
Vocals	Jason Popson	Jason Popson	Jason Popson	Jason Popson	Jason Popson			Jason Popson	Jason Popson	Scott Beck
Vocals	Jason Popson	Jason Popson	Jason Popson	Jason Popson	Jason Popson	Waylon Reavis	Waylon Reavis	Waylon Reavis		Scott Beck
Vocals	Jason Popson	Jason Popson	Jason Popson	Jason Popson	Jason Popson			Jackie LaPonza	Jackie LaPonza	Jackie LaPonza
Guitars	Richie Moore	Richie Moore	Richie Moore	Dave Felton	Dave Felton	Dave Felton	Dave Felton	Tommy Church	Tom Shaffner	Dave Felton
Guitars	Richie Moore	Richie Moore	Richie Moore	Dave Felton	Dave Felton	Dave Felton	Dave Felton	Tommy Church	Tom Shaffner	Joe Gaal
Guitars	John Sekula	John Sekula	John Sekula	John Sekula	Marko Vukcevich	Marko Vukcevich			Ryan Farrell	Ryan Farrell
Bass	Joe Kilcoyne	Jack Kilcoyne	Jack Kilcoyne	Jack Kilcoyne	Jack Kilcoyne	Jack Kilcoyne	Jack Kilcoyne	Ryan Farrell	Ryan Farrell	Ryan Farrell
Drums, percussion	Steve Felton	Steve Felton	Steve Felton	Steve Felton	Steve Felton	Steve Felton	Steve Felton	Steve Felton	Steve Felton	Ayden Kerr
Drums, percussion							Daniel Fox	Robbie Godsey	Robbie Godsey	Robbie Godsey
Water drums, additional percussion, supporting drums							Daniel Fox	Robbie Godsey	Robbie Godsey	Robbie Godsey
Water drums, additional percussion, supporting drums							Rick Thomas	Rick Thomas	Rick Thomas	Steve Felton
Turntables, electronics, samples	Joe Lenkey	Joe Lenkey	Marko Vukcevich	Marko Vukcevich	Rick Thomas	Rick Thomas	Rick Thomas	Rick Thomas	Rick Thomas	Steve Felton
Production	Joe Lenkey	Joe Lenkey	Marko Vukcevich	Marko Vukcevich	Rick Thomas	Rick Thomas	Rick Thomas	Rick Thomas	Rick Thomas	Steve Felton
Production	Steve Felton	Steve Felton	Steve Felton	Steve Felton	Steve Felton	Steve Felton	Steve Felton	Steve Felton	Steve Felton	Steve Felton
Keyboards	Tom Schmitz	Tom Schmitz	Tom Schmitz	Tom Schmitz	Tom Schmitz	Tom Schmitz	Tom Schmitz	Tom Schmitz	Rick Thomas	Steve Felton
Keyboards						Dave Felton	Dave Felton	Steve Felton	Steve Felton	Steve Felton
Keyboards						Ryan Farrell	Ryan Farrell	Ryan Farrell	Ryan Farrell	Ryan Farrell

== Discography ==
- Mushroomhead (1995)
- Superbuick (1996)
- M3 (1999)
- XIII (2003)
- Savior Sorrow (2006)
- Beautiful Stories for Ugly Children (2010)
- The Righteous & the Butterfly (2014)
- A Wonderful Life (2020)
- Call the Devil (2024)
