= Waylon Reavis =

American vocalist

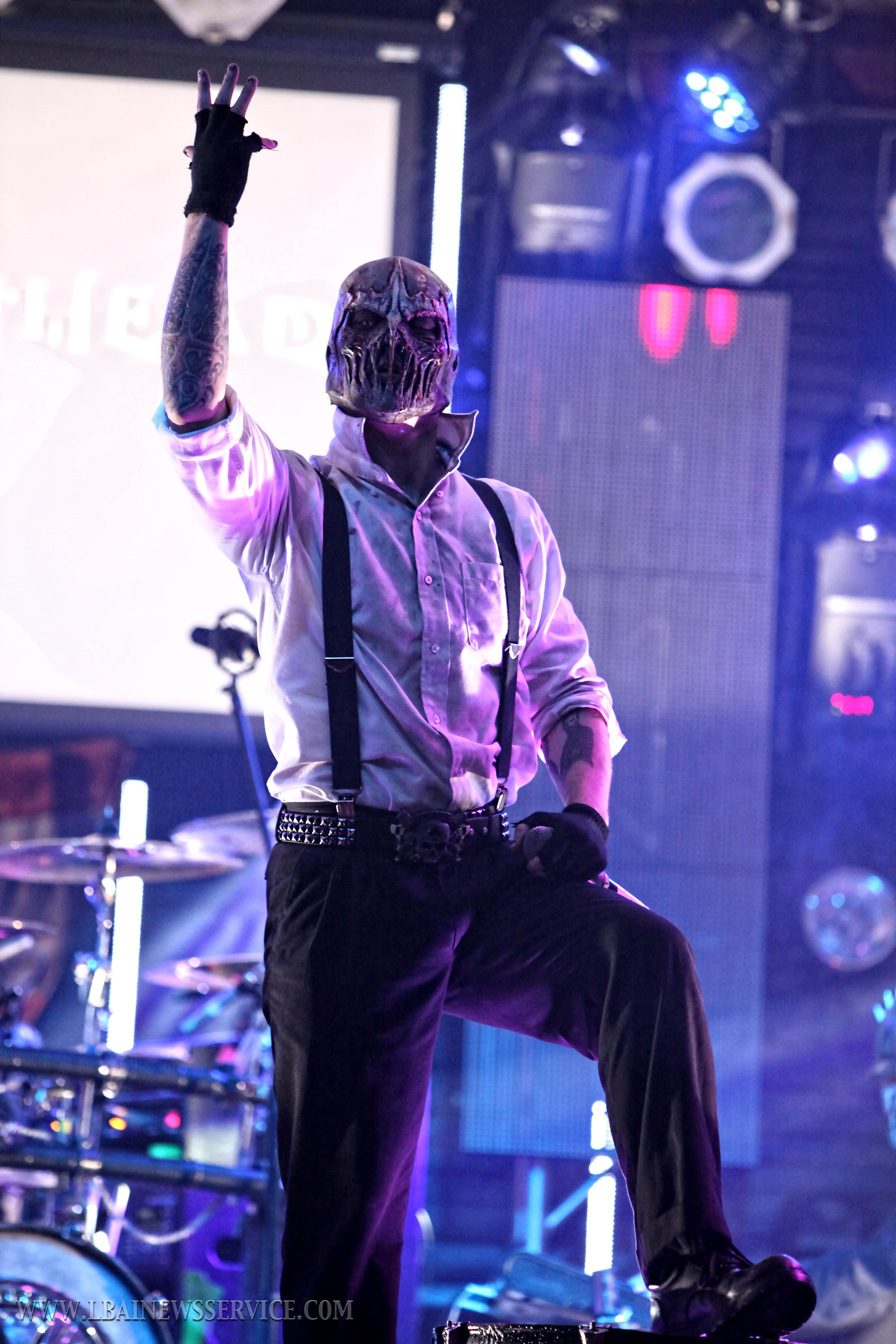
- Reavis in 2013

Background information
- Also known as: Waylon Reavis
- Born: September 19, 1978 (age 47); Wilkesboro, North Carolina, U.S.
- Genres: Alternative metal, industrial metal, nu metal
- Occupation: Singer
- Years active: 1999–present
- Labels: Eclipse, Universal, Megaforce, EMP Label Group MNRK Heavy
- Member of: A Killer's Confession; The Ex-Faces
- Formerly of: Mushroomhead; 3 Quarters Dead; Tenafly Viper

Waylon Reavis (born September 19, 1978) is an American musician best known for being a former vocalist for American heavy metal band Mushroomhead. He was in Mushroomhead from 2004-2015 and with them released three albums: Savior Sorrow (2006), Beautiful Stories for Ugly Children (2010), and The Righteous & the Butterfly (2014). He has also performed vocals for the Cleveland-based band Tenafly Viper and the alternative rock band 3 Quarters Dead. Reavis starred in the 2011 movie horror 13th Sign.

In September 2016, Reavis announced that his new project A Killer's Confession had signed to Megadeth bassist David Ellefson's EMP Label Group, and that their debut album Unbroken would be released in 2017.

== Mushroomhead ==
Reavis joined Mushroomhead in 2004, taking over vocalist duties from Jason Popson. Reavis remained in the band even after J Mann announced his return in 2013. He is identified by his facepaint and masks, all consisting of a swallow on his forehead.

Reavis announced on his Facebook fan page on October 5, 2015, that he was leaving Mushroomhead.

- Savior Sorrow – 2006
- Beautiful Stories for Ugly Children – 2010
- The Righteous & the Butterfly – 2014

== A Killer's Confession ==
In September 2016, Reavis announced on Facebook, then via press release, that his new project A Killer's Confession had signed a deal with EMP Label Group, which would release their debut album Unbroken in the spring of 2017. The album was partially recorded and mixed at Kentucky's Third Sky Studio with Reavis and co-producers Thom Hazaert and Richard Easterling.

On Halloween 2016, A Killer's Confession released their debut single "A Killer's Confession", featuring a guest performance by Korn guitarist Brian "Head" Welch.

The band performed a hometown show at the Cleveland Agora on December 17.

Discography

- 2017 – Unbroken
- 2019 – The Indifference of Good Men
- 2021 - Remember
- 2024 - Victim 1
- 2025 - Victim 2

== Other work ==
In March 2021, Reavis collaborated with electronic music producer Boom Kitty on the song It Takes Me, which was released as part of Beat Saber's fourth in-game original album. Reavis also worked with Boom Kitty on the song Don’t Question Me in October of the same year.
