= Jason Popson =

American vocalist (born 1971)

Jason "J Mann" Popson
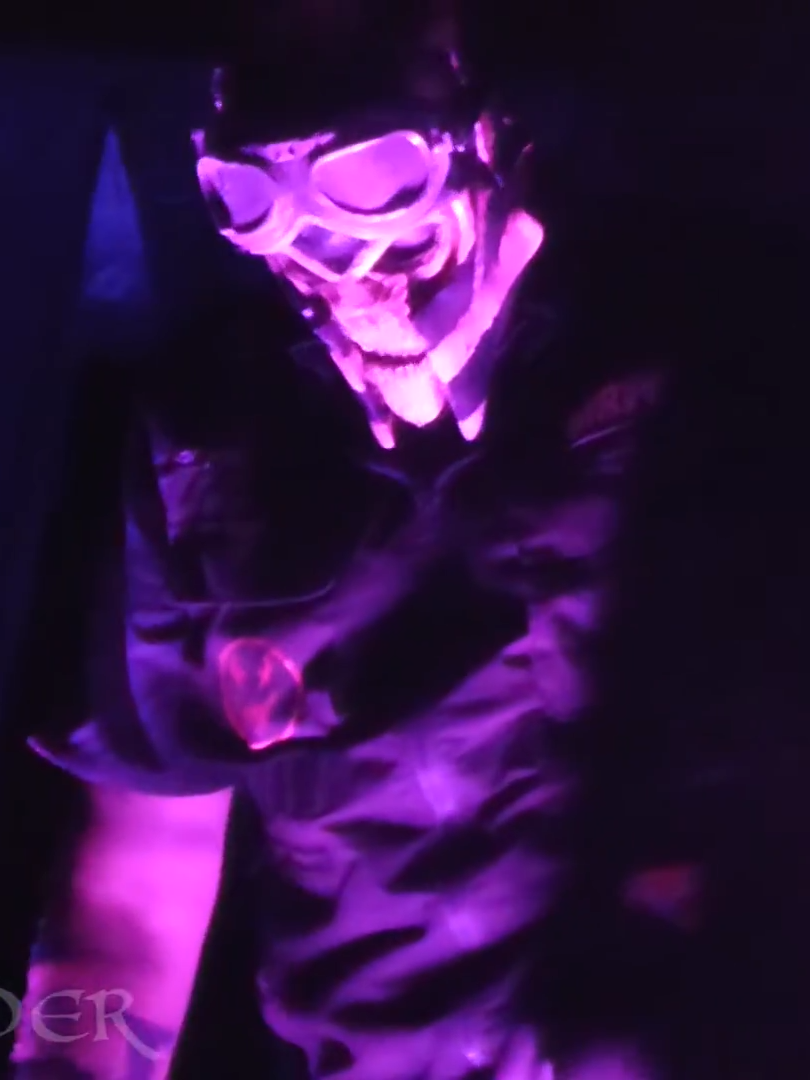
- Popson with Mushroomhead in 2016

Background information
- Also known as: J Mann
- Born: November 2, 1971 (age 54); Cleveland, Ohio, U.S.
- Genres: Alternative metal, nu metal, industrial metal, rap metal, groove metal, metalcore, hardcore punk, hip hop
- Occupations: Singer, rapper
- Years active: 1990–present

Jason Jonathan Popson (born November 2, 1971) is an American vocalist and rapper formerly for metal band Mushroomhead taking the stage name J Mann. Prior to his initial departure from the band he was identified by his face paint, which was based on the film Dead Presidents. From 2014 until his second departure in 2022, he wore a mask like the rest of the band.

== Biography ==
Popson left Mushroomhead in mid-2004 due to being overworked and his father's terminal illness. Though it was previously confirmed that Popson would be featured on Mushroomhead's new studio album Beautiful Stories for Ugly Children, it was revealed in an interview with Mushroomhead's lead singer Jeffrey Nothing that he would no longer be on the album. No specific reason was given. Popson began making periodic stage appearances during Mushroomhead songs some time around 2008 and has since performed with them numerous times, including filling in for an entire show in 2011 when Waylon Reavis was sick and unable to perform. As of 2013 J Mann announced on his personal Facebook that he has returned to the band.

Popson is an actor and musician who has been involved with the industry since the early 1990s. It has been hinted lyrically and in vague interviews that he was raised by a single parent—his mother—following the departure of his father from his life at a young age. However, Popson later regained a relationship with his father, which played a pivotal role in him leaving Mushroomhead.

Popson's father, John, died of cancer in September 2006, and in memory of his father, Popson performed a concert at Peabody's Down Under in Cleveland, Ohio on September 29, 2006. The concert acted as a benefit for his father's funeral, and featured Popson performing songs from many of his previous and current bands.

Popson is also in an extreme metal band with former Strapping Young Lad/Death drummer Gene Hoglan called Pitch Black Forecast, which also features Robert Reinard on guitar and Craig Martini recording studio bass. Martini performed in Pitch Black Forecast's inaugural shows, but was then replaced by Steve Rauckhorst for live shows. The band also added guitarist Tom Shaffner to its lineup. Pitch Black Forecast was formerly known as Absentee and the group's first release was on Popson's Melvins tribute album, released through his record label Fractured Transmitter, titled We Reach: The Music of the Melvins, on which the band covered the song "Revolve." Pitch Black Forecast independently released its EP Burning in Water... Drowning in Flame on August 11, 2012.

A metal project by Popson, titled Scelestus (pronounced sha-less-tus), released an EP through Megaforce Records in May 2011. The group also features Steve "Skinny" Felton of Mushroomhead and Tommy Church from Mushroomhead and Tenafly Viper. An LP is said to be in the works, but no official release date or confirmation has been reported. In 2013, he confirmed his return to Mushroomhead. His new mask resembles an undead spartan soldier. Popson is known for his rich baritone-like vocals. He left the band for the second time in 2022 and is replaced by Scott Beck.

== Side projects ==
- Pitch Black Forecast
- In Cold Blood
- Integrity
- Crossfader
- AM Factory
- Rape Whistle
- Lost Vegas
- State of Conviction
- Unified Culture
- (216)
- The Alter Boys
- 10,000 Cadillacs
- Bitch Wrangler
- Scelestus

== Discography ==
=== Mushroomhead ===
- Mushroomhead (1995)
- Superbuick (1996)
- Remix (1997)
- M3 (1999)
- XX (2001)
- Remix 2000 (2002)
- XIII (2003)
- The Righteous & the Butterfly (2014)
- A Wonderful Life (2020)

=== 10,000 Cadillacs ===
- Reap the Whirlwind (1999)
- Be My Guide EP (2000)
- 10K (2015)

=== (216) ===
- (216)/Schnauzer (1997)
- Two One Six (1998)
- Theme Song (single song released on the Kingsbury Run compilation album in 2000)

=== AM Factory ===
(Only one song has been released, which was included on the Mushroomhead Inc. Sampler album in 1998)

- "Deuce Balloon"

=== Lost Vegas ===
(Only two songs have been released)

- "All Bets Down"
- "It's Not Unusual" (Tom Jones cover)

=== Rape Whistle ===
(Only three songs have been released)

- "Playmate of the Year"
- "SKS"
- "Crowd Extermination"

=== Crossfader ===
(Only five songs have been released, one of which was included on the Kingsbury Run compilation album in 2000)

- "Death Is Certain... Life Is Not"

Other tracks:

- "Sew the Seed"
- "An Eye for an Eye"
- "Restitution"
- "Tear Gas and Gas Masks"

=== Bitch Wrangler ===
(No official album release. These four songs are posted on the band's MySpace page. These were also released under the Pitch Black Forecast compilation album As the World Burns, although one was renamed.)

- "Ballad of Glenn Schwartz"
- "No One is Innocent"

- Renamed "Innocent" in Pitch Black Forecast's compilation album.

- "Masochist"
- "Sycamore"

=== In Cold Blood ===
- Hell on Earth (1998)

=== State of Conviction ===
- Thoughts Light Fires (1996)
- A Call to Arms (1997)

=== Unified Culture ===
- Realize (1993)
- Numbskull (1994)
- To Know What's Up...You Have to Be Down (1995)
- Contra-Band (2016)

=== Pitch Black Forecast ===
- Absentee (2008)
- Burning in Water... Drowning in Flame (2012)
- As the World Burns (2014)

=== Chimaira ===
- The Infection (2009)

=== Integrity ===
- Integrity 2000 (1999)

=== The Alter Boys ===
- The Exotic Sounds of the Alter Boys (2005)

=== Scelestus ===
- EP (2011)

== Film appearances ==
Popson acted in a short film called Client 3815 with Ryan Dunn for the 2004 Philadelphia Film Festival. The film is an improvised thriller. Popson plays the role of Franklin, an employee at "Dream Control" who gets trapped in a client's dream along with a co-worker.
