= Jeffrey Hatrix =

American singer

Jeff Hatrix
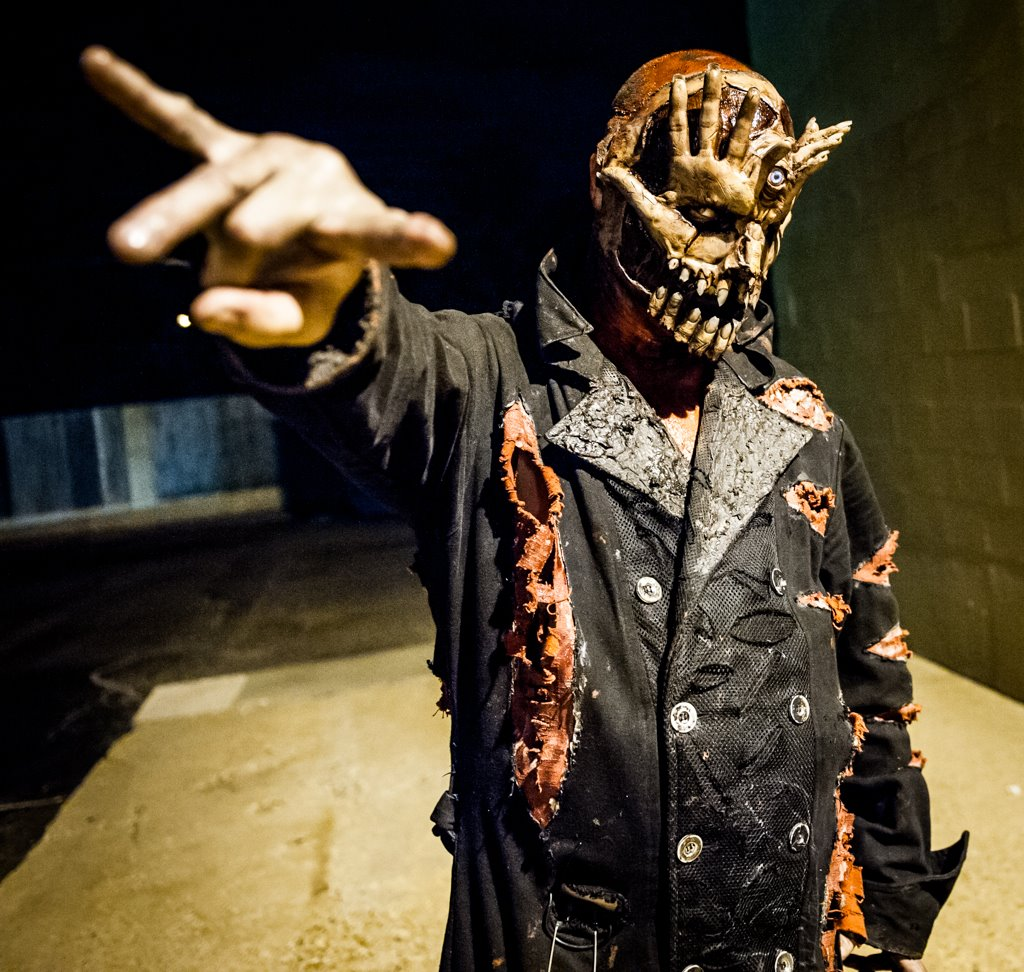
- Hatrix in 2014

Background information
- Also known as: Jeffrey Nothing, JNo
- Born: Jeffrey Lewis Hetrick; May 5, 1960 (age 66); Cleveland, Ohio, U.S.
- Genres: Alternative metal, industrial metal, thrash metal, industrial rock, nu metal
- Occupations: Singer, musician
- Instrument: Vocals
- Years active: 1980–present
- Label: Ulrich Wild's WURM Group

Jeff Hatrix, also known as Jeffrey Nothing and JNo (born Jeffrey Lewis Hetrick; May 5, 1960), is an American musician, best known as the Co- founder and former clean vocalist for the industrial metal band Mushroomhead. His nickname comes from a scene in Blue Velvet. With a wide variety of face paint and mask designs, Jeffrey's most known look is that of a butcher. However, he revealed a new look in the music video of "Your Soul Is Mine", showing a tan skin mask that somewhat resembles the infamous Leatherface from the Texas Chainsaw Massacre movies. Two of his masks were made from face-molds of famous actors Christopher Lee and Bela Lugosi. His most recent incarnation is that of a mask resembling human hands and fingers. He is signed as a solo artist to Ulrich Wild's WURM Group.

== Personal life ==
Hatrix was born Jeffrey Lewis Hetrick in Cleveland, Ohio. He grew up going to church and left at age 12 when he became agnostic. He is now a born-again Christian. He has a daughter from a previous relationship, married his second wife, Stacy, in June 2012 and is widowed as of 2024.

In early 2025, it was announced that Hatrix was diagnosed with cancer. On November 11, 2025, Hatrix revealed that his cancer was in full remission and that he took an entirely holistic approach to his treatment due to the toll he saw chemotherapy take on his deceased wife.

== Career ==
Hatrix was the co-founder and clean vocalist of the Cleveland-based metal band Mushroomhead. He was also the singer of the Cleveland-based thrash metal band Hatrix, as well as fronting the band Purgatory in the mid-1980s. Hatrix also played guitar in the band Foose, under the stage name "Bob Keeshan". In June 2007, Hatrix launched his own clothing line. In 2011, he began to pursue acting and starred in the movie 13th Sign with ex-Mushroomhead vocalist Waylon Reavis.

On New Year's Day 2011, Hatrix announced that The New Psychodalia album will be "Coming Very Soon" via his personal Facebook account. In June 2011, Hatrix's solo band Nothing signed to Suburban Noize Records.

When asked about the upcoming record, Hatrix stated: "The whole album is about escaping reality. People choose a variety of ways to feel better in the face of the depression that can be caused by trying to survive in a world that can seem completely uncaring and smothering," commented Nothing about the album. "'The New Psychodalia' is like a new safe hallucinogenic that makes all the ugliness in the world beautiful, with no harmful side effects. The entire album is kind of like a twisted, thought provoking view of the truths. It exposes the lies of the American dream that has really become more of a nightmare."

On August 22, 2011, Hatrix debuted the first single from The New Psychodalia on RevolverMag.com.

On March 7, 2018, Hatrix announced that he had left Mushroomhead.

Hatrix appeared in the 2021 horror film Dwellers, which is being directed by Drew Fortier and produced by David Ellefson and Thom Hazaert, via their newly formed production company, Ellefson Films.

On June 13, 2024, Hatrix teased the formation of 'Jeffrey Nothing's Mushroomhead' composed of other former members of the band, after previous vocalists such as Reavis and J Mann had resolved differences with the band. Therefore, confirmed members included only Church, Noah "Shark" Robertson and Marko "Bronson" Vukcevich.

On August 16, 2024, it was reported that Jeffrey Nothing had filed a lawsuit against Felton in regard to unpaid royalties and copyright infringement. Nothing's attorney Ronald Stanley alleged that Felton had siphoned income under the alias of 'Tenafly Viper' as well as an unknown publicist and unknown writer. Stanley claims Nothing is owed at least $3.5 million and is entitled to use of band insignia.

== All bands and projects ==
Here are all the bands or projects that Hatrix has been in:

- White Heat
- Purgatory
- Hatrix
- Mushroomhead
- Foose
- Jeffrey Nothing
- Doom Candy

== Band members ==
Current members

- Jeffrey Hatrix (Jeffrey Nothing) – lead vocals (2010–2014, 2018–present)
- Ian D Sniesak (The End) – co-lead vocals (2018–2023, 2025–present)
- Garret West (Hated Stranger) – co-lead vocals (2025–present)
- Claude Moore (Cletus Demetus) – guitars (2026–present)
- Benjamin Hambrick (Mangy James) – lead guitars (2026–present)
- Kross Patrick – drums (2026–present)
- Daniel Geórgios (Cujo Blu) – bass (2026- present)

Past members

- Ryan Farrell – guitars, keyboards, bass, backing vocals (2010–2014)
- Steve Felton (Skinny) – drums, vocals (2010–2014)
- Micheal Crough – bass (2011–2012)
- Joe Kilcoyne (Murdernickle) – bass (2011)
- Tommy Church – guitars, keyboards, bass (2012–2014, 2018–2023)
- Kahler Jakee Hatrix – bass (2018–2019)
- Noah Robertson (Shark) – drums (2018–2023)
- Steven Lee Adams – bass (2019–2023)
- Joshua Vargas (Gozer Butler) – bass (2026)
- Greg Hilligiest (Paul T. Giest) – keyboards, samples (2026)
- Nick Dees – bass (2026)
- Harry Mapes – keyboards, samples (2026)
- Brian Carter (Biny Blue) – bass (2026)

== Discography ==
With White Heat

- White Heat Demo (1982)

With Purgatory

- Purgatory E.P. (1985)
- Purgatory Demo (1985)
- Tied To the Trax (1986)

With Hatrix

- Collisioncoursewithnoplace (1994)

With Mushroomhead

- Mushroomhead (1995)
- Superbuick (1996)
- Remix (1997)
- M3 (1999)
- XX (2001)
- Remix 2000 (2002)
- XIII (2003)
- Savior Sorrow (2006)
- Beautiful Stories for Ugly Children (2010)
- The Righteous & the Butterfly (2014)

As Jeffrey Nothing

- The New Psychodalia (2011)
- 202SICK (2026)
