= Dave Felton =

American guitarist

Gravy
- Born: David Felton; February 25, 1967 (age 59)
- Genres: Alternative metal, Industrial metal, thrash metal
- Occupations: Guitarist
- Years active: 1984–present
- Labels: Eclipse Records; Universal Records; Megaforce Records
- Member of: Mushroomhead; (216); The Ex-Faces
- Formerly of: Integrity; S.O.S.; Hatrix; Space Chpacabra
- Website: spacechupacabra.com

David Felton (born February 25, 1967), known professionally as Gravy, is an American guitarist who is best known as a member of the Cleveland, Ohio-based heavy metal band Mushroomhead. He currently plays in another Cleveland-based heavy metal band Space Chupacabra.

== Biography ==
He also plays guitar for a metal cover band called S.O.S., a short stint in Jeff Hatrix's band Purgatory, Hatrix, and for the hardcore band (216).

Gravy's brother Steve Felton plays drums for Mushroomhead. Gravy wears a mummy-like mask based on the character from a horror movie with Xs on it (which are often painted with different colors of make up.)

Dave has finished a solo project CD titled "Daves Heavy Duty Demo" and has recorded several tracks with Mushroomhead frontman, J Mann.

Dave's earliest recorded work was with another Cleveland based band called "Centurion". The album was titled "Cross and Black", recorded in 1985.

== Equipment ==
- Custom Ibanez RG7420
- Ibanez Universe
- Peavey 5150 Series amplifier
- Marshall 800 series amplifier
- Randall Titan amplifier
- Randall XL cabinets
- Yngwie Malmsteen overdrive pedal
- D0D-308 pedal
- Ibanez tube screamer
