= John Sekula =

American guitarist (1969–2010)

- Also known as: J.J. Righteous
- Born: John Edward Sekula; January 14, 1969
- Died: October 28, 2010 (aged 41)
- Genres: Heavy metal, alternative metal, industrial metal
- Occupation: Guitarist
- Instrument: Guitar
- Years active: 1986–2001
- Label: Eclipse Records

John Sekula (January 14, 1969 – October 28, 2010) was the original guitarist for heavy metal band Mushroomhead.

== Biography ==
Also known as J.J. Righteous, was born and raised in Parma, Ohio. Sekula was mostly identified as wearing an Ace Frehley mask, a welding mask, a troll-like monster mask and a Ghostface mask. He was replaced by Marko "Bronson" Vukcevich in 2001 after several issues with the band and its members. While attending Parma Senior High, John Sekula formed the band Terror with his brother Brian Sekula. John Sekula also played guitar for both State of Conviction and Unified Culture who are/were fronted by Mushroomhead vocalist Jason Popson.

== Death ==
On October 28, 2010, Sekula suffered a massive heart failure and subsequently died. He was 41 years old.

== Discography ==
=== Mushroomhead ===
- Mushroomhead (1995)
- Superbuick (1996)
- Remix (1997)
- M3 (1999)
- XX (2001)
- Remix 2000 (2002)
