= Mushroomhead discography =

Discography of American heavy metal band

- Studio albums: 9
- Compilation albums: 1
- Singles: 18
- B-sides: 6
- Video albums: 4
- Music videos: 26

This is a comprehensive discography of official recordings by Mushroomhead, an eight-member heavy metal band from Cleveland, Ohio. Mushroomhead have released ten studio albums, two remix albums, one compilation album, twenty-one singles, six B-sides, thirty-five music videos, and four video albums.

== Albums ==
=== Studio albums ===
Year	Album details	Peak chart positions				
Year	Album details	US	US Ind.	US Rock	US Hard Rock	UK
1995	Mushroomhead: Released: April 3, 1995; Label: Filthy Hands; Formats: CD	—	—	—	—	—
1996	Superbuick: Released: September 13, 1996; Label: Filthy Hands; Formats: CD	—	—	—	—	—
1999	M3: Released: March 9, 1999; Label: Filthy Hands; Formats: CD	—	—	—	—	—
2003	XIII: Released: October 14, 2003; Label: Filthy Hands, Universal; Formats: CD, DI	40	—	—	—	—
2006	Savior Sorrow: Released: September 19, 2006; Label: Filthy Hands, Megaforce; Formats: CD, LP, DI	50	2	17	—	—
2010	Beautiful Stories for Ugly Children: Release: September 28, 2010; Label: Filthy Hands, Megaforce; Formats: CD, LP, DI	44	9	—	—	—
2014	The Righteous & the Butterfly: Release: May 13, 2014; Label: Filthy Hands, Megaforce; Formats: CD, LP, DI	20	1	5	1	—
2020	A Wonderful Life: Release: June 19, 2020; Label: Filthy Hands, Napalm; Formats: CD, LP, DI	—	38	—	—	68
2024	Call the Devil: Release: August 9, 2024; Label: Filthy Hands, Napalm; Formats: CD, LP, DI	—	—	—	—	64
"—" denotes a release that did not chart.

=== Compilations ===
Year	Album details	Peak chart positions	
Year	Album details	US	US Heat.
2001	XX (Note: XX consists of songs mostly from the band's first three studio albums, albeit either remixed or re-recorded; however, it's also the band's first release on an external record label. As a result, XX has been labeled as both a compilation album and as a studio album.): Released: May 18 (Eclipse), December 4 (Universal); Label: Filthy Hands, Eclipse, Universal; Formats: CD	178	6

=== Remix albums ===
Year	Album details
1997	Remix: Released: July 4, 1997; Label: ShroomCo; Formats: CD
2002	Remix 2000: Released: 2002; Label: Filthy Hands; Formats: CD

=== Demo albums ===
Year	Album details	Tracks
1994	Mushroomhead 4 Song Demo: Released: 1994; Label: Shroom Co. Records; Formats: cassette	A1 – Slow Thing"; A2 – "43"; A3 – "Untitled"; B1 – "Too Much Nothing"; B2 – "Indifferent"; B3 – "Casualties in B Minor"
On the J-card it says 4 songs, but actually has 6 songs total. Untitled (which was later titled Intermission) & Casualties in B Minor, were bonus tracks.

=== Unreleased albums ===
"The Goat"
This is a 25-minute audio skit (outtake), with Steve "Skinny" Felton. There is a short clip of it, in the beginning of the song "Our Apologies".

=== Video albums ===
Year	Album details
1997	Home Video: Released: 1997; Label: Filthy Hands; Formats: VHS
2005	Volume 1: Released: August 9, 2005; Label: Filthy Hands; Formats: DVD
2008	Volume 2: Released: October 28, 2008; Label: Filthy Hands, Megaforce; Formats: DVD
2018	Volume 3: Released: August 17, 2018; Label: Filthy Hands, Megaforce; Formats: DVD

== Singles ==
List of singles, with selected chart positions, showing year released and album name
Title	Year	Peak chart positions	Album
Title	Year	US Main. Rock	Album
"These Filthy Hands"	1996	—	Superbuick
"Before I Die"/"Solitaire/Unraveling"	2002	—	XX
"Along the Way"	2002	—	The Scorpion King Soundtrack
"Sun Doesn't Rise"	2003	—	XIII
"Eternal"	2004	—	XIII
"Kill Tomorrow"	2004	—	XIII
"Crazy"	2004	—	XIII
"Simple Survival"	2006	39	Savior Sorrow
"Just Pretending"	2007	—	Savior Sorrow
"12 Hundred"/"Save Us"	2007	—	Savior Sorrow
"Come On"	2010	—	Beautiful Stories for Ugly Children
"I'll Be Here"	2010	—	Beautiful Stories for Ugly Children
"Your Soul Is Mine"	2011	—	Saw VI Soundtrack
"Qwerty"	2014	—	The Righteous & the Butterfly
"Out of My Mind"	2014	—	The Righteous & the Butterfly
"Seen It All"	2020	—	A Wonderful Life
"The Heresy"	2020	—	A Wonderful Life
"Fall In Line"	2024	—	Call the Devil
"Prepackaged"	2024	—	Call the Devil
"We Don't Care"	2024	—	Call the Devil
"—" denotes a recording that did not chart or was not released in that territory.

== Music videos ==
List of music videos, showing year released and director

Title	Year	Director(s)
Simpleton	1997	Richie Moore
Solitaire/Unraveling	2002	Dean Karr
Sun Doesn't Rise	2003	Vincent Marcone
Eternal	2003	Marko Vukcevich, Steve Felton
Becoming Cold	2004	Mushroomhead
Kill Tomorrow	2004	Mushroomhead, David Greathouse
Before I Die	2005	Mushroomhead
Along the Way	2005	Mushroomhead
The Dream Is Over	2005	Mushroomhead
Simple Survival	2006	Chad Calek
12 Hundred	2007	David Greathouse, Robert Kurtzman
Burn	2007	John Carpet
Damage Done	2008	Robert Kurtzman
Erase the Doubt	2008	Mushroomhead
Damage Done (Volume 2 Version)	2008	Mushroomhead
Save Us/Embrace the Ending	2008	Steve Felton
Your Soul Is Mine	2010	David Greathouse, Kevin Greutert
Come On	2010	David Greathouse, Robert Kurtzman
Qwerty	2014	Steve Felton, Abe Robinson, Monobloc Studios
Out of My Mind	2014	Steve Felton, Abe Robinson, Monobloc Studios
We are The Truth	2018	Steve Felton, Monobloc Studios
Devils Be Damned	2018	Steve Felton, Monobloc Studios
Graveyard Du Jour	2018	Steve Felton, Monobloc Studios
Our Apologies	2018	Steve Felton, Monobloc Studios
We Are The Truth (Alternate Version)	2018	Steve Felton, Monobloc Studios
Seen It All	2020	Steve Felton
The Heresy	2020	Steve Felton
Madness Within	2021	Steve Felton, SK1 Industries
Carry On	2021	Steve Felton, SK1 Industries
A Requiem For Tomorrow	2021	Steve Felton, SK1 Industries
A Requiem For Tomorrow (Monochrome Edition)	2021	Steve Felton, SK1 Industries
Fall In Line	2024	Steve Felton
Prepackaged	2024	Steve Felton
Decomposition	2025	Creeptoons
