= XX (Mushroomhead album) =

Compilation album by Mushroomhead
- Released: May 8, 2001
- Recorded: 1994–1999
- Genres: Alternative metal; nu metal
- Length: 69:22
- Labels: Universal, Eclipse, Filthy Hands
- Producers: Mushroomhead, Steve Felton

Mushroomhead chronology
M3 (1999)	XX (2001)	Remix 2000 (2002)

Singles from XX
- 1. "Solitaire Unraveling" Released: 2001; 2. "Before I Die" Released: 2002

Professional ratings
Review scores
Source	Rating
Allmusic	4/5 stars

XX (pronounced Double X) is a compilation album by American metal band Mushroomhead, released in 2001. It was originally released through Eclipse Records, where Mushroomhead took classic tracks and remixed them. XX was re-released on Universal Records in December of the same year. XX contains tracks from the band's three independently released albums: Mushroomhead, Superbuick, and M3.

Being the first Mushroomhead album released on a major label, XX's re-release on Universal Records introduced Mushroomhead on a national and international level, while they were previously just a regionally known band. The album has sold over 300,000 copies. Musically, the album is primarily within the genres of industrial metal, nu metal and alternative metal with a diverse influence from genres such as gothic rock, punk rock, techno, and hip hop.

== Difference between versions ==
Compared to the Universal Records release, the Eclipse Records version contains clearer production that's more faithful to the original albums, a different track listing, and a hidden prank call. The original version features the newly recorded track "Epiphany". The reissued version removes "Epiphany", but includes the newly recorded track "Empty Spaces" along with remixes of "Too Much Nothing" and "Fear Held Dear".

== Music videos ==
"Solitaire Unraveling" is the only song from the album to have a music video produced, which was directed by Dean Karr. The video is set in a Southern California airplane hangar and shows the band in specially designed masks. According to J Mann, the song "acts as a metaphor for the cycles of life and the duality of man". Drummer and founding member Skinny adds, "It's very much us: dark, creepy, surreal." It found airplay on Uranium, Kerrang! TV, MTV2, and MTV2 Europe.

== Track listing ==
Eclipse Records version
No.	Title	Writer(s)	Originally appeared on	Length
1.	"Before I Die"	Steve Felton, Jeffrey Hatrix, Tom Schmitz, John Sekula, Jason Popson, Jack Kilcoyne	M3	3:13
2.	"Bwomp"	S. Felton, Hatrix, Schmitz, Sekula, Popson, Jack Kilcoyne	Superbuick	6:23
3.	"Solitaire Unraveling"	S. Felton, Hatrix, Schmitz, Sekula, Popson, Jack Kilcoyne	M3	4:37
4.	"These Filthy Hands"	S. Felton, Hatrix, Schmitz, Popson, Jack Kilcoyne	Superbuick	5:22
5.	"Never Let It Go"	S. Felton, Hatrix, Schmitz, Sekula, Popson, Joe Kilcoyne	Superbuick	4:41
6.	"Xeroxed"	S. Felton, Popson	M3	2:52
7.	"The Wrist"	S. Felton, Hatrix, Schmitz, Sekula, Popson, Jack Kilcoyne	Superbuick	5:09
8.	"Chancre Sore"	S. Felton, Schmitz, Popson, Jack Kilcoyne	Superbuick	2:35
9.	"The New Cult King"	S. Felton, Hatrix, Schmitz, Popson, Jack Kilcoyne	M3	5:12
10.	"Born of Desire"	S. Felton, Hatrix, Schmitz, Sekula, Popson, Jack Kilcoyne	M3	4:00
11.	"43"	S. Felton, Hatrix, Schmitz, Sekula	Mushroomhead	5:01
12.	"Epiphany"	Schmitz		2:55
13.	"Episode 29" (Based on the "Hardcore Mix" version from Remix)	S. Felton, Dave Felton	Mushroomhead/Remix	1:35
43.	"Bwomp" (Nord Mix) "Dark and Evil Joe"	S. Felton, Hatrix, Schmitz, Sekula, Popson, Jack Kilcoyne	Superbuick M3	14:51

Universal Records version
No.	Title	Writer(s)	Originally appeared on	Length
1.	"Before I Die"	Steve Felton, Jeffrey Hatrix, Tom Schmitz, John Sekula, Jason Popson, Jack Kilcoyne	M3	3:13
2.	"Bwomp"	S. Felton, Hatrix, Schmitz, Sekula, Popson, Jack Kilcoyne	Superbuick	6:26
3.	"Solitaire Unraveling"	S. Felton, Hatrix, Schmitz, Sekula, Popson, Jack Kilcoyne	M3	4:27
4.	"These Filthy Hands"	S. Felton, Hatrix, Schmitz, Popson, Jack Kilcoyne	Superbuick	5:23
5.	"Never Let It Go"	S. Felton, Hatrix, Schmitz, Sekula, Popson, Joe Kilcoyne	Superbuick	4:41
6.	"Xeroxed"	S. Felton, Popson	M3	2:57
7.	"The Wrist"	S. Felton, Hatrix, Schmitz, Sekula, Popson, Jack Kilcoyne	Superbuick	5:09
8.	"Chancre Sore"	S. Felton, Schmitz, Popson, Jack Kilcoyne	Superbuick	2:36
9.	"The New Cult King"	S. Felton, Hatrix, Schmitz, Popson, Jack Kilcoyne	M3	5:10
10.	"Empty Spaces" (Pink Floyd cover)	Roger Waters		1:51
11.	"Born of Desire"	S. Felton, Hatrix, Schmitz, Sekula, Popson, Jack Kilcoyne	M3	4:01
12.	"43"	S. Felton, Hatrix, Schmitz, Sekula	Mushroomhead	4:32
13.	"Fear Held Dear"	S. Felton, Hatrix, Schmitz, Popson, Joe Kilcoyne	Superbuick	2:18
14.	"Too Much Nothing"	S. Felton, Hatrix, Schmitz, Popson, Sekula, Joe Kilcoyne	Mushroomhead	3:10
15.	"Episode 29" (Based on the "Hardcore Mix" version from Remix)	S. Felton, Dave Felton	Mushroomhead/Remix	1:36
43.	"Bwomp" (Extended Version)	S. Felton, Hatrix, Schmitz, Sekula, Popson, Jack Kilcoyne	Superbuick	9:58

UK bonus tracks
No.	Title	Writer(s)	Length
16.	"Fear Held Dear" (Live)	Steve Felton, Jeffrey Hatrix, Tom Schmitz, Jason Popson, Joe Kilcoyne	2:24
17.	"The Wrist" (Live)	S. Felton, Hatrix, Schmitz, Sekula, Popson, Jack Kilcoyne	5:32

== Personnel ==
Tracks noted are based on the reissued Universal Records version. JJ Righteous was featured in the booklet for the original version whereas Stitch was featured in the reissued version.

Mushroomhead

- Jeffrey Nothing – vocals
- J Mann – vocals
- Skinny – drums
- Shmotz – keyboards
- JJ Righteous – guitars (tracks 1–9, 11–14)
- Pig Benis – bass (tracks 1–11, 13)
- Bronson – samples (tracks 1, 3, 6, 9, 11); guitars (track 10, Universal version)
- Gravy – guitars (tracks 10, 15)
- Stitch – samples (track 10, Universal version)
- Dinner – guitars (tracks 1–9, 11–14)
- Mr. Murdernickel – bass (tracks 12, 14)
- DJ Virus – turntables (tracks 2, 4–5, 7–8, 12, 14)

Additional personnel

- Steve Felton – producer
- Mushroomhead – producer
- Bill Korecky – engineer, mixer (Eclipse version)
- Pat Lewis – engineer
- Scot Edgell – additional vocals (track 9)
- Toby Wright – mixer (Universal version)
- Elliott Blakey – mix assistant
- Steven Marcussen – mastering (Universal version)
- Vanessa Solowiow – photos, layout and design, Russian voice (track 2)

== Reception ==
- CMJ (4/30/01, p. 17) - "Employs piano, clean vocals, and strong song structures; and beckons more to Faith No More ca. King for a Day or Fool for a Lifetime."

== Charts ==
Chart (2001–02)	Peak position
US Billboard 200	178
US Top Heatseekers (Billboard)	6
US Top Independent Albums (Billboard)	50
