= Violet Blend =

Italian alternative metal band

- Origin: Florence, Italy
- Genre: Alternative Metal Alternative Rock Symphonic Rock
- Years active: 2017–present
- Label: Eclipse Records
- Members: Giada Celeste Chelli; Ferruccio Baroni; Michel Agostini
- Website: www.violetblend.cloud

Violet Blend is an Italian alternative metal band founded in Florence in 2017.

The band has released two full-length albums and a live album and has performed in support of Radiohead., Garbage, Palaye Royale and many others.

== History ==
Violet Blend is an Italian band formed by Giada Celeste Chelli and Michel Agostini. The two began collaborating in 2014 and later decided to form a band. In 2016, they released the single Every Time (We Say Goodbye) on YouTube under the name Violet. In 2017, bassist Ferruccio Baroni joined the duo, giving life to Violet Blend. In the same year, they began collaborating with Lorenzo Fedi, who took on the role of manager of the band.

=== White Mask ===
On February 1, 2018, Violet Blend released their debut album White Mask. The album's presentation was accompanied by a guerrilla marketing campaign: over five thousand white masks with a painted purple V invaded the city of Florence, attracting the attention of citizens and national media, including La Nazione, La Repubblica, Il Mattino and Radio Freccia, which interviewed them live.

Each copy of the album features a real matchbox on the cover with the words "Burn your mask", a provocative message that invites people to reclaim interpersonal relationships in the age of social media.

White Mask received positive acclaim worldwide and attracted the attention of American record label Eclipse Records, which sings the band.

=== Demons ===
On April 1, 2022, the album Demons was released via Eclipse Records. The singles Rock DJ, Among All These Fools, Need and La Donna Mobile were extracted from the album. The latter song is the soundtrack of "La Donna Mobile – Campaign against Gender Discrimination and Violence", a social project against gender discrimination and violence in favor of AIDOS – Associazione Italiana Donne per lo Sviluppo with the collaboration and patronage of the Municipality of Florence and the Department of Equal Opportunities, of Biblioteca Riccardiana, of Teatro Verdi and Viper Theater The album was recorded, mixed and mastered at Alessandro Del Vecchio's Ivorytears Music Works by Andrea Seveso and produced by Giada Celeste Chelli.

=== Voices in my Head and My Head Is Broken ===
On November 2, 2023, the single Voices in my Head was released, to date the song is the most listened to of the band's entire discography. On April 28, 2023, the single My Head Is Broken was released in collaboration with the American post-hardcore band Tired Violence.

On October 27, 2023, the album Live and True, the band's first live album, was released. The album was recorded live in 2022 at the Viper Theatre in Florence and contains the 17 tracks of an entire concert performed in Florence.

== Tour ==
Violet Blend have performed across Europe, taking part in festivals such as I-Days Festival (Italy), Loverocks Festival (England), Wildfire Festival (Scotland), performing as headliner and as support act for many renowned bands such as Radiohead, Garbage, Palaye Royale, Chris Slade (AC/DC), Vinnie Moore (Alice Cooper), Hanabie and many more.

== Awards ==
The band has received several awards, including Band Revelation of the Summer 2019 from F.I.P.I., #insiemeperlamusica promoted by Cesvi, Elio e le Storie Tese e Trio Medusa, Band of the Year 2023 from Great Music Stories (UK).

== Band members ==
- Giada Celeste Chelli – vocals and piano (2017–present)
- Ferruccio Baroni – bass, backing vocals (2017–present)
- Michel Agostini – drums, backing vocals (2017–present)

== Discography ==
=== Studio album ===
- 2018 – White Mask
- 2022 – Demons

=== Live album ===
- 2023 – Live and True

=== Singles ===
- 2016 – Every Time (We Say Goodbye)
- 2018 – Venus Mask
- 2018 – Numb
- 2021 – Rock DJ
- 2022 – Among All These Fools
- 2022 – Need
- 2022 – La Donna Mobile
- 2022 – Voices in my Head
- 2023 – My Head Is Broken
