= Biblioteca Riccardiana =

Italian public library

- Location: Address: 10 Via Ginori, 50123 Florence, Italy - Region: Tuscany

Collection
- Size: 4,460 bound manuscripts, 5,620 unbound pages, 73,342 printed volumes, 725 incunables, 3,880 sixteenth-century editions, 258 periodicals.

Other information
- Director: Francesca Gal lori
- Website: http://www.riccardiana.firenze.sbn.it/index.php/it/

The Biblioteca Riccardiana is an Italian public library under the aegis of the Ministry of Culture, located inside the Palazzo Medici Riccardi at 10 Via de’ Ginori in Florence, in the neighborhood comprising the Mercato Centrale and the Basilica di San Lorenzo. Its main feature is preserving books collected by members of the Riccardi family and making them available in the very same rooms that were originally dedicated to that purpose. So, still today the library boasts the magnificent bookshelves, neatly carved and gilded, that create the atmosphere of a late-seventeenth-century patrician library, whose main features have all been kept intact.

Adjacent to this library is the Biblioteca Moreniana; although attached to one another, these libraries have a different history. They are also two separate entities from an administrative point of view, as the Moreniana is under the aegis of the Florence City Council.

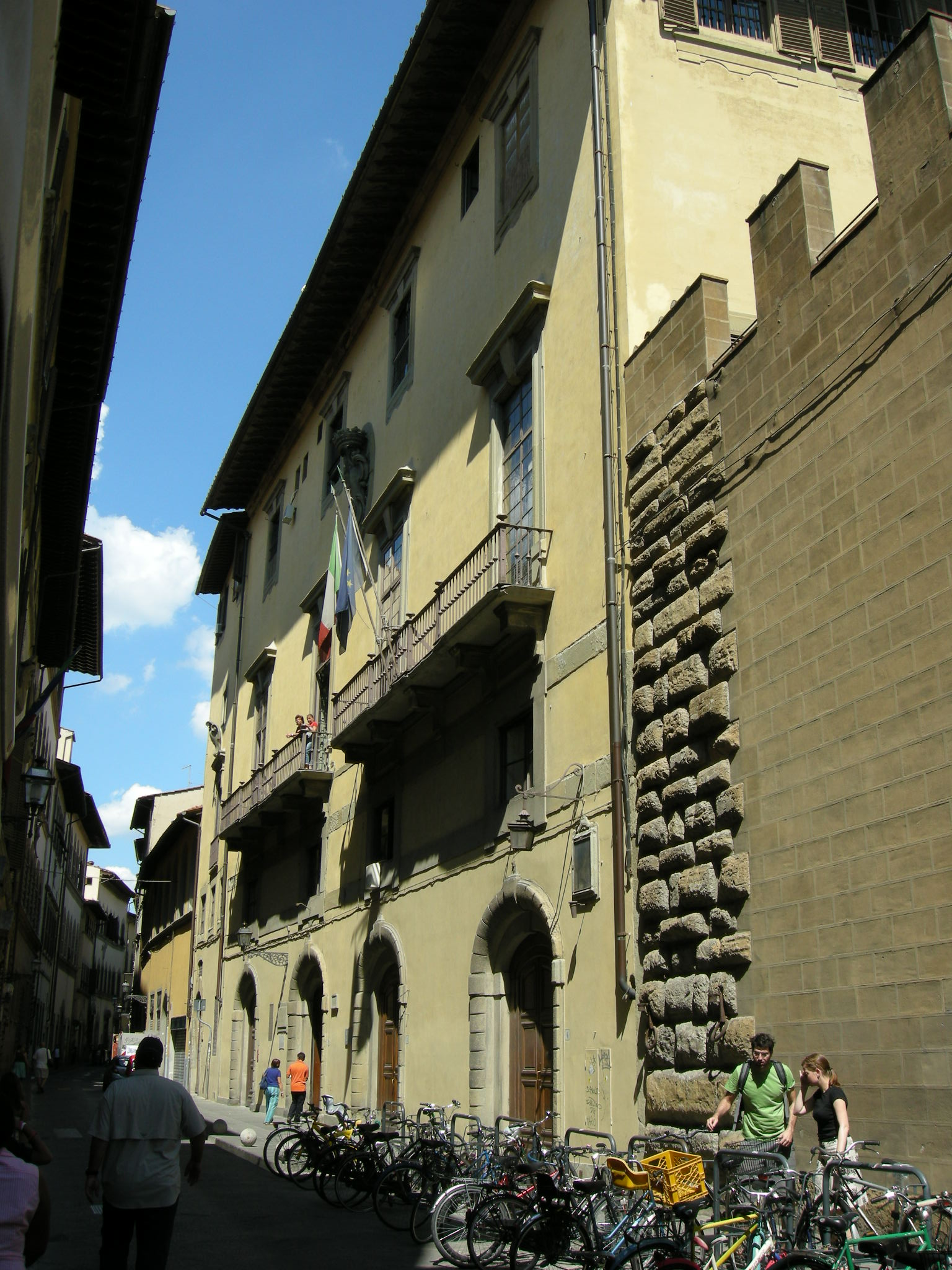
The entrance to the library on Via Ginori.

Index

1. The library: its history and its rooms
2. The book collections
3. Most precious works
4. The directors
5. Photo gallery
6. Notes
7. Bibliography
8. Related topics
9. Other projects
10. Further links

== A history of the library and its rooms ==
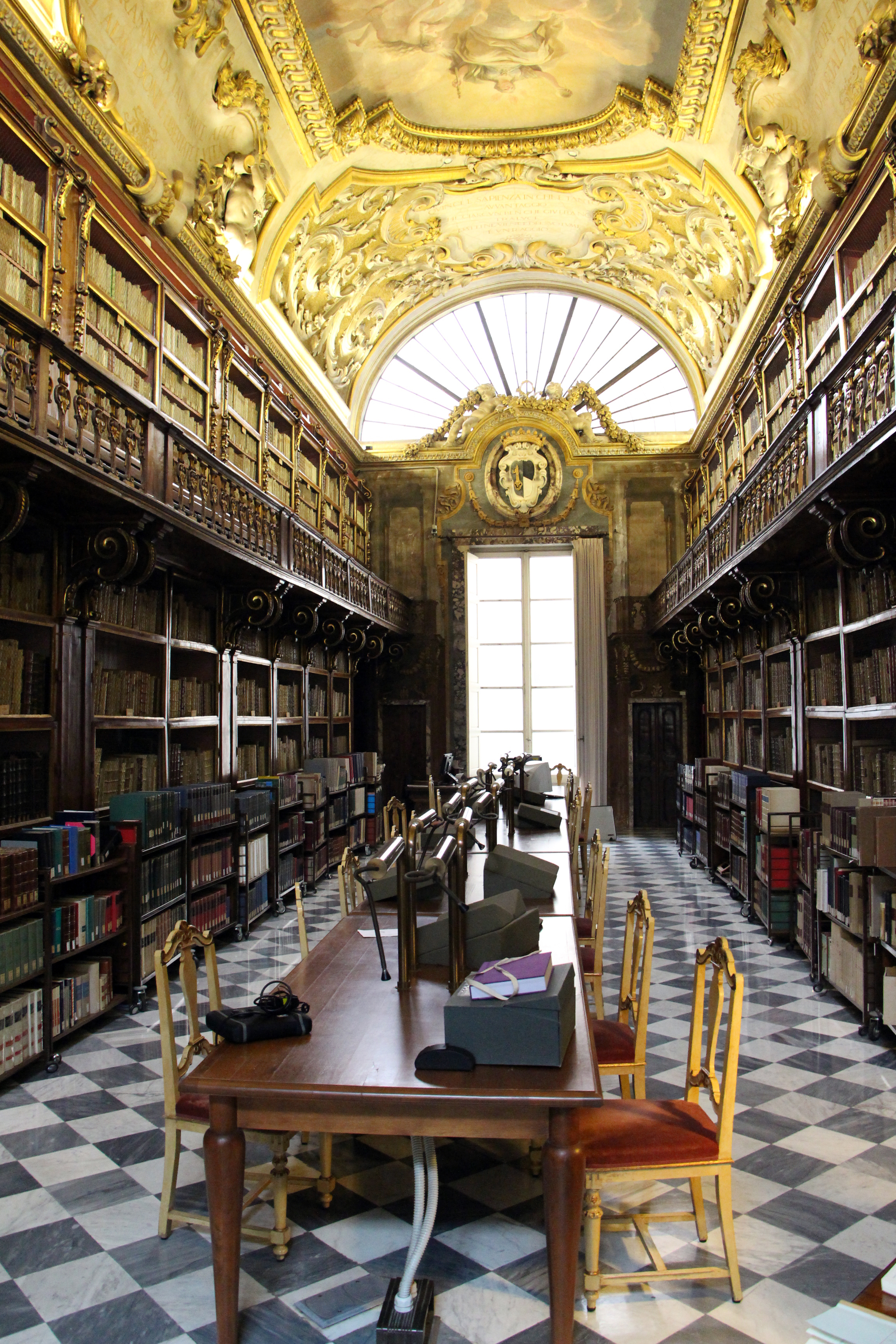
The Biblioteca Riccardiana reading room

The Biblioteca Riccardiana is housed on the back side of what was originally the Palazzo Medici (later and still today known as Palazzo Medici-Riccardi). The palace was purchased by Gabriello Riccardi (1606–1675) in March 1659. The entrance to the library is on Via de’ Ginori.

Replacing the family of the Tuscan grand dukes as owners of a building as rich in history as Palazzo Medici was a sort of consecration for the Riccardi, who came from humble origins and had only recently attained their noble status. At a time when the Riccardi's patrimony was inferior only to that of the Medici, Francesco di Cosimo (1648–1719) decided to invest the formidable sum of 115,000 “scudi” to restore, enlarge, and decorate the palace that his family had just bought. That led first to a complete change in the Riccardi's life and eventually to their financial collapse.

Marquis Francesco decided to readapt some rooms on the back side of the palace (on what is today Via de’ Ginori) to create a sort of “private museum” bringing together the various family collections that had hitherto been preserved in the family house on Via Gualfonda (in the building that is now 4 Via Valfonda in Florence). Those collections consisted of medallions, bronzes, gems, cameos, ivories, and works of goldsmithery as well as the library that Francesco's great-uncle Riccardo Romolo (1558–1612) had started putting together. The works commissioned by Francesco went on for about thirty years; they were temporarily stopped around 1670 (to purchase some adjacent apartments necessary to enlarge the palace) and then resumed at a fast pace. In 1689, when those works (including the façade on the Via Larga) were not finished yet, the gallery painted by Luca Giordano was inaugurated. The occasion was an event that involved the whole city, that is, the lavish celebrations for the wedding between Ferdinando de’ Medici (the grand duke's eldest son) and Violante Beatrice of Bavaria.

The artists in charge of restoring and enlarging the palace were – in chronological order – Ferdinando Tacca, Pier Maria Baldini, and Giovanni Battista Foggini. The latter was also entrusted with designing the interiors, while it fell to Luca Giordano (one of the most admired painters of the time, nicknamed “Speedy Luca” because of his ability at painting quickly) to decorate the ceilings of the main areas, i.e., the hall and the library.

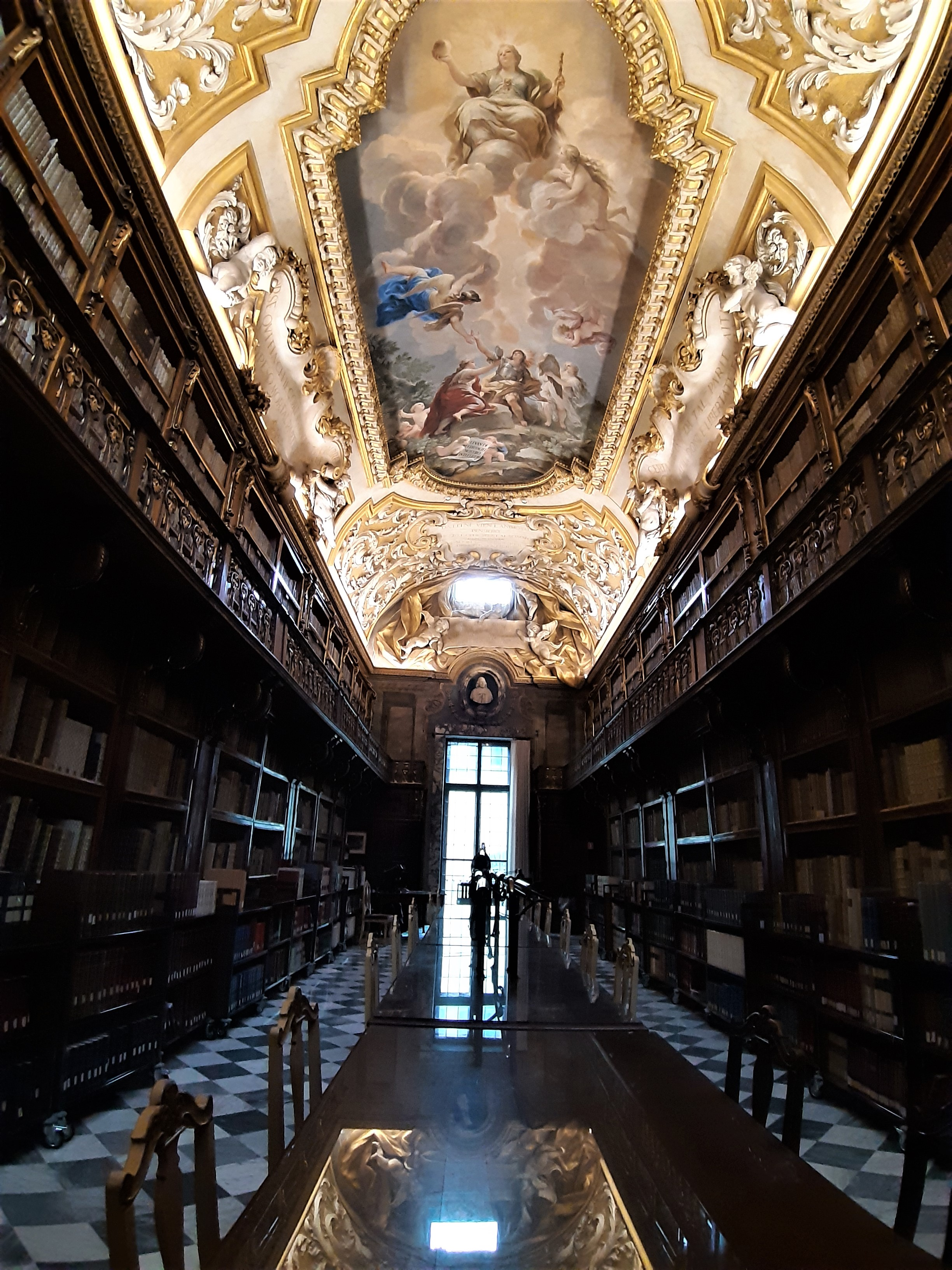
The Biblioteca Riccardiana reading room

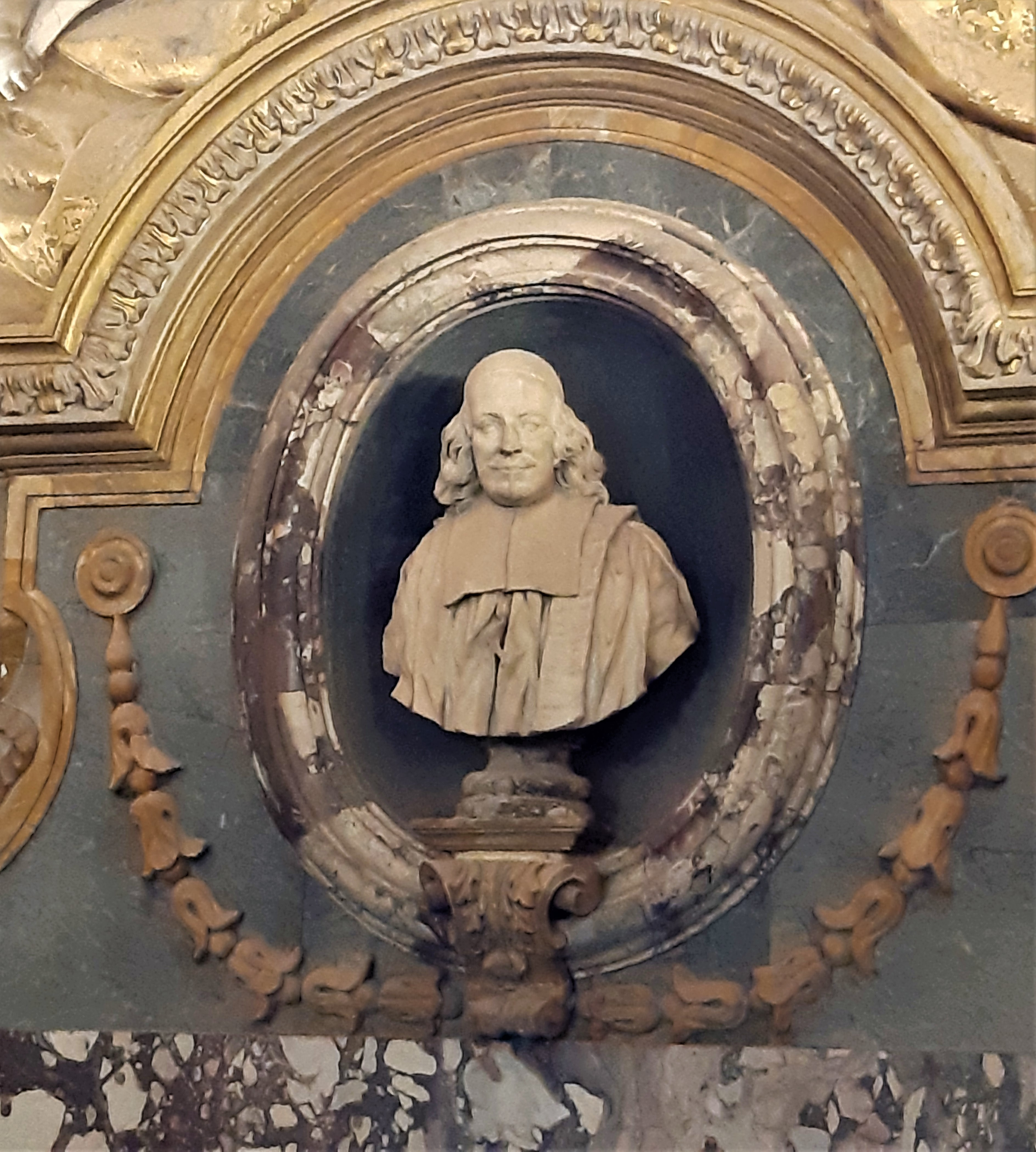
Giovanni Battista Foggini, Bust of Vincenzio Capponi (Biblioteca Riccardiana reading room).

The gallery and the library (the latter corresponding to what is now the reading room in the “Biblioteca Riccardiana”) were initially conceived as a single unit. For this reason, they share the same decorative program. The hall (which should be considered as a late Baroque Wunderkammer) served as a majestic vestibule leading to the library. The frescos by Giordano follow the program designed by Senator Alessandro Segni (scholar, secretary to the Accademia della Crusca, admired man of letters and tutor to Francesco). The fresco in the hall depicts the various stages in human life and its consequences (either rewards or punishments); the scenes represent human beings engaged in diverse activities, the personifications of the four seasons, and mythological figures against a natural background. The theme in the library's vault instead is the path to wisdom, understanding, and knowledge. The title of this scene – which was also painted by Luca Giordano (1685) – is “The Mind Understands the Truth”. In comparison with the fresco in the hall, this work is less complex and with a small number of figures, i.e., the personification of Divinity at the top, a naked maiden (the Truth), Theology, the Mind between the Science and the Philosophy at the bottom. The underlying meaning is as follows: understanding (which the Riccardi family promotes) allows human beings to raise above their natural state, thus ascending towards the light of truth. The latter is connected both with faith (thanks to Theology) but also with science, which we can reach in our earthly life through research and the use of human intelligence.

Francesco Riccardi also chose the furnishings and the kind of wood to be used for the furniture. To this purpose he hired two Florentine artisans, Tommaso and Giuseppe Stecchi, who had both to provide the wood and build the bookshelves. For the hall where he would give his parties, instead, Francesco had a series of wardrobes come from Rome and placed next to mirrors painted by Anton Domenico Gabbiani, Bartolomeo Bimbi, and Pandolfo Reschi.

In 1691 the two rooms inside the library today known as “Sala Esposizione” and “Sala Catalogo” were also painted to continue the decorative program that had until then involved only the most important areas inside the building. In both cases the topic addressed by the frescos is human destiny. The painters entrusted with decorating those rooms were Tommaso Nasini (1663–1746) and his cousin Giuseppe Nicola (1657–1736). The fresco in the Sala Esposizione is known as “Hercules at the Crossroads” (or “Hercules in the Garden of the Hesperides”), while the one in the Sala Catalogo shows “Jove Striking the Giants with His Thunderbolt”.

The Biblioteca Riccardiana was further enlarged in the second half of the 18th century, after the subdeacon Gabriello Riccardi (1705–1798) purchased more real estate property in 1786. A true bibliophile, Gabriello commissioned – in neoclassical style – what is now the director's office, which he dedicated to the Muses and Minerva. Allusions to classical culture can also be seen in the ceiling corners, whose four painted cameos hint at ancient works in semiprecious stones with portraits of famous philosophers and poets such as Cicero, Virgil, Homer, and Plato. The imposing bookshelves covering the walls on both levels of the director's office and the adjacent Sala Esposizione also date from those same years; access to the second floor is through a stairway placed behind a revolving set of bookshelves.

When the Riccardi went bankrupt in the early 19th century the family library and the museum were auctioned. In view of the auction, a catalogue (titled Inventario e stima della Libreria Riccardi) was published in 1810 and circulated both in Italy and in the main cities north of the Alps. Two years later, at the auction, a group of bookdealers (Piatti, Pagani, Todini, and Casini) bought the whole library collection for 98,000 “franchi.” They soon tried to sell it to the City of Florence for 130,000 “franchi.” Eventually an agreement was reached for 110,000 “franchi” to be paid within three years’ time. Having received permission to spend this sum from the Ministry of Interior Affairs, on April 29, 1813, the city council announced that the library had been purchased.

Consequently, no fewer than 3,590 manuscripts, 617 incunables and rare editions as well as 18,257 printed volumes became public property. The two Riccardi librarians – Francesco Fontani and Luigi Rigoli – were put in charge of the newly acquired book collection; they were to serve for free and make the library accessible to the public. In 1815, at the time of the so-called “Restauration Period,” the library became property of the Grand Duchy of Tuscany and passed under its control. Nevertheless, its public nature was preserved and on October 9 that year it was once again opened to the public. Things, however, were far from simple, especially after one of the two librarians mentioned in Gabriello Riccardi's will – Fontani – died in 1819. At that point, the only librarian left in charge of the Riccardiana – Rigoli – had to oppose a project aimed at merging that library with the Biblioteca Marucelliana.

In 1876 the “prefetto” of the Biblioteca Nazionale di Firenze was tasked to manage the Riccardiana as well. He continued to serve in this role until 1884. Eventually, in 1898, the director of the Biblioteca Laurenziana was assigned to oversee the Riccardiana too. After World War I the Riccardiana was closed for over twenty years, until 1942, when it opened again as a separate library, provided with its own administration. Like all state libraries, it fell under the Italian Ministry of Culture (specifically, the department known as “Direzione Generale Biblioteche e Diritto d’Autore”).

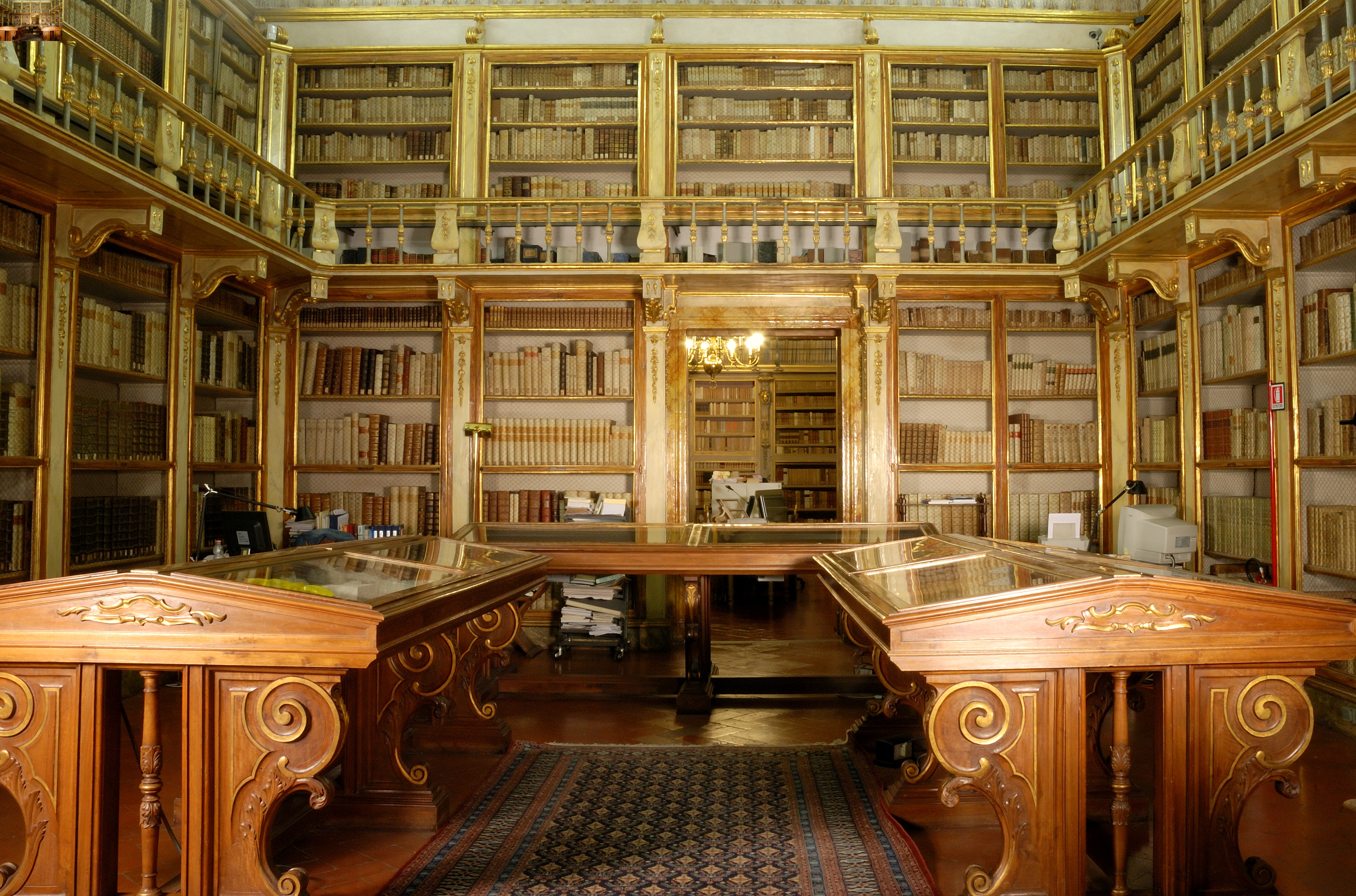
The Sala Esposizione.

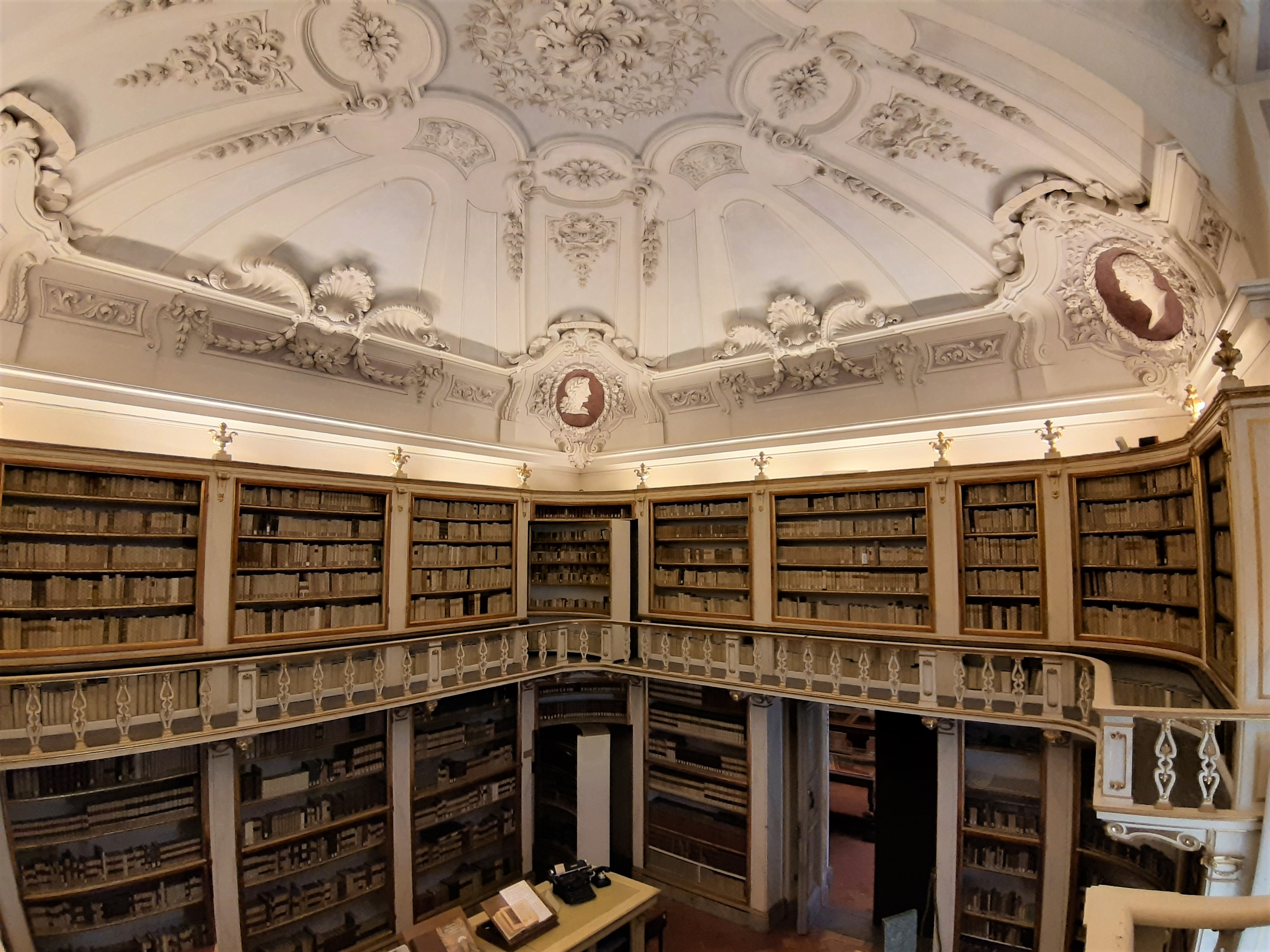
The director's office seen from the library's balcony.

== The making of the book collections ==
The library boasts a considerable number of books, consisting of both printed volumes and manuscripts; the latter preserve many texts that have not been either published or properly catalogued yet. It is thus not unusual to make new discoveries when reading those sources. The Riccardiana currently houses 4,460 bound manuscripts and 5,620 unbound folios, which include collections once owned by such scholars as Giovanni Lami, Giovan Battista Fagiuoli, Lorenzo Mehus, and Mario Pieri. As for its printed books, the Riccardiana holds a collection of 73,342 volumes, including 725 incunables and 3,880 sixteenth-century editions.

The manuscript collection shows how the Biblioteca Riccardiana has managed to bring together a large number of extraordinary private libraries (mostly Florentine and Tuscan ones dating from the 15th and the 16th centuries) that the Riccardi family bought over a long period of time. In doing so, the Riccardi purchased significant portions of book collections that originally belonged to such famous figures as Ficino, Landino, Bracciolini, Crinito, Fonzio, Nicodemo Francesco Tranchedini, and Benedetto Varchi or important families like the Pandolfini, Minerbetti, Nesi, Adimari, and Medici.

An inventory dating from 1632 informs us that the Riccardi library at the time consisted of almost 500 books (including both manuscripts and printed editions). A major change occurred when over 5,000 printed books and 249 manuscripts were added to the library at the death of Vincezio Capponi in 1688. That addition was part of the dowry of his daughter Cassandra, who married Francesco Riccardi; this increased the family's book collection substantially. Meanwhile, Francesco, in addition to receiving the former Capponi library, increased his own family's collection by purchasing many books, mostly during his grand tour and while living in Rome from 1699 to 1705. Once back in Florence in the Via Larga family building, he commissioned the inventories of his own museum collections. The book catalogue was prepared in 1706 by the first Riccardi librarian, the priest Filippo Modesto Landi (d. 1756), who in 1733 was succeeded by Giovanni Lami (1679–1770). Eventually, Lami published in several installments – between 1744 and 1756 – what can be considered the first alphabetical catalogue of the Riccardi manuscripts.

Cosimo's four sons took after their grandfather Francesco regarding their passion for books. This was particularly the case with Gabriello (1705–1798). A clergyman – and, more specifically, a subdeacon – Gabriello played an extraordinary role both in increasing and preserving the family library. First of all, he decided to separate the library's destiny from that of its various collections; to that purpose, he made the library economically self-sufficient and open to the public during regular working hours, also allowing some books to be checked out.

Gabriello also reorganized the Biblioteca Riccardiana as we still see it today. As for the books that were given on loan to scholars from 1737 onwards, one can find detailed information in a handwritten register that is still preserved in the library (MS Ricc. 3481). Gabriello not only bought books but also paid close attention to their looks by having them bound by artisans whom he knew personally and held in high esteem for their skills. Also, Gabriello's privileged relations with religious communities – due to his clergyman status – made it easier for him to purchase books frequently.

The books that Gabriello bought were never classified separately; instead, they were all added to the existing collection. For this reason, unlike most public libraries, the Biblioteca Riccardiana is still today organized as a single collection and its books are not catalogued according to several different inventories. The current manuscript list is basically still the same as the one registered in the 1810 Inventario e stima. On that occasion the two book collections making up the Riccardi library (one started by Francesco, the other by Gabriello) were merged – regardless of their origins – and organized according to the following progressive series:

- Ricc. 1-98: Greek and Hebrew manuscripts
- Ricc. 99-166: Greek and Latin manuscripts
- Ricc. 167-220: Arabic manuscripts
- Ricc. 221-1001: Latin manuscripts
- From Ricc. 100on onwards: Italian Classics manuscripts

From 1810 to the present the manuscript collection has been enlarged thanks to both acquisitions; it now consists of 4.460 exemplars.

The drawings collection

The Biblioteca Riccardiana owns 276 drawings. The sketches and the illustrations still preserved in the library are the remnants of a patrimony that was originally a lot larger and richer, being part of that collection of famous paintings that made the Riccardi family understandably proud. Some figure drawings are by Giovanni Battista Foggini, Giulio Campi, Bernardino Poccetti, Jacopo Chimenti (also known as “L’Empoli”), Anton Domenico Gabbiani, Giuseppe Zocchi, Pier Dandini, Jacopo Chiavistelli and other seventeenth-century Florentine masters, as well as architecture sketches by Domenico Cresti (also known as “Il Passignano”), the Valeriani brothers (Giuseppe and Domenico) and others.

Donations

Over time the library's patrimony has increased thanks to both acquisitions and donations. Among the latter are the 134 volumes of precious miscellaneous materials that once belonged to Giuseppe Del Rosso (donated in 1831), Mario Pieri's 55 manuscripts and his correspondence (1852), the rich collection of political papers bequeathed by Abramo Basevi in 1873, the letters (mostly on political and literary matters) that Leopoldo Galeotti left to the Biblioteca Riccardiana in his 1879 will.

Among the twentieth-century donations are Niccolò Rodolico's correspondence and books (which finally reached the library in 2019 after spending many years in deposit), those that once belonged to Renato Fucini and Giovanni Rosadi as well as the letters of Eleonora Duse and the drawings of Itala (also known as Mippia) Fucini.

The Riccardiana also owns the Collezione Segré and the Collezione Uzielli (mostly focused on Francis Petrarch and geography, respectively). Finally, the library preserves the collection that was once owned by fashion designer Sestilia Chiostri and her two sisters; it consists of drawings, sketches, photocopies, croquis, and photographs pertaining to this fashion firm's activities from the 1920s to the 1970s.

== The library's most precious works ==
Among the most remarkable works are fourteen nineteenth-century tablets in a Polynesian language (MS Ricc. 4125); written on both sides of tree bark, they report magic/religious formulas. Also, particularly noteworthy are three scrolls (in Greek, Arabic, and Hebrew, respectively, now MSS Ricc. I-III). MS. Ricc 1071 contains one of the earliest books of Tuscan cuisine; it was dedicated to a “pleasure-seeking fraternity” known as I Dodici Ghiottoni (The Twelve Gluttons). Other manuscripts contain texts handwritten by Petrarch, Boccaccio and by some of the greatest Renaissance humanists (such as Pico della Mirandola, Leon Battista Alberti, Marsilio Ficino, and Agnolo Poliziano) or by famous artists like Piero della Francesca and Bartolomeo Ammannati.

No less impressive is the collection of theatrical texts, which features charming stage sketches, including some that were specially made for the Grand Duke Ferdinand III (MS Ricc. 2444), script notes for actors, comedy plots and other such extremely rare materials that help us shed light on staging techniques, theater production, and a number of related matters. The Dante section of the Biblioteca Riccardiana is also conspicuous, including such manuscripts as Ricc. 1005 (also known as “Riccardiano Braidense”), that is, a Bolognese copy of the Divine Comedy – decorated with miniatures – consisting of the first two books, i.e., Hell and Purgatory (Paradise is preserved at the Biblioteca Braidense in Milan instead) with Jacopo della Lana's commentary; MS Ricc. 1035 (for which see the brief description below) and MS Ricc. 1040, a fifteenth-century exemplar whose first page features a famous portrait of Dante, showing those physical traits that tradition has always ascribed to him.

In addition to manuscripts, the Riccardi also collected precious incunables, such as Manuel Chrysoloras’ Erotemata (maybe the first book ever to be printed in Greek), and famous editions, including Savonarola's Bible (Ed. Rare 640) filled with notes written in his own hand.

Manuscripts

- Archimedes’ Treatises (Ricc. 106): This manuscript gathers several treatises by Archimedes. The over 200 marginal drawings illustrating them (including sketches of various kinds of spirals) are in Piero della Francesca's hand, thus attesting to this famous artist's attention to classical authors.
- The “Atlantic Bible” (Ricc. 221): This handwritten copy of the Scriptures from the first decade of the 12th century is also known as “Atlantic Bible” because of its extraordinary size (908 x 415 mm). It belongs to the class of the so-called Roman and Umbro-Roman "giant Bibles", the best-known among them being those of Saint Cecilia, the Pantheon, Todi, and the Biblioteca Angelica.
- Frederick II's Psalter (Ricc. 323): Dating from ca. 1235–1237, this copy was commissioned by Emperor Frederick II for his third wife. Its illuminations, in typical southern Italian style, are characterized by precise outlines in Byzantine fashion coupled with shiny colors and an abundance of gold in the decoration.

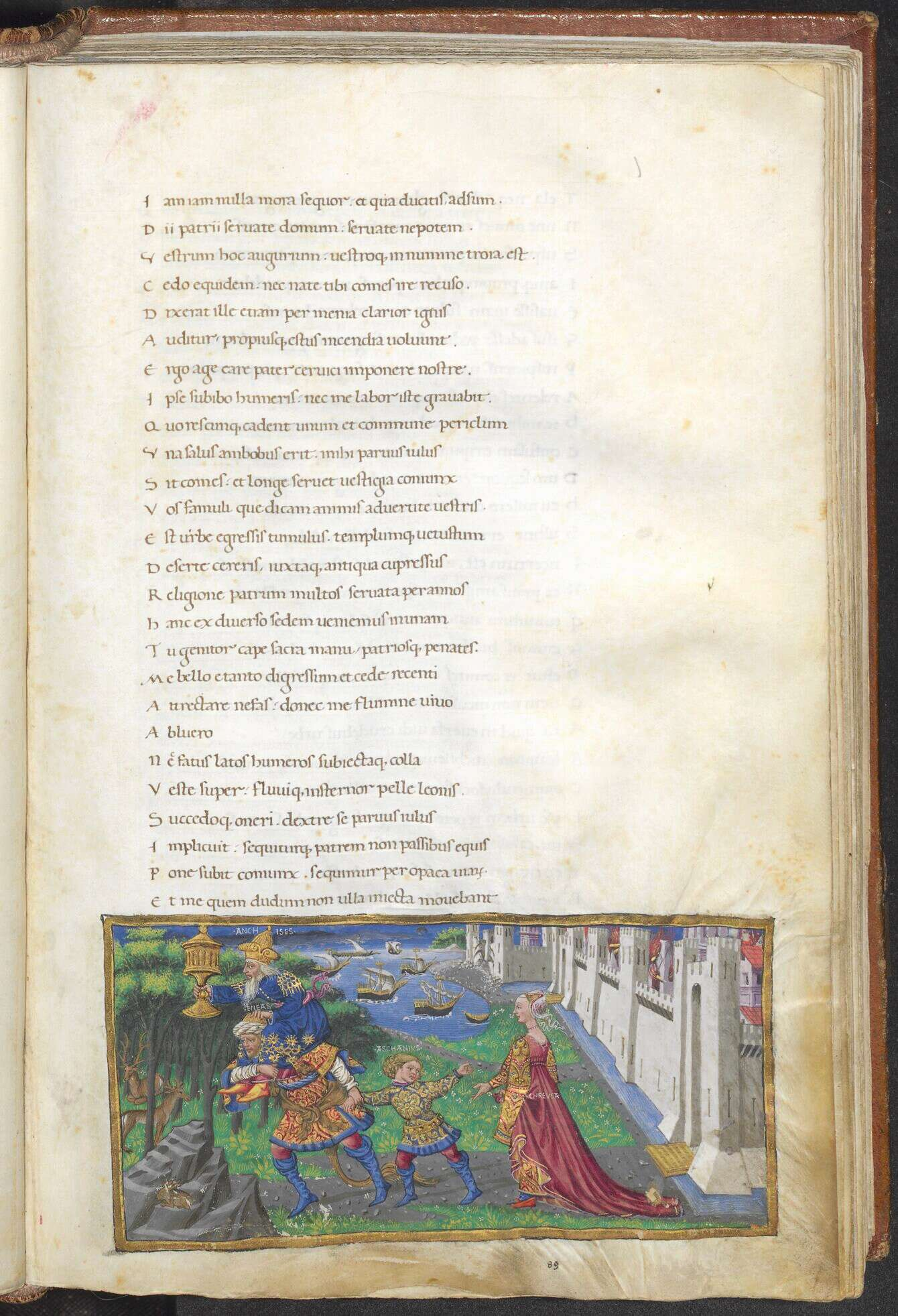
MS Ricc. 492, c. 89r (Virgilio Riccardiano).

- The Sant Margaret and Saint Agnese Legends (Ricc. 453): Produced in Bologna in the late 13th century by a bookshop specialized in the making of precious codices, this small yet extremely refined exemplar must have been commissioned by members of the highest rank.
- The Virgilio Riccardiano (Ricc. 492): It is the most famous manuscript of the Biblioteca Riccardiana, whose book collection it entered no later than 1706. Transcribed by “Nicolaus Riccius Spinosus” – one of the best-known copyists of fifteenth-century Florence – and illuminated by Apollonio di Giovanni and members of his workshop, it contains Virgil's major poems (i.e., that is, the Bucolics, the Georgics, and the Aeneid). More precisely, the lower margins of the manuscript are decorated with 88 miniatures (19 of which are incomplete) illustrating the texts.

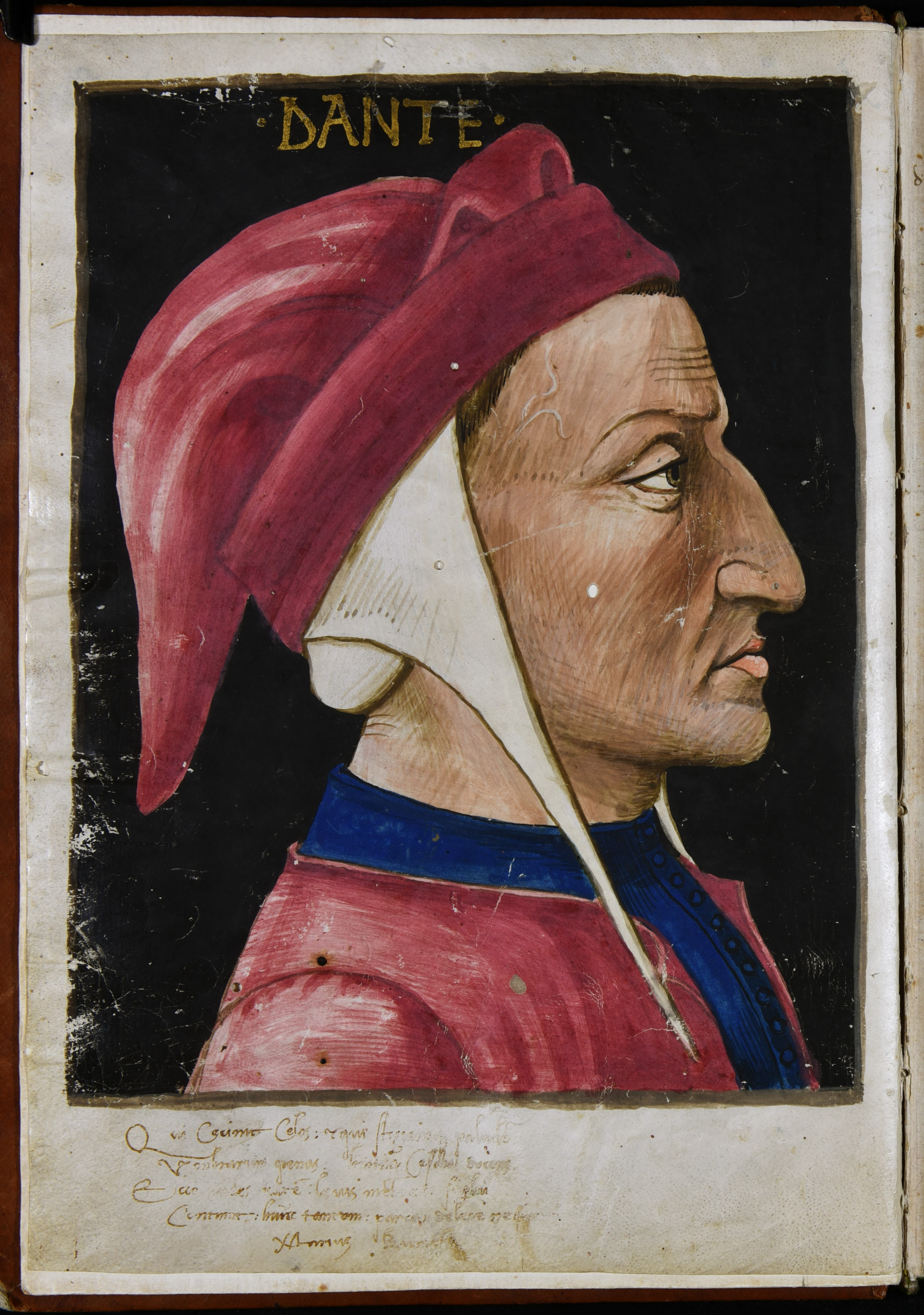
MS Ricc. 1040, f. 1v: Portrait of Dante.

- Dante's Divine Comedy in Giovanni Boccaccio's hand (Ricc. 1035): Dating from the 1360s, this copy of Dante's main poem is transcribed by Boccaccio, who also decorated it with seven drawings – in the lower margins of the folios – depicting scenes from Hell.
- Dante's Rhymes (Ricc. 1040): Written between 1440 and 1450, the first folio of this codex (f. Iv) features a famous portrait of Dante, showing the facial features that Boccaccio ascribed to him, maybe basing himself on a funerary mask of the poet.
- Cookbook or Recipes for Making Good Dishes (Ricc. 1071): Dating from the first quarter of the 14th century, it is regarded as the oldest Italian cookbook. It now contains 57 recipes; yet, originally, it must have had at least 72.
- Giuliano de’ Medici's Abacus or Mathematical Treatise (Ricc. 2669): This precious manuscript was commissioned by Lorenzo “The Magnificent” for his son Giuliano, the future Duke of Nemours. As a Liber Abaci (Book of Calculation) this text gives fundamental information to learn about commerce. Yet, in addition to being a schoolbook that teaches the basics on a specific subject, this text conveys a subtler message, as it praises the house of Medici through coats-of-arms and sketches alluding to scenes from Florentine daily life that have to do with the main local trades. As such, the illuminations decorating this manuscript provide precious information on the techniques and utensils that were used in Florence in the second half of the 15th century.
- Francesco Ghisolfo's Nautical Atlases (Ricc. 3615–3616): These richly decorated masterpieces of nautical cartography, reporting the two atlases produced by Genoese cartographer Francesco Ghisolfo, belonged to the Medici family. They probably date from the first half of the 16th century. MS Ricc. 3616 was originally made for the Martellis but it was eventually donated to Francesco I de’ Medici (son of Cosimo I) with an accompanying dedication and a laudatory sonnet. MS Ricc. 3615, instead, bears on the cover a coat of arms under a cardinal's hat; it may refer either to Ferdinando de’ Medici (who was elected cardinal in 1563) or Giovanni de’ Medici. Ghisolfo probably drew inspiration for his atlases from the more than seventy nautical maps that Battista Agnese's workshop produced in Venice from 1536 to 1564.
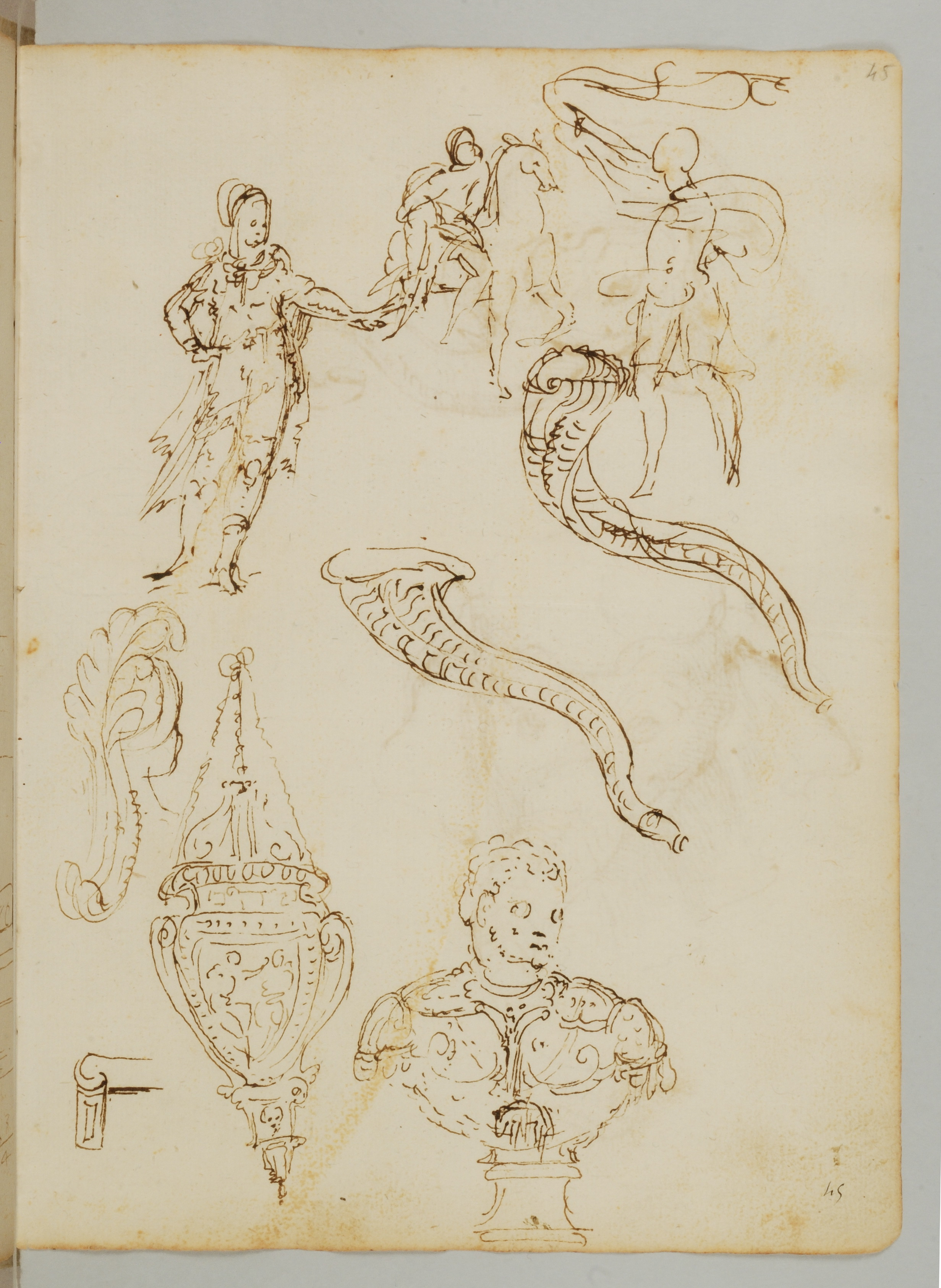
  Ed. rare 120, f. 45r: Bartolomeo Ammannati's sketchbook (bust of Cosimo I de’ Medici wearing a classicizing armor).
- Handwritten copy of Machiavelli's The Prince (Ricc. 2603): Transcribed by Biagio Buonaccorsi (d. 1521), this manuscript is one of earliest handwritten copies of Machiavelli famous treatise before the 1532 editio princeps.
- Architecture treatise or Bartolomeo Ammannati's drawing notebook (Ed. rare 120): Put together in the course of the 19th century without following any precise chronological order, these 114 folios are covered with drawings, sketches, and notes in Ammannati's own hand that address subjects as diverse as math, geometry, architecture, studies on fortresses, and measurement systems. All of them were meant as projects for the Medici family, some of which were eventually realized. Among Ammannati's various studies collected in this volume is one for a bust of Grand Duke Cosimo I (c.45r) wearing a classicize.

Printed books

- Life of Francesco Sforza (Ed. rare 428): A magnificent copy of this biography, dedicated to the emperor, displaying a richly decorated frontispiece.
- Bible with Girolamo Savonarola's notes (Ed. rare 640): Preserved in the monastery of Santa Lucia at Camporeggi until the second half of the 18th century, this small text (decorated with blue and red initials for each section) bears many small glosses by Savonarola. In view of the sermons that he would give, the famous Dominican preacher used to cover with tiny notes the margins of his own liturgical books and copies of the Bible.
- Dante's Divine Comedy (Ed. rare 691): It is the first Florentine edition of Dante's main poem with Cristoforo Landino's commentary and 21 woodcuts based on Sandro Botticelli's drawings. Most likely, Botticelli is also the author of a drawing (a winged female figure holding an armillary sphere, probably to be identified with Urania) in a refined small copy of the Fiore di virtù (Ricc. 1711, f. 1v) illuminated by Antonio di Niccolò.

== Directors ==
- Alessandro Bulgarini (1859–1875)
- 1876-1898: The Biblioteca Riccardiana is under the aegis of the Biblioteca Nazionale Centrale di Firenze. The Riccardiana head librarians are Prospero Viani (1884–1888) and Salomone Morpurgo (1888–1898).
- 1898 – 1 March 1942: From an administrative point of view, the Biblioteca Riccardiana merges with the Biblioteca Medicea Laurenziana.
- March 1942 – April 1953: Irma Merolle Tondi.
- May 1953 – December/January 1954/1955: Giovanni Semerano.
- January/February 1955 – September 1956: Alberto Giraldi.
- October 1956 – May/June 1967: Berta Maracchi Biagiarelli.
- June 1967 – November 1970: Irma Merolle Tondi.
- December 1970 – May 1973: Antonietta Morandini.
- June 1973 – May 1983: Maria Jole Minicucci (on leave from 1974 to 1976).
- 1983 – 1985: Carla Guiducci Bonanni.
- 1985 – 1986: Maria Jole Minicucci.
- 1986 – 1995: Maria Prunai Falciani.
- 1996 – 2015: Giovanna Lazzi.
- 2015 – 2018: Fulvio Silvano Stacchetti.
- 2018 – present: Francesca Gallori.

== Gallery ==
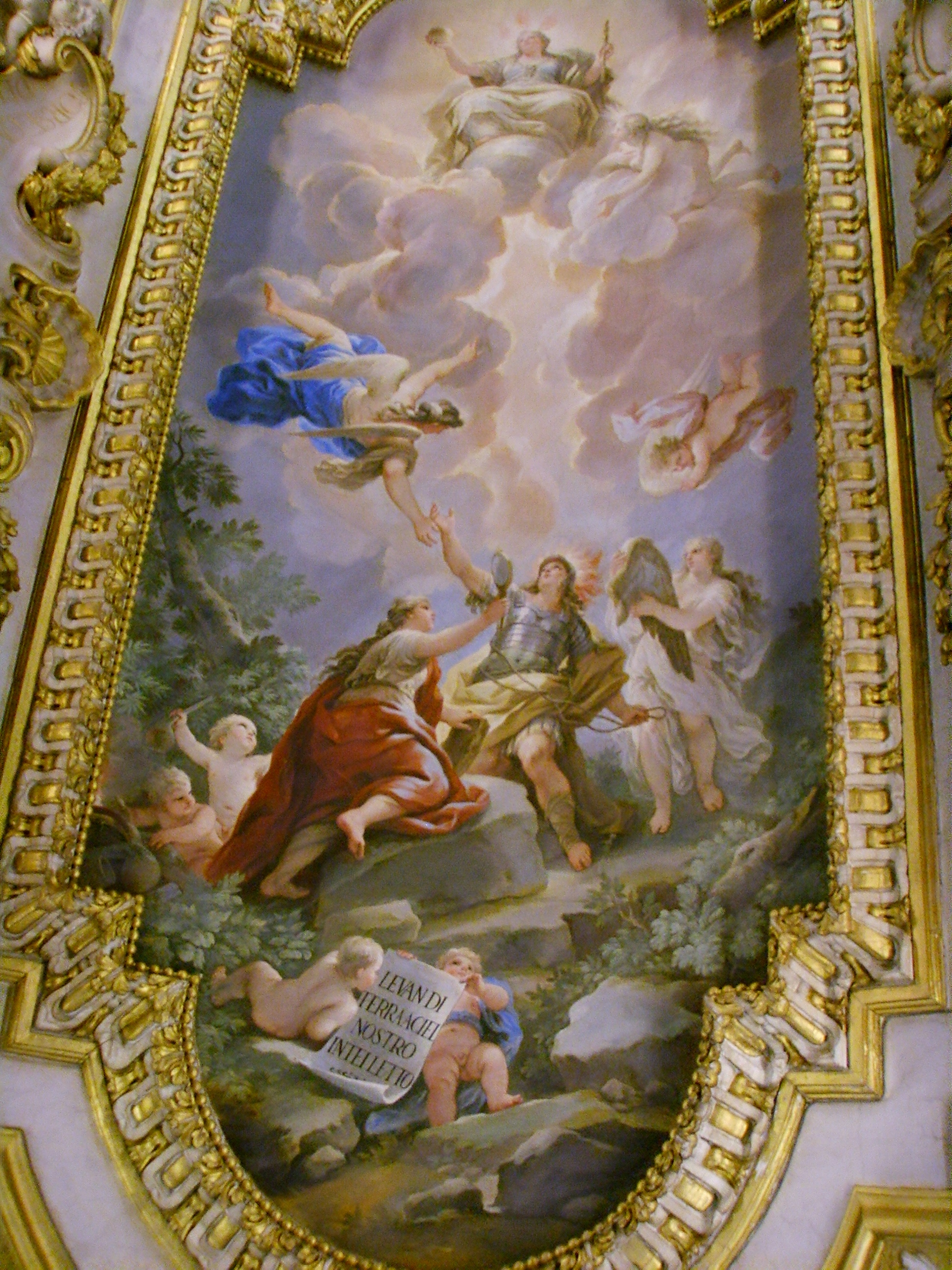
Luca Giordano, The Mind understands the Truth, fresco, Biblioteca Riccardiana reading room.

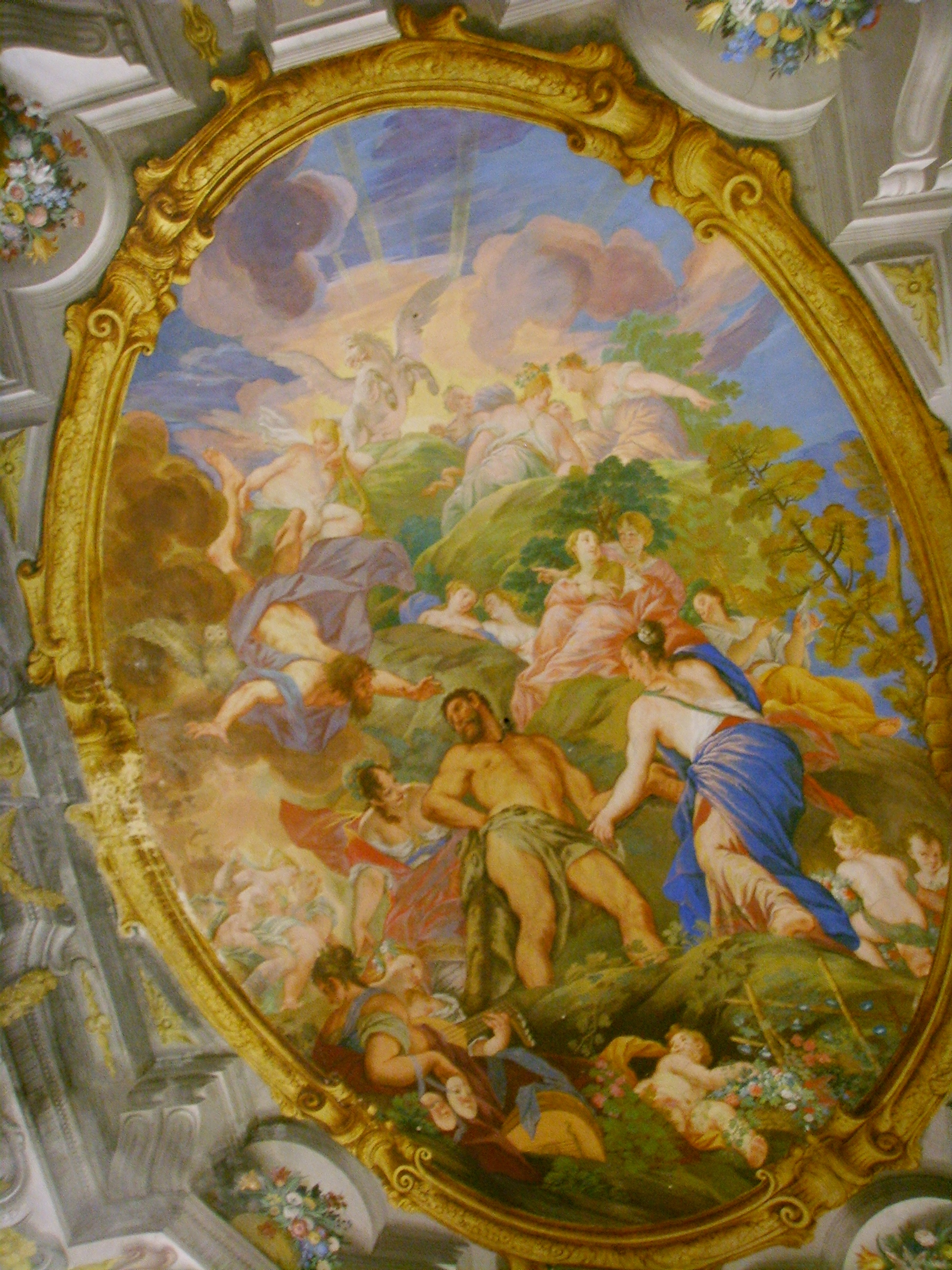
Giuseppe Nicola and Tommaso Nasini, Hercules at the Crossroads or Hercules in the Garden of the Hesperides, fresco, Biblioteca Riccardiana, The Sala Esposizione.

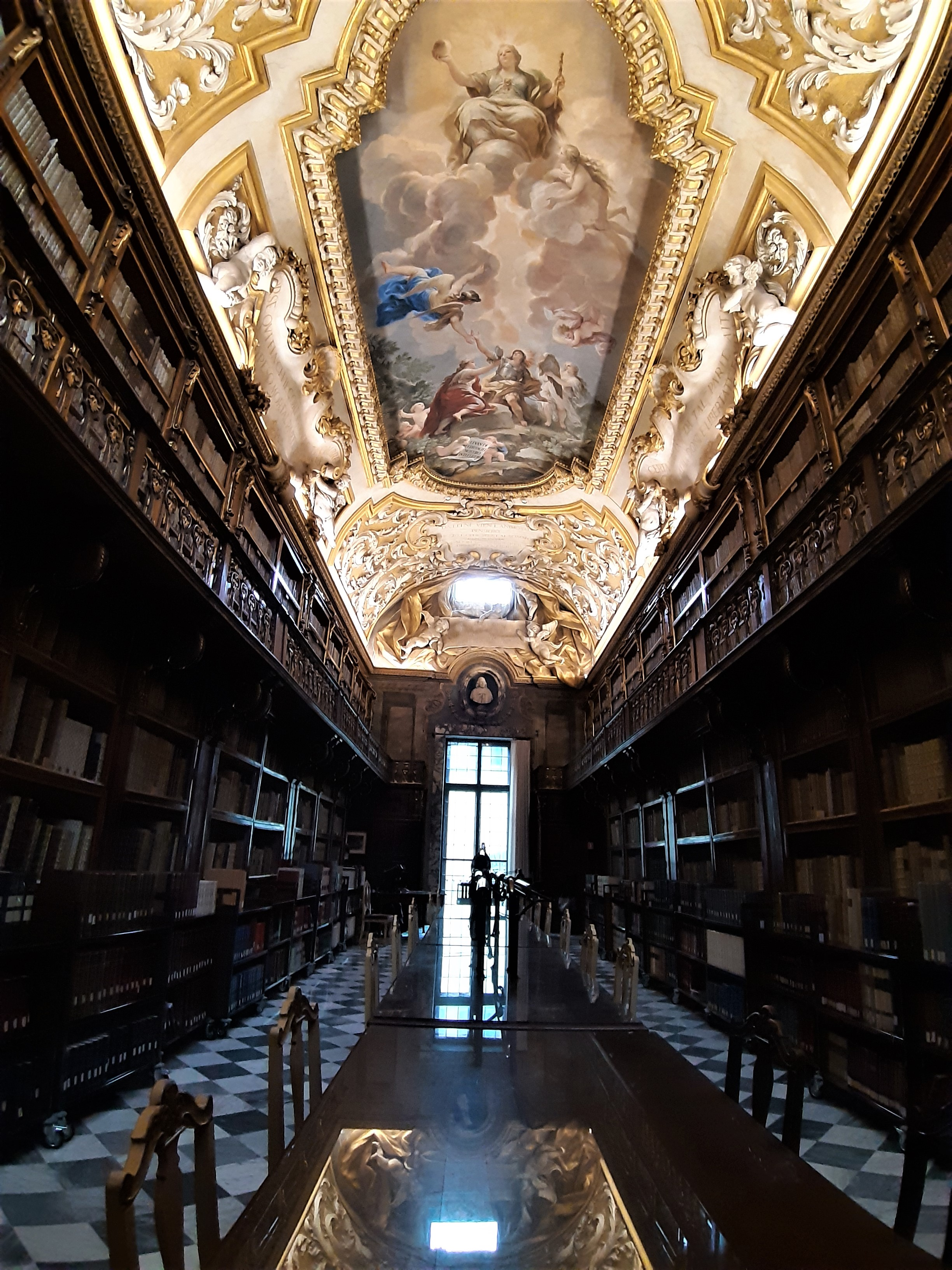
The Biblioteca Riccardiana reading room

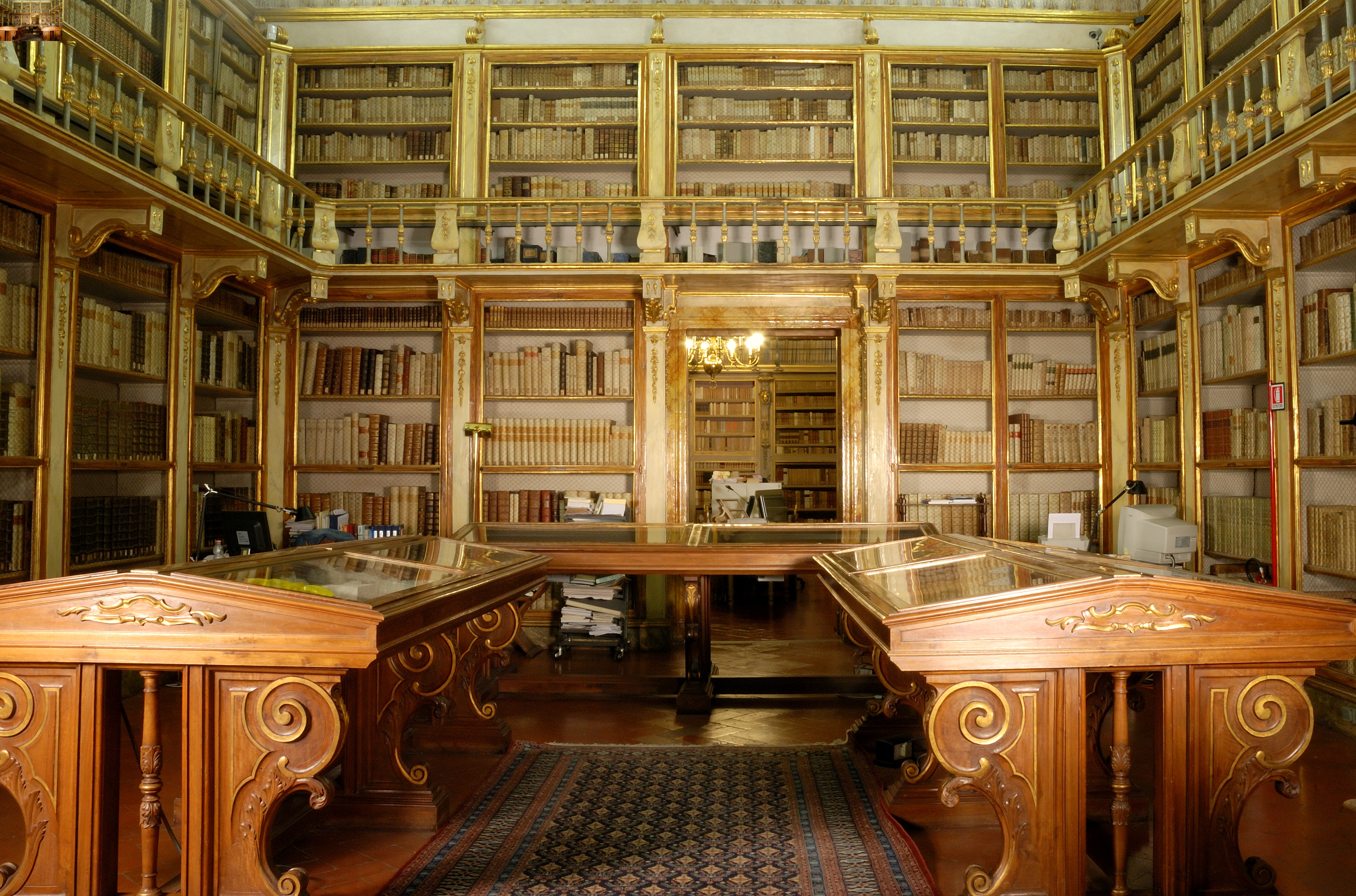
The Sala Esposizione.

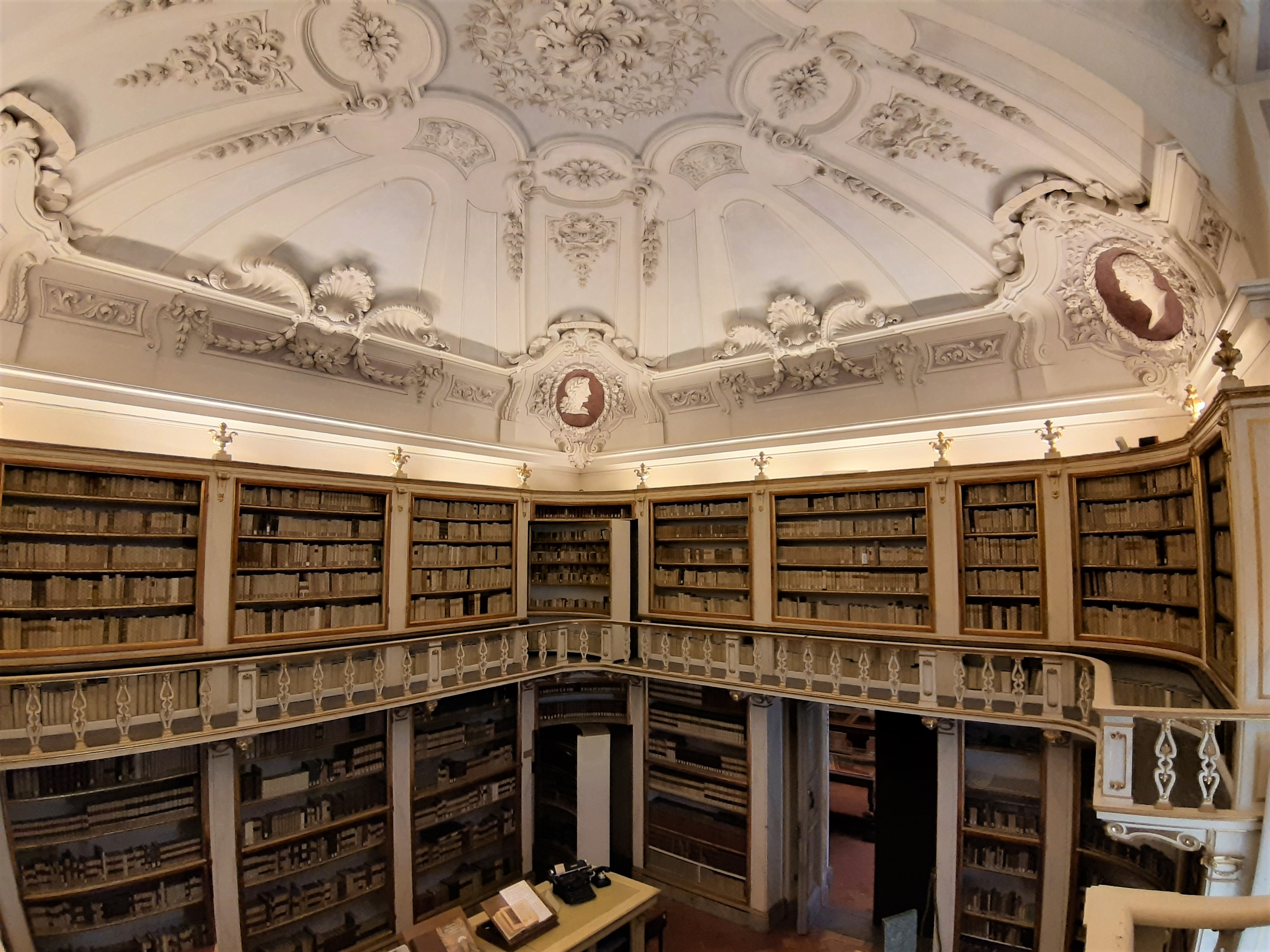
The director's office seen from the library's balcony.

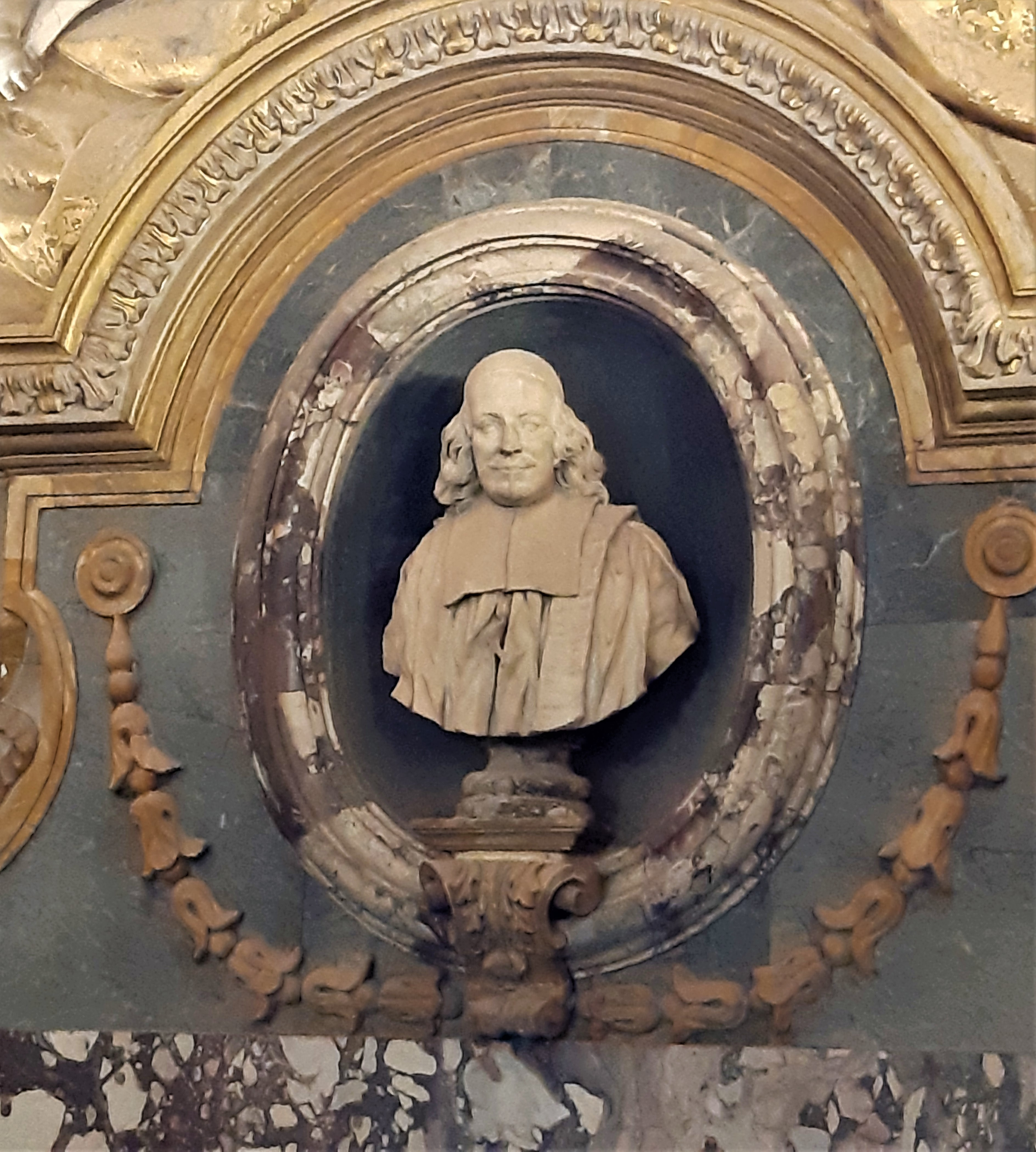
Giovan Battista Foggini, Bust of Vincenzio Capponi, Biblioteca Riccardiana reading room.

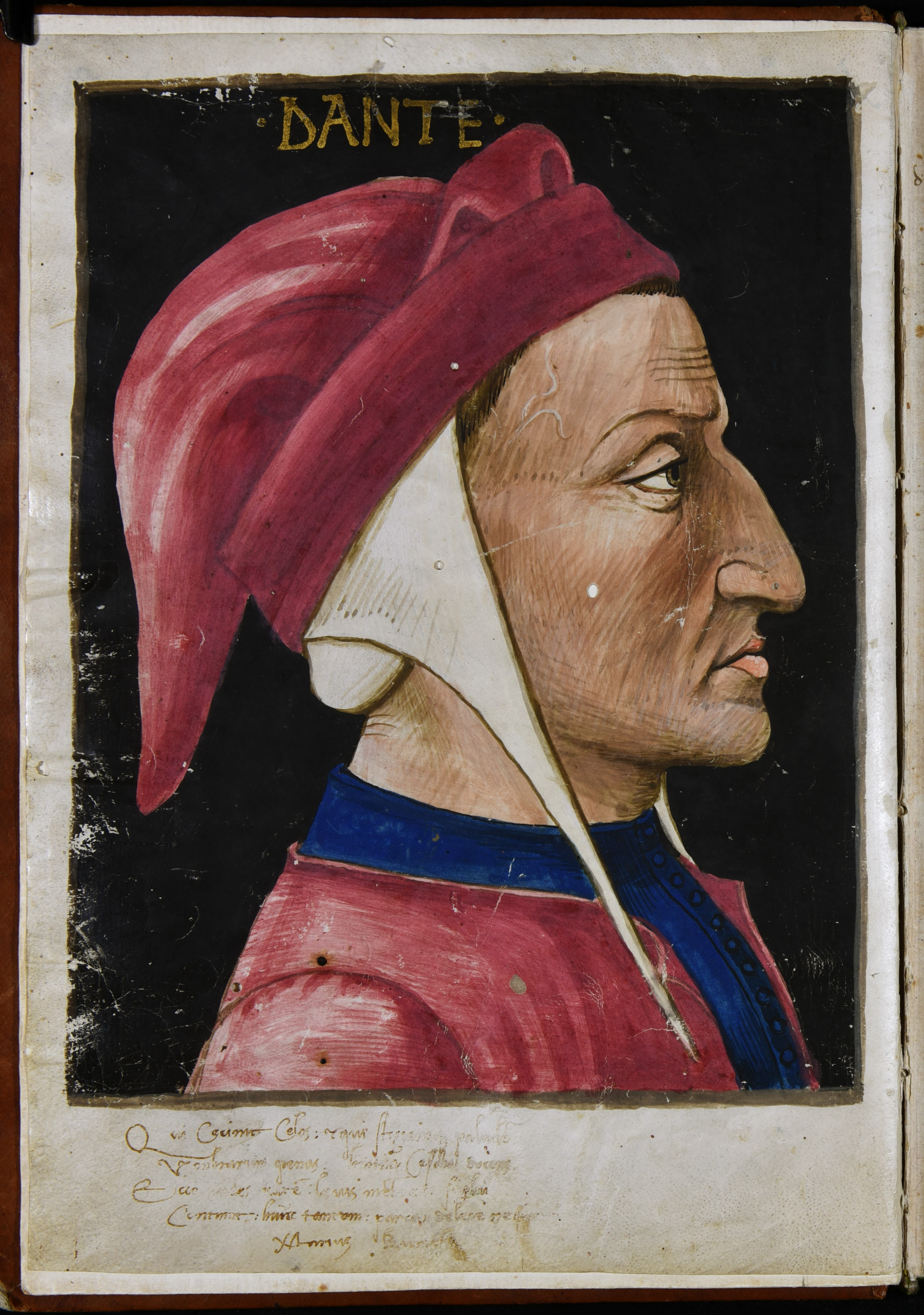
MS Ricc. 1040, f. 1v: Portrait of Dante.

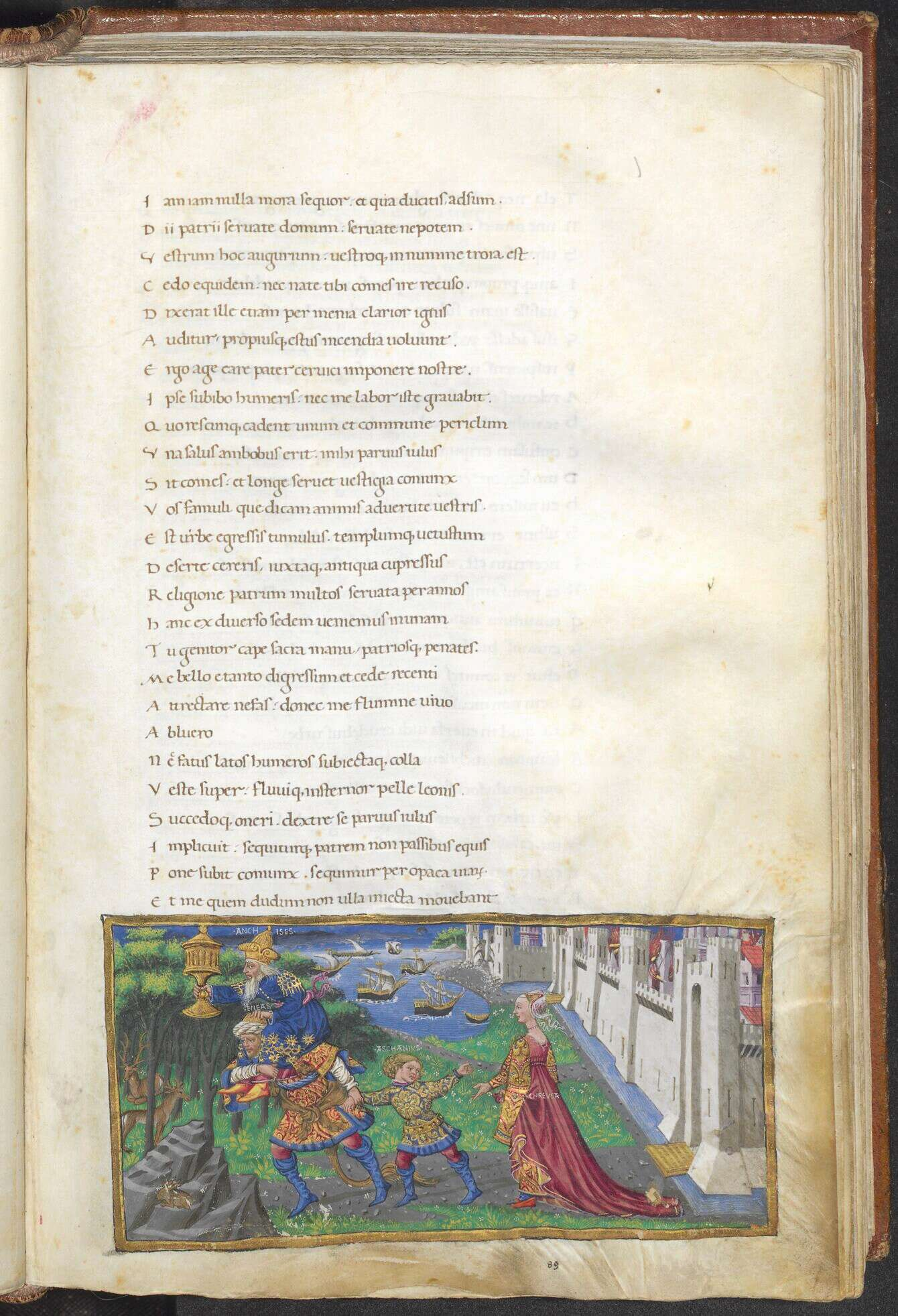
MS Ricc. 492, c. 89r (Virgilio Riccardiano).

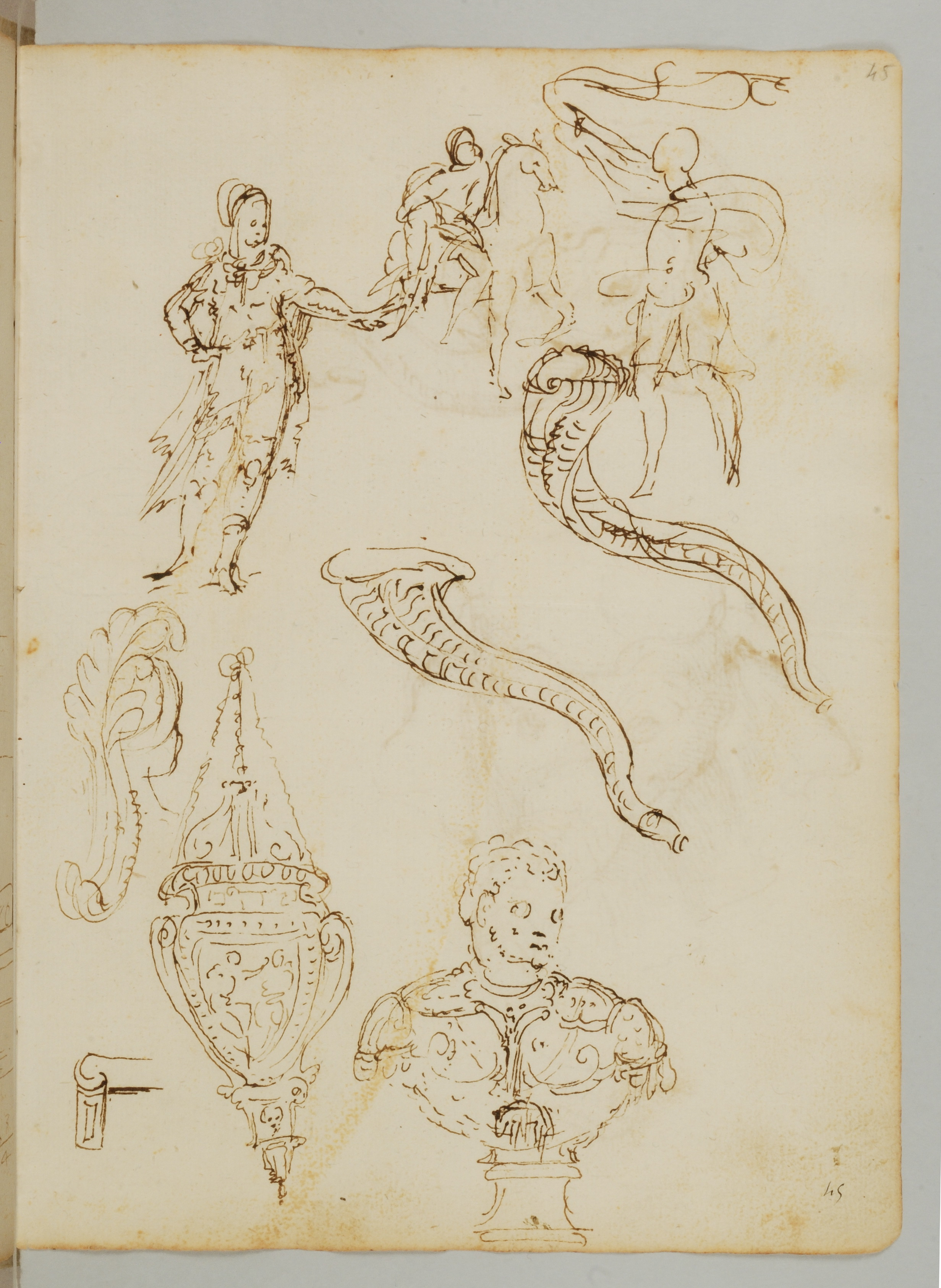
Ed. rare 120, f. 45r: Bartolomeo Ammannati's sketchbook (bust of Cosimo I de’ Medici wearing a classicizing armor).

== Bibliography ==
- C. Acidini Luchinat, I restauri nel Palazzo Medici Riccardi. Rinascimento e Barocco, Cinisello Balsamo, Silvana ed., 1992.
- N. Barbolani di Montauto, Pandolfo Reschi, Florence, 1996.
- G. Bartoletti, La Libraria privata del Marchese Suddecano Gabriello Riccardi. Il fondo manoscritti, Florence, Florence University Press, 2017.
- G. Biagi, Notizie storiche, bibliografiche e statistiche della Biblioteca Riccardiana di Firenze nel MDCCCXCVIII, Rome, 1900.
- La Biblioteca Riccardiana di Firenze. L’ambiente, le collezioni, i servizi, ed. G. Lazzi, Florence, Polistampa, 2009.
- Biblioteche Riccardiana e Moreniana in Palazzo Medici Riccardi, eds. G. Cipriani, G. Lazzi and V. Fraticelli, Fiesole, 1998.
- F. Büttner, “All’usanza moderna ridotto”: gli interventi dei Riccardi, in G. Cherubini – G. Fanelli eds., Il Palazzo Medici-Riccardi di Firenze, Florence, 1990, pp. 150–152.
- I Danti riccardiani: parole e figure, exhibition catalogue (Florence, Biblioteca Riccardiana, 26 November – 30 December 1988), eds. G. Lazzi – G. Savino, Florence, Polistampa, 1996.
- I disegni della Biblioteca Riccardiana di Firenze, exhibition catalogue, ed. M. Chairini, Florence, 1999.
- M. Gregori, Gli specchi dipinti della Galleria Riccardi, in "Paragone", XXIII, 1972, 267, pp. 74–82.
- Inventario e stima della Libreria Riccardi, available online in PDF format at riccardiana.firenze.sbn.it
- G. Lando Passerini, Il palazzo mediceo riccardiano e i suoi recenti restauri, Turin, Unione Tipografico Editrice, 1913.
- P. Malanima, I Riccardi di Firenze. Una famiglia e un patrimonio nella Toscana dei Medici, Florence, L.S.Olschki, 1977.
- R. Millen, Luca Giordano in Palazzo Riccardi, in "Paragone", 1974, 289, pp. 22–46.
- R. Millen, Luca Giordano in Palazzo Riccardi. 2. The Oil Sketches, Florence-München 1976, pp. 295–312.
- R. Millen, Palazzo Medici into Palazzo Riccardi: The Extension of a Facade along Via Larga, in "Mitteilungen des Kunsthistorisches Institues in Florenz", 31, 1987, 1, pp. 81–120.
- Miniatura viva: codici, facsimili, miniatori di oggi, exhibition catalogue (Florence, Biblioteca Riccardiana, 31 May – 26 July 2013), ed. G. Malafarina, Padua, 2013.
- M.J. Minicucci, Amor di libro e mondanità nel palazzo dei Riccardi, in Miscellanea di studi in onore di Anna Saitta Revignas, Florence, L.S.Olschki, 1978.
- M.J. Minicucci, Una biblioteca all’incanto: la Riccardiana, Florence, 1979.
- M.J. Minicucci, Il marchese Francesco Riccardi. Studi giovanili, esperienze di viaggio, attività diplomatica del fondatore della Biblioteca Riccardiana, Florence, L.S.Olschki, 1985.
- M.J. Minicucci, Per la storia della Biblioteca Riccardiana. Il bibliotecario Luigi Rigoli e un progetto inattuato, in Atti e memorie dell’Accademia toscana di scienze e lettere La Colombaria, 52, 1987, pp. 203–226.
- M.J. Minicucci, Un tesoro disperso: il museo riccardiano, in Atti del Terzo Congresso Internazionale degli Amici dei Musei (Florence, 6-11 giugno 1978), Florence, 1980, pp. 114–121.
- S. Morpurgo, I codici Riccardiani della Divina Commedia, Rome, 1893.
- Il Palazzo Medici-Riccardi di Firenze, eds. G. Cherubini – G. Fanelli, Florence, Giunti, 1990.
- M. Prunai Falciani, La Biblioteca Riccardiana, in Biblioteche d’Italia, Rome, 1991, pp. 93–103.
- M. Prunai Falciani, La Biblioteca Riccardiana da biblioteca di famiglia a biblioteca pubblica, in Beni librari, committenza e artisti nelle collezioni fiorentine, Florence, 1987, pp. 205–217.
- M. Prunai Falciani, Fatti e misfatti riccardiani. Un secolo e mezzo di restauri, in Accademie e biblioteche d’Italia, 56, 1988, 3, pp. 5–16.
- I Riccardi a Firenze e in villa. Tra fasto e cultura, exhibition catalogue, Florence, 1983.
- B. Santi, Palazzo Medici Riccardi, Florence, Becocci, [1983].
- Stanze segrete: gli artisti dei Riccardi. I ricordi di Luca Giordano e Oltre, exhibition catalogue (Florence, Palazzo Medici-Riccardi, 15 aprile - 17 luglio 2005), eds. C. Giannini and S. Meloni Trkulja, Florence, 2005.
