= Alev =

Alev [a:ˈlev] is a Turkish feminine given name (meaning flame). Notable people with the name include:

== Given name ==
- Alev Alatlı (1944–2024), Turkish economist, philosopher, columnist and bestselling novelist
- Alev Croutier (born 1945), Turkish writer based in San Francisco
- Alev Demirkesen (born 1964), Turkish artist
- Alev Erisir, Turkish-American academic in Psychology
- Alev Kelter (born 1991), American international rugby player
- Alev Korun (born 1977), Turkish-Austrian politician
- Alev Lenz (born 1982), German-Turkish singer/songwriter
- Alev Ebüzziya Siesbye (born 1938), Turkish-Danish ceramic artist
- Alev Tekinay (born 1951), Turkish writer

== Other ==
- Alev is also a type of settlement in Estonia (Urban-type settlement like), that is on a lower level than a town or city. The name means "borough". It is larger than an alevik (small borough). There are twelve alevs in Estonia.
