= Superbuick =

Studio album by Mushroomhead
- Released: September 13, 1996
- Recorded: 1996
- Studio: Mars Studio (Shalersville, Ohio)
- Genre: Alternative metal
- Length: 46:14
- Label: Shroom Co.
- Producer: Mushroomhead

Mushroomhead chronology
| Mushroomhead (1995) | Superbuick (1996) | M3 (1999) |

Singles from Superbuick
- 1. "These Filthy Hands" Released: 1996

Professional ratings
Review scores
| Source | Rating |
|---|---|
| AllMusic | 4/5 stars |

Superbuick is the second studio album by American heavy metal band Mushroomhead. It was released independently in 1996. Most of the songs were later remastered on XX which was initially released through Eclipse Records, then through Universal Records after some slight modifications and two additional songs. This is their first album with Jack Kilcoyne on bass and the last with Joe Lenkey on samples/programming. Previous bassist (and Kilcoyne's brother) Joe Kilcoyne has songwriting credits for a few tracks, as revealed when the songs were recorded and released again for XX.

The album was repressed in 2002 along with their self-titled album and M3, though some major retailers do not carry them. All three can be purchased at live shows.

To commemorate the album's 20th anniversary, a special one night only concert was held at the Agora Theatre on September 17, 2016, where the band played the album in its entirety. Digipack and vinyl pressings were also produced the same year to commemorate the album's anniversary.

== Samples ==
Superbuick uses these movie samples which have acknowledgments in the CD inlay:

- Twin Peaks: Fire Walk with Me
- Ed Wood
- Psych-Out
- Seven

== Track listing ==
| No. | Title | Length |
|---|---|---|
| 1. | "Bwomp" | 6:14 |
| 2. | "Never Let It Go" | 4:39 |
| 3. | "These Filthy Hands" | 5:19 |
| 4. | "The Wrist" | 5:16 |
| 5. | "Chancre Sore" | 2:35 |
| 6. | "Flattened" | 3:32 |
| 7. | "Big Brother" | 5:17 |
| 8. | "Idle Worship" | 5:13 |
| 9. | "Fear Held Dear" | 2:39 |
| 10. | "Unintended" (instrumental) | 1:41 |
| 11. | "Bwomp (Reprise)" | 3:49 |
| Total length: | | 46:14 |

== Personnel ==
Mushroomhead

- Jeffrey Hatrix – clean vocals
- Jason Popson – harsh vocals
- John Sekula – guitars
- Richie Moore – guitars
- Jack Kilcoyne – bass
- Tom Schmitz – keyboards
- Joe Lenkey – samples, programming
- Steve Felton – drums

Additional personnel

- The Heathers – backing vocals on "Big Brother"

Production

- Mushroomhead – production
- Bill Korecky – co-production, engineering
- Patrick Lewis – additional engineering
- Vanessa Solowiow – photography
- Rich Moore – layout and design
- R.M.G. – layout and design
