= Deianira Listens to Fame =

1638 painting by Peter Paul Rubens

- Deianira e la Fama (Italian)
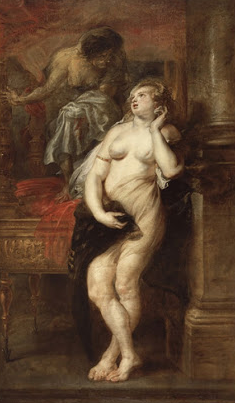
- Deianira Listens to Fame (1638) by Rubens
- Artist: Peter Paul Rubens
- Year: 1638
- Type: Oil on canvas
- Dimensions: 245 cm × 168 cm (96 in × 66 in)
- Location: Galleria Sabauda, Turin

Deianira Listens to Fame or Deianira delivering the fatal tunic to the Fury is a 1638 oil painting on canvas (245x168 cm) by Peter Paul Rubens. It is now in the Sabauda Gallery in Turin. It is a pendant to another Rubens painting, Hercules in the Garden of the Hesperides. It shows Hercules' wife Deianira and another woman holding a tunic soaked in the blood of Nessus, which Deianira believed would make Hercules to be forever true to her but instead killed him.

== Description ==
The painting shows Deianira, wife of Hercules, with a second female figure, and a tunic soaked in the blood of the centaur Nessus. Deianira believed the tunic would keep Hercules faithful to her, but instead it killed him.

The identity of the second figure has been debated. Older titles describe her as a Fury, while more recent scholarship has proposed that she is an allegorical figure of Fame (Fama), as the current title reflects.

== Pendant ==
The work is a pendant to Rubens's Hercules in the Garden of the Hesperides.
