= M3 (album) =

Studio album by Mushroomhead
- Released: March 9, 1999
- Studio: Mars Studio (Shalersville, Ohio)
- Genre: Alternative metal
- Length: 62:29
- Label: MRH
- Producer: Mushroomhead

Mushroomhead chronology
Superbuick (1996)	M3 (1999)	XIII (2003)

Professional ratings
Review scores
Source	Rating
AllMusic	3/5 stars

M3 is the third studio album by American heavy metal band Mushroomhead, released independently on March 9, 1999, by the band's own record label, MRH Inc. Records. It was the final studio album with John Sekula and Richie Moore as band members. The album, alongside Mushroomhead and Superbuick, was reissued with alternate artwork in 2002. The songs "Before I Die", "Solitaire / Unraveling", "The New Cult King", "Xeroxed" and "Born of Desire" were later included on both the Eclipse and Universal Records versions of XX in 2001.

== Musical style ==
Musically, M3 has been described as an alternative metal album, which incorporates elements of genres such as rap, punk, industrial, gothic rock, and techno.

== Track listing ==
All tracks are written by Mushroomhead.

No.	Title	Length
1.	"Before I Die"	3:13
2.	"Solitaire / Unraveling"	4:34
3.	"The New Cult King"	5:08
4.	"Inevitable"	5:03
5.	"Xeroxed"	2:56
6.	"The Final Act"	4:44
7.	"Conflict - The Argument Goes On…"	2:42
8.	"Exploiting Your Weakness"	4:21
9.	"Beauteous" (instrumental)	3:12
10.	"Born of Desire"	4:03
11.	"Dark and Evil Joe" (hidden track in earlier editions)	12:17
Total length:		62:29

Notes

- Tracks 10 and 11 are separated by ten minutes and sixteen seconds of silence.

== Personnel ==
Mushroomhead

- Jeffrey Hatrix – vocals
- Jason Popson – vocals
- John Sekula – guitars
- Richie Moore – guitars
- Jack Kilcoyne – bass
- Tom Schmitz – keyboards, samples
- Marko Vukcevich – samples, programming
- Steve Felton – drums

Additional musicians

- Scot Edgel – additional vocals on "The New Cult King" and "The Final Act"

Production

- Mushroomhead – production
- Bill Korecky – engineering
- Patrick Lewis – additional engineering
- Steve Felton – mastering
- Rich Moore/Rmg – artwork
