= A Breach of Silence =

Australian metalcore band

- Origin: Brisbane, Australia
- Genre: Metalcore
- Years active: 2010 – present
- Label: Eclipse Records
- Members: Mat Cosgrove; Blair Layt; Rhys Flannery; Kerrod Dabelstein; Daniel Trickett
- Past members: Corey Staples; Andrew Cotterell
- Website: www.abreachofsilence.com

A Breach of Silence is an Australian metalcore band from Brisbane, formed in 2010. They consist of Mat Cosgrove (guitar), Kerrod Dabelstein (guitar), Blair Layt (bass, vocals), Rhys Flannery (lead vocals), and Daniel Trickett (drums). Since formation they have released three albums and toured internationally.

== History ==
=== 2011-2013: Dead or Alive ===
The band's debut album Dead or Alive was released in Australia in July 2012, and was produced by Fredrik Nordström of Studio Fredman who has also produced bands such as Bring Me the Horizon, Arch Enemy, and In Flames.

In 2012 the band won Best Heavy Song at Q Music Award for the song "Dawn to Rise".

In mid-2013, vocalist Corey Staples was replaced by Rhys Flannery.

On 9 July 2013 the band was signed to U.S.A. record label Eclipse Records, who re-released Dead or Alive on 1 October 2013. In the same month, the band toured Australia with Adept.

=== 2014-2016: The Darkest Road ===
In December 2013, the band enlisted Fredrik Nordström and Henrik Udd of Studio Fredman to produce their sophomore album, The Darkest Road. It was released worldwide via Eclipse Records on 7 October 2014. The album debuted at #20 on the Australian Independent Record Labels Association 100% Independent Chart. On 8 August 2014 the band announced that Andrew "Stix" Cotterell would be departing the band.

=== 2017: Secrets ===
In February 2017, the band released their third studio album, Secrets.

== Band members ==
Current members

- Mat Cosgrove - guitars (2010–present)
- Kerrod Dabelstein - guitars (2010–present)
- Blair Layt - bass, clean vocals (2010–present)
- Rhys Flannery - unclean vocals (2012–present), clean vocals (2014–present)
- Michael Gee - drums (2014–present)

Former members

- Corey Staples - vocals (2010-2012)
- Andrew Corterell - drums (2010-2014)

== Discography ==
=== Studio albums ===
Title	Details
Dead or Alive	Released: July 2012; Label: A Breach of Silence; Format: CD, digital download
The Darkest Road	Released: October 2014; Label: Eclipse Records (ECLP 9037); Format: CD, digital download
Secrets	Released: February 2017; Label: Eclipse Records (ECLP 9070); Format: CD, digital download

== Awards ==
=== Queensland Music Awards ===
The Queensland Music Awards (previously known as Q Song Awards) are annual awards celebrating Queensland, Australia's brightest emerging artists and established legends. They commenced in 2006.

Year	Nominee / work	Award	Result (wins only)
2012	"Dawn to Rise"	Heavy Song of the Year	Won
