= Hercules in the Garden of the Hesperides =

1638 painting by Peter Paul Rubens

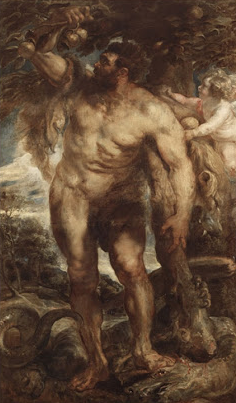
Hercules in the Garden of the Hesperides (1638) by Rubens

Hercules in the Garden of the Hesperides is a c. 1638 painting by Peter Paul Rubens. It measures 246 cm by 168.5 cm and is now in the Sabauda Gallery in Turin. It shows Hercules in the Garden of the Hesperides and forms part of a pair with the same artist's Deianira Listens to Fame.
