= Mushroomhead (album) =

Studio album by Mushroomhead
- Released: April 3, 1995
- Recorded: 1994–1995
- Genre: Alternative metal
- Length: 60:12
- Label: Self-released
- Producer: Bill Korecky; Steve Felton; Mushroomhead

Mushroomhead chronology
4 Demo Cassette (1994)	Mushroomhead (1995)	Superbuick (1996)

Mushroomhead
- Rerelease cover

Professional ratings
Review scores
Source	Rating
AllMusic	3/5 stars

Mushroomhead is the debut album from heavy metal band Mushroomhead. It was released independently in Cleveland, Ohio, United States in 1995. Some songs have been remastered on XX. Many of the songs contain samples from movies. This is the only album to feature the original line-up, as member Mr. Murdernickel would leave the band after the album's release, although he has songwriting credits on a few tracks on the next album. The album was re-pressed in 2002 through Filthy Hands along with Superbuick and M3 with alternate artwork, though some major retailers do not carry them.

By 2001, the album had sold over 47,000 copies, a considerable number for an album not available in most chain stores and retail markets.

== Track listing ==
All lyrics are written by Jeffrey Hatrix and Jason Popson.

No.	Title	Music	Length
1.	"Slow Thing"		3:45
2.	"Elevation"		3:33
3.	"Too Much Nothing"	John Sekula, Joe Kilcoyne, Tom Schmitz, Steve Felton	3:19
4.	"Intermission"		2:05
5.	"Ego Trip"		6:05
6.	"Mommy" (featuring Mandy Lascko)		5:08
7.	"2nd Thoughts"		3:44
8.	"Casualties in B Minor"		1:15
9.	"Indifferent"		4:46
10.	"Simpleton"		2:23
11.	"43"	Sekula, Schmitz, S. Felton	4:49
12.	"Episode 29" (Also known as "Untitled")	S. Felton, Dave Felton	3:36
13.	"Snap"		1:26
43.	"Untitled" (hidden track; also known as "Compilation")		12:00

Tracks 14 through 42 are silent and last four or five seconds each for a total length of 2:21. The untitled 12-minute hidden bonus track is a blend of clips of songs throughout the album, "Too Much Nothing," "Indifferent," "2nd Thoughts," "Mommy" and "43." They are separated by the intro featured in "Slow Thing" which is played in different pitches and manipulations.

== Film samples ==
The movie samples are cited in the CD booklet:

- Refer Madness [sic]
- Twin Peaks: Fire Walk with Me
- The Barretta Theme
- Hotel Room
- Reservoir Dogs
- Stand by Me
- Lean on Me
- Moscow on the Hudson
- The Silence of the Lambs
- Pet Sematary
- Closet Land
- Wayne's World
- One Flew Over the Coo-coo’s Nest [sic]
- The Texas Chainsaw Massacre

== Personnel ==
Mushroomhead

- Jeffrey Nothing – clean vocals
- J Mann – rapped and harsh vocals
- J. J. Righteous – guitars
- Richie "Dinner" Moore – guitars
- Joe "Mr. Murdernickel" Kilcoyne – bass
- Tom "Shmotz" Schmitz – keyboards, synthesiser, piano
- Joe "DJ Virus" Lenkey – samples, programming, turntables
- Skinny – drums, percussion, sampling, production

Additional performers

- Mandy Lascko – lead vocals on "Mommy"

Technical

- Bill Korecky – producer
- Steve Felton – producer
