= Alev Erisir =

Turkish-American neuroscientist

- Born: Kastamonu, Turkey
- Citizenship: Turkey, USA
- Occupation: Academic

Academic background
- Education: Istanbul University, Stony Brook University

Alev Erisir is a Turkish-American neuroscientist. She is a professor of psychology and the department chair at the University of Virginia in Charlottesville. Her primary research areas include synaptic connectivity in the visual and taste systems, neuronal circuit plasticity, and ultrastructural neuroanatomy.

== Early life and education ==
Erisir was born in Kastamonu, Turkey. Her father was stationed in Kastamonu as a malaria eradication doctor. As an infant, Erisir moved with her family to Çanakkale, Turkey, where she grew up until the age of 11. The family then moved to Istanbul, Turkey, where Erisir completed her secondary education. In 1986, following high school graduation, Erisir attended Istanbul University School of Medicine and received her MD. In 1996, Erisir graduated from the State University of New York at Stony Brook with a PhD in Behavioral Neuroscience.

== Research and career ==
Erisir completed postdoctoral training at New York University (NYU) Center for Neural Science. She completed her training under the guidance of Chiye Aoki. In Aoki's laboratory, Professor Erisir trained specifically in Electron Microscopy. After completing her training at NYU, Erisir completed a one-year postdoctoral appointment at New York Medical College (NYMC) in the department of Physiology. Following her time at NYMC, Erisir returned to NYU this time as a Research Assistant Professor.

In 2000, Erisir started working at University of Virginia (UVA) as an assistant professor. In 2013, she was granted professor status at UVA. During her time at UVA, Erisir has served in several administrative roles, including co-director of the neuroscience graduate program, director of the cognitive science program, and director of the neuroscience undergraduate program. In 2016, she was appointed to be the chair of the psychology department at UVA.

At UVA, Erisir's research has consisted of investigating ocular dominance column plasticity using several different techniques, brain stem gustatory circuitry, the aging brain and its pathology, and three-dimensional connectomics.

Erisir conducts studies on cellular mechanisms within the aging brain and neurodegenerative diseases such as Alzheimer's disease. Her work examines the relationship between hyperactive oligodendrocytes and cognitive impairments in Alzheimer's mouse models. Additionally, Erisir's research examines proteins such as beta-amyloid and tau that result in the loss of synaptic plasticity.

In 2008, Erisir received a University of Virginia Mead Grant, which funded an opportunity for Erisir to take undergraduates to the annual Society of Neuroscience conference. In 2010, she mentored a research project that investigated rodent neural circuitry between the brainstem and the oral cavity. This project was selected by the University of Virginia to receive the "Double Hoo" Grant.

== Selected publications ==
- Campbell, Charles; Lindhartsen, Sarah; Knyaz, Adam; Erisir, Alev; Nahmani, Marc (October 15, 2020). "Cortical Presynaptic Boutons Progressively Engulf Spinules as They Mature". eNeuro. 7 (5). doi:10.1523/ENEURO.0426-19.2020. ISSN 2373-2822. PMC 7568603. PMID 32958478.
- Sanchez, Victoria; Bakhti-Suroosh, Anousheh; Chen, Andrew; Brunzell, Darlene H.; Erisir, Alev; Lynch, Wendy J. (19 March 2019). "Exercise during abstinence normalizes ultrastructural synaptic plasticity associated with nicotine-seeking following extended access self-administration". European Journal of Neuroscience. 50 (4): 2707–2721. doi:10.1111/ejn.14408. ISSN 0953-816X. PMC 6742551. PMID 30888721.
- Wang, L; Kloc, M; Maher, E; Erisir, A; Maffei, A (2019-03-01). "Presynaptic GABAA Receptors Modulate Thalamocortical Inputs in Layer 4 of Rat V1". Cerebral Cortex. 29 (3): 921–936. doi:10.1093/cercor/bhx364. ISSN 1047-3211. PMID 29373653.
- Schecter, Rachel W.; Maher, Erin E.; Welsh, Christina A.; Stevens, Beth; Erisir, Alev; Bear, Mark F. (2017-11-01). "Experience-Dependent Synaptic Plasticity in V1 Occurs without Microglial CX3CR1". The Journal of Neuroscience. 37 (44): 10541–10553. doi:10.1523/JNEUROSCI.2679-16.2017. ISSN 1529-2401. PMC 5666579. PMID 28951447.
- Irwin, Jacob A.; Erisir, Alev; Kwon, Inchan (2016). "Oral Triphenylmethane Food Dye Analog, Brilliant Blue G, Prevents Neuronal Loss in APPSwDI/NOS2-/- Mouse Model". Current Alzheimer Research. 13 (6): 663–677. doi:10.2174/15672050136661602081424568 (inactive 11 July 2025). ISSN 1875-5828. PMC 5441128. PMID 26852943.
- Holtz, Stephen L.; Fu, Anqi; Loflin, Wyatt; Corson, James A.; Erisir, Alev (2015-01-01). "Morphology and connectivity of parabrachial and cortical inputs to gustatory thalamus in rats". The Journal of Comparative Neurology. 523 (1): 139–161. doi:10.1002/cne.23673. ISSN 1096-9861. PMC 4232453. PMID 25186035.
- Corson, James A.; Erisir, Alev (2013-09-01). "Monosynaptic convergence of chorda tympani and glossopharyngeal afferents onto ascending relay neurons in the nucleus of the solitary tract: a high-resolution confocal and correlative electron microscopy approach". The Journal of Comparative Neurology. 521 (13): 2907–2926. doi:10.1002/cne.23357. ISSN 1096-9861. PMC 3953562. PMID 23640852.
- Owe, S. G.; Erisir, A.; Heggelund, P. (2013-07-23). "Terminals of the major thalamic input to visual cortex are devoid of synapsin proteins". Neuroscience. 243: 115–125. doi:10.1016/j.neuroscience.2013.03.031. ISSN 1873-7544. PMC 3953556. PMID 23535254.
- Wang, Siting; Corson, James; Hill, David; Erisir, Alev (2012-10-01). "Postnatal development of chorda tympani axons in the rat nucleus of the solitary tract". The Journal of Comparative Neurology. 520 (14): 3217–3235. doi:10.1002/cne.23093. PMC 3418376. PMID 22430892.
- Corson, James; Aldridge, Alexandra; Wilmoth, Kristin; Erisir, Alev (2012-02-15). "A survey of oral cavity afferents to the rat nucleus tractus solitarii". The Journal of Comparative Neurology. 520 (3): 495–527. doi:10.1002/cne.22715. PMC 3371193. PMID 21800298.
- Corson, J.; Nahmani, M.; Lubarsky, K.; Badr, N.; Wright, C.; Erisir, A. (2009-10-20). "Sensory activity differentially modulates N-methyl-d-aspartate receptor subunits 2A and 2B in cortical layers". Neuroscience. 163 (3): 920–932. doi:10.1016/j.neuroscience.2009.07.016. ISSN 0306-4522. PMC 2746878. PMID 19596055.
- Kielland, Anders; Erisir, Alev; Walaas, S. Ivar; Heggelund, Paul (2006-05-24). "Synapsin Utilization Differs among Functional Classes of Synapses on Thalamocortical Cells". Journal of Neuroscience. 26 (21): 5786–5793. doi:10.1523/JNEUROSCI.4631-05.2006. PMC 6675263. PMID 16723536. S2CID 6367573.
- Lillard, Angeline S.; Erisir, Alev (2011-12-01). "Old dogs learning new tricks: Neuroplasticity beyond the juvenile period". Developmental Review. 31 (4): 207–239. doi:10.1016/j.dr.2011.07.008. ISSN 0273-2297. PMC 3956134. PMID 24648605.
- Coleman, Jason E.; Nahmani, Marc; Gavornik, Jeffrey P.; Haslinger, Robert; Heynen, Arnold J.; Erisir, Alev; Bear, Mark F. (2010-07-21). "Rapid Structural Remodeling of Thalamocortical Synapses Parallels Experience-Dependent Functional Plasticity in Mouse Primary Visual Cortex". Journal of Neuroscience. 30 (29): 9670–9682. doi:10.1523/JNEUROSCI.1248-10.2010. PMC 3065324. PMID 20660250. S2CID 54556439.
- May, Olivia L.; Erisir, Alev; Hill, David L. (2007). "Ultrastructure of primary afferent terminals and synapses in the rat nucleus of the solitary tract: Comparison among the greater superficial petrosal, chorda tympani, and glossopharyngeal nerves". Journal of Comparative Neurology. 502 (6): 1066–1078. doi:10.1002/cne.21371. ISSN 1096-9861. PMC 2798003. PMID 17444498.
