= Eclipse Records =

American independent record label

- Founded: 1997
- Founder: Chris Poland
- Distributors: The Orchard (digital); MVD Entertainment (physical)
- Genre: Heavy metal, hard rock
- Country of origin: U.S.
- Location: Pompton Plains, New Jersey
- Official website: www.eclipserecords.com

Eclipse Records is an American independent record label based in Butler, New Jersey. The label is best known for bringing the Cleveland band Mushroomhead to national attention. The president of the label is Chris Poland, not to be confused with the former guitarist of Megadeth who happens to have the same name.

== History ==
Eclipse Records was founded in 1997 by owner Chris Poland.

Eclipse Records releases few albums compared to other labels their size. President Chris Poland states that he believes that a record company should try to work on making each album "hit material", instead of putting out as many albums as possible to gain recognition. The label has also focused efforts on using new technology such as digital distribution to increase its bands' exposure in a competitive music market. In September 2017, Eclipse Records signed Genus Ordinis Dei, a symphonic death metal band from Crema, Italy to their roster.

== Roster ==
The following artists have albums released with Eclipse Records.

== Current ==
- Nova Riot
- A Breach of Silence
- Benthos
- Blacklist 9
- Blowsight
- Cold Snap
- Despite
- Mindshift
- Naberus
- Our Last Enemy
- Outshine
- Saint Diablo
- Shape Of Water
- Sixty Miles Ahead
- Sifting
- Tomorrow Is Lost
- Violet Blend
- State of Deceit

=== Past ===
- Alev
- Bobaflex
- Cipher
- Dead By Wednesday
- Dirt Church
- Disarray (band)
- Five Foot Thick
- Megaherz
- Mushroomhead
- Run for Cover
- Scum of the Earth, led by the former Rob Zombie guitarist "Riggs"
