= Jeff Siegel =

American financial writer

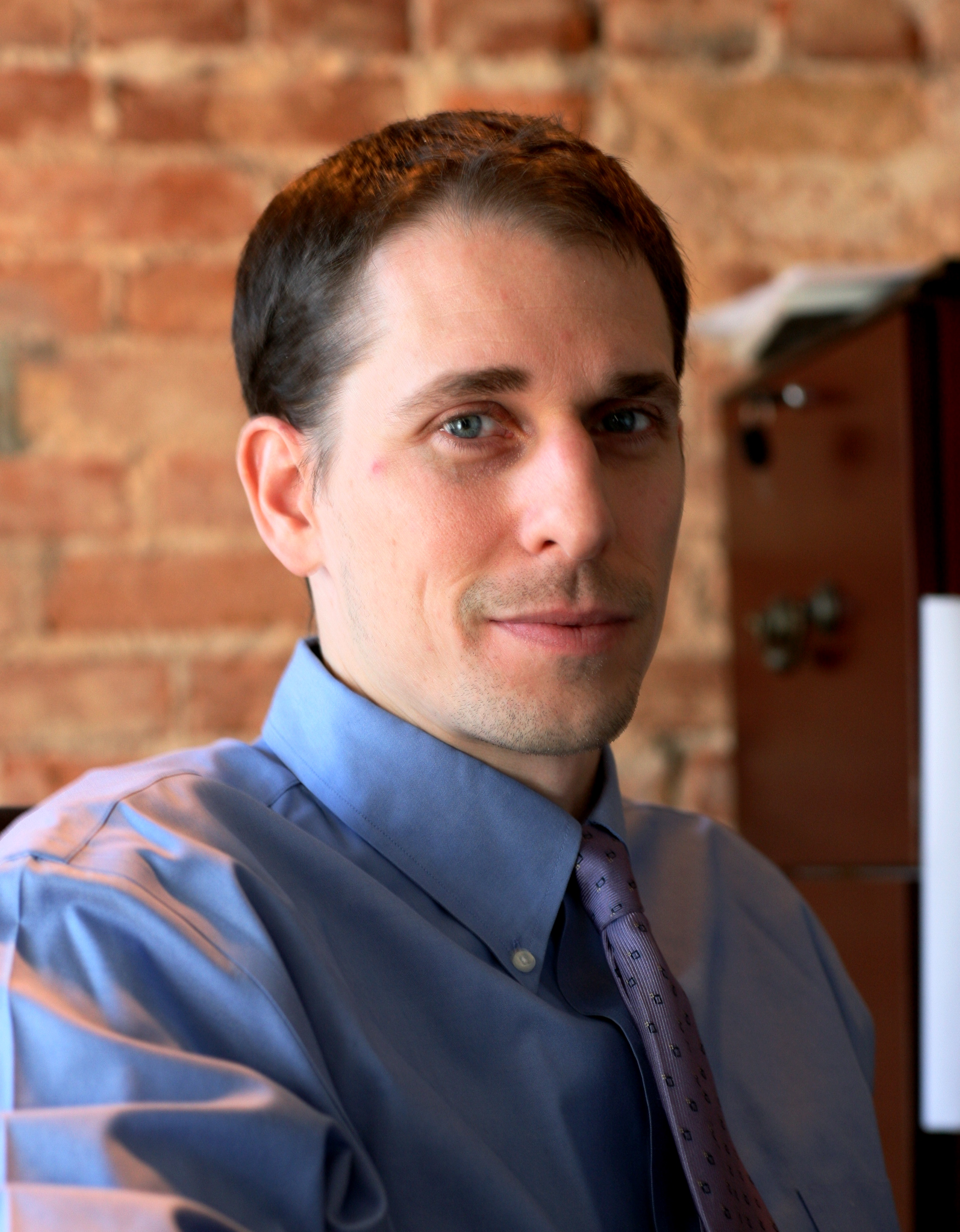
- Siegel in 2007
- Born: 1970 (age 55–56)
- Education: York College of Pennsylvania
- Occupation: Financial writer
- Writing career
- Language: English
- Notable work: Investing in Renewable Energy: Making Money on Green Chip Stocks
- Musical career
- Genres: Experimental rock, metal
- Instrument: Keyboards
- Formerly of: Dog Fashion Disco, The Alter Boys

Jeff Siegel is an American financial writer, publisher and musician. He is the author of the bestseller Investing in Renewable Energy: Making Money on Green Chip Stocks along with Nick Hodge and Chris Nelder. He founded and runs the private investment community, Green Chip Stocks, and is credited with coining the phrase "Green Chip Stocks".

== Biography ==
Siegel is from Baltimore, Maryland, and attended York College of Pennsylvania, where he was a regular commentator for WVYC and a founding member of the Pennsylvania Rho chapter of Phi Kappa Psi.

=== Financial writing ===
Siegel has made appearances on shows like CNBC Asia's Capital Connection, Forbes on Fox, Neil Cavuto, the Willis Report, and Squawk Box. Siegel is most notable for his expertise in the fields of renewable energy and cannabis and psychedelics investing. He is a partner in the JLS Fund, which is a fund focused on psychedelics and plant-based medicine.

=== Music and other work ===
Siegel was an early member of the experimental metal band Dog Fashion Disco and a founding member of The Alter Boys, playing keyboards. He has worked on scoring several films, including Exorcist: The Beginning. He also appeared on MTV Europe, in the 2008 documentaries Working Class Rock Star, DFDVD, DFDVD II, The City Is Alive Tonight and was featured on Farmclub.com. Siegel performed at the Jagermeister Music Tour and the Warped Tour, and was interviewed for Kerrang!. He also lent his voice to The Warriors video game, published by Rockstar Games.

=== Books ===
- Investing in Renewable Energy: Making Money on Green Chip Stocks. John Wiley & Sons. 2007. ISBN 0-470-15268-0.
- Energy Investing for Dummies. John Wiley & Sons. 2013. ISBN 1-118-11641-0.
