= We Reach: The Music of the Melvins =

Compilation album by various artists
- Released: August 23, 2005
- Length: 65:23
- Label: Fractured Transmitter (FTRC004)

We Reach: The Music of the Melvins is a tribute album to the American rock band Melvins, contributed to by a variety of artists. The compilation was released on CD by Fractured Transmitter Recording Company on August 23, 2005.

== Track listing ==
No.	Title	Artist(s)	Length
1.	"Night Goat"	Mare	3:00
2.	"Honey Bucket"	The Dillinger Escape Plan	2:42
3.	"The Bit"	Mastodon	4:29
4.	"Zodiac"	Strapping Young Lad	3:59
5.	"Claude"	Pig Destroyer	1:15
6.	"Oven"	High on Fire / Keelhaul	1:27
7.	"Shevil"	Meatjack	6:15
8.	"Joan of Arc"	Strapadon Factory (Devin Townsend, Burton C. Bell, Brann Dailor)	3:21
9.	"Boris"	Isis / Agoraphobic Nosebleed	9:01
10.	"Revolve"	Pitch Black Forecast	4:30
11.	"Easy as It Was"	Eyehategod	3:11
12.	"Anaconda"	Dog Fashion Disco	4:30
13.	"Raise a Paw"	Disengage	1:15
14.	"Hog Leg"	Blessing the Hogs	5:22
15.	"Laughing with Lucifer at Satan's Sideshow"	CKY / Gnarkill	2:40
16.	"Copache"	Maritime Murder	2:48
17.	"Bar X the Rocking M"	Made Out of Babies	2:47
18.	"Echohead/Don't Piece Me"	Pincer 2	2:51

== Reception ==
Professional ratings
Review scores
Source	Rating
AllMusic	3/5 stars

Alex Henderson of AllMusic gave the tribute album three stars out of five, calling it "slightly uneven". He said that "most of the time, the artists try things that work" and "while We Reach probably won't appeal to those with only a casual interest in the Melvins, it is a lot of fun if one is a hardcore fan of their innovative sludge."

In a review for mxdwn.com, Steve Mangione said: "We Reach: The Music of the Melvins is an amazingly odd assortment of bands taking on over 20 years of material from [Melvins] and incontrovertibly making it work." Speaking on the artists involved, he stated "there’s a number of unknowns on this compilation that certainly hold their own among such big names ... Melvins fans will surely enjoy watching these rising stars of metal pay rightful homage."
