= DFDVD II =

Video by Dog Fashion Disco
- Released: October 28, 2008
- Recorded: 1995–2007
- Length: 3:16:00
- Label: Rotten Records

Dog Fashion Disco chronology
DFD-Day (2005)	DFDVD II (2008)

DFDVD II is the third (including DFD-Day) DVD release by Baltimore avant-garde metal band Dog Fashion Disco, and the sequel to the original DFDVD from 2005. The DVD mostly carries on where the DFD-Day DVD left off, consisting mostly of footage from after the band's deal with Artemis Records, but does include earlier extras.

== Track listing ==
"Farewell in Baltimore" (Live at Sonar, January 13, 2007)

1. "Love Song for a Witch"
2. "Baby Satan"
3. "Rapist Eyes"
4. "Deja Vu"
5. "The Satanic Cowboy"
6. "9 to 5 at the Morgue"
7. "The Acid Memoirs"
8. "100 Suicides"
9. "Castaway"
10. "Darkest Days"
11. "Valley Girl Ventriloquist"
12. "Desert Grave"
13. "Pogo the Clown"
14. "Worm in a Dog's Heart"
15. "The Sacrifice of Miss Rose Covington"
16. "Corpse Is a Corpse"
17. "Rat on a Sinking Ship"
18. "God Crisis"
19. "Magical Band of Fools"
20. "Vertigo Motel"
21. "Pink Riots"
22. "Siamese Fever"
23. "Dr. Piranha"
24. "Albino Rhino"
  "From Artemis to Adultery" (Adultery CD Release Party)
25. "100 Suicides"
26. "The Satanic Cowboy"
27. "Worm in a Dog's Heart"
28. "Moonlight City Drive"
29. "Desert Grave"
30. "Pogo the Clown"
31. "The Acid Memoirs"
32. "Silent Film"
  Additional features
33. "Silent Film"
34. First Dog Fashion Disco Show
35. Photo Gallery

In addition, the DVD also contains documentaries and interviews.

== Credits ==
- Todd Smith - Vocals
- Jasan Stepp - Guitar
- Jeff Siegel - Keyboards
- Brian "Wendy" White - Bass
- John Ensminger - drums
- Derek Brewer - Management
- Jeff Cohen, Esq. - Legal
- Rotten Records - label
- Unstable Ground - DVD production company
- Justin McConnell - DVD author/director/camera
- Tom Gregg - cameraman
- Greg Sommer - cameraman
- Trevor Juenger - cameraman
- Echo Gardiner - photographer
- Carlos Batts - director (music video - Silent Film)
