= Blowing Smoke =

Blowing Smoke may refer to:

- Smoke ring

== Film and TV ==
- "Blowing Smoke" (Mad Men)
- Freak Talks About Sex, released for home video as Blowin' Smoke, 1999 film starring Steve Zahn
- Blowing Smoke, a 2004 TV film directed by James Orr

== Music ==
=== Albums ===
- Blowin' Smoke, Smokey Wilson album 2003

=== Songs ===
- "Blowin' Smoke", song recorded by Kacey Musgraves
- "Blowin' Smoke", song by Peter Frampton from Fingerprints (Peter Frampton album) 2006
- "Blowin' Smoke", song by Soundgarden and Matt Cameron 2010
- "Blowin' Smoke", song by Pete Nice and DJ Richie Rich from Dust to Dust (Pete Nice and DJ Richie Rich album)
- "Blowin' Smoke", song by David Ball from Thinkin' Problem
- "Blowin' Smoke", song by Nashville Pussy from Let Them Eat Pussy
- "Blowin' Smoke", song by Venomin James
- "Blowing Smoke", song by Gracie Abrams from The Secret of Us
- "Blowing Smoke", song by Lil' Flip from Roofback 2006
- "Blowing Smoke", song by rock band The Swirling Eddies from Outdoor Elvis; covered on When Worlds Collide: A Tribute to Daniel Amos
