= Axioma =

American band

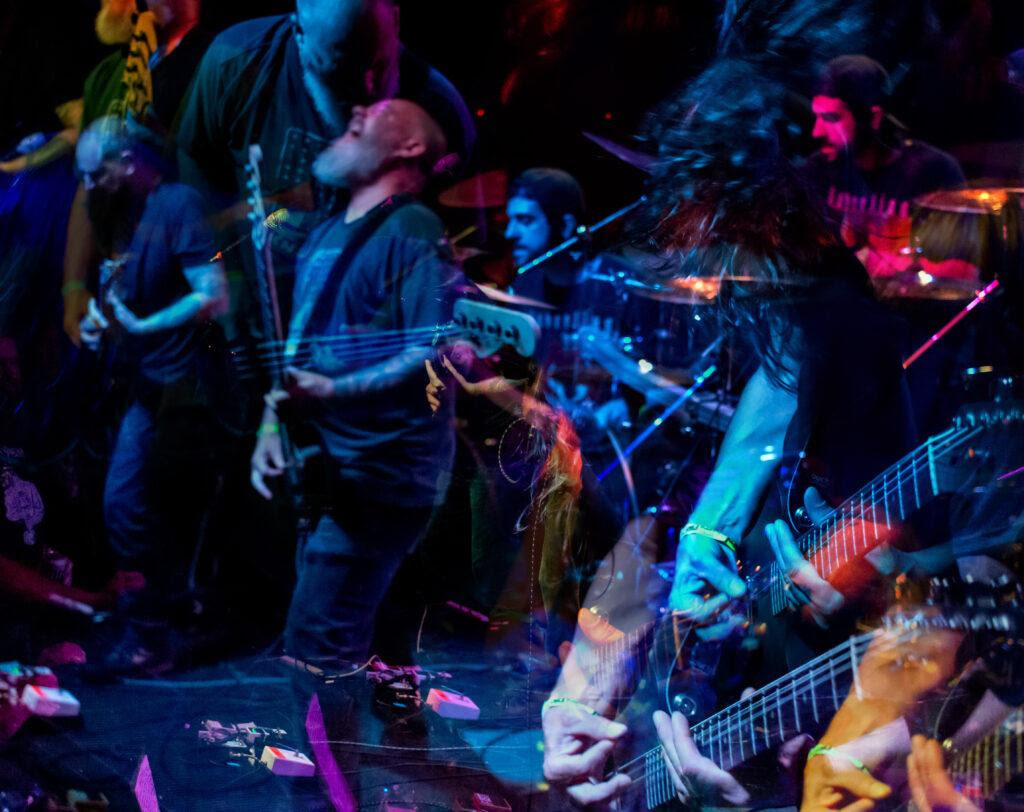
- Axioma performing in 2024

Background information
- Origin: Cleveland, Ohio, United States
- Genres: Dark Metal, Post-black Metal, Post-metal, Sludge Metal, Doom Metal
- Years active: 2015–present
- Labels: Tartarus Records, Translation Loss Records, Stained Glass Torments
- Members: Aaron Dallison; J Meyers; Nick Amato; Cyril Blandino
- Past members: Jon Vinson

Axioma (/ˌæksiˈoʊmə/; pronounced AK-see-oh-mə) from the root word Axiom is an American dark metal band from Cleveland, Ohio, formed in 2015. The band is known for combining Death Metal, post-black metal, sludge, doom, and ambient music. They have released multiple critically hailed EPs and full-length albums, garnering attention in underground metal circles for their apocalyptic soundscapes and visceral performances.

== History ==
The band dates back to 2015 when guitarists Cyril Blandino and J. Meyers from Forged in Flame, former Keelhaul and Ringworm bassist/vocalist Aaron Dallison, and drummer Jon Vinson came together in Cleveland, Ohio. Their debut EP, Opia, was released in 2016 by Tartarus Records based in Groningen, Netherlands.

In 2019, the band released their first full-length album, Crown, through Translation Loss Records (in German). The album featured a cover of the 1998 Massive Attack song Angel.

Their second full-length album, Sepsis, followed in 2022 again on Translation Loss Records with multiple vinyl pressings. In 2023, Axioma released the EP Primal Descent through Stained Glass Torments. The album was the first to feature drummer Nick Amato. Written during the COVID-19 pandemic, the EP explores themes of technological and societal decay.

In 2024, they produced and released Live Totality, a live EP inspired by their performance on the edge of Lake Erie during the total solar eclipse in Lorain, Ohio.

== Musical style ==
Axioma's sound incorporates elements of black metal, doom, sludge, and ambient music. The band is often compared to acts like Neurosis and Inter Arma for their aggressive yet atmospheric approach.

== Members ==
=== Current ===
- Cyril Blandino – guitar
- J. Meyers – guitar
- Aaron Dallison – bass, vocals
- Nick Amato – drums (2022–present)

=== Former ===
- Jon Vinson – drums (2015–2022)

== Discography ==
=== Studio albums ===
- Crown (2019, Translation Loss Records)
- Sepsis (2022, Translation Loss Records)

=== EPs ===
- Opia (2016, Tartarus Records)
- Primal Descent (2023, Stained Glass Torments)
- Live Totality (2024, Stained Glass Torments)

=== Singles ===
- "Sacred Killing Machine" (2019)
- "Cult of Moloch" (2019)
- "A New Dark Age" (2022)
- "Septic" (2022)

== Live performances ==
Axioma has performed across the U.S. alongside bands such as Goatwhore, Conan, Integrity, Dragged into Sunlight, Gorguts, Immolation, Osi and the Jupiter, and Imperial Triumphant. They also participated in Into the Darkness Festival and held a live in sync solar eclipse performance in 2024.

== Related projects ==
- Brain Tentacles - Jazz Metal trio featuring Aaron Dallison, Dave Witte and Bruce Lamont of Yakuza. Releases on Relapse Records
- Dark Worship (US) - Noise Music and Dark Ambient project with members of Axioma. Releases on Tarturus Records.
