= Drake equation (disambiguation) =

The Drake equation is an equation used to estimate the number of active, communicative extraterrestrial civilizations in the Milky Way galaxy.

Drake equation may also refer to:

- Drake Equation (album), a 2001 album by the American band Tub Ring
- "Drake Equation", a song by Tony Rohrbough, lead guitarist for Byzantium, from his solo album The Work
