= Fermi Paradox (album) =

Studio album by Tub Ring
- Released: October 15, 2002
- Recorded: 2002
- Genre: Various
- Length: 40:04
- Label: Underground Inc.

Tub Ring chronology
Drake Equation (2001)	Fermi Paradox (2002)	Zoo Hypothesis (2004)

Professional ratings
Review scores
Source	Rating
Allmusic	4/5 stars

Fermi Paradox is the 2002 (see 2002 in music) album by the band Tub Ring named after Enrico Fermi's Fermi Paradox.

== Track listing ==
All tracks by Tub Ring

1. "I Am the Robot" – 1:09
2. "Invalid" – 3:53
3. "Future Was Free" – 3:20
4. "Psychology is B.S. (Not Science)" – 3:08
5. "At the Seams" – 2:20
6. "Living with Rene's Head" – 4:21
7. "Fruit of Knowledge" – 3:27
8. "Hands" – 0:54
9. "Negative One" – 3:25
10. "Fall Back" – 2:35
11. "Panic the Digital" – 2:34
12. "The Subsequent Rating Given to the Life and Times of Jack Valenti" – 3:16
13. "The Way to Mars" – 5:35

== Personnel ==
- Todd Cooper - percussion
- Steve Fallone - mastering
- Jason Fields - bass
- Dave Tavares - drums
- Kevin Gibson - vocals
- Rob Kleiner - keyboards
- Paul Long - assistant engineer
- Doug McBride - producer, engineer, mixing
- Joshua "Cartier" Cutsinger - producer, engineer
- Rob Ross - voices
- Rahul Sharma - sitar
- Shawn Sprinkel - guitar
- Dave Winer - trumpet
- Rachel Crichton - extra vocals
- Callie Coombs - extra vocals
- Anthony Soleau - marimba
