= The Great Filter (album) =

Studio album by Tub Ring
- Released: May 1, 2007
- Recorded: December 2006 – February 2007; At B-Side Audio Studios in Chicago, IL.
- Genre: Experimental rock
- Length: 43:30
- Label: The End Records
- Producer: Rob Kleiner; Neal Ostrovsky

Tub Ring chronology
Zoo Hypothesis (2004)	The Great Filter (2007)	Secret Handshakes (2010)

Professional ratings
Review scores
Source	Rating
Allmusic	3.5/5 stars

The Great Filter is the title of Chicago band Tub Ring's 2007 release, and their debut on The End Records. The CD was released on May 1, 2007, with advance copies available at the release party (along with a unique Tub Ring/3-2-1 Activate! split CD, called Alter Egos) on April 27, 2007. The album keeps up the tradition of the past 3 Tub Ring albums in that it contains a SETI reference in the title (see The Great Filter), and contains a "Robot" track.

== Track listing ==
1. "Friends and Enemies" – 3:27
2. "The Charismatic Smile" – 2:59
3. "Seven Exodus" – 2:52
4. "Get Help (Now!)" – 2:35
5. "When the Crash Happened" – 2:32
6. "Killers in Love" – 4:13
7. "No One Wants to Play" – 4:23
8. "Requiem for a Robot" – 0:38
9. "Life in Transition" – 3:25
10. "Glass Companion" – 3:20
11. "Making No Sound (At All)" – 3:14
12. "The Truth" – 2:10
13. "Wrong Kind of Message" – 4:19
14. "My Job Here is Done" – 3:16

=== Non-album tracks ===
- "Dynamite" – 3:15 3-2-1 Activate! cover (iTunes exclusive track)
- "This is the Sound" – 2:32 (included on Alter Egos)
- "Touch" – 3:06 (included on Alter Egos)
- "Rock Your Body" – 2:51 Justin Timberlake cover (as yet unreleased, was available on their MySpace page for one day preceding the album's release)
- "The Uninitiated" – 2:01 Rob Kleiner cover (available via a URL given in the album's liner notes)
- "Heathens" – 2:44 (available via a URL given in the album's liner notes)

== Personnel ==
- Kevin Gibson – Vocals
- Rob Kleiner – Keyboards, Producer
- Trevor Erb – Bass guitar
- Chris Wiken – Drums
- Jeff Enokian – Guitar
- Dave Smith – Saxophone
- Dave Winer – Trumpet
- David Keller – Cello
- Charles Crepeau – Violin
- Roxanne Hegyesy – Vocals
- Sara Sleeper – Vocals
- Neal Ostrovsky – Producer, Engineer, Additional Samples
- Tanner Woodford – Art Direction, Design
