= The Alter Boys =

American rock band

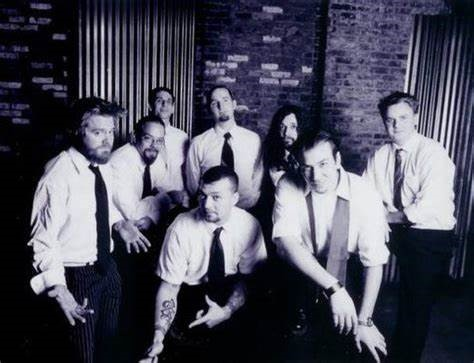
- The Alter Boys in 2005

Background information
- Origin: Cleveland, Ohio, U.S.
- Genres: Experimental rock, avant-garde metal, funk rock
- Years active: 2004–present (inactive)
- Label: Fractured Transmitter

The Alter Boys was an American experimental rock supergroup from Cleveland, Ohio. It included members of the bands Dog Fashion Disco, Polkadot Cadaver, Unified Culture, Mudfoot, Original Pranksta, Venomin James, and Mushroomhead. Also featured in the band was Ryan Dunn of the stunt show Jackass.

The band played various musical styles and released their first album, The Exotic Sounds of the Alter Boys, in March 2005. They were signed to the Fractured Transmitter record label. However, in late February 2009, they were removed from the Fractured Transmitter site. Rotten Records re-released The Exotic Sounds of the Alter Boys in January 2009.

Though they never broke up, Todd Smith has since stated that The Alter Boys are "dead".The remaining band members (minus Jeff Siegel) reunited for a show in 2019.

== Members ==
- Jason Popson – vocals
- Todd Smith – guitar, vocals
- Mike Martini – guitar, accordion, vocals
- Matt Rippetoe – keyboards, woodwind
- Jeff Siegel – keyboards
- Craig Martini – bass, vocals
- Eric Matthews – drums

Former

- Ryan Dunn – additional vocals

== Discography ==
=== Albums ===
| Year | Album details |
|---|---|
| 2005 | The Exotic Sounds of the Alter Boys: Released: March 8 |
