= Honey Bucket (song) =

1993 single by Melvins

Single by Melvins

from the album Houdini
- Released: August 30, 1993
- Genre: Sludge metal; thrash metal; punk rock; grunge
- Length: 3:01
- Label: Atlantic
- Songwriters: Buzz Osborne; Dale Crover
- Producer: Melvins

Melvins singles chronology
"Sawed Off" (1993)	"Honey Bucket" (1993)	"Hooch" (1993)

"Honey Bucket" is a song by American rock band Melvins from their fifth studio album, Houdini (1993). The song was released as the first single from the album on August 30, 1993.

== Personnel ==
- Buzz Osborne – guitar, vocals
- Dale Crover – drums, bass

== Cover versions ==
=== The Dillinger Escape Plan version ===
"Honey Bucket"

Song by The Dillinger Escape Plan

from the album We Reach: The Music of the Melvins
- Released: April 23, 2005
- Length: 2:42
- Label: Fractured Transmitter Recording
- Songwriters: Buzz Osborne; Dale Crover

This song was covered by American mathcore band The Dillinger Escape Plan on April 23, 2005. The Dillinger Escape Plan's version is featured on the tribute album/compilation album We Reach: The Music of the Melvins.

==== Personnel ====
- Greg Puciato – vocals
- Ben Weinman – lead guitar
- James Love – rhythm guitar
- Liam Wilson – bass
- Chris Pennie – drums

=== Burn the Priest version ===
"Honey Bucket"

Song by Burn the Priest

from the album Legion: XX
- Released: May 18, 2018
- Genre: Sludge metal, thrash metal, hardcore punk
- Length: 2:42
- Label: Epic; Nuclear Blast
- Songwriters: Buzz Osborne; Dale Crover
- Producer: Josh Wilbur

This song was covered by American metal band Lamb of God, under their original name Burn the Priest, released on May 18, 2018 on their cover album Legion: XX.

==== Personnel ====
- Randy Blythe – vocals
- Mark Morton – lead guitar
- Willie Adler – rhythm guitar
- John Campbell – bass
- Chris Adler – drums
