= Committed to a Bright Future =

Studio album by Dog Fashion Disco
- Released: May 6, 2003
- Length: 52:45
- Label: Spitfire Records
- Producer: Dog Fashion Disco, Drew Mazurek

Dog Fashion Disco chronology
Anarchists of Good Taste (2001)	Committed to a Bright Future (2003)	Adultery (2006)

Committed to a Bright Future is the fifth studio album by American metal band Dog Fashion Disco, released in 2003. Music videos were made for the songs "The Acid Memoirs","Grease" and "Love Song for a Witch".

Professional ratings
Review scores
Source	Rating
Exclaim!	(favorable)
Rock Hard	8/10 stars
Metal.de	9/10 stars

== Track listing ==
No.	Title	Length
0.	"Grease" (hidden in pregap; Frankie Valli cover)	2:47
1.	"Love Song for a Witch"	4:11
2.	"Rapist Eyes"	5:04
3.	"Dr. Piranha"	2:51
4.	"Fetus on the Beat"	3:32
5.	"Worm in a Dog's Heart"	3:46
6.	"Plastic Surgeons"	3:19
7.	"Pogo the Clown"	2:26
8.	"Castaway"	4:20
9.	"Nude in the Wilderness"	3:31
10.	"The Acid Memoirs"	3:13
11.	"Déjà Vu"	4:01
12.	"Magical Band of Fools"	3:29
Total length:		52:45

Hidden track on some versions
No.	Title	Length
13.	"Scores for Porn"	3:37

=== European release ===
The European release of Committed contained the bonus track "China White". It is a re-recorded version of a song that originally appeared on Erotic Massage, but with a different outro. This version also contains "Grease" as track fifteen, instead of in the hidden time.

No.	Title	Length
14.	"China White"	2:32

All songs written by Dog Fashion Disco except "Grease", written by Barry Gibb of the Bee Gees.

- The song "Déjà Vu" is a version of song "En La Noche" from Experiments In Alchemy, but with alternate lyrics.
- The track "Acid Memoirs" heavily references Timothy Leary, mentioning him by name and including the lyrics "Tuning in and dropping out"
- "Pogo the Clown" (which originally appeared on Experiments in Alchemy) is about the infamous serial killer clown, John Wayne Gacy.

== Personnel ==
- Todd Smith – vocals
- Greg Combs – guitar
- Stephen Mears – bass
- Mike "Ollie" Oliver – drums (although he did not drum on the album)
- John Ensminger – drums
- Jeff Siegel – keyboards
- Matt Rippetoe – saxophones, clarinet and flute (+ woodwind arrangements)

Additional personnel

- Matt Rippetoe – Horns
- Drew Mazurek – Producer, Engineer, Mixer
- Joe Lambert – Mastering
- Jeff Cohen – Legal Representation
- Paul Campanella – Art Design & Layout
- Angela Boatwright – Photography
- Paul Cicoria – Title Design
- Derek Brewer – Manager

Both Greg Combs and John Ensminger played on the album, but quit the band before it was released.
