= Pitch Black Forecast =

American heavy metal band

- Origin: Cleveland, Ohio, U.S.
- Genres: Metalcore, thrash metal, groove metal
- Years active: 2005-Present
- Labels: Fractured Transmitter
- Members: Jason Popson; Gene Hoglan; Steve Rauckhorst; Robert Reinard; Tom Shaffner
- Past members: Craig Martini

Pitch Black Forecast is an American heavy metal supergroup formed in Ohio in 2005, initially under the name Absentee. Its lineup consisted of Mushroomhead frontman Jason Popson, ex-Strapping Young Lad drummer Gene Hoglan, and former Integrity bassist Steve Rauckhorst. They released their debut album, Absentee, in 2008, which featured guest contributions from Lamb of God frontman Randy Blythe and Human Furnace of Ringworm.

== History ==
Hoglan and Popson met back in 2004 while Jason was selling T-shirts for Meshuggah while they were on tour with Strapping Young Lad. Popson was taking a break from touring with Mushroomhead where he was known as J Mann. He never mentioned that he was Mushroomhead's frontman and it wasn't until late in the tour that Hoglan found out. Originally, the group was intended to be similar to Probot with Popson as the vocalist and a revolving door of guitarists and drummers. When Popson was finally ready to record, though, the only one who was not busy was Hoglan. In January 2007, Hoglan flew to Ohio and he and Popson wrote and recorded Absentee in ten days. Guitarist Rob Reinard (NDE) was brought in by studio engineer Bill Korecky. Bassist Craig Martini was also brought in for the band. Popson and Martini are longtime friends and have performed in bands in the past, including Unified Culture, State of Conviction and The Alter Boys. Shortly after finishing recording Absentee Martini left the band in good terms, relocating to Nevada and was replaced by Steve Rauckhorst, who Popson had previously known from the Cleveland scene and his time in Integrity. They played their first show in nearly six months at Peabody's in Cleveland. On May 5, 2011, Pitch Black Forecast announced Tom Shaffner of Keratoma fame would be their new second guitarist. The band's name was originally "Absentee" before switching it to Pitch Black Forecast and using the former as the name of the first album. The first track recorded, titled "Revolve", was included on the Melvins Tribute album We Reach: The Music of the Melvins and released on Popson's record label, Fractured Transmitter.

The band's second album, a five-track EP, titled Burning in Water... Drowning in Flame was recorded at Cleveland's Galahad Studios and was released on August 11, 2012, at a live show for Popson's bands Unified Culture and State of Conviction at Peabody's Down Under in Cleveland. The album features Devin Townsend and M. Shadows from Avenged Sevenfold

In mid-2014, the band's Facebook page mentioned a new album later in the year. The post stated the release would be a compilation of previously released songs remixed and re-tracked to become "closer" to the vision Popson desired from the start. The title of the album was later revealed to be As the World Burns. It was released October 21 on compact disc, vinyl and digital download by Ohio-based Ferocious Records. The album features guest appearances by M. Shadows of Avenged Sevenfold, Randy Blythe of Lamb of God, Devin Townsend, and the Human Furnace. The digital and CD versions both contain a 4-track EP entitled "Spitefuck" by Popson's other side project called Bitch Wrangler. A Best Buy Exclusive version of the CD contains 3 additional tracks.

== Related artists ==
- Mushroomhead – Jason Popson (as J Mann)/Steve Rauckhorst (as Mr. Rauckhorst)/Tom Shaffner (as Tankx)
- (216) – Jason Popson
- In Cold Blood – Jason Popson
- The Alter Boys – Jason Popson
- Strapping Young Lad – Gene Hoglan
- Testament – Gene Hoglan
- Dark Angel – Gene Hoglan
- Death – Gene Hoglan
- Fear Factory – Gene Hoglan
- Dethklok – Gene Hoglan
- NDE – Rob Reinard
- Nailblack – Rob Reinard
- The Alter Boys – Jason Popson/Craig Martin
- State of Conviction – Jason Popson/Craig Martini/Tom Shaffner
- Unified Culture – Jason Popson/Craig Martini
- Integrity – Steve Rauckhorst
- Keratoma – Steve Rauckhorst/Tom Shaffner
- The X Members – Tom Shaffner

== Discography ==
- Absentee (2008)
- Burning in Water... Drowning in Flame (2012)
- As the World Burns (2014)

== Members ==
=== Current members ===
- Jason Popson – vocals (2005–present)
- Gene Hoglan – drums (2005–present)
- Rob Reinard – guitar (2007–present)
- Steve Rauckhorst – bass (2008–present)
- Tom Shaffner – guitar (2009–present)

=== Former members ===
- Craig Martini – bass (2007–2008)

== See also ==
- Fractured Transmitter Recording Company
