= Sweet Nothings (album) =

Studio album by Dog Fashion Disco
- Released: July 22, 2014
- Recorded: 2013–2014
- Length: 69:12
- Label: Rotten
- Producers: Steve Wright & Drew Lamond

Dog Fashion Disco chronology
Adultery (2006)	Sweet Nothings (2014)	Ad Nauseam (2015)

Professional ratings
Review scores
Source	Rating
Metal Storm	7.8/10
Sputnikmusic	4.5/5
Metal Hammer	4/5 stars

Sweet Nothings is the seventh studio album by Dog Fashion Disco, released in 2014. Their first album in eight years, it was written and recorded after the band reunited in 2013, following an almost seven-year hiatus. It is the first album with Tim Swanson of Ideamen on keyboard. However, he played with the band on the 2006 tour in support for their previous album, Adultery. Todd Smith said about the new album: "It was a love letter to our fans who missed us and grew up listening to DFD".

== Background ==
The reformation of the band was announced at the 2013 reunion in Baltimore, where Todd announced that the band was to reunite and put out a new album the following year. The band officially reunited on October 10, 2013. The band was still signed to the Rotten Records label, but receiving no financial support from the label, the band started a fundraising campaign on Indiegogo on February 6, 2014. Asking for $30,000, they reached their goal in under 24 hours, and by the time the fundraiser closed on March 18, 2014, the band had raised $85,122. The album was recorded shortly after, and released on July 22, 2014, through Rotten Records. The album's final, untitled track features Todd Smith thanking everyone who contributed to the Indiegogo campaign by name, as well as promising a follow-up album to be recorded in 2015.

== Track listing ==
All lyrics are written by Todd Smith; all music is composed by Dog Fashion Disco.

No.	Title	Length
1.	"Greta"	3:42
2.	"War Party"	4:16
3.	"Scarlet Fever"	3:46
4.	"Tastes So Sweet"	3:18
5.	"Doctor's Orders"	4:36
6.	"Envy The Vultures"	4:26
7.	"Approach And Recede"	5:30
8.	"Down The Rabbit Hole"	3:37
9.	"We Aren't The World"	5:01
10.	"Struck By Lightning"	4:35
11.	"Sweet Nothings"	3:53
12.	"Pale Horse"	5:54
13.	"End Of The Road"	7:29
14.	"(Hidden Track)"	9:10
Total length:		69:12

== Personnel ==
- Todd Smith – vocals
- Jasan Stepp – guitar
- Tim Swanson – keyboards
- Brian White – bass
- John Ensminger – drums
