= Celebrity Sex Scandal =

US musical group

- Origin: San Antonio, Texas, U.S.
- Genres: Avant-garde metal, progressive metal
- Years active: 2011–present
- Members: Justin Osburn; Greg Combs; Pablo Ortega; John Ensminger; Chadwick Gonzales; Mike Chia; Laith Fisk; Jeff Siegel
- Past members: John Katastrophe; John Ensminger; Tina Bartolucci
- Website: http://www.celebritysexscandal.bigcartel.com/

Celebrity Sex Scandal is an avant-garde metal band from San Antonio, Texas. It was started in 2011 by ex-Dog Fashion Disco guitarist Greg Combs. After raising money through Kickstarter in late 2012, the band released their debut album in February 2013, entitled Derivative.

In early 2014 Celebrity Sex Scandal announced their second album Integral. In July 2014 during a radio interview John and Justin debuted two new songs off of Integral called "Crawl" and "Trapped By The Speed of Light". Integral was released in April 2015. After several years of inactivity a new album titled The Fundamental was announced featuring Dog Fashion Disco alumni John Ensminger and Jeff Siegel. It was released on Razor To Wrist Records in the fall of 2020.

== Members ==
- Justin Osburn - vocals
- Greg Combs - guitar
- Pablo Ortega - bass
- Chadwick Gonzales - percussion/live drums
- John Katastrophe - in studio drums
- Mike Chia - trombone
- Laith Fisk - trumpet
- Jeff Siegel - keyboard

== Discography ==
=== Albums ===
- Derivative (2013)
- Integral (2015)
- The Fundamental (2020)
- Convergence of Infinite Sequences (2023)
