= Anarchists of Good Taste =

Studio album by Dog Fashion Disco
- Released: March 6, 2001
- Studio: Serjical Studios, Valley Village, California
- Length: 51:45
- Label: Spitfire Records
- Producer: Dog Fashion Disco, Drew Mazurek

Dog Fashion Disco chronology
| The Embryo's in Bloom (1998) | Anarchists of Good Taste (2001) | Committed to a Bright Future (2003) |

2002 re-issue
- The cover of the limited edition 2002 re-issue

Professional ratings
Review scores
| Source | Rating |
|---|---|
| Allmusic | 2/5 stars |
| Rock Hard | 9/10 stars |
| Drowned in Sound | 8/10 stars |
| PopMatters | (unfavorable) |
| Exclaim! | (favorable) |

Anarchists of Good Taste is the fourth studio album and major label debut by Dog Fashion Disco. The album is often mistakenly referred to as the band's debut album and "Mushroom Cult", a collaboration with System of a Down frontman Serj Tankian, has been often misattributed to SOAD. The title for the album comes from a line in the song "Cartoon Autopsy". The album was rerecorded and released on December 7, 2018.

== Track listing ==
| No. | Title | Length |
|---|---|---|
| 1. | "Leper Friend" | 4:29 |
| 2. | "9 To 5 At The Morgue" | 4:44 |
| 3. | "Mushroom Cult" (Featuring Serj Tankian) | 4:34 |
| 4. | "Antiquity's Small Rewards" | 3:50 |
| 5. | "Headless" | 4:20 |
| 6. | "Corpse Is A Corpse" | 4:46 |
| 7. | "Valley Girl Ventriloquist" | 3:32 |
| 8. | "Pour Some Urine On Me" | 5:59 |
| 9. | "Vertigo Motel" | 4:47 |
| 10. | "Cartoon Autopsy" | 5:33 |
| 11. | "Pink Riots" | 5:05 |
| Total length: | | 51:45 |

=== 2002 reissue ===
The album was reissued in 2002 in the U.S. with bonus tracks and a music video. The two bonus tracks are from the Mutilated Genitals EP.

| No. | Title | Length |
|---|---|---|
| 12. | "Pervert" | 3:30 |
| 13. | "Albino Rhino" | 3:15 |
| 14. | "Leper Friend" (Video) |

- Track 12 appears as bonus tracks on the European release.

=== Track Information ===
- "Leper Friend", "9 To 5 At The Morgue", and "A Corpse is a Corpse" are re-recorded songs. All three appear on their third album, The Embryo's In Bloom.
- "A Corpse is a Corpse" originally appeared on their debut, Erotic Massage.
- "9 To 5 at the Morgue" originally appeared on their second album, Experiments in Alchemy.

== Personnel ==
- Todd Smith - Vocals
- Greg Combs - Guitar
- Stephen Mears - Bass
- John Ensminger - Drums
- Jeff Siegel - Keyboards

=== Additional Personnel ===
- Matt Rippetoe - Saxophones, Flutes, Clarinet
- Serj Tankian - Additional Vocals on "Mushroom Cult"
- Drew Mazurek - Producer, Engineer, Mixer
- Jake Mossman - Mixing Assistant Engineer
- Tom Baker - Mastering
- Jeff Cohen - Legal Representation
- Paul Campanella - Cover Layout & Artwork
- Dawn Paolini - Spitfire Art Coordinator
- Steve Seabury - A&R
