= Zoo Hypothesis (album) =

Studio album by Tub Ring
- Released: August 17, 2004
- Recorded: Recorded at Apocalypse Cow Recordings, Boulder Hill, IL, 2004
- Genre: Various
- Length: 36:02
- Label: Invisible Records
- Producers: The Brothers Brooks & Theresa Brooks

Tub Ring chronology
Fermi Paradox (2002)	Zoo Hypothesis (2004)	The Great Filter (2007)

Professional ratings
Review scores
Source	Rating
Allmusic	3.5/5 stars

Zoo Hypothesis is the third studio album by Chicago band Tub Ring, released in 2004. The song "Alexander in Charge" contains a sample from the movie Taxi Driver.

== Track listing ==
1. "Tiny, Little" (1:39)
2. "Death of the Robot" (1:30)
3. "The Promise Keeper" (4:43)
4. "Sharpening the Sticks" (1:50)
5. "I Could Never Fall in Love with You" (1:49)
6. "One With my Surroundings" (2:03)
7. "Habitat" (3:29)
8. "The Night Watch" (1:02)
9. "Dog Doesn't Bite" (3:22)
10. "Alexander in Charge" (2:27)
11. "Raindrops" (3:03)
12. "The Viking Song" (1:01)
13. "We are the Righteous" (1:55)
14. "Return to Me" (2:40)
15. "Wealth of Information" (2:38)
16. "Vehicle" (3:23)

All songs written by Tub Ring, except "The Night Watch" written by Roughly Enforcing Nostalgia & Tub Ring

== Personnel ==
- Kevin Gibson – Vocals
- Rob Kleiner – Keyboards
- Jason Fields – Bass
- Dave Tavares – Drums
- Shawn Sprinkel – Guitar

Additional Musicians:

- James Cole – Drums (track 4)
- Matthew Phelan – Violins & Turntables
- Dave Winer – Trumpet
- Dave Smith – Baritone Sax
- Sara Sleeper – Additional Lead Vocals on tracks 5 & 16
- Dave Byron – Additional Lead Guitar
- Theresa Brooks – Bassoon & Background Vocals
- Kathy Brooks – Background Vocals
- Dan Jeremy Brooks – Sampling, Programming & Background Vocals
- Swan – Additional Guitar and Background Vocals

Misc:

- Tanner Woodford – CD Layout
- Joan Varitek – Cover Illustrations
