= The City Is Alive Tonight...Live in Baltimore =

The City Is Alive Tonight...Live In Baltimore

Live album and Video by Dog Fashion Disco
- Released: January 25, 2005
- Recorded: June 14, 2004
- Length: 74:08
- Labels: Artemis Records; Rotten Records

Dog Fashion Disco chronology
Day of the Dead EP (2004)	The City Is Alive Tonight...Live In Baltimore (2005)	Adultery (2006)

Dog Fashion Disco video chronology
DFDVD (2004)	DVD-Day (2005)	DFDVD II (2008)

Professional ratings
Review scores
Source	Rating
Allmusic	3.5/5 stars
somethingFM	3.5/5 stars

The City Is Alive Tonight...Live In Baltimore is a live album by Dog Fashion Disco released on January 25, 2005. It was recorded at Fletcher's, a club in Baltimore, MD, on June 14, 2004. It also contains the bonus DVD, DFD-Day, a recording of the day of the show, the show itself, the party afterwards, and the next morning. The songs "Worm in a Dog's Heart", "Rapist Eyes", "G Eye Joe" & Breed, however, are not present in the DVD, only in the CD. DFD-DAY was directed by Justin McConnell, and partially inspired the production of the feature documentary Working Class Rock Star. The album was re-released in 2006 through Rotten Records.

== Track listing ==
No.	Title	Length
1.	"Worm In A Dog's Heart"	4:12
2.	"Rapist Eyes"	4:18
3.	"Baby Satan"	4:19
4.	"Love Song For A Witch"	5:00
5.	"Vertigo Motel"	5:45
6.	"Toothless Dream"	4:23
7.	"Acid Memoirs"	3:19
8.	"9 To 5 At The Morgue"	4:42
9.	"Pink Riots"	5:25
10.	"Valley Girl Ventriloquist"	5:30
11.	"G Eye Joe"	3:57
12.	"Leper Friend"	4:28
13.	"A Corpse Is A Corpse"	5:22
14.	"Breed"	2:50
15.	"Rat On A Sinking Ship"	5:05
16.	"Albino Rhino"	5:26
Total length:		74:08

All songs except "Breed" written by Dog Fashion Disco. "Breed" is credited as words by Kurt Cobain and music by Nirvana.

== Credits ==
- Todd Smith - Vocals
- Jasan Stepp - Guitar
- Jeff Siegel - Keyboards
- Brian "Wendy" White - Bass
- Mike "Ollie" Oliver - Drums
- Matt Rippetoe - Saxophone & Flute
- Drew Mazurek - Recorder, Engineer, Mixer
- Kevin Kelch - Assistant Engineer
- Joe Lambert - Mastering
- Eric Cole - A&R
- Derek Brewer - Management
- Jeff Cohen, Esq. - Legal
- John Jones - Art Direction & Design
- Wendy Jones - Art Direction & Design
- Amy Weiser - Photography
- Mike Kelley - Booking
- Eric Cole - Project Coordinator
- Unstable Ground - DVD production company
- Justin McConnell - DVD author/director
- Tom Gregg - Cameraman
- Greg Sommer - Cameraman
- Dylan Harrison - Cameraman
