= Secret Handshakes =

Studio album by Tub Ring
- Released: August 31, 2010
- Recorded: 2010; At Electrical Audio and Studio Edison in Chicago, IL.
- Genre: Experimental rock
- Label: The End Records
- Producer: Rob Kleiner

Tub Ring chronology
The Great Filter (2007)	Secret Handshakes (2010)	A Choice of Catastrophes (2017)

Secret Handshakes is Chicago rock-band Tub Ring's 6th album, and their second on The End Records. The CD was released on August 31, 2010. The album breaks several patterns of previous Tub Ring albums. For the first time, the title is unrelated to SETI and contains no "Robot" track. The predominant color of the album cover is red, in contrast to many earlier albums and promo shots which prominently featured blue.

== Track listing ==
1. "Stop This (NOW!)"
2. "Bird Of A Different Color"
3. "Gold Finger"
4. "Touching The Enemy"
5. "Burn"
6. "Cryonic Love Song"
7. "Feed The Rapture"
8. "Flash"
9. "I Shot Your Faggot Horse Bitch"
10. "Chronic Hypersomnia"
11. "Optimistic"
12. "The Day The World Will End"
13. "Tip Of My Tongue"
14. "The Horrible And The Holy"

== Personnel ==
- Kevin Gibson – vocals
- Rob Kleiner – keyboards, producer
- Trevor Erb – bass guitar
- Scott Radway – drums, percussion
- Patrick Windsor – guitar, piano
- Jason Zolghadr tar
- Loren Turner guitar
- Dave Smith baritone sax
- Brandon Wojcik trumpet
- David Keller cello
- Benjamin Weber – viola, violin
- Chibi – vocals
