= N17 (band) =

American industrial metal band

- Origin: Phoenix, Arizona, U.S.
- Genres: Industrial metal
- Years active: 1993–2001, 2007, 2009–present
- Labels: Slipdisc Records, Spitfire
- Past members: Trevor Askew damoN17; Jason Kowalski; Chris Cannella; Mark Keltner; Byron Filson; Tanner Crace; Rudy T Reilly

N17 (sometimes known as November 17) is an American industrial metal band from Phoenix, Arizona. They released two albums and were signed to Slipdisc Records (a division of Mercury Records) until the label closed in late 1999. They are also signed to Spitfire Records.

== History ==
Formed in 1993 in, N17 was one of the original crossover electronic/metal bands. Maintaining a sound of timeless music with their records, Trust No One and Defy Everything, the group stayed true to its run as a band. N17 combines aggressive sound-scapes with heavy guitar riffs, electronic elements and intensive drumming.

The band takes its name from the November 17, 1973, student uprising at Athens Polytechnic University. Twenty students were killed when Greek army tanks suppressed the protests, and the group was formed in part to retaliate against the ruling military junta.

N17 has played and toured with notable bands including Marilyn Manson, Misfits, Fear Factory, Front Line Assembly, Type O Negative, Sevendust and Ministry.

According to the band's official MySpace page, they announced that they were working on a third studio album and a DVD, due for release sometime in fall 2007. This post was later removed, and another post was said that they were disbanding because they were busy with other projects. Their final show was on November 17, 2007, although the band re-united for a show on November 14, 2009, and announced shows for 2010. In early 2011, for the first time since 2002, the band reunited for a four-song surprise reunion with original member Chris Cannella. On November 4, 2015, Chris Cannella, Trevor Askew, Jason Kowalski, damoN17, Byron Filson and Rudy T Reilly reunited again and performed at Club Red in Tempe, Arizona. Mark Keltner was in attendance but did not play. Chris Cannella also played with Deicide from 2019 to 2022 and since 2025 plays with Malevolent Creation as well as Rorschach Test with fellow N-17 bandmate; Jason Kowalski.

== Band members ==
=== Most recent lineup ===
- Trevor Askew – vocals
- Byron Filson – guitars
- Chris Cannella- guitars
- damoN17 – bass
- Jason Kowalski – drums

=== Previous members ===
- Mark Keltner – guitars/programming
- Rudy Reilly – guitar, bass guitar
- Kraig Marshall – vocals

== Discography ==
=== Studio albums ===
| 1994 | N17 – A Different Kind of War (cassette only) | EO17N |
| 1997 | Trust No One | Slipdisc Records |
| 1997 | Tote Aufzuveeken | Slipdisc Records |
| 1999 | Defy Everything | Slipdisc/Spitfire Records |
