= Spitfire Records =

American record label

- Parent company: Eagle Rock Entertainment
- Founded: 1998
- Founder: Paul Bibeau
- Status: Inactive
- Distributor: Eagle Rock Entertainment
- Genre: Heavy metal; doom metal; speed metal; thrash metal; punk rock
- Country of origin: United States
- Location: New York City
- Official website: spitfirerecords.com

Spitfire Records was a subsidiary of Eagle Rock Entertainment located in New York City, New York.

In September 1998, Paul Bibeau founded, launched and rapidly developed Spitfire Records Inc. from a two-man operation located in his home bedroom in suburban Long Island, New York, to one of the premier independent record labels worldwide. The label experienced consistent growth from start-up, Mr. Bibeau successfully negotiated a partnership with Eagle Rock Entertainment (Eagle Vision), a London, England-based audio and visual company.

== Releases ==
- Crimson Glory – Astronomica – 1999
- Testament – The Gathering – 1999
- Pride & Glory – Pride & Glory (reissue) – 1999
- Zakk Wylde – Book of Shadows (reissue) – 1999
- Black Label Society – Sonic Brew – 1999
- Eric Carr – Rockology – 1999
- Sebastian Bach – Bring 'Em Bach Alive! – 1999
- TNT – Transistor – 1999
- Enuff Z'Nuff – Paraphernalia – 1999
- N17 – Defy Everything – 1999
- Raven – Rock Until You Drop (reissue) – 1999
- Raven – Wiped Out (reissue) – 1999
- Raven – All for One (reissue) – 1999
- Race Riot – 2000
- Napalm Death – Enemy of the Music Business – 2000
- Alice Cooper – Brutal Planet – 2000
- Enuff Z'Nuff – 10 – 2000
- Dio – Magica – 2000
- Sixty Watt Shaman – Seed of Decades – 2000
- Black Label Society – Stronger than Death – 2000
- Britny Fox – Long Way to Live! – 2001
- L.A. Guns – Man in the Moon – 2001
- Alice Cooper – Dragontown – 2001
- Apocalyptica – Cult – 2001
- Europe – Prisoners in Paradise (reissue) – 2001
- Lita Ford – Stiletto (reissue) – 2001
- Lita Ford – Dangerous Curves (reissue) – 2001
- Cradle of Filth – Bitter Suites to Succubi – 2001
- Karma to Burn – Almost Heathen – 2001
- Last Hard Men – 2001
- Ted Nugent – Full Bluntal Nugity – 2001
- Black Label Society – Alcohol Fueled Brewtality Live +5 – 2001
- Dog Fashion Disco – Anarchists of Good Taste – 2001
- My Ruin – A Prayer Under Pressure of Violent Anguish – 2001
- Overkill – Wrecking Everything – 2002
- Dio – Killing the Dragon – 2002
- Sixty Watt Shaman – Reason to Live – 2002
- Danzig – I Luciferi – 2002
- L.A. Guns – Waking the Dead – 2002
- Ted Nugent – Craveman – 2002
- Britny Fox – Springhead Motorshark – 2003
- Overkill – Killbox 13 – 2003
- Dog Fashion Disco – Committed to a Bright Future – 2003
- The Exploited – Fuck the System – 2003
- Therapy? – High Anxiety – 2003
- Black Label Society – The Blessed Hellride – 2003
- Cathedral – The VIIth Coming – 2003
- The Go-Go's – God Bless the Go-Go's (reissue) – 2004
- Black Label Society – Hangover Music Vol. VI – 2004
- Therapy? – Never Apologise Never Explain – 2004
- Overkill – ReliXIV – 2005
- Beautiful Creatures – Deuce – 2005
- Rich Ward – My Kung Fu Is Good – 2005
- Nashville Pussy – Get Some! – 2005
- Therapy? – One Cure Fits All – 2006

== See also ==
- List of record labels
