= The Embryo's in Bloom =

The Embryo's In Bloom

Studio album by Dog Fashion Disco
- Released: 1998; re-issued September 5, 2006
- Genres: Alternative metal, avant-garde metal
- Length: 41:51
- Labels: OuterLoop Records; Rotten Records
- Producers: Dog Fashion Disco, Drew Mazurek

Dog Fashion Disco chronology
Experiments in Alchemy (1998)	The Embryo's In Bloom (1998)	Anarchists of Good Taste (2001)

2006 re-release
- The 2006 Rotten Records re-issue cover

The Embryo's In Bloom is Dog Fashion Disco's third album, originally released on OuterLoop Records in 1998, then reissued in 2000 before going out of print in 2001. The studio quality of this album is noticeably better than the band's preceding albums, and they were subsequently pleased with the resulted sound. It was re-released by Rotten Records in 2006.

== Reception ==
In her July 1999 review, Cheryl Botchick of CMJ New Music Report compared the album to artists such as Faith No More, Mr. Bungle and Incubus. She stated that it is "quirky and irreverent enough to hold the interest of fans of hybridized funk/metal bands like Faith No More", adding that "vocalist Todd Smith is an even mix of the cartoonish, possessed howl of Mike Patton and the heavily processed growl of Rob Zombie."

== Track listing ==
No.	Title	Length
1.	"Siamese Fever"	5:07
2.	"Toothless Dream"	4:19
3.	"G Eye Joe"	3:30
4.	"Leper Friend"	4:16
5.	"9 To 5 At The Morgue"	4:31
6.	"A Corpse Is A Corpse"	4:36
7.	"Pervert"	3:28
8.	"Fetus On The Beat"	4:05
9.	"The Satanic Cowboy"	3:21
10.	"God Crisis"	4:33
Total length:		41:51

== Album information ==
- The track "A Corpse Is A Corpse" is omitted from the track listing, but is not omitted from the sleeve.
- As with Experiments in Alchemy, tracks 3–8 were re-recorded and appear on later albums in some form.
- The title comes from a line in the song "God Crisis".
- This is the only Dog Fashion Disco release to not feature horns.

=== Track information ===
- "G Eye Joe" and "A Corpse Is A Corpse" are re-recorded songs from their first album, Erotic Massage.
- "9 to 5 at the Morgue" and "The Satanic Cowboy" are re-recorded songs from their second album Experiments in Alchemy.

== Personnel ==
- Todd Smith - Vocals
- Greg Combs - Guitars
- Stephen Mears - Bass
- Sennen Quigley - Keyboards, Guitar
- John Ensminger - Drums

=== Additional personnel ===
- Tom Baker - Mastering
- Drew Mazurek - Recording, Co-Producer, Mixing
- Jake Mossman - Assistant Mixer
- Mike Rippe - Assistant Mixer
