= Race Riot (album) =

2000 compilation album by various artists

Compilation album by Various Artists
- Released: July 18, 2000
- Recorded: 1998–1999
- Genre: Gangsta rap, hardcore hip hop, rap rock, underground hip hop
- Label: Spitfire
- Producer: Twiztid; Paul O'Neill; Woodie; The R.O.C; Esham

Professional ratings
Review scores
Source	Rating
Allmusic	(?)

Race Riot is a compilation album released by Spitfire on July 18, 2000. The album consists of such popular names as M.O.P., Insane Clown Posse and Machine Head among others.

== Album cover ==
The album cover makes a reference to N.W.A.'s 100 Miles and Runnin'.

== Track listing ==
#	Title	Featured Artist	Time
1	V12 Niggaz	Firestarr	4:03
2	Handle Ur Bizness	M.O.P	4:26
3	Rock the Dead	Twiztid, Insane Clown Posse and Mike E. Clark	5:03
4	Cunt Killer	Esham and Violent J	2:45
5	Everyday	Kottonmouth Kings	3:43
6	House of Horrors & Terrible	Insane Clown Posse	4:21
7	Wrong Time	AKP	3:33
8	Night & Day	Natas	4:05
9	Scrilla	Graveyard Shift	4:26
10	Colors	Machine Head	4:57
11	Game On	Cadillace Todd	4:43
12	This Is Northern Cali	Woodie, Shadow	4:29
13	Airborne	Halfbreed	4:27
14	Lady Killer	Johnny Richter	4:59
15	Vultures	Land Of Da Lost and K.O.	2:53
16	Young Independent & Rich	Botany Boyz	4:02
17	Untitled Track		
