= Todd Smith (musician) =

American singer

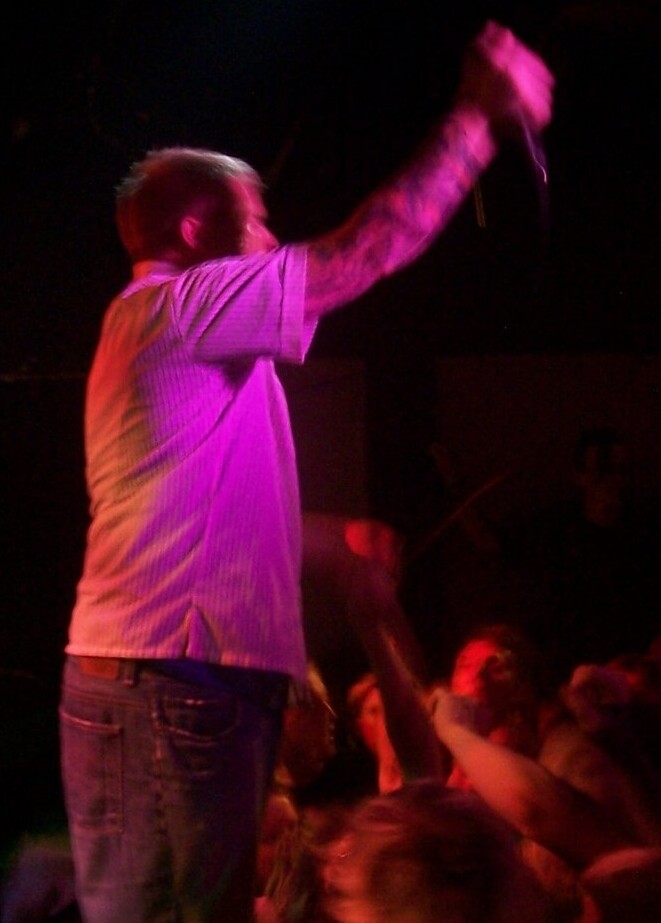
- Smith performing in 2006

Background information
- Born: Todd Edward Smith
- Genres: Experimental metal, alternative metal, experimental rock, groove metal, acoustic rock, funk rock
- Occupation(s): Singer, musician, songwriter
- Instruments: Vocals, guitar
- Years active: 1995–present
- Website: razortowrist.com

Todd Edward Smith is an American singer, songwriter and guitarist who most notably fronts the rock band Dog Fashion Disco. He is also involved with the bands Polkadot Cadaver, Knives Out!, Beyond Paranoid, and his solo project El-Creepo!

== Background ==
Smith was the lead singer and songwriter for the multi-genre metal band Dog Fashion Disco from 1996 until 2007, and continued in this role when the band reformed in 2011 until the present day. Smith contributed vocal and guitar work to the 2005 album The Exotic Sounds of the Alter Boys by the Ohio-based band The Alter Boys. On February 18, 2007, Smith started a musical project called Polkadot Cadaver, announced shortly after the break-up of Dog Fashion Disco. Another project, Knives Out! was started in 2008, and each band contains Jasan Stepp (of Dog Fashion Disco). Six albums, One Five track live album, One Six track Christmas Album and Three Singles have been released with Polkadot Cadaver and two albums have been released with Knives Out!

=== Solo career ===
Smith has also released three solo album under the moniker El-Creepo! The first album was released in 2009 and was aptly titled El-Creepo!. The project is stylistically quite different from his work in other bands, favoring acoustic guitars and light harmonies. Smith began writing and recording a new El-Creepo! album with Polkadot Cadaver drummer Scott Radway in March 2012. The second solo album, Aloha was released November 13, 2012. The third and most recent album titled Bellissimo! was released January 1, 2016.

=== Razor to Wrist Records ===
In early 2011, Smith and fellow band-mate Jasan Stepp started up the record label Razor to Wrist Records with the intention of releasing their material on their own label, with the main bands being "signed" initially Dog Fashion Disco, Polkadot Cadaver, Knives Out!, and El-Creepo!. Though Polkadot Cadaver's album Sex Offender was released after the label was founded, the album was still released on Rotten Records (as the first Polkadot Cadaver album was).

The first album to be released by the label was Knives Out!'s Black Mass Hysteria on February 14, 2012. In the summer of 2012, the Dog Fashion Disco video DFDVD was re-released on Razor to Wrist, and on November 13, 2012, the second El-Creepo album Aloha was the second album to be released on the label. The third album released on the label was Polkadot Cadaver's third album Last Call in Jonestown, released on May 14, 2013. All future material involving either Smith or Stepp is set to be released on Razor to Wrist.

Left in the Lurch is Knives Out!'s second album, released on August 19, 2016.

All of the label's releases up to this point have been available in physical form only through the label's website; digital copies of the material is available on Amazon, iTunes, etc.

The label's name is derived from the song "Forever and a Day" from the Polkadot Cadaver album Sex Offender.

== Style ==
During the extent of Smith's work as a vocalist, his singing ability has encompassed a range of styles, including a high falsetto, lounge-style singing, guttural growls, and death metal vocals, often incorporating all four into single songs.

== Discography ==
=== Dog Fashion Disco ===
- Self-released demo (1996)
- Erotic Massage (1997)
- Experiments in Alchemy (1998)
- The Embryo's in Bloom (1998)
- Anarchists of Good Taste (2001)
- Mutilated Genitals EP (2001)
- Committed to a Bright Future (2003)
- Day of the Dead EP (2004)
- The City Is Alive Tonight...Live in Baltimore (2005)
- Adultery (2006)
- Beating a Dead Horse to Death... Again (2008)
- Sweet Nothings (2014)
- Ad Nauseam (2015)
- Erotic Massage (2017)
- Experiments in Embryos (2018)
- Anarchists of Good Taste (2018)
- Committed to a Bright Future (2019)
- Tres Pendejos (2019)
- Live from the Virology Lab (2021)
- Cult Classic (2022)

=== The Alter Boys ===
- The Exotic Sounds of the Alter Boys (2005)

=== Polkadot Cadaver ===
- Purgatory Dance Party (2007)
- Sex Offender (2011)
- Last Call in Jonestown (2013)
- From Bethlehem to Oblivion (2013)
- Get Possessed (2017)
- Purgatory Dance Party! (2020)
- Live from the Virology Lab (EP) (2021)
- Echoes Across the Hellscape (2023)

=== El-Creepo! ===
- El-Creepo! (2009)
- Aloha (2012)
- Bellissimo! (2016)

=== Knives Out! ===
- Rough Cuts (EP) (2010)
- Black Mass Hysteria (2012)
- Left in the Lurch (2016)

=== Beyond Paranoid ===
- Dead Meat (2021)
