= Knives Out! =

American alternative metal band

- Origin: Baltimore, Maryland, U.S.
- Genres: Alternative metal
- Years active: 2008–present
- Labels: Razor to Wrist
- Members: Todd Smith; Tom Maxwell; Jasan Stepp; David Cullen; Tommy Sickles
- Website: Knives Out! on Facebook

Knives Out! is an American alternative metal band consisting of members of Dog Fashion Disco, Hellyeah, Nothingface, and Polkadot Cadaver. Stylistically, they are heavier than vocalist Todd Smith and guitarist Jasan Stepp's other bands Dog Fashion Disco and Polkadot Cadaver.

== History ==
Knives Out! formed in 2008 with members of Dog Fashion Disco, Hellyeah, Nothingface, and Polkadot Cadaver and began work on their debut album in mid-2009. They released a four-track EP titled The Rough Cuts in 2010 and full debut album, titled Black Mass Hysteria, on February 14, 2012 on the band's label Razor to Wrist Records.

A music video has been made for the song Blood Everywhere, and a lyric video for Robot Babylon.

== Band members ==
- Todd Smith – vocals (2008–present)
- Tom Maxwell – lead guitar (2008–present)
- Jasan Stepp – rhythm guitar (2008–present)
- David Cullen – bass (2008–present)
- Tommy Sickles – drums, percussion (2008–present)

== Discography ==
Year	Title	Label
2010	The Rough Cuts (EP)	SICK6 Records
2012	Black Mass Hysteria	Razor to Wrist
2016	Left in the Lurch	Razor to Wrist
