= Dog Fashion Disco =

American metal band

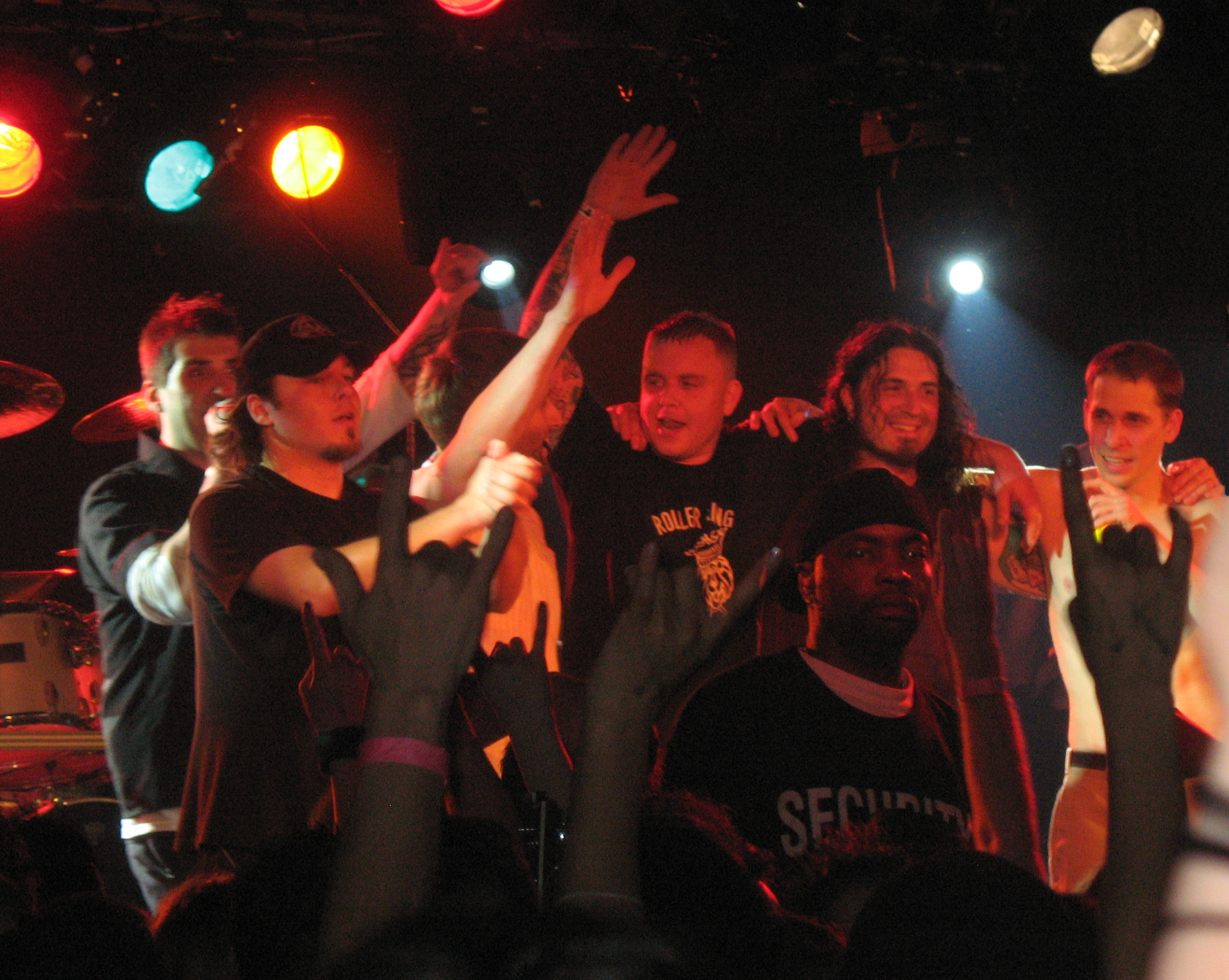
- The band after their original farewell show on January 14, 2007

Background information
- Also known as: DFD; Hug the Retard
- Origin: Rockville, Maryland, U.S.
- Genres: Avant-garde metal; alternative metal; progressive metal
- Years active: 1995–2007, 2013–present (reunions 2008, 2010, 2011, 2013)
- Labels: Outerloop, Spitfire, Artemis, Rotten, Razor to Wrist
- Spinoffs: Polkadot Cadaver
- Members: Todd Smith; Jasan Stepp; Brian "Wendy" White; Tim Swanson; John Ensminger; Matt Rippetoe
- Past members: Greg Combs; Stephen Mears; Jeff Siegel; Mike "Ollie" Oliver; Sennen Quigley; Jason Stevens; Mark Ammen; Geoff Stewart; Kristen Ensminger; Josh Gifford; Dave Sislen; Ken Willard
- Website: razortowrist.com

Dog Fashion Disco (often shortened to DFD) is an American avant-garde/alternative metal band from Rockville, Maryland. They were originally active from 1995 to 2007, then disbanded before reuniting in October 2013.

== History ==
=== Early years (1995–2000) ===
Dog Fashion Disco, or DFD as many fans refer to them as, was formed in 1995 by Todd Smith, Greg Combs, and John Ensminger, who all went to high school together. Originally, their name was Hug the Retard, but this name was changed to Dog Fashion Disco before releasing any material, as they felt it was too offensive and might cost them fans.

Their first two releases were self-released and low-budget products. The first, Erotic Massage, was funded by a loan taken out by drummer John Ensminger, which his father had to co-sign on and "took nearly a year of local shows to pay off the part of the loan that was used for studio time, printing and pressing", and was released independently by the band in 1997. The second self-released album was titled Experiments in Alchemy and released in 1998. Experiments saw more heavy metal numbers, as opposed to the more ballady feel on many of Massage's songs. That same year, DFD signed with Outerloop Records and released The Embryo's in Bloom. The studio quality of the album is noticeably better than its predecessors, and the band was very pleased with the resulted sound. It was then that their management by Maryland resident Derek J. Brewer began and lasted until they disbanded. Polkadot Cadaver is now also managed by Derek J. Brewer under Outerloop Management. In late 1998, Jeff Siegel would join the band as the keyboard player, replacing Sennen Quigley. This lineup would be the longest lasting lineup and stay intact for over four years.

=== Rising popularity and personnel changes (2000–2004) ===
In 2000, DFD played on USA Network's FarmClub. The exposure received from the show lead them to signing with Spitfire Records. With the release of their major label debut Anarchists of Good Taste in 2001 on Spitfire Records, DFD saw much wider popularity and distribution of their music than ever before, and recorded a track with System of a Down frontman Serj Tankian providing vocals for the track "Mushroom Cult" on the Anarchists album. This song is often wrongly attributed to System of a Down, although Serj Tankian was the only member of System of a Down to perform on the track. The band shot their first music video for the song "Leper Friend" and embarked on their first UK tour in support of the album. DFD also toured with the likes of Mindless Self Indulgence and Tub Ring through 2002.

In 2003, they released Committed to a Bright Future on Spitfire Records and supported Lacuna Coil on their first U.S. headlining tour. Although the album contains the same lineup as Anarchists, both guitarist Greg Combs and drummer John Ensminger left the band before it was released, the latter being replaced by Mike "Ollie" Oliver before the album was released (and is pictured in the album booklet, as well as being listed as an official member of the band). Ensminger and Combs were credited as performing on the album, though not as band members. The spot of lead guitar was temporarily filled by Jason Stevens for the Committed tour, during which bassist and original member Stephen Mears left the band to join the Navy. Mears was replaced by Brian White, and after the tour, Stevens was replaced by Margret Heater member Jasan Stepp as lead guitarist. This lineup recorded the Day of the Dead EP and the live album The City Is Alive Tonight, released in 2004 and 2005 respectively, and is the band lineup in DFDVD.

=== Rotten Records, Adultery and hiatus (2005–2007) ===
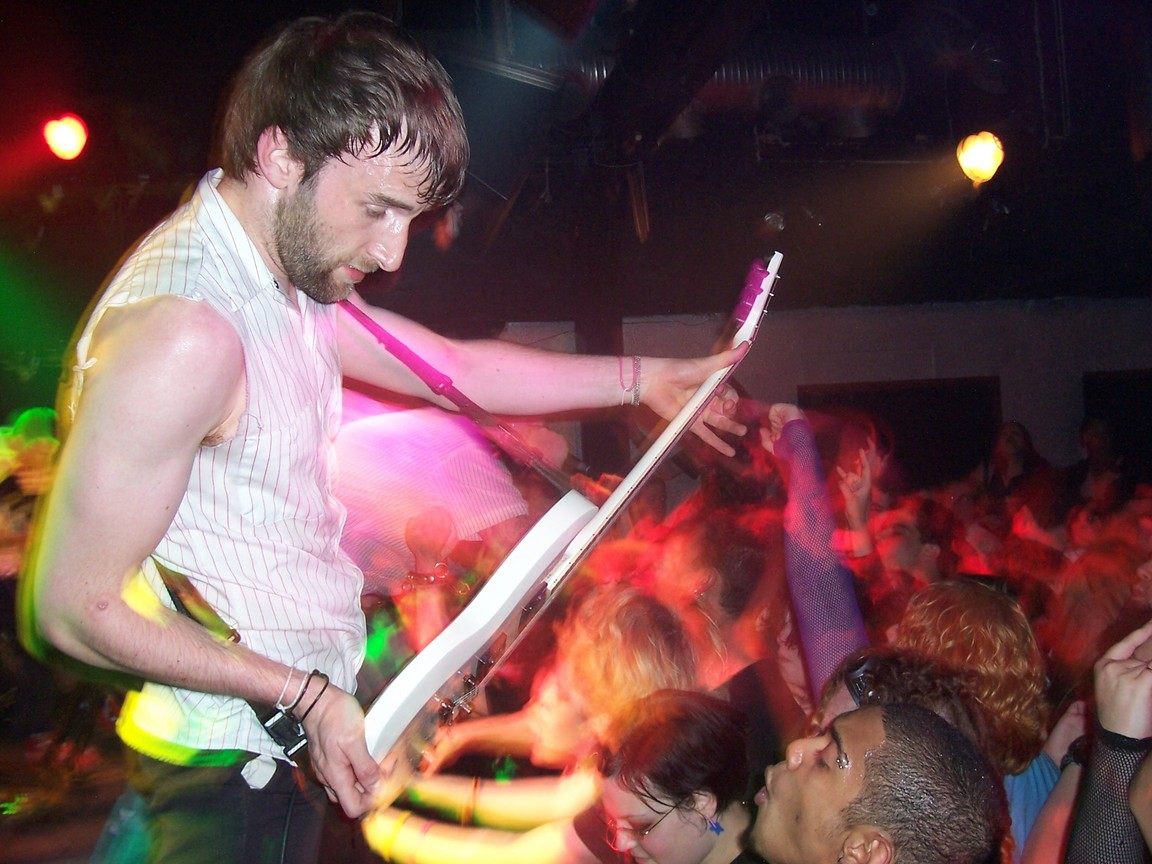
Guitarist Jasan Stepp performing with DFD at Fletchers Bar in Baltimore, Maryland

After a short period of off-time in the first half of 2005 (in which The Alter Boys sole album was made and released), Oliver quit the band. Shortly after, DFD's contract with Artemis was ended, and DFD were signed to Rotten Records. On April 4, 2006, they released their sixth studio album, Adultery, which featured the return of original drummer John Ensminger. Their CD release party was held at Peabody's in Cleveland on the April 6 with Tub Ring. The band toured in support for the release of Adultery along with Tub Ring during the summer of 2006, in which keyboardist Tim Swanson temporarily replaced Jeff Siegel. Many of the shows took place in smaller venues (with subsequently smaller audiences) than their tours while signed to Spitfire and Artemis, and, according to Jasan Stepp, resulted in low morale among the band.

On December 5, 2006, Todd Smith Dog posted a blog entry on Dog Fashion Disco's official MySpace stating that the band had decided to call it quits. They performed their farewell show at the Sonar Lounge in Baltimore, Maryland on January 13, 2007, to a capacity crowd, with fans coming from as far away as the United Kingdom. The band played a marathon 25+ song set, ending with the crowd-favorite "Albino Rhino" from the 1998 Experiments in Alchemy album (this was a common concert-closer), and played the song "Sweet Insanity" from their newest album, Adultery, for an encore song. Other past band members including Sennan Quigley and Mike "Ollie" Oliver attended to show support for their former musical family. The show was opened by the band Oddzar. The event was recorded and then released on the DVD DFDVD II by Rotten Records in October 2008.

=== Reunions (2008–2013) ===
The group reunited four times after breaking up before reforming as an active band again in 2013.

They first reunited on September 12, 2008, for the release of DFDVD II and their compilation Beating a Dead Horse to Death... Again. The show featured Stephen Mears on bass for the first time in nearly 5 years.

The second reunion (and first with the final lineup) took place on April 17, 2010, at The Ottobar. The show was opened by Smith and Stepp's side projects Polkadot Cadaver and Knives Out!

They reunited once more on June 24 and 25, 2011 for the tenth and fifth anniversary of their albums Anarchists of Good Taste and Adultery, respectively. At the second show, Dog Fashion Disco announced that they will be releasing an acoustic album. Attendees of the reunion shows with VIP passes were provided with a code that allowed them to download an acoustic version of their song "Sweet Insanity." it was also announced that the concert series are to be released on DVD sometime in the future. These DVD and acoustic plans have been postponed and their fates are uncertain.

The most recent reunion was a two-night set of shows that took place on May 31 and June 1, 2013, at Baltimore Sound Stage, featuring the Adultery lineup like the previous two reunions. These Shows were preceded by an El-Creepo! "warm up" show at The Ottobar on May 30, which included drummers John Ensminger and Scott Radway, as well as Jasan Stepp. The first night of the reunion featured original guitarist Greg Combs on stage with DFD for the first time in over 10 years. At the second show, Smith announced plans for a new album, with the title "Sweet Nothings".

=== Reformation (2013–present) ===
On October 10, 2013, a status update via the Polkadot Cadaver Facebook page confirmed that Dog Fashion Disco is officially back together as a band. The lineup is the same as the previous three reunions; Swanson will replace Siegel on keyboards again. Mike Oliver was expected to play drums on the summer tour of 2014.

The first album from DFD in eight years, Sweet Nothings, was released on July 22, 2014, after being funded through Indiegogo. Due to the success from their Indiegogo campaign, in 2015 the band announced that they will be releasing a follow-up album entitled Ad Nauseum. They also announced three nights in London, England, for September 2014, and the success of those sell-out dates prompted a UK tour with Psychostick in 2015. The album was released on October 2, 2015.

The band began releasing re-recorded versions of their earlier albums, in order to reclaim the rights to the music from their former record labels. The first of these was Erotic Massage, which was released on May 19, 2017. This was followed up by another re-recorded album, Experiments in Embryos, released on July 6, 2018. The third album, Anarchists of Good Taste, was released on December 7, 2018, and the last of the re-records, Committed to a Bright Future, was released on June 28, 2019.

Moonlight City Drive, a novelization of DFD's 2006 concept album Adultery, was written by Brian Paone and published in November 2017.

== Musical style ==
The band combines many different music styles (1960s psychedelic, jazz, piano recital, heavy metal, circus music and vocals, among others). The lyrical content is often highly esoteric and satirical, with constant tongue-in-cheek references to the occult, drug use, and mutilation. Their sound has often been compared to the Californian genre-defying act Mr. Bungle. The band members themselves have cited their collective influences as being Mike Patton, his bands Mr. Bungle and Faith No More, Clutch, Tool, System of a Down, and Frank Zappa.

The German music magazine Rock Hard wrote in their review of the band's album Anarchists of Good Taste that "The combo makes it clear right from the first track, 'Leper Friend', that it's more than just another nu metal band with a weird outfit and bizarre lyrics". Sputnikmusic said that "Dog Fashion Disco have always been difficult to pin down. Combining such potentially dissimilar genres as alternative metal, funk and cabaret, the collective made a name for themselves with their unique crossover style." Blabbermouth said in a review of the band's album Adultery that Dog Fashion Disco "is genre-less and proud of it"; the band's style was described as a "blend of strangely accessible hard rock, metal, punk, jazz [and] ska". AllMusic said that "Dog Fashion Disco, with their crunching guitar chords, swirling lead guitars, warped organs, and evil vocals, à la any thrash metal band U.S.A., sound like the musical equivalent of death" and that on the album Anarchists of Good Taste, the band "seems to be in a contest to see whether they can outwarp the likes of Marilyn Manson". The website classified Dog Fashion Disco as an alternative metal band, while The Baltimore Sun categorized the band as progressive metal. PopMatters called the band's music a blend of "evil circus music" and rock, and The PRP classified them as avant-garde metal.

== Members ==
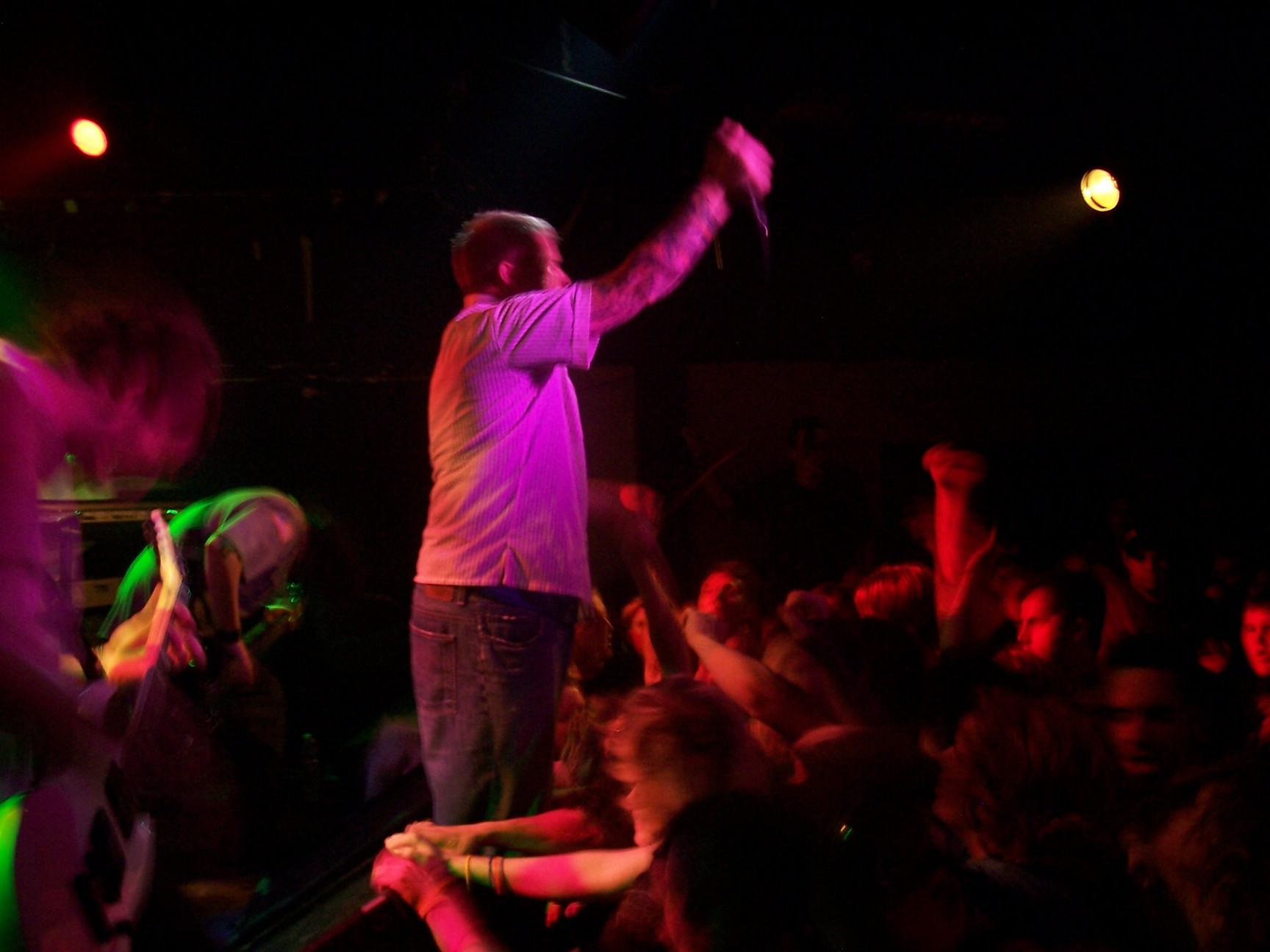
Vocalist Todd Smith performing with DFD at Fletchers Bar in Baltimore, Maryland in April 2006

Current lineup

- Todd Smith — vocals (1995–2007, 2013–present); reunions 2008, 2010, 2011, and 2013
- Jasan Stepp — guitars (2003–2007, 2013–present); reunions 2008, 2010, 2011, and 2013
- Brian "Wendy" White — bass (2003–2007, 2013–present); reunions 2010, 2011, and 2013
- Tim Swanson — keyboards (2006, 2013–present)
- John Ensminger — drums (1995–2003, 2006–2007, 2013–present); reunions 2008, 2010, 2011, and 2013
- Matt Rippetoe — saxophones and woodwinds (2013–present; session player 2001–2006); reunions 2011 and 2013

Previous members

- Greg Combs — guitars (1995–2003); reunion 2013
- Stephen Mears aka "Grand Master Super Eagle Sultan" — bass (1996–1998; 1998–2003); reunion 2008
- Jeff Siegel — keyboards (1998–2006; 2006–2007); reunions 2008, 2010, 2011, and 2013
- Mike "Ollie" Oliver — drums (2003–2005), (2014–2015) (live)
- Sennen Quigley — guitars, keyboards (1997–1998)
- Mark Ammen — bass (1998)
- Rob Queen — drums (2015 (live))
- Jason Stevens — guitar (2003)
- Geoff Stewart — alto/tenor/bari saxophone (1997–1998)
- Kristen Ensminger — trumpet (1997–1998)
- Josh Gifford — trumpet (1996–1997)
- Dave Sislen — saxophone (1996–1997)
- Ken Willard — bass (1995)

Timeline

== Discography ==
=== Studio albums ===
Title	Album details
Erotic Massage	Released: 1997; Label: Self-released; Formats: CD, Vinyl
Experiments in Alchemy	Released: 1998; Label: Self-released, Rotten Records (2006 re-release); Format: CD
The Embryo's in Bloom	Released: 1998; Label: OuterLoop, Rotten Records (2006 re-release); Format: CD
Anarchists of Good Taste	Released: March 6, 2001; Label: Spitfire; Format: CD
Committed to a Bright Future	Released: May 6, 2003; Label: Spitfire; Format: CD
Adultery	Released: April 4, 2006; Label: Rotten Records; Format: CD, Vinyl
Sweet Nothings	Released: July 22, 2014; Label: Rotten Records; Format: CD, LP
Ad Nauseam	Released: October 2, 2015; Label: Rotten Records; Format: CD
Tres Pendejos	Released: November 22, 2019; Label: Razor to Wrist; Format: CD
Cult Classic	Released: March 12, 2022; Label: Razor to Wrist; Format: CD

=== Re-recorded albums ===
Title	Album details
Erotic Massage (Redux)	Released: May 19, 2017; Label: Razor to Wrist; Format: CD, CS
Experiments in Embryos	Released: July 6, 2018; Label: Razor to Wrist; Format: CD
Anarchists of Good Taste – 2018	Released: December 7, 2018; Label: Razor to Wrist; Format: CD
Committed to a Bright Future 2019	Released: June 28, 2019; Label: Razor to Wrist; Format: CD

=== Compilation albums ===
Title	Album details
Beating a Dead Horse to Death... Again	Released: October 28, 2008; Label: Rotten Records; Format: CD

=== Live albums ===
Title	Album details
The City Is Alive Tonight...Live in Baltimore	Released: January 25, 2005; Label: Artemis; Format: CD
Adultery (Live)	Released: April 19, 2024; Label: Razor to Wrist; Format: CD, Blu-Ray, Vinyl, Digital

=== EPs ===
Title	EP details
Mutilated Genitals EP	Released: September 3, 2001; Label: Spitfire; Format: CD
Day of the Dead EP	Released: June 2004; Label: Self-released; Format: CD

=== Music videos ===
Title	Details
Tastes So Sweet	Released: August 14, 2014; Label: Rotten Records; Written & Directed by Ric Peters

=== DVDs ===
Title	DVD details
DFDVD	Released: June 15, 2004; Label: OuterLoop; Format: DVD
DFD-Day	Released: January 25, 2005; Label: Artemis; Format: DVD; Note: Bonus DVD packaged with The City Is Alive Tonight...Live in Baltimore
DFDVD II	Released: September 12, 2008; Label: Rotten Records; Format: DVD

== Post-disbandment bands ==
=== Polkadot Cadaver ===
On April 17, 2007, a bulletin was posted on the Dog Fashion Disco MySpace page, announcing a new project, Polkadot Cadaver, which is stylistically similar to Dog Fashion Disco. The project features Todd Smith, Jasan Stepp and John Ensminger. The project's MySpace page has four songs and an album (Purgatory Dance Party) which was released on the week of November 17, 2007, for pre-orders and had a street date of November 27, 2007.

"Its not a DFD song but it's the closest thing that you are ever going to get again. Todd and I have been putting in quite a bit of time working on material for all of you kiddies. We are excited about the direction of this project and we are looking forward hearing what you think."

— Jasan Stepp on "A Wolf in Jesus Skin", via a Dog Fashion Disco MySpace Bulletin

They released their second album, Sex Offender on May 10, 2011. Their third album (and first on their own record label Razor to Wrist Records), Last Call in Jonestown, was released on May 14, 2013.

=== Knives Out! ===
In late 2008, Todd Smith and Jasan Stepp teamed up with members of Nothingface as well as Hellyeah to form Knives Out!. They released their debut album, Black Mass Hysteria, on February 14, 2012. Their follow-up album, Left in the Lurch, was released on August 19, 2016.

=== El-Creepo! ===
In 2010, Smith released his first solo album titled El-Creepo! under this moniker. He released his second album under the El-Creepo! name, entitled Aloha, in 2012, and the third Bellissimo! on January 1, 2016.

=== Celebrity Sex Scandal ===
In 2012, ex-guitarist Greg Combs's new band Celebrity Sex Scandal released their first single "Ode to Katy Perry". Their full-length debut, entitled Derivative, was released in February 2013. In 2015 Celebrity Sex Scandal released their second album Integral.

=== Other projects ===
Todd Smith, Matt Rippetoe and Jeff Siegel are members of The Alter Boys since 2005, although Todd Smith has stated that The Alter Boys will not release any new material.

Tim Swanson has since formed the band Ideamen. The band released an EP titled Progress in 2007 Their full-length debut studio album, May You Live in Interesting Times, was released in 2009 on Rotten Records and their second full-length album Schemata, was released in 2014. Matt Rippetoe released a solo record, BOINK in 2007, and formed a side project, Willamette, who released their self-titled debut in 2012.
