= Last Call in Jonestown =

Studio album by Polkadot Cadaver
- Released: May 14, 2013
- Recorded: Wrightway Studios, Baltimore, Maryland
- Genre: Avant-garde metal, alternative metal, experimental rock
- Length: 47:51
- Label: Razor to Wrist Records
- Producer: Polkadot Cadaver

Polkadot Cadaver chronology
Sex Offender (2011)	Last Call in Jonestown (2013)	From Bethlehem to Oblivion (2013)

Last Call in Jonestown is the third studio album by American metal band Polkadot Cadaver, released on May 14, 2013.

== Background ==
It is the first album by the band with Scott Radway on drums, who had been a live member since 2010. On June 15, 2013, the album entered the Billboard Heatseekers chart at number 38. Later that year, plans were announced for a colored vinyl release of the album. Limited to 500 copies, the vinyl became available for pre-order on September 27 and began to ship in early November 2013.

The song "Last Call in Jonestown" is inspired by the Jonestown massacre, a mass-suicide led by Jim Jones, leader of the Peoples Temple (an American cult), in which 918 individual cult members died in Guyana in the Peoples Temple Agricultural Project (better known as Jonestown).

== Track listing ==
All music is composed by Polkadot Cadaver, Razor to Wrist Publishing ASCAP.

No.	Title	Length
1.	"Last Call in Jonestown"	4:01
2.	"Phantasmagoria"	4:13
3.	"Painkiller"	3:49
4.	"Touch You Like Caligula"	5:20
5.	"Sheer Madness"	2:45
6.	"Impure Thoughts"	4:10
7.	"Rats and Black Widows"	3:09
8.	"Lunatic"	4:00
9.	"All the Kings Men"	3:47
10.	"Animal Kingdom"	4:16
11.	"Transistors of Mercy" (feat. Neil Fallon)	5:25
12.	"Epilogue"	2:50
Total length:		47:51

== Personnel ==
- Todd Smith – vocals, guitar, bass
- Jasan Stepp – guitar, bass, keyboards
- Scott Radway – drums, keyboards, guitar, bass (except tracks 3 and 11)

=== Additional personnel ===
- Dave Cullen – bass (tracks 3 and 11)
- John Ensminger – drums (tracks 3 and 11)
- Neil Fallon – vocals (track 11)
- Jon Radway – saxophone (track 10)
- Carl Bahner – trumpet (track 10)
- Drew Lamonde – engineering
- Steve Wright – mixing, mastering
- Patrick Lamond – cover art
