= Osi and the Jupiter =

American neo-folk band

- Origin: Kent, Ohio, United States
- Genres: neo-folk, folk
- Instrument(s): Acoustic Guitar, Cello, Synthesizers, Organs, Drone
- Years active: 2015 - present
- Labels: Eisenwald
- Members: Sean Kratz, Kakaphonix
- Website: https://osifolk.bandcamp.com/

Osi and the Jupiter are a neo-folk band from Kent, Ohio, United States, consisting of multi-instrumentalist and songwriter Sean Kratz and celloist Kakaphonix. The band is named after Kratz's two German Shepherd dogs, Osiris and Jupiter. They formed in 2015 and have put out five releases including 2016's Halls of the Wolf, 2020's Appalachia and 2021's Stave. They have released multiple records through German underground folk and metal label Eisenwald, including a collaboration album, Songs of Origin and Spirit, with other bands on the label.

== History and Style ==
Reviewers have described Osi and the Jupiter's sound as "Paganistic folk with flourishes of orchestral splendour," and "authentic, beautiful recordings that pay homage to traditional mysticism." Kratz' has said in interviews that just a couple of his musical influences are American singer-songwriter Townes Van Zandt, Italian progressive rock band Goblin and experimental Norwegian group Ulver. Thematically, Osi and the Jupiter records focus on "the spiritual journey of connecting to nature" and "folklore from around the world."

Earlier records from the duo were compared to the Nordic-folk sounds of Wardruna and Heilung. However, after 2020's Appalachia (named for the Appalachia region of the USA) they began to lean into more Anglo folk music traditions. "Appalachia, these hills, have a mythical and old calling to them," said Kratz when asked about the album in an interview. In 2021, Osi and the Jupiter put out their fourth release - Stave. The album title was inspired by galdrastafir, or Icelandic magical staves. Reviewers called the album "reflective, sorrowful, sage and soothing" and "an emotive and intriguing listen."
