= Drake Equation (album) =

Studio album by Tub Ring
- Released: June 12, 2001
- Recorded: 2001
- Genre: Avant-garde metal; experimental rock
- Length: 44:13
- Label: Invisible Records
- Producer: Trey Spruance

Tub Ring chronology
Super Sci-Fi Samurai Rockstar Ultra Turbo II (ver3.6) (1997)	Drake Equation (2001)	Fermi Paradox (2002)

Professional ratings
Review scores
Source	Rating
AllMusic	2.5/5 stars

Drake Equation is the debut studio album by American rock band Tub Ring, released on June 12, 2001, by Invisible Records. It was produced by Mr. Bungle guitarist Trey Spruance.

== Critical reception ==
Jeremy Salmon of AllMusic highlighted the album's eclectic style and frequent transitions, describing it as a "pastiche feeling not heard since Mr. Bungle's California. The album, which was produced by Mr. Bungle's guitarist Trey Spruance, features Kevin Gibson as a "near-soundalike" for Mike Patton.

Salmon noted that "Bernard's Three Awakenings" stands out for its shifts between "sweet, up-tempo pop-punk", "complete grindcore", and "spronky banjo and bouncy rhythm". He wrote that the album is well-suited for those "with short attention spans" due to its rapid changes in style, offering "fine material for fans waiting for the next Mr. Bungle masterpiece."

== Track listing ==
All tracks are written by Tub Ring.

Drake Equation track listing
No.	Title	Length
1.	"Where's the Robot?"	1:12
2.	"Bite the Wax Tadpole"	5:06
3.	"Faster"	3:44
4.	"Good Food: Happy Family"	4:03
5.	"Bernard's Three Awakenings"	1:59
6.	"Numbers"	4:59
7.	"Downloading Satan"	1:33
8.	"In the Future"	3:58
9.	"No More Refills"	4:23
10.	"She's the Pro"	3:00
11.	"God Hates Astronauts"	5:18
12.	"(hidden track)"	5:06
Total length:		44:13

== Personnel ==
- Kevin Gibson – vocals
- Rob Kleiner – keyboards
- Jason Fields – bass guitar
- Mike Gilmore – drums
- Mouse – guitar
- Dave Weiner – trumpet, backup vocals
- Dave Smith – saxophone, backup vocals
- Trey Spruance – additional guitars, keyboards, vocals and sleigh bells; producer, mixer
- Randy Herman – additional keyboards
- Mia Park – backup vocals
- Turon Yon – engineer
- Mike Casey – second engineer
- Rick Barnes – assistant engineer
- Chris Bauer – assistant engineer
- Josh Lopatin – assistant engineer
- Dan Steinman – assistant engineer for mixing
- George Horn – mastering
- Adam Bedore – album layout and design
- Jason Fields – album layout and design
