= Experiments in Alchemy =

Experiments In Alchemy

Studio album by Dog Fashion Disco
- Released: 1998; re-issued September 5, 2006
- Genres: Avant-garde metal, alternative metal
- Length: 28:15
- Labels: Self-released; Rotten Records
- Producers: Dog Fashion Disco, James Halsey

Dog Fashion Disco chronology
Erotic Massage (1997)	Experiments In Alchemy (1998)	The Embryo's in Bloom (1998)

2006 re-release
- The 2006 Rotten Records re-issue cover

Experiments In Alchemy is the second release by Dog Fashion Disco, originally self-released by the band in 1998. It was re-released by Rotten Records in 2006. As with DFD's succeeding album, Embryo's in Bloom, tracks 3–8 were later re-recorded and released on later albums.

== Track listing ==
No.	Title	Length
1.	"Siddhis"	3:25
2.	"Primate"	2:54
3.	"The Satanic Cowboy"	3:00
4.	"Pogo The Clown"	2:29
5.	"En La Noche"	3:40
6.	"Scores For Porn"	3:06
7.	"Albino Rhino"	2:51
8.	"9-5 At The Morgue"	4:03
9.	"Sexual Abyss"	2:43
Total length:		28:15

== Personnel ==
- Todd Smith – Vocals
- Sennen Quigley – Keyboards, Guitar
- Greg Combs – Guitar
- Mark Ammen – Bass
- John Ensminger – Drums, Percussion

=== Additional personnel ===
- Geoff Stewart – Alto/Tenor/Bari Sax
- Kristen Ensminger – Trumpet
- Pat Euler – Additional Percussion
- Dog Fashion Disco – Producer
- James Halsey – Co-Producer, Engineer
- Greg Jenkins – Co-Engineer
- Paul Minor – Mixing, Mastering
- Paul Campenella – Art Direction and Production
- Chris Ehrmann – Cover Photography
