= Rob Kleiner =

American songwriter and producer

- Born: Robert Francis Kleiner Jr.
- Origin: Park Ridge, Illinois, United States
- Genres: Indie rock, space rock, alternative rock, pop
- Occupations: Producer, mixing engineer, songwriter, musician
- Instruments: Piano, keyboards, organ, guitar, bass guitar, drums, percussion, synthesizer, melodica
- Years active: 1997–present
- Label: BMG
- Member of: Tub Ring, Super 8-Bit Brothers

Robert Francis Kleiner Jr., better known as Rob Kleiner, is an American songwriter and producer. Kleiner received degrees in music composition and philosophy at Eastern Illinois University. He went on to direct and score the film Andalusian Doug: Academic Freedom vs. Religious Conservatism, a documentary about the controversial teaching methods of his music professor, Douglas DiBianco. Between 1997 and 2011, he was a touring member of Tub Ring and Super 8-Bit Brothers, and an occasional fill-in for Mindless Self Indulgence.

== Discography ==
=== With Super 8-Bit Brothers ===
- First Level (2004)
- Melee (2006)
- Brawl (2010)
- Strife (2012)

=== Solo ===
- No Eyes (2005)
- Doctor Sleep (2006)
- Rob Kleiner and the Satanics (2010)

=== Soundtrack ===
- Working Class Rock Star (2008)
- Music from the Motion Picture Watch Out (2008)
- Stuck!: Original Music from the Motion Picture (2009)
- Andalusian Doug: Academic Freedom vs. Religious Conservatism (2010)
- The Collapsed (2011)
- The Casserole Club (2011)
- Culture Shock (2013)
- The Far Flung Star (2013)
- Skullworld (2013)
- Roundball (2014)

=== As producer/engineer ===
- Ideamen – May You Live in Interesting Times (2009) (mastering engineer)
- Secret Colours – Secret Colours (2010) (producer/recording and mastering engineer)
- Cee Lo Green – What Part of Forever from The Twilight Saga – Eclipse Original Motion Picture Soundtrack (2010) (songwriter/producer)
- David Guetta – Nothing but the Beat (2011) (engineer/vocal producer)
- Cee Lo Green – "(You're So Square) Baby, I Don't Care" from Rave on Buddy Holly (2011) (producer/musician)
- ZZ Ward – Eleven Roses (2011) (vocal producer/engineer/mix/master)
- Donnis – Southern Lights (2011) (engineer)
- Flo Rida – Wild Ones (2012) (vocal production/engineer)
- Chantal Claret – The Pleasure Seeker EP (2012) (songwriter/producer)
- Chantal Claret – The One, the Only... (2012) (songwriter/producer)
- ZZ Ward – Til the Casket Drops (2012) (vocal producer/engineer)
- Haley Reinhart – Listen Up! (2012) (songwriter/producer)
- Alessandra Amoroso – Amore Puro (2013) (songwriter)
- Sia featuring The Weeknd & Diplo – Elastic Heart from The Hunger Games: Catching Fire Original Motion Picture Soundtrack (2013) (vocal production/engineer)
- Britney Spears – Britney Jean (2013) (vocal engineer)
- Skyler Stonestreet – Timebomb Single (2013) (songwriter/producer)
- Kylie Minogue – Into the Blue Single (2014) (vocal producer/engineer)
- Candice Glover – Music Speaks (2014) (songwriter/producer)
- Sia – 1000 Forms of Fear (2014) (engineer/vocal production)
- Nikki Yanofsky – Little Secret (2014) (songwriter/producer)
- LP – Forever for Now (2014) (songwriter/producer)
- David Guetta – Listen (2014) (engineer/vocal production)
- Sasha – The One (2014) (songwriter/producer)
- Denai Moore – Elsewhere (2015) (producer/songwriter)
- Natalia Jiménez – Creo en Mi (2015) (producer/songwriter)
- Clairy Brown – Vanity Fair Single (2015) (producer/songwriter)
- Giorgio Moroder – Déjà Vu (2015) (vocal producer)
- Andra Day – Cheers to the Fall (2015) (producer/songwriter)
- Travie McCoy featuring Sia – Golden Single (2015) (vocal producer)
- Matt Nathanson – Show Me Your Fangs (2015) (producer/songwriter)
- MAX – Ms. Anonymous (2015) (producer)
- Haley Reinhart – Better (2016) (producer/songwriter)

=== Other appearances ===
- Mindless Self Indulgence – "(It's 3am) Issues (Tub Ring's Disco Edison Remix)" (2008)
- The Left Rights – "White (Crash and Burn Remix)" from Bad Choices Made Easy (2010)

== Awards ==
- Runner-up in MTV2's Dew Circuit Breakout (with Tub Ring)
- Tribecca Visionfest International Film Festival Best Original Score 2010 (Stuck!)
- Nominated Tribecca Visionfest International Film Festival Best Original Score 2011 (The Casserole Club)
- Tribecca Visionfest International Film Festival Best Original Score 2012 (Culture Shock)
- "What Part of Forever" by Cee Lo Green, from The Twilight Saga: Eclipse Original Motion Picture Soundtrack Certified Gold
- "Amore Puro" by Alessandra Amoroso Certified ITA 2× Platinum
- Listen by David Gueta Certified Gold
- Nothing but the Beat by David Guetta Certified UK 2× Platinum
- 2016 Latin Grammy for Best Producer (Creo En Mi by Natalia Jiménez)
