= Ideamen =

American rock band

- Origin: Chicago, Illinois, U.S.
- Genres: Art rock, alternative rock, avant-garde metal
- Years active: 2006–present
- Label: Rotten
- Members: Tim Swanson; Dave Solar; Mark Vasquez; Phil Miller; Phil Goodrich; Greg Millikan
- Past members: Dan Figurell

Ideamen is a rock band from Chicago, Illinois, formed in 2006.

== Biography ==
=== Beginnings (2006–2009) ===
Ideamen was created in late 2006 shortly after keyboardist Tim Swanson ended his short stint as keyboardist for Dog Fashion Disco and then teamed up with vocalist Dave Solar and bassist Mark Vasquez, following the dissolution of local Chicago-area bands Duct Tape Mustache and Soulvasq. Guitarist Jeff Piekarczyk and drummer Phil Goodrich rounded out the lineup, and in 2007, the band debuted with the release of their self-produced EP Progress. Piekarczyk left the band and guitarist Dan Figurell, formerly from the band Broken April, replaced him. The EP attracted the label Rotten Records (of whom Dog Fashion Disco was signed to when they dissolved), and Rotten signed Ideamen in 2008.

=== May You Live in Interesting Times and support touring (2008–2011) ===
In August 2008, Ideamen began working on their debut album. Their debut album, titled May You Live in Interesting Times, was released on October 27, 2009 on Rotten Records. A second guitarist, Phil Miller, joined the band in time for touring in October 2010. Throughout the next two years, the band toured with the likes of Polkadot Cadaver (which contains former fellow DFD members), Look What I Did, and Tub Ring.

=== Second album, Delays and release (2011–present) ===
A mash-up of the Mr. Bungle song "Retrovertigo" and Radiohead's "Paranoid Android" titled "RetroVertigoidAndroid" (a live favorite for the group), was recorded in the studio and released in early 2011 as a free download to anyone who signed up for the band's newsletter. The follow-up to Interesting Times had been given tentative release dates for as early as Spring of 2012. However, constant touring, Solar's bout with Ketoacidosis in fall of 2011, Goodrich's ear problems forcing him to take time off from touring, Figurell's relocation to Bloomington, and multiple issues with the final mix and mastering of the album all contributed to the extended delay of the album's release. Figurell ended his tenure with the band after recording his guitar parts for the album, and has been replaced by Greg Millikan. The album, titled Schemata, was released in February 2014. Swanson is once again a member of DFD.

== Members ==
Current Members

- Tim Swanson – Keyboards, Vocals (2006–present)
- Dave Solar – Vocals (2006–present)
- Mark Vasquez – Bass (2006–present)
- Phil Miller – Guitar, Vocals (2010–present)
- Greg Millikan – Guitar (2013–present)
- Phil Goodrich – Drums, Vocals (2006–present)

Former Members

- Jeff Piekarczyk - Guitar (2006-2008)
- Dan Figurell – Guitar (2008-2013)

== Discography ==
- Progress (EP) (2007)
- May You Live in Interesting Times (2009)
- Schemata (2014)
- Trained When We're Young (2017)
