= Adultery (Dog Fashion Disco album) =

Studio album by Dog Fashion Disco
- Released: April 4, 2006
- Recorded: August 2005 – January 2006
- Length: 50:28
- Label: Rotten
- Producer: Steve Wright

Dog Fashion Disco chronology
Committed to a Bright Future (2003)	Adultery (2006)	Sweet Nothings (2014)

Adultery is a concept album by Dog Fashion Disco, their sixth album, released in 2006, and last album to be released by the band before their dissolution in 2007. The album loosely follows the story of a private detective.

Professional ratings
Review scores
Source	Rating
Blabbermouth	8.5/10 stars
Invisible Oranges	(favorable)
Metal.de	10/10 stars

== Musical style ==
Blabbermouth said in a review of the album that Dog Fashion Disco "is genre-less and proud of it" and that it continued to showcase the band's distinctive "blend of strangely accessible hard rock, metal, punk, jazz [and] ska".

== Track listing ==
No.	Title	Length
1.	"The Uninvited Guest"	1:34
2.	"The Sacrifice Of Miss Rose Covington"	3:51
3.	"Silent Film"	3:08
4.	"Sweet Insanity"	4:28
5.	"Desert Grave"	3:23
6.	"Moonlight City Drive"	5:19
7.	"Private Eye"	3:40
8.	"The Darkest Days"	4:21
9.	"Dead Virgins Don't Sing"	4:21
10.	"The Hitchhiker"	4:38
11.	"100 Suicides"	3:53
12.	"Adultery"	5:02
13.	"Mature Audiences Only"	2:50
Total length:		50:28

== Background ==
After the band's deal with Artemis ended, drummer Mike "Ollie" Oliver left the band. This left Smith and Stepp to write most of the album on their own without a drummer. By chance, they asked former member John Ensminger to show up to drum for them; Ensminger then became the drummer on the album, completing the lineup. The music on the Adultery is still credited to every member of the band, as each member had their own input, specifically Matt Rippetoe, whose name is listed on the album cover with the rest of the band. Todd explains this as making up for leaving him off of the credits of their last album, Committed to a Bright Future.

== Supporting tour ==
In support of the album, DFD embarked on the "Conjugal Visitors Tour" with Bad Acid Trip and Tub Ring supporting. Keyboardist Jeff Siegel was absent from this tour; instead, his position was filled by Tim Swanson. Also, since Rotten Records was a considerably smaller label than Atremis, the venues booked for the tour were far smaller. Morale among the band was rather low. The shrinking tour size and low morale factored considerably to the band's decision to disband following the tour.

== Vinyl release ==
For the band's 2011 reunion shows, the album was released on vinyl by Rotten Records. This press of the album is across two vinyl records and is limited to 1000 copies.

== Credits ==
=== Dog Fashion Disco ===
- Todd Smith - Vocals, Guitar, Banjo
- Jasan Stepp - Guitar, Cello, Keyboards
- Jeff Siegel - Keyboards
- Brian White - Bass
- John Ensminger - Drums

=== Additional musicians ===
- Matt Rippetoe - Saxophones, Flute, Clarinet and Horn Arrangements
- Joe Brotherton - Trumpet
- Brandon Rivera - Trombone

=== Additional personnel ===
- Steve Wright - Engineer, Producer, Mixing
- Drew Lamonde - Assistant Engineer, Pre-Production
- Tom Baker - Mastering at Precision Mastering
- Cory Cudney - Album Artwork
- Shane Tuttle - Layout And Design
- Derek Brewer - Management at OuterLoop Management
- Jeff Cohen - Legal
