= Venomin James =

American doom metal band

- Origin: Cleveland, Ohio, U.S.
- Genres: Doom metal, heavy metal
- Years active: 2005–present
- Labels: Kultland Recordings, Auburn Records
- Members: Mike Martini; Tomasz Scull; Joe Fortunato
- Past members: Jared Koston; Jim Meador; Erin Corcoran; Eric Matthews

Venomin James is an American doom metal band formed in Kirtland, Ohio, United States, in 2005.

== Left Hand Man era (2005–2007) ==
Venomin James was formed in late 2005 with Tomasz Scull, Erin Corcoran, and Joe Fortunato beginning to write songs while actively searching for a drummer and vocalist to complete the lineup. This core trio recorded a series of demos with Night Sweats/Living Stereo/Sidecar frontman Brandon Abate on drums, to hand out to prospective members. Early in 2006, vocalist Jim Meador was added to the lineup, and the band began playing Cleveland area shows with Abate filling in on drums. Drummer Jared Koston was recruited in June 2006, and the band played a number of live dates to hone and complete their material. The band recorded their first full-length album Left Hand Man throughout late 2006 and 2007, released on Kultland Recordings on September 18, 2007. Mastering was handled by Alan Douches (Mastodon, Converge, The Misfits) of West West Side Music in New Jersey.

The album garnered the band some attention among the underground doom, metal, and stoner rock scenes, as well as radio play from local KROQ-FM affiliate 92.3. College radio picked up on the band's retro/doom/metal sound, and college stations across the country began playing the album in moderate rotation. Local college radio personality, and creator of the respected "Metal On Metal" show, Bill Peters of WJCU 88.7FM, began playing the album on his show, starting a friendship with the band that would help begin their move toward the next level in the coming years. Bill Peters is also the president of Auburn Records, a record label based in Medina, Ohio, that has released albums from Shok Paris, Breaker, Destructor, and Purgatory.

== Crowe Valley Blues era (2007–2010) ==
Immediately after the release of Left Hand Man, the band finished writing and recording the follow-up album, Crowe Valley Blues. In the fall of 2008 local Parma, Ohio businessman and club owner, Phil Lara, promised financial backing for tour support and the recording and release of Crowe Valley Blues. When this deal fell through in a Cleveland scene-wide scandal, the release of Crowe Valley Blues was put on hold indefinitely. With Lara's deal broken, the band was unable to fund the mastering of the album, again by Alan Douches.

At this point, Bill Peters stepped in, and offered to release Crowe Valley Blues on Auburn Records. Peters financed the mastering and manufacturing of the album, and secured worldwide distribution. Crowe Valley Blues was released in Europe in July 2010, with a US release following on September 14, 2010. The Auburn release of Crowe Valley Blues included the Death's Wings EP as a bonus, containing remixes, demos, and outtakes from Left Hand Man-era sessions, as a thanks to fans who had patiently waited for the album's release. Videos were filmed for the singles "Cosmonaut" and "Make No Mistake".

Reactions to the album have been positive, building upon the respect of the underground doom, stoner rock, and metal communities.

Crowe Valley Blues made Apple iTunes' "Best Metal Albums" of 2010, and Venomin James was named one of iTunes' "Best New Metal Artists" of 2010.

== Death of Jared Koston (2010) ==
Early in 2005, Koston was diagnosed with Stage III Melanoma, which was removed from his left shoulder. A small tumor returned in 2008, and Koston again underwent surgery. In the spring of 2009, Koston again noticed a growth in his left shoulder, this time diagnosed with Stage IV Cancer stemming from melanoma. The previous surgeries had not been successful in removing all the cancerous cells. From the summer of 2009 until late spring of 2010, Koston received chemotherapy as well as radiation therapy. Early in 2010, doctors discovered that the cancer had spread to his liver, bones, and into his brain. The metal community worldwide rallied around Koston, sending messages of support, and financial assistance for his medical treatment.

Despite ongoing treatments, Jared Koston died on 1 June 2010.

== Unholy Mountain era (2010–2013) ==
Following the death of Koston, the band again recruited Brandon Abate to drum for a few live shows to support the release of Crowe Valley Blues. In October 2010, the band was approached by drummer Eric Matthews (Pro-Pain, The Spudmonsters, Red Giant, Years of Fire, The Great Iron Snake) to become Venomin James' touring/live drummer. Throughout the end of 2010, and into 2011, the band played a series of shows with Matthews to support Crowe Valley Blues, and in preparation of their appearance at the 2011 Wacken Open Air Festival in Germany.

Venomin James performed at the Wacken Open Air Festival at 12:15AM, on 6 August 2011 to a crowd of approximately 8,500 on the W.E.T. Stage.

Beginning in the summer of 2010, the band sifted through all the demo recording sessions for their third album, Unholy Mountain. Through this process, the band determined that the audio fidelity of the multitracked drums would allow for the last recorded performances of former drummer Jared Koston to be used in the creation of the new album. The band commenced recording throughout the end of 2010 and well into early 2012. Unholy Mountain was originally scheduled for release via Auburn Records sometime in Q3 of 2013, but funding was lost and the album was put on hold. The album features collaborations with several notable Cleveland-area musicians, including James Bulloch of Ringworm, Damien Perry of Red Giant and The Great Iron Snake, and Gary Kane of Forged In Flame.

In December 2012, Venomin James parted ways with founding vocalist, Jim Meador. The band stated that they wanted a change in vocal direction, and would continue writing material for an unnamed 4th release.

On July 23, 2013, the band released a new single, "Sailor's Grave", featuring new vocalist Mike Martini.

December 13, 2013, the band released another single, "33rd Degree" to all digital outlets.

== Wake The Dead and Unholy Mountain (2013–2017) ==
The band released the Wake The Dead album digitally via BandCamp in November 2014. The album also became available via major digital outlets like Apple's iTunes, Spotify, and Amazon Music on February 17, 2015. All previous digital singles from 2013 were remixed and new tracks "Wake the Dead", "Slow Decay", and "Ghosts of Yesterday" were added. The BandCamp version includes the original 2013 single mixes as bonus tracks. The album became available on CD December 21, 2015.

The band announced in early 2014 that plans were underway to finally release Unholy Mountain as a deluxe 2-CD edition: First disc containing the original mixes with former vocalist Jim Meador, and a second disc containing instrumental mixes, similar to what Mastodon had done with the score version of "Crack The Skye". The album was finally released on July 14, 2017 via the band's own label on a single disc with bonus tracks, as well as being distributed through most major online music services.

Erin Corcoran left the band in December 2018.

== Recent Activity (2020 to Date) ==
Several former members began writing and rehearsing as a new project entitled "Crow Valley" during the COVID pandemic lockdown, featuring a similar downtuned doom metal style. No release has been announced as of yet. The Crow Valley page on Facebook has listed 4 songs as being written and demoed.

In November 2023, the band stated on social media that plans are underway to remix and re-release both "Left Hand Man" and "Unholy Mountain", with some mixing work already completed. In addition to remix activities, the band has begun releasing various demos and live tracks via their BandCamp site, beginning with "Live at Rock City Tap House April 26, 2013" released on 4 November 2023.

== Band members ==
=== Current members ===
- Joe Fortunato – guitar (2005–present)
- Tomasz Scull – guitar (2005–present)
- Mike Martini – vocals (2013–present)

=== Former members ===
- Jared Koston – drums (2006–2010) (deceased)
- Jim Meador – vocals (2006–2012)
- Erin Corcoran – bass (2005–2018)
- Eric Matthews – drums (2010–2020)

=== Touring members ===
- Brandon Abate – drums (2010)

== Discography ==
| Release | Label | Year |
|---|---|---|
| Summer of Horror EP | Kultland Recordings | 2006 |
| Left Hand Man LP | Kultland Recordings | 2007 |
| Crowe Valley Blues LP/ Death's Wings EP | Auburn Records | 2010 |
| "Sailor's Grave" Digital Single | Auburn Records | 2013 |
| "33rd Degree" Digital Single | Auburn Records | 2013 |
| Wake The Dead | Kultland Recordings | 2015 |
| Unholy Mountain | Kultland Recordings | 2017 |
| Live at Rock City Tap House April 26, 2013 | Kultland Recordings | 2023 |

=== Compilation albums ===
| Title | Track | Released by | Year |
|---|---|---|---|
| Blowin' Smoke | "Desert Rider" | Stoner Rock Ohio | 2010 |
| Monuments of Steel II | "Cosmonaut" | Hard Rocker Magazine, Issue #17 | 2010 |
| The Soda Shop Comp Vol. 1 | "Cosmonaut" | The Soda Shop | 2011 |
| The Soda Shop Comp Vol. 3 | "Unholy Mountain" | The Soda Shop | 2012 |
| The Ripple Effect Presents: Volume 1 - Head Music | "Seven Years" | Ripple Music | 2012 |
