= Forged in Flame =

American heavy metal and rock band

- Origin: Cleveland, Ohio, U.S.
- Genres: Heavy metal, rock
- Years active: 2007–present
- Labels: Unsigned
- Members: Gary Kane; Jay Bonnel; Cyril Blandino; Jon Vinson
- Past members: Jason Shaffer; Justin Haberer; Chris Konowal; Jay Christner; Jason Clark

Forged in Flame is a heavy metal/rock band formed in Cleveland, Ohio, United States, in 2007. The band has often been described as stoner rock. The band's signature is a prog-doom-metal with a vintage Sabbath chaser. The band has self-released a four song EP “Forged In Flame” which has sold close to 1,000 copies, and a vinyl 7” split "Forged In Ohio" with The Ohio Sky. More recently they contributed exclusive song “The Underground” for Australian label Planet Fuzz Record’s compilation Cowbells and Cobwebs. The band has been compared to acts such as Corrosion of Conformity, the Cult and Life of Agony. The band is not currently signed to any label.

== Members ==
=== Current ===
- Gary Kane – Vocals
- Scott Young – Guitar
- Cyril Blandino - Guitar
- Justin Meyers - Bass
- Jon Vinson - Drums

=== Former members ===
- Jay Bonnell - Guitar
- Jason Shaffer - Guitar
- Justin Haberer - Guitar
- Chris Konowal - Bass
- Jay Christner - Guitar
- Jason Clark - Bass Guitar

== Select discography ==
- "Forged in Flame" EP, 2008
- "Cowbells and Cobwebs" – PlanetFuzz Records Compilation, 2010
- "Forged in Ohio" EP, Vinyl 7" split w/The Ohio Sky, 2010

== Related projects ==
- Axioma
