= Polkadot Cadaver =

American metal band

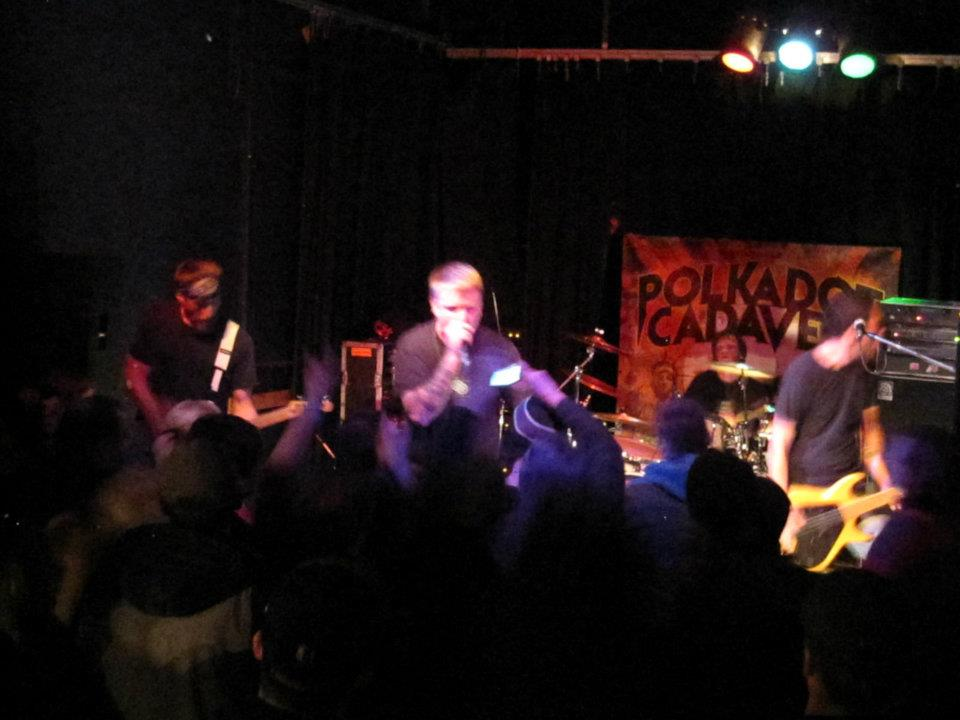
- Polkadot Cadaver live in 2012

Background information
- Origin: Rockville, Maryland, U.S.
- Genres: Avant-garde metal, alternative metal, experimental rock
- Years active: 2007–present
- Labels: Rotten, Razor to Wrist
- Spinoff of: Dog Fashion Disco
- Members: Todd Smith; Jasan Stepp; Brian White; John Ensminger; Alex Crowley
- Past members: Mike Oliver; David Cullen; Scott Radway; Mike Smirnoff

Polkadot Cadaver is an American avant-garde/alternative metal band from Rockville, Maryland, formed in 2007 by members of Dog Fashion Disco. The band is stylistically similar to Dog Fashion Disco and inherited many of their fans.

== History ==
=== Inception and Purgatory Dance Party ===
Polkadot Cadaver formed shortly after the breakup of Dog Fashion Disco in 2007. Their debut album, Purgatory Dance Party, was released via internet pre-sales on November 17, 2007, with a street date of November 27, 2007. Two Polkadot Cadaver demos were featured on the Dog Fashion Disco rarities album, Beating a Dead Horse to Death... Again in 2008. During the tours for Purgatory Dance Party, Dave Cullen was brought on as the band's full-time bassist, and in 2010, Scott Radway became the full-time live drummer.

=== Sex Offender and subsequent tours ===
On May 5, 2011, Polkadot Cadaver debuted at No. 17 on the Billboard New Artist Chart (aka Heatseekers Chart) with their second album Sex Offender. This album was the first to include bassist David Cullen (also of Knives Out!), though Ensminger still played drums on the album. In support of the album, they toured with Wednesday 13, Vampires Everywhere! and Korpiklaani. In January 2012, they toured as main support for Wayne Static, and in April began the Fight to Unite Tour in support of Brokencyde and Blood on the Dance Floor with other supporting acts including Deuce, William Control, and The Bunny the Bear.

=== Last Call in Jonestown and Christmas EP ===
On July 17, 2012, the band uploaded a picture to their official Facebook page, announcing a new album to be released in 2013 and that fellow Maryland-based rock band Clutch's lead singer Neil Fallon is to appear on a track titled "Transistors of Mercy". Additionally, drummer Scott Radway is present in the picture as a full-time member of the band (he had toured with the band since 2010). The band announced in December that the album would be released in April 2013 and a tour will follow. In early January 2013, it was revealed through the band's Facebook that the new album would be called Last Call in Jonestown and was scheduled for release on May 7. However, the release date ended up being pushed back to May 14. On March 23, the band began the "Our Tour Can Beat Up Your Tour" tour supporting Psychostick alongside Downtown Brown.

Dave Cullen quit the band before the album was completed, contributing on only two songs. Former Dog Fashion Disco bassist Brian White replaced Dave Cullen for the tour and has stuck with the band since. In support of the album, the band began their "Last Call in Jonestown 2013 Tour" on June 14, supported by One-Eyed Doll and Exotic Animal Petting Zoo. It is the first tour the band has headlined in over two years.

The band began recording a Christmas EP in early September 2013, titled From Bethlehem to Oblivion. The artwork was released on September 5, and pre-orders began October 31. In addition, Last Call in Jonestown was released on colored vinyl in a limited run of 500 copies.

In April 2014, Scott Radway left the band. Former DFD drummer Mike Oliver joined the band in his place, but since leaving DFD in August 2015, he has had no contact with vocalist Todd Smith, indicating that he is no longer a member of Polkadot Cadaver as well. Former drummer John Ensminger is set to drum on the next Polkadot Cadaver album.

=== Get Possessed ===
The band released their fourth album, Get Possessed, on November 17, 2017. The record release party for the album was held at The Agora in Cleveland on November 4, 2017.

=== Purgatory Dance Party ===
The 2007 debut album Purgatory Dance Party was re-recorded in 2020 and released by Razor to Wrist. The band did not own the recordings of the original album and the record company doing that was not interested in making a new release. The group's other band Dog Fashion Disco did a similar thing with their albums Anarchists of Good Taste and Committed to a Bright Future.

=== Echoes Across the Hellscape ===
Echoes Across the Hellscape is the band's fifth album, released on December 8, 2023

== Members ==
Current members

- Todd Smith — vocals, guitar (2007–present)
- Jasan Stepp — guitar, keyboards, programming (2007–present), bass (2007–2008, 2013)
- Brian "Wendy" White — bass (2013–present)
- John Ensminger — drums (2007–2010, 2015–2022); studio only (2010–2011, 2022–present)

Current touring musicians

- Alex Crowley — drums (2008, 2022–Present)

Former members

- Mike Oliver — drums (2014–2015)
- David Cullen — bass (2008–2013)
- Scott Radway — drums (2010–2014)
- Mike Smirnoff — drums (2014)

== Discography ==
Year	Album details	Chart peaks
Year	Album details	Heatseeker
2007	Purgatory Dance Party: Released: November 27, 2007; Label: Rotten	-
2010	Wolf in Jesus Skin/Horse's Head (split 7-inch w/ Ideamen): Released: 2010; Label: Rotten	-
2011	Sex Offender: Released: May 10, 2011; Label: Rotten	17
2013	Last Call in Jonestown: Released: May 14, 2013; Label: Razor to Wrist	38
2013	From Bethlehem to Oblivion EP: Released: December 10, 2013; Label: Razor to Wrist	-
2017	Get Possessed: Released: November 17, 2017; Label: Razor to Wrist	-
2020	Purgatory Dance Party: Released: July 10, 2020; Label: Razor to Wrist; Re-recording of the 2007 album	-
2023	Echoes Across The Hellscape: Released: December 8, 2023; Label: Razor to Wrist	-
"—" denotes a release that did not chart.

== Music videos ==
March 2008 saw the release of the band's first two videos, "Chloroform Girl" and "Pure Bedlam for Halfbreeds", which are available on the band's official MySpace page. Both videos were directed by Dan Edwards. A video has also been produced for "Bring Me the Head of Andy Warhol", which was available on YouTube but has been deleted. Once the band was held under Razor to Wrist Records, they produced more music videos for older and newer songs such as "Last Call in Jonestown", "12 days of Christmas, repent!", "Get Possessed", "Emotional Creatures", etc. All of these can be found under the Razor to Wrist Records official YouTube channel.
