= Fractured Transmitter Recording Company =

- Founded: 2004
- Founder: Jason Popson
- Genre: Heavy metal, hardcore punk, extreme metal
- Country of origin: United States

Fractured Transmitter was a record company started by Jason Popson around the time he departed from Mushroomhead in 2004.

Former logo

== Bands signed ==
- Pitch Black Forecast
- The Alter Boys
- American Werewolves
- Asleep
- Disengage
- Integrity
- Jeff Walker
- Meshuggah
- State of Conviction
- Bitch Wrangler

== See also ==
- Jason Popson
