= Tub Ring =

Rock band

- Origin: Chicago, Illinois, United States
- Genres: Experimental rock; alternative rock; punk rock (early)
- Years active: 1992–2010, 2016-present
- Labels: Invisible Records, The End
- Members: Kevin Gibson; Rob Kleiner
- Past members: Trevor Erb; Chris Wiken; Jeff Enokian; Jason Fields; Shawn Sprinkel; Dave Tavares; Mike Gilmore; Scott Radway; Chris Blake; Geoff Valker

Tub Ring is a Chicago-based rock band formed in 1992 by Jason Fields, Kevin Gibson, Chris "Mouse" Blake, and Geoff Valker.

== Biography ==
Tub Ring was formed in 1992 by Jason Fields, Kevin Gibson, Chris "Mouse" Blake, and Geoff Valker as a high school experimental rock band. After the passing of their manager, Lee Swanson in 1994, the lineup changed with the addition of keyboardist Rob Kleiner. Mr. Bungle guitarist Trey Spruance produced Tub Ring's first official full-length album, Drake Equation. On December 10, 2005, Tub Ring came in second place during MTV2's "Dew Circuit Breakout" competition. Tub Ring performed two songs throughout the competition, "Future Was Free" and a cover of Justin Timberlake's "Rock Your Body".

On October 17, 2006, it was announced on the experimental metal/rock record label The End Records's official website that the band had signed with them. The band released their album, The Great Filter, in May 2007. On August 31, 2010, Tub Ring released their fifth studio album, Secret Handshakes. On October 31, 2016, an announcement was made on the Tub Ring Facebook page that they would be releasing a best-of album and a brand new EP in May 2017 backed by a Kickstarter campaign. On November 2, the Kickstarter goal had been reached, and the band later confirmed that they would release a new full-length album instead of an EP. The album, titled A Choice of Catastrophes, was released on September 8, 2017.

== Touring ==
Tub Ring are known for their energetic stage shows. The band has toured frequently over the years and have shared the stage with acts such as: Pigface, Sleepytime Gorilla Museum, The Birthday Massacre, Foxy Shazam, Clutch, Mindless Self Indulgence, Dog Fashion Disco, Framing Hanley, Black Light Burns, Horse the Band, Plain White T's, Kill Hannah, Wesley Willis, and more.

In January 2008, the band was invited to perform at the Sundance Film Festival as part of a Green Initiative sponsored event. On a tour in 2008, Darren Keen played second guitar for an impromptu set with Tub Ring in Houston, Texas. Later that year, while on tour with Mindless Self Indulgence, the band recruited Curtis Rx of the band Creature Feature to also play second guitar for a select portion of dates. The 2010 tour for the album Secret Handshakes included Patrik Windsor on guitar and Sean Motley on drums.

== Side/related projects ==
- Super 8-Bit Brothers
- 3-2-1 Activate!
- Edison's Arm
- Pum
- The Pastries
- Deli Meat and the French Eroticas
- Sex & Violets
- Ideamen
- Now Soon Nowhere
- Hunab Ku

== Rob Kleiner solo ==
In 2005, Rob Kleiner released his first solo album, No Eyes. On February 13, 2007, he released his second, and latest solo EP, Doctor Sleep. He is also a part of video game rock duo Super 8 Bit Brothers. In addition to his solo work, he's one of the main contributing members of Edison's Arm, and has scored several films, including Ending The Eternal, the feature documentary Working Class Rock Star, and Steve Balderson's films Watch Out as well as Stuck!.

== Discography ==
=== Studio albums ===
- Drake Equation (2001)
- Fermi Paradox (2002)
- Zoo Hypothesis (2004)
- The Great Filter (2007)
- Secret Handshakes (2010)
- A Choice of Catastrophes (2017)
- Last and First Men (2024)
- The State of the Art (2026)

=== Demo albums ===
- Stupid Pet Tricks (1992)
- Music for the Bathroom (1993)
- ...And the Mashed Potato Mountain Etiquette (1995)
- Super Sci-Fi Samurai Rockstar Ultra Turbo II (ver3.6) (1997)

=== Compilations ===
- Book of Water (2001)
- Optics and Sonics (2005)
- The Best of Tub Ring: Polyvinyl Chloride (2017)
