= DFDVD =

Video by Dog Fashion Disco
- Released: July 2004
- Recorded: Early 2004
- Length: 1:59:00
- Label: OuterLoop Records; Razor To Wrist Records
- Producer: Unstable Ground, Inc.

Dog Fashion Disco chronology
DFDVD (2004)	DFD-Day (2005)

DFDVD is the first DVD by Dog Fashion Disco released in July 2004. It includes two hours of footage following the band and their exploits on the road through various steps of their career, from early lineups to current. Also included are all their music videos, an entire live set shot in Toronto, Ontario, Canada, a collection of bonus live videos and the making of the "Grease" video. It was out of print, very rare and costly to get a hold of for over seven years, but was re-released on the band's label Razor to Wrist Records in 2012. Creation of the "DFDVD" partially inspired the production of the documentary "Working Class Rock Star".

== Track listing ==
=== Live in Toronto ===
1. "Worm in a Dog's Heart"
2. "Leper Friend"
3. "Baby Satan"
4. "Albino Rhino"
5. "A Corpse is a Corpse"

=== Music Videos ===
6. "Leper Friend"
7. "Nude in the Wilderness"
8. "Grease
9. "The Acid Memoirs"
10. "Antiquity's Small Rewards"
11. "Rat on a Sinking Ship" (UVTV)
12. "Love Song for a Witch" (UVTV)
13. "Nude in the Wilderness" (UVTV)

=== Bonus Live Footage ===
14. "Baby Satan"
15. "Vertigo Motel"
16. "Pink Riots"

=== Additional Live in Toronto Footage ===
17. "Dr. Piranha"
18. "Day of the Dead"
19. "Love Song for a Witch"
20. "Rat on a Sinking Ship"

== Bonus Features ==
- Early DFD
- On the Road
- In Studio
- Thanksgiving With DFD
- Making of "Grease"
- "Albino Rhino"
- Slideshow
- Photo Gallery
- Band Bio
- DVD Trailer

== Credits ==
- Todd Smith - Vocals
- Jasan Stepp - Guitar
- Greg Combs - guitar (former)
- Jeff Siegel - Keyboards
- Brian "Wendy" White - Bass
- Steve Mears - bass (former)
- Mike "Ollie" Oliver - Drums
- John Ensminger - drums (former)
- Derek Brewer - Management
- Jeff Cohen, Esq. - Legal
- Justin McConnell - Art Direction & Design
- Mike Kelley - Booking
- Unstable Ground - DVD production company
- Justin McConnell - DVD author/director
- Tom Gregg - cameraman
- Greg Sommer - cameraman
- Dylan Harrison - cameraman
- Felipe Rodrigues - cameraman
- Kevin Hutchinson - cameraman
- Nathan Roberts - cameraman (9:30 Club footage; uncredited)
- Carlos Batts - director (Leper Friend, Nude in the Wilderness)
