= Greatest Hymns =

Studio album by Selah
- Released: August 25, 2005
- Genres: Contemporary Christian music, Christmas music
- Length: 63:23
- Label: Curb
- Producers: Jason Kyle; Allan Hall; Todd Smith; Nicol Sponberg

Selah chronology
Hiding Place (2004)	Greatest Hymns (2005)	Bless the Broken Road: The Duets Album (2006)

Greatest Hymns is the fifth studio album from the Contemporary Christian group Selah. It was released August 25, 2005 on Curb Records. The album contains renditions of classic Christian hymns.

== Track listing ==
No.	Title	Writer(s)	Length
1.	"Be Thou My Vision"	Eleanor Hull	3:17
2.	"Great Is Thy Faithfulness"	Thomas Chisholm; William M. Runyan	5:38
3.	"Bika Mono Ve (Pass Me Not, O Gentle Savior) / It Is Well with My Soul"	Francis J. Crosby; William H. Doane / Horatio Spafford; Philip Bliss	5:42
4.	"There Is a Fountain"	William Cowper; Lowell Mason	4:02
5.	"Amazing Grace"	John Newton	3:27
6.	"How Great Thou Art"	Carl Boberg; Stuart K. Hine	6:13
7.	"His Eye Is on the Sparrow"	Charles H. Gabriel; Civilla D. Martin	3:43
8.	"Be Still My Soul / What a Friend We Have in Jesus"	Catharina von Schlegel; Jane Laurie Borthwick / Joseph M. Scriven; Charles C. Converse	3:57
9.	"By and By (We'll Understand It Better By and By)"	Jim Smith; Marcella Smith; Todd Smith; Charles Albert Tindley	3:33
10.	"When I Survey the Wondrous Cross"	Isaac Watts	4:03
11.	"Part the Waters / I Need Thee Every Hour"	Annie Hawks; Robert Lowry	3:12
12.	"Precious Lord, Take My Hand / Just a Closer Walk with Thee"	Thomas A. Dorsey / Traditional	5:09
13.	"There is Power in the Blood"	Lewis Jones	3:08
14.	"O Sacred Head Now Wounded"	Bernard of Clairvaux; Hans Leo Hassler	4:47
15.	"Be Thou Near to Me"	David Grow	3:32
Total length:			63:23

== Personnel ==
Selah

- Allan Hall – vocals (1), acoustic piano (1–8, 10–13), arrangements (1, 3–5, 7, 8, 10–14), backing vocals (4)
- Todd Smith – vocals, arrangements (1, 3–5, 7, 9, 12–14)
- Nicol Sponberg – vocals, arrangements (1, 3–5, 7, 8, 10–14)

Musicians and Vocalists

- Chris Leiber – Hammond B3 organ (5)
- Gordon Mote – organ (13)
- John Andrew Schreiner – arrangements (13), keyboards (14)
- Jim Brickman – acoustic piano (15)
- David Grow – keyboards (15), programming (15), percussion (15)
- Chris Rodriguez – guitars (2, 3)
- Mark Pay – guitars (5)
- Jakk Kinkaid – electric guitar (13)
- Jerry McPherson – electric guitar (13)
- Biff Watson – acoustic guitar (13)
- Shawn Tubbs – guitars (14)
- Bruce Watson – electric guitar (15)
- Jorgen Carlsson – guitar (15), bass (15)
- Randy Melson – bass (5)
- David Hungate – bass (13)
- Dane Clark – drums (5)
- Steve Brewster – drums (13)
- Eric Eldenius – drums (15)
- Eric Darken – percussion (1, 9, 13)
- John Mock – tin whistle (1)
- Sarighani Reist – cello (1)
- Kristin Wilkinson – viola (1)
- David Angell – first violin (1)
- Pamela Sixfin – second violin (1)
- The Nashville String Machine – strings (7, 8)
- Paul Mills – string arrangements (1, 4, 7, 8, 11)
- David Maddux – arrangements (10)
- Jason Kyle – backing vocals (6)
- Jim Smith – lead vocals on second verse (9)
- Laban Smith – speaking intro (9)
- Vicki Hampton – choir (13)
- Wendy Moten – choir (13)
- Ken "Scat" Springs – choir (13)
- Melodie Crittenden – vocals (15)
- Windy Wagner – backing vocals (15)

Strings on Track 4

- David Angell, Monisa Angell, Janet Askey, John Catchings, Jim Grosjean, Cate Myer, Carole Rabinowitz, Pamela Sixfin, Christian Teal, Catherine Umstead, Gary Vanosdale and Karen Winklemann – string players

Strings on Track 11

- Anthony LaMarchina, Bob Mason and Sarighani Reist – cello
- Monisa Angell, Jim Grosjean and Kristin Wilkinson – viola
- David Angell, Conni Ellisor, Cate Myer, Pamela Sixfin, Christian Teal, Alan Umstead, Catherine Umstead and Mary Kathryn Vanosdale – violin

=== Production ===
- Bryan Stewart – A&R
- Allan Hall – producer (1–14)
- Todd Smith – producer (1–14)
- Nicol Sponberg – producer (1, 4–6, 9, 11, 13, 14)
- Jason Kyle – producer (1–13), tracking engineer (1, 9, 11, 13), mixing (1, 9, 11, 13), assistant string engineer (1), engineer (2, 3, 7, 8, 10, 12),
- David Grow – producer (15), mixing (15)
- Craig White – tracking engineer (1, 9, 11, 13), string engineer (1, 11)
- Mark Lambert – mixing (1, 9, 11, 13), string engineer (4)
- Doug Beiden – tracking engineer (14)
- Ryan Lynn – assistant engineer (1, 9, 11, 13)
- Greg Strizek – assistant engineer (1, 9, 11, 13)
- John Thompson – assistant engineer (1, 9, 11, 13)
- Jeff Aebi – assistant engineer (5)
- Jeff Pitzer – assistant engineer (7, 8)
- Aaron Bowlin – mastering
- Glenn Sweitzer – art direction, design
- Brian Jannsen – management

== Awards ==
At the 37th GMA Dove Awards, the album was nominated for Inspirational Album of the Year. Two songs from the album were also nominated for awards. "Be Thou My Vision" was nominated for Worship Song of the Year and "All My Praise" was nominated for Inspirational Recorded Song of the Year.

== Charts ==
Chart (2005)	Peak position
US Billboard 200	117
US Top Christian Albums	3

== Certifications ==
Region	Certification	Certified units/sales
United States (RIAA)	Gold	500,000^{‡}
^{‡} Sales+streaming figures based on certification alone.
