= Hiding Place (Selah album) =

Studio album by Selah
- Released: 25 May 2004
- Studios: Room With A View Studios and Curb Studios (Nashville, Tennessee); Dark Horse Recording Studios (Franklin, Tennessee)
- Genre: Contemporary Christian music
- Length: 58:03
- Label: Curb
- Producers: Morten Schjolin; Allan Hall; Todd Smith; Nicol Sponberg; Jason Kyle

Selah chronology
Rose of Bethlehem (2002)	Hiding Place (2004)	Greatest Hymns (2005)

Professional ratings
Review scores
Source	Rating
AllMusic	3/5 stars

Hiding Place is an album from contemporary Christian group Selah. It was released in 2004.

== Track listing ==
1. "You Raise Me Up" (Brendan Graham, Rolf Løvland) – 5:02
2. "Part the Waters Lord"/"I Need Thee Every Hour" (Charles F. Brown, Annie S. Hawks, Robert Lowry) – 3:09
3. "I Bless Your Name" (Wayne Goodine) – 3:50
4. "Esengo" – 4:22
5. "All My Praise" (Audrey Hatcher) – 4:37
6. "There Is Power in the Blood" (Lewis Jones) – 3:06
7. "You Are My Hiding Place" (Michael Ledner) – 4:21
8. "Through It All" (Andraé Crouch) – 2:49
9. "By and By (We'll Understand It Better By and By)" (Jim Smith, Marcella Smith, Todd Smith, Charles Tindley) – 3:28
10. "O the Deep, Deep Love of Jesus" (Samuel Francis, Thomas Williams) – 6:13
11. "All of Me" (Terry Wade Haynes) – 2:58
12. "Before the Throne of God Above" (Charitie Bancroft, Vikki Cook) – 3:43

== Personnel ==
Selah

- Allan Hall – lead vocals (1, 3, 5, 8, 12), backing vocals, acoustic piano (2, 3, 5–8, 10–12), arrangements (2, 6, 10)
- Todd Smith – lead vocals (1, 3–12), backing vocals, arrangements (4, 6, 9, 10)
- Nicol Sponberg – lead vocals (1–8, 10, 12), backing vocals, arrangements (2, 4, 6, 10)

Musicians

- Morten Schjolin – keyboards (1), programming (1), drums (1), percussion (1)
- Gordon Mote – organ (3, 6, 8), keyboards (10)
- Jakk Kincaid – electric guitar (3–6, 8, 10)
- Jerry McPherson – electric guitar (3–6, 8, 10)
- Biff Watson – acoustic guitar (3–6, 8, 10), mandocello (4)
- David Hungate – bass (3–6, 8, 10)
- Steve Brewster – drums (3–6, 8, 10)
- Eric Darken – percussion (3–9, 11, 12)
- John Mock – tin whistle (12)
- James Halliwell – string arrangements (1)
- Paul Mills – string arrangements (2, 7, 11, 12)
- Anthony LaMarchina – cello (2, 7, 11)
- Bob Mason – cello (2, 7, 11)
- Sarighani Reist – cello (2, 7, 11, 12)
- Monisa Angell – viola (2, 7, 11)
- Jim Grosjean – viola (2, 7, 11)
- Kristin Wilkinson – viola (2, 7, 11, 12)
- David Angell – violin (2, 7, 11), concertmaster (2, 7, 11), first violin (12)
- Conni Ellisor – violin (2, 7, 11)
- Cate Myer – violin (2, 7, 11)
- Pamela Sixfin – violin (2, 7, 11), second violin (12)
- Christian Teal – violin (2, 7, 11)
- Alan Umstead – violin (2, 7, 11)
- Catherine Umstead – violin (2, 7, 11)
- Mary Kathryn Vanosdale – violin (2, 7, 11)
- Kim Fleming – choir vocals (1)
- Vicki Hampton – choir vocals (1, 3, 6, 8)
- Scat Springs – choir vocals (1, 3, 6, 8)
- Wendy Moten – choir vocals (3, 6, 8)
- Abby Smith – backing vocals (4)
- Angie Smith – backing vocals (4)
- Ellie Smith – backing vocals (4)
- Greg Sponberg – backing vocals (4)
- Laban Smith – spoken intro (9)

== Production ==
- Bryan Stewart – A&R
- Morten Schjolin – producer (1)
- Jason Kyle – additional production (1), producer (2–12)
- Allan Hall – additional production (1), producer (2–12)
- Todd Smith – additional production (1), producer (2–12)
- Nicol Sponberg – additional production (1), producer (2–12)
- Glenn Sweitzer – art direction, design
- Russ Harrington – photography
- Star Klem – wardrobe stylist
- Melissa Schleicher – hair, make-up
- Brian Jannsen – management

Technical credits

- Doug Sax – mastering
- Robert Hadley – mastering
- The Mastering Lab (Hollywood, California) – mastering location
- Jason Kyle – tracking engineer, mixing, string recording assistant (2, 7, 11, 12)
- Craig White – tracking engineer, string recording (2, 7, 11, 12)
- Matt Lambert – mixing
- Ryan Lynn – assistant engineer
- Greg Strizek – assistant engineer
- John Thompson – assistant engineer

== Awards ==
At the 36th GMA Dove Awards, the album was nominated to four Dove Awards, including Inspirational Album of the Year. The song "You Raise Me Up" was nominated to Song of the Year and Inspirational Recorded Song of the Year. The song "I Bless Your Name" was also nominated for Worship Song of the Year.

== Charts ==
Album – Billboard
Year	Chart	Position
2004	Top Christian Albums	2
2004	Billboard 200	61
2007	Catalog Albums	1

== Certifications ==
Region	Certification	Certified units/sales
United States (RIAA)	Gold	500,000^{^}
^{^} Shipments figures based on certification alone.
