= Greatest Hymns, Vol. 2 =

Studio album by Selah
- Released: August 26, 2016
- Genre: CCM
- Length: 68:04
- Label: Curb Records
- Producer: Jason Kyle; Todd Smith; Allan Hall; Ed Cash

Selah chronology
You Amaze Us (2014)	Greatest Hymns, Vol. 2 (2016)	Unbreakable (2017)

Professional ratings
Review scores
Source	Rating
Absolutely Gospel	4/5 stars

Greatest Hymns, Vol. 2 is a 2016 album by CCM group Selah. It was released August 26, 2016 by Curb Records.

== Critical reception ==
Rocky Logan reviews Greatest Hymns, Vol. 2 for Absolutely Gospel and gives it 4 out of a possible 5 stars. He writes, "Another great group of songs from one the very best at capturing the enduring spirit of the past and weaving it in with the present."

Jessie Clarks of The Christian Beat remarks, "Greatest Hymns, Vol. 2, the latest release from multi Dove Award-winners Selah, has landed at #1 on Nielsen SoundScan’s Inspirational chart this week."

== Track listing ==
No.	Title	Writer(s)	Length
1.	"How Deep the Father's Love for Us"	Stuart Townsend	3:19
2.	"Just as I Am" (additional lyrics and melody by Amy Perry)	William B. Bradbury; Charlotte Elliott	4:46
3.	"Into My Heart/Fairest Lord Jesus"	Harry Dixon Clarke	3:38
4.	"The Old Rugged Cross"	George Bennard	3:25
5.	"I Surrender All"	Judson W. Van DeVenter; Winfield S. Weeden	2:48
6.	"Revive Us Again"	William Paton Mackay	3:13
7.	"In the Garden"	Charles Austin Miles	4:33
8.	"'Tis So Sweet to Trust in Jesus" (Kirabu (African) lyrics by Todd Smith. Additional music by Amy Perry, Jason Kyle Saetveit and Todd Smith.)	William James Kirkpatrick; Louisa M. R. Stead	4:27
9.	"The Lord's Prayer (Deliver Us)"	Traditional	3:49
10.	"Victory in Jesus"	Eugene Monroe Bartlett	5:44
11.	"My Jesus I Love Thee"	William Ralph Featherston; Adoniram Judson Gordon	3:15
12.	"Standing on the Promises (Medley): Standing on the Promises; Leaning on the Everlastin Arms; Are You Washed in the Blood"	Russell Kelso Carter; Anthony J. Showalter; Elisha Hoffman; Elisha Hoffman	3:11
13.	"God Be with You"	Jeremiah Eames Rankin	3:08
Total length:			49:16

Bonus tracks (new recordings)
No.	Title	Writer(s)	Length
14.	"Holy, Holy, Holy"	Reginald Heber	4:12
15.	"O the Blood (Radio Version)"	Thomas Miller; Mary Elizabeth Miller	3:52
16.	"Wayfaring Stranger"	Traditional	3:44
17.	"Wonderful, Merciful Savior"	Eric Wise; Dawn Rogers	3:48
18.	"Amazing Grace"	John Newton	3:12
Total length:			68:04

== Musicians ==
- Amy Perry – Vocals, Stomps & Claps (Track 10)
- Allan Hall – Vocals, Piano (Tracks 1–6, 9–14, 16–18), Rhodes (Track 7)
- Todd Smith – Vocals, Stomps & Claps (Track 10)
- Garth Justice – Drums (Tracks 2, 10, 14)
- David Davidson – Strings (Tracks 1, 3, 9, 13), Solo Violin (Track 13)
- David Angell – Strings (Tracks 1, 3, 9, 13)
- Monisa Angell – Strings (Tracks 1, 3, 9, 13)
- John Catchings – Strings (Tracks 1, 3, 9, 13)
- Jim Grosjean – Strings (Tracks 3, 9)
- Pam Sixfin – Strings (Tracks 3, 9)
- Catherine Umstead – Strings (Tracks 3, 9)
- Alan Umstead – Strings (Tracks 3, 9)
- Conni Ellisor – Strings (Tracks 3, 9)
- Carolyn Bailey – Strings (Tracks 3, 9)
- Anthony LaMarchina – Strings (Tracks 3, 9)
- Paul Mills – String Arrangement (Tracks 1, 3, 9, 13)
- Eric Darken – Percussion (Tracks 1, 8, 10, 12)
- Tim Lauer – Accordion (Tracks 1, 13)
- Vicki Hampton – Choir (Tracks 2, 14)
- Bob Bailey – Choir (Tracks 2, 14)
- Jerard Woods – Choir (Tracks 2, 14)
- Jovaun Woods – Choir (Track 14)
- Matt Pierson – Bass (Tracks 2, 10, 14)
- Biff Watson – Acoustic Guitar (Tracks 2, 10, 14)
- Jerry McPherson – Electric Guitar (Tracks 2, 7, 10, 14)
- Gordon Mote – Organ (Track 6)
- John Catchings – Cello (Track 7)
- Ellie, Abby & Kate Smith – Kids Vocals (Track 8)
- Steven Sheehan – Acoustic Guitar & Bowed Acoustic (Track 8)
- Noah Hungate – Drums (Track 8)
- David Hungate – Bass (Track 8)
- Jason Kyle Saetveit – Drums (Track 10), Background Vocals (Track 10), Stomps & Claps (Track 10)
- Jakk Kincaid – Acoustic Guitar (Track 12)

== Production ==
- Allan Hall – Producer (Tracks 1–14, 16–18)
- Jason Kyle – Producer (Tracks 1–14, 16–18)
- Todd Smith – Producer (Tracks 1–14, 16–18)
- Ed Cash – Producer (Track 15)
- Doug Sax – Mastering (Tracks 1–13)
- Sangwook "Sunny" Nam – Mastering (Tracks 1–13)
- Adam Ayan – Compiled, Mastering (Tracks 14–18)
- Caleb Kuhl – Photography
- Blair Munday – Art Direction
- Lee Steffen – Photography
- Bryan Stewart – A&R
- Jandy Works – Design

Track information and credits verified from the album's liner notes.

== Charts ==
Chart (2016)	Peak position
US Top Christian Albums (Billboard)	8
US Top Album Sales (Billboard)	94
US Top Current Album Sales (Billboard)	80
