= WOW Hymns =

Compilation album by Various artists
- Released: March 6, 2007
- Genre: Christian Contemporary music
- Label: Word Entertainment

Professional ratings
Review scores
Source	Rating
AllMusic	2.5/5 stars

WOW Hymns: 30 Modern & Classic Hymns from Today's Top Artists is a two-disc compilation album of hymns that have been recorded by popular Christian musicians. It was released on March 6, 2007. The album features thirty songs by Jeremy Camp, Chris Tomlin, Casting Crowns, Third Day, Newsboys, Chris Rice, Nichole Nordeman, David Crowder Band, and many other well-known groups and singers. The album reached No. 100 on the Billboard 200 chart, and #3 on the Top Christian Albums chart in 2007.

== Track listing ==
Disc 1

1. Holy, Holy, Holy - Steven Curtis Chapman (4:54)
2. Take My Life (And Let It Be) - Chris Tomlin (5:00)
3. For the Beauty of the Earth - BarlowGirl (3:17)
4. 'Tis So Sweet to Trust in Jesus - Casting Crowns (3:16)
5. Fairest Lord Jesus - Natalie Grant (4:57)
6. I Need Thee Every Hour - Jars of Clay (3:48)
7. I Surrender All - Brian Littrell (3:58)
8. All the Heavens - Third Day (4:03)
9. In Christ Alone - Newsboys (4:16)
10. Just as I Am - Nichole Nordeman (4:07)
11. Wonderful Maker - Jeremy Camp (4:29)
12. Trust and Obey - Big Daddy Weave (3:54)
13. There Is a Fountain - Selah (3:56)
14. Here Is Love - Matt Redman (5:32)
15. The Solid Rock - Avalon (4:11)

Disc 2

1. Doxology - David Crowder Band (4:35)
2. The Wonderful Cross - Michael W. Smith (6:24)
3. This Is My Father's World - Amy Grant (3:06)
4. The Old Rugged Cross - Bart Millard from MercyMe (4:24)
5. It Is Well with My Soul - Rebecca St. James (4:08)
6. All Creatures of Our God and King - Bethany Dillon, Shawn McDonald (4:48)
7. Come Thou Fount of Every Blessing - Mark Schultz (3:31)
8. Draw Me Nearer - Caedmon's Call (4:19)
9. Praise to the Lord, the Almighty - Passion, Watermark (4:56)
10. Be Thou My Vision - Fernando Ortega (3:52)
11. Grace That Is Greater - Building 429 (4:09)
12. Savior Like a Shepherd Lead Us - Todd Agnew (4:06)
13. All Hail the Power of Jesus' Name - Point of Grace (2:34)
14. Great Is Thy Faithfulness - Israel Houghton (5:25)
15. Rock of Ages - Chris Rice (3:14)

== See also ==
- WOW Hits

== Notes ==
- Mark Schultz's song "Come Thou Fount of Every Blessing" was released before it actually released on his album.
