= The Advocate =

An advocate is a professional in the field of law.

The Advocate, The Advocates or Advocate may also refer to:

== Magazines ==
- The Advocate (magazine), an LGBTQ+ magazine based in the United States
- The Harvard Advocate, a literary magazine from Harvard University
- Advocate: Newsletter of the National Tertiary Education Union, a newsletter of the National Tertiary Education Union

== Newspapers ==
=== Australia ===
- The Advocate (Melbourne), a Catholic weekly
- The Advocate (Tasmania), a newspaper

=== United States ===
- The Advocate (Louisiana), based in Baton Rouge, the largest daily newspaper in Louisiana
- The Advocate (Contra Costa College), a student newspaper in San Pablo, California
- The Advocate (Fairhaven), a community newspaper in Massachusetts
- The Advocate (Newark), a newspaper in Newark, Ohio
- Advocate (Pittsburgh), a 19th-century newspaper in Pittsburgh, Pennsylvania
- The Advocate (Portland, Oregon), a defunct African-American newspaper in Portland, Oregon
- Stamford Advocate, a daily newspaper in Stamford, Connecticut
- The Advocate-Messenger, a newspaper published in Danville, Kentucky
- CTNow, previously The Advocate Weekly Newspapers, a set of weekly newspapers in Connecticut and Massachusetts
- The Daily Advocate, a daily newspaper in Greenville, Ohio
- Julesburg Advocate, a weekly newspaper in Julesburg, Colorado
- The Victoria Advocate, Victoria, Texas
- The Winter Park Advocate a newspaper for African Americans published in Winter Park, Florida

=== Elsewhere ===
- Red Deer Advocate, a newspaper covering central Alberta, Canada

== Arts and entertainment ==
- "The Advocate", a hymn better known as "Before the Throne of God Above" by Charitie Lees Smith
- The Advocate (1925 film), a French silent drama film
- The Hour of the Pig, a 1993 film by Leslie Megahey, titled The Advocate in the USA
- The Advocate: A Missing Body, a 2015 South Korean film by Heo Jong-ho
- The Advocates (TV series), a 1990s Scottish legal drama
- Advocate (2019 film), a documentary film by Rachel Leah Jones and Philippe Bellaiche
- "Advocates" (short story), a 1922 posthumous short story by Franz Kafka
- The Advocate (album), an album by Tony Oxley

== Ships ==
- USS Advocate (1861), a small fishing sloop captured from the Confederates in 1861
- USS Advocate (AM-138), a minesweeper launched on 1942 and transferred to the Soviet Union under Lend-Lease

== People ==
- Attaullah Advocate, Pakistani politician
- Advocate Nasiruddin (1892–1949), lawyer, political and social leader

== Places ==
- Advocate Harbour
- Advocates Library, law library in Edinburgh

== See also ==
- Advocaat, a Dutch alcoholic beverage
- Advocacy, activity by an individual or group that aims to influence decisions
- Advocatus, a medieval term for an advocate
- Lord Advocate, a legal officer of the Scottish Government and the Crown in Scotland
- Times-Advocate (disambiguation), which could refer to various newspapers
