= Rose of Bethlehem =

Studio album by Selah
- Released: October 15, 2002
- Genres: Christmas, contemporary Christian music
- Length: 41:58
- Label: Curb
- Producers: Jason Kyle; Todd Smith; Allan Hall; Nicol Smith

Selah chronology
Press On (2001)	Rose of Bethlehem (2002)	Hiding Place (2004)

Professional ratings
Review scores
Source	Rating
CCM Magazine	4/5 stars

Rose of Bethlehem is the third album and first Christmas album by CCM group Selah. It was released October 15, 2002 by Curb Records.

== Critical reception ==
Andy Argyrakis of CCM Magazine gives the album four out of a possible five stars and writes, "anyone discovering these selections for the first time will surely delight in the vocal purity and inspirational arrangements throughout the title track, 'Silent Night', 'Light of the Stable' and 'Once Upon a Christmas' (which includes country great Dolly Parton)"

Crosswalk says in their review, "With Selah, there's definitely more than meets the eye. The trio made up of two Smith siblings (Nicol and Todd) and one pianist (Allan Hall) may appear to be very average, normal folk at first glance. But with one listen to the vocal group steadily building a loyal following sans pomp and circumstance, you'll soon know their talent is far from the norm. And Rose of Bethlehem—their latest and first Christmas project—testifies to that fact."

== Track listing ==
No.	Title	Writer(s)	Length
1.	"Silent Night"	Franz Gruber; Joseph Mohr	4:15
2.	"O Come, O Come Emmanuel"	John Mason Neale	4:45
3.	"Light of the Stable"	Steven Rhymer; Elizabeth Rhymer	3:18
4.	"Once Upon a Christmas"	Dolly Parton	4:46
5.	"What Child is This"	William Chatterton Dix	5:50
6.	"Joy"	Angela Smith; Nicol Sponberg; Todd Smith	3:52
7.	"Noel"	Todd Smith	1:45
8.	"O Holy Night"	Adolphe Adam; Placide Cappeau	4:37
9.	"Mystery"	Angela Smith; Todd Smith	4:46
10.	"Rose of Bethlehem"	Lowell Alexander	4:04
Total length:			41:58

Deluxe edition (October 7, 2016)
No.	Title	Writer(s)	Length
11.	"Mary Sweet Mary" (featuring Plumb)	Kevin Thomas; Tiffany Arbuckle Lee	3:16
12.	"Little Drummer Boy"	Harry Simeone; Katherine Kennicott Davis; Henry Onorati	4:02
13.	"Dance in the Dawn"	Tony Wood; Chad Cates; Todd Smith	3:45
14.	"Where Are You Christmas?"	James Horner; Mariah Carey; Will Jennings	3:43
15.	"God Rest Ye Merry Gentlemen/We Three Kings (Medley)" (featuring Annie Moses Band)	Traditional/John Henry Hopkins, Jr.	5:21
Total length:			62:05

== Personnel ==
Selah

- Allan Hall – vocals, acoustic piano, arrangements
- Nicol Smith – vocals, backing vocals, arrangements
- Todd Smith – vocals, backing vocals, arrangements

Musicians and Vocalists

- Blair Masters – keyboards
- George Cocchini – electric guitars
- John Jorgenson – electric guitars
- Biff Watson – acoustic guitars
- Joe Chemay – bass
- Jackie Street – bass
- Craig Young – bass
- Paul Leim – drums, drum programming, djembe
- Tony Morra – drums
- Eric Darken – percussion
- Mary Kathryn Vanosdale – violin solo
- Michael Omartian – arrangements
- Jason Kyle – backing vocals
- Chris Tait – backing vocals
- Dolly Parton – vocals (4)
- Plumb – vocals (11)
- Annie Moses Band – instruments and vocals (15)

String Section

- Paul Mills – string arrangements
- David Angell, John Catchings, Jim Grosjean, Anthony LaMarchina, Pamela Sixfin, Elizabeth Stewart and Gary Vanosdale – string players

== Production ==
- Selah – producers, liner notes
- Jason Kyle – producer, engineer, mixing
- Matt Lambert – mixing
- Jerry Guidroz – assistant engineer
- Andrew Mendelson – mastering
- Denny Purcell – mastering
- Georgetown Masters (Nashville, Tennessee) – mastering location
- Glenn Sweitzer – art direction, design
- Greg Call – cover illustration
- Russ Harrington – photography
- Mary Elizabeth Long – hair, make-up
- Trish Townsend – wardrobe

== Charts ==
Chart (2002)	Peak position
US Top Christian Albums	16
US Heatseeker Albums (Billboard)	5

Chart (2005)	Peak position
US Top Holiday Albums (Billboard)	3
US Catalog Albums (Billboard)	1
