= My Jesus I Love Thee =

Christian hymn

- by attr. William Ralph Featherston
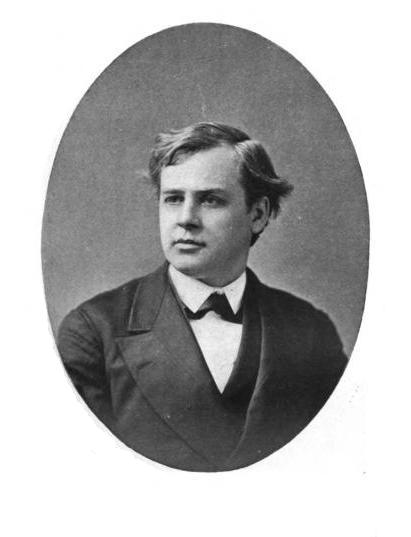
- Adoniram Judson Gordon
- Genre: Hymn
- Written: 1872
- Based on: John 21:15
- Meter: 11.11.11.11
- Melody: "Gordon" by Adoniram Judson Gordon

My Jesus, I Love Thee

My Jesus, I love Thee, I know Thou art mine;
For Thee all the follies of sin I resign.
My gracious Redeemer, my Savior art Thou;
If ever I loved Thee, my Jesus, 'tis now.

I love Thee because Thou has first loved me,
And purchased my pardon on Calvary's tree.
I love Thee for wearing the thorns on Thy brow;
If ever I loved Thee, my Jesus, 'tis now.

I'll love Thee in life, I will love Thee in death,
And praise Thee as long as Thou lendest me breath;
And say when the death dew lies cold on my brow,
If ever I loved Thee, my Jesus, 'tis now.

In mansions of glory and endless delight,
I'll ever adore Thee in heaven so bright;
I'll sing with the glittering crown on my brow;
If ever I loved Thee, my Jesus, 'tis now.

"My Jesus, I Love Thee"
Performed by Frederic C. Freemantel. Recorded in Philadelphia, November 8, 1908.

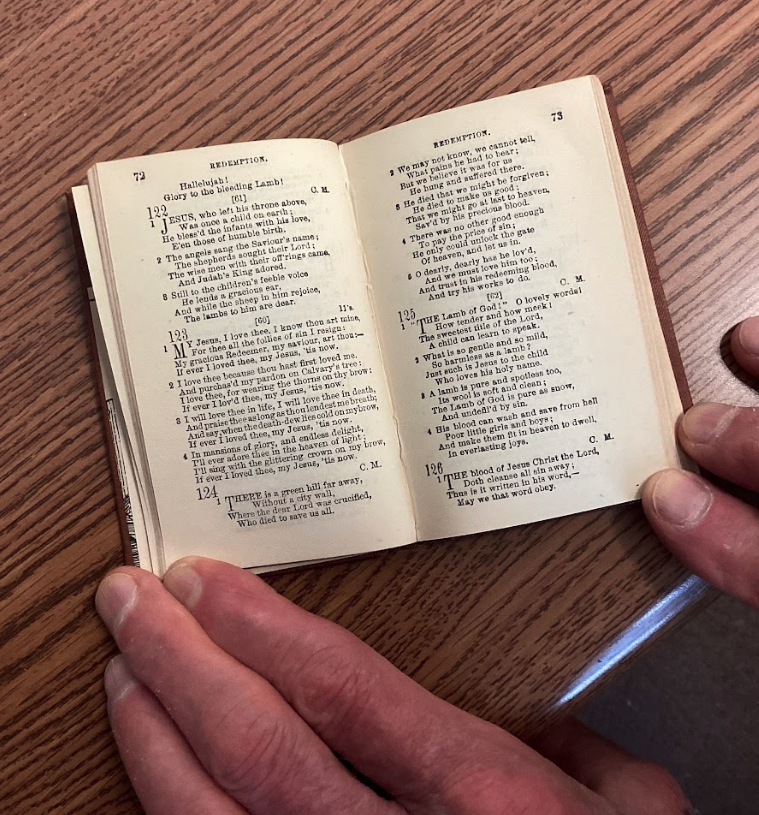
1864 miniature hardcover imprint of the Primitive Methodists' Sabbath School Hymns, ed. William Antliff. In the collection of the Boston University School of Theology Library

My Jesus I Love Thee appeared twice in 1862, first in The Christian Pioneer (February, six verses) edited by Joseph Foulkes Winks, then in October in The Primitive Methodist Magazine edited by William Antliff - who published the same version the following two years in works for children, one in the Primitive Methodist Juvenile Magazine, 1863, and one in the Primitive Methodists' Sabbath School Hymns, 1864. (October, four verses). This version is, save for a two-word edit in The London Hymn Book, the version we sing today. All five appearances, including three by Antliff, bear no attribution, nor does the 1872 setting by Adoniram Judson (A.J.) Gordon. Several lines and phrases of this poem are borrowed nearly verbatim from the hymn O Jesus my Savior, I know though art mine by Kentucky camp meeting evangelist Caleb Jarvis Taylor, published in 1804; the camp meeting is the connection with England's Primitive Methodists, of which William Antliff was a leading figure at the time this hymn emerged.

Though the poem is said to have been written by William Ralph Featherston in 1864 when he was alleged to have been 16 years old, the hymn had already appeared two years earlier, and his birth date is actually three years later (1849) than the legend has it - he would have been 12 years old. No evidence has ever been provided of his authorship, and though the legend appears in the UK version of Ira D. Sankey's 1906 memoir My Life and Sacred Songs (with factual errors, including a date when the supposed writer would turn nine), the attribution is entirely absent from the US version published simultaneously in 1906 and in a longer edition a year later in 1907 of My life and the story of the gospel hymns and of sacred songs and solos, in which his attribution is Anonymous.

This hymn is used as the basis for the song Imandra by Ananias Davisson in the Supplement to the Kentucky Harmony in 1820, reprinted in Southern Harmony in 1835. There are other similarities between this poem and camp-meeting songs published in the 1820s onward.

In 1872 Adoniram Judson Gordon wrote a new setting to this hymn, published in The Vestry Hymn and Tune Book (1872). This tune was posthumously named GORDON. A.J. Gordon is also the founder of Gordon College and Gordon-Conwell Theological Seminary.

== Inspiration ==
According to Tim Challies,

Not much is known about Featherston, except that he attended a Methodist church in Montreal, that he was young when he wrote the poem (12 or 16 years old), and that he died at just 27 years of age. One story about how the poem became public is that Featherston mailed it to his aunt in Los Angeles who, upon reading it, quickly sought its publication... It wasn't until several years after Featherston's death that Adoniram Judson Gordon (founder of Gordon College and Gordon-Conwell Theological Seminary) added a melody and published it in his book of hymns, thus forever transforming this poem to a song.

The United Methodist Church's Hymns of the United Methodist Church, a guide to the denomination's hymnal, states that Featherstone was 16 years old when he wrote the text in 1864. Kenneth Osbeck writes of this hymn in his book, 101 More Hymn Stories: "It is difficult to realize that this beloved devotional hymn, which expresses so profoundly a believer's love and gratitude to Christ ... was written by a teenager".

== Notable recordings ==
- Amy Grant recorded a version of the song for her 2002 studio album Legacy... Hymns and Faith that was later included on her 2015 compilation album Be Still and Know... Hymns & Faith.
- Paul Baloche performed the song in a various artist album, Hymns 4 Worship, Vol. 2: Just As I Am which was released in 2005.
- Selah recorded a three-stanza version of the song in their 2009 album, You Deliver Me.
- In 2013, Darlene Zschech, along with Michael W. Smith, recorded an extra verse to this on the live worship DVD, Revealing Jesus.
- The hymn has also been performed and recorded by Shane & Shane, John MacArthur, Kory Welch, and instrumental adaptation by Sebastian Demrey.
- Worship Circle recorded a live rendition in 2019, performed by Meredith Andrews. on their various artist album "Worship Circle Hymns" among the likes of Jeremy Riddle, Paul Baloche, Kim Walker-Smith and more.

== Additional Sources ==
- Reynolds, William Jensen. Hymns of Our Faith. Nashville, Tennessee: Broadman Press, 1964. (p. 291)
- Taylor, Gordon Harry. Companion to the Song Book of the Salvation Army. St. Albans, England: The Campfield Press, 1988. (p. 300)
- Center for Church Music
