= Be Still My Soul (Selah album) =

Studio album by Selah
- Released: May 18, 1999
- Recorded: June 1997
- Studios: Heavenspun Studios, Sunset Studios and The Guest Room (Nashville, Tennessee)
- Genres: CCM; gospel; soul
- Length: 44:33
- Languages: English, Kituba
- Label: Curb Records
- Producers: Kyle Jason; Todd Smith; Allan Hall

Selah chronology
Be Still My Soul (1999)	Press On (2001)

Be Still My Soul is the debut album of Selah, released in 1999.

The album consists of modern arrangements of traditional Christian hymns. The first track starts out with a Kituba translation of "Pass Me Not, O Gentle Savior", a language singers and siblings Nicol and Todd Smith know because of a missionary upbringing in Subsaharan Africa. The band says that because they were on a very small budget for the album, they were forced to keep it simple, which explains the strong emphasis on vocals with piano.

== Reception and awards ==
CCM Magazine described it to be "a beautiful and moving music experience. While the production is sparse (piano and strings with occasional guitar and percussion), the performances are at once dynamic and soulful." Steve Huey of AllMusic notes the "slight African sensibilities" in "the gospel stylings of Selah". AllMusic gave it a rating of 3 out of 5 stars.

The album won the Inspirational Album of the Year Dove Award in 2000.

== Chart positions ==
Chart (2007)	Peak position
US Heatseakers (Billboard)	33
US Top Christian Albums (Billboard)	24

== Track listing ==
No.	Title	Writer(s)	Length
1.	"Bika Mono Ve (Pass Me Not, O Gentle Savior) / It Is Well With My Soul"	Francis J. Crosby, William H. Doane / Horatio Spafford, Philip Bliss	5:38
2.	"Be Still My Soul / What A Friend We Have In Jesus"	Jean Sibelius, Jane Laurie Borthwick / Joseph M. Scriven, William Bolcom	3:52
3.	"Precious Lord Take My Hand / Just A Closer Walk With Thee"	Thomas A. Dorsey, George Nelson Allen / traditional gospel song	5:06
4.	"Great Is Thy Faithfulness"	Thomas Chisholm, William M. Runyan	5:37
5.	"His Eye Is On The Sparrow"	Civilla D. Martin, Charles H. Gabriel	3:38
6.	"Sweet, Sweet Song Of Salvation"	Larry Norman	2:52
7.	"When I Survey The Wondrous Cross"	Isaac Watts	3:59
8.	"The Blood Will Never Lose Its Power"	Andraé Crouch	3:36
9.	"One Thing I Know"	Joel Lindsay, Jason Alan Whitmore	4:11
10.	"Wayfaring Stranger"	American spiritual folk song	4:39
11.	"Turn Your Eyes Upon Jesus"	Helen Howarth Lemmel	1:25

== Personnel ==
Selah

- Allan Hall – vocals, acoustic piano (1–5, 7–10), arrangements (1–5, 10, 11)
- Nicol Smith – vocals, arrangements (1–3, 5, 10, 11)
- Todd Smith – vocals, arrangements (1, 3–5, 10, 11)

Additional musicians

- Chris Rodriguez – guitars (1, 4)
- Jeff Quimby – drums (6), percussion (6)
- The Nashville String Machine – strings (2, 5, 9)
- Carl Gorodetzky – string leader (2, 5, 9)
- Paul Mills – string arrangements (2, 5, 9)
- David Maddux – arrangements (7)

== Production ==
- Todd Smith – producer
- Allan Hall – producer, engineer
- Jason Kyle – producer, engineer
- Steve Dady – engineer
- Jeff Pitzer – assistant engineer
- Glenn Sweitzer – art direction, design
- Russ Harrington – photography
- Selah – liner notes
