= You Deliver Me =

Studio album by Selah
- Released: August 25, 2009
- Recorded: 2009
- Studios: Platinum Lab Recording and Prime Recording (Nashville, Tennessee)
- Genres: Christian, Inspirational
- Length: 55:34
- Label: Word/Curb
- Producers: Jason Kyle; Todd Smith; Allan Hall; Bernie Herms

Selah chronology
Bless the Broken Road: The Duets Album (2006)	You Deliver Me (2009)	Hope of the Broken World (2011)

You Deliver Me is Selah's seventh studio album. It features a cover of Hillsong Worship's "Hosanna". The album was released August 25, 2009.

== Critical reception ==
Professional ratings
Review scores
Source	Rating
AllMusic	3/5 stars
Cross Rhythms	8/10 squares

Andree Farias of AllMusic concludes his review with, "Selah is perhaps the only unoriginal true original left in Christian music, a group that sticks to its classic guns while everyone else chases the latest flavor of the moment."

Dale Lewis reviews the album for TitleTrakk and begins, "Selah, best known for their contemporary hit "You Raise Me Up," returns with a very personal and poignant album in You Deliver Me."

Suzie Brock of Cross Rhythms gives the album 8 out of a possible 10 and writes, "Throughout the whole album the standard of the lead vocals and harmonies is very high, with every song being touching in a different way. Piano is featured heavily in the arrangements which are refreshingly contemporary. Selah's personnel have changed considerably down the years but they retain a slick professionalism and a winning way of mixing old hymns and new material."

== Track listing ==
No.	Title	Writer(s)	Length
1.	"Into My Heart/Fairest Lord Jesus"	Harry Dixon Clarke/Traditional	3:43
2.	"How Deep The Fathers Love For Us"	Stuart Townend	3:24
3.	"You Deliver Me"	Mike Post; Brian Nash; J. David Pearson	4:05
4.	"Hosanna"	Brooke Fraser	4:56
5.	"Standing on the Promises (Medley): Standing on the Promises; Leaning on the Everlastin Arms; Are You Washed in the Blood"	Russell Kelso Carter; Anthony J. Showalter; Elisha Hoffman; Elisha Hoffman	3:14
6.	"The Lords Prayer (Deliver Us)"	Traditional	3:51
7.	"Beautiful Terrible Cross"	Todd D. Smith; Tony Wood; Chad Cates	3:33
8.	"Unredeemed"	Tony Wood; Chad Cates; Brian David Petak	4:47
9.	"My Jesus I Love Thee"	William Ralph Featherston	3:18
10.	"I Have Decided" (feat. Jack & Molly Smith)	Jason Kyle Saetveit; Todd D. Smith	2:40
11.	"Glory To His Name"	Elisha A. Hoffman	4:01
12.	"Depth Of Mercy"	Tony Wood; Chad Cates	3:34
13.	"I Surrender All"	Judson W. Van DeVenter; Winfield S. Weeden	2:52
14.	"God Be With You"	Jeremiah Rankin	3:17
15.	"I Will Carry You (Audrey's Song)"	Todd D. Smith; Angela Carole Smith; Christa Wells	4:09
Total length:			55:34

- Track information and credits verified from the album's liner notes.

== Personnel ==
Selah

- Allan Hall – backing vocals (1–9, 11, 12, 14), acoustic piano (1–3, 5–7, 9–15), lead vocals (14)
- Amy Perry – lead vocals (1–3, 5, 6, 8, 9, 11, 12, 14, 15), backing vocals (1–9, 11, 12, 14)
- Todd Smith – lead vocals (1–7, 9–14), backing vocals (1–12, 14, 15)

Musicians

- Tim Lauer – accordion (2, 7, 12, 14)
- Charlie Judge – keyboards (3), Hammond B3 organ (3), programming (3), strings (3)
- Jason Kyle – additional keyboards (3), additional vocals (11)
- Bernie Herms – acoustic piano (4, 8), keyboards (4)
- Gordon Mote – keyboards (7), Hammond B3 organ (11)
- Adam Lester – guitars (4, 8)
- Trevor Morgan – acoustic guitar (4)
- Jakk Kincaid – acoustic guitar (5, 11)
- Aaron Sands – bass (3)
- James Gregory – bass (4)
- Tony Lucido – bass (8)
- Dan Immel – upright bass (11)
- Noah Hungate – drums (3)
- Dan Needham – drums (4, 8)
- Eric Darken – percussion (2, 3, 5, 7, 10)
- Carl Gorodetzky – string contractor (4, 8)
- David Angell – strings (1, 2, 6, 7, 14)
- Monisa Angell – strings (1, 2, 6, 7, 14)
- Carolyn Bailey – strings (1, 6)
- David Davidson – strings (1, 2, 6, 7, 14), violin solo (14)
- Conni Ellisor – strings (1, 6)
- Anthony LaMarchina – strings (1, 6)
- John Catchings – strings (2, 6, 7, 14), cello (12, 14)
- Jonathan Yudkin – strings (3)
- Jim Grosjean – strings (6)
- Pamela Sixfin – strings (6)
- Alan Umstead – strings (6)
- Catherine Umstead – strings (6)
- The Nashville String Machine – strings (4, 8)
- Nickie Conley – choir vocals (3, 11)
- Louis Cross – choir vocals (3, 11)
- Janet Kenyon – choir vocals (3, 11)
- Jack Smith – vocals (10)
- Molly Smith – vocals (10)

Music arrangements

- Allan Hall – arrangements (1–3, 5–7, 9–15)
- Todd Smith – arrangements (1–3, 5–7, 9–15)
- Jason Kyle – arrangements (1–3, 5–7, 9–15)
- Paul Mills – string arrangements (1, 2, 6, 7, 14)
- Bernie Herms – arrangements (4, 8)
- Jim Gray – string arrangements and conductor (4, 8)

=== Production ===
- John Ozier – A&R
- Bryan Stewart – A&R
- Allan Hall – producer (1–3, 5–7, 9–15)
- Todd Smith – producer (1–3, 5–7, 9–15)
- Jason Kyle – producer (1–3, 5–7, 9–15)
- Bernie Herms – producer (4, 8)
- Lee Wright – art direction, design
- Reid Rolls – photography

Technical credits

- Doug Sax – mastering
- Sangwook Nam – mastering
- The Mastering Lab (Ojai, California) – mastering location
- Jason Kyle – mixing, engineer
- Joe Baldridge – engineer
- Danny Duncan – engineer
- Bernie Herms – engineer
- Bill Whittington – engineer
- Daewoo Kim – string engineer
- Brent King – string engineer
- Travis Brigman – assistant engineer
- Matt Coles – assistant engineer
- Lowell Reynolds – assistant engineer
- Joshua Keith – drum editing (3)

== Charts ==
Chart (2009)	Peak position
US Billboard 200	66
US Top Christian Albums (Billboard)	4

== Awards ==
In 2010, the album was nominated for a Dove Award for Inspirational Album of the Year at the 41st GMA Dove Awards.

The song "Hosanna" was nominated for Inspirational Recorded Song of the Year as well as the Worship Song of the Year at the 41st GMA Dove Awards.
