= Press On (Selah album) =

Studio album by Selah
- Released: June 12, 2001
- Studio: Room With a View Studios
- Genre: Christian; inspirational
- Length: 47:45
- Label: Curb
- Producer: Jason Kyle; Todd Smith; Allan Hall; Nicol Smith

Selah chronology
Be Still My Soul (1999)	Press On (2001)	Rose of Bethlehem (2002)

Professional ratings
Review scores
Source	Rating
AllMusic	4/5 stars
Cross Rhythms	8/10 squares

Press On is the second album by the CCM band Selah. It was released on June 12, 2001 by Curb Records.

== Critical reception ==
Ashleigh Kittle of AllMusic writes, "Composed of brother and sister Todd and Nicol Smith plus friend Allan Hall, the Curb recording artists offer moving vocal arrangements and harmonies, which include Nicol Smith's deep, rich voice, reminiscent of Ashley Cleveland."

Paddy Hudspith reviews the album for Cross Rhythms and gives it 8 out of a possible 10 and remarks, "I was most impressed by the variety on offer here, from acapella or sparse string arrangements, to mature pop and even a touch of bluesy rock! Selah's three singers have more distinctive tones than some vocal groups on the CCM scene. Recommended."

== Track listing ==
No.	Title	Writer(s)	Length
1.	"Oh Draw Me Lord"	David Baroni	3:20
2.	"There is a Fountain"	William Cowper; Lowell Mason	3:57
3.	"In My Life/If We Never Meet Again"	John Lennon; Paul McCartney/Albert E. Brumley	4:13
4.	"Hold On"	Jesse Dixon	3:44
5.	"Wonderful, Merciful Saviour"	Dawn Rodgers; Eric Wyse	4:12
6.	"Were You There" (featuring Russ Taff)	Russ Taff; James Hollihan	3:20
7.	"Deep (Way Down)"	Traditional	2:32
8.	"Yesu Azali Awa"	Traditional	4:09
9.	"Timeless"	Levi Kreis	3:30
10.	"How Great Thou Art"	Stuart K. Hine	6:09
11.	"Amazing Grace"	John Newton	3:23
12.	"Press On"	Dan Burgess	3:59
13.	"Oh Draw Me Lord (Reprise)"	David Baroni	1:17
Total length:			47:45

== Charts ==
Chart performance for Press On
Chart (2001)	Peak position
US Christian Albums (Billboard)	23
US Heatseekers Albums (Billboard)	50
