= Press On =

Press On may refer to:

- Press On (June Carter Cash album), 1999
- Press On (Selah album), 2001
