= Hope of the Broken World =

Studio album by Selah
- Released: August 23, 2011
- Recorded: 2011
- Studio: Arcade Studios, Blackbird Studios, Ocean Way Nashville, Platinum Lab Recording, Prime Recording and ThirtySeventeen (Nashville, Tennessee)
- Genre: Christian, Inspirational, Religious
- Length: 49:31
- Label: Word/Curb
- Producer: Jason Kyle; Todd Smith; Allan Hall; Bernie Herms

Selah chronology
You Deliver Me (2009)	Hope of the Broken World (2011)	You Amaze Us (2014)

Hope of the Broken World is the name of Selah's eighth studio album. The album was released August 23, 2011 by Curb.

== Critical reception ==
Professional ratings
Review scores
Source	Rating
AllMusic	3.5/5 stars

James Christopher Monger of AllMusic writes, "Dove award-winning, contemporary gospel trio Selah have made a career out of mining the past and fusing it with the present, crafting new hymns that honor the classics, and bringing old hymns out of the shadows and into the light."

Timothy Yap reviews the album for Hallels and concludes, "Hope of the Broken World resembles a beautiful tapestry weaving together threads of different influences. But more importantly, these songs weave for us a picture of what it means to relate to God and how we are to love others."

In her review of the song, "Coat of Many Colors" for CCM Magazine Caroline Lusk remarks of the album, "The latest album from Selah is like a breath of fresh air. Not only for the listener…but for the group themselves."

== Track listing ==
No.	Title	Writer(s)	Length
1.	"On the Mountain"	Christa Wells	3:37
2.	"Hope of the Broken World"	Carl Cartee; Jennie Lee Riddle	4:00
3.	"Shelter Me"	Julie Miller; Buddy Miller	2:55
4.	"Coat of Many Colors"	Dolly Parton	3:42
5.	"He'll Hold You"	Amy Perry	3:57
6.	"Be Still"	Todd Smith; Jack Smith; Luke Sheets	4:01
7.	"Moments Like These"	Michael Boggs; Todd Smith	5:25
8.	"I Turn to You"	Chris Eaton; Todd Smith	4:06
9.	"'Tis So Sweet to Trust in Jesus"	William James Kirkpatrick; Louisa M. R. Stead; Kituba (African) lyrics by Todd Smith	4:32
10.	"Threshold of Glory"	Will Yates; Jennie Lee Riddle; Crystal Yates	4:26
11.	"I Look to You"	Robert Kelly	4:23
12.	"When Love Was Slain"	Jennie Lee Riddle; Crystal Yates	4:27
Total length:			49:31

- Track information and credits verified from the album's liner notes.

== Personnel ==
Selah

- Allan Hall – vocals, acoustic piano, electric piano, arrangements
- Todd Smith – vocals, arrangements
- Amy Perry – vocals, arrangements

Musicians

- Charlie Judge – acoustic piano, keyboards, programming
- Jeffrey East – Wurlitzer electric piano, Hammond B3 organ
- Bernie Herms – keyboards, arrangements
- Todd Farrell – electric guitars
- Adam Lester – electric guitars
- Jakk Kincaid – electric guitars, acoustic guitars
- Jerry McPherson – electric guitars
- Michael Boggs – acoustic guitars
- Trevor Morgan – acoustic guitars
- Steve Sheehan – acoustic guitars, banjo
- Chris Donohue – bass
- David Hungate – bass
- James Gregory – bass
- Steve Brewster – drums
- Noah Hungate – drums
- Dan Needham – drums
- Eric Darken – percussion
- Abby Smith, Ellie Smith and Kate Smith – children's voices

Nashville String Machine

- Paul Mills – string arrangements
- Carl Gorodetzky – contractor
- John Catchings – cello
- Anthony LaMarchina – cello
- Craig Nelson – double bass
- Jim Grosjean – viola
- Kristin Wilkinson – viola
- David Angell – violin
- Janet Darnell – violin
- David Davidson – violin, concertmaster
- Conni Ellisor – violin
- Pamela Sixfin – violin
- Mary Kathryn Vanosdale – violin
- Karen Winklemann – violin

=== Production ===
- Bryan Stewart – A&R
- Allan Hall – producer (1–7, 9–12)
- Todd Smith – producer (1–7, 9–12)
- Jason Kyle – producer (1–7, 9–12), engineer (1–7, 9–12)
- Bernie Herms – producer (8), engineer (8)
- Joe Baldridge – engineer
- Mark Lambert – engineer
- Bill Whittington – engineer
- Baheo "Bobby" Shin – engineer
- Brent King – string engineer
- Matt Coles – assistant engineer
- Todd Farrell – assistant engineer, production assistant
- Joshua Keith – assistant engineer
- Matt Naylor – assistant engineer
- Lowell Reynolds – assistant string engineer
- Justin Niebank – mixing
- Drew Bollman – mix assistant
- Doug Sax – mastering
- Sangwook Nam – mastering
- The Mastering Lab (Ojai, California) – mastering location
- Caleb Khul – photography
- Anna Redmon – wardrobe stylist
- Edward St. George – hair stylist, make-up
- Selah – liner notes

== Charts ==
Chart (2011)	Peak position
US Billboard 200	87
US Top Christian Albums (Billboard)	4
