= Bless the Broken Road: The Duets Album =

Studio album by Selah
- Released: August 8, 2006
- Studios: Arcade Studios, Blackbird Studio, Sound Shop, Love Shack Studios and Little Big Sound (Nashville, Tennessee); MaxiMedia Recording Studios (Dallas, Texas); The Troubadour Studio (MacGregor, Texas)
- Genre: Contemporary Christian music
- Length: 48:01
- Label: Curb
- Producers: Allan Hall; Jason Kyle; Todd D. Smith; Keith Thomas

Selah chronology
Greatest Hymns (2005)	Bless the Broken Road: The Duets Album (2006)	Timeless: The Selah Collection (2007)

Professional ratings
Review scores
Source	Rating
AllMusic	4/5 stars

Bless the Broken Road: The Duets Album is an album from contemporary Christian group Selah. It features the collaboration of other artists of the genre in each song. The album was released on August 8, 2006.

== Track listing ==
Album release
No.	Title	Writer(s)	Length
1.	"Bless the Broken Road" (featuring Melodie Crittenden)	Bobby Boyd, Jeff Hanna, Marcus Hummon	4:10
2.	"Gentle Healer" (featuring Amy Perry)	Michael Card	2:45
3.	"Glory" (featuring Nichole Nordeman)	Nichole Nordeman	4:12
4.	"I Will Sing of My Redeemer" (featuring BarlowGirl)	Chad Cates, Todd Smith, Tony Wood	3:34
5.	"Follow Jesus (Landa Yesu)" (featuring Nicole C. Mullen)	Cates, James Smith, Smith, Wood	4:01
6.	"Mary Sweet Mary" (featuring Plumb)	Tiffany Arbuckle-Lee, Keith Thomas	3:13
7.	"All My Tears (Be Washed Away)" (featuring Kim Hill)	Julie Miller	3:49
8.	"Ain't No Grave" (featuring Jason Crabb & Adam Crabb)	James Hollihan, Russ Taff	4:43
9.	"Be Thou Near to Me" (featuring Amy Perry)	David Grow	3:34
10.	"The Faithful One" (featuring Christy Nockels)	Chris Eaton, Brian Gene White	5:47
11.	"Sweet Jesus" (featuring Jill Phillips)	Smith, Matthew West, Wood	3:01
12.	"Softly and Tenderly" (featuring Cynthia Clawson)	Raymond Brown, Will L. Thompson	5:12
Total length:			48:01

== Personnel ==
Selah

- Allan Hall – vocals, acoustic piano
- Todd Smith – vocals

Musicians and Vocalists

- Matt Stanfield – keyboards, programming
- Keith Thomas – keyboards, programming
- Jerry McPherson – electric guitars
- John Thompson Jr. – acoustic guitars
- Biff Watson – acoustic guitars
- David Hungate – bass
- Shannon Forest – drums
- Eric Darken – percussion
- Adam Crabb – harmonica (8), vocals (8)
- David Angell – strings
- Monisa Angell – strings
- David Davidson – strings, violin solo
- Anthony LaMarchina – strings
- Pamela Sixfin – strings
- Kristin Wilkinson – strings
- Paul Mills – string arrangements
- Jason Kyle – backing vocals
- Melodie Crittenden – vocals (1)
- Amy Perry – vocals (2, 9)
- Nichole Nordeman – vocals (3)
- BarlowGirl – vocals (4)
- Nicole C. Mullen – vocals (5)
- Plumb – vocals (6)
- Kim Hill – vocals (7)
- Jason Crabb – vocals (8)
- Christy Nockels – vocals (10)
- Jill Phillips – vocals (11)
- Cynthia Clawson – vocals (12)

=== Production ===
- Bryan Stewart – A&R
- Allan Hall – producer
- Todd Smith – producer
- Jason Kyle – producer, tracking engineer, mixing, editing
- Keith Thomas – co-producer (6)
- Jeff Balding – tracking engineer, mixing
- Steven Collins – assistant engineer
- Allen Ditto – assistant engineer
- Michael Havens – assistant engineer
- Doug Sax – mastering
- Sangwook Nam – mastering
- The Mastering Lab (Ojai, California) – mastering location
- John Ozier – artist coordinator
- Glenn Sweitzer – art direction, design
- Erika Anderson – photography
- Brian Jannsen – management

== Awards ==
At the 38th GMA Dove Awards, the album won a Dove Awards for Inspirational Album of the Year. The title song was also nominated for Pop/Contemporary Recorded Song of the Year and Song of the Year, while the song "Glory" (featuring Nichole Nordeman) was nominated for Inspirational Recorded Song of the Year.

== Chart performance ==
The album peaked at No. 43 on the Billboard 200 and No. 1 on Billboard's Christian Albums where it remained for 39 weeks. The title song also peaked at No. 5 on Billboard's Christian Songs.
