= William Ralph Featherston =

William Ralph Featherston (1848–1875) was a Christian hymnwriter who wrote the poem My Jesus I Love Thee. He is believed to have written the poem at the age of either 12 or 16 years.

In 1876 Adoniram Gordon used the poem as lyrics for a hymn.

Featherston died prior to his 27th birthday, and is not known to have written any other songs.

== Inspiration ==
According to Tim Challies,

Not much is known about Featherston, except that he attended a Methodist church in Montreal, that he was young when he wrote the poem (12 or 16 years old), and that he died at just 27 years of age. One story about how the poem became public is that Featherston mailed it to his aunt in Los Angeles who, upon reading it, quickly sought its publication... It wasn’t until several years after Featherston’s death that Adoniram Judson Gordon (founder of Gordon College and Gordon-Conwell Theological Seminary) added a melody and published it in his book of hymns, thus forever transforming this poem to a song.

== Other sources ==
- Reynolds, William Jensen. Hymns of Our Faith. Nashville, Tennessee: Broadman Press, 1964. (p. 291)
- Taylor, Gordon Harry. Companion to the Song Book of the Salvation Army. St. Albans, England: The Campfield Press, 1988. (p. 300)
- Center for Church Music
