= I Surrender All =

Christian hymn written by Judson W. Van DeVenter

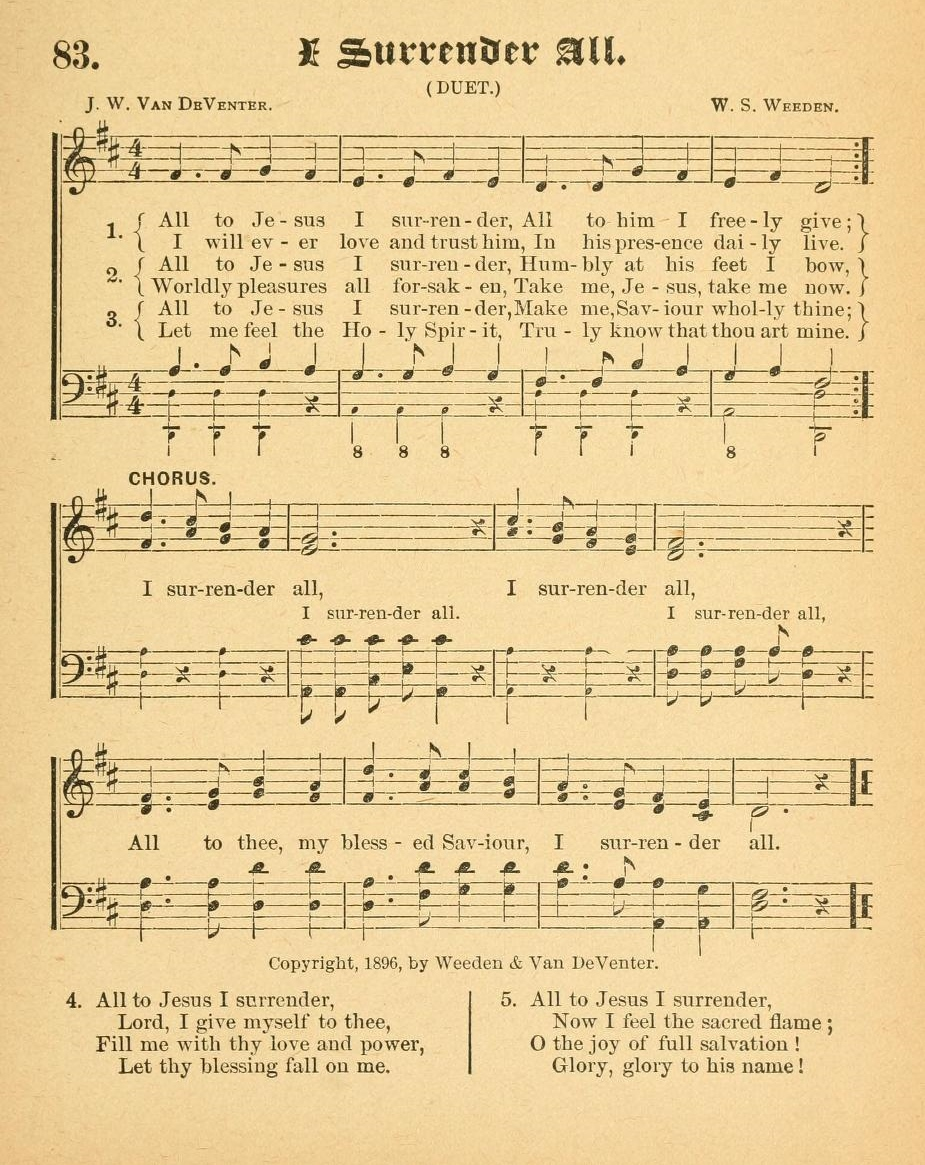
- First publication of "I Surrender All", in Gospel Songs of Grace and Glory (1896)
- Text: Judson W. Van DeVenter
- Meter: 8.7.8.7 with refrain
- Melody: Winfield S. Weeden
- Published: 1896

"I Surrender All" is a Christian hymn, with words written by American art teacher and musician Judson W. Van DeVenter (1855–1939), who subsequently became a music minister and evangelist. It was put to music by Winfield S. Weeden (1847–1908), and published in 1896.

Van DeVenter said of the inspiration for the text:

For some time, I had struggled between developing my talents in the field of art and going into full-time evangelistic work. At last the pivotal hour of my life came, and I surrendered all. A new day was ushered into my life. I became an evangelist and discovered down deep in my soul a talent hitherto unknown to me. God had hidden a song in my heart, and touching a tender chord, He caused me to sing.

== Van DeVenter and inception of the hymn ==
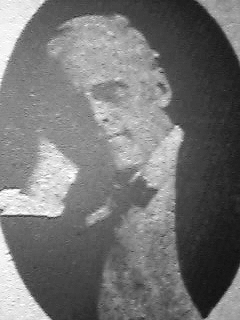
Judson W. Van DeVenter

Judson Van DeVenter was born on a farm in Michigan in 1855. Following graduation from Hillsdale College, he became an art teacher and supervisor of art in the public schools of Sharon, Pennsylvania. He was, in addition, an accomplished musician, singer, and composer. Van DeVenter was also an active layman in his Methodist Episcopal Church, involved in the church's evangelistic meetings. Recognizing his talent for the ministry, friends urged him to give up teaching and become an evangelist. Van DeVenter wavered for five years between becoming a recognized artist or devoting himself to ministry. Finally, he surrendered his life to Christian service, and wrote the text of the hymn while conducting a meeting at the Ohio home of noted evangelist George Sebring.

Following his decision to surrender his life to the Divine, Van DeVenter traveled throughout the United States, England, and Scotland, doing evangelistic work. Winfield S. Weeden, his associate and singer, assisted him for many years. Toward the end of his life, Van DeVenter moved to Florida, and was professor of hymnology at the Florida Bible Institute for four years in the 1920s. After his retirement, he remained involved in speaking and in religious gatherings. Van DeVenter published more than 60 hymns in his lifetime, but "I Surrender All" is his most famous.

"I Surrender All" was put to music by Weeden, and first published in 1896 in Gospel Songs of Grace and Glory, a collection of old and new hymns by various hymnists, compiled by Weeden, Van DeVenter, and Leonard Weaver, and published by Sebring Publishing Co. The following year, Van DeVenter and Weeden also published their jointly written gospel hymn "Sunlight". Weeden, born in Ohio in 1847, taught in singing schools prior to becoming an evangelist, and was a noted song leader and vocalist. Weeden published many hymns in several volumes, including The Peacemaker (1894), Songs of the Peacemaker (1895), and Songs of Sovereign Grace (1897). His tombstone is inscribed with the title of this hymn, "I Surrender All".

== Contemporary usage ==
"I Surrender All" has continued to appear in numerous English-language hymnals since its publication. It is both a classic hymn and, due to its gospel-like nature, also one that is performed by churches that prefer contemporary music.

In the late 1930s, when popular international evangelist Billy Graham was a student at Florida Bible Institute, he studied and fellowshipped with Judson Van DeVenter, and later stated that Van DeVenter greatly influenced his early preaching. Graham subsequently popularized "I Surrender All" in his massive crusades and revivals, beginning in the late 1940s.

In 1986, pop singer Deniece Williams, who had had a No. 1 hit the previous year with "Let's Hear It for the Boy", released an album of gospel songs, titled So Glad I Know. Her performance of "I Surrender All" on the album won the Grammy Award for Best Female Soul Gospel Performance.

Oprah Winfrey has stated that the hymn played a pivotal role in her life. While she was still a minor Chicago talk-show host, she had auditioned for the role of Sofia in the 1985 film The Color Purple, and desperately wanted the part. After being told that real actresses were being considered instead, she went to a weight-loss camp to slim down in a last effort to be considered. As she ran on the track, she surrendered her desperate desire to God and sang "I Surrender All" until it brought her a sense of peace and release. When she went back indoors, Steven Spielberg was on the phone offering her the part. For her performance in the film, Winfrey was nominated for an Academy Award and a Golden Globe in 1986, and later that year her talk show was renamed for her, expanded to a full hour, and broadcast nationwide. In 2005, when singer Faith Hill appeared on The Oprah Winfrey Show, during rehearsals Winfrey discovered Hill also had a passion for the hymn, and she had her sing it on her Oprah After the Show television program.

== Notable recordings ==
"I Surrender All" was recorded as early as 1909 by the Edison Mixed Quartet on an Edison cylinder, and the recording is preserved by the University of California Santa Barbara Cylinder Audio Archive.

Other significant recordings include those by:

- Mahalia Jackson, on her album The Forgotten Recordings (posthumous compilation, 2005)
- Andraé Crouch, on his album Live in London (1978)
- Little Richard, on his album God's Beautiful City (1979)
- Deniece Williams, on her album So Glad I Know (1986) (Grammy Award for Best Soul Gospel Performance, Female)
- Glen Campbell, on his albums Favorite Hymns (1989) and Home at Last (1989)
- Cece Winans, on her album Alone in His Presence (1995)
- Carman, on his album I Surrender All: 30 Classic Hymns (1997)
- The Holmes Brothers, on their album Promised Land (1997)
- Ruben Studdard, on his album I Need an Angel (2004)
- Amy Grant, on her album Rock of Ages... Hymns and Faith (2005)
- Oslo Gospel Choir, on their live album We Lift Our Hands (2005)
- Brian Littrell, on the album WOW Hymns (2007)
- Phil Driscoll, on his album Songs in the Key of Worship (2008)
- Michael W. Smith, with Coalo Zamorano, on his album A New Hallelujah (2008)
- Selah, on their album You Deliver Me (2009)
- Kathy Troccoli, on her album Worshipsongs: 'Tis So Sweet (2013)
- Newsboys, on their album Hallelujah for the Cross (2014)
- June Hunt, on her album Songs of Surrender
- Carrie Underwood, on her album My Savior (2021)

== Text ==
Theological historian Charles H. Lippy notes that the hymn's text expresses values of "victorious life" concepts of late 19th-century evangelism. The victorious life entailed total surrender to Divine will in order to triumph over the problems of daily existence. Lippy summarizes this as follows: "[T]hrough absolute surrender to the power of the Holy Spirit, by giving the self over to possession by the supernatural, one could triumph and thus attain power and control over the course of one's life."

In keeping with the gospel tradition, "I Surrender All" repeats key words throughout the hymn. Each stanza begins with "All to Jesus I surrender". The hymn's chorus repeats "I surrender all" three times, and an additional two times in the men's part. The entire hymn, if sung with each refrain and second-voice part, contains the word "surrender" 30 times, and the word "all" 43 times.

The hymn's first stanza stresses complete surrender: "All to him I freely give". The second stanza surrenders worldly pleasures, and the third prays to "feel the Holy Spirit". Stanza four asks to be filled with Jesus's love, power, and blessing. In the fifth stanza, the singer feels "the sacred flame" – an image of the Holy Spirit – and the joy of "full salvation" born of surrender.

== Lyrics ==
All to Jesus I surrender,
All to him I freely give;
I will ever love and trust him,
In his presence daily live.

Refrain:
I surrender all,
I surrender all,
All to thee, my blessed Savior,
I surrender all.

All to Jesus I surrender,
Humbly at his feet I bow,
Worldly pleasures all forsaken,
Take me, Jesus, take me now.
(Refrain)

All to Jesus I surrender;
Make me, Savior, wholly thine;
Let me feel the Holy Spirit,
Truly know that thou art mine.
(Refrain)

All to Jesus I surrender,
Lord, I give myself to thee,
Fill me with thy love and power,
Let thy blessing fall on me.
(Refrain)

All to Jesus I surrender;
Now I feel the sacred flame.
Oh, the joy of full salvation!
Glory, glory, to his name!
(Refrain)
