= Times-Advocate =

Times-Advocate may refer to:

- The Daily Times-Advocate, also known as the Escondido Times-Advocate, a newspaper published in Escondido, California from 1909 to 1995
- The Exeter Times-Advocate, a newspaper published in Exeter, Ontario
- The Advocate (Louisiana), sometimes referred to as the State Times-Advocate, a newspaper published in Baton Rouge, Louisiana
- The Gregory Times-Advocate, a newspaper published in Gregory, South Dakota
- The Edwards County Times-Advocate, a newspaper published in West Salem, Illinois
- The Taloga Times-Advocate, a weekly newspaper published in Taloga, Oklahoma

== See also ==
- The Advocate (disambiguation)
- The Times (disambiguation)
