= Annie Moses Band =

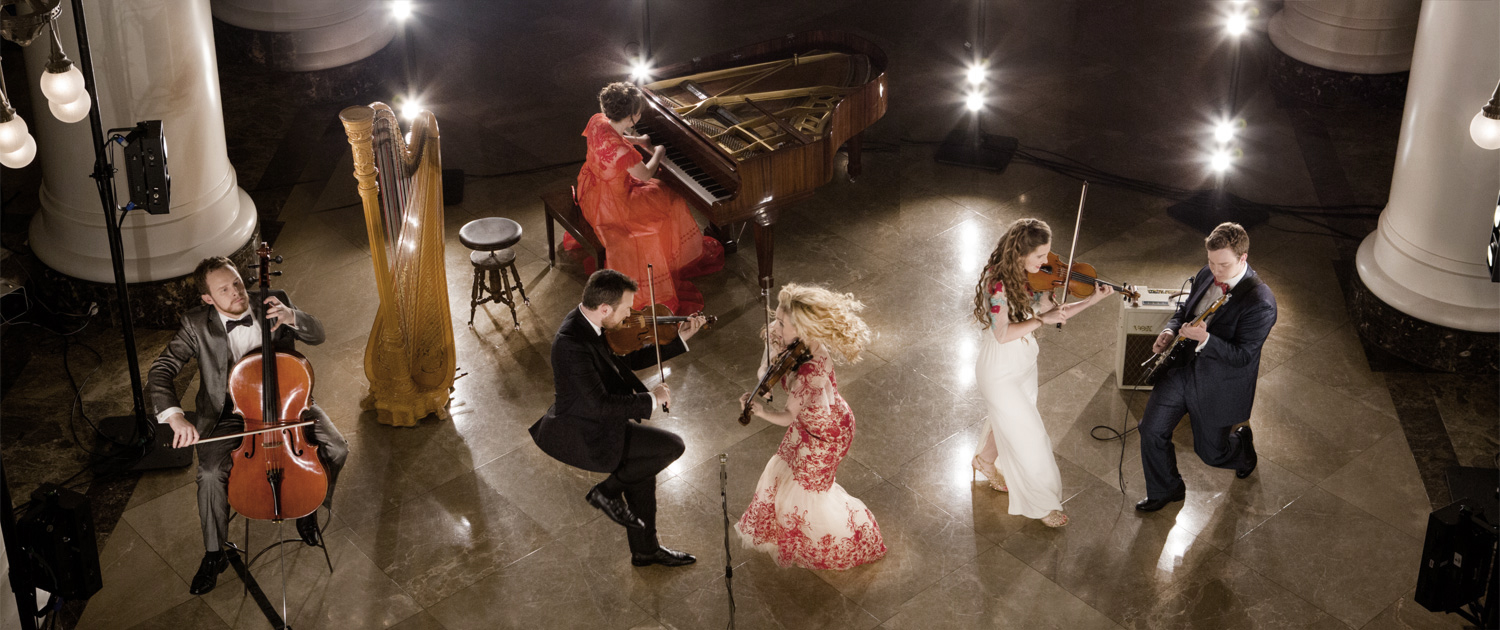
- Annie Moses Band performing

Background information
- Origin: Nashville, Tennessee
- Genres: folk, Americana, classical, jazz, bluegrass, pop
- Years active: 2002–present
- Labels: Provident Label Group, Warner Classics
- Website: www.anniemosesband.com

Annie Moses Band is a family of Nashville-based musicians and creators who have founded multiple artistic enterprises over a career spanning decades. Composed of seven classically-trained siblings and their veteran songwriter parents, the Wolaver family has produced 18 albums, 6 live DVDs, including 2 PBS specials, 9 musicals for children, 2 Broadway musicals, numerous music videos, and produced the television show, The Wonderful World of Benjamin Cello. As the Annie Moses Band, they have performed across the United States, Europe, and Asia and in venues such as Carnegie Hall and The Grand Ole Opry.

== History ==
The Annie Moses Band signed with Provident Sony in 2008 and subsequently released This Glorious Christmas, which hit the Top Ten on Billboard Magazine's Classical Crossover chart. The following year, the band released a PBS special, Christmas With The Annie Moses Band which garnered over 1,200 hours of airtime, setting the record for a debut artist. In 2012, Annie Moses Band made their debut at Carnegie Hall and the Grand Ole Opry. Their subsequent album, Pilgrims & Prodigals, ranked No. 11 on the Billboard Bluegrass Albums chart and peaked at No. 6 on Billboard's Heatseekers - Northeast chart.

== Discography ==
- 2002 - Cloud 9, Eb & Flo Music
- 2005 - Eden, ManAlive Records
- 2006 - Bethlehem, House of Bread, ManAlive Records
- 2006 - Always Morning Somewhere, ManAlive Records
- 2007 - Through the Looking Glass, ManAlive Records
- 2007 - Christmas Bright & Beautiful, ManAlive Records
- 2008 - This Glorious Christmas, Sony BMG/ManAlive Records
- 2009 - Christmas with the Annie Moses Band, ManAlive Records/Dream Journey
- 2012 - Pilgrims & Prodigals, ManAlive Records
- 2013 - Christmas Loves Company, ManAlive Records
- 2014 - Best of the Beginning, ManAlive Records
- 2015 - American Rhapsody, Warner Classics
- 2016 - The Art of the Love Song, Warner Classics/Rhino
- 2017 - This Glorious Christmas Deluxe, ManAlive Records
- 2018 - O Holy Night, ManAlive Records
- 2021 - Tales From My Grandpa's Pulpit, Gaither Music
