= USS Advocate (1861) =

USS Advocate was a fishing sloop of the United States Navy. She was captured after flying a Confederate flag in Mississippi Sound by the screw steamer USS New London on 1 December 1861. She was purchased by the US Navy to be sunk as a blockship at Ship Island but was apparently sunk as an obstruction in Petit Bois Channel, Alabama instead.
