= You Amaze Us =

Studio album by Selah
- Released: August 19, 2014
- Genres: Contemporary Christian music, contemporary worship music
- Length: 62:47
- Label: Curb
- Producers: Ed Cash; Allan Hall; Jordan Mohilowski; Jason Kyle; Todd Smith

Selah chronology
Hope of the Broken World (2011)	You Amaze Us (2014)	Unbreakable (2017)

You Amaze Us marks the ninth album from Selah. Curb Records released the project on August 19, 2014. Allan Hall and Todd Smith of Selah produced this album alongside Ed Cash, Jordan Mohilowski, and Jason Kyle.

== Reception ==
Professional ratings
Review scores
Source	Rating
365 Days of Inspiring Media	4/5 stars
AllMusic	3/5 stars
CCM Magazine	4/5 stars
Christian Music Review	4.7/5
New Release Tuesday	4/5 stars

Specifying in a four star out of five review for CCM Magazine, Andrew Greer discerns, "Selah's latest is poised to be an extra-distinguished installment in their history-making discography."" Phronsie Howell, agrees it is a four-star album for New Release Tuesday, recognizing, "You Amaze Us is another great release from Selah." Shaving a whole star off his rating compared to the other two from AllMusic, Mark Deming believes, "At once thoughtful and passionate, You Amaze Us is a reminder of why Selah are one of the most celebrated and successful acts in Christian music today." Joshua Andre, awarding the album four stars by 365 Days of Inspiring Media, writes, "each of the three vocalists lead their fair share of tracks quite perfectly and majestically." Rating the album a 4.7 out of five for Christian Music Review, Laura Chambers says, "You Amaze Us details the many ways that God astounds us with His qualities of love, mercy, strength and compassion."

== Track listing ==
No.	Title	Writer(s)	Length
1.	"You Amaze Us"	Matthew Adcox, Douglas Fowler, Jordan Mohilowski	4:06
2.	"Oh Our Lord"	Paul Baloche, Leslie Jordan, David Leonard	4:28
3.	"At the Cross"	Matt Armstrong, Benji Cowart, Jenna Cowart, P.D. William R. Newell	4:02
4.	"More and More of You"	Richie Fike, Jonathan Lee, Jennie Lee Riddle	4:50
5.	"Be (My Heart, My Hands, My Voice)"	Jeffrey East, Allan Hall, Jason Kyle Saetveit, Todd Smith	4:10
6.	"Just as I Am"	William B. Bradbury, Charlotte Elliott, Amy Perry	4:51
7.	"Soon and Very Soon"	Andraé Crouch	3:23
8.	"O the Blood"	Mary Elizabeth Miller, Thomas Miller	5:27
9.	"I'd Rather Have Jesus"	Rhea Miller, George Shea	4:49
10.	"The Old Rugged Cross"	George Bernard	3:31
11.	"Victory in Jesus"	E.M. Bartlett	5:49
12.	"Nearing Home"	Jeffrey East, Allan Hall, Jason Kyle Saetveit	4:26
13.	"In the Garden"		4:36
14.	"We Must Not"	Ed Cash, Todd Smith	4:19
Total length:			62:47

== Personnel ==
Selah

- Allan Hall – vocals, backing vocals, acoustic piano, Fender Rhodes, arrangements
- Todd Smith – vocals, backing vocals, arrangements, handclaps, stomping
- Amy Perry – vocals, backing vocals, arrangements, handclaps, stomping

Musicians and Vocalists

- Matthew Adcox – acoustic piano, backing vocals
- Jordan Mohilowski – keyboards, programming, guitars
- Charlie Judge – synthesizers, programming
- Tim Lauer – accordion
- Jason Kyle – programming, synth pads, acoustic guitars, bass, percussion, handclaps, stomping, backing vocals, arrangements
- Ryan McAdoo – acoustic piano, synthesizers
- Jason Webb – Hammond B3 organ
- Justin Hodges – guitars
- Tom Jackson – guitars
- Jerry McPherson – electric guitars
- Matthew Wingate – acoustic guitars, mandolin
- Biff Watson – acoustic guitars
- Ed Cash – acoustic guitars, backing vocals
- Hank Bentley – electric guitars
- Chris Lacorte – electric guitars
- Dan Ostebo – bass, backing vocals
- Matt Pierson – bass
- Tony Lucido – bass
- Colby Forshee – drums
- Garth Justice – drums
- Jacob Schrodt – drums
- Brent Clifford – percussion
- Eric Darken – percussion
- Aubrey Haynie – fiddle
- John Catchings – cello
- Jeffrey East – backing vocals
- Bob Bailey – choir
- Vicki Hampton – choir
- Jerard Woods – choir
- Jovaun Woods – choir

=== Production ===
- Bryan Stewart – A&R
- Allan Hall – producer (1–13)
- Todd Smith – producer (1–11, 13)
- Jason Kyle – producer (1–13), engineer, mixing
- Jordan Mohilowski – producer (1), engineer
- Ed Cash – producer (14), engineer, mixing
- Craig White – engineer
- Craig Alvin – mixing
- Ainslie Grosser – mixing
- David Bates – assistant engineer
- Dan Hernandez – assistant engineer, production assistant
- Doug Sax – mastering at The Mastering Lab (Ojai, California)
- Blair Munday – art direction, design
- Lee Steffan – photography
- Anna Redmon – wardrobe
- Robin Geary – hair stylist, make-up
- Selah – liner notes

== Charts ==
Chart (2014)	Peak position
US Billboard 200	59
US Top Christian Albums (Billboard)	3
