= Melodie Crittenden =

American musician (born 1968)

- Born: September 13, 1968 (age 56)
- Origin: Shawnee, Oklahoma, US
- Genres: Country, Christian
- Occupation: Singer-songwriter
- Instrument: Vocals
- Years active: 1992–present
- Labels: Asylum/Elektra, Sandman

Melodie Crittenden (born September 13, 1968) is an American country and Christian music singer-songwriter.

== Career ==
Her first album, Melodie Sings, was recorded at the age of nine in Norman, Oklahoma. She traveled around Oklahoma with her family band "the Crittendens", performing at crusade events with evangelist Larry Jones, founder of the Feed the Children charity. She recorded a self-titled debut album for Asylum/Elektra Records in 1998, the same year that she charted with her rendition of "Bless the Broken Road" (her version was titled simply "Broken Road"); she would later record the song a second time as a member of the gospel group Selah. She released an additional studio album, while The Woman I Am was slated for release around 2004 but was never released.

As of 2016, Crittenden is a member of the Eagles tribute band Eaglemaniacs, which also includes Ron Hemby, formerly of the Buffalo Club.

== Discography ==
=== Albums ===
Title	Album details
Melodie Crittenden	Release date: February 24, 1998; Label: Elektra Records
Dream with Me Tonight: Lullabies for All Ages	Release date: September 18, 2001; Label: Sandman Records

=== Singles ===
Year	Single	Peak chart positions		Album
Year	Single	US Country	CAN Country	Album
1998	"Broken Road"	42	48	Melodie Crittenden
1998	"I Should've Known"	72	—	Melodie Crittenden
"—" denotes releases that did not chart

=== Guest singles ===
Year	Single	Artist	Peak positions	Album
Year	Single	Artist	US CHR	Album
2006	"Bless the Broken Road"	Selah	5	Bless the Broken Road: The Duets Album

=== Music videos ===
Year	Video	Director
1998	"Broken Road"	Jim Hershleder
