= Charitie Lees Smith =

Anglican-Irish-American hymnist

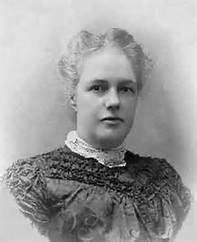
- Born: 21 June 1841; Bloomfield, Merrion, County Dublin, Ireland
- Died: June 20, 1923 (aged 81); Oakland, California, US
- Occupations: hymnwriter, religious writer
- Spouse: Arthur E. Bancroft (m. 1869),
- Writing career
- Language: English
- Notable work: "Before the Throne of God Above"

Charitie Lees Smith (later, Charitie Lees Bancroft; still later Charitie de Cheney or Charitie de Chenez; pen name, C.L.S. 21 June 1841 – 20 June 1923) was an Anglican Irish American hymnwriter. Her hymns, well known in England and Ireland, were included in Lyra Sacra Hibernica, Ryle's Spiritual Songs, Lyra Britannica, and Times of Refreshing. Additionally, she wrote various religious pieces for periodicals.

== Early years ==
Charitie Lees Smith was born on 21 June 1841, at Bloomfield, Merrion, County Dublin, the fourth child of Rev. Dr. George Sidney Smith and Charlotte Lees. The Rev. Smith was the minister of Colebrooke, in the Church of Ireland parish of Aghalurcher from 1838–1867 and, during this period, the family lived in Ardunshin House near Brookeborough, County Fermanagh, Ireland. Her father was also at some point Rector of Drumragh, County Tyrone.

Her talent for poetic composition was developed at an early period of her life.

== Career ==
In 1860, one of Smith's first compositions O for the robes of whiteness appeared in leaflet form in the immediate aftermath of the Irish 1859 revival. In 1863, she wrote perhaps her best known hymn "Before the Throne of God Above", which she entitled The Advocate (a hymn which was revived in evangelical circles in the late 20th century). In 1867, Smith's father took the family to Tattyreagh, Omagh, County Tyrone, when he became the rector of St Columba's Church. Smith continued with her compositions, publishing them in a volume entitled Within the Veil in 1867.

She wrote considerably for several serial publications and contributed hymns to J. C. Ryle's Spiritual Songs, Times of Refreshing, and the Lyra Britannica (1866) of Charles Rogers. Her hymn, "Christ Mighty to Save," was included in the latter publication, while "Heavenly Anticipations" was a favorite in Sunday schools. "Mighty to Save" first appeared in 1867 in the Lyra Britannica, its form being seven stanzas of eight lines each, but it was considerably abbreviated to fit it for common use, including a Cento beginning with the third verse. "Aspirations" was written in the flush and fervor of coming "out of darkness into marvellous light" during the awakenings of 1859-60 in Ireland.

== Personal life ==
In 1869, Smith married a Liverpudlian, Arthur E. Bancroft, in Edinburgh, Scotland. Records of her married life are scarce but it seems she was widowed twice. She died on 20 June 1923, the day before her 82nd birthday, in Oakland, California (aged 81), bearing the surname de Cheney, or de Chenez.
