= Before the Throne of God Above =

Christian hymn by Charitie Lees Smith and Vikki Cook

- by Vikki Cook
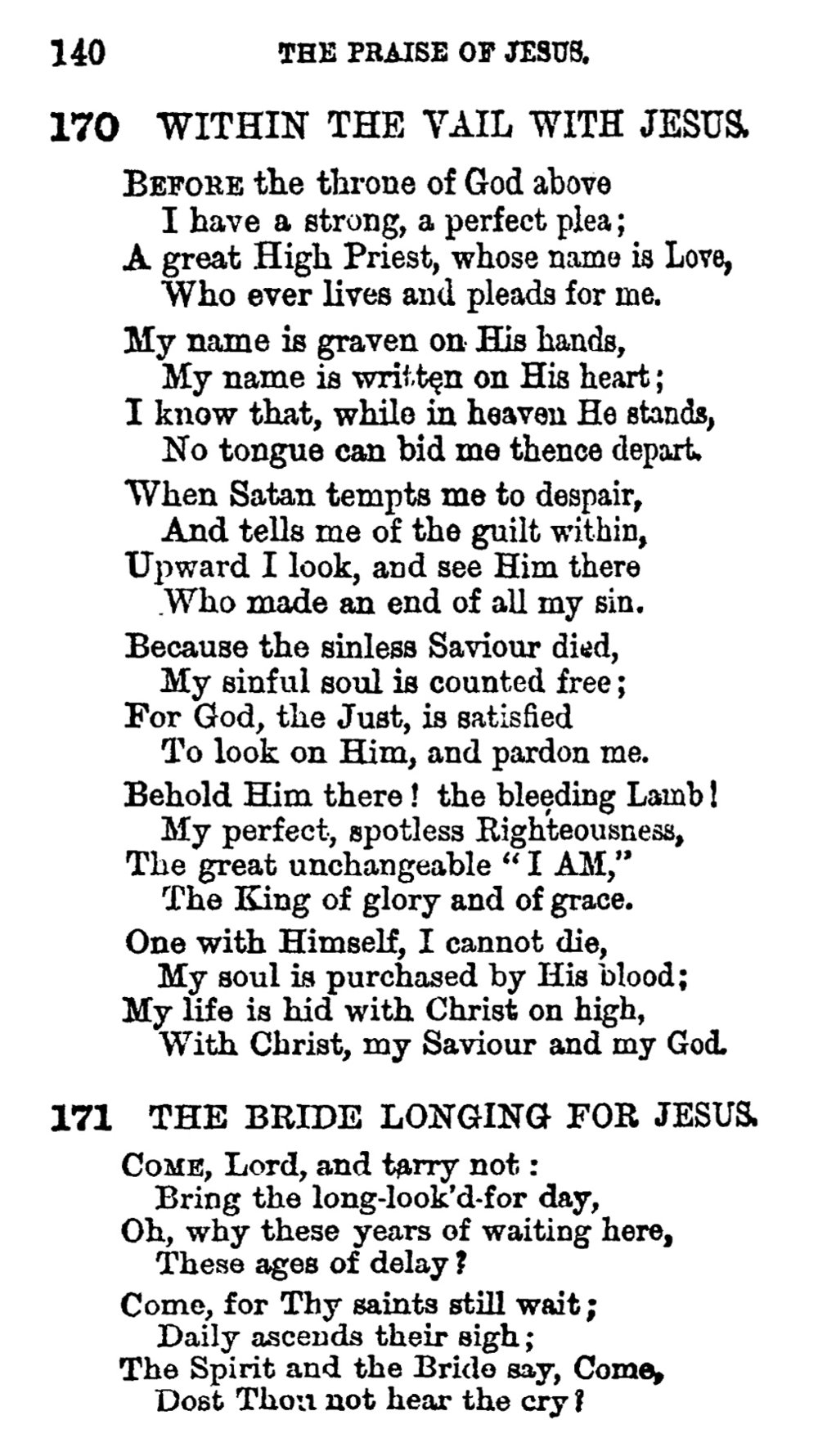
- The 1863 hymn text by Charitie Lees Smith.
- Genre: Christian hymn
- Written: 1863
- Text: by Charitie Lees Smith
- Language: English
- Meter: 8.8.8.8.8.8.8.8.
- Composed: 1997

"Before the Throne of God Above" is a Christian hymn of praise to Jesus in his ascended state. Written in 1863 by Charitie Lees Smith, the most common setting of the hymn is a 1997 arrangement by Vikki Cook that was published by Sovereign Grace Music. The hymn has been published in more than 20 hymnals and has made multiple appearances in the Christian Copyright Licensing International list of the most popular worship songs.

== History ==
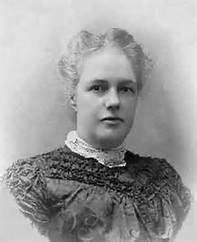
Charitie Lees Smith

Charitie Lees Smith, an Irish Anglican poet, first published the text in 1863 in The Praise of Jesus, a collection of hymn texts. The text—in virtually identical form to the version that would become popular in the 20th and 21st centuries—was arranged in six stanzas of four lines each under the title "Within the Vail with Jesus". It was first published in the United States in Praises of Jesus in 1865. Neither hymnal set the text to music, but the U.S. publication published it adjacent to Duke Street, an appropriate tune. It was published in 1866 in Charles Spurgeon's Our Own Hymn-Book as "Jesus Pleads for Me", attributed for the first time to Smith. In 1867, Smith published the hymn in her own collection, Within the Vail and Other Sacred Poems.

Vikki Cook, a composer who attended a Sovereign Grace church, first heard the hymn during a Sunday service in 1997 set to Hubert Parry's tune "Jerusalem", to which the congregation did not favorably respond. Cook was moved by the lyrics and after meditating them on during personal devotions for some time, she composed a new melody for Smith's text. Cook's tune was first recorded on the Sovereign Grace albumn Depths of Mercy in 1997 and first appeared in a hymnal in 1999. Cook's tune was a forerunner of the "retuned hymn movement" of the early 21st century.

== Text ==
The text as published in 1863 is as follows:

| Stanza 1 | Stanza 2 | Stanza 3 |
| Before the throne of God above I have a strong and perfect plea; A great High Priest whose name is Love, Who ever lives and pleads for me. My name is graven on his hands, My name is written on his heart; I know that while in heaven he stands No tongue can bid me thence depart. | When Satan tempts me to despair And tells me of the guilt within, Upward I look and see him there Who made an end of all my sin. Because the sinless Saviour died, My sinful soul is counted free, For God, the Just, is satisfied To look on him and pardon me. | Behold him there! the bleeding Lamb! (Note: In modern versions, this line is replaced with "Behold him there, the risen Lamb.") My perfect, spotless Righteousness, The great unchangeable "I AM," The King of glory and of grace. One with himself I cannot die, My soul is purchased by his blood; My life is hid with Christ on high, With Christ, my Saviour and my God. (Note: One or more of the preceding sentences incorporates text from these sources, which are in the public domain: Spurgeon, C.H., ed. (1866). Our Own Hymn-Book. A collection of psalms and hymns for public, social, and private worship. London: Passmore & Alabaster. p. 567.) |

Archivist Chris Fenner notes that Smith's text draws on the Epistle to the Hebrews, in particular Hebrews 6:17-20, which describes the role of Jesus as a high priest after the order of Melchizedek and Hebrews 4:14-16, which describes Jesus as the high priest who has passed into the heavens. Stanza also alludes to Isaiah 49:16, which describes God's people as being engraved on the palms of his hands. Hymns similar in content are Charles Wesley's "Entered Into the Holy Place Above" and John Newton's "Approach, My Soul, the Mercy Seat". Other scriptural texts referenced in the hymn include several passages from the Book of Revelation, including Rev. 4 and 5, which depict Jesus as a "lamb standing as if slain"; Rev. 12:10, in which Satan appears as an accuser; and Rev. 22:13.

Theologian David Wheaton has critiqued the poetic language of "while in heaven he stands" as misleading imagery, arguing that "The guarantee of our salvation does not lie in the fact that 'while in heaven he stands...', but while in heaven he sits, and because he is not before but beside the throne of God above." The language of "God the Just" being "satisfied" has been variously welcomed or critiqued for its expression of the doctrine of penal substitutionary atonement.

== Reception ==
Spurgeon was an early enthusiast for the hymn; not only did he select it for his hymnal, but he quoted it in the final public addresses he gave before his death in Menton, France.

Cook's setting of "Before the Throne of God Above" has appeared in several hymnals, including Ancient and Modern (Church of England), the 2008 Baptist Hymnal (Southern Baptist Convention), Christian Worship (Wisconsin Evangelical Lutheran Synod), Church Hymnary (Church of Scotland), Complete Mission Praise, Singing the Faith (Methodist Church of Great Britain), and the Trinity Psalter Hymnal (Presbyterian Church in America and Orthodox Presbyterian Church). Because it describes the role of Jesus interceding after his ascension, the hymn is often used in churches for Ascension Sunday. Its description of Jesus' act of atonement also results in its selection for Lent and Holy Week.

The hymn with Cook's tune has appeared several times on CCLI's list of the top 100 worship songs performed in a given month. The hymn has been recorded by several contemporary artists, including Shane & Shane, Elevation Worship, Citizens, Bright City and Lou Fellingham.
