= Annie Hawks =

American poet and hymnist (1836–1918)

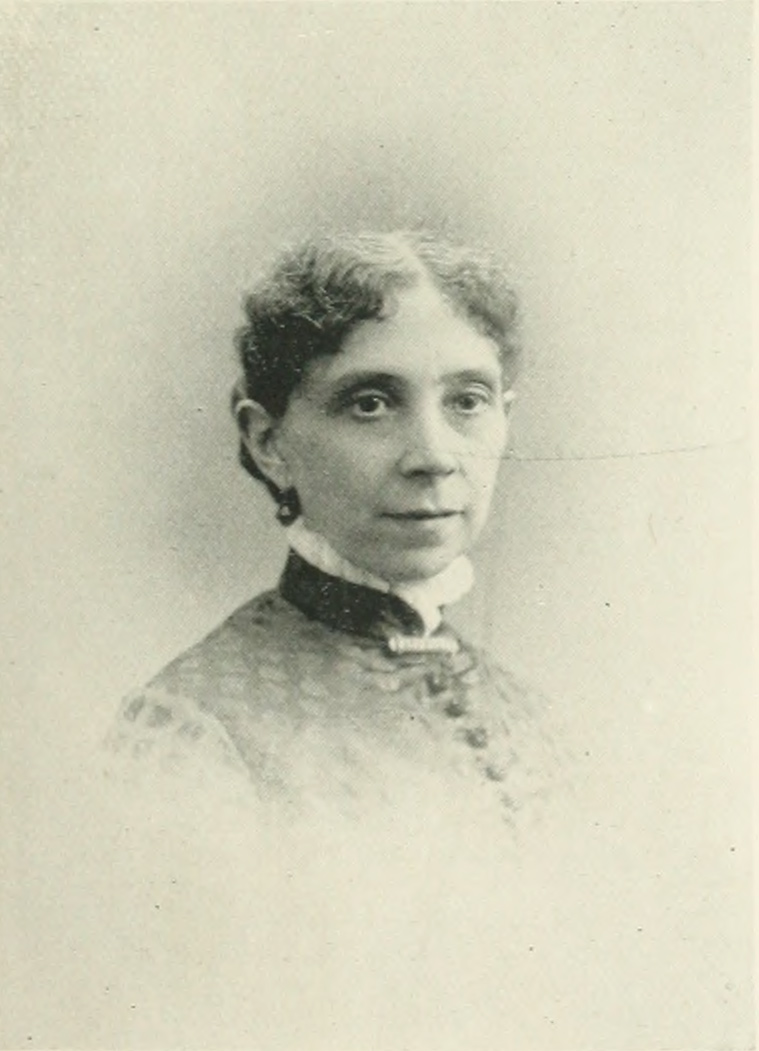
- Hawks from the 1893 compendium A Woman of the Century
- Born: Annie Sherwood; May 28, 1836; Hoosick, New York
- Died: January 3, 1918 (aged 81); Bennington, Vermont
- Occupations: Poet, hymnist
- Spouse: Charles Hial Hawks (m. 1859; died 1888)
- Children: 3
- Writing career
- Notable work: "I Need Thee Every Hour"

Annie Hawks (May 28, 1836 – January 3, 1918) was an American poet and gospel hymnist whose compositions number over 400. She contributed to several popular Sunday school hymnbooks, with her best-known song being "I Need Thee Every Hour". Other well-known hymns include "Thine, Most Gracious Lord", "Why Weepest Thou? Who Seekest Thou?", "Full and Free Salvation", and "My Soul Is Anchored".

== Early life and education ==
Annie Sherwood was born on May 28, 1836, in Hoosick, New York. Her ancestry on her father's side was English, and on her mother's side, remotely, Holland Dutch. She was educated in the public schools and in the Troy Seminary.

She never graduated from a school, but she always had a passion for books and read widely. By age 14, she was submitting poems to a local newspaper.

== Career ==
The first poem which she published appeared in a Troy, New York, newspaper. That poem at once attracted attention and was followed by others which were printed in various local papers.

She married Charles Hial Hawks in 1857 or 1859, a member of a New York banking firm, and a resident of Hoosick. In January 1865, the Hawks removed to Brooklyn. They attended the Hanson Place Baptist Church where Lowry was pastor. Lowry, himself a hymn-writer, encouraged Hawks to compose her own hymns.

In 1868, her pastor and friend, Rev. Dr. Robert Lowry, requested her to turn her attention to hymn writing, and her first hymns were written in that year. Among others, these included, "In the Valley", "Good Night", "Why Weepest Thou?", and "Who'll Be the Next to Follow Jesus". Lowry set all of Hawks' hymns to music. Though Hawks was chiefly known as a writer of hymns, she also wrote many poems.

== "I Need Thee Every Hour" ==
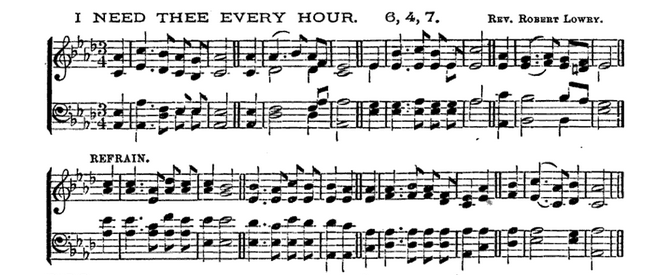
First page of "I Need Thee Every Hour"

In 1872, the hymn by which Hawks is most widely known, "I Need Thee Every Hour", was written. It is said to have been translated into more foreign languages than any other modern hymn at the time of her death. Hawks stated:— "For myself, the hymn was prophetic rather than expressive of my own experiences, for it was wafted out to the world on the wings of love and joy, instead of under the stress of personal sorrow." Lowry, who wrote the music, went on to say: "I Need Thee Every Hour" was written by Mrs. Annie S. Hawks, in 1872, in Brooklyn, New York. I believe it was the expression of her own experience. It came to me in the form of five simple stanzas, to which I added the chorus to make it more serviceable. It inspired me at its first reading. It first appeared in a small collection of original songs prepared for the National Baptist Sunday-school Association, held in Cincinnati, Ohio in November, 1872, and was sung on that occasion."

== Personal life ==
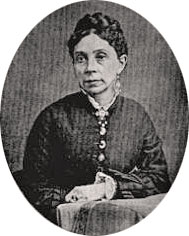
Annie Hawks, c. 1900

Hawks was the mother of three children. She identified with the Baptist denomination. After the death of her husband in 1888, she moved to Bennington, Vermont to live with her daughter and son-in-law. She died there on January 3, 1918, and is interred at the Hoosick Rural Cemetery.
