= Conni Ellisor =

American composer and violinist

Conni Ellisor (born September 25, 1953) is a contemporary American composer and violinist. She was trained at The Juilliard School and the University of Denver's University of Denver, Lamont School of Music, and rose to prominence as Composer-in-Residence of the Nashville Chamber Orchestra in the late 1990s. As a violinist, she has served as a member of the Denver Symphony, concertmaster of the Boulder Philharmonic, first violin in the Athena Quartet (now the Colorado Quartet), and is now a top-call studio musician and member of the Nashville String Machine.

== Orchestral repertoire ==
Ellisor’s contributions to the orchestral repertoire include such uniquely American works as Blackberry Winter for mountain dulcimer and strings, and Whiskey Before Breakfast – Partita for Bluegrass Band and Strings. Blackberry Winter has generated widespread NPR airplay and was featured on All Things Considered. Her long and productive association with the Nashville Chamber Orchestra resulted in the premieres of 11 of her works. Three were recorded for broadcast by NPR’s Performance Today, and her Conversations In Silence became the title track on the orchestra’s 1997 debut album on Warner Bros. The Bangor Daily News described Conversations in Silence as "lush and layered with all of the sounds the stringed instruments are able to make alone and together."

NPR Senior Producer Benjamin Roe’s comment that “the NCO truly is what’s new in classical music” is a testament to Ellisor’s groundbreaking contributions to the group’s repertoire. Among the pieces commissioned by the NCO was Sea Without A Shore, written for orchestra, marimba and percussion and premiered by the NCO, Christopher Norton and world-renowned percussion ensemble Nexus. Other of her works have been premiered and recorded by the St. Paul Chamber Orchestra, London Symphony, Nexus Chamber Orchestra, Denver Brass, Camelli Quartet, New York Treble Singers, Hamburg Radio Orchestra and the London Philharmonic.

== Recent commissions ==
Recent commissions and premieres include Diaspora by the Nashville Symphony (2011), her second concerto for mountain dulcimer and orchestra, Broad Band of Light, by the Tucson Symphony (2012), Tres Danzas De Vida by the Arlington (NY) High School Philharmonia Orchestra (2013), Fort of Shadows by the Arlington High School Sinfonia Orchestra (2014), and The Bass Whisperer, a concerto for electric bass written with and for 5x Grammy-winning bassist Victor Wooten and commissioned by the Nashville Symphony, the Colorado Symphony, and the Chicago Sinfonietta (2015/2016). She has also written and recorded the score for the SONY/Affirm film All Saints (2017) with composer/multi-instrumentalist (and husband) John Mock, through their production company, Drowsy Maggie Productions. Conni Ellisor’s works are represented by LeDor Publishing.

== Works list ==
=== Orchestral Works ===
- Blackberry Winter - solo dulcimer and strings
- Broad Band of Light - solo dulcimer and orchestra
- Concerto for Marimba, Percussion, and Strings
- Conversations In Silence - string orchestra
- Diaspora - orchestra
- No Place To Get To - strings, English horns, guitar (also available for string quartet, guitar, and English horn or clarinet)
- Nuages de la Nuit - violin, bass, two guitars, and strings
- Rhapsody for Viola - solo viola, strings, single winds, trumpet, percussion
- Sea Without A Shore - marimba, five percussion, and orchestra
- The Bass Whisperer - solo electric bass and orchestra (written with Victor L. Wooten)
- The Bell Witch Ballet - orchestra
- Tres Danzas De Vida - orchestra
- Whiskey Before Breakfast: Partita for Orchestra and Bluegrass Band

=== Chamber Music Works ===
- Awake at Night - string quartet
- Beloved Enemy - solo voice and strings (written with Gretchen Peters)
- Wind From The Mountain - brass ensemble and percussion

=== Wind Ensemble Works ===
- Keepers Of This House
- Concerto for Marimba, Percussion, and Wind Ensemble

=== Educational Works (for young string orchestra) ===
- Air for the Duchess
- Bell Witch Dances
- Fiddlers on the Hudson
- Poughkeepsie Blues
- Rowing Under a Hudson Moon
- River that Runs Two Ways
- Fort of Shadows
- Rousing Rip van Winkle

=== Film Scores ===
- All Saints (Sony/Affirm)

== Educator ==
Ellisor has written multiple works for the Arlington (NY) High School Philharmonia Orchestra and recently completed a three-year residency with Stringendo, a nonprofit community strings program in upstate New York. The partnership has resulted in seven new works for varying levels of string orchestra.

== Contemporary jazz ==
Ellisor has also had a career as a contemporary jazz recording artist. Her Night at the Museum album, one of four solo albums she’s released, climbed to #13 on Billboard’s Adult Alternative chart. Her studio albums and live performances have both garnered critical praise. “While the pieces all have a contemporary, accessible feel, the consistent classical nuances help maintain the warmth and humanity that make this such a special collection of music,” wrote a critic for the Exclusive Adult Music Review. Venerable Nashville music critic Robert Oermann encouraged readers to attend an upcoming concert, commenting that “Conni and her all-star group combine classical training with contemporary melodies. Her performances are soundtracks for mental movies that transport the listener to parts unknown.”
