= There is a fountain filled with blood =

Hymn written by William Cowper

Praise for the Fountain Opened
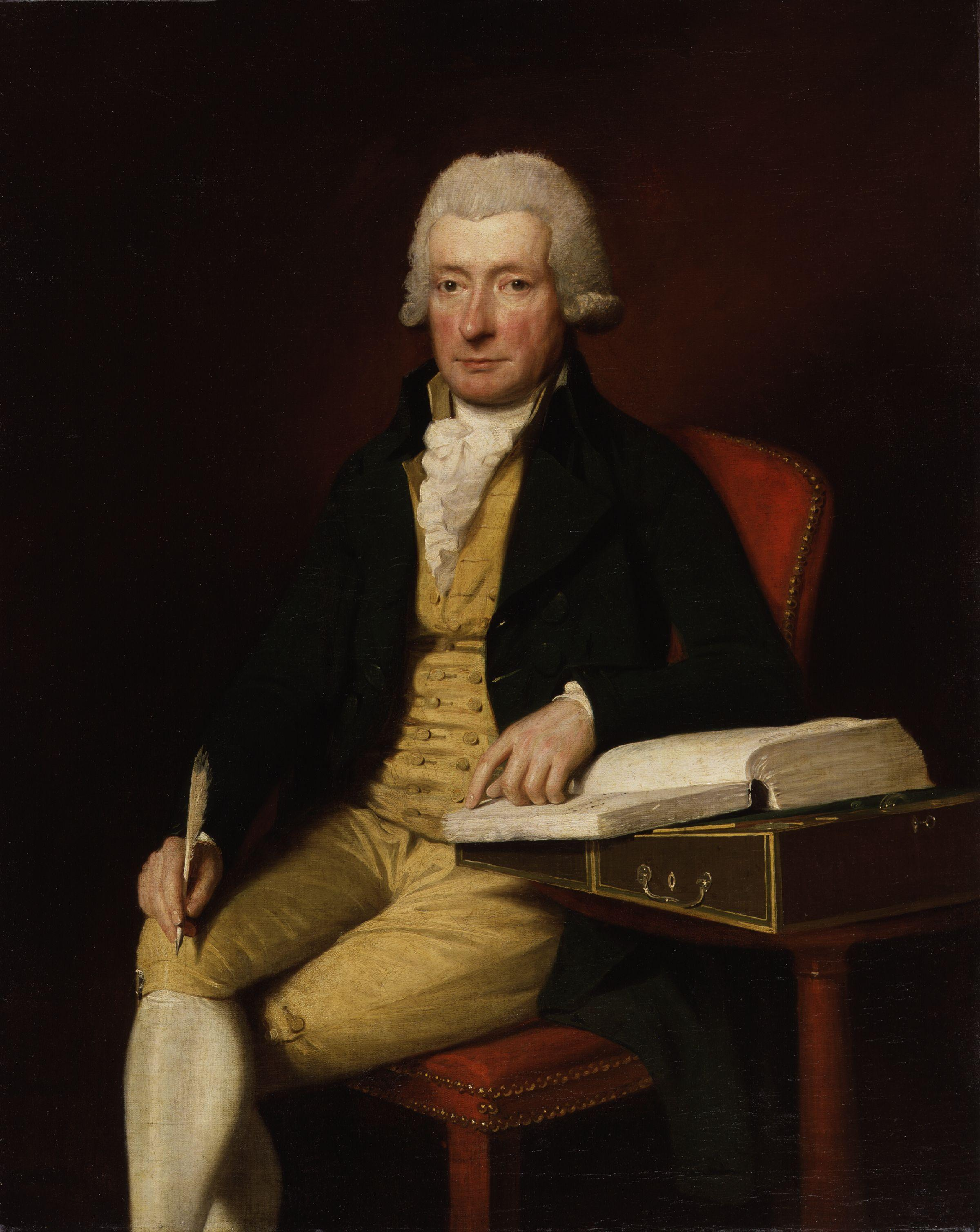
- William Cowper
- Genre: Hymn
- Written: 1772
- Text: by William Cowper
- Based on: Zechariah 13:1
- Meter: 8.6.8.6
- Melody: "Cleansing Fountain" and others

"Praise for the Fountain Opened", commonly known by its first line, "There is a fountain filled with blood," is a hymn written by William Cowper. It was one of the first hymns he wrote after his first major bout of depression.

== Lyrics ==
There is a fountain filled with blood
Drawn from Immanuel's veins;
And sinners, plunged beneath that flood,
Lose all their guilty stains:
Lose all their guilty stains,
Lose all their guilty stains;
And sinners, plunged beneath that flood,
Lose all their guilty stains.

The dying thief rejoiced to see
That fountain in his day;
And there may I, though vile as he,
Wash all my sins away:
Wash all my sins away,
Wash all my sins away;
And there may I, though vile as he,
Wash all my sins away.

Dear dying Lamb, Thy precious blood
Shall never lose its pow'r,
Till all the ransomed Church of God
Be saved, to sin no more:
Be saved, to sin no more,
Be saved, to sin no more;
Till all the ransomed Church of God
Be saved to sin no more.

E'er since by faith I saw the stream
Thy flowing wounds supply,
Redeeming love has been my theme,
And shall be till I die:
And shall be till I die,
And shall be till I die;
Redeeming love has been my theme,
And shall be till I die.

When this poor lisping, stamm'ring tongue
Lies silent in the grave,
Then in a nobler, sweeter song
I'll sing Thy pow'r to save:
I'll sing Thy pow'r to save,
I'll sing Thy pow'r to save;
Then in a nobler, sweeter song
I'll sing Thy pow'r to save.
