= Selah (group) =

American contemporary Christian music group

- Origin: Nashville, Tennessee, U.S.
- Genres: Contemporary Christian, gospel
- Years active: 1997–present
- Label: Curb
- Members: Amy Perry; Allan Hall; Todd Smith
- Past members: Nicol Sponberg; Melodie Crittenden
- Website: selahonline.com

Selah is a contemporary Christian vocal trio consisting of Todd Smith, Allan Hall, and Amy Perry.

== Group history ==
=== 1997–2004: Original lineup ===
Selah was originally formed by brother and sister, Todd and Nicol Smith (now Nicol Sponberg), along with friend Allan Hall. The group quickly gained success with the release of their first album, Be Still My Soul, in 1999. They became known for transforming old Christian hymns into a more modern style and with their powerful voices and beautiful harmonies. Todd and Nicol, who spent their childhood in Subsaharan Africa, brought many African elements to their songs as well. They are as comfortable singing in Kituba, as they are in English. Todd gives credit for his music career to his missionary upbringing. "I've been singing in front of people since I was three," he said. "My parents are missionaries. When we came back to the United States, we had to visit each church that sponsored us. That was a good training ground." They also did well-known covers of already-famous songs such as "You Raise Me Up" by Secret Garden and "Bless the Broken Road" by Marcus Hummon. Selah went on to win a Dove Award for their debut album.

Their second album Press On was released in 2001, and also won a Dove Award, along with many nominations for individual songs in the album.

In April 2000, Nicol Smith released her self-titled solo debut on Curb Records. She met and married Greg Sponberg in 2003. Nicol Sponberg released her second solo album, Resurrection (Curb Records), in 2004. The single "Crazy In Love" crossed over to the secular Adult Contemporary charts while songs like "Safe" continued to earn her airplay on Christian radio. Todd also produced a solo album, Alive, in 2004.

=== 2005–present ===
Nicol left the group in 2004 to pursue a solo career, and for most of 2005 Melodie Crittenden sang with the group.

The 2006 Bless the Broken Road album was a project that teamed original Selah members Allan Hall and Todd Smith with a wide variety of guest singers.

After auditioning 15 female vocalists, Amy Perry became a full-time member based on her vocal abilities and spirituality. Allan Hall also began to get a more active singing role, from originally being the band's accompanist.

Hope of the Broken World, was released on August 23, 2011, with Curb Records. Smith recorded the solo song "Broken Praise" on the various artists compilation album Music Inspired by "The Story" and the album won the "Special Event Album of the Year" on the 43rd GMA Dove Awards in 2012. He performed the song on the awards show. Smith wrote a song called "I Will Carry You" after Audrey Caroline died. "I Will Carry You" is dedicated to the memory of Audrey Caroline Smith.

In 2014, Selah released You Amaze Us. The title track debuted at No. 1 on Billboard's Christian Soft AC chart, becoming the first song in the history of the chart to do so. "You Amaze Us” spent a concurrent 12 weeks at No. 1 on the Christian Soft AC chart.

In 2014, Amy Perry and Allan Hall also released solo albums: Glory All Around (Perry) and Work of Love (Hall).

== Key people ==
=== Todd Smith ===
Todd Smith
- Born: James Todd Smith
- Genres: CCM, Christian rock
- Occupations: Singer, songwriter
- Years active: 1997–present
- Label: Curb
- Website: toddsmithonline.wordpress.com

James Todd Smith (who goes by Todd Smith) is an American singer and founding member of Selah. He remains an original member since its founding in 1997.

Smith grew up the son of missionaries in Zaire, Africa (now the Democratic Republic of the Congo) in a home built by his grandparents, who had been missionaries to the continent since the 1930s. His grandfather worked as a dentist in the United States before moving to Zaire. Smith's father was born in Africa, but later moved to Detroit, Michigan. Both Smith's grandparents died in Africa. Smith's family home burned to the ground when he was five. After the fire, his father felt a call to the mission field of Africa. Smith's father moved his mother, three siblings, and himself from Detroit, Michigan, to Africa. His family remained there for the next eight years. Smith has remarked that he never questioned his Biblical teaching. Smith gives credit for his music career to his missionary upbringing. "I've been singing in front of people since I was three," he said. "My parents are missionaries. When we came back to the United States, we had to visit each church that sponsored us. That was a good training ground." Smith is married to Angie Smith and they have four daughters. They had one other daughter named Audrey, who was born in April 2008 and died a few hours later due to cardiac issues. Angie has written two books, I Will Carry You: The Sacred Dance of Grief and Joy and What Women Fear: Walking in Faith that Transforms.

Selah was originally formed by brother and sister, Todd and Nicol Smith, along with friend Allan Hall. Smith also worked on a solo project. His debut album Alive was released on August 10, 2004, with Curb Records. The album steered from the common sound Selah offered, better known for well integrated harmonies, singing hymns and melodic ballads. A passion for the sound of rock music was more of what Smith had in mind when working on this album. Bands such as Boston, Foreigner, Journey, and Genesis influenced the sound in Alive. This has been his only solo release to date.

Smith continues to work with Allan Hall and Amy Perry, current members of Selah.

== Discography ==
=== Albums ===
==== Studio albums ====
Year	Album details	Peak chart positions		Certifications
Year	Album details	US	US Christ	Certifications
1999	Be Still My Soul: Released: May 18, 1999; Label: Curb Records; Format: CD, DI	—	24	
2001	Press On: Released: June 12, 2001; Label: Curb Records; Format: CD, DI	—	23	
2002	Rose of Bethlehem: Released: October 15, 2002; Label: Curb Records; Format: CD, DI	—	16	
2004	Hiding Place: Released: May 25, 2004; Label: Curb Records; Format: CD, DI	61	2	RIAA: Gold
2005	Greatest Hymns: Released: August 23, 2005; Label: Curb Records; Format: CD, DI	117	3	
2006	Bless the Broken Road: The Duets Album: Released: August 8, 2006; Label: Curb Records; Format: CD, DI	43	1	
2009	You Deliver Me: Released: August 25, 2009; Label: Curb Records; Format: CD, DI	66	4	
2011	Hope of the Broken World: Released: August 23, 2011; Label: Curb Records; Format: CD, DI	87	4	
2014	You Amaze Us: Released: August 19, 2014; Label: Curb Records; Format: CD, DI	59	3	
2017	Unbreakable: Released: March 24, 2017; Label: Curb Records; Format: CD, DI	132	5	
2019	Firm Foundation: Released: November 1, 2019; Label: Integrity Music; Format: CD, DI	—	49	
2020	Step Into My Story: Released: June 11, 2020; Label: 3Cre8tive; Format: CD, DI			
2023	At This Table: A Christmas Album: Released: December 8, 2023; 3Cre8tive; Format: CD, DI	—	—	

==== Compilations ====
Year	Album details	Peak chart positions
Year	Album details	US Christ
2007	Timeless: The Selah Collection: Released: October 9, 2007; Label: Curb Records; Format: CD, DI	—
2016	Greatest Hymns, Vol. 2: Released: August 26, 2016; Label: Curb Records; Format: CD, DI	8
2018	You Raise Me Up: Greatest Hits: Released: November 2, 2018; Label: Curb Records; Formats: CD, DI	—

=== Singles ===
Year	Title	Peak positions			Album
Year	Title	US Christ.	Christ Airplay	US Christ AC	Album
2004	"You Raise Me Up"	2		1	Hiding Place
2005	"All My Praise"	22		19	Hiding Place
2006	"Bless the Broken Road"	5		5	Bless the Broken Road: The Duets Album
2006	"Mary Sweet Mary"	26		9	Bless the Broken Road: The Duets Album
2009	"Hosanna"	30		27	You Deliver Me
2010	"Unredeemed"	38		—	You Deliver Me
2010	"You Deliver Me"	46		—	You Deliver Me
2011	"Were You There"	45		—	Press On
2012	"I Turn To You"	16		12	Hope of the Broken World
2013	"It Must Be You (Moses)"	36		—	non-album single
2014	"You Amaze Us"	28	22	21	You Amaze Us
2017	"I Got Saved"	34	—	—	Unbreakable

=== Other appearances ===
- Grace, Jim Brickman: "Be Thou Near to Me"
- Church in the Wildwood: Cherished Hymns, Gaither Homecoming: "Take My Hand, Precious Lord/Just a Closer Walk With Thee"

== Dove Awards and nominations ==
Year	Category	Nominated work	Result
2000	Inspirational Album of the Year	Be Still My Soul	Won
2002	Inspirational Album of the Year	Press On	Won
2002	Traditional Recorded Gospel Song	"Hold On"	Won
2002	Inspirational Recorded Song of the Year	"Wonderful, Merciful Savior"	Nominated
2002	Group of the Year		Nominated
2003	Group of the Year		Nominated
2005	Artist of the Year		Nominated
2005	Group of the Year		Nominated
2005	Song of the Year	"You Raise Me Up"	Nominated
2005	Inspirational Recorded Song of the Year	"You Raise Me Up"	Nominated
2005	Inspirational Album of the Year	Hiding Place	Won
2005	Worship Song of the Year	"I Bless Your Name"	Nominated
2006	Inspirational Album of the Year	Bless the Broken Road: The Duets Album	Won
2006	Inspirational Recorded Song of the Year	"All My Praise"	Nominated
2006	Inspirational Album of the Year	Greatest Hymns	Nominated
2006	Special Event Album of the Year	WOW Christmas (Green)	Nominated
2006	Worship Song of the Year	"Be Thou My Vision"	Nominated
2007	Song of the Year	"Bless the Broken Road"	Nominated
2007	Pop/Contemporary Recorded Song of the Year	"Bless the Broken Road"	Nominated
2007	Inspirational Recorded Song of the Year	"Glory"	Nominated
2007	Group of the Year		Nominated
2007	Inspirational Recorded Song of the Year	"Be Thou Near To Me"	Nominated
2012	Inspirational Recorded Song of the Year	Hope of the Broken World	Won
2012	Inspirational Recorded Album of the Year	Hope of the Broken World	Won
2013	Inspirational Recorded Song of the Year	"It Must be You"	Nominated
2014	Inspirational Recorded Song of the Year	"You Amaze Us"	Nominated
