= 'Tis So Sweet to Trust in Jesus =

Christian hymn with music by William J. Kirkpatrick

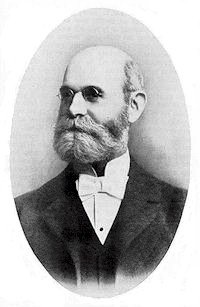
- William J. Kirkpatrick
- Genre: Hymn
- Text: Louisa M. R. Stead
- Based on: Isaiah 12:2
- Meter: 8.7.8.7 with refrain
- Melody: "Trust in Jesus" by William J. Kirkpatrick
- Published: 1882

Tis So Sweet to Trust in Jesus

"'Tis So Sweet to Trust in Jesus" is a Christian hymn with music by William J. Kirkpatrick and lyrics by Louisa M. R. Stead. The lyrics were written in 1882. They appeared in Stead's Songs of Triumph.

The song is included in many hymnals and has been recorded by many artists.

== History ==
The lyrics to "'Tis So Sweet to Trust in Jesus" were written by Louisa M. R. Stead. Stead was born in Dover, England, in 1850 and she converted to Christianity at the age of nine. In 1871, at the age of 21, she immigrated to the United States, residing in Cincinnati, Ohio. That year, she attended a camp meeting in Urbana, Ohio where she felt the call of God to be a missionary to China, a call she had previously felt in her teenage years. However, due to her health, she was unable to travel. In 1875, four years later, she married and moved to New York City, where she had her daughter, Lily.

When her daughter Lily was four years old, Stead and her family were visiting the Long Island Sound when they heard the frantic sounds of a drowning boy. Stead's husband jumped into the sound as an attempt save the child but both died in the incident before both Stead and her daughter's eyes. It is believed that this disaster provided the inspiration for the lyrics of the song.

The hymn first appeared in Songs of Triumph, published in 1882 by the National Publishing Association for the Promotion of Holiness. It was put to music by William J. Kirkpatrick, a Methodist gospel hymn writer who published over sixty hymnals.

== Modern Recordings ==
The song was featured in Word Records's 1989 album, Our Hymns, and was sung by Amy Grant. It went on to peak at the second position on the CCM AC chart and won Country Record Song of the Year at the 1990 GMA Dove Awards.

The hymn was also included in Alan Jackson's 2006 album, Precious Memories. The album topped both the US Christian Albums and US Top Country Albums charts and won a Dove Award for Country Album of the Year in 2007.

== Lyrics ==
'Tis so sweet to trust in Jesus,
Just to take Him at His Word;
Just to rest upon His promise,
Just to know, "Thus says the Lord!"

Refrain:
Jesus, Jesus, how I trust Him!
How I've proved Him o'er and o'er
Jesus, Jesus, precious Jesus!
O for grace to trust Him more!

O how sweet to trust in Jesus,
Just to trust His cleansing blood;
Just in simple faith to plunge me
'Neath the healing, cleansing flood!

Refrain

Yes, 'tis sweet to trust in Jesus,
Just from sin and self to cease;
Just from Jesus simply taking
Life and rest, and joy and peace.

Refrain

I'm so glad I learned to trust Thee,
Precious Jesus, Savior, Friend;
And I know that Thou art with me,
Wilt be with me to the end.

Refrain
