= Nicol Sponberg =

American singer

Nicol Sponberg (née Smith; 1970) is an American contemporary Christian music singer. She was previously a member of the bestselling group Selah.

== Biography ==
Nicol was born in Michigan but spent several years of childhood in South Africa with her parents, who were missionaries. The family spent in the Congo from 1978 to 1986. Because of this, she can sing in the Kituba language. The Smiths moved back to the United States in 1986.

Sponberg graduated from Wheaton College. She and her brother Todd eventually met their future partner in song, Allan Hall. Together they founded the contemporary Christian music group Selah. She released a self-titled debut album, Nicol Smith, in 2000.

Sponberg left Selah in 2004 to further her solo career. She is best known for her 2004 album Resurrection and the title song "Resurrection". The third single from her solo album Resurrection, "Crazy In Love", crossed over to peak at No. 13 on the Billboard Adult Contemporary chart and was one of the Top 30 most played adult contemporary songs of 2006.

== Personal life ==
Sponberg married Greg Sponberg in 2003 after a whirlwind 9.5-week courtship. At 32 years old, Nicol had assumed marriage might not happen for her and was planning a European vacation with a girlfriend when she met Greg. Three weeks later, they were engaged, leading to a quick wedding that prompted her move from Franklin, Tennessee, to Chicago. They have since suffered several miscarriages and the death of their son, Luke, from. SIDS
