= Decades of Worship =

Compilation album by Michael W. Smith
- Released: January 17, 2012
- Genre: CCM, pop
- Length: 63:33
- Label: Reunion

Michael W. Smith chronology
Glory (2011)	Decades of Worship (2012)	Hymns (2014)

Decades of Worship is American Christian singer Michael W. Smith's third compilation album, after The First Decade (1983-1993) and The Second Decade (1993-2003), released in 2012. The album mostly comprises Smith's live and studio worship music in the years 2001–2010. It also includes a remastered version of "Great Is The Lord" from his 1983 debut, Michael W. Smith Project as a bonus track.

== Track listing ==
No.	Title	Writer(s)	Original album	Length
1.	"Awesome God"	Rich Mullins	Worship (DVD)	3:17
2.	"Mighty to Save"	Ben Fielding, Reuben Morgan	A New Hallelujah	7:57
3.	"Agnus Dei"	Michael W. Smith	Worship	6:57
4.	"You Are Holy (Prince of Peace)"	Mark Imboden, Tammi Rhoton	Worship Again	5:11
5.	"Breathe"	Marie Barnett	Worship	6:38
6.	"A New Hallelujah"	Michael W. Smith, Debbie Smith, Paul Baloche	A New Hallelujah	5:24
7.	"Above All"	Lenny LeBlanc, Paul Baloche	Worship	4:27
8.	"I See You"	Rich Mullins	Worship Again	5:23
9.	"Here I Am to Worship"	Tim Hughes	Worship Again	4:53
10.	"Healing Rain"	Michael W. Smith, Martin Smith, Matt Bronleewe	Healing Rain	4:54
11.	"Take Me Over"	Michael W. Smith, Kyle Lee, Bryan Lenox	Wonder	5:37
12.	"Great Is the Lord (Remastered)"	Deborah D. Smith, Michael W. Smith	Project	2:55

== Chart performance ==
Chart (2012)	Peak position
US Billboard 200	99
US Christian Albums (Billboard)	5
