= List of Billboard Top Christian Albums number ones of the 2000s =

US music charts

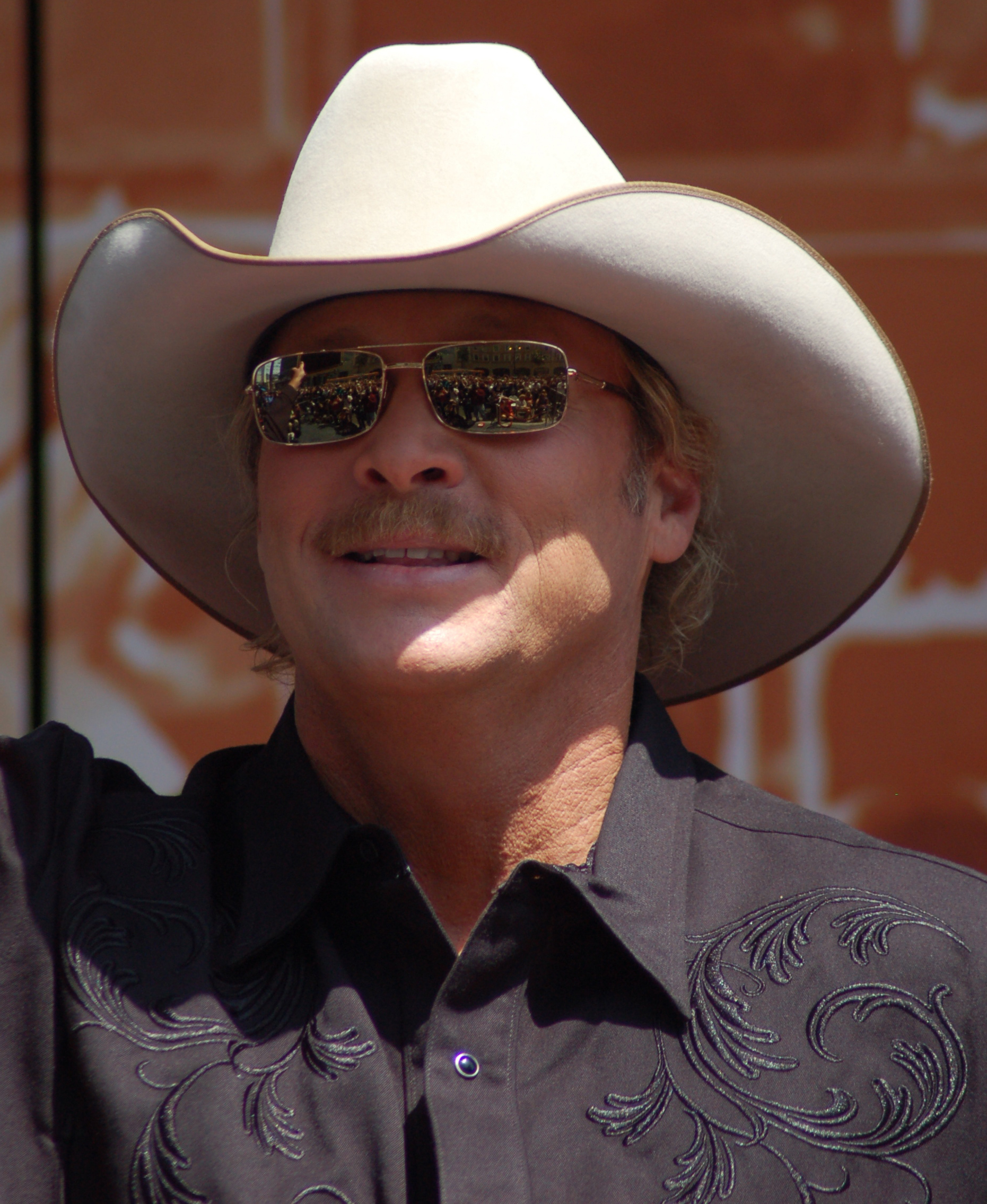
Alan Jackson's (pictured in 2010) Precious Memories was the best-selling album of 2006. Furthermore, it topped the chart for 22 weeks and sold more than 380,000 copies in the US (as of November 2017).

The Billboard Top Christian Albums ranks the best-performing Christian music albums of the week in the United States. The chart was titled Top Contemporary Christian Albums until 2003 and was renamed to the Top Christian Albums on issue date August 16, 2003. The data is compiled by Nielsen SoundScan based collectively on each album's weekly physical (CD, vinyl and cassette) sales. Throughout the decade, a total of 129 albums claimed the top spot of the chart.

WOW albums were the most successful of the decade. Twelve albums spent a total of 75 weeks atop, with two albums topping the year end charts.

== Number-ones ==
Key
†	Best-performing album of respective years

No.	Issue date (Note: The artist, song name, chart date and weeks at number one are those given by Billboard magazine with data compiled by Nielsen SoundScan.)	Album	Artist(s)	Wks.
82	January 1, 2000	WoW 2000: The Year's 30 Top Christian Artists And Songs	Various artists	2
re	January 15, 2000	A Christmas to Remember	Amy Grant	1
re	January 22, 2000	WoW 2000: The Year's 30 Top Christian Artists And Songs	Various artists	3
83	February 12, 2000	What a Wonderful World	Anne Murray	1
re	February 19, 2000	WoW 2000: The Year's 30 Top Christian Artists And Songs	Various artists	1
84	February 26, 2000	The Fundamental Elements of Southtown	P.O.D.	3
85	March 18, 2000	Lay It Down	Jennifer Knapp	1
re	March 25, 2000	The Fundamental Elements of Southtown	P.O.D.	2
86	April 8, 2000	Purpose By Design	Fred Hammond & Radical for Christ	2
re	April 22, 2000	The Fundamental Elements of Southtown	P.O.D.	2
87	May 6, 2000	God Is Working – Live	The Brooklyn Tabernacle Choir	3
88	May 27, 2000	WOW Worship: Orange	Various artists	1
89	June 3, 2000	The Ever Passing Moment	MxPx	1
90	June 10, 2000	The Promise	Plus One	1
91	June 17, 2000	Thankful	Mary Mary	3
92	July 15, 2000	Mountain High... Valley Low (Note: Best-performing album on the Top Contemporary Christian Albums chart of 2000.) †	Yolanda Adams	9
93	September 16, 2000	Love and Freedom	BeBe Winans	1
re	September 23, 2000	Mountain High... Valley Low †	Yolanda Adams	7
94	November 11, 2000	Heart of a Champion	Carman	1
95	November 18, 2000	WoW-2001: The Year's 30 Top Christian Artists And Hits (Note: Best-performing album on the Top Contemporary Christian Albums chart of 2001.) †	Various artists	16
96	March 10, 2001	Songs 4 Worship: Shout To The Lord	Various artists	4
97	April 7, 2001	The Experience	Yolanda Adams	1
re	March 10, 2001	Songs 4 Worship: Shout to the Lord	Various artists	4
98	May 12, 2001	Live in London And More	Donnie McClurkin	1
99	May 19, 2001	Free to Fly	Point of Grace	3
100	June 9, 2001	Oxygen	Avalon	4
re	June 16, 2001	Free to Fly	Point of Grace	4
re	June 23, 2001	Songs 4 Worship: Shout to the Lord	Various artists	2
re	July 7, 2001	Live in London And More	Donnie McClurkin	2
re	July 21, 2001	Songs 4 Worship: Shout to the Lord	Various artists	10
101	September 29, 2001	Satellite (Note: Best-performing album on the Top Contemporary Christian Albums chart of 2002.) †	P.O.D.	7
102	November 17, 2001	Christmas Extraordinaire	Mannheim Steamroller	8
re	January 12, 2002	Satellite †	P.O.D.	8
103	March 9, 2002	The Rebirth of Kirk Franklin	Kirk Franklin	2
re	March 23, 2002	Satellite †	P.O.D.	11
104	June 8, 2002	Legacy...Hymns and Faith	Amy Grant	1
re	June 15, 2002	Satellite †	P.O.D.	7
105	August 3, 2002	Incredible	Mary Mary	5
106	September 7, 2002	Worship	Michael W. Smith	1
re	September 14, 2002	Satellite †	P.O.D.	2
107	September 28, 2002	Let Freedom Ring: Live From Carnegie Hall	Bill & Gloria Gaither	1
108	October 5, 2002	Stanley Climbfall	Lifehouse	2
109	October 13, 2002	WOW Hits 2003	Various artists	3
re	November 9, 2002	Worship	Michael W Smith	3
110	November 30, 2002	WOW Christmas: Red	Various artists	4
re	December 28, 2002	WOW Hits 2003	Various artists	5
111	February 1, 2003	Worship Together: I Could Sing Of Your Love Forever (Note: Best-performing album on the Top Contemporary Christian Albums chart of 2003.) †	Various artists	2
112	February 15, 2003	All About Love	Steven Curtis Chapman	3
re	March 8, 2003	Worship Together: I Could Sing Of Your Love Forever †	Various artists	2
113	March 22, 2003	Fallen	Evanescence	5
114	April 26, 2003	Adoration: The Worship Album	Newsboys	1
re	May 3, 2003	Worship Together: I Could Sing Of Your Love Forever †	Various artists	3
115	May 24, 2003	WOW Worship: Orange	Various artists	1
re	May 31, 2003	Worship Together: I Could Sing Of Your Love Forever †	Various artists	1
116	June 7, 2003	Stacie Orrico	Stacie Orrico	3
117	June 28, 2003	Rise and Shine	Randy Travis	1
re	July 5, 2003	Worship Together: I Could Sing Of Your Love Forever †	Various artists	7
118	August 23, 2003	Almost There	MercyMe	2
119	September 6, 2003	Simple Things	Amy Grant	1
re	September 13, 2003	Almost There	MercyMe	2
120	September 27, 2003	Throne Room	CeCe Winans	1
re	October 4, 2003	Almost There	MercyMe	2
re	October 18, 2003	Worship Together: I Could Sing Of Your Love Forever †	Various artists	1
121	October 25, 2003	The Second Decade: 1993-2003	Michael W. Smith	1
re	November 1, 2003	Almost There	MercyMe	3
122	November 22, 2003	Payable on Death	P.O.D.	4
123	December 20, 2003	WOW Hits 2004	Various artists	3
124	January 10, 2004	Payable on Death	P.O.D.	1
125	January 17, 2004	The Beautiful Letdown (Note: Best-performing album on the Top Christian Albums chart of 2004.) †	Switchfoot	8
126	March 13, 2004	The Passion of the Christ	Soundtrack	7
re	May 1, 2004	The Beautiful Letdown †	Switchfoot	1
127	May 8, 2004	Undone	MercyMe	2
128	May 22, 2004	Wire	Third Day	3
re	June 12, 2004	The Beautiful Letdown †	Switchfoot	2
129	June 26, 2004	Somethin' 'Bout Love	Fred Hammond	1
re	July 3, 2004	The Beautiful Letdown †	Switchfoot	14
130	October 9, 2004	All Things New	Steven Curtis Chapman	1
re	October 16, 2004	The Beautiful Letdown †	Switchfoot	4
131	November 13, 2004	Healing Rain	Michael W. Smith	1
132	November 20, 2004	Mmhmm	Relient K	1
re	November 27, 2004	The Beautiful Letdown †	Switchfoot	1
133	December 4, 2004	Merry Christmas with Love (Note: Best-performing album on the Top Christian Albums chart of 2005.) †	Clay Aiken	6
re	January 15, 2005	The Beautiful Letdown †	Switchfoot	5
134	February 19, 2005	WOW Hits 2005	Various artists	1
re	February 26, 2005	The Beautiful Letdown †	Switchfoot	3
135	March 19, 2005	O God, the Aftermath	Norma Jean	1
re	March 26, 2005	WOW Hits 2005	Various artists	2
136	April 9, 2005	Redemption Songs	Jars of Clay	1
137	April 16, 2005	The Everglow	Mae	1
138	April 23, 2005	WOW Number 1's	Various artists	4
139	May 21, 2005	Rock of Ages...Hymns and Faith	Amy Grant	2
re	June 4, 2005	WOW Number 1's	Various artists	3
140	June 25, 2005	Panic	MxPx	1
re	July 2, 2005	WOW Number 1's	Various artists	1
141	July 9, 2005	MMHMM	Relient K	4
142	August 6, 2005	Mary Mary	Mary Mary	6
143	September 17, 2005	Lifesong	Casting Crowns	2
144	October 1, 2005	Nothing Is Sound	Switchfoot	1
145	October 15, 2005	A Collision	David Crowder Band	1
146	October 22, 2005	Hero	Kirk Franklin	4
147	November 19, 2005	Wherever You Are	Third Day	3
148	December 10, 2005	WOW Hits 2006	Various artists	5
re	January 14, 2006	Hero	Kirk Franklin	4
149	February 11, 2006	Testify	P.O.D.	3
re	March 4, 2006	Hero	Kirk Franklin	2
150	March 18, 2006	Precious Memories (Note: Best-performing album on the Top Christian Albums chart of 2006.) †	Alan Jackson	8
151	May 13, 2006	Coming Up To Breathe	MercyMe	1
152	May 20, 2006	Precious Memories †	Alan Jackson	7
153	July 8, 2006	Define The Great Line	Underoath	4
re	August 5, 2006	Precious Memories †	Alan Jackson	3
154	August 26, 2006	Bless the Broken Road: The Duets Album	Selah	1
re	September 2, 2006	Precious Memories †	Alan Jackson	2
155	September 16, 2006	Restored	Jeremy Camp	1
re	September 23, 2006	Precious Memories †	Alan Jackson	1
156	September 30, 2006	Redeemer	Norma Jean	1
157	October 7, 2006	Turn Around	Jonny Lang	1
158	October 14, 2006	See the Morning	Chris Tomlin	1
159	October 21, 2006	Free to Worship	Fred Hammond	1
160	October 28, 2006	WOW Hits 2007 (Note: Best-performing album on the Top Christian Albums chart of 2007.) †	Various artists	2
161	November 11, 2006	Songs of Inspiration	Alabama	2
162	November 25, 2006	Stand	Michael W. Smith	1
re	December 2, 2006	WOW Hits 2007 †	Various artists	5
re	January 6, 2007	Precious Memories †	Alan Jackson	1
163	January 13, 2007	Oh! Gravity.	Switchfoot	4
164	February 10, 2007	Get Away, Jordan	Ernie Haase & Signature Sound	1
re	February 17, 2007	WOW Hits 2007 †	Various artists	3
165	March 17, 2007	Portable Sounds	tobyMac	2
166	March 24, 2007	Five Score and Seven Years Ago	Relient K	3
167	April 14, 2007	Songs of Inspiration II	Alabama	1
168	April 21, 2007	Southern Weather	The Almost	2
169	May 5, 2007	Anything Worth Saying	Aaron Shust	4
170	June 2, 2007	Beauty From Pain 1.1	Superchick	1
171	June 9, 2007	All of the Above	Hillsong United	1
re	June 16, 2007	Southern Weather	The Almost	3
172	July 7, 2007	Messengers	August Burns Red	1
173	July 21, 2007	Flyleaf	Flyleaf	2
174	August 4, 2007	Secret Weapon	MxPx	1
175	August 11, 2007	How Can We Be Silent	BarlowGirl	1
176	August 18, 2007	True Beauty	Mandisa	1
177	August 25, 2007	Stand	Michael W. Smith	3
178	September 15, 2007	The Altar and the Door (Note: Best-performing album on the Top Christian Albums chart of 2008.) †	Casting Crowns	4
179	October 13, 2007	Remedy	David Crowder	1
re	October 20, 2007	The Altar and the Door †	Casting Crowns	3
180	November 10, 2007	This Moment	Steven Curtis Chapman	1
re	November 17, 2007	The Altar and the Door †	Casting Crowns	3
181	December 8, 2007	All That Is Within Me	MercyMe	3
re	December 29, 2007	The Altar and the Door †	Casting Crowns	1
182	January 5, 2008	The Fight of My Life	Kirk Franklin	10
183	March 15, 2008	Never Going Back To OK	The Afters	2
re	March 29, 2008	The Fight of My Life	Kirk Franklin	1
re	April 5, 2008	The Altar and the Door †	Casting Crowns	1
184	April 12, 2008	Flyleaf	Flyleaf	1
185	April 19, 2008	Hawk Nelson Is My Friend	Hawk Nelson	1
186	April 26, 2008	When Angels and Serpents Dance	P.O.D.	3
187	May 17, 2008	Tell Me What You Know	Sara Groves	2
re	May 31, 2008	Flyleaf	Flyleaf	4
188	June 28, 2008	Beyond Measure	Jeremy Camp	1
re	July 5, 2008	Flyleaf	Flyleaf	1
189	July 12, 2008	To Know That You're Alive	Kutless	1
190	July 19, 2008	The Bird and the Bee Sides	Relient K	2
re	August 2, 2008	Flyleaf	Flyleaf	2
191	August 16, 2008	Revelation	Third Day	3
192	September 6, 2008	Dance or Die	Family Force 5	1
re	September 13, 2008	Revelation	Third Day	1
193	September 20, 2008	Lost in the Sound of Separation	Underoath	1
194	September 27, 2008	Hello Love	Chris Tomlin	3
195	October 18, 2008	New Surrender	Anberlin	1
196	October 25, 2008	WOW Hits 2009 (Note: Best-performing album on the Top Christian Albums chart of 2009.) †	Various artists	1
197	November 8, 2008	The Sound	Mary Mary	1
198	November 15, 2008	A New Hallelujah	Michael W. Smith	1
re	November 22, 2008	WOW Hits 2009 †	Various artists	1
199	November 29, 2008	Peace on Earth	Casting Crowns	7
re	January 17, 2009	WOW Hits 2009 †	Various artists	2
200	January 31, 2009	Audience of One	Heather Headley	2
201	February 14, 2009	Reunion (Vol. One)	Gaither Vocal Band	1
re	February 21, 2009	WOW Hits 2009 †	Various artists	1
202	February 28, 2009	Innocence & Instinct	Red	3
re	March 21, 2009	WOW Hits 2009 †	Various artists	2
203	April 4, 2009	A New Hallelujah	Michael W. Smith	1
204	April 11, 2009	The Power of One	Israel Houghton	2
205	April 25, 2009	10	MercyMe	2
206	May 9, 2009	The Long Fall Back to Earth	Jars of Clay	2
207	May 23, 2009	With Roots Above and Branches Below	The Devil Wears Prada	2
208	June 6, 2009	City of Black & White	Mat Kearney	1
209	June 13, 2009	A Cross: The Earth	Hillsong United	1
210	June 20, 2009	...In Shallow Seas We Sail	Emery	1
re	June 27, 2009	A Cross: The Earth	Hillsong United	1
211	July 4, 2009	The Sound	Mary Mary	1
re	July 11, 2009	City of Black & White	Mat Kearney	1
re	July 18, 2009	The Sound	Mary Mary	2
212	August 1, 2009	The Real Thing	pureNRG	1
213	August 8, 2009	Constellations	August Burns Red	1
re	August 15, 2009	The Sound	Mary Mary	1
214	August 22, 2009	Fearless	Randy Phillips	1
215	August 29, 2009	The Lost Get Found	Britt Nicole	1
re	September 5, 2009	Fearless	Randy Phillips	1
216	September 12, 2009	Awake	Skillet	4
217	October 10, 2009	Church Music	David Crowder	2
218	October 24, 2009	Forget And Not Slow Down	Relient K	1
219	October 31, 2009	WOW Hits 2010	Various artists	3
220	November 21, 2009	Beauty Will Rise	Steven Curtis Chapman	1
221	November 28, 2009	Memento Mori	Flyleaf	1
222	December 5, 2009	Until the Whole World Hears	Casting Crowns	5

== Statistics ==
The following artists have spent at least ten weeks atop the chart, with at least three albums:

Artist	Wks.	Al.	Albums (Weeks)	Ref.
WOW series	75	12	WoW 2000: The Year's 30 Top Christian Artists And Songs (6); WoW-2001: The Year's 30 Top Christian Artists And Hits (16); WOW Worship: Orange (2); WOW Hits 2003 (8); WOW Christmas: Red (4); WOW Number 1's (8); WOW Hits 2004 (3); WOW Hits 2005 (5); WOW Hits 2006 (5); WOW Hits 2007 (10); WOW Hits 2009 (7); WOW Hits 2010 (3)	
P.O.D.	53	5	The Fundamental Elements of Southtown (7); Satellite (35); Payable on Death (5); Testify (3); When Angels & Serpents Dance (3)	
Switchfoot	43	3	The Beautiful Letdown (38); Nothing Is Sound (1); Oh! Gravity. (4)	
Casting Crowns	27	4	Lifesong (2); The Altar and the Door (13); Peace on Earth (7); Until the Whole World Hears (5)	
Mary Mary	19	4	Thankful (3); Incredible (5); Mary Mary (6); The Sound (5)	
MercyMe	17	5	Almost There (9); Undone (2); Coming Up To Breathe (1); All That Is Within Me (3); 10 (2)	
Michael W. Smith	12	5	Worship (4); The Second Decade (1993–2003) (1); Healing Rain (1); Stand (4); A New Hallelujah (2)	
Relient K	11	4	Mmhmm (5); Five Score and Seven Years Ago (3); The Bird and the Bee Sides (2); Forget And Not Slow Down (1)	
Third Day	10	3	Wire (3); Wherever You Are (3); Revelation (4)	

The following albums have spent at least ten weeks atop the chart throughout the decade:

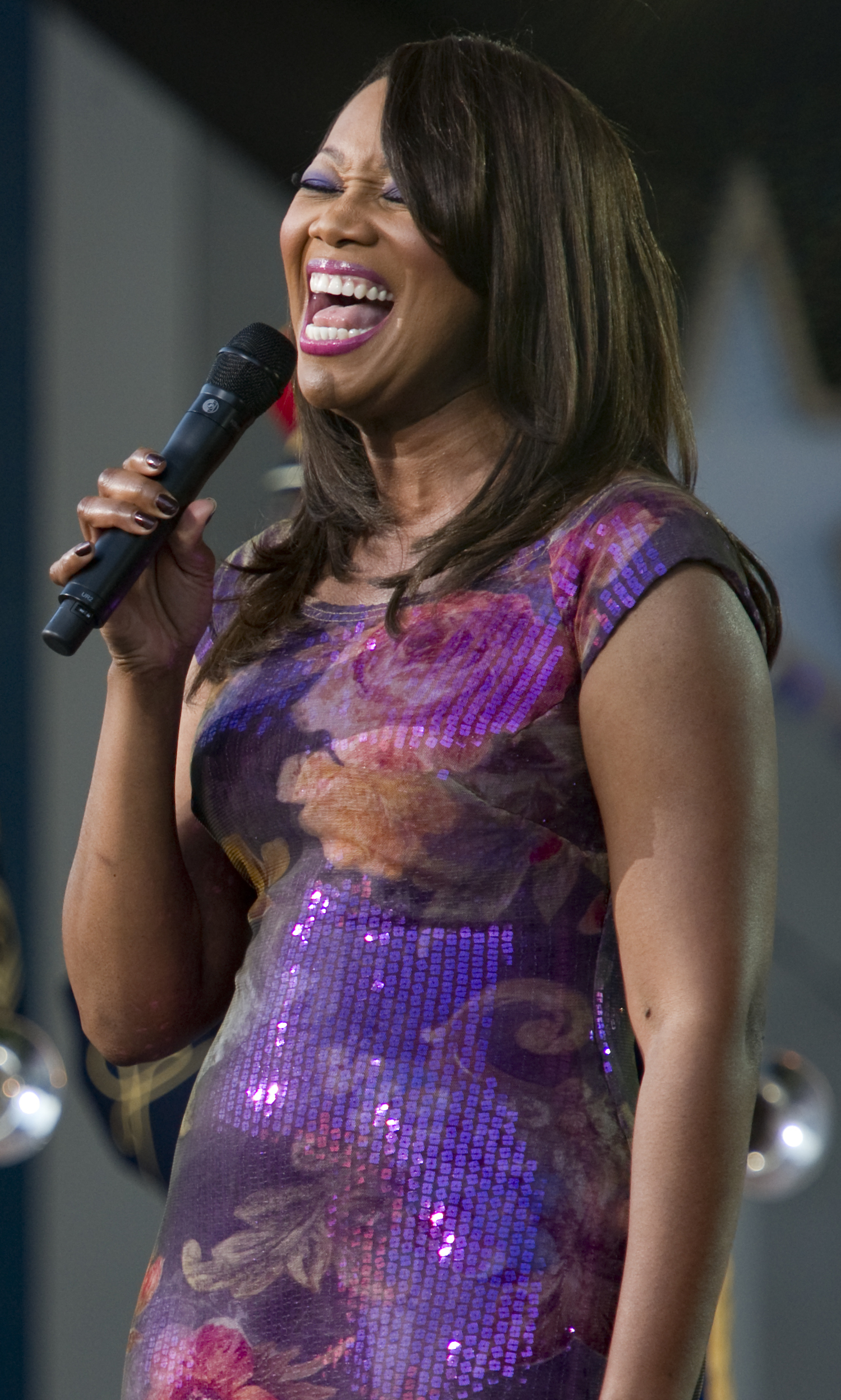
Yolanda Adams's (pictured in 2010) Mountain High... Valley Low topped the chart for 16 consecutive weeks and was the best-performing album of 2000.

Album	Wks.	Artist(s)	Ref.
The Beautiful Letdown	38	Switchfoot	
Satellite	35	P.O.D.	
Precious Memories	22	Alan Jackson	
Songs 4 Worship: Shout To The Lord	20	Various artists	
Mountain High... Valley Low	16	Yolanda Adams	
WoW-2001: The Year's 30 Top Christian Artists And Hits	16	Various artists	
The Altar and the Door	13	Casting Crowns	
The Fight of My Life	11	Kirk Franklin	
WOW Hits 2007	10	Various artists	
Hero	10	Kirk Franklin	
Flyleaf	10	Flyleaf	

== See also ==
- List of number-one Billboard Christian Songs of the 2000s
