= The Second Decade (1993–2003) =

Compilation album by Michael W. Smith
- Released: October 7, 2003
- Recorded: 1995–2003
- Genre: CCM, pop
- Length: 68:45

Michael W. Smith chronology
Worship Again (2002)	The Second Decade (1993–2003) (2003)	Healing Rain (2004)

Professional ratings
Review scores
Source	Rating
AllMusic	5/5 stars
Jesus Freak Hideout	4.5/5 stars

The Second Decade (1993–2003) is Michael W. Smith's eighteenth album. This is Smith's second greatest hits compilation album, picking up where his first greatest hits compilation, The First Decade (1983–1993), left off.

== Track listing ==
No.	Title	Writer(s)	Original album	Length
1.	"Signs"	Wes King, Ryan Smith, Michael W. Smith	new recording	4:37
2.	"Missing Person"		Live the Life (1998)	5:07
3.	"Cry for Love"		I'll Lead You Home (1995)	5:10
4.	"This Is Your Time"		This Is Your Time (1999)	4:29
5.	"Live the Life"		Live the Life (1998)	4:39
6.	"Never Been Unloved"		Live the Life (1998)	4:42
7.	"Love Me Good"		Live the Life (1998)	4:40
8.	"Breakdown" (RrrrB Remix)		I'll Lead You Home (1995)	5:26
9.	"Straight to the Heart"		I'll Lead You Home (1995)	2:46
10.	"I'll Lead You Home"		I'll Lead You Home (1995)	5:20
11.	"Above All" (live version)		Worship (2001)	4:33
12.	"You Are Holy (Prince of Peace)"		Worship Again (2002)	5:20
13.	"Friends 2003" (with Amy Grant, Steven Curtis Chapman, Anointed, Avalon, Point of Grace, Michael Tait of TAIT, Mac Powell and Joy Williams)		Dove Hits 2003	4:56
14.	"Freedom"		Freedom (2000)	3:38
15.	"Raging Sea"	Michael W. Smith, Paul Baloche	new recording	3:15

== Missing hits ==
As with The First Decade (1983–1993), several songs that charted on CCM magazine's CHR, Adult Contemporary, and Inspirational charts were omitted from this compilation due to time constraints. These hit singles were:

- "I'll Be Around" (No. 3 on CHR, No. 1 on AC)
- "A Little Stronger Everyday" (No. 5 on CHR, No. 2 on AC)
- "Someday" (No. 3 on CHR, No. 5 on AC)
- "Jesus Is the Answer" (No. 9 on CHR, No. 4 on AC, No. 11 on Inspo)
- "Christmastime" (No. 12 on AC)
- "Let Me Show You the Way" (No. 16 on CHR, No. 1 on AC)
- "I Will Be Your Friend" (No. 2 on AC, No. 7 on Inspo)
- "I Still Have the Dream" (No. 7 on CHR)
- "Worth It All" (No. 7 on CHR, No. 4 on AC)
- "Breathe" (No. 1 on Inspo)
- "Step by Step/Forever We Will Sing" (No. 21 on Billboard Christian Songs)

== The Second Decade DVD ==
A Limited Edition version of the album was also released, which included The Second Decade DVD. This disc contained the following music videos:

No.	Title	Credits	Length
1.	"Live the Life" (from Live the Life)	Director: Ken Carpenter; Producer: Rod Carpenter	4:35
2.	"Love Me Good" (from Live the Life)	Director: Thom Oliphant; Producer: Lisa Ruffler	3:52
3.	"There She Stands" (from Worship Again)	Director: Ken Carpenter; Producer: Rod Carpenter	4:06
4.	"Secret Ambition" (from i 2 (EYE))	Produced & Directed by Stephen Yake	6:08

The 'extras' section includes a discography, as well as the following features:

No.	Title	Credits	Length
1.	"The Second Decade...A Look Back"	Produced & Directed by Ken Carpenter	6:03
2.	"20 Years of Changing Your World"	Directed & Edited by Ken Carpenter	3:19

== Personnel ==
Signs

- Michael W. Smith – vocals, backing vocals, acoustic piano, keyboards, Hammond B3 organ, acoustic guitar
- Glenn Pearce – electric guitars
- Anthony Sallee – bass
- Raymond Boyd – drums, percussion

Raging Sea

- Michael W. Smith – vocals, acoustic piano
- The Nashville String Machine –orchestra
- David Hamilton – orchestra arrangements and conductor
- Carl Gorodetzky – contractor
- Eberhard Ramm – music copyist
- Nirva Dorsaint – backing vocals

== Production ==
- Michael W. Smith – executive producer, producer (1, 2, 4–7, 11, 12, 14, 15)
- Mark Heimmerman – producer (2, 5–7)
- Patrick Leonard – producer (3, 8–10)
- Bryan Lenox – producer (4, 14)
- Tom Laune – producer (11)
- Brown Bannister – producer (13)
- Rob Burrell – recording (1, 15), mixing (1, 15), remixing (8)
- Hank Williams – mastering
- Jason McArthur – A&R
- Laurie Melick – A&R production
- Scott Hughes – art direction
- Stephanie McBrayer – art direction, styling
- Tim Parker – cover design, graphic design
- Ron Roark – graphic design
- Andrew Southam – photography
- Russ Harrington – additional photography
- Sheila Davis – make-up
- Traci Sgrnoli – hair stylist
- Carol Maxwell – additional hair styling and make-up
- Blanton Harrell Cooke & Corzine – management
- Recorded and Mixed at Skywalker Sound (Marin County, California); Deer Valley Studio and The Sound Kitchen (Franklin, Tennessee).
- Mastered at MasterMix (Nashville, Tennessee).

The Second Decade DVD

- Ken Carpenter – producer, DVD design
- Rod Carpenter – DVD design, DVD authoring
- Stephanie McBrayer – visual media director
- Laurie Melick – production manager

== Chart performance ==
Chart (2003)	Peak position
US Billboard 200	38
US Top Christian Albums (Billboard)	1
