= Above All (song) =

Christian contemporary song

"Above All" is a Christian contemporary song co-written by Paul Baloche and Lenny LeBlanc in 1995.

A popular worship ballad, Michael W. Smith covered it in his live album Worship. Smith also performed it during U.S. President George W. Bush's 2001 inaugural prayer service.

CCM Magazine chose it in its article "CCM Magazine Presents 100 Greatest Songs in Christian Music". Paul Baloche responding to the magazine's choice was quoted as saying: "I'm humbled and blown away that a simple prayer of worship, started at my little piano, found its way to the President of the United States. The possibility that this song could be an encouragement to him is such an honor."

== Awards ==
"Above All" was nominated for "Song of the Year" in both the 2002 and 2003 GMA Dove Awards, and in 2002, Michael W. Smith's version of the same song won "Inspirational Recorded Song of the Year". Baloche was also nominated for "Songwriter of the Year" in 2002 for the song.
