= African Children's Choir =

Africa Choir group formed in 1984

The African Children's Choir is a large choir composed of children ages 7 to 12 from several African nations. Since its inception, the choir has included children from Uganda, Kenya, Rwanda, South Africa, Nigeria, and Ghana. Many of the children have lost one or both parents to AIDS and other poverty-related diseases, and all of them are victims of extreme poverty. The choir is a Christian organization and one of its principles is "instilling Christian principles through teaching and leading by example."

== Background ==
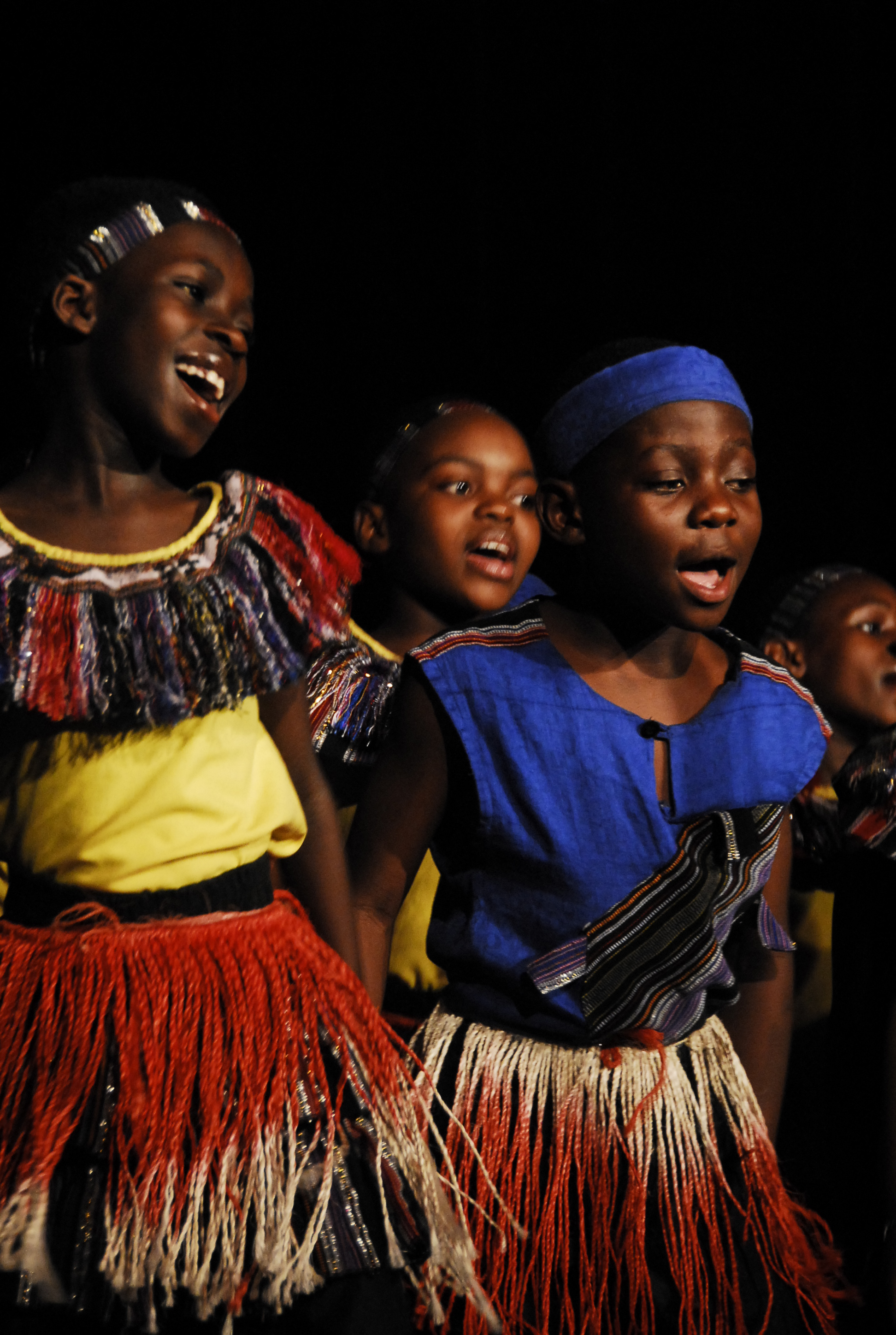
Photo of African Children's Choir

The choir was founded in 1984 by Ray Barnett when he was travelling in war-torn Uganda and gave a small boy a ride from his destroyed home to a safer village. During their journey, the child did what he knew how to do best – he sang. That simple song of dignity and hope became the catalyst for a program that has changed the lives of thousands of children. From there, the African Children's Choir was born. Rallying support from the west, Barnett conducted the first tour, in 1984. As the organization grew so did the needs of the children. The choir began selecting Kenyan children in 1990. By 2002, the first South African choir toured in North America. Music for Life has now facilitated over forty tours through the United States, Canada and the United Kingdom. The choir serves as the main fundraising branch for its parent organization, Music For Life Institute, with proceeds from the choir's work used to fund Christian education and relief efforts for African children affected by poverty and disease.

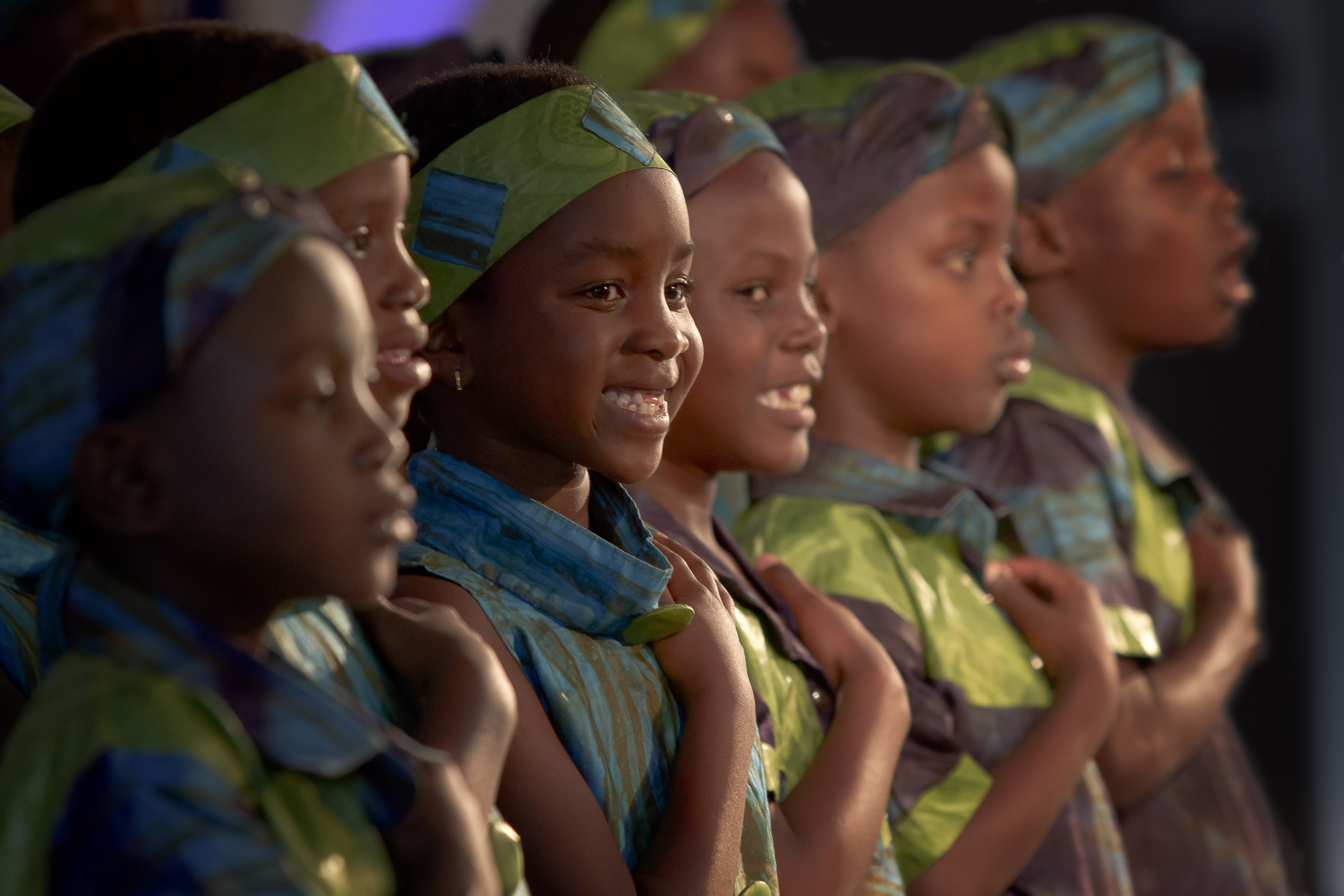
African Children's Choir picture

== Performances ==
The choir has released a number of albums and DVDs over the years, and has performed at major events and venues around the world. The choir has appeared at the British House of Commons and the Pentagon, at some of the world's most prestigious halls, including the Royal Albert Hall, the London Palladium, the International Club of Berlin and the Palais des Beaux Arts in Brussels, Belgium. They also performed with Christian music legend, Bill Gaither, in his Gaither Homecoming series.

In 2005, the choir achieved increased worldwide visibility through several highly publicized performances. They performed at the Live 8 concert in London with Mariah Carey, and were featured on The Tonight Show and The Ellen DeGeneres Show. In 2006, they performed at an event for one.org and before the United Nations for its UNAIDS summit. In December 2006, they made a second appearance on The Tonight Show.

The choir has also recorded songs for the soundtracks of major motion pictures including Oprah Winfrey's Beloved, Hotel Rwanda and Blood Diamond.

The African Children's Choir currently has two choirs on tour in the United Kingdom and Canada. These choirs are composed of children from Uganda.

The choir sang during the Canadian Idol season 4 finale.

On 25 April 2007, they performed as part of American Idol's Idol Gives Back, singing "You Raise Me Up" with Josh Groban. They also performed on the finale of American Idol season 6 at the Kodak Theatre on 23 May 2007.

The African Children's choir was featured in broadcasts and podcasts celebrating 2007 World Party Day.

In 2007, the choir performed with the band Dispatch for three sold-out concerts at Madison Square Garden in New York. The African Children's Choir toured in Australia at the Queensland Youth Symphony at Queensland Music Festival.1999

The choir appears on Michael W. Smith's 2008 album A New Hallelujah, which was live recorded during a worship concert in Houston.

In 2008, the choir sang for former President George W. Bush and recorded with Michael W. Smith. On 29 September 2009, the choir celebrated their 25th Anniversary at the Hotel Vancouver in Vancouver, British Columbia, Canada, where the choir held their first performance 25 years before. Special guests at the event included Bob Geldof, who used to live in Vancouver, where he used to work for the Georgia Straight, Paul Rodgers and Michael McDonald.

Also in 2009, the choir performed for Her Majesty, Queen Elizabeth II and Ugandan President Yoweri Museveni at Commonwealth Day in London, England. Alicia Keys sang with the choir at Black Ball Gala.

The choir sang for US Global Leadership Coalition honoring former First Lady and Senator Hillary Clinton. The choir sang "All You Need is Love" for the Playing for Change Campaign.

In 2010, the choir was featured on A Christmas Cornucopia with Annie Lennox.

The choir were part of the "Commonwealth Band" who performed with the Military Wives at the Diamond Jubilee Concert in 2012. The choir also performed with two other choirs from the United States and France singing "What a Wonderful World" for the Playing for Change campaign.

== Programs in Africa ==
Other than the touring Choir, which is the primary fundraising and awareness program of the organization, Music for Life operate several programs in Africa:

=== Music for Life Centers ===
The Music for Life program runs in 12 Centers, (10 in South Africa, 2 in Uganda), where they work with approximately 50 children in each centre. These children have either been orphaned by AIDS, or have parents that can no longer care for and provide for them, or who are in the care of aged grandparents who are unable to effectively care for them. Music for Life Centers provides music, dance, life skills, as well as nutrition and education (many of the centrrs are actually based in schools).

=== African Children's Choir Primary Schools ===
These are schools that have been developed for African Children's Choir participants. The children in these schools have all been on tour and are selected for their musical ability, academic potential and have been orphaned and/or come from vulnerable situations. The schools build upon the experiences these children have had while on tour and continue to further develop these children's talents and abilities while providing the support of a family.

=== Community Primary Schools ===
These schools are part of the Music for Life Program that assists children (who are not in the choir) and their communities. These schools have either been built by, or have been financially supported by sponsors. The first of these schools was the African Outreach Academy in Uganda, which served as a community support model in 1984 and was the original home of the African Children's Choir.

=== Teachers Training College ===
In Sudan, where the infrastructure was decimated by civil war, Music For Life is rebuilding the educational system by providing training for new teachers throughout the country.

=== 12 Million Orphans ===
12 Million Orphans is an educational campaign representing the over 12 million orphans in sub-Saharan Africa. The program lobbies and cares for some of these children, provides information on this vulnerable sector, and focuses the world's attention on their issues. The main program to reach these children is the Music for Life Centers.
