= Christmastime (Michael W. Smith album) =

Studio album by Michael W. Smith
- Released: October 13, 1998
- Recorded: 1998
- Studios: East Iris Sound, Quad Studios and Sound Stage Studios (Nashville, Tennessee); Deer Valley Studio and Sound Kitchen (Franklin, Tennessee); Westlake D and The Village Recorder (Los Angeles, California); Avatar Studios (New York City, New York); Gaither Studios (Alexandria, Indiana); Abbey Road Studios (London, England); CTS Studios (Wembley, England)
- Genre: Christmas music
- Length: 45:04
- Label: Reunion
- Producers: Brown Bannister; Michael W. Smith

Michael W. Smith chronology
Live the Life (1998)	Christmastime (1998)	This Is Your Time (1999)

Professional ratings
Review scores
Source	Rating
AllMusic	3/5 stars

Christmastime is a studio album by Michael W. Smith. It was his second holiday-themed release, following 1989's Christmas.

== Track listing ==
No.	Title	Writer(s)	Length
1.	"The Happiest Christmas"	(Myles Rudge, Ted Dicks)	3:08
2.	"Kay Thompson's Jingle Bells"	(Kay Thompson, Johnny Mandel, J. Pierpont)	2:17
3.	"Christmastime"	(MWS, Joanna Carlson)	4:15
4.	"Welcome to Our World"	(Chris Rice)	3:28
5.	"Hope of Israel"	(MWS)	3:17
6.	"Medley: Sing We Now of Christmas/O Come, O Come, Emmanuel/Emmanuel"	(MWS)	5:27
7.	"O Christmas Tree (instrumental duet with Phil Keaggy)"		3:53
8.	"The Christmas Waltz (with Sandi Patty)"	(Sammy Cahn, Jules Styne)	3:00
9.	"We Three Kings"		3:22
10.	"Medley: Away in a Manger/Child in the Manger"		5:06
11.	"Carols Sing (Paul and Martha Puckett)"		2:14
12.	"Medley: I Saw Three Ships/Joy to the World"		5:37

== Personnel ==
- Michael W. Smith – vocals (1–4, 6, 8, 10), acoustic piano (3–7, 9–12), programming (3), arrangements (6, 7, 9, 10, 12), keyboards (11)
- Shane Keister – acoustic piano (1, 2, 8), orchestrations (8)
- Blair Masters – keyboards (11)
- Jerry Kimbrough – guitar (1, 2, 8)
- Phil Keaggy – guitars (7)
- David Hungate – bass guitar (1, 2, 8)
- Leland Sklar – bass guitar (6)
- Harold Jones – drums (1, 2, 8)
- Steve Brewster – drums (3)
- Paul Leim – drums (6)
- Eric Darken – percussion (7, 12)
- Mark Douthit – alto saxophone (2, 8)
- Sam Levine – alto saxophone (2, 8)
- Doug Moffett – tenor saxophone (2, 8)
- Denis Solee – tenor saxophone (2, 8)
- Ernie Collins – trombone (2, 8)
- Barry Green – trombone (2, 8)
- Chris McDonald – trombone (2, 8), horn arrangements (2, 8)
- Jeff Bailey – trumpet (2, 8)
- Mike Haynes – trumpet (2, 8)
- Steve Patrick – trumpet (2, 8)
- George Tidwell – trumpet (2, 8)
- Jerry O'Sullivan – Uilleann pipes (12), Highland pipes (12), tin whistle (12)
- Ronn Huff – orchestration (1, 2, 4, 5, 6)
- Tom Howard – orchestration (3, 10), choir arrangement (3, 10)
- Carl Marsh – orchestration (6, 7, 12)
- The London Session Orchestra – orchestra (1–8, 10, 12)
- Gavyn Wright – concertmaster (1–8, 10, 12)
- Mike Casteel – music copyist
- Stephen Danenberg – music copyist
- Ric Domenico – music copyist
- Wally Dunbar – music copyist
- Michael Goode – music copyist
- Tom McAninch – music copyist
- Lisa Cochran – backing vocals (2, 8)
- Tim Davis – backing vocals (2, 8), BGV arrangements (2, 8)
- Mark Ivey – backing vocals (2, 8)
- Amy Joy Weimer – backing vocals (2, 8)
- Chris Harris – backing vocals (6)
- Wayne Kirkpatrick – backing vocals (6)
- Chris Rodriguez – backing vocals (6)
- Lori Wilshire – backing vocals (6)
- Sandi Patty – vocals (8)
- Anna Smith – vocal (10)
- The Hollywood Presbyterian Choir – adult choir (3, 6, 11)
- Fred Bock – Hollywood Presbyterian Choir director (3, 6, 11)
- The American Boyhood Choir – boychoir (3, 6, 10, 11)
- James Litton – American Boyhood Choir director (3, 6, 10, 11)

Production

- Brown Bannister – producer for RBI Productions
- Michael W. Smith – co-producer
- Steve Bishir – engineer, mixing (4–7, 9, 11, 12)
- Al Schmitt – mixing (1, 2, 8)
- Bill Deaton – mixing (3, 10)
- Hank Nirider – assistant engineer, mix assistant (11, 12)
- Charlie Warwick – assistant engineer
- Bill Smith – mix assistant (1, 2, 8)
- Fred Paragano – mix assistant (3, 10)
- Todd Gunnerson – mix assistant (4–7, 9)
- Russ Long – additional engineer
- Gary Paczosa – additional engineer
- Jess Sutcliffe – additional engineer
- Douglas Blair – orchestra recording engineer
- Erik Jordan – orchestra recording engineer
- Alex Marcou – orchestra recording engineer
- Mark Tucker – orchestra recording engineer
- Doug Sax – mastering at The Mastering Lab (Hollywood, California)
- Traci Sterling Bishir – production manager
- Diana Lussenden – art direction
- Ben Pearson – photography
- Janice Booker – design for Altar Ego Design

== Chart performance ==
=== Weekly charts ===
Chart (1998)	Peak position
US Billboard 200	90
US Top Christian Albums (Billboard)	5
US Top Holiday Albums (Billboard)	4
