= Hymns (Michael W. Smith album) =

Studio album by Michael W. Smith
- Released: March 24, 2014
- Length: 53:00
- Label: Provident
- Producer: Kyle Lee, Jim Daneker

Michael W. Smith chronology
| Decades of Worship (2012) | Hymns (2014) | Sovereign (2014) |

Hymns is a studio album by Christian recording artist Michael W. Smith, released exclusively at Cracker Barrel Old Country Store on March 24, 2014. The album consists of Smith's rendition of traditional hymns, including many that he sang at church when he was young.

The album won 2014 Dove Award for "Inspirational Album of the Year".

This was Smith's last album to be distributed by Provident before beginning his new contract with Capitol CMG.

== Commercial performance ==
The album debuted at No. 24 on the US Billboard 200, selling 12,000 copies in its first week of release. According to Nielsen SoundScan, it was the best-selling Christian music album for the week of April 19, 2014.

== Track listing ==
| No. | Title | Writer(s) | Length |
|---|---|---|---|
| 1. | "The Old Rugged Cross" | George Bennard | 4:02 |
| 2. | "My Jesus, I Love Thee" | William R. Featherston | 3:20 |
| 3. | "Were You There" | C. Winfred Douglas | 3:21 |
| 4. | "Victory in Jesus" | E.M. Bartlett | 3:46 |
| 5. | "How Great Thou Art" | Stuart K. Hine | 4:21 |
| 6. | "Just As I Am" | Charlotte Elliott | 3:12 |
| 7. | "Near the Cross" | Fanny Crosby | 3:36 |
| 8. | "It is Well" | Horatio Spafford | 5:05 |
| 9. | "Softly and Tenderly" | Will L. Thompson | 3:20 |
| 10. | "When I Survey the Wondrous Cross" | Isaac Watts | 3:34 |
| 11. | "What a Friend We Have in Jesus" | Joseph M. Scriven | 4:07 |
| 12. | "Wonderful, Merciful Savior" (Selah cover) | Dawn Rodgers and Eric Wyse | 3:20 |
| 13. | "Great Is Thy Faithfulness" | Thomas O. Chisholm and William M. Runyan | 3:53 |
| 14. | "God of Our Fathers" | Daniel C. Roberts | 2:23 |
| 15. | "The Lord Bless You and Keep You" | Peter C. Lutkin | 1:40 |
| Total length: | | | 53:00 |

== Personnel ==
- Michael W. Smith – lead vocals, acoustic piano (1–14), Hammond B3 organ (1–5, 10, 14)
- Kyle Lee – keyboards (1–5, 10, 14), programming (1–5, 10, 14), backing vocals (1–5, 10, 14)
- Jim Daneker – keyboards (6–13), programming (6–13), Hammond B3 organ (6–13), accordion (6–13), steel guitar (6–13), bass (6–13), cello (6–13), strings (6–13), brass (6–13), backing vocals (6–13)
- Cody Kilby – acoustic guitar (1–5, 10, 14)
- Kyle Aaron – acoustic guitar (6–13), banjo (6–13), mandolin (6–13), ukulele (6–13), fiddle solo (6)
- Micah Wilshire – electric guitars (6–13)
- Rob Ickes – dobro (1–5, 10, 14)
- Andy Leftwich – mandolin (1–5, 10, 14), fiddle (1–5, 10, 14)
- Jake Johnson – upright bass (1–5, 10, 14)
- Tony Morra – drums (6–13)
- Paul Cookson – orchestral percussion (6–13)
- Elliot Eicheldinger – backing vocals (1–5, 10, 14)
- Roger Jaeger – backing vocals (1–5, 10, 14)
- Haley Johnson – backing vocals (1–5, 10, 14)
- Richard Jordan – backing vocals (1–5, 10, 14)
- Julie Kelitonic – backing vocals (1–5, 10, 14)
- Lara Landon – backing vocals (1–5, 10, 14)
- Shelly Lee – backing vocals (1–5, 10, 14)
- Racheal Mann – backing vocals (1–5, 10, 14)
- Jared Martin – backing vocals (1–5, 10, 14)
- Ryan Rose – backing vocals (1–5, 10, 14)
- Jessie Sellers – backing vocals (1–5, 10, 14)
- Morgan Shirley – backing vocals (1–5, 10, 14)
- Rhyan Shirley – backing vocals (1–5, 10, 14)
- Johnathan Warren – backing vocals (1–5, 10, 14)
- Janice Gaines – backing vocals (3)
- Gale Mayes – backing vocals (3)
- Debi Selby – backing vocals (3)
- Laura Cooksey – backing vocals (6–13)
- Phil King – backing vocals (6–13)
- Katie Rees – backing vocals (6–13)
- Stephen Rees – backing vocals (6–13), fiddle solo (11)
- Mercy Stevens – backing vocals (6–13)
- The Brentwood Baptist Worship Choir – choir (14)

== Production ==
- Chaz Corzine – executive producer
- Greg Ham – executive producer
- Jim Daneker – producer (1–14), recording (6–13), mixing (6–13)
- Kyle Lee – producer (1–14), recording (1–5, 10, 14), mixing (1–5, 10, 14, 15)
- Michael W. Smith – producer (15)
- Brad Pooler – engineer (15)
- Bob Boyd – mastering
- Rebecca Jones – packaging coordinator
- Russ Harrington – photography

Studios

- Recorded at The Whine Cellar (Spring Hill, Tennessee).
- Engineered at The Court (Franklin, Tennessee).
- Mixed at The Whine Cellar and The Court.
- Mastered at Ambient Digital (Houston, Texas).

== Chart performance ==
| Chart (2014) | Peak position |
|---|---|
| US Billboard 200 | 25 |
| US Christian Albums (Billboard) | 1 |
| US Independent Albums (Billboard) | 5 |
