= Worship Again =

Live album by Michael W. Smith
- Released: October 22, 2002
- Recorded: 2002
- Venue: Southeast Christian Church, Middletown, Kentucky
- Genre: Contemporary worship music
- Length: 64:11
- Label: Reunion
- Producer: Michael W. Smith

Michael W. Smith chronology
Worship (2001)	Worship Again (2002)	The Second Decade (1993–2003) (2003)

Professional ratings
Review scores
Source	Rating
AllMusic	3/5 stars
Christianity Today	4/5 stars
Jesus Freak Hideout	4/5 stars

Worship Again is Michael W. Smith's seventeenth album. This is Smith's second album of worship music. The bulk of the album was recorded on July 19, 2002, at Southeast Christian Church in Middletown, Kentucky before a live audience. The album won Smith his third Grammy Award for Best Pop/Contemporary Gospel Album at the 46th Annual Grammy Awards.

== Track listing ==
No.	Title	Writer(s)	Length
1.	"Step by Step"/"Forever We Will Sing"	"Step by Step" – David "Beaker" Strasser; "Forever We Will Sing" – MWS	6:22
2.	"You Are the Lord"	MWS, Debbie Smith	4:16
3.	"The Wonderful Cross"	Chris Tomlin, Isaac Watts, JD Walt, Jesse Reeves	6:21
4.	"Ancient Words"	Lynn DeShazo	4:36
5.	"Lord Have Mercy" (featuring Sarah McIntosh)	Steve Merkel, Lloyd Larson	5:15
6.	"The Sacred Romance" (instrumental)	MWS	1:45
7.	"I Can Hear Your Voice"	MWS, D. Smith, Whitney Smith	3:33
8.	"I Give You My Heart"	Reuben Morgan	3:25
9.	"There Is None Like You"	Lenny LeBlanc	2:09
10.	"I See You"	Rich Mullins	6:56
11.	"You Are Holy (Prince of Peace)"	Marc Imboden, Tammi Rhoton	6:07
12.	"Lord Have Mercy (studio version)" (featuring Amy Grant)	Merkel	4:25
13.	"Here I Am to Worship"	Tim Hughes	4:58
14.	"There She Stands"	MWS, Wes King	4:04

== Music video ==
The video for "There She Stands", is a tribute to the people who suffered in the September 11 attacks.

== Personnel ==
Live set

- Michael W. Smith – lead vocals, acoustic piano
- David Hamilton – keyboards, music director
- Jim Daneker – keyboards, Hammond B3 organ
- Glenn Pearce – electric guitars
- Sarah McIntosh – acoustic guitar, backing vocals, lead vocal (verse 2 on "Lord Have Mercy")
- Brent Milligan – bass, cello
- Raymond Boyd – drums, percussion
- David Davidson – violin, viola
- Skip Cleavinger – Irish flutes, pipes
- Carissima Joseph – backing vocals
- Kristee Mays – backing vocals
- Calvin Nowell – backing vocals
- Tiffany Palmer – backing vocals
- Daniel Palmore – backing vocals
- Leanne Palmore – backing vocals

Studio cuts (tracks 12–14)

- Michael W. Smith – lead vocals, acoustic piano, keyboards, Hammond B3 organ, acoustic guitars
- Jim Daneker – programming (12, 14)
- Glenn Pearce – electric guitars
- Matt Pierson – bass
- Raymond Boyd – drums
- The Nashville String Machine – orchestra
- Carl Gorodetzky – contractor
- David Hamilton – string arrangements and conductor
- Amy Grant – lead vocal on verse 2 of "Lord Have Mercy"
- Carissima Joseph – backing vocals
- Kristee Mays – backing vocals
- Calvin Nowell – backing vocals
- Leanne Palmore – backing vocals
- Jerard Woods – backing vocals
- Jovaun Woods – backing vocals

Production

- Michael W. Smith – producer
- Eric Elwell – event producer
- Joey Ciccoline – event manager
- Shane Hamill – production manager, monitor engineer
- Beverly Bartsch – production assistant
- Josh Fieldhouse – lighting and set design
- Sean O'Rourke – keyboard technician
- Jan Schneider – drum technician
- Dave Graef – guitar technician
- Jeff Murray – audio technician
- Tommy Rodgers – front of house mix engineer
- Ronnie Brookshire – recording engineer, orchestra recording engineer at Masterfonics Tracking Room, Nashville, Tennessee, mixing at "The Groove Room", Soundstage Studios, Nashville, Tennessee
- Joel Singer – recording engineer
- Rob Burrell – recording engineer, editing,
- "There She Stands" recorded at Deer Valley Studios, Franklin, Tennessee, and Masterfonics Tracking Room, Nashville, Tennessee
- Hank Williams – mastering at MasterMix, Nashville, Tennessee
- Jason McArthur – A&R coordination
- Scott Hughes – art direction
- Laurie Melick – label production coordination
- Arnholt - Fox – graphic design
- Russ Harrington – photography
- Glen Rose – photography
- Jimmy Abegg – cover illustration
- Stephanie McBrayer – creative director, stylist
- Carol Maxwell – hair, make-up

== Charts ==
=== Weekly charts ===
Chart (2002)	Peak position
US Billboard 200	14
US Christian Albums (Billboard)	1

=== Year-end charts ===
Chart (2003)	Position
US Billboard 200	171
