= Healing Rain =

Studio album by Michael W. Smith
- Released: October 26, 2004
- Recorded: 2004
- Studios: Skywalker Sound, Nicasio, CA
- Genres: Contemporary Christian music, pop
- Length: 50:54
- Label: Reunion
- Producers: Michael W. Smith; Matt Bronleewe; Sam Ashworth

Michael W. Smith chronology
| The Second Decade (2003) | Healing Rain (2004) | Stand (2006) |

Professional ratings
Review scores
| Source | Rating |
|---|---|
| AllMusic | 3.5/5 stars |
| CCM Magazine | B |
| Christianity Today | 3.5/5 stars |
| Cross Rhythms | 7/10 squares |
| Jesus Freak Hideout | 3.5/5 stars |
| The Village Voice | D+ |

Healing Rain is Michael W. Smith's nineteenth album, released in 2004 and debuted at No. 11 on the Billboard 200 chart. It is a departure from his previous two albums which are live worship albums. Healing Rain is a pop CCM album, in a similar vein to his 1999 album This Is Your Time. The album was reissued as a DualDisc in 2005. Some of the album's tracks were recorded at George Lucas' Skywalker Sound, located in Marin County, California.

== Track listing ==
| No. | Title | Writer(s) | Length |
|---|---|---|---|
| 1. | "Here I Am" | Michael W. Smith, Martin Smith | 5:10 |
| 2. | "Healing Rain" | Smith, Martin Smith, Matt Bronleewe | 4:59 |
| 3. | "Live Forever" | Smith, Wes King | 5:19 |
| 4. | "Hang On" | Smith, King, Bronleewe | 4:13 |
| 5. | "Fly To The Moon" | Smith, Wayne Kirkpatrick | 5:20 |
| 6. | "Human Spark" | Smith, Dan Hill | 4:50 |
| 7. | "We Can't Wait Any Longer" | Smith, Kirkpatrick | 4:42 |
| 8. | "I Am Love" | Smith, Taylor Sorenson | 3:56 |
| 9. | "Bridge Over Troubled Water" | Paul Simon | 4:44 |
| 10. | "Eagles Fly" | Smith, Kirkpatrick | 3:08 |
| 11. | "All I Want" | Smith, Martin Smith | 4:33 |

DualDisc DVD side
| No. | Title | Length |
|---|---|---|
| 1. | "Entire album in PCM Stereo and 5.1 Digital Surround Sound" |
| 2. | "The Stories Behind Healing Rain" |
| 3. | "Healing Rain Music Video" |
| 4. | "Here I Am Music Video" |
| 5. | "The Second Chance Movie Trailer" |

== Awards ==
In 2005, the album was nominated for a Dove Award for Pop/Contemporary Album of the Year at the 36th GMA Dove Awards. The title song also received three nominations for Song of the Year, Pop/Contemporary Recorded Song of the Year, and Worship Song of the Year.

== Personnel ==
- Michael W. Smith – lead vocals, backing vocals (1, 4–7, 9, 10), piano (1, 2, 5–9, 11), keyboards (1, 5, 6, 7, 11), Hammond B3 organ (1, 2, 3, 5, 6), Wurlitzer electric piano (2, 3, 4, 8, 10), Rhodes (3, 4, 10), programming (7, 11), additional guitars (7)
- Matt Bronleewe – various random additional and supplemental sonic material (2, 3, 4, 10)
- Jeremy Bose – programming (2, 3, 4, 10)
- F. Reid Shippen – additional programming (4, 10)
- Taylor Harris – programming (8)
- Paul Moak – guitars (1), synth pad (2, 3), various sound effects (2, 4, 10), electric guitar (2, 3, 4, 10), EBow guitar (2, 3, 10), pedal steel drone (2), Hammond B3 organ (3, 10), Mellotron (4), vibraphone (4, 10), sitar (10), Moog synthesizer (10), child's piano (10)
- Glenn Pearce – guitars (1, 5, 6, 7, 9, 11)
- Bruce Gaitsch – acoustic guitar (2)
- Sam Ashworth – acoustic guitar (8), electric guitar (8), backing vocals (8)
- Matt Slocum – acoustic guitar (8), electric guitars (8)
- James Gregory – bass (1–4, 10)
- Anthony Sallee – bass (5, 6, 7, 9)
- Jimmie Lee Sloas – bass (8)
- Raymond Boyd – drums (1, 5, 6, 7, 9), percussion (1, 5, 6, 7, 9, 11)
- Lindsay Jamieson – drums (2, 3, 4, 8, 10)
- Ken Lewis – percussion (8)
- The City of Prague Philharmonic Orchestra – strings (2, 3)
- Keith Getty – orchestration and conductor (2, 3)
- Joni McCabe – strings technical production (2, 3)
- Christa Black – violin (7)
- Mark Lekas – cello (8)
- Monisa Angell – viola (8)
- David Angell – violin (8)
- David Davidson – violin (8)
- Charlie Peacock – string arrangement (8)
- Sheree Brown – backing vocals (2)
- Darwin Hobbs – backing vocals (2)
- Leanne Palmore – backing vocals (2)
- Ugandan Children's Choir – choir (7)

Production

- Michael W. Smith – producer at Skywalker Sound, Marion County, California, Deer Valley Studios, Franklin, Tennessee, Dark Horse Recording Studio, Franklin, Tennessee, Ocean Way Nashville, Nashville, Tennessee (1, 5–7, 9, 11)
- Matt Bronleewe – producer at Dark Horse Recording (2–4, 10)
- Sam Ashworth – producer at Blackbird Studio, Art House and Laser Fox Studios, Nashville, Tennessee (8), additional production (7)
- Rob Burrell – engineer, mixing The Fishbowl at Dark Horse Recording (1, 5–7, 9, 11)
- Richie Biggs – engineer (8)
- Taylor Harris – engineer (8)
- Clayton Wood – technical engineer at Skywalker Sound (1, 5–7, 9, 11)
- Marius Perron III – choir engineer at Studio M, San Antonio, Texas (7)
- Judy Kirschner – assistant engineer (1, 5–7, 9, 11)
- Joseph Logsdon – assistant engineer (1, 5–7, 9, 11)
- Marc Meeker – assistant engineer (1, 5–7, 9, 11)
- Michael Modesto – assistant engineer (1–7, 9–11)
- Dann Thompson – assistant engineer (1, 5–7, 9, 11)
- André Zweers – assistant engineer (1, 5–7, 9, 11)
- Aaron Swihart – engineer at Pentavarit, Nashville, Tennessee, Deer Valley Studios (2–4, 10)
- Justin Loucks – additional engineering at The Smoakstack, Nashville, Tennessee (2–4, 10)
- Randy LeRoy – digital editing at Final Stage Mastering, Nashville, Tennessee
- F. Reid Shippen – mixing at Sound Stage Studios, Nashville, Tennessee (2–4, 10)
- Lee Bridges – mixing assistant (2–4, 10)
- Shane D. Wilson – mixing at Pentavarit (8)
- Ted Jensen – mastering at Sterling Sound, New York City
- Michael Blanton – executive producer
- Robert Beeson – executive producer
- Alice Smith – production coordination for Showdown Productions (2–4, 10)
- Michelle Pearson – A&R production
- Stephanie McBrayer – art direction
- Bert Sumner – cover and packaging design for Ground Level Design
- Pamela Springsteen – photography
- Sabrina Poole – hair, make-up
- Maude – stylist

== Chart performance ==
| Chart (2014) | Peak position |
|---|---|
| US Billboard 200 | 11 |
| US Top Christian Albums (Billboard) | 1 |
