= Freedom (Michael W. Smith album) =

Studio album by Michael W. Smith
- Released: November 21, 2000
- Recorded: May–September 2000
- Studio: Deer Valley Studio (Franklin, Tennessee); Windmill Lane Studios (Dublin, Ireland); East Iris Sound, Ocean Way Nashville and Javelina Studios (Nashville, Tennessee)
- Genre: Instrumental
- Length: 40:57
- Label: Reunion
- Producer: Michael W. Smith; Bryan Lenox

Michael W. Smith chronology
This Is Your Time (1999)	Freedom (2000)	Worship (2001)

Professional ratings
Review scores
Source	Rating
AllMusic	4/5 stars
Jesus Freak Hideout	4.5/5 stars

The Acoustic Set - A Live Recording

Live album by Michael W. Smith
- Released: November 21, 2000
- Recorded: June 17, 2000
- Venue: Living Word Church, Middletown, Ohio
- Label: Reunion

Michael W. Smith chronology
This Is Your Time (1999)	The Acoustic Set - A Live Recording (2000)	Freedom (2000)

Freedom is Michael W. Smith's fifteenth album. It was released in 2000 on Reunion Records, and is his first full-length album consisting of only instrumentals. A promotional live EP, The Acoustic Set - A Live Recording, was available as a pre-order bonus.

== Track listing ==
No.	Title	Writer(s)	Length
1.	"Freedom"	Michael W. Smith	3:37
2.	"The Offering"	Smith	1:26
3.	"Carol Ann"	Smith	3:34
4.	"The Giving"	Smith	3:18
5.	"Hibernia"	Smith	4:47
6.	"Letter to Sarah"	Smith	1:45
7.	"Freedom Battle"	Smith	4:33
8.	"Cry of the Heart"	Smith	2:23
9.	"Prayer for Taylor"	Smith	3:01
10.	"The Call"	Smith	5:02
11.	"Thy Word"	Smith, Amy Grant	3:30
12.	"Free Man"	Smith	3:56

The Acoustic Set - A Live Recording (Pre-order bonus EP)
No.	Title	Writer(s)	Length
1.	"Secret Ambition"	Michael W. Smith, Wayne Kirkpatrick, Amy Grant	5:27
2.	"Intro to Love Me Good"		2:25
3.	"Love Me Good"	Smith, Kirkpatrick	4:08
4.	"Intro to Greatest Hits Medley"		1:03
5.	"Greatest Hits Medley: 1. Live the Life; 2. I'll Lead You Home; 3. Place in This World; 4. I WIll Be Here for You; 5. For You; 6. Rocketown"	Smith, Brent Bourgeois; Smith, Kirkpatrick; Smith, Kirkpatrick, Grant; Smith, Diane Warren; Smith, Kirkpatrick, William Owsley Smith, Kirkpatrick	11:06
6.	"Intro to This Is Your Time"		3:44
7.	"This Is Your Time"	Smith, Wes King	5:14

== Personnel ==
- Michael W. Smith – acoustic piano, Hammond B3 organ, keyboards, programming
- Bryan Lenox – keyboards, programming, drums, percussion
- Chris Graffignino – guitars
- Matt Pierson – bass guitar
- Craig Young – bass guitar
- Chris Estes – drums, percussion
- Eric Darken – drums, percussion
- Dan Needham – drums, percussion
- Scott Williamson – drums, percussion
- David Downs (Dublin) – Illyan pipes
- Hunter Lee – Illyan pipes
- Marie Breathnach (Dublin) – Irish fiddle
- John Catchings – cello
- Max Dyer – cello
- David Davidson – violin solo, string arrangements (5)
- Tim Theiss – nail gun (probably used as additional percussion)
- Joel White – nail gun
- Rod Schuler – DJ
- The Irish Film Orchestra – strings
- Catriona Walsh – music supervisor
- The Nashville String Machine – strings
- Carl Gorodetzsky – contractor
- David Hamilton – string arrangements and orchestra conductor
- Larry Paxton – string arrangements (5)
- Kristin Wilkinson – string arrangements (5)
- Ric Domenico – music preparation
- Eberhard Ramm – music preparation

== Production ==
- Michael W. Smith – executive producer, producer
- Bryan Lenox – producer, engineer, mixing, string recording
- Ronnie Brookshire – string recording
- Bill Sommerville-Large – string recording (Dublin)
- David Bryant – assistant engineer
- Rob Burrell – assistant engineer
- Eric Elwell – assistant engineer, technical coordinator, production coordinator
- Terry Flowers – assistant engineer, production assistant
- Ron Jagger – assistant engineer
- Scott Lenox – assistant engineer
- Kieran Lynch – assistant engineer (Dublin)
- Fred Paragano – Pro Tools engineer
- Hank Williams – sequencing, editing and mastering at MasterMix (Nashville, Tennessee)
- Toby Gaines – production assistant
- Ryan Smith – production assistant
- Erin Williams – production assistant
- Chad Dickerson – production coordination
- Tim Parker – art direction, design
- Andrew Southam – photography (New York)
- Jimmy Abegg – photography (Ireland)
- Joe Oppedisano – wardrobe
- Julie Matos – hair, make-up
- James Masenburg – prop stylist

== Chart performance ==
Chart (2014)	Peak position
US Billboard 200	70
US Christian Albums (Billboard)	2
