= Live the Life =

Live The Life

Studio album by Michael W. Smith
- Released: April 28, 1998
- Recorded: 1997
- Studio: Deer Valley Studio, Fun Attic Studio, The Bennett House, Dark Horse Recording Studio and The Playground (Franklin, Tennessee); The Tracking Room and Sixteenth Avenue Sound (Nashville, Tennessee); The Aquarium (London, England)
- Genre: Christian rock, CCM
- Length: 56:52
- Label: Reunion
- Producer: Mark Heimmerman; Michael W. Smith; Stephen Lipson

Michael W. Smith chronology
I'll Lead You Home (1995)	Live The Life (1998)	Christmastime (1998)

Professional ratings
Review scores
Source	Rating
AllMusic	4/5 stars

Live the Life is an album by American musician Michael W. Smith. One notable song on this album was "In My Arms Again," which Michael W. Smith wrote for the film Titanic. "Missing Person" also received airplay on Christian radio.

There were 26 songs written and completed for the album, whose release date was pushed back twice as Smith wasn't fully satisfied with the track list. Along with the 12 songs which eventually made it on the album, the tracks "Greater Than We Understand" and "Evening Show" were released on the B-sides of the CD singles for "Live the Life" and "Love Me Good" respectively. The remaining 12 songs appeared in some form on Smith's 1999 album This Is Your Time.

"Song for Rich" is an instrumental tribute to Rich Mullins who died in a car crash on September 19, 1997.

== Track listing ==
All tracks are written by Michael W. Smith & Wayne Kirkpatrick except where noted.

No.	Title	Writer(s)	Length
1.	"Missing Person"		6:01
2.	"Love Me Good"		4:41
3.	"Live the Life"	Smith, Brent Bourgeois	4:36
4.	"Never Been Unloved"		4:39
5.	"I Believe in You Now"		4:44
6.	"Don't Give Up"	Smith, Bourgeois	4:20
7.	"Let Me Show You the Way"	Smith, Nik Kershaw, Stephen Lipson	4:12
8.	"I Know Your Name"	Smith, Beverly Darnall	4:00
9.	"Matter of Time"	Smith, Bourgeois	3:42
10.	"In My Arms Again"	Smith, Joanna Carlson, Cindy Morgan	6:11
11.	"Song for Rich"	Smith	1:53
12.	"Hello, Goodbye"		5:22
13.	"Live the Life (reprise)" (hidden track)	Smith, Bourgeois	2:30

Japanese bonus tracks
No.	Title	Writer(s)	Length
13.	"Love Me Good (Acoustic Mix)"		3:52
14.	"Live the Life (Acoustic Remix)"		4:40
15.	"Do You Dream of Me?"		4:21
16.	"Once Again"		3:17
17.	"Live the Life (Reprise)" (hidden track)	Smith, Bourgeois	2:30

Bonus track
No.	Title	Length
18.	"Greater Than We Understand"	3:13

Bonus track "Love Me Good" single
No.	Title	Length
3.	"Evening Show"	8:38

== Personnel ==
Musicians

- Michael W. Smith – vocals, keyboards (1, 4–8, 10–12), acoustic piano (2, 3, 5), programming (2, 5, 6, 10), guitars (3, 7, 9), Hammond B3 organ (6)
- Mark Heimmerman – keyboards (1, 3–5, 8, 9, 11, 12), Hammond B3 organ (1)
- Bryan Lenox – programming (2, 6, 10), keyboards (10)
- Phil Madeira – Hammond B3 organ (2)
- Dennis Patton – programming (5, 9)
- Marc Harris – Hammond B3 organ (5)
- Stephen Lipson – programming (7), guitars (7)
- George Cocchini – guitars (1, 3)
- Jerry McPherson – guitars (1–4, 6, 8, 12)
- Will Owsley – guitars (1)
- Micah Wilshire – guitars (3)
- Tom Hemby – guitars (4)
- Nik Kershaw – guitars (7)
- Robbie McIntosh – guitars (7)
- Chris Rodriguez – guitars (8, 9, 12)
- Dann Huff – guitars (9)
- Brent Barcus – guitars (10)
- Brent Milligan – bass (1)
- Jackie Street – bass (1–3, 8, 9, 12)
- Jimmie Lee Sloas – bass (4)
- Dan Needham – drums (1, 3, 4)
- Neil Conti – drums (7)
- Scott Williamson – drums (8, 9, 12)
- Terry McMillan – percussion (1–5, 9)
- Luis Jardim – percussion (7)
- Steve Brewster – percussion (8, 12)
- Ronn Huff – string arrangements and conductor (3)
- Tom Howard – string arrangements and conductor (9), orchestrations and arrangements (10)
- Nashville String Machine – strings (3, 9)
- John Mock – woodwinds (11), woodwind arrangements (11), tin whistle (12)
- Peter Cairney – woodwinds (11)
- Hunter Lee – woodwinds (11)
- William Verdier – woodwinds (11)

Background vocals

- Mark Heimmerman – backing vocals (1, 3, 5, 8, 9)
- Judson Spence – backing vocals (1, 3, 5)
- Micah Wilshire – backing vocals (1, 5, 6)
- Wayne Kirkpatrick – backing vocals (4, 9, 12)
- Michael Black – backing vocals (5)
- Chris Rodriguez – backing vocals (6)
- Lori Wilshire – backing vocals (6)
- Brent Bourgeois – backing vocals (8)

Choir on "Love Me Good"

- Da'dra Crawford, Vicki Hampton, Mark Heimmerman, Nicole C. Mullen, George Pendergrass, Scat Springs, Lori Wilshire and Micah Wilshire

Production and Technical

- Michael Blanton – executive producer
- Mark Heimmerman – producer (1–5, 8, 9, 11, 12)
- Michael W. Smith – producer (1–6, 8–12)
- Stephen Lipson – producer (7)
- Keith Compton – engineer
- Tom Laune – engineer
- Bryan Lenox – engineer, mixing
- Heff Moraes – engineer, mixing
- Todd Robbins – engineer
- Joe Baldridge – mixing
- Rob Burrell – assistant engineer
- Robert "Void" Caprio – assistant engineer
- Dave Dillbeck – assistant engineer
- Patrick Kelly – assistant engineer
- Alan Litten – assistant engineer
- Shawn McLean – assistant engineer
- Tim Putnam – assistant engineer
- Joe Costa – mix assistant
- Adam Hatley – mix assistant
- Dan Rudin – computer editing
- Hank Williams – mastering at MasterMix (Nashville, Tennessee)
- Jimmy Abegg – photography
- Diana Lussenden – art direction, design

== Chart performance ==
Chart (1998)	Peak position
US Billboard 200	23
US Top Christian Albums (Billboard)	1
