= I'll Lead You Home =

Studio album by Michael W. Smith
- Released: August 22, 1995
- Recorded: March–June 1995
- Studios: Caribou Ranch (Nederland, Colorado); Johnny Yuma (Burbank, California); A&M Studios (Hollywood, California); The Sound Kitchen, Deer Valley, The Castle and Studio at Mole End (Franklin, Tennessee); Masterfonics and Sixteenth Avenue Sound (Nashville, Tennessee); Gambit Studio (Gallatin, Tennessee)
- Genre: Contemporary Christian music
- Length: 63:24
- Label: Reunion
- Producer: Patrick Leonard

Michael W. Smith chronology
The First Decade (1983–1993) (1993)	I'll Lead You Home (1995)	Live the Life (1998)

I'll Lead You Home is a 1995 album by Michael W. Smith released by Reunion Records.

== Sales and charts ==
The album entered the Billboard 200 at number 16, making it the highest-debuting Christian album in the history of the chart. It also topped the Top Contemporary Christian chart. Released in August 1995, by December of that year it had sold over 51,500 copies in the Christian bookstore market alone.

== Reception ==
Professional ratings
Review scores
Source	Rating
Allmusic	4.5/5 stars

The album received a four and a half out of five star review from AllMusic, with Stephen Thomas Erlewine commenting on the "gospel songs with glistening, immaculate pop production". James Lloyd, reviewing the album for the Dayton Daily News considered it "his best work to date".

The album won the 1996 Grammy Award in the 'Best Pop-Contemporary Gospel Album' category, giving Smith his second Grammy win.

== Tour ==
Smith toured in support of the album in 1996. Support came from Lori and Micah Wilshire (who he subsequently signed to his Rocketown Records label), Three Crosses, and Jars of Clay. Micah Wilshire had contributed backing vocals to the album.

== Track listing ==
No.	Title	Writer(s)	Length
1.	"Cry for Love"	Smith, Brent Bourgeois	5:10
2.	"Breakdown"	Smith, Wayne Kirkpatrick	5:27
3.	"As It Is in Heaven"	traditional	5:09
4.	"Straight to the Heart"	Smith, Bourgeois	2:48
5.	"Someday"	Smith, Kirkpatrick	3:52
6.	"I'll Be Around"	Smith, Bob Farrell	4:44
7.	"I'll Lead You Home"	Smith, Kirkpatrick	5:23
8.	"The Other Side of Me (Trilogy 1)"	Smith, Kirkpatrick	4:23
9.	"Breathe in Me (Trilogy 2)"	Smith, Kirkpatrick	3:55
10.	"Angels Unaware (Trilogy 3)"	Smith, Kirkpatrick	4:56
11.	"Calling Heaven"	Smith, Kirkpatrick	4:54
12.	"A Little Stronger Everyday"	Smith, Kirkpatrick	4:43
13.	"Crown Him with Many Crowns"	traditional	4:34
14.	"I'm Waiting for You"	Smith, David Mullen, Sam Mullins	3:16

Live The Life Single
No.	Title	Writer(s)	Length
4.	"Cry for Love (Rocketown Club Remix)"	Smith, Bourgeois	4:09

I'll Lead You Home (1995)
No.	Title	Length
8.	"Breakdown (RrrrB Remix)"	5:26

== Personnel ==
Musicians

- Michael W. Smith – vocals, keyboards (1–7, 11–14), programming (4, 11), acoustic piano (8–10, 13)
- Patrick Leonard – keyboards (1, 2), drum programming (2), organ (5, 10, 12, 13), synthesizer programming (14)
- Dennis Patton – programming (2, 4, 7)
- Dann Huff – guitars (1–3, 5–7, 11–13)
- Bruce Gaitsch – acoustic guitar (5)
- Paul Franklin – steel guitar (5, 11, 14)
- Tommy Sims – bass (1, 3, 5–7, 11–13)
- Leland Sklar – bass (10, 14)
- Steve Brewster – drums (1, 3, 5, 6, 12, 13)
- Chris McHugh – drums (2)
- Marc Moreau – drum programming (6)
- Vinnie Colaiuta – drums (7)
- Brian MacLeod – drums (10, 11), additional programming (11)
- Luis Conte – percussion (1, 3, 5–7, 10–13)
- Jeremy Lubbock – orchestra arrangements and conductor (8–10)
- Brent Bourgeois – backing vocals (1, 4, 6)
- Tim Erwin – backing vocals (1)
- Molly Felder – backing vocals (1)
- Chris Rodriguez – backing vocals (1, 12)
- Susan Ashton – harmony vocals (5)
- Lisa Cochran – backing vocals (5, 11, 12)
- Reneé Garcia-Bliss – backing vocals (5)
- Micah Wilshire – backing vocals (5)
- Natalie Jackson – backing vocals (6, 10)
- Louis Johnson – backing vocals (6, 7, 10)
- Richard Page – backing vocals (6, 7, 10)
- Whitney Smith – guest vocal (10)
- Gardner Cole – backing vocals (11)
- Chris Harris – backing vocals (12)
- Anointed (Nee-C Walls, Steve Crawford, Da'dra Crawford and Mary Tiller) – featured vocals (13)

Choir (Tracks 3, 7, 12 & 13)

- Bob Bailey
- Kim Fleming
- Vicki Hampton
- Chris Harris
- Donna McElroy (also vocal coordinator)
- Michael Mellett
- Nicole C. Mullen
- Angelo and Veronica Petrucci
- Chris Rodriguez
- Micah Wilshire

== Production ==
- Michael Blanton – executive producer
- Michael W. Smith – executive producer
- Patrick Leonard – producer
- Don Donahue – A&R
- Keith Compton – engineer
- Craig Hansen – engineer, mixing (1, 4)
- Jerry Jordan – engineer, mixing (11, 14)
- Bryan Lenox – engineer
- Marc Moreau – engineer
- David Thoener – mixing (2, 3, 5–10)
- Bill Deaton – mixing (12, 13)
- Rob Burrell – second engineer
- Dave Dillbeck – second engineer
- David Faulkner – second engineer
- Mike Janas – second engineer
- Patrick Kelly – second engineer
- Scott Lenox – second engineer
- Al Lay – second engineer
- Paula Montondo – second engineer
- Greg Parker – second engineer
- Dennis Patton – second engineer
- Krish Sharma – second engineer
- Darren Smith – second engineer
- J.T. Thomas – second engineer
- Jason Wilder – second engineer
- Jeff Wright – second engineer
- Doug Sax – mastering at The Mastering Lab (Hollywood, California)
- Pat Dorn – production coordinator
- Derek Jones – production coordinator
- Sandra Tomes – production coordinator
- Rob Birkhead – art direction
- Buddy Jackson – design, for Jackson Design
- Karrine Caulkins – design, for Jackson Design
- Diana Lussenden – creative assistant
- Timothy White – cover photography
- Ben Pearson – tray card photo, inside photos
- Russ Harrington – inside photos

== Chart performance ==
Chart (1995)	Peak position
US Billboard 200	16
US Top Christian Albums (Billboard)	1
