= Wonder (Michael W. Smith album) =

Studio album by Michael W. Smith
- Released: September 28, 2010
- Recorded: 2010
- Genre: CCM, pop
- Length: 53:47
- Label: Reunion
- Producer: Michael W. Smith, Bryan Lenox

Michael W. Smith chronology
A New Hallelujah (2008)	Wonder (2010)	Glory (2011)

Wonder is an album by Christian recording artist Michael W. Smith. Released in September 2010, the album peaked at No. 2 on the Top Christian Albums chart, and number 26 on the Billboard 200.

== Track listing ==
No.	Title	Writer(s)	Length
1.	"Save Me from Myself"	Lau Højen, Søren Balsner, Morten Thorhauge	3:39
2.	"Take My Breath Away"	M. Smith, Kyle Lee	4:09
3.	"Run to You"	M. Smith, Matthew West	4:54
4.	"I'll Wait for You"	M. Smith, Tommy Sims	5:14
5.	"Forever Yours"	M. Smith, Michael Olson	3:54
6.	"Welcome Home""	M. Smith, Lee, Michael Farren	4:30
7.	"Wonder Not Far Away"	M. Smith, Stu Garrard, Mia Fieldes	3:47
8.	"Rise"	M. Smith, Lee, Michael Neale	5:07
9.	"You Belong to Me"	M. Smith, Olson, Matt Maher	3:42
10.	"Leave"	Michael W. Smith, Sims	3:29
11.	"One More Time"	M. Smith, Lee, Farren	5:48
12.	"Take Me Over"	M. Smith, Lee, Bryan Lenox	5:39

== Personnel ==
- Michael W. Smith – vocals, acoustic piano, keyboards, Hammond B3 organ, guitars
- Bryan Lenox – keyboards
- Jim Daneker – programming (12)
- Ben Gowell – guitars
- Adam Lester – guitars
- Tommy Sims – guitars
- Jacob Lowery – bass
- Dan Needham – drums
- Byron Chambers – talk box
- Cara Slaybaugh – cello (10)
- Nickie Conley – backing vocals (4)
- Missi Hale – backing vocals (4)
- Darwin Hobbs – backing vocals (4)
- Calvin Nowell – backing vocals (4)
- Chris Rodriguez – backing vocals (4)
- Debi Selby – backing vocals (4)

Strings (Tracks 9, 11 & 12)

- David Davidson – string arrangements (9, 11)
- Jim Daneker – orchestral arrangements (12)
- David Angell, Monisa Angell, John Catchings, David Davidson, Conni Ellisor, Jack Jezioro, Anthony LaMarchina, Pamela Sixfin and Kristin Wilkinson – string players

Gang vocals on "Take My Breath Away"

- Shirley Anderson, Lanny Anderson, JoJo Campbell, Oliver Campbell, Camryn Clark, Catherine Clark, Skylar Cochran, Dallas Dudley, Noah Elwood, Georgia Elwood, Tanner Lenox, Teagan Lenox, Treven Lenox, Tammy Lenox, Titus Lenox, Jessebeth Lowery, Jacob Lowery, Trevor Mathiesen, Judah McKeehan, Leo McKeehan, Marley McKeehan, Moses McKeehan and Bradley Pooler

== Production ==
- Michael W. Smith – producer, executive producer
- Bryan Lenox – producer, recording, mixing
- Greg Ham – executive producer
- Terry Hemmings – executive producer
- Jason McArthur – A&R direction
- Kyle Lee – recording, mixing
- Aaron Chmielewski – recording
- Daryl Dudley II – assistant engineer
- Grant Harrison – assistant engineer
- Tanner Lenox – assistant engineer
- Baeho 'Bobby' Shin – piano and strings recording at Wildwood Recording, Franklin, Tennessee
- Taemin Daniel Choi – piano and strings recording assistant
- Juyoung "Genie" Yim – piano and strings recording assistant
- Elliott Eicheldinger – mix assistant
- Scott Lenox – mix assistant
- Brad Pooler – mix assistant
- Jim Daneker – computer technician
- Chris Athens – mastering
- Gabrielle Crisp – production coordination
- Dallas Dudley – production coordination, assistant engineer
- Trevor Mathiesen – production coordination
- Michelle Box – A&R production
- Beth Lee – art direction
- Tim Parker – art direction, design
- Amy Dickerson – photography
- Melanie Shelley – hair, make-up
- Katy Robbins – wardrobe

Studios

- Recorded at Quad Studios (Nashville, Tennessee) and Emack Studios (Franklin, Tennessee).
- Piano and strings recorded at Wildwood Recording (Franklin, Tennessee)
- Mixed at The Bird House (Franklin, Tennessee).
- Mastered at Sterling Sound (New York City, New York).

== Promotion and release ==
Smith's first single for the album "Save Me From Myself" debuted at No. 17 on the US Hot Christian Songs Chart, and No. 33 on the Canadian Christian Songs Chart. The song is originally written and performed by the Danish rock band Carpark North. A month before the release of the album, Smith released an extended play with four songs from the album: "Save Me From Myself", "Run to You", "You Belong to Me", and "Forever Yours".

== Critical reception ==
Professional ratings
Review scores
Source	Rating
Allmusic	3.5/5 stars
CBN	5/5 stars
Christianity Today	3/5 stars
Jesus Freak Hideout	4.5/5 stars

Dave Wood of Louder Than the Music gave the album 4 out of 5 stars commenting on how Smith "able to produce albums of the highest calabre [sic]." Deborah Evans Price of Billboard gave the album a positive review, saying "Michael has never sounded more compelling or impassioned."

== Charts ==
Chart performance for Wonder
Chart (2014)	Peak position
US Billboard 200	26
US Christian Albums (Billboard)	2
