= A New Hallelujah =

2008 live album by Michael W. Smith

Live album by Michael W. Smith
- Released: October 28, 2008
- Recorded: June 20, 2008
- Venue: Lakewood Church in Houston, Texas
- Genre: Worship
- Length: 68:59
- Label: Reunion
- Producer: Michael W. Smith

Michael W. Smith chronology
It's a Wonderful Christmas (2007)	A New Hallelujah (2008)	Wonder (2010)

Professional ratings
Review scores
Source	Rating
AllMusic	unrated
Jesus Freak Hideout	4.5/5 stars

A New Hallelujah is a live album by Christian recording artist Michael W. Smith. Released in October 2008, this is Smith's third album of worship music, and his fourth live album. It was recorded on June 20, 2008 at Lakewood Church in Houston, Texas. A DVD version of the album was released in March 2009 along with additional bonus features: Behind The Scenes: A New Hallelujah including four new tracks from the live concert.

== Track listing ==
All tracks are written by Michael W. Smith, except noted.

Album release
No.	Title	Writer(s)	Length
1.	"Prepare Intro"		1:00
2.	"Prepare Ye the Way"		5:05
3.	"A New Hallelujah" (featuring the African Children's Choir)	Michael W. Smith, Debbie Smith, Paul Baloche	5:47
4.	"When I Think of You" (featuring the African Children's Choir)		4:28
5.	"Mighty to Save"	Ben Fielding, Reuben Morgan	7:53
6.	"Shout Unto God"	Joel Houston, Marty Sampson	4:08
7.	"Amazing Grace (My Chains Are Gone)"	Chris Tomlin, Louie Giglio, John Newton	5:34
8.	"Deep in Love with You"	Michael W. Smith, Debbie Smith, Christa Black	6:32
9.	"Healing Rain/Let It Rain"	Michael W. Smith, Martin Smith, Matt Bronleewe, Michael Farron	3:20
10.	"Majesty"	Martin Smith, Stu Garrard	4:19
11.	"I Surrender All" (featuring Coalo Zamorano)	Judson W. Van DeVenter	3:51
12.	"Oh Draw Me Lord (Draw Me Near) (Live)"		2:44
13.	"Grace"	Michael W. Smith, Martin Smith	4:21
14.	"Michael W. Smith sharing"		1:44
15.	"Help Is On the Way" (featuring Israel Houghton)	Michael W. Smith, Israel Houghton, Debbie Smith, Christa Black	5:16
16.	"The River Is Rising"		5:41
17.	"Love in His Right Hand"		2:44
18.	"Siwano (Featuring The African Children's Choir) (Live)"		3:24
19.	"A New Hallelujah (Reprise)"
Total length:			68:59

iTunes Store edition
No.	Title	Writer(s)	Length
16.	"A New Hallelujah (Radio Version)" (Digital bonus track)	Michael W. Smith, Debbie Smith, Paul Baloche	4:32
Total length:			73:31

== Personnel ==
- Michael W. Smith – lead vocals, keyboards, acoustic guitar (5, 6), drum section on "Prepare Intro"
- Jim Daneker – keyboards, Hammond B3 organ, programming
- Ben Gowell – electric guitar
- Adam Lester – electric guitar
- Christa Black – acoustic guitar, violin, backing vocals
- Matt Smallbone – bass
- Michael Olson – drums
- Aimee Jones Beard – backing vocals
- Stephen Jackson – backing vocals
- Fiona Mellett – backing vocals
- Michael Mellett – backing vocals, choir director
- The Lakewood Church Choir – adult choir
- The African Children's Choir – children's choir (3, 4); directed by Alice Nabwami
- Coal Zamorano – Spanish solo (11)
- Israel Houghton – guest lead vocals (14)
- Matt Payne – drum section on "Prepare Intro"
- Spence Smith – drum section on "Prepare Intro"

Production

- Michael W. Smith – producer, arrangements
- Chaz Corzine – associate producer
- Michael Blanton – executive producer
- Bob Ezrin – executive producer
- Terry Hemmings – executive producer
- Rob Burrell – engineer, mixing
- Hank Williams – mastering at MasterMix, Nashville, Tennessee
- Traci Sterling Bishir – production coordination
- Michelle Box – A&R production
- Jason McArthur – A&R coordination
- Louis Deluca – photography
- Tim Parker – design
- Ron Roark – design
- Trish Townsend – stylist

== Reception ==
The album won two 2009 Dove Awards at the 40th GMA Dove Awards, for Best Inspirational Recorded Song and Best Praise & Worship Album. and was a new hallelujah unedited version.

== Charts ==
=== Weekly charts ===
Chart performance for A New Hallelujah
Chart (2008-2009)	Peak position
Hungarian Albums (MAHASZ)	2
US Billboard 200	19
US Top Christian Albums (Billboard)	1

=== Year-end charts ===
Year-end chart performance for A New Hallelujah
Chart (2008)	Position
US Christian Albums (Billboard)	46
Chart (2009)	Position
US Billboard 200	139
US Christian Albums (Billboard)	3
Chart (2010)	Position
US Christian Albums (Billboard)	43

== Certifications ==
Region	Certification	Certified units/sales
United States	—	23,000
