= This Is Your Time (Michael W. Smith album) =

Studio album by Michael W. Smith
- Released: November 23, 1999
- Recorded: 1997, 1999
- Studios: Deer Valley Studio and Sound Kitchen (Franklin, Tennessee); Ocean Way Recording (Nashville, Tennessee)
- Genres: Contemporary Christian music, pop
- Length: 50:25
- Label: Reunion
- Producers: Michael W. Smith; Bryan Lenox

Michael W. Smith chronology
Christmastime (1998)	This Is Your Time (1999)	Freedom (2000)

Professional ratings
Review scores
Source	Rating
AllMusic	4/5 stars
Jesus Freak Hideout	4/5 stars

This Is Your Time is Michael W. Smith's fourteenth studio album, released on November 23, 1999. All the songs from this album, except "This Is Your Time" and "This Is Your Time (Reprise)", were originally recorded for his previous studio album Live the Life, but did not make the final cut for the album.

== Background ==
The title track was inspired by the initial news report that Columbine shooting victim Cassie Bernall was killed for answering "yes" to the question "Do you believe in God?" Smith co-wrote the song with Wes King, having enlisted his help knowing that he wanted to write about Columbine but did not want to exploit a tragedy. The music video features a short video clip of Bernall talking about her religious beliefs and how she wanted to spread the word of God at the beginning. Investigators later concluded that Valeen Schnurr, who survived the shooting, was the one who answered yes.

== Track listing ==
No.	Title	Writer(s)	Length
1.	"Rince De" (Instrumental)	Smith	1:30
2.	"Hey You It's Me"	Smith, Nik Kershaw	4:03
3.	"Worth It All"	Smith, Tim Putnam, Deborah D. Smith	4:03
4.	"I Will Be Your Friend"	Smith, Cindy Morgan	3:19
5.	"This Is Your Time"	Smith, Wes King	4:29
6.	"I Will Carry You"	Smith, Eric Laughlin	5:04
7.	"She Walks With Me"	Smith, Beth Nielsen Chapman	3:42
8.	"Reach Out to Me"	Smith, Dan Haseltine	3:59
9.	"I Still Have the Dream"	Smith, Raymond Boyd, Kevin Jonas	4:18
10.	"I'm Gone"	Smith, Ginny Owens	4:31
11.	"Anna"	Smith, Wayne Kirkpatrick	4:16
12.	"Everybody Free"	Smith, Chris Rice	4:43
13.	"This Is Your Time" (Reprise)	Smith	2:25

Wal-Mart bonus track
No.	Title	Length
14.	"From Here On"	3:07

== Personnel ==
- Michael W. Smith – vocals, keyboards, programming, acoustic piano, Hammond B3 organ, acoustic guitar
- Bryan Lenox – keyboards, programming, drums, percussion
- Mark Baldwin – guitars, acoustic guitar
- Chris Graffagnino – guitars, acoustic guitar
- Wes King – acoustic guitar
- Chris Rodriguez – guitars, acoustic guitar, backing vocals (9)
- Matt Pierson – bass guitar
- Craig Young – bass guitar
- Raymond Boyd – drums, percussion
- Eric Darken – drums, percussion
- Scott Williamson – drums, percussion
- Hunter Lee – Illyan pipes
- Greg Cutcliffe – bagpipes
- Jay Dawson – bagpipes
- Mike Orrick – bagpipes
- Ronn Huff – string arrangements and conductor
- Carl Gorodetzsky – contractor
- Nashville String Machine – strings
- David Davidson – string arrangements and contractor (5, 8, 10)
- The Love Sponge Strings – additional strings (5, 8, 10)
- John Elefante – backing vocals (2)
- Nik Kershaw – backing vocals (2)
- Joanna Carlson – backing vocals (4)
- Chris Eaton – backing vocals (4, 11)
- Anna Smith – backing vocals (5)
- Whitney Smith – backing vocals (5)
- Lisa Bevill – backing vocals (7, 9)
- Bonnie Keen – backing vocals (9)
- Mark Pogue – backing vocals (9)

The "Franklin Boys Glee Club" on "Worth It All"

- Eric Elwell, Terry Flowers, Bryan Lenox, Fred Paragano and Michael W. Smith

The "Choir" (5, 6 & 8)

- Angela Cruz, Natalie Grant, Darwin Hobbs, Gale Mayes-West, Tiffany Palmer, Leanne Palmore, Dwayne Starling and Terry White

Production

- Michael Blanton – executive producer
- Michael W. Smith – executive producer, producer
- Bryan Lenox – producer, engineer, mixing, string recording
- Eric Elwell – additional engineer, technical coordinator, production coordinator
- Terry Flowers – additional engineer, assistant engineer, production assistant
- Patrick Kelly – additional engineer
- Matt Weeks – additional engineer, string recording assistant
- Rob Burrell – assistant engineer
- Ron Jagger – assistant engineer
- Scott Lenox – assistant engineer
- Chad Brown – string recording assistant
- Melissa Mattey – string recording assistant
- Fred Paragano – Pro Tools engineer
- Hank Williams – sequencing, editing and mastering at MasterMix (Nashville, Tennessee)
- Mary Adcock – production assistant
- Alicia Claxton – production assistant
- Morgan Daneker – production assistant
- Surupa Mafia – production assistant
- Whitney Smith – production assistant
- Ben Pearson – photography
- Diana Lussenden – layout

== Chart performance ==
Chart (1999)	Peak position
US Billboard 200	21
US Top Christian Albums (Billboard)	1
