= Michael W. Smith =

American musician (born 1957)

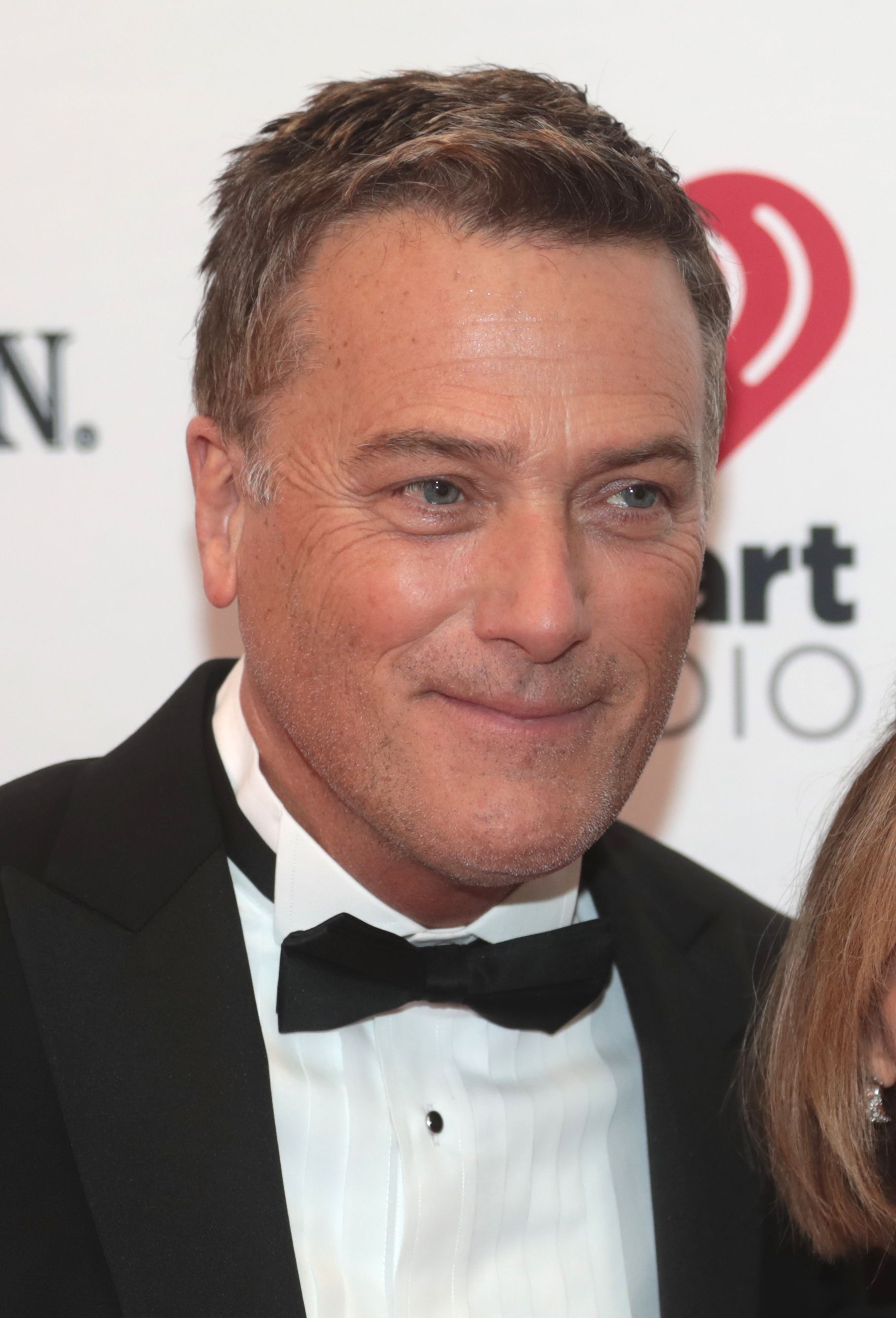
- Smith in 2019
- Born: Michael Whitaker Smith; October 7, 1957 (age 69); Kenova, West Virginia, U.S.
- Occupations: Musician; actor; worship leader; pastor (formerly)
- Spouse: Deborah Kay Davis (m. 1981)
- Children: 5
- Musical career
- Origin: Nashville, Tennessee, U.S.
- Genres: CCM; Christian rock; pop; pop rock
- Instruments: Vocals; keyboards; piano; guitar
- Years active: 1983–present
- Labels: Reunion; Provident; Capitol; Rocketown
- Website: michaelwsmith.com

Michael Whitaker Smith (born October 7, 1957) is an American musician who has charted in both contemporary Christian and mainstream charts. His biggest success in mainstream music was in 1991 when "Place in This World" hit No. 6 on the Billboard Hot 100. Over the course of his career, he has sold more than 18 million albums.

Smith is a three-time Grammy Award winner, an American Music Award recipient, and has earned 45 Dove Awards. In 1999, ASCAP awarded him with the "Golden Note" Award for lifetime achievement in songwriting, and in 2014 they honored him as the "cornerstone of Christian music" for his significant influence on the genre. He also has recorded 31 No. 1 hit songs, 14 gold albums, and five platinum albums. He has also starred in two films and published 14 books including This Is Your Time, which he worked with Christian author Gary Thomas to write.

== Early life ==
Michael Whitaker Smith was born to Paul W. (1932–2015) and Barbara (née Spradlin; 1934–2021) Smith in Kenova, West Virginia. He has one sister named Kimberly. His father was an oil refinery worker at the Ashland Oil Refinery, in nearby Catlettsburg, Kentucky. His mother was a caterer. He inherited his love of baseball from his father, who had played in the minor leagues. As a child, he developed a love of music through his church, First Baptist Church of Kenova, where he learned piano and sang in the New Generation church choir. At the age of 10, he had "an intense spiritual experience" that led to his becoming a devout Christian. "I wore this big cross around my neck," he would recall, "It was very real to me." He became involved in Bible study and found a group of older friends who shared his faith.

After his older Christian friends moved away to college, Smith began to struggle with feelings of loneliness and alienation. After graduating from high school, he gravitated toward alcohol and drugs. He attended Marshall University while developing his songwriting skills but dropped out after one semester. He also played with various local bands around Huntington, West Virginia. During that time, his friend Shane Keister, who worked as a session musician in Nashville, encouraged him to move to Nashville, the Country Music capital, and pursue a career in music.

In 1978, Smith moved to Nashville, taking a job as a landscaper to support himself. He played with several local bands in the Nashville club scene. He also developed a problem with substance abuse.

I really started losing touch when I moved to Nashville, around April of '78. I was smokin' marijuana, drinking, doing some other drugs; just being crazy, you know. My mom and dad knew what I was doing. But they never hassled me; they just prayed for me. And I felt convicted by God. Every time I'd wake up I knew: This isn't me. But I couldn't change myself.

After a breakdown in November 1979, Smith decided to recommit to Christianity. The next day he auditioned for a new contemporary Christian music (CCM) group, Higher Ground, as a keyboardist and got the job. His lead vocals were heard on much of CCM radio with the single, "I Am". It was on his first tour with Higher Ground, playing mostly in churches, that Smith was finally able to put the drugs and alcohol behind him.

== Music career ==
=== Beginning (1981–1989) ===
In 1981, while he was playing keyboards for Higher Ground, Smith was signed as a writer to Meadowgreen Music, where he wrote numerous gospel hits penned for artists such as Sandi Patty, Kathy Troccoli, Bill Gaither and Amy Grant, to the effect that some of these popular worship songs can now be found in church hymnals. The following year, Smith began touring as a keyboardist for Grant on her Age to Age tour.

He became Grant's opening act and recorded his first Grammy-nominated solo album The Michael W. Smith Project (which he also produced himself) in 1983 on the Reunion Records label. This album contained the first recording of his hit "Friends", which he co-wrote with his wife Deborah. By the time Smith's second album Michael W. Smith 2 was released in 1984, he was headlining his own tours. In 1986, Smith released The Big Picture.

After the release of his 1988 effort, i 2 (EYE), Smith once again collaborated with Grant for her "Lead Me On" world tour. The following year, Smith recorded his first Christmas album, simply titled Christmas (1989).

=== Mainstream venture and inspirational pop albums (1990–1999) ===
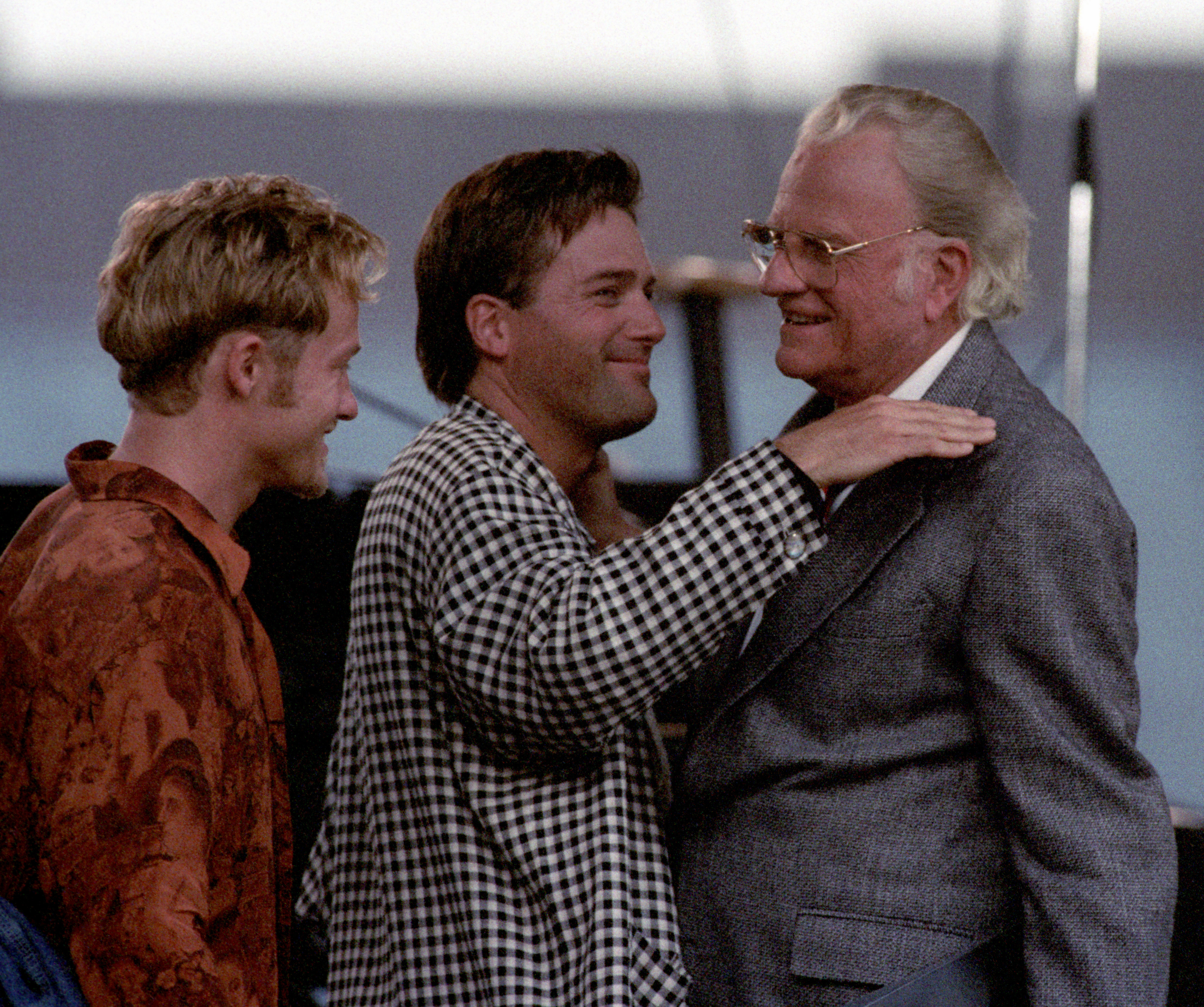
Michael W. Smith and TobyMac with evangelist Billy Graham in 1994

In 1990, Smith released Go West Young Man, his first mainstream effort, which included the mainstream crossover hit single "Place in This World". The song peaked at No. 6 on the Billboard Hot 100. In 1992, he released Change Your World, which included the No. 1 adult contemporary hit "I Will Be Here for You". In 1993 Smith released his first box set, The Wonder Years and his first greatest hits album, The First Decade (1983–1993). The latter also includes two new songs, "Do You Dream of Me?" and "Kentucky Rose".

In 1994, Smith appeared as a guest pianist on the album Swing, Swang, Swung by Christian rock band Guardian.

In 1995, Smith released his eighth album I'll Lead You Home, which combines the pop style of his previous albums with a touch of religious feel. Live the Life (1998) and This Is Your Time (1999) follow the same style. In 1998, Smith also released his second Christmas album, Christmastime.

Smith collaborated with Jim Brickman on "Love of My Life", a romantic love song for Brickman's album Destiny in 1999. The song went to chart at No. 9 on the Hot Adult Contemporary Tracks. Also in 1999, he became the first Christian artist to receive the ASCAP "Golden Note" Award for lifetime achievement in songwriting.

=== Instrumental and live worship albums (2000–2003) ===
Nearly all of Smith's albums include at least one instrumental track, and in 2000 Smith recorded his first all instrumental album, Freedom. The following year, Smith released his first all-worship music album, Worship, on September 11. This album was followed by a sequel, Worship Again in 2002. Both albums were recorded live in concert. Worship Again also includes a song that Smith wrote called "There She Stands", inspired by the September 11, 2001 attacks. He performed this song live for the 2004 Republican National Convention, saying that President George W. Bush, who he said is a fan and a family friend, had asked him to write a song about the attacks.

In 2002, Smith released a live concert DVD titled Worship, filmed live in Edmonton, Alberta at YC Alberta. The concert includes songs from both Worship (2001) and Worship Again (2002). It immediately topped the Billboard video charts and went gold in both the U.S. and Canada.

Smith won the Male Vocalist of the Year award at the GMA Music Awards in 2003. The same year he also released his second greatest hits album, The Second Decade (1993–2003), which includes a new single called "Signs".

=== Contemporary Christian albums (2004–2010) ===
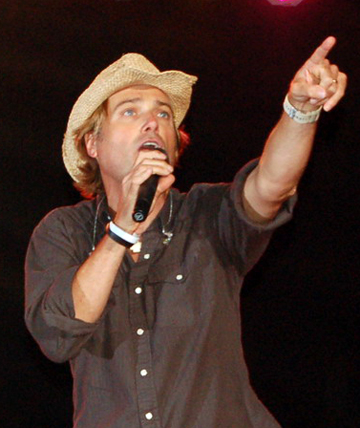
Michael W. Smith during a concert in Bloomsburg, Pennsylvania in 2005

Smith's album, Healing Rain, was released in 2004 and debuted at No. 11 on the Billboard 200 Chart. The title track rose to No. 1 on the Radio & Records Charts and a music video for the song was released. The album combines the pop style of his previous recordings with the religious feel of his two live worship albums. It was also nominated for a Grammy Award for Best Pop/Contemporary Gospel Album. In 2006 he released Stand, which is similar to Healing Rain (2004) in style and genre but with more Christian-themed songs. Also in 2006, Smith did the score and soundtrack to the film The Second Chance, which he also starred in. He also released a single from the soundtrack album, "All in the Serve".

In October 2007, he released his third Christmas album, It's a Wonderful Christmas. On June 20, 2008, Smith recorded his third live Worship album at the Lakewood Church in Houston, Texas, titled A New Hallelujah. It was released in October 2008. That same month he began a tour with Steven Curtis Chapman. In September 2010, he released Wonder, which follows the CCM style of Healing Rain (2004) and Stand (2006).

=== Orchestral instrumental, hymns, and studio worship albums (2011–2016) ===
Smith's second instrumental album, Glory, was released on November 22, 2011. Unlike his first instrumental album, Freedom (2000), this album features a 65-piece orchestra recorded at AIR Studios Lyndhurst Hall in London and Wildwood Recording Studio in Nashville. The following year he released his third compilation album, Decades of Worship (2012).

Smith's concert in Draper, Utah, on July 24, 2012 was almost canceled due to a complaint filed by a Utah resident on July 16, 2012. He claimed that a show "conflated with prayer and worship" should remain in church or private property, not in the "public's backyard". The following day the city council decided to cancel the concert, but a day later they decided to host the show as planned after all, following a criticism from a Utah evangelical group that equated cancelling the concert to an assault on religious liberty. The Mayor of Draper and several city council members were present at the event and were recognized for their support.

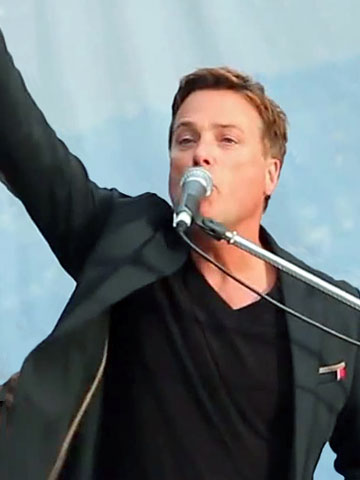
Michael W. Smith performing in June 2014

In 2014, Smith released three albums, Hymns, Sovereign, and The Spirit of Christmas. Hymns is Smith's first effort at doing his own rendition of traditional hymns, and it was released exclusively at Cracker Barrel Old Country Store on March 24, 2014. The album sold 12,000 copies in its first week of release and debuted at No. 24 on the US Billboard 200. It was also the best-selling Christian music album for the week of April 19, 2014, and won a 2014 Dove Award for "Inspirational Album of the Year". Sovereign, released on May 13, 2014, is his first studio worship album and his first album released through Capitol Records, after leaving his long-time label Reunion Records in 2013. The album sold almost 16,000 copies in its first week, and debuted at No. 10 on the Billboard 200, making it the highest-charting album in his career as of 2014. The Spirit of Christmas, officially released as Michael W. Smith & Friends: The Spirit of Christmas, is Smith's first duet album. Released on September 30, 2014, it features duets with Carrie Underwood, Lady Antebellum, Little Big Town, Jennifer Nettles, Martina McBride, Vince Gill, Bono, Amy Grant, and Michael McDonald. The album marks Smith's third new album in 2014 to enter the Billboard 200, peaking at No. 16 as of December 2014. It also won a 2015 Dove Award for "Christmas Album of the Year".

Smith, along with Amy Grant, was honored as the "cornerstone of Christian music" by ASCAP in 2014 for his significant influence on the genre. In 2015, Smith and his son Tyler wrote the score and soundtrack for the film 90 Minutes in Heaven, in which he also has a small acting role.

In November 2015, Smith and Amy Grant started their annual Christmas tour again after a roughly 15-year break.

Smith's second hymns album, called Hymns II – Shine on Us, was released on January 29, 2016. Like his first hymns album released in 2014, the album was sold exclusively at Cracker Barrel Old Country Store.

On June 21, 2016, Smith released a new single titled "He Will Never End" which was originally released in March 2016 as a bonus track on the Target exclusive edition of The Passion: New Orleans soundtrack CD (2016). On June 27, 2016, he released the music video for the single which was filmed entirely in Israel in April 2016.

Later in 2016, Smith released a Christmas musical project in a collaboration with Wes King, Bradley Knight, and Luke Gambill called Almost There – A Christmas Musical. The musical is named after a song Smith wrote a few years earlier for his Christmas album The Spirit of Christmas (2014).

=== A Million Lights and Surrounded (2017–present) ===
On August 11, 2017, Smith released a new single, "A Million Lights", which marks a departure from his previous sound. It is the lead single and title track from his pop album released on February 16, 2018. A week after, on February 23, 2018, Smith released another album called Surrounded which is his first live worship album in ten years. The two albums became his 30th and 31st top 10 entries in Billboard's Top Christian Albums chart, the most among solo artists in the span of his career.

In May 2018, Smith launched a new children's book series, Nurturing Steps, which he created with VeggieTales co-creator Mike Nawrocki. The first book, Nighty Night and Good Night, was released May 8. He also released his first children's album, Lullaby, to accompany the book.

On August 30, 2018, Smith hosted a free event at Nashville's Bridgestone Arena called "Surrounded: A Night to Pray, Worship and Be Awakened". The event was broadcast in October 2018 on TBN in 175 countries worldwide.

On February 22, 2019, Smith released Awaken: The Surrounded Experience, a live worship album.

Smith released a live album of worship music, Worship Forever, to commemorate the 20th anniversary of 9/11, which is also the date in which his original album Worship was released. It was also accompanied by a live concert on TBN.

In March 2024, Smith released his worship EP Worthy is the Lamb which was recorded at Belmont University.

In April 2025, Smith released the single "Arms Around the Sun"

== Acting career ==
In 1994, Smith made his acting debut as Billy Holden in Secret Adventures: "Shrug". In 2006, Smith was the lead actor in The Second Chance, a film directed by Steve Taylor. He also did some of the score and soundtrack for this film.

In 2015, Smith starred as Cliff McArdle in the film adaptation of the best-selling book 90 Minutes in Heaven by Don Piper. In addition, he collaborated with his son on the score and soundtrack for this film.

Smith also starred as James the disciple in The Passion, a live musical film that was aired on FOX on March 20, 2016.

== Other ventures ==
In 1994, Smith opened a teen club, named Rocketown, in Nashville, Tennessee (6th Avenue). Later in early 2003, the club was moved to a new location—a renovated warehouse in downtown Nashville. The venue offers a large dance floor, extensive indoor skate park, and a café hosting live acoustic music.

In 1996, Smith opened his own record label, Rocketown Records. The label was named after a song on his third album The Big Picture. The first artist signed was Chris Rice, who had written "Go Light Your World", a No. 1 hit song by Kathy Troccoli, in 1995. Smith did not record under the label himself until 2018.

Smith is actively involved in volunteer service and is vice chair of the President's Council on Service and Civic Participation, which is chaired by Jean Case of the Case Foundation. He is also an avid spokesperson for sponsoring children through Compassion International.

Smith was active in Billy Graham Crusades as well as Samaritan's Purse. Smith sang "Just As I Am" in a tribute to Graham at the 44th GMA Dove Awards. He also sang it at the memorial service honoring Graham at the United States Capitol rotunda on February 28, 2018.

== Personal life ==
Smith is married to Deborah "Debbie" Kay Davis and has five children, including filmmaker Ryan Whitaker Smith.

He lives in the Nashville suburbs. Smith attended Belmont Church in Nashville, Tennessee, and is mentored by its long-time pastor, Don Finto. Smith is also the founding pastor of New River Fellowship Church in Franklin, Tennessee, where he was the lead pastor from 2006 to 2008. His current primary association is with Gateway Church (specifically the Franklin/Nashville area campuses).

Smith was a friend of former president George H. W. Bush and is a friend of his son, former president George W. Bush. Smith was invited to play at the 2004 Republican National Convention singing "There She Stands", as well as the state funeral of George H. W. Bush at the National Cathedral in Washington, DC, on December 5, 2018, singing "Friends".

Smith is also friends with U2 singer Bono, who was a guest on Smith’s Spirit of Christmas album; they also collaborated on the One Campaign.

Alderson-Broaddus College awarded Smith the degree Doctorate of Music honoris causa in 1992.

Smith was also named one of People magazine's "Most Beautiful People" in 1992.

In 2018, he performed at Billy Graham's memorial and funeral.

In June 2019, Smith signed a declaration by Franklin Graham calling for a special day of prayer for President Donald Trump, that God would protect, strengthen, embolden, and direct him.

In 2023, Smith asked Ohioans to vote against the Issue 1 ballot measure to enshrine contraception and abortion in the state constitution, calling it a "spiritual battle".

Smith has been a worship leader at TheCall events, large prophetic prayer rallies founded by Lou Engle and Ché Ahn.

== Works ==
=== Discography ===
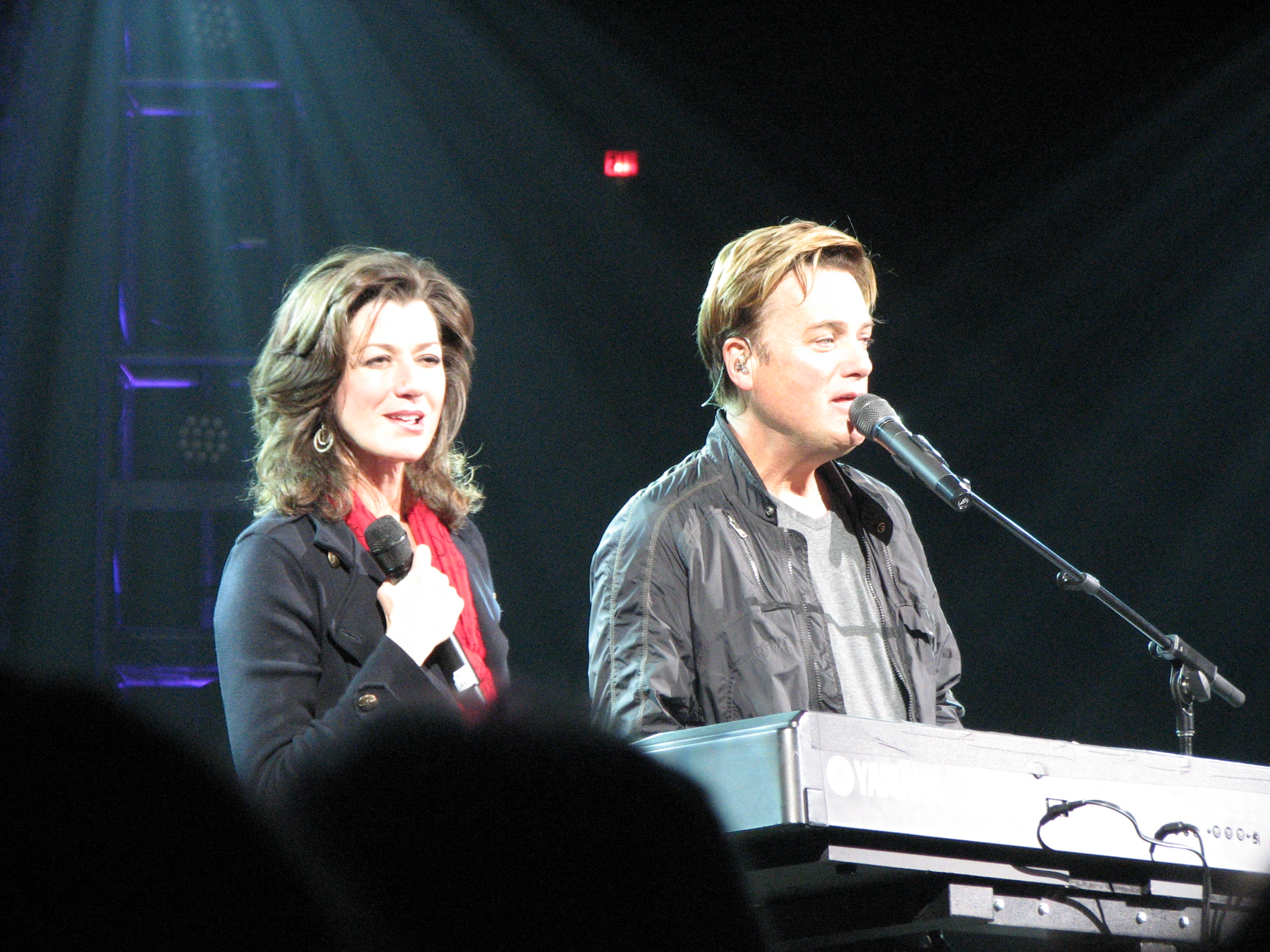
Amy Grant (left) and Michael W. Smith (right) have gone on several concert tours together

- Michael W. Smith Project (1983)
- Michael W. Smith 2 (1984)
- The Big Picture (1986)
- The Live Set (1987)
- i 2 (EYE) (1988)
- Christmas (1989)
- Go West Young Man (1990)
- Change Your World (1992)
- The First Decade (1983–1993) (1993)
- I'll Lead You Home (1995)
- Live the Life (1998)
- Christmastime (1998)
- This Is Your Time (1999)
- Freedom (2000)
- Worship (2001)
- Worship Again (2002)
- The Second Decade (1993–2003) (2003)
- Healing Rain (2004)
- Stand (2006)
- It's a Wonderful Christmas (2007)
- A New Hallelujah (2008)
- Wonder (2010)
- Glory (2011)
- Decades of Worship (2012)
- Hymns (2014)
- Sovereign (2014)
- The Spirit of Christmas (2014)
- Hymns II – Shine on Us (2016)
- A Million Lights (2018)
- Surrounded (2018)
- Lullaby (2018)
- Awaken: The Surrounded Experience (2019)
- Still, Volume 1 (2020)
- Worship Forever (2021)
- Christmas at Home (2022)
- Every Christmas (2023)
- Worthy Is the Lamb (Live) (2024)

=== Publications ===
- Old Enough to Know. Nashville: Thomas Nelson, 1987. ISBN 978-0849931628
- It's Time to Be Bold. Nashville: Word Publishing, 1997. ISBN 978-1568655635
- Friends are Friends Forever. Nashville: Thomas Nelson, 1997. ISBN 978-0785297468
- Your Place in This World. Nashville: Thomas Nelson, 1998. ISBN 978-0785270201
- This Is Your Time: Make Every Moment Count. Nashville: Thomas Nelson, 1999. ISBN 978-0785270355
- I Will Be Your Friend. Nashville: Thomas Nelson, 2001. ISBN 978-0785270362
- Worship. Nashville: Thomas Nelson, 2001. ISBN 978-0849995934
- The Price of Freedom. Nashville: Thomas Nelson, 2002. ISBN 978-0849956096
- Signs. Nashville: Thomas Nelson, 2004. ISBN 978-1400302956
- Healing Rain. Nashville: Thomas-Nelson. 2004. ISBN 978-1591452737
- A Simple Blessing. Grand Rapids: Zondervan, 2011. ISBN 978-0310327561
- The Power of an Ordinary Prayer: Worthy Publishing, 2013. ISBN 978-1617951923
- Nighty Night and Good Night: Zonderkids, 2018. ISBN 978-0310767015
- The Way of the Father. Lessons from My Dad, Truths about God: K-LOVE, 2021. ISBN 978-1954201026

=== Audio books ===
- The Gospels Come to Life. Irving, Texas: Gospels Come to Life, 2003.

=== Filmography ===
- Secret Adventures: Shrug (1994) as Billy Holden
- The Second Chance (2006) as Ethan Jenkins
- 90 Minutes in Heaven (2015) as Cliff McArdle

== Awards ==
Grammy Awards

- 1984 Best Gospel Performance, Male for Michael W. Smith 2
- 1995 Best Pop/Contemporary Gospel Album for I'll Lead You Home
- 2002 Best Pop/Contemporary Gospel Album for Worship Again

Grammy nominations

- 1983 Best Gospel Performance, Male for Michael W. Smith Project
- 1986 Best Gospel Performance, Male for The Big Picture
- 1988 Best Gospel Performance, Male for I 2(Eye)
- 1989 Best Gospel Vocal Performance, Male for "Holy, Holy, Holy"
- 1990 Best Pop Gospel Album for Go West Young Man
- 1998 Best Pop/Contemporary Gospel Album for Live the Life
- 2000 Best Pop/Contemporary Gospel Album for This Is Your Time
- 2002 Best Pop/Contemporary Gospel Album for Worship
- 2006 Best Christian Pop Album for Healing Rain
- 2008 Best Pop/Contemporary Gospel Album for Stand
- 2019 Best Contemporary Christian Music Album for Surrounded

Dove Awards

- 1985 Songwriter of the Year
- 1987 Pop/Contemporary Album of the Year for The Big Picture (producer, artist)
- 1988 Long Form Music Video of the Year for "The Big Picture Tour Video" (artist)
- 1990 Short Form Music Video of the Year for "I Miss the Way" (artist)
- 1991 Pop/Contemporary Album of the Year for Go West Young Man (producer, artist)
- 1992 Choral Collection of the Year for The Michael W. Smith Collection (artist)
- 1992 Musical Album of the Year for Change Your World (artist)
- 1992 Song of the Year for "Place in this World" (artist)
- 1993 Praise and Worship Album of the Year for Songs from the Loft (artist)
- 1993 Recorded Music Packaging of the Year for The Wonder Years (artist)
- 1994 Musical Album of the Year for Living on the Edge (artist)
- 1996 Songwriter of the Year
- 1996 Special Event Album of the Year for My Utmost For His Highest (artist)
- 1997 Special Event Album of the Year for Tribute: The Songs of Andrae Crouch (artist)
- 1998 Children's Music Album of the Year for Sing Me to Sleep Daddy (artist)
- 1998 Special Event Album of the Year for God With Us: A Celebration of Christmas Carols and Classics (artist)
- 1998 Enhanced CD of the Year for Live the Life – Maxi Single (artist)
- 1999 Artist of the Year
- 1999 Pop/Contemporary Album of the Year for Live the Life (producer, artist)
- 1999 Producer of the Year
- 1999 Special Event Album of the Year for Exodus (artist)
- 2000 Short Form Music Video of the Year for "This is Your Time" (artist)
- 2000 Song of the Year for "This Is Your Time" (artist)
- 2000 Songwriter of the Year
- 2001 Pop/Contemporary Album of the Year for This is Your Time (producer, artist)
- 2001 Youth/Children's Musical Album of the Year for Friends 4 Ever (artist)
- 2002 Album of the Year for Worship (producer, artist)
- 2002 Artist of the Year
- 2002 Inspirational Recorded Song of the Year for "Above All" (artist)
- 2002 Instrumental Album of the Year for Freedom (producer, artist)
- 2003 Album of the Year for Worship Again (producer, artist)
- 2003 Artist of the Year
- 2003 Long Form Music Video of the Year for Worship DVD/Video (producer, artist)
- 2003 Male Vocalist of the Year
- 2008 Christmas Album of the Year for It's a Wonderful Christmas
- 2009 Inspirational Recorded Song of the Year for "A New Hallelujah"
- 2009 Praise & Worship Album of the Year for A New Hallelujah
- 2012 Best Instrumental Album of the Year for Glory
- 2014 Inspirational Album of the Year for Hymns
- 2015 Christmas Album of the Year for The Spirit of Christmas

American Music Awards

- 1992 Favorite New Adult Contemporary Artist

Gospel Music Hall of Fame

- 2008 Inductee

We Love Awards

- 2025 Music Video of the Year for "Arms Around the Sun"
