= Worship (Michael W. Smith album) =

Album by Michael W. Smith

Live album by Michael W. Smith
- Released: September 11, 2001
- Recorded: June 1, 2001
- Venues: Carpenter's Home Church, Lakeland, Florida, US
- Genre: Contemporary worship music
- Length: 67:41
- Label: Reunion
- Producers: Michael W. Smith, Tom Laune

Michael W. Smith chronology
Freedom (2000)	Worship (2001)	Worship Again (2002)

Professional ratings
Review scores
Source	Rating
AllMusic	5/5 stars
Jesus Freak Hideout	3.5/5 stars

Worship is Michael W. Smith's sixteenth album. The album, Smith's first album of contemporary worship music, was recorded live and was released on Reunion Records in 2001. The album was reissued as a DualDisc in 2005.

== Background ==
Smith sang "Above All" at President George W. Bush's 2001 inaugural prayer service. In 2002, he released a follow-up album Worship Again and a DVD comprising selections from both albums.

== Track listing ==
No.	Title	Writer(s)	Length
1.	"Forever"	Chris Tomlin	5:50
2.	"The Heart of Worship"	Matt Redman	6:15
3.	"Draw Me Close"	Kelly Carpenter	4:14
4.	"Turn Your Eyes Upon Jesus"	Helen H. Lemmel	3:12
5.	"Open the Eyes of My Heart"	Paul Baloche	5:22
6.	"Above All"	Lenny LeBlanc, Baloche	4:23
7.	"Breathe"	Marie Barnett	6:57
8.	"Let It Rain"	Michael Farren	5:40
9.	"Agnus Dei"	Michael W. Smith	6:40
10.	"Awesome God"	Rich Mullins	4:40
11.	"More Love, More Power"	Jude del Hierro	5:10
12.	"Purified"	Deborah D. Smith, Michael W. Smith	4:32
13.	"Above All (studio version)"	LeBlanc, Baloche	4:36
Total length:			67:41

DualDisc DVD side
No.	Title	Length
1.	"Entire album in PCM Stereo and 5.1 Digital Surround Sound"
2.	"Concert Footage featuring "Above All" and "Awesome God""
3.	"The Worship Movement: Interview with best selling artists Michael W. Smith and Don Moen"
4.	"Let It Rain Around the World Interview"
5.	"The Second Chance Movie Trailer"	1:57

== Personnel ==
- Michael W. Smith – vocals, acoustic piano, programming on "Purified"
- David Hamilton – keyboards, music director; orchestra arrangement, writer and conductor on "Purified"
- Jim Daneker – keyboards, MIDI programming, programming on "Purified"
- Kent Hooper – programming on "Above All" (studio version)
- Wes King – acoustic guitars
- Glenn Pearce – electric guitars
- Jerry McPherson – additional guitars on "Above All" (studio version)
- Brent Milligan – bass
- Raymond Boyd – drums
- Ken Lewis – additional percussion on "Purified"
- David Davidson – violin, viola
- The Nashville String Machine – orchestra on "Purified"
- Carl Gorodetzky – contractor
- Ric Dominico – music preparation
- Anna Smith – spoken word
- Emily Smith – spoken word
- Darren Whitehead – spoken word

Additional vocals on "Purified" and "Above All" (studio version)

- Leigh Cappillino
- Christine Denté
- Darwin Hobbs
- Kristie Mays
- Fiona Mellett
- Leanne Palmore
- Chance Scoggins
- Terry White

Choir

- Chris Rice
- Amy Grant
- Mark Schultz
- Geron Davis
- Greg Long
- Phillips, Craig & Dean
- Becky Davis
- Erin O'Donnell
- Shaun Groves
- Out of Eden
- Allison Redman
- Mike Carpino
- Raphael Giglio
- Ginny Owens
- Kelly Minter
- Cindy Morgan
- Darwin Hobbs
- Wes King
- Jason Perry (of Plus One)
- Nathan Walters (of Plus One)

== Production ==
- Michael W. Smith – executive producer, producer
- Tom Laune – producer, engineer, mixing at Bridgeway Studio (Nashville, Tennessee)
- Lynn Fuston – string session recording ("Purified")
- Brent King – live recording engineer
- Rob Burrell – live recording engineer, Pro Tools, editing
- Joel Singer – remote recording system at On Site Recording (Hudson, Ohio)
- Jimmy Abegg – cover illustration
- Eric Elwell – album production coordinator for MWS Productions
- Jason McArthur – label production coordinator
- Chris Schultz – production manager
- Ben Pearson – photography
- Glen Rose – photography
- Scott Hughes – art direction
- Stephanie McBrayer – art direction
- Ian Black – design
- Tim Parker – design
- B. Joyner – design
- Jamie Kearney – styling
- Cheryl Guillot – hair and make-up

== Charts ==
=== Weekly charts ===
Chart (2001)	Peak position
US Billboard 200	20
US Top Christian Albums (Billboard)	1

=== Year-end charts ===
Chart (2002)	Position
US Billboard 200	84

== Certifications ==
Country	Peak	Sales	Certifications (sales thresholds)
Canada (CRIA)	n/a	50,000	Gold
United States (RIAA)	20	2,000,000	2× Platinum
