= Michael W. Smith discography =

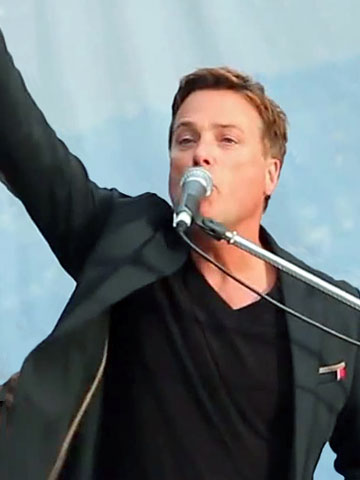
- Michael W. Smith performing in June 2014
- Studio albums: 15
- Live albums: 6
- Compilation albums: 3
- Singles: 80
- Video albums: 3as
- Christmas albums: 4
- Instrumental albums: 2
- Box sets: 3

The discography of Michael W. Smith, an American contemporary Christian musician, consists of 15 studio albums and 80 singles as well as multiple Christmas albums, compilation albums, instrumental albums, and video releases. Smith has sold over 18 million albums as of May 2018. He has recorded more top-ten albums on the Billboard Christian Albums chart (31) than any other artist, and his 16 No. 1 albums on the chart are second only to Amy Grant.

In 1982, Smith was hired as a keyboardist for Grant and began writing and performing on her albums as well as touring with her as an opening act at her concerts. His first album, Michael W. Smith Project (1983), charted at No. 9 on the Billboard Christian Albums chart and was his first album to be certified gold by the Recording Industry Association of America (RIAA). His next albums, Michael W. Smith 2 (1984) and The Big Picture (1986), also charted in the top ten, but attempts to market The Big Picture to mainstream audiences did not succeed. I 2 (EYE) (1988) became Smith's first No. 1 album on the Christian Albums chart and his second gold album, and seven of its singles reached the top ten on the CCM Update Christian radio charts.

Go West Young Man (1990) became Smith's first album to chart on the Billboard 200, and the singles "Place in This World" and "For You" peaked at Nos. 6 and 60 on the Billboard Hot 100. The album was certified platinum by the RIAA and certified gold by Music Canada. Change Your World (1992) and I'll Lead You Home (1995) also received platinum certifications. "I Will Be Here for You", the lead single from Change Your World, topped the adult contemporary charts in the United States and Canada while charting at No. 8 in Canada and No. 27 on the Hot 100, and I'll Lead You Home was the first Christian album to debut in the top 20 on the Billboard 200.

Live the Life (1998), This Is Your Time (1999), and Healing Rain (2004) all received gold certifications; other gold-certified albums include the compilation album The First Decade (1983–1993) (1993), the holiday albums Christmas (1989) and Christmastime (1998), and the instrumental release Freedom (2000). Smith's live albums Worship (2001) and Worship Again (2002) have been certified double platinum and platinum, respectively, by the RIAA. His album Sovereign (2014) debuted at No. 10 on the Billboard 200, his highest career ranking on the chart. His most recent studio album, A Million Lights (2018), was released a week apart from his live album Surrounded (2018); both albums charted at No. 2 on the Christian Albums chart.

== Albums ==
=== Studio albums ===
List of studio albums, with chart positions and certifications
Title	Album details	Peak chart positions		Certifications
Title	Album details	US	US Christ	Certifications
Michael W. Smith Project	Released: March 15, 1983; Label: Reunion Records; Format: CD, cassette, digital download, LP	—	9	RIAA: Gold
Michael W. Smith 2	Released: February 23, 1984; Label: Reunion; Format: CD, cassette, digital download, LP	—	4	
The Big Picture	Released: February 1, 1986; Label: Reunion; Format: CD, cassette, digital download, LP	—	2	
i 2 (EYE)	Released: August 15, 1988; Label: Reunion; Format: CD, cassette, digital download, LP	—	1	RIAA: Gold
Go West Young Man	Released: September 24, 1990; Label: Reunion; Format: CD, cassette, digital download, LP	74	1	RIAA: Platinum; MC: Gold
Change Your World	Released: August 21, 1992; Label: Reunion; Format: CD, cassette, digital download, LP	86	1	RIAA: Platinum
I'll Lead You Home	Released: August 1, 1995; Label: Reunion; Format: CD, cassette, digital download	16	1	RIAA: Platinum
Live the Life	Released: April 28, 1998; Label: Reunion; Format: CD, cassette, digital download	23	1	RIAA: Gold
This Is Your Time	Released: November 23, 1999; Label: Reunion; Format: CD, digital download	21	1	RIAA: Gold
Healing Rain	Released: October 26, 2004; Label: Reunion; Format: CD, digital download, DualDisc	11	1	RIAA: Gold
Stand	Released: November 7, 2006; Label: Reunion; Format: CD, digital download	48	1	
Wonder	Released: September 28, 2010; Label: Reunion; Format: CD, digital download	26	2	
Sovereign	Released: May 13, 2014; Label: Sparrow Records/The MWS Group; Format: CD, digital download, LP	10	1	
A Million Lights	Released: February 16, 2018; Label: Rocketown Records; Format: CD, digital download	— (Note: A Million Lights did not chart on the Billboard 200, but it did peak at No. 42 on the component Top Album Sales chart.)	2	
Still, Vol. 1	Released: October 9, 2020; Label: Rocketown; Format: CD, Digital download	—	42	
"—" denotes releases that did not chart

=== Box sets ===
List of box sets, with chart positions
Title	Album details	Peak chart positions	
Title	Album details	US Christ	US Holiday
The Wonder Years	Released: November 23, 1993; Label: Reunion Records; Format: CD; Contains: Two CDs and a 24-page spiral-bound book	30	—
The Christmas Collection	Released: September 28, 2004; Label: Reunion; Format: CD, digital download; Contains: Christmas and Chistmastime	14	24
The Ultimate Christmas Collection	Released: October 13, 2009; Label: Reunion; Format: CD, digital download; Contains: Christmas, Christmastime, and It's a Wonderful Christmas	46	—
"—" denotes releases that did not chart.

=== Compilation albums ===
List of compilation albums, with chart positions and certifications
Title	Album details	Peak chart positions		Certifications
Title	Album details	US	US Christ	Certifications
The First Decade (1983–1993)	Released: September 30, 1993; Label: Reunion; Format: CD, cassette, digital download	—	1	RIAA: Gold
The Second Decade (1993–2003)	Released: October 7, 2003; Label: Reunion; Format: CD, digital download	38	1	
Decades of Worship	Released: January 12, 2012; Label: Provident Label Group; Format: CD, digital download	99	5	
"—" denotes the album did not chart.

=== Christmas albums ===
List of Christmas albums, with chart positions and certifications
Title	Album details	Peak chart positions			Certifications
Title	Album details	US	US Christ	US Holiday	Certifications
Christmas	Released: September 1, 1989; Label: Reunion; Format: CD, cassette, digital download, LP	—	3	—	RIAA: Gold
Christmastime	Released: October 13, 1998; Label: Reunion; Format: CD, cassette, digital download	90	5	4	RIAA: Gold
It's a Wonderful Christmas	Released: October 14, 2007; Label: Reunion; Format: CD, cassette, digital download	54	2	2	
The Spirit of Christmas	Released: September 30, 2014; Label: Sparrow Records/The MWS Group; Format: CD, cassette, digital download	16	1	1	
"—" denotes releases that did not chart

=== Instrumental albums ===
List of instrumental albums, with chart positions and certifications
Title	Album details	Peak chart positions		Certifications
Title	Album details	US	US Christ	Certifications
Freedom	Released: November 21, 2000; Label: Reunion; Format: CD, cassette, digital download	70	2	RIAA: Gold
Glory	Released: November 22, 2011; Label: Reunion; Format: CD, digital download	121	7	

=== Live albums ===
List of live albums, with chart positions and certifications
Title	Album details	Peak chart positions		Certifications
Title	Album details	US	US Christ	Certifications
The Live Set	Released: July 7, 1987; Label: Reunion; Format: CD, cassette, digital download, LP	—	4	
Worship	Released: September 11, 2001; Label: Reunion; Format: CD, cassette, digital download, DualDisc	20	1	RIAA: 2× Platinum; MC: Gold
Worship Again	Released: September 19, 2002; Label: Reunion; Format: CD, digital download	14	1	RIAA: Platinum
A New Hallelujah	Released: October 28, 2008; Label: Reunion; Format: CD, digital download	19	1	
Surrounded	Released: February 23, 2018; Label: Rocketown Records; Format: CD, digital download	188	2	
Awaken: The Surrounded Experience	Released: February 22, 2019; Label: Rocketown; Format: CD, digital download	— (Note: Awaken: The Surrounded Experience did not chart on the Billboard 200, but it did peak at No. 73 on the component Top Album Sales chart.)	13	
Worship Forever (Live)	Released: September 10, 2021; Label: Rocketown; Format: CD, digital download	—	4	
"—" denotes releases that did not chart

=== Other albums ===
List of other albums, with chart positions and certifications
Title	Album details	Peak chart positions		
Title	Album details	US	US Christ	US Kid
Hymns	Released: March 24, 2014; Label: Cracker Barrel; Format: CD, digital download	25	1	—
Hymns II – Shine on Us	Released: January 29, 2016; Label: Cracker Barrel; Format: CD, digital download	172	3	—
Lullaby	Released: May 4, 2018; Label: Rocketown/The Fuel Music; Format: CD, digital download	—	—	8
Worthy is the Lamb (Live)	Released: March 15, 2024; Label: Rocketown/The Fuel Music	—	—	—
"—" denotes releases that did not chart

=== Videos ===
List of video releases, with chart positions and certifications
Title	Album details	Peak chart positions	Certifications
Title	Album details	US Video	Certifications
Worship	Released: August 20, 2002; Label: Reunion; Format: DVD, VHS	1	RIAA: Platinum; MC: Gold
Live in Concert – A 20 Year Celebration	Released: February 10, 2004; Label: Reunion; Format: DVD	12	RIAA: Gold
A New Hallelujah: The Live Worship DVD	Released: March 17, 2009; Label: Reunion; Format: DVD	2	
"—" denotes releases that did not chart

== Singles ==
=== 1980s ===
List of singles, with chart positions
Title	Year	Peak chart positions		Album
Title	Year	US Christ AC	US Christ CHR	Album
"Great Is the Lord"	1983	1		Michael W. Smith Project
"Could He Be the Messiah"	1983	21		Michael W. Smith Project
"Friends" (w/ Amy Grant)	1983	7		Michael W. Smith Project
"Hosanna"	1984	2		Michael W. Smith 2
"I Am Sure"	1984	8		Michael W. Smith 2
"I Know"	1986	5	1	The Live Set
"Rocketown"	1986	1	1	The Big Picture
"Voices"	1986	5	19	The Big Picture
"Wired for Sound"	1986	—	4	The Big Picture
"Old Enough to Know"	1987	24	6	The Big Picture
"Emily"	1987	8	1	The Live Set
"Nothin' But the Blood"	1987	28	5	The Live Set
"Friends (Live)"	1988	34	13	The Live Set
"Pray for Me"	1988	1	2	I 2 (EYE)
"Help You Find Your Way"	1988	—	13	I 2 (EYE)
"Hand of Providence"	1988	2	4	I 2 (EYE)
"I Miss the Way"	1989	4	—	I 2 (EYE)
"Live and Learn"	1989	7	7	I 2 (EYE)
"The Throne"	1989	1	1	I 2 (EYE)
"On the Other Side"	1989	2	3	I 2 (EYE)
"Holy, Holy, Holy"	1989	5	—	Our Hymns
"—" denotes releases that did not chart

=== 1990s ===
List of singles, with chart positions
Title	Year	Peak chart positions						Album
Title	Year	US	US AC	US Christ AC	US Christ CHR	CAN	CAN AC	Album
"I Hear Leesha"	1990	—	—	7	5	—	—	I 2 (EYE)
"Go West Young Man"	1990	—	—	2	1	—	—	Go West Young Man
"Place in This World" (original or with For King & Country)	1991	6	5	1	1	25	8	Go West Young Man
"How Long Will Be Too Long"	1991	—	—	3	2	—	—	Go West Young Man
"For You"	1991	60	20	2	1	65	12	Go West Young Man
"Seed to Sow"	1992	—	—	4	2	—	—	Go West Young Man
"Cross My Heart"	1992	—	—	3	—	—	—	Go West Young Man
"Love Crusade"	1992	—	—	—	4	—	—	Go West Young Man
"I Will Be Here for You"	1992	27	1	2	1	8	1	Change Your World
"Somebody Love Me"	1993	71	10	12	4	32	11	Change Your World
"Give It Away"	1993	—	—	1	1	—	—	Change Your World
"Picture Perfect"	1993	— (Note: "Picture Perfect" did not chart on the Billboard Hot 100, but it did peak at No. 16 on the Bubbling Under Hot 100 singles chart.)	—	25	1	—	—	Change Your World
"Kentucky Rose"	1993	—	—	12	25	—	—	The First Decade (1983–1993)
"Cross of Gold"	1994	—	—	—	24	—	—	Change Your World
"Cry for Love"	1995	—	—	1	1	—	—	I'll Lead You Home
"Straight to the Heart"	1995	—	—	3	25	—	—	I'll Lead You Home
"Breakdown"	1995	—	—	—	4	—	—	I'll Lead You Home
"I'll Lead You Home"	1996	—	—	2	2	—	—	I'll Lead You Home
"I'll Be Around"	1996	—	—	1	3	—	—	I'll Lead You Home
"A Little Stronger Every Day"	1996	—	—	2	5	—	—	I'll Lead You Home
"Someday"	1996	—	—	5	3	—	—	I'll Lead You Home
"Emmanuel" (w/ Amy Grant)	1996	—	—	37	—	—	—	Emmanuel: A Musical Celebration of the Life of Christ
"Jesus Is the Answer"	1997	—	—	4	9	—	—	Tribute: The Songs of Andrae Crouch
"Live the Life"	1997	—	—	1	3	—	—	Live the Life
"Love Me Good"	1998	61	—	5	4	—	—	Live the Life
"Never Been Unloved"	1998	—	—	1	9	—	—	Live the Life
"Missing Person"	1998	—	—	1	2	—	—	Live the Life
"Christmastime"	1998	—	—	12	—	—	—	Christmastime
"Let Me Show You the Way"	1999	—	—	1	16	—	—	Live the Life
"This is Your Time"	1999	—	25	1	5	—	—	This Is Your Time
"—" denotes releases that did not chart

=== 2000–present ===
List of singles, with chart positions
Title	Year	Peak chart positions			Certifications	Album
Title	Year	US AC	US Christ.	Christ. Airplay	Certifications	Album
"I Will Be Your Friend"	2000	—	— (Note: "I Will Be Your Friend" was released before the Billboard Christian Songs chart was created, but it did peak at No. 2 on The CCM Update Adult Contemporary chart.)			This Is Your Time
"I Still Have the Dream"	2000	—	— (Note: "I Still Have the Dream" was released before the Billboard Christian Songs chart was created, but it did peak at No. 7 on The CCM Update Christian Hit Radio chart.)			This Is Your Time
"Worth It All"	2000	—	— (Note: "Worth It All" was released before the Billboard Christian Songs chart was created, but it did peak at Nos. 4 and 7 on The CCM Update Adult Contemporary and Christian Hit Radio charts, respectively.)			This Is Your Time
"Above All"	2001	—	— (Note: "Above All" was released before the Billboard Christian Songs chart was created, but it did peak at Nos. 1 and 17 on The CCM Update Adult Contemporary and Christian Hit Radio charts, respectively.)			Worship
"Breathe"	2002	—	— (Note: "Breathe" was released before the Billboard Christian Songs chart was created, but it did peak at No. 18 on the Radio & Records Christian AC chart.)			Worship
"Purified"	2002	—	— (Note: "Purified" was released before the Billboard Christian Songs chart was created, but it did peak at Nos. 1 and 24 on the Radio & Records INSPO and Christian AC charts, respectively.)			Worship
"Lord Have Mercy"	2002	—	— (Note: "Lord Have Mercy" was released before the Billboard Christian Songs chart was created, but it did peak at Nos. 1 and 9 on the Radio & Records INSPO and Christian AC charts, respectively.)			Worship Again
"Step by Step/Forever We Will Sing"	2003	—	21			Worship Again
"Friends 2003"	2003	—	39			The Second Decade (1993–2003)
"Signs"	2003	—	12			The Second Decade (1993–2003)
"Healing Rain"	2004	—	5			Healing Rain
"Here I Am"	2005	—	— (Note: "Here I Am" did not chart on the Billboard Christian Songs chart, but it did peak at No. 1 and 3 on the Radio & Records INSPO and Christian AC Indicator charts, respectively.)			Healing Rain
"Bridge Over Troubled Water"	2005	28	29			Healing Rain
"All in the Serve"	2006	—	36			The Second Chance
"Come to the Cross"	2006	—	19			Stand
"Be Lifted High"	2007	—	— (Note: "Be Lifted High" did not chart on the Billboard Christian Songs chart, but it did peak at No. 26 on the Billboard Christian AC Songs chart.)			Stand
"Christmas Day" (w/ Mandisa)	2007	18	2			It's a Wonderful Christmas
"A New Hallelujah" (w/ the African Children's Choir)	2008	—	14			A New Hallelujah
"Mighty to Save"	2009	—	25			A New Hallelujah
"Save Me From Myself"	2010	—	— (Note: "Save Me From Myself" did not chart on the Billboard Christian Songs chart, but it did peak at No. 50 on the Billboard Christian/Gospel Digital Songs chart.)			Wonder
"I'll Wait for You"	2010	—	—			Wonder
"You Won't Let Go"	2014	—	13	16		Sovereign
"Sovereign Over Us"	2014	—	—	38		Sovereign
"Sky Spills Over"	2015	—	18	20		Sovereign
"A Million Lights"	2017	24	44	47		A Million Lights
"Surrounded (Fight My Battles)"	2018	—	33	—		Surrounded
"Waymaker" (with Vanessa Campagna and Madelyn Berry)	2019	—	3	1	RIAA: Gold	Awaken: The Surrounded Experience
"Silver Bells" (with Amy Grant and Marc Martel)	2019	—	22	7		Non-album singles
"Canto Ancora/Sing Again" (with Jonathan Cilia Faro)	2022	—	—	—		Non-album singles
"Arms Around the Sun"	2025	—	—	—		Non-album singles
"Your Love is a Flood"	2025	—	—	—		Non-album singles
"Kingdom Come"	2025	—	—	—		Non-album singles
"Hymn for Communion"	2026	—	—	—		Non-album singles
"—" denotes releases that did not chart

=== As featured artist ===
List of singles as featured artist, with chart positions
Title	Year	Peak chart positions		Album
Title	Year	US AC	Christ. Airplay	Album
"Love of My Life" (Jim Brickman featuring Michael W. Smith)	1999	9	—	Destiny
"All Is Well" (Jordan Smith featuring Michael W. Smith)	2018	—	22	Non-album single
"Love God Love People" (Danny Gokey featuring Michael W. Smith)	2020	—	—	Haven't Seen It Yet
"—" denotes releases that did not chart

=== Other charted songs ===
List of other charted songs, with chart positions
Title	Year	Peak chart positions		Album
Title	Year	US Christ.	Christ. Airplay	Album
"Missing Person"	2003	40		Live The Life
"All Is Well" (with Carrie Underwood)	2013	6	22	The Spirit of Christmas
"White Christmas" (with Lady Antebellum)	2013	39	—	The Spirit of Christmas
"It's the Most Wonderful Time of the Year"	2014	38	24	The Spirit of Christmas
"Happy Holiday/Holiday Season"	2014	39	22	The Spirit of Christmas
"Silent Night" (with Little Big Town)	2014	48	—	The Spirit of Christmas
"Almost There" (with Amy Grant)	2014	27	35	The Spirit of Christmas
"Christmas Day" (with Jennifer Nettles)	2014	49	—	The Spirit of Christmas
"Reve du Noel"	2017	—	43	Our Christmas
"—" denotes releases that did not chart
