= The First Decade (1983–1993) =

Compilation album by Michael W. Smith
- Released: October 12, 1993
- Recorded: 1982–1993
- Genre: Contemporary Christian music
- Length: 67:24
- Label: Reunion
- Producer: Michael W. Smith; Mark Hammond; Mark Heimmerman; Wayne Kirkpatrick; Bryan Lenox; John Potoker

Michael W. Smith chronology
The Wonder Years; 1983–1993 (1993)	The First Decade (1983–1993) (1993)	I'll Lead You Home (1995)

Professional ratings
Review scores
Source	Rating
AllMusic	5/5 stars

The First Decade (1983–1993) is a compilation album from Christian recording artist Michael W. Smith. This album also features two new songs "Do You Dream of Me?" and "Kentucky Rose". A follow-up compilation album, The Second Decade (1993–2003), was released ten years later, picking up where The First Decade left off.

== Track listing ==
No.	Title	Writer(s)	Original album	Length
1.	"Do You Dream of Me?"	Amy Grant, Beverly Darnall, Michael W. Smith	new recording	4:19
2.	"Kentucky Rose"	Wayne Kirkpatrick, Michael W. Smith	new recording	5:27
3.	"Picture Perfect"		Change Your World (1992)	3:55
4.	"I Will Be Here for You"		Change Your World (1992)	4:35
5.	"Give It Away"		Change Your World (1992)	5:07
6.	"Place in This World"		Go West Young Man (1990)	3:59
7.	"Go West Young Man"		Go West Young Man (1990)	3:55
8.	"Pray for Me"		i 2 (EYE) (1988)	3:54
9.	"Secret Ambition"		i 2 (EYE) (1988)	6:27
10.	"Emily"		Go West Young Man (1990)	4:19
11.	"Old Enough to Know"		The Big Picture (1986)	4:48
12.	"Rocketown"		The Big Picture (1986)	4:35
13.	"I Am Sure"		Michael W. Smith 2 (1984)	4:44
14.	"Friends"		Change Your World (1992)	4:41
15.	"Great Is the Lord"		Michael W. Smith Project (1983)	2:54

== Personnel ==
Credits for new recordings

- Michael W. Smith – lead vocals, backing vocals (1), acoustic piano (2)
- Mark Hammond – keyboard programming (1), bass and drum programming (1)
- Mark Heimmerman – keyboards (2), backing vocals (2)
- Phil Madeira – Hammond B3 organ (2)
- Jerry Dale McFadden – accordion (2)
- Dann Huff – guitars (1, 2)
- Gary Chapman – pedabro (2), backing vocals (2)
- Jerry McPherson – mandolin (2)
- Tommy Sims – bass (2)
- Steve Brewster – drums (2)
- Terry McMillan – percussion (2), harmonica (2)
- Amy Grant – backing vocals (1)
- Chris Harris – backing vocals (2)

== Production ==
- Michael Blanton – executive producer
- Michael W. Smith – executive producer, co-producer (2), producer (3-15)
- Mark Hammond – producer (1)
- Mark Heimmerman – producer (2-5), mixing (2)
- Bryan Lenox – co-producer (6, 7, 10)
- Wayne Kirkpatrick – producer (8, 9)
- John Potoker – producer (11, 12)
- Ronnie Brookshire – engineer (1), mixing (1)
- Todd Robbins – engineer (1)
- Joe Baldridge – engineer (2), mixing (2)
- James "JB" Baird – engineer (2)
- Dave Dillbeck – second engineer (1)
- Amy Hughes – second engineer (2)
- David Hall – mix assistant (2)
- Nick Sparks – technician assistant (1)
- Hank Williams – mastering (1, 2)
- Julee Brand – cover coordinator
- Elizabeth Simmons – cover coordinator
- Buddy Jackson – art direction
- D.L. Rhodes – art direction
- Beth Middleworth – design
- Mark Tucker – photography
- June Arnold – grooming

Studios

- Recorded at Deer Valley Studio and Fun Attic Studio (Franklin, Tennessee); Quad Studios (Nashville, Tennessee).
- Mixed at Emerald Sound Studios and Sixteenth Avenue Sound (Nashville, Tennessee).
- Mastered at MasterMix (Nashville, Tennessee).

== Chart performance ==
Chart (1993)	Peak position
US Top Christian Albums (Billboard)	1
