= The Live Set =

Live album by Michael W. Smith
- Released: March 1, 1987
- Recorded: 1986
- Genre: Christian rock
- Length: 62:43
- Label: Reunion

Michael W. Smith chronology
The Big Picture (1986)	The Live Set (1987)	i 2 (EYE) (1988)

Singles from The Live Set
- 1. "I Know" Released: 1987

Professional ratings
Review scores
Source	Rating
AllMusic	3/5 stars

The Live Set is the first live album from Michael W. Smith. Released in 1986, it features selections from his first three previous studio albums (The Big Picture, Michael W. Smith 2, and Michael W. Smith Project) and introduces three new songs.

The opening track, "Nothin' but the Blood", is the first of the new songs. It is a modern re-working of Robert Lowry's classic hymn "Nothing but the Blood." "I Know" was released to radio as a single (the radio edit is only available commercially on The Wonder Years). "Emily" would later receive a studio release on Smith's 1990 studio album Go West Young Man.

The band included Wayne Kirkpatrick, Chris Rodriguez, David Huff, Mark Heimermann and Chris Harris. A video version of the concert was also available commercially.

== Track listing ==
CD release
No.	Title	Length
1.	"Nothin' but the Blood"	3:42
2.	"Lamu"	8:26
3.	"You're Alright"	4:55
4.	"Could He Be the Messiah"	5:17
5.	"Rocketown"	6:18
6.	"Emily"	3:51
7.	"I Know"	4:29
8.	"Friends"	4:05
9.	"Old Enough to Know"	6:01
10.	"Pursuit of the Dream"	6:02
11.	"Be Strong and Courageous"	4:21
12.	"You Need a Savior"	6:25

LP release
No.	Title	Length
1.	"Nothin' But the Blood"	3:42
2.	"You're Alright"	4:55
3.	"Could He Be the Messiah"	5:17
4.	"Rocketown"	6:18
5.	"Emily"	3:51
6.	"I Know"	4:29
7.	"Friends"	4:05
8.	"Old Enough to Know"	6:01
9.	"You Need a Savior"	6:25

== Chart performance ==
Chart (1986)	Peak position
US Christian Albums (Billboard)	4
