= Glen Campbell Live =

Glen Campbell Live may refer to:

- Glen Campbell Live (1969 album), a 1969 album by Glen Campbell
- Glen Campbell Live (1981 album), a 1981 album by Glen Campbell, released only in the UK

== See also ==
- Glen Campbell Live! His Greatest Hits, a 1994 album by Glen Campbell
