= The Wonder Years (Michael W. Smith box set) =

The Wonder Years 1983–1993

Box set by Michael W. Smith
- Released: January 1, 1993
- Recorded: 1982–1992
- Genre: Contemporary Christian music
- Length: 144:19
- Label: Reunion

Michael W. Smith chronology
Change Your World (1992)	The Wonder Years 1983–1993 (1993)	The First Decade (1983-1993) (1993)

The Wonder Years 1983–1993 is two-CD package compilation album with accompanying book released by Reunion Records in 1993, and is intended to be a greatest hits album with a career retrospective of the contemporary Christian musician, Michael W. Smith. The elaborate slipcase packaging contains a 10.5 by 6 inches (27 cm × 15 cm) spiral-bound book that contains facing pairs of pages highlighting each of his prior eight albums. Each spread featured photographs and an accompanying background story on this period in his career. Inside the back cover are two trays which contain the two picture CDs.

The album won a Dove Award for Recorded Music Packaging of the Year at the 25th GMA Dove Awards in 1994. This album has since gone out of print in favor of the more modest (and more focused) greatest hits collection The First Decade (1983-1993), which was released later that same year. This album is also notable to collectors for being the only issued CD containing the radio single version of "I Know" from The Live Set.

== Track listing ==
Disc one
No.	Title	Writer(s)	Length
1.	"Friends"	M. Smith, D. Smith	4:40
2.	"You Need a Savior"		3:35
3.	"Could He Be the Messiah"		4:29
4.	"Great Is the Lord"	D. Smith, M. Smith	2:52
5.	"A Way"	M. Smith, Gary Chapman, Tim Marsh	3:49
6.	"Hosanna"	M. Smith, D. Smith	2:29
7.	"I Am Sure"	M. Smith, Mike Hudson	4:41
8.	"Pursuit of the Dream"		5:11
9.	"Lamu"	M. Smith, Wayne Kirkpatrick, Amy Grant	5:55
10.	"Rocketown"		4:32
11.	"Old Enough to Know"		4:47
12.	"Goin' Thru the Motions"		4:55
13.	"I Know"		4:29
14.	"Emily"	M. Smith, Kirkpatrick	4:17
15.	"Secret Ambition"	Smith, Kirkpatrick, Grant	6:26
16.	"Pray for Me"		3:53
17.	"I Miss the Way"		4:34

Disc two
No.	Title	Length
1.	"I Hear Leesha"	5:26
2.	"The Throne"	6:55
3.	"All is Well"	4:08
4.	"Gloria"	5:03
5.	"Go West Young Man"	3:54
6.	"Love Crusade"	4:23
7.	"Place in This World"	3:58
8.	"Seed to Sow"	6:14
9.	"For You"	4:10
10.	"Picture Perfect"	3:58
11.	"I Will Be Here for You"	4:35
12.	"Somewhere Somehow" (duet with Amy Grant)	4:21
13.	"Give It Away"	5:07
14.	"Love One Another"	4:53
15.	"Cross of Gold"	4:20

== Chart performance ==
=== Weekly charts ===
Chart (1993)	Peak position
US Christian Albums (Billboard)	30
