= The Wonder Years (disambiguation) =

The Wonder Years is an American drama-comedy television series aired from 1988 to 1993.

The Wonder Years may also refer to:

- The Wonder Years (2021 TV series), an American television series inspired by the 1988 series
- The Wonder Years (band), a rock band
- The Wonder Years (Michael W. Smith box set), a 1993 compilation album by Michael W. Smith
- The Wonder Years (Wonder Girls album), a 2007 album by the Wonder Girls
- The Wonder Years (9th Wonder album), a 2011 album by 9th Wonder
- "The Wonder Years", a song by Reks from the 2011 album Rhythmatic Eternal King Supreme
