= Christmas with Glen Campbell =

Christmas with Glen Campbell may refer to:

- Christmas with Glen Campbell (1971 album)
- Christmas with Glen Campbell (1995 album)
- Christmas with Glen Campbell (video)
