= I Will Be Here for You =

Single by Michael W. Smith

from the album Change Your World
- B-side: "Color Blind"
- Released: September 1992
- Genre: Pop rock
- Length: 4:35
- Label: Reunion
- Songwriters: Michael W. Smith, Diane Warren
- Producers: Michael W. Smith, Mark Heimermann

Michael W. Smith singles chronology
"Go West Young Man" (1990)	"I Will Be Here for You" (1992)	"Christmas Day" (2007)

Music video
- "I Will Be Here for You" on YouTube

"I Will Be Here for You" is a 1992 single written by Diane Warren and Michael W. Smith and performed by Smith. The single was a track from his album Change Your World and was a hit on the Adult Contemporary chart, reaching No. 1 for two weeks and also peaking at No. 27 on the U.S. Billboard Hot 100. On Cash Box, the song peaked at No. 24.

== Charts ==
=== Weekly charts ===
Chart (1992–93)	Peak position
Canada RPM Adult Contemporary	1
Canada RPM Top Singles	8
US Billboard Hot 100	27
US Adult Contemporary (Billboard)	1
US Pop Airplay (Billboard)	19
US Cash Box Top 100	24

=== Year-end charts ===
Chart (1992)	Position
US Adult Contemporary (Billboard)	36

== Personnel ==
- Michael W. Smith – lead vocals, keyboards
- Mike Lawler – additional keyboards
- Dann Huff – guitars
- Gary Lunn – bass
- Mark Hammond – drum programming
- Terry McMillan – percussion
- Barry Green – trombone
- Chris McDonald – trombone, horn arrangements
- Mike Haynes – trumpet
- George Tidwell – trumpet
- The Nashville String Machine – strings
- Ronn Huff – string arrangements
- Carl Gorodetsky – concertmaster
- Michael Black – backing vocals
- Chris Harris – backing vocals
- Mark Heimmerman – backing vocals
- Wayne Kirkpatrick – backing vocals
