= A Million Lights (Michael W. Smith album) =

Studio album by Michael W. Smith
- Released: February 16, 2018
- Recorded: 2017
- Studios: The Manor and 2220 Record Studios (Nashville, Tennessee); The Void (Franklin, Tennessee)
- Genres: CCM; pop
- Length: 49:12
- Label: Rocketown Records
- Producers: Bryan Todd; Kyle Lee; Paul Moak

Michael W. Smith chronology
Hymns II - Shines On Us (2016)	A Million Lights (2018)	Surrounded (2018)

Singles from A Million Lights
- 1. "A Million Lights" Released: October 27, 2017

A Million Lights is a studio album by Christian recording artist Michael W. Smith, released on February 16, 2018. It was his first pop album in four years and a follow-up to Sovereign (2014). The album was a new musical direction for Smith and marked a departure from his previous sound.

== Background ==
Smith began working on this album in January 2017, under the title Revolution. Originally it was set to be released in October 2017 but ultimately was postponed to February 2018. The first single from the album, "A Million Lights", was released on August 11, 2017. The album is a mix of pop music with some EDM influences.

== Critical reception ==
Professional ratings
Review scores
Source	Rating
CCM Magazine	4/5 stars

John Palluska from ChristianHeadlines.com gave the album an overwhelmingly positive review, describing it as "one of the best albums to come out in Christian music."

== Track listing ==
No.	Title	Writer(s)	Length
1.	"A Million Lights"	Kyle Lee, Michael W. Smith	3:36
2.	"Conversation"	Bryan Todd, Jason Walker, Smith	4:03
3.	"Something In My Heart"	Bryan Todd, Walker, Smith	3:27
4.	"Footsteps"	Walker, Chris Davenport, Smith	3:36
5.	"Your Love"	Lee, Smith	3:55
6.	"Love Always Wins"	Thad Cockrell, Smith	3:45
7.	"Crashing Waves"	Jonathan Jackson, Smith	4:18
8.	"Louder"	Bryan Todd, Walker, Smith	3:50
9.	"Revolution"	Ryan Smith, Alan Robertson, Smith	3:03
10.	"Hey Love" (featuring Jordin Sparks)	Wayne Kirkpatrick, Smith	3:46
11.	"You Make Me Feel This Way"	Bryan Todd, Walker, Smith	3:25
12.	"Forgive"	Wes King, Smith	4:09
13.	"Who You Are"	Cindy Morgan, Smith	4:19

== Personnel ==
- Michael W. Smith – vocals, backing vocals (1–7, 11, 12), vocoder (1, 7), acoustic piano (1, 5–7, 9, 10, 12), organ (1, 7), programming (2–4, 8, 9, 11, 12), acoustic guitars (6, 11), electric guitars (6, 7), orchestration (12)
- Kyle Lee – acoustic piano (1, 5, 6), synthesizer programming (1, 5–7), bass (1, 5–7), drum programming (1, 5–7), backing vocals (1, 5, 7), electric guitars (5, 7), acoustic guitars (6, 7), Rhodes electric piano (6)
- Joe Thibodeau – synthesizer programming (1, 5, 6), drum programming (1, 5, 6)
- Bryan Todd – programming (2–4, 8–12), backing vocals (9)
- Matt Stanfield – acoustic piano (13), synthesizer (13)
- Paul Moak – synthesizer (13), electric guitar (13), slide guitar (13)
- Casey Moore – electric guitars (1, 5–7)
- Jonathan Martin Berry – acoustic guitar (3, 8, 9, 11, 12), electric guitar (3, 4, 8, 9, 11, 12)
- Stuart Garrard – electric guitars (5, 7, 13)
- Kris Donegan – acoustic guitar (13)
- Matt Pierson – bass (13)
- Jacob Arnold – drums (5, 6)
- Chris Leidhecker – drums (6, 7)
- Fred Eltringham – drums (13), tambourine (13)
- Brent Milligan – upright bass (10), cello (12)
- Carol Rabinowitz – cello (10)
- Kristin Wilkinson – viola (10)
- David Davidson – violin (10), orchestration (10)
- Conni Ellisor – violin (10)
- Jason Walker – backing vocals (2–4, 8, 9, 11)
- Vanessa Campagna – backing vocals (3, 8, 9, 12)
- Thad Cockrell – backing vocals (6)
- Calvin Nowell – group vocals (7)
- Debi Selby – group vocals (7)
- Emoni Wilkins – group vocals (7)
- Rebekah White – backing vocals (9)
- Jordin Sparks – vocals (10)

== Production ==
- Chaz Corzine – executive producer
- Greg Ham – executive producer
- Michael W. Smith – executive producer, co-producer
- Derek Spirk – associate executive producer
- Kyle Lee – producer (1, 5–7), engineer (1, 5–7), mixing (1, 5–7)
- Bryan Todd – producer (2–4, 8–12), engineer (2–4, 8–12), mixing (2–4, 8–12)
- Paul Moak – producer (13), mixing (13)
- Devin Vaughan – engineer (13)
- Brendan Gelais – assistant engineer (13)
- Zack Zinick – assistant engineer (13)
- Bob Boyd – mastering at Ambient Digital (Houston, Texas)
- Keelin Crew – A&R administration
- Jeremy Cowart – photography
- Brody Harper – creative director
- Nick DePartee – art, design
- The MWS Group – management

== Charts ==
Chart performance for A Million Lights
Chart (2018)	Peak position
US Top Christian Albums (Billboard)	2
US Independent Albums (Billboard)	8
US Top Album Sales (Billboard)	42

Singles
Year	Single	US peak chart positions	
Year	Single	Christ.	Christ. Airplay
2018	"A Million Lights"	44	47
