= Renegade Gentleman =

Studio album by Larry Carlton
- Released: 1993
- Recorded: March 1991 – April 1993
- Studio: Nightingale Recording Studio (Nashville, Tennessee); Room 335 and Music Grinder Studios (Hollywood, California); Track Record Studios (North Hollywood, California); O'Henry Sound Studios and Monday To Sunday (Burbank, California)
- Genre: Jazz fusion
- Length: 56:13
- Label: GRP
- Producer: Larry Carlton

Professional ratings
Review scores
Source	Rating
AllMusic	3/5 stars

Renegade Gentleman is an album by Larry Carlton that was released by GRP in 1993.

== Track listing ==
All tracks are written by Larry Carlton, unless otherwise indicated.

No.	Title	Writer(s)	Length
1.	"Crazy Mama"	J.J. Cale	4:32
2.	"R.C.M."		5:05
3.	"Sleep Medicine"		4:20
4.	"Cold Day in Hell"	Barbara Jones, Terry McMillan	6:03
5.	"Anthem"		4:32
6.	"Amen A.C."	Carlton, McMillan	4:48
7.	"Never Say Naw"	Percy Mayfield	6:54
8.	"Farm Jazz"		5:26
9.	"Nothin' Comes"		5:58
10.	"Bogner"		4:46
11.	"Red Hot Poker"		3:49

== Personnel ==
- Larry Carlton – guitars, vocals (1, 7)
- Chuck Leavell – keyboards (1, 4, 6, 7, 9)
- Matt Rollings – keyboards (2, 3, 5, 8, 10, 11)
- Michael Rhodes – bass
- Chris Layton – drums (1, 4, 6, 7, 9)
- John Ferraro – drums (2, 3, 5, 8, 10, 11)
- Terry McMillan – harmonica, percussion (2, 3, 5, 8, 10, 11), vocals (4)

=== Production ===
- Dave Grusin – executive producer
- Larry Rosen – executive producer
- Larry Carlton – producer
- Michael Verdick – vocal producer (1), vocal engineer (1), engineer (2, 3, 5, 8, 10, 11)
- Ross Hogarth – engineer (1, 4, 6, 7, 9), mixing
- Dave Rouze – engineer (2, 3, 5, 8, 10, 11)
- John Kunz – assistant engineer (1, 4, 6, 7, 9)
- Kieren McClelland – assistant engineer (2, 3, 5, 8, 10, 11)
- Brett Swain – mix assistant
- Joe Gastwirt – mastering at Oceanview Digital Mastering (Los Angeles, California)
- Joseph Doughney – post-production
- Michael Landy – post-production
- Adam Zelinka – post-production
- The Review Room (New York City, New York) – post-production location
- Karen Andrew – production coordinator
- Sharon Mitchell – production coordinator
- Michael Pollard – GRP production coordinator
- Sonny Mediana – GRP production director
- Andy Baltimore – GRP creative director
- Michael Fitzgerald – art direction, concept
- John Beach – design
- Ron Slenzak – principal photography
- David Hawkins – additional photography
- Dana Allison – stylist
