= Somebody Like That =

Studio album by Glen Campbell
- Released: February 9, 1993
- Recorded: 1992, Masterfonics and Omni Sound Studio, Nashville, TN; Nightingale Recording Studio, Nashville, TN
- Genre: Country
- Label: Liberty
- Producer: Jerry Crutchfield

Glen Campbell chronology
Wings of Victory (1992)	Somebody Like That (1993)	Home for the Holidays (1993)

Professional ratings
Review scores
Source	Rating
AllMusic	3/5 stars

Somebody Like That is the fifty-first album by American singer/guitarist Glen Campbell, released in 1993.

== Track listing ==
1. "Somebody Like That" (Larry Bryant, Geoff Thurman) - 3:13
2. "Those Words" (Paul Overstreet) - 2:58
3. "I Will Be Here" (Steven Curtis Chapman) - 3:44
4. "Love's Old Song" (Jerry Crutchfield) - 2:21
5. "The One Who Hung the Moon" (Gene Dobbins, Michael Huffman, Bob Morrison) - 2:50
6. "Swimming Upstream" (Gary Nicholson, Bucky Jones) - 3:02
7. "The Best Part of Texas" (Troy Seals, Eddie Setser) - 3:42
8. "Ain't It Just Like Love" (Billy Burnette, Pat Robinson) - 2:31
9. "(If I'd Only Known) It Was the Last Time" (Archie P. Jordan, Naomi Martin) - 2:45
10. "Rising Above It All" (Jerry Foster, Bill Rice) - 2:50

== Personnel ==
- Glen Campbell - vocals
- Brent Mason - electric guitar
- Brent Rowan - electric guitar
- Steve Gibson - acoustic and electric guitars
- Weldon Myrick - steel guitar
- Stuart Duncan - fiddle, mandolin
- Michael Rhodes - bass guitar
- Gary Lunn - bass guitar
- Lonnie Wilson - drums
- Eddie Bayers - drums
- Paul Leim - drums
- John Willis - acoustic guitar
- David Hungate - bass guitar
- Matt Rollings - piano
- Johnny Neel - piano
- Fletcher Watson - piano, synthesizer
- Bob Mason - cello
- Strings - Nashville String Machine
- Background vocals - Louis Nunley, Curtis Young, Wayland Patton, Gregg Gordon, Steven Curtis Chapman

== Production ==
- Producer - Jerry Crutchfield
- String Arrangements - Bergen White
- "Somebody Like That", "Those Words", "I Will Be Here", "Swimming Upstream", "The Best Part Of Texas", "(If I'd Only Known) It Was The Last Time" digitally recorded at Masterfonics and Omni Sound Studio, Nashville, TN
- "Love's Old Song", "The One Who Hung The Moon", "Ain't It Just Like Love", "Rising Above It All" analog recorded at Nightingale Recording Studio, Nashville, TN
- Recording Engineers - Mark J. Coddington, Keith Compton, Joe Bogan
- Assistants - Paula Montondo, Patrick Kelly, Steve Tveit
- Mixed at Sound Stage Studio, Nashville, TN
- Mix Engineer - John Guess
- Assistant mix engineer - Marty Williams
- Mastered by Glenn Meadows at Masterfonics
- CD master tape prepared by Glenn Meadows
- Digital editing by Milan Bogdan
- Production coordination by Ginny Johnson
- Art direction - Mickey Braithwaithe
- Photography - Sandra Gillard

== Charts ==
Singles

Year	Single	US Country
1993	"Somebody Like That"	66
