= The Boy in Me =

Studio album by Glen Campbell
- Released: 15 April 1994
- Recorded: 1994, North Beach Studios, Franklin, TN
- Genre: Contemporary Christian
- Label: New Haven
- Producer: Ronnie Brookshire, Cliff Downs, Geoff Thurman

Glen Campbell chronology
| Home for the Holidays (1993) | The Boy in Me (1994) | Glen Campbell Live! His Greatest Hits (1994) |

Professional ratings
Review scores
| Source | Rating |
|---|---|
| AllMusic | 2/5 stars |
| The Encyclopedia of Popular Music | 2/5 stars |

The Boy in Me is an album by the American singer/guitarist Glen Campbell, released in 1994. It is an album of Christian music.

== Track listing ==
1. "The Boy in Me" (Kevin Stokes, Geoff Thurman) – (4:37)
2. "Living the Legacy" (Lowell Alexander, Geoff Thurman) – (4:18)
3. "Where Time Stands Still" (Shawn Craig, Geoff Thurman) – (4:21)
4. "Call It Even" (Kim Patton, Becky Thurman, Geoff Thurman) – (3:40)
5. "Come Harvest Time" (Lowell Alexander) – (3:58)
6. "The Best Is Yet to Come" (Robert Noland, Paul Smith, Geoff Thurman) – (4:22)
7. "Something to Die For" (Dave Clark, Michael Puryear, Geoff Thurman) – (4:03)
8. "Mercy's Eyes" (Mark Hauth, Geoff Thurman) – (4:06)
9. "All I Need Is You" (Ty Lacy, Geoff Thurman) – (4:26)
10. "Amazing Grace" (John Newton; Arr. by Geoff Thurman) – (4:15)

== Personnel ==
- Glen Campbell – vocals, acoustic guitar, bagpipes
- Geoff Thurman – backing vocals, keyboards, acoustic guitar, synth bass, percussion programming
- Tom Hemby – acoustic guitar and electric guitar
- Jackie Street – bass guitar
- Cliff Downs – drums/percussion
- Strings – Nashville String Machine
- Background vocals – Cliff Downs, Mike Eldred, Mara Gail Getz, Michael Mellett, Cheryl Rogers

== Production ==
- Producers – Ronnie Brookshire, Cliff Downs, Geoff Thurman
- Engineers – Ron Brookshire, Otto D'Angolo, Cliff Downs, Ashley Hydrick, Doug Sarrett, SouperDave Dillbeck
- Art direction – Doug Knopp/Powell Creative Group
- Recorded and mixed at North Beach Studios, Franklin, TN
- Mastering by Ken Love at Master Mis Studios, Nashville, TN

== Charts ==
Singles – CCM charts (United States)

| Year | Single | Adult Contemporary | Inspirational |
|---|---|---|---|
| 1994 | "The Best is Yet to Come" | 18 | 24 |
| 1994 | "The Boy in Me" | 29 | 17 |
| 1994 | "Come Harvest Time" | - | 13 |
