= Shake (John Schlitt album) =

Studio album by John Schlitt
- Released: 1995
- Genre: Christian rock
- Length: 43:26
- Label: Word, Epic
- Producer: Mark Heimermann; Dann Huff; David Huff; Greg Nelson

John Schlitt chronology
Shake (1995)	Unfit for Swine (1996)

Professional ratings
Review scores
Source	Rating
AllMusic	2.5/5 stars

Shake is the first solo album released by John Schlitt, lead singer of the Christian rock band Petra. It was released in the Spring of 1995.

== Track listing ==
1. "Wake the Dead" – 5:32 (words & music by Schlitt, Mark Heimermann and Dann Huff)
2. "Don't Look Back" – 3:47 (words & music by Schlitt and Jim Cooper)
3. "Show Me the Way" – 4:18 (words & music by Schlitt and Tommy Greer)
4. "Inside of You" – 4:44 (words & music by Billy Sprague, Heimermann, Dann Huff and Schlitt)
5. "Let It Show" – 4:32 (words & music by Schlitt, Heimermann and Dann Huff)
6. "Carry the Burden" – 4:19 (words & music by Schlitt, Dann & David Huff)
7. "One by One" – 4:01 (words & music by Joe Fair, Schlitt and Rich Gootee)
8. "Try Understanding His Heart" – 3:55 (words & music by Schlitt, Cooper and Ronny Cates)
9. "The Hard Way" – 3:32 (words & music by Tom Wanca and Mark H. Chesshir)
10. "The Road to Calvary" – 4:50 (words & music by Gootee, Schlitt and Cooper)

== Personnel ==
- John Schlitt – lead vocals, backing vocals (1–6, 9), harmony vocals (1, 2, 6)
- Mark Heimermann – keyboards (1, 3–5), backing vocals (1–6), drums (5), percussion (5)
- Blair Masters – additional keyboards (2, 6), additional programming (7, 8), keyboards (10)
- Jim Cooper – programming (7, 8), arrangements (7, 8)
- Dann Huff – guitars, bass (1, 2, 5, 6, 9), drums (1, 3, 5), percussion (1, 3, 5), keyboards (2, 4, 6, 9), arrangements (10)
- Joe Spivey – mandolin (10), violin (10)
- Jackie Street – bass (3, 4, 10)
- David Huff – drums (1–4, 6–10), percussion (1–4, 6–9), backing vocals (2, 6), shaker (10)
- Robert White Johnson – backing vocals (2, 6, 9)
- Kim Fleming – backing vocals (7, 8, 10)
- Vicki Hampton – backing vocals (7, 8, 10)
- Donna McElroy – backing vocals (7, 8, 10)
- Kari Schlitt – backing vocals (7)
- Micah Wilshire – backing vocals (9)
- Chris Rodriguez – backing vocals (10)
- Duawne Starling – backing vocals (10)
- Brandon Harris – children's vocals on "Wake the Dead"
- Taylor Harris – children's vocals on "Wake the Dead"
- Perry Heimermann – children's vocals on "Wake the Dead"
- Peyton Heimermann – children's vocals on "Wake the Dead"
- Jerry Wise – children's vocals on "Wake the Dead"
- Joy Wise – children's Vocals on "Wake the Dead"

Production

- Mark Heimermann – producer for Fun Attic Productions (1, 3–5)
- Dann Huff – producer (1–6, 9), engineer (2, 6, 9) at Dobb's Palace, Ashlyne Studio, Franklin, Tennessee, Fun Attic Studio, Franklin, Tennessee
- David Huff – producer (2, 6, 9), engineer (2, 6, 9)
- Greg Nelson – producer (7, 8, 10) at The Bennett House, Franklin, Tennessee, The Sound Kitchen, Franklin, Tennessee, Quad Studios Nashville, Tennessee, The Dugout, Nashville, Tennessee, Greg Nelson Studio Nashville, Tennessee
- James "JB" Baird – engineer at Ashlyne Studio, Franklin (1, 3–5)
- Joe Baldridge – engineer (1, 3–5)
- Penn Singleton – engineer (1, 3–5)
- Shane D. Wilson – engineer (1, 3–5)
- Jeff Balding – engineer (7, 8, 10)
- Steve Bishir – engineer (7, 8, 10)
- Keith Compton – engineer (7, 8, 10)
- Greg Parker – engineer (7, 8, 10), assistant engineer (7, 8, 10)
- Bill Deaton – engineer (7, 8, 10), mixing at Battery Studio, Nashville, Tennessee (1, 3–5, 7, 8, 10)
- Chris Davie – assistant engineer (7, 8, 10)
- Kevin Hipp – assistant engineer (7, 8, 10)
- Shawn McLean – assistant engineer (7, 8, 10)
- Greg Parker – assistant engineer (7, 8, 10)
- Martin Woodlee – assistant engineer (7, 8, 10)
- Ronnie Brookshire – mixing at Emerald Studios, Nashville, Tennessee (2, 6, 9)
- Carry Summers – mix assistant (1, 3–5, 7, 8, 10)
- Timothy Waters – mix assistant (2, 6, 9)
- Pete Martinez – mix assistant (7, 8, 10)
- Marty William – editing (1, 3–5)
- Paul James Heimermann – production manager (1, 3–5)
- Bubba Smith – executive producer
- Hank Williams – mastering at MasterMix, Nashville, Tennessee
- Diana Barnes –art direction
- Frank Chi – design
- Gabrielle Raumberger Design – design
- Ron Keith – photography
