= Home for the Holidays (Glen Campbell album) =

Studio album by Glen Campbell
- Released: September 1993
- Recorded: 1993
- Studio: Javelina (Nashville, Tennessee)
- Genre: Christmas
- Label: New Haven
- Producer: Glen Campbell, Ken Harding, Bergen White

Glen Campbell chronology
| Somebody Like That (1993) | Home for the Holidays (1993) | The Boy in Me (1994) |

Professional ratings
Review scores
| Source | Rating |
|---|---|
| Allmusic | 2.5/5 stars |

Home for the Holidays is the fifty-second album by American singer/guitarist Glen Campbell, released in 1993.

== Track listing ==
1. "The Christmas Song" (Mel Tormé, Robert Wells)
2. "Away in a Manger medley" (J. R. Murray, Bishop Phillips Brooks, Traditional)
  1. "Away in a Manger"
  2. "O Little Town of Bethlehem"
  3. "The First Noel"
3. "It Came Upon a Midnight Clear" (Edmund H. Sears, Richard S Willis)
4. "Little Drummer Boy" (K. K. Davis, Henry Onorati, Harry Simeone)
5. "What Child Is This?" (William Dix)
6. "I'll Be Home for Christmas" (Kim Gannon, Walter Kent, Buck Ram)
7. "Hark The Herald Angels Sing medley" (Rev. F. Oakeley, John H. Hopkins, Rev. C. Wesley)
  1. "O Come, O Come Emmanuel"
  2. "We Three Kings"
  3. "Hark the Herald Angels Sing"
8. "Silent Night" (Joseph Mohr, Franz Gruber)
9. "Have Yourself A Merry Little Christmas" (Ralph Blane, Hugh Martin)
10. "O Holy Night" (Adolphe Adams, John S. Dwight)

== Personnel ==
- Glen Campbell – vocals
- Shane Keister – keyboards, synthesizer
- Dann Huff – electric guitar
- Owen Hale – drums
- David Hungate – bass guitar
- John Willis – acoustic guitar
- Farrell Morris – percussion
- Cynthia Wyatt – harp
- Jim Horn – flute
- Bobby Taylor – oboe
- Tom McAninch – French horn
- Richard Steffen – trumpet
- Don Sheffield – trumpet
- Dan Oxley – trumpet
- Dennis Good – trombone
- Ernie Collins – bass trombone
- Toby Parrish – bagpipes
- Guest vocalist on "Away in a Manger medley" – Vince Gill
- Background vocals – Lura Foster, Jana King, Lisa Silver, Jon Ivey
- Choir – Sherry Huffman, Lisa Glasgow, Ellen Musick, Mark Ivy, Chris Willis
- Strings – Nashville String Machine

== Production ==
- Producer – Glen Campbell, Ken Harding, Bergen White
- Arranger – Bergen White
- Engineer – Warren Peterson
- Assistant engineers – Larry Jefferies, Robert Charles
- Production assistants- Debbie Harding, Brian Bush
- Photography – Sandra Gillard / Lightkeepers
- Recorded and mixed at Javelina Recording Studio, Nashville, TN
- Mastered by Hank Williams at Master Mix, Nashville, TN
