= Wings of Victory =

Studio album by Glen Campbell
- Released: June 15, 1992
- Recorded: 1992
- Studios: Eleven Eleven (Nashville, Tennessee)
- Genre: Contemporary Christian
- Label: New Haven
- Producers: Glen Campbell, Ken Harding, Geoff Thurman, Bergen White

Glen Campbell chronology
Rock-A-Doodle (1992)	Wings of Victory (1992)	Somebody Like That (1993)

Wings of Victory is the fiftieth album by American singer/guitarist Glen Campbell, released in 1992.

== Track listing ==
1. "Searchin' Love" (John R. Yowell) – (3:19)
2. "Shelter from the Storm" (Geoff Thurman, Becky Thurman) – (3:31)
3. "Second to None" (Geoff Thurman, Rob Grandi) – (3:51)
4. "The Eyes of Innocence" (Becky Thurman, Gary Lunn) – (4:45)
5. "Only One Life" (Jimmy Webb) – (4:08)
6. "Who's Minding the Garden" (Bruce Bouton, Alice Randall) – (3:27)
7. "On The Wings Of His Victory" (Bob Corbin) – (3:15)
8. "The Desert" (Gino Conti) – (3:34)
9. "Simple Things" (Geoff Thurman, Jamie Page) – (3:29)
10. "I Will Arise" (Arr. by Jimmy Webb) – (2:52)

== Personnel ==
- Glen Campbell – vocals, acoustic guitar
- Tom Hemby – acoustic guitars and electric guitars
- Mark Casstevens – acoustic guitar
- Dann Huff – electric guitar
- Gary Lunn – bass guitar
- Lonnie Wilson – drums
- Paul Leim – drums
- Shane Keister – keyboards, synthesizer
- Strings – The A Strings
- Background vocals – Geoff Thurman, Curtis Young, Bergen White, First Call, Boys Choir of Harlem

== Production ==
- Producers – Glen Campbell, Ken Harding, Geoff Thurman, Bergen White
- Arranged by Bergen White
- Recorded by Brent King at Eleven Eleven Sound, Nashville, TN
- Production Assistant – Debbie Harding
- Mixed by Ronnie Brookshire, Bryan Lenox, Patrick Kelly, Brent King
- Mastered by Hank Williams at Master Mix, Nashville, TN
- Overdubs recorded at Capstone Studio, House Of David, Studio at Moles End, Omni Sound Studio, Quad Studio, Nashville, TN, Clinton Recording Studio, New York, NY
- Photography – Mark Tucker
- Art direction – Larry Newlon/Powell Creative Group

== Charts ==
Chart (1993)	Peak position
US Top Contemporary Christian Albums (Billboard)	22

Singles – CCM charts (United States)

Year	Single	Adult Contemporary	Inspirational
1993	"The Eyes of Innocence"	25	—
1993	"Only One Life"	—	21
1993	"Searchin' Love"	13	6
1993	"I Will Arise"	—	14
