= A Million Lights (Michael W. Smith song) =

Single by Michael W. Smith

from the album A Million Lights
- Released: August 11, 2017
- Recorded: 2016–2017
- Genre: CEDM
- Length: 3:36
- Label: Rocketown Records
- Songwriter(s): Michael W. Smith; Kyle Lee; Paul Moak; Jonathan Jackson

Michael W. Smith singles chronology
"Sky Spills Over" (2015)	"A Million Lights" (2017)	"Surrounded (Fight My Battles)" (2018)

Music video
- "A Million Lights" on YouTube

A Million Lights is the lead single, released on August 11, 2017, from Michael W. Smith's album of the same name.

== Background ==
Smith told NewReleaseToday the story of the track: "I wrote the melody for this song, and it was the first song I started writing for this album. It was one of those songs I found that I forgot that I had written. It felt contagious. We sped it up 10 beats per minute, and at first I didn't like that, but as I thought about it I got used to it. We talked about what the song made me think of, and I said that it made me think about space. As a kid, I wanted to be an astronaut. I'm still fascinated by space. I take out my binoculars and look at the stars and the craters on the moon. I have a God experience just looking at the sky. It's been that way my whole life. We partnered that thought with 'all the stars are singing' and how God talks about creating the universe and all of space."

== Composition ==
A Million Lights is originally in the key of G Major, with a tempo of 110 beats per minute.

== Music video ==
The music video for the song premiered on VEVO October 24, 2017. It shows Smith inside a spacecraft getting ready for a walk on the outer part of the galaxy and staring at the stars in the sky in his spacesuit. The video has almost one million views on YouTube.

== Live performances ==
Smith performed the song on television for the first time on Good Morning America.

== Charts ==
Chart performance for "A Million Lights"
Chart (2017–18)	Peak position
US Adult Contemporary (Billboard)	24
US Christian Songs (Billboard)	44
US Christian Airplay (Billboard)	47

== Release history ==
Region	Date	Format	Label	Ref.
United States	August 11, 2017	Christian radio	Rocketown Records	
United States	August 11, 2017	Digital Download	Rocketown Records	
United States	May 14, 2018	Hot AC radio, Top 40 radio, Dance Airplay	MWS Group	
