= Glen Campbell Live! His Greatest Hits =

Live album by Glen Campbell
- Released: 1994
- Recorded: The Glen Campbell Goodtime Theatre, Branson, MO, August 9 and 10, 1994
- Genre: Country
- Label: Laserlight
- Producer: Ed Keeley

Glen Campbell chronology
The Boy in Me (1994)	Glen Campbell Live! His Greatest Hits (1994)	Christmas with Glen Campbell (1995)

Professional ratings
Review scores
Source	Rating
Allmusic	2/5 stars

Glen Campbell Live! His Greatest Hits is the fifty-fourth album by American singer/guitarist Glen Campbell, released in 1994.

== Track listing ==
1. "Gentle on My Mind" (John Hartford)
2. "By The Time I Get to Phoenix" (Jimmy Webb)
3. "Galveston" (Jimmy Webb)
4. "Kentucky Means Paradise" (Merle Travis)
5. "Wichita Lineman" (Jimmy Webb)
6. "Mansion in Branson" (Paul Overstreet, B. Braddock)
7. "Here in the Real World" (Alan Jackson, M. Irwin)
8. "Classical Gas" (Mason Williams)
9. "Rhinestone Cowboy" (Larry Weiss)
10. "Hits Medley":
  1. "It's Only Make Believe" (Conway Twitty, Jack Nance)
  2. "Turn Around, Look at Me" (Jerry Capehart, Glen Campbell)
  3. "Where's The Playground Suzie" (Jimmy Webb)
  4. "Hey Little One" (Dorsey Burnette, Barry DeVorzon)
  5. "Country Boy (You Got Your Feet in LA)" (Dennis Lambert, Brian Potter)
  6. "Mary in the Morning" (J. Cymbal, Michael Rashkow)
  7. "Dreams of the Everyday Housewife" (Chris Gantry)
  8. "Sunflower" (Neil Diamond)
11. "Let It Be Me" (Mann Curtis, Gilbert Bécaud) duet with Debby Campbell
12. "No More Night" (W. Harrah)
13. "Southern Nights" (Allen Toussaint)

== Personnel ==
- Glen Campbell – vocals, acoustic guitar, electric guitar
- Debby Campbell – vocals
- Gary Bruzesse – vocals, drums
- Jeff Dayton – vocals, acoustic guitar, electric guitar
- Noel Kirkland – vocals, fiddle, banjo, acoustic guitar, keyboards
- T.J. Kuenster – musical director, vocals, keyboards
- Kenny Skaggs – vocals, acoustic guitar, steel guitar, dobro, mandolin
- Russ Skaggs – vocals, bass guitar

== Production ==
- Producer – Ed Keeley
- Recording Engineers (studio) – Chuck Haines, David Hieronymus
- Recording engineers (mobile) – Chuck Haines, D. C. Tong
- Cover – Michael Matousek/Matousek Design
- Photography – Sandra Gillard/Lightkeepers
- Publicity – Sandy Brokaw
- Mixed, digitally edited and mastered by Chuck Haines, Ed Keeley, David Hieronymus, Chris Milfred at Chelsea Studio, Nashville, TN
- Theatre audio staff – Bill Maclay, Michael Spence, Jeff Wyatt
