= Hymns II (Michael W. Smith album) =

Hymns II – Shine on Us

Studio album by Michael W. Smith
- Released: January 29, 2016
- Producer: Michael W. Smith, Kyle Lee, Jim Daneker

Michael W. Smith chronology
The Spirit of Christmas (2014)	Hymns II – Shine on Us (2016)	A Million Lights (2018)

Hymns II – Shine on Us is a studio album by Christian recording artist Michael W. Smith. It was released exclusively at Cracker Barrel Old Country Store on January 29, 2016. This is Smith's second hymns album and second release with Cracker Barrel. In the US the album is also available digitally on iTunes and Amazon.

== Critical reception ==
Hymns II – Shine on Us was met with positive reviews. Caitlin Lassiter of New Release Today rated the album with four stars out of five, stating that "With Hymns II: Shine On Us, Michael W. Smith once again proves why he's one of the greats in this industry as he takes timeless favorites and adds his unique touch--breathing incredible creative energy into them to make them feel revived." Matt Conner of CCM Magazine gave the album three-and-a-half stars out of five. Gary Durban at Worship Leader gave the album four stars out of five.

== Commercial performance ==
The album debuted at No. 172 on Billboard 200 and No. 3 on Billboard Top Christian Albums with approximately 4000 copies sold in its first week of release. This album marks Smith's 29th Top 10 album.

== Track listing ==
No.	Title	Writer(s)	Length
1.	"Down to the River to Pray"		3:16
2.	"I Need Thee"	Annie Sherwood Hawks, Robert Lowry	4:18
3.	"Jesus, Only Jesus"	Chris Tomlin, Christy Nockels, Kristian Stanfill, Matt Redman, Nathan Nockels, Tony Wood	4:09
4.	"Turn Your Eyes Upon Jesus"	Helen Howarth Lemmel	4:36
5.	"I'll Fly Away"	Albert E. Brumley	2:21
6.	"His Eye Is on the Sparrow"	Civilla D. Martin, Charles H. Gabriel	4:12
7.	"I Don't Know Why (Jesus Loves Me)"	Andrae Crouch	3:19
8.	"Shine on Us"	Michael W. Smith, Debbie Smith	3:59
9.	"Nearer My God to Thee"	Lowell Mason, Sarah Fuller, Flower Adams	5:13
10.	"Untitled Hymn (Come to Jesus)"	Chris Rice	3:44
11.	"I'd Rather Have Jesus"	Rhea F. Miller	4:06
12.	"O Sacred Head, Now Wounded"	Paul Gerhardt, Bernard of Clairvaux, Hans Leo Hassler, James Waddell Alexander	4:34
13.	"Be Still My Soul"	Kathrina Amalia Dorothea von Schlegel, Jane Laurie Borthwick, Jean Sibelius	3:38
14.	"Great Is The Lord"	Michael W. Smith, Debbie Smith	2:59
15.	"A Mighty Fortress Is Our God"	Martin Luther, Frederic H. Hedge	3:53
16.	"America the Beautiful (O Beautiful for Spacious Skies)"	Katharine Lee Bates, Samuel A. Ward	3:31
Total length:			62:48

== Charts ==
Chart (2016)	Peak position
US Billboard 200	172
US Christian Albums (Billboard)	3
US Independent Albums (Billboard)	3
