= Christmas (Michael W. Smith album) =

Studio album by Michael W. Smith
- Released: September 1, 1989
- Recorded: 1989
- Studio: War Memorial Auditorium and Digital Recorders (Nashville, Tennessee); Deer Valley Studio (Franklin, Tennessee); Martin Sound (Alhambra, California); Sigma Sound Studios (Philadelphia, Pennsylvania)
- Genre: Christmas, CCM
- Length: 37:03
- Label: Reunion
- Producer: Michael W. Smith; Ronn Huff

Michael W. Smith chronology
| i 2 (EYE) (1988) | Christmas (1989) | Go West Young Man (1990) |

Professional ratings
Review scores
| Source | Rating |
|---|---|
| AllMusic | 3/5 stars |
| Jesus Freak Hideout | 4/5 stars |

Christmas is a 1989 Michael W. Smith studio album and Smith's first Christmas album.

== Track listing ==
| No. | Title | Writer(s) | Length |
|---|---|---|---|
| 1. | "Overture"/"O Come All Ye Faithful" | John Francis Wade | 5:38 |
| 2. | "Lux Venit" | Beverly Darnall, Amy Grant, M. Smith | 3:28 |
| 3. | "Anthem for Christmas" | Gloria Gaither, M. Smith | 3:11 |
| 4. | "First Snowfall" | M. Smith | 2:44 |
| 5. | "Christ the Messiah" | Elizabeth L. Jones, M. Smith, Deborah D. Smith | 3:59 |
| 6. | "No Eye Had Seen" | Amy Grant, M. Smith | 2:53 |
| 7. | "All Is Well" | Wayne Kirkpatrick, M. Smith | 4:08 |
| 8. | "Memoirs: A Trilogy" | M. Smith, John Mason Neale, Felix Mendelssohn | 4:28 |
| 9. | "Gloria" | M. Smith, traditional | 5:03 |
| 10. | "Silent Night" | Franz Xaver Gruber, Joseph Mohr | 1:33 |

== Personnel ==
- Michael W. Smith – vocals, acoustic piano, keyboards, percussion, track arrangements
- Dann Huff (uncredited) – guitar (2, 8, 9)
- Paul Leim – drums (9)
- Bryan Lenox – percussion
- Ronn Huff – orchestral arrangements and conductor, choral arrangements, track arrangements (1)
- Carl Gorodetzky – concertmaster, contractor
- The Nashville String Machine – orchestra
- The Nashville Festival Orchestra – orchestra
- Mary Bates – backing vocals
- Beverly Darnall – backing vocals
- Ellen Musick – backing vocals
- Leah Taylor – backing vocals
- Cathedral Choir – adult choir
- Fred Bock – music director for Cathedral Choir
- The American Boychoir – boychoir
- James Litton – choir conductor for The American Boychoir
- Amy Grant – vocal soloist (6)
- Nathan Wadley – vocal soloist (7)

== Production ==
- Michael Blanton – executive producer
- Terry Hemmings – executive producer
- Michael W. Smith – producer
- Ronn Huff – producer
- Mark Laycock – orchestra and choir producer
- Bill Whittington – engineer, mixing
- Brent King – orchestra engineer, additional engineer
- Dan Garcia – additional engineer
- Scott MacMinn – additional engineer
- Steve Charles – assistant engineer
- Joe Kraus – assistant engineer
- Bryan Lenox – assistant engineer
- Rick Horton – editing at Digital Associates (Nashville, Tennessee)
- Ron Lewter – mastering at The Mastering Lab (Los Angeles, California)
- Elizabeth Jones – production assistant
- D.L. Rhodes – cover coordinator
- Buddy Jackson – art direction, design, cover illustration
- Mark Tucker – photography
- Mary Beth Felts – stylist

== "All Is Well" ==
"All Is Well" features soloist Nathan Wadley. The song is also included in his compilation set The Wonder Years (1993). In 2014, Smith remade the song for his 2014 holiday album The Spirit of Christmas, this time sharing the vocals with country artist Carrie Underwood. Christian girl group Point of Grace recorded a version for their 2005 album Winter Wonderland. Clay Aiken recorded a cover version in 2006 for his Christmas EP All Is Well.

== Chart performance ==
| Chart (1989) | Peak position |
|---|---|
| US Top Christian Albums (Billboard) | 3 |
