= Surrounded (Michael W. Smith album) =

Live album by Michael W. Smith
- Released: February 23, 2018
- Recorded: November 2, 2017
- Genre: Contemporary Christian music, worship
- Label: Rocketown
- Producer: Kyle Lee, Michael W. Smith

Michael W. Smith chronology
A Million Lights (2018)	Surrounded (2018)	Awaken: The Surrounded Experience (2019)

Surrounded is a live worship album by Christian recording artist Michael W. Smith. It was released on February 23, 2018 through Rocketown Records and The Fuel Music.

== Track listing ==
No.	Title	Writer(s)	Length
1.	"Your House"	Kyle Lee, Michael W. Smith	4:57
2.	"Light To You"	Thad Cockrell, Lee, MWS	6:05
3.	"King of My Heart"	John Mark McMillan, Sarah McMillan	4:22
4.	"Reckless Love"	Caleb Culver, Cory Asbury, Ran Jackson	8:53
5.	"Here I Bow"	Brian Johnson, Jenn Johnson, Jason Ingram, Jonas Myrin, Matt Redman	4:47
6.	"Miracles"	Chris Quilala, Joshua Silverberg, Dustin Smith, Stuart Garrard	8:56
7.	"Do It Again"	Redman, Chris Brown, Matt Brock, Steven Furtick	6:09
8.	"Surrounded (Fight My Battles)"	Elyssa Smith	5:01
9.	"Build My Life"	Redman, Pat Barrett, Kirby Kaple, Brett Younker, Karl Martin	7:12
10.	"Washed Away"	Michael Farren, MWS	6:23
11.	"Great Are You Lord"	Ingram, David Leonard, Leslie Jordan	4:40
12.	"Light To You (Reprise)"	Cockrell, Lee, MWS	3:17

== Personnel ==
Musicians

- Michael W. Smith – lead vocals, Hammond B3 organ, additional keys and programming
- Jim Daneker – keys and programming
- Kyle Lee – additional keys and programming, acoustic guitars
- Josh Moore – additional keys and programming
- David Ramirez – additional keys and programming
- Stuart Garrard – electric guitar
- James Duke – electric guitar
- Otto Price – bass
- Paul Mabury – drums, percussion

Background vocals

- Nia Allen
- Brittany Batson
- Eden DeJesus
- David Dennis
- Jamia Ellis
- Alex Gomez
- Mark Gutierrez (also additional lead vocals on "Miracles")
- Martrell Harris
- Ana Hudgins
- Tammy Jensen
- Chris Kim
- Jenna Long
- Josh Lopez
- Calvin Nowell (also additional lead vocals on "Great Are You Lord")
- Michelle Schorr
- Debi Selby
- Ilia Share
- Cedric Williams
- David Wise

== Production ==
- Kyle Lee – producer, mixing
- Michael W. Smith – co-producer, executive producer
- Chaz Corzine – executive producer
- Greg Ham – executive producer
- Derek Spirk – associate executive producer
- Danny Duncan – engineer, recording for Vanguard Recording
- Rob Williams – assistant recording
- Austin Berger – assistant recording
- Willie Flynn – assistant recording
- Daniel Johnston – assistant recording
- Conrad Johnson – additional engineering
- Foster Farrell – additional engineering
- The Factory (Franklin, Tennessee) – recording location
- The Void (Franklin, Tennessee) – mixing location
- Bob Boyd – mastering at Ambient Digital (Houston, Texas)
- Brandon Chesbro – photography
- Brody Harper – creative director
- Nick DePartee – art, design
- Keelin Crew – A&R administration
- The MWS Group – management

== Accolades ==
Awards
Year	Organization	Award	Result
2019	GMA Dove Awards	Worship Song of the Year	Nominated
2019	Grammy Awards	Best Contemporary Christian Music Album	Nominated

== Chart performance ==
Chart performance for Surrounded
Chart (2018)	Peak position
US Billboard 200	188
US Christian Albums (Billboard)	2
US Independent Albums (Billboard)	8

Singles
Year	Single	Peak chart positions
Year	Single	US Christ.
2018	"Surrounded (Fight My Battles)"	36
