= Christmas with Glen Campbell (1995 album) =

Studio album by Glen Campbell
- Released: 19 September 1995
- Recorded: 1995, Glen Campbell Goodtime Theatre and Caravell Recording Studio, Branson, MO
- Genres: Country, christmas music
- Length: 28:34
- Label: Laserlight
- Producer: T.J. Kuenster

Glen Campbell chronology
Glen Campbell Live! His Greatest Hits (1994)	Christmas with Glen Campbell (1995)	A Glen Campbell Christmas (1998)

Christmas with Glen Campbell is the fifty-fifth album by American singer/guitarist Glen Campbell, released in 1995 (see 1995 in music).

== Track listing ==
1. "Santa Claus Is Coming to Town" (J. Fred Coots, Haven Gillespie) – 2:14
2. "Winter Wonderland" (Felix Bernard, Dick Smith) – 2:45
3. "White Christmas" (Irving Berlin) – 2:46
4. "Sleigh Ride" (Leroy Anderson, Mitchell Parish) – 2:51
5. "God Rest Ye Merry Gentlemen" (arr. by T. J. Kuenster) – 1:58
6. "Frosty the Snowman" (S. Nelson, J. Rollins) – 2:38
7. "Jingle Bell Rock" (Joe Beal, Jim Boothe) – 1:51
8. "Here Comes Santa Claus" (Gene Autry, Oakley Haldeman) – 1:36
9. "Let It Snow! Let It Snow! Let It Snow!" (Sammy Cahn, Jule Styne) – 2:22
10. "Do You Hear What I Hear?" (Noël Regney, Gloria Shayne Baker) – 3:52
11. "I Saw Three Ships" (arr. by T. J. Kuenster) – 3:41
12. Source for tracks, personnel and production crew:

== Personnel ==
- Glen Campbell – vocals, acoustic guitar, electric guitar, bagpipes
- T.J. Kuenster – Kurzweil digital grand piano, backing vocals
- Jeff Dayton – electric guitar, acoustic guitar, backing vocals
- Gary Bruzzese – drums, percussion, backing vocals
- Ken Skaggs – mandolin, steel guitar
- Russell Skaggs – bass guitar
- Noel Kirkland – electric guitar
- Ron Rutowski – fiddle, banjo

== Production ==
- Producer – T.J. Kuenster
- Engineer/co-producer – Jeff Wyatt
- Co-engineer – Mike Frazier
- Production Coordinator – Bill Maclay
- Cover – Lotta Lannerheim
- Photo – Sandra Ann Gillard
- Digitally recorded and mixed at the Glen Campbell Goodtime Theatre and Caravell Recording Studio, Branson, MO
- Digitally mastered by Paul Tavenner at Blue Nile Recording Studio, Burbank, CA
