= You Won't Let Go =

Single by Michael W. Smith

from the album Sovereign
- Released: February 4, 2014
- Genre: CCM; worship
- Length: 3:57
- Label: Sparrow; Capitol
- Songwriters: Michael W. Smith; Mia Fieldes; Seth Mosley
- Producer: Christopher Stevens

Michael W. Smith singles chronology
"I'll Wait For You" (2011)	"You Won't Let Go" (2014)	"Sovereign Over Us" (2014)

"You Won't Let Go" is the lead single, released on February 4, 2014, from Michael W. Smith's album, Sovereign.

== Background ==
It was released to the iTunes Store on February 4, 2014 and opened at No. 13 on the Billboard Hot Christian Songs chart.

== Live performances ==
Smith performed the song for the first time at the contemporary Christian music radio programming service K-LOVE in early January.

== Charts ==
Chart performance for "You Won't Let Go"
Chart (2014)	Peak position
US Hot Christian Songs (Billboard)	13
US Christian Airplay (Billboard)	16
US Christian AC (Billboard)	21
