= Place in This World =

1991 single by Michael W. Smith

Single by Michael W. Smith

from the album Go West Young Man
- Released: March 1991
- Recorded: 1990
- Studio: BMG Studio, New York City
- Genre: Pop
- Length: 4:01
- Label: Reunion
- Songwriters: Amy Grant; Michael W. Smith; Wayne Kirkpatrick
- Producers: Wayne Kirkpatrick; Bryan Lenox; Michael W. Smith

Michael W. Smith singles chronology
"Go West Young Man" (1990)	"Place in This World" (1991)	"How Long Will Be Too Long" (1991)

Music video
- "Place in this World" on YouTube

"Place in This World" is a song by American musician Michael W. Smith, released in March 1991, by Reunion Records, as the second single from his sixth album, Go West Young Man (1990). The song became his biggest success in mainstream music when it hit No. 6 on the US Billboard Hot 100. It lasted 21 weeks on the overall chart.

== Background ==
"Place in This World" was released in 1991, as the second single from his sixth studio album Go West Young Man. This record was his first attempt at mainstream success, which successfully crossed over the single. The message of the song has proved to be meaningful to a lot of people. Smith was asked if there are any stories that have stuck with him. He responded, "Well, the one story I remember vividly, I could still go back to reading the letter, was some young girl, I think she was 18 or 19 years old, and had a horrific childhood in terms of abuse and that sort of thing. And she was suicidal. She gave me this whole story in a two page letter. She was driving down the freeway and listening to a pop radio station and heard 'Place in This World' and pulled over and began to weep. And had this encounter with God on the side of the interstate. And her life forever changed. And that's the one that I'll never forget. There's been plenty of people talk about 'A Place in This World' but that's the one letter that I'll never forget."

== Composition ==
The song is played in B major, mod. to C at 72 beats per minute.

== Personnel ==
- Michael W. Smith — lead vocals
- Mike Lawler — additional keyboards
- Bryan Lenox — percussion, drums, keyboard programming
- Trace Scarborough — keyboard programming
- Matt Pierson — synth bass
- Dann Huff — guitar
- Terry McMillan – percussion
- Mark Douthit — saxophone
- Barry Green — trombone
- Mike Haynes — trumpet
- Chris McDonald — horn arrangements
- The Nashville String Machine — strings
- Ronn Huff — string arrangements and conductor
- Carl Gorodetzsky — concertmaster and contractor

== Charts ==
=== Weekly charts ===
Chart (1991)	Peak position
Australia (ARIA)	184
Canada Top Singles (RPM)	25
Canada Adult Contemporary (RPM)	8
US Billboard Hot 100	6
US Adult Contemporary (Billboard)	5
US Christian AC (Billboard)	1
US Cash Box Top 100	3

Chart (2025)	Peak position
US Christian AC (Billboard)	9
US Christian Airplay (Billboard)	9
US Hot Christian Songs (Billboard)	11

=== Year-end charts ===
Chart (1991)	Position
US Billboard Hot 100	77
US Adult Contemporary (Billboard)	26
US Cash Box Top 100	42

Chart (2025)	Position
US Hot Christian Songs (Billboard)	42

== Accolades ==
Year	Organization	Category	Result	Ref.
1992	Dove Awards	Song of the Year	Won	
