= Change Your World =

Studio album by Michael W. Smith
- Released: September 1, 1992
- Recorded: 1992
- Studios: Deer Valley and Classic Recording Studio (Franklin, Tennessee); The Benson Company, Javelina Recording Studios, The Master's Touch, Skylab Recording, Soundshop Recording, OmniSound, Quad Studios, Sixteenth Avenue Sound and Emerald Sound (Nashville, Tennessee); Devonshire Sound Studios (North Hollywood, California); Ground Control (Santa Monica, California)
- Genre: Contemporary Christian music
- Length: 50:46
- Labels: Reunion, Geffen
- Producers: Mark Heimermann; Michael W. Smith; Scott MacLeod; Trace Scarborough; Wayne Kirkpatrick

Michael W. Smith chronology
Go West Young Man (1990)	Change Your World (1992)	The Wonder Years (1993)

Professional ratings
Review scores
Source	Rating
AllMusic	4.5/5 stars

Change Your World is a 1992 studio album by Contemporary Christian music artist Michael W. Smith released by Reunion Records.

== Track listing ==
No.	Title	Writer(s)	Length
1.	"Picture Perfect"	Michael W. Smith, Wayne Kirkpatrick	4:00
2.	"Love One Another"	M. Smith, Kirkpatrick	4:55
3.	"I Will Be Here for You"	M. Smith, Diane Warren	4:35
4.	"Color Blind"	M. Smith, Kirkpatrick, Dann Huff	5:17
5.	"Somewhere Somehow (w/ Amy Grant)"	M. Smith, Kirkpatrick, Amy Grant, David Foster	4:17
6.	"Cross of Gold"	M. Smith, Kirkpatrick	4:36
7.	"Out of This World"	M. Smith, Grant, Beverly Darnall, Deborah D. Smith	4:25
8.	"Somebody Love Me"	M. Smith, Kirkpatrick	4:00
9.	"Give It Away"	M. Smith, Kirkpatrick, Grant	5:08
10.	"I Wanna Tell the World"	M. Smith, Mark Heimermann, Toby McKeehan	4:29
11.	"Friends (Note: "Friends" first appeared on Smith's debut album, Michael W. Smith Project.)"	M. Smith, D. Smith	4:40

== Personnel ==
- Michael W. Smith – lead vocals, keyboards (1–3, 5, 6, 8, 9, 11), Fender Rhodes (4), synthesizer (7), acoustic piano (7)
- Mark Heimmerman – additional keyboards (1, 2, 5, 6, 8, 9), drum programming (1, 4, 6, 10), backing vocals (2, 3, 8–11), keyboards (10)
- Brian Tankersley – additional programming (1, 6), drum programming (9)
- Mike Lawler – additional keyboards (2, 3, 9, 10)
- Phil Madeira – Hammond B3 organ (4, 6, 9)
- Scott McLeod – synthesizer (7), synth bass (7), drum programming (7)
- Trace Scarborough – synthesizer (7), synth bass (7), drum programming (7)
- Dann Huff – guitar (1, 3, 4, 6, 7, 9, 11)
- George Cocchini – guitar (1, 10)
- Jerry McPherson – guitar (2, 5, 7–9)
- Jackie Street – bass (1, 6–8, 10)
- Jimmie Lee Sloas – bass (2, 9)
- Gary Lunn – bass (3, 5, 11)
- Tommy Sims – bass (4)
- Joe Houge – drum programming (2)
- Mark Hammond – drum programming (3, 11)
- Steve Brewster – drums (4, 5, 8)
- Toby McKeehan – drum programming (4, 10), vocal flavor (10)
- Terry McMillan – percussion (1, 3, 6, 9, 11)
- Dan Higgins – saxophones (4)
- Barry Green – trombone (3, 6)
- Chris McDonald – trombone (3, 6), horn arrangements (3, 6)
- Bill Reichenbach, Jr. – trombone (4)
- Mike Haynes – trumpet (3, 6)
- George Tidwell – trumpet (3, 6)
- Gary Grant – trumpet (4)
- Jerry Hey – trumpet (4), horn arrangements (4)
- The Nashville String Machine – strings (3, 5, 6, 8, 9, 11)
- Ronn Huff – string arrangements and conductor (3, 5, 6, 8, 9, 11)
- Michael Black – backing vocals (1–4, 7–10)
- Vicki Hampton – backing vocals (1, 2)
- Donna McElroy – backing vocals (1, 2, 7, 10)
- Chris Rodriguez – backing vocals (1, 2, 4, 7, 11)
- Chris Harris – backing vocals (2, 3, 8–11),
- Wayne Kirkpatrick – backing vocals (2, 3, 11)
- Chris Willis – backing vocals (4)
- The Music City Mass Choir – choir (4)
- Amy Grant – lead vocals (5)
- Greg Barnhill – backing vocals (6)
- Bob Carlisle – backing vocals (6)
- Joey Jelf – backing vocals (6)
- Carl Lucero – backing vocals (7)
- Angelo Petrucci – backing vocals (7)
- Veronica Petrucci – backing vocals (7)
- Lisa Bevill – backing vocals (9)
- Ricky D – backing vocals (9)
- Jan Harris – backing vocals (9)
- Bonnie Keen – backing vocals (9)
- Kevin Max Smith – backing vocals (9)
- Kim Smith – backing vocals (9)
- Michael Tait – backing vocals (9)
- The Christ Church Choir – choir (9)

== Production ==
- Executive Producer – Michael Blanton
- Producers – Mark Heimmerman and Michael W. Smith
- John Kalodner – John Kalodner
- Vocal Production – Wayne Kirkpatrick
- Additional production on "Out of This World" – Trace Scarborough and Scott MacLeod
- Engineered by James "JB" Baird
- Additional Engineers – Keith Compton, Lynn Fuston, Humberto Gatica, Patrick Kelly, Brent King, Bryan Lenox, Alejandro Rodriguez, Tony Sheppard, Penn Singleton, Brian Tankersley and Bill Warner.
- Assistant Engineers – Jeff Baggett, Mark Capps, David Hall, Keith Kregsi, David Murphy, Greg Parker, Darren Smith, Aaron Swihart and Martin Woodlee.
- Strings recorded by JB and Brent King
- Horns on "Color Blind" recorded by Humberto Gatica
- Mixed by Humberto Gatica
- Mix Assistant – Alejandro Rodriguez
- Mastered by Greg Fulginiti at Masterdisk (New York, NY).
- Mastering Supervisor – David Donnelly
- Creative Direction – Robin Sloane
- Art Direction – Janet Wolsborn
- Photography – Timothy White
- Photography Coordination – Sofie Howard

== Chart performance ==
Chart (1992)	Peak position
US Billboard 200	86
US Top Christian Albums (Billboard)	1
