= I 2 (EYE) =

i 2 (EYE)

Studio album by Michael W. Smith
- Released: September 1, 1988
- Recorded: 1988
- Studios: The Bennett House, Deer Valley Studio and The Castle (Franklin, Tennessee); OmniSound, Sixteenth Avenue Sound and Masterfonics (Nashville, Tennessee)
- Genre: Christian rock
- Length: 56:02
- Label: Reunion
- Producers: Michael W. Smith; Wayne Kirkpatrick

Michael W. Smith chronology
The Live Set (1987)	i 2 (EYE) (1988)	Christmas (1989)

Professional ratings
Review scores
Source	Rating
AllMusic	4.5/5 stars
Jesus Freak Hideout	4/5 stars

i 2 (EYE) is Michael W. Smith's fifth album overall and his second album to be certified gold. Smith collaborated again with lyricist Wayne Kirkpatrick, and produced music videos for the songs "Secret Ambition" and "I Miss the Way." The album peaked at No. 1 on the Top Contemporary Christian charts.

== Track listing ==
All songs written by Michael W. Smith and Wayne Kirkpatrick except where noted.

No.	Title	Writer(s)	Length
1.	"Hand of Providence"		4:33
2.	"Secret Ambition"	Smith, Kirkpatrick, Amy Grant	6:26
3.	"On the Other Side"		3:40
4.	"All You're Missin is a Heartache"		5:39
5.	"I Miss the Way"		4:35
6.	"Live and Learn"		6:17
7.	"I Hear Leesha"		5:26
8.	"Help You Find Your Way"	Smith, Kirkpatrick, Chris Rodriguez	5:28
9.	"Ashton"	Smith	3:17
10.	"The Throne"	Smith, Gary Moore	6:49
11.	"Pray for Me"		3:52

== Personnel ==
Musicians

- Michael W. Smith – keyboards, lead vocals (1–8, 10, 11), backing vocals (2, 3, 6, 7, 10), horn arrangements (6), drum programming (9)
- Dann Huff – guitars (1–8)
- Chris Rodriguez – guitars (1, 3, 5, 6, 8), backing vocals (4, 6, 8, 11)
- Jerry McPherson – guitars (2, 4, 9, 10), acoustic guitar (7)
- Tom Hemby – guitars (6, 8, 10, 11), bass (9, 11)
- Mark O'Connor – mandolins (9), fiddles (9)
- Billy Sprague – acoustic guitar (11)
- Mike Brignardello – bass (1–5, 7, 8)
- Tommy Sims – bass (6)
- Gary Lunn – bass (10)
- Paul Leim – drums (1–4, 6–8, 10)
- Mark Hammond – drum programming (11)
- Terry McMillan – percussion (1, 3, 5, 7, 8), harmonica (1)
- Bob Mason – cello (5)
- George Binkley – violin (5)
- John Borg – violin (5)
- Carl Gorodetzsky – violin (5)
- Ronn Huff – string arrangements (5)
- Mark Douthit – horns (6), horn arrangements (6)
- Barry Green – horns (6), horn arrangements (6)
- Mike Haynes – horns (6), horn arrangements (6)
- Wayne Kirkpatrick – backing vocals (1–8, 10), acoustic guitar (3), drum programming (9)
- Chris Harris – backing vocals (1, 2, 4, 5, 8, 10), recitation (6)
- Mark Heimmerman – backing vocals (2, 5)
- Oz Fox – backing vocals (4)
- Billy Simon – backing vocals (4)
- Michael Sweet – backing vocals (4)

Choir on "The Throne"

- Chris Harris
- Jan Harris
- Amy Heimmerman
- Mark Heimmerman
- Angel Palacastro
- Chris Rodriguez
- Lisa Rodriguez
- Kim Smith
- Don Wise

Children's choir on "The Throne"

- Anna Kristen Caker
- Benji Cowart
- Jeremy Cowart
- Dana Dawson
- Daniel Dorris
- Heather Holland
- Shannon Love
- Sara Yarborough
- Kathie Hill – children's choir director

Production

- Michael Blanton – executive producer
- Jeff Moseley – executive producer
- Michael W. Smith – producer
- Wayne Kirkpatrick – producer
- Bill Whittington – engineer, mixing
- Lynn Fuston – additional engineer
- Steve Bishir – assistant engineer
- John Bouchillon – assistant engineer
- Mike Clute – assistant engineer
- Brian Hardin – assistant engineer
- Mark Nevers – assistant engineer
- Dave Parker – assistant engineer
- Carry Summers – assistant engineer
- Ken Love – editing
- Hank Williams – mastering at MasterMix (Nashville, Tennessee)
- Jackson Design Nashville – design
- Eika Aoshima – photography
- Jonathan Scow-Cloutier – styling
- Wendy Osmundson – grooming

== Chart performance ==
=== Weekly charts ===
Chart (1988)	Peak position
US Top Christian Albums (Billboard)	1

== Certifications ==
Country	Sales	Certifications
United States (RIAA)	500,000	Gold
