= Sovereign (album) =

Studio album by Michael W. Smith
- Released: May 13, 2014
- Recorded: January 2014
- Studios: Brown Owl Studios, Nashville, Tennessee; FabMusic, Franklin, Tennessee; Full Circle Music, Franklin, Tennessee; redredstudio, Nashville, Tennessee; The Manor, Franklin, Tennessee; The Soundhouse, Redding, California
- Genres: CCM, worship
- Length: 56:38
- Label: Capitol/Sparrow
- Producers: Jeremy Edwardson; Seth Mosley; Christopher Stevens; Joshua Silverberg

Michael W. Smith chronology
Hymns (2014)	Sovereign (2014)	The Spirit of Christmas (2014)

Singles from Sovereign
- 1. "You Won't Let Go" Released: February 4, 2014; 2. "Sovereign Over Us" Released: 2014; 3. "Sky Spills Over" Released: February 2, 2015

Sovereign is an album by Christian recording artist Michael W. Smith released on May 13, 2014 through Capitol Records. The album debuted at No. 10 on the Billboard 200 and at No. 1 on the Christian Albums chart.

The album's first single, "You Won't Let Go", was released digitally on February 4, 2014 and it opened at No. 13 on the Billboard Hot Christian Songs chart. Christian singer Kari Jobe is featured on one of the songs on the album.

== Critical reception ==
Professional ratings
Review scores
Source	Rating
AllMusic	3.5/5 stars
CCM Magazine	4/5 stars
CM Addict	5/5 stars
Cross Rhythms	9/10 squares
Indie Vision Music	4/5 stars
Jesus Freak Hideout	3/5 stars
Louder Than the Music	4.5/5 stars
New Release Tuesday	4/5 stars
The Phantom Tollbooth	4/5 stars

Sovereign met with generally positive reception from music critics. At CCM Magazine, Grace S. Aspinwall rated the album four stars out of five, remarking how "Over all, the record shows Smith returning to what he does best [...] ushering listeners into worship", and that "Time has granted a lovely depth to his vocal, which is surrounded by smart, fresh arrangements." Sarah Fine of New Release Tuesday rated the album four stars out of five, observing how "Sovereign is a solid musical representation of Michael W. Smith's growth as an artist in the last decade." At Indie Vision Music, Jonathan Andre rated the album four stars out of five, calling this "a poignant, powerful and prolific" release. Matt Collar of AllMusic rated the album three-and-a-half stars out of five, indicating how "Smith has crafted an earnest and heartfelt recording inspired by his deep faith." At Cross Rhythms, Tim Holden rated the album nine out of ten squares, commenting how "the Michael touch shines through and the quality and passion make this one of the best worship albums for quite a while - very easy to both listen to and worship along with."

Jono Davies of Louder Than the Music rated the album four-and-a-half stars out of five, remarking how Smith "sounding as fresh as he ever has" on this release. At Christian Music Review, Laura Chambers rated the album a 4.9 out of five, writing how the release proves Smith "still has the same desire to write and sing for the glory of God and his audience's good." Joshua Andre of Christian Music Zine rated the album 4.75 out of five, declaring that the release "is his most cohesive and strongest studio effort." At CM Addict, Brianne Bellomy rated the album a perfect five stars, observing how "For old fans, 'Smitty' is truly working at his best", and "For new fans, welcome to music for your soul."

At The Phantom Tollbooth, Michael Dalton rated the album four tocks out of five, writing how the release is Smith's "finest effort in this category" because "These songs are straightforward with restrained artistry, giving them broad appeal." Jim Wilkerson of The Christian Music Review Blog rated the album four stars out of five, saying that "There really isn't a song that I don't like on this album, but I have to say I still wanted to hear more from Michael." At Jesus Freak Hideout, Mark Rice rated the album three stars out of five, cautioning that "The overall result is an album that caters far too much to the mainstream CCM contemporary worship crowd with too little creative appeal outside those confines."

== Awards and accolades ==
This album was No. 11 on the Worship Leader's Top 20 Albums of 2014 list.

The song, "All Arise", was No. 15 on the Worship Leader's Top 20 Songs of 2014 list.

== Commercial performance ==
For the Billboard charting week of May 31, 2014, Sovereign debuted at No. 10 on the Billboard 200, and it is the highest-charting album in his career. In addition, the album topped the Christian Albums chart, and it reached No. 25 on Digital Albums chart. The album sold slightly less than 16,000 copies in its first week.

== Track listing ==
Standard edition
No.	Title	Writer(s)	Length
1.	"You Won't Let Go"	Michael W. Smith, Mia Fieldes, Seth Mosley	3:59
2.	"Heaven Come Down"	Smith, Christopher Stevens	3:50
3.	"Miracle"	Smith, Kyle Lee, Mosley	4:19
4.	"Sky Spills Over"	Smith, Ryan Smith, Stevens	4:04
5.	"All Arise"	Smith, Jason Ingram	4:40
6.	"You Are the Fire"	Michael Farren, Kyle Lee	4:29
7.	"Christ Be All Around Me"	Leslie Jordan, David Leonard, Jack Mooring, Leeland Dayton Mooring	5:24
8.	"Sovereign Over Us"	Bryan Brown, Aaron Keyes, J. Mooring	5:54
9.	"Hide Myself"	Smith, Fieldes, Mosley	4:22
10.	"The Same Power"	Ben Cantelon, Nick Herbert	4:25
11.	"I Lay Me Down"	Smith, Farren, Mosley	4:08
12.	"The One That Really Matters" (featuring Kari Jobe)	Jennie Lee Riddle, Dustin Smith	6:59
Total length:			56:35

Target Exclusive edition
No.	Title	Writer(s)	Length
13.	"You Are the Fire" (live)	Farren, Lee	4:28
14.	"All Arise" (live)	Smith, Ingram	4:45
15.	"I Lay Me Down" (live)	Smith, Farren, Mosley	4:16

iTunes Deluxe edition
No.	Title	Writer(s)	Length
13.	"You Are the Fire" (Live)	Farren, Lee	4:28
14.	"All Arise" (live)	Smith, Ingram	4:45
15.	"I Lay Me Down" (live)	Smith, Farren, Mosley	4:16
16.	"You Won't Let Go" (live video)	Smith, Fields, Mosley	4:02
17.	"Sovereign Over Us" (live video)	Brown, Keyes, Mooring	6:09
18.	"The One That Really Matters" (featuring Kari Jobe (live video))	Riddle, Dustin Smith	9:14

Deluxe Edition DVD
No.	Title	Length
1.	"You Won't Let Go" (live video)
2.	"You Are the Fire" (live video)
3.	"Hide Myself" (live video)
4.	"The Same Power" (live video)
5.	"All Arise" (live video)
6.	"Sovereign Over Us" (live video)
7.	"I Lay Me Down" (live video)
8.	"Christ Be All Around Me" (live video)
9.	"The One That Really Matters" (live video)
10.	"You Are the Fire (reprise)" (live video)

== Personnel ==
- Michael W. Smith – lead vocals, backing vocals (1–4), acoustic piano (5–9, 11, 12)
- Seth Mosley – keyboards (1), programming (1, 3, 9, 11), acoustic piano (3), synthesizers (3), guitars (3, 5, 9, 11), bass (3), backing vocals (3, 5, 9, 11), acoustic guitar (7)
- Christopher Stevens – keyboards (1, 2, 4), programming (1, 2, 4), backing vocals (1, 2, 4), guitars (4), drums (4)
- Jeremy Edwardson – keyboards (6, 8), backing vocals (6, 8)
- Andrew Jackson – keyboards (6, 8)
- Jonathan Berlin – additional keyboards (6), acoustic guitar (6), guitars (6, 8), bass (6, 8)
- Jim Daneker – keyboards (7), synthesizers (7), programming (7)
- Trey Gunn – string arrangements (8, 10), keyboards (10)
- Tim Lauer – programming (9, 11), percussion (11), string arrangements (11)
- Chris Lacorte – guitars (1, 2)
- Nick Schwartz – guitars (1)
- Bryan Fowler – guitars (4), percussion (4)
- Wes King – acoustic guitars (4)
- Ben Clark – banjo (4)
- Stuart Garrard – guitars (5)
- Tore Kulleseid – guitars (6, 8, 10), acoustic guitar (10)
- Glenn Pearce – guitars (7)
- Stephen Leiweke – guitars (12)
- Joshua Silverberg – guitars (12)
- Jacob Lowery – bass (1, 4, 7, 12)
- Tony Lucido – bass (2, 5, 9, 11)
- Brandon Aaronson – bass (10)
- Will Sayles – drums (1, 2)
- Steve Kadar – drums (3)
- Nick Buda – drums (5, 9, 11)
- Dylan Barrett – drums (6, 10)
- Raymond Boyd – drums (7), percussion (7)
- Josh Fisher – drums (8)
- Jacob Schrodt – drums (12)
- David Henry – strings (5)
- Lewis Patzner – cello (8, 10), double bass (8, 10)
- Anton Patzner – viola (8, 10), violin (8, 10)
- Sarighani Reist – cello (11)
- Kristin Wilkinson – viola (11)
- David Angell – violin (11)
- David Davidson – violin (11)
- Stephen Lamb – music copyist (11)
- Cara Fox – cello (12)
- Philip King – backing vocals (1, 2)
- Sam Hancock – backing vocals (1, 2, 4)
- Skye Parrish – backing vocals (1, 2)
- Mercy Stevens – backing vocals (1, 2, 4)
- Bryan Fowler – backing vocals (4)
- Lauren Daigle – backing vocals (5)
- Stephen Duncan – backing vocals (5)
- Gabe Kossol – backing vocals (6)
- Andrew Ehernzeller – backing vocals (10)
- Laura Cooksey – backing vocals (11)
- Kari Jobe – lead vocals (12)
- Bellarive – backing vocals (12)

Group vocals

- Kyle Lee (3)
- Seth Mosley (3, 5, 7, 9, 11)
- Jim Daneker (5, 7, 9, 11),
- Stephen Duncan (5)
- Mia Fieldes (5, 7, 9, 11)
- Rachel Hale (5, 7, 9, 11)
- Jamie Jamgochian (5, 7, 9, 11)
- Jon Lewis (5)
- David Myers (5, 7, 9, 11)
- Rhyan Shirley (5)
- James Tealy (5, 7, 9, 11)
- Kendall Young (5, 7, 9, 11)
- Laura Cooksey (7, 9, 11)

Production

- Michael W. Smith – executive producer
- Greg Ham – executive producer
- Christopher York – executive producer
- Christopher Stevens – producer, engineer at fabmusic, Franklin, Tennessee (1, 2, 4), mixing at fabmusic Franklin, Tennessee
- Seth Mosley – producer (3, 5, 7, 9, 11), engineer (3, 5)
- Jeremy Edwardson – producer, engineer at The Soundhouse, Redding, California (6, 8, 10)
- Joshua Silverberg – producer (12), engineer (12) at redredstudio, Nashville, Tennessee and The Manor, Franklin, Tennessee
- Jericho Scoggins – assistant engineer and mix assistant (1, 2, 4)
- Michael "X" O'Connor – engineer at Full Circle Music, Franklin, Tennessee (3, 5), at Full Circle Music (7, 9), at Full Circle Music and Brown Owl Studios, Nashville, Tennessee (11)
- Mark Zellmer – engineer at Full Circle Music and Brown Owl Studios, Nashville, Tennessee (11)
- Buckley Miller – additional engineer (1, 2)
- Jeremy Michael – additional engineer (2)
- Andrew Jackson – assistant engineer, production assistant (6, 8, 10)
- Jared Fox – engineer (12)
- Joe LaPorta – mastering at Sterling Sound, New York City
- Sarah Sung – art and design
- Cameron Powell – photography
- Christin Cook – grooming
- Tasia Treimer – styling

== Chart performance ==
Chart performance for Sovereign
Chart (2014)	Peak position
US Billboard 200	10
US Top Christian Albums (Billboard)	1
US Digital Albums (Billboard)	25

Singles
Year	Single	US peak chart positions						
Year	Single	Christian	Christian Airplay	Christian Digital	Christian AC	Christian Hot AC/CHR	Christian Soft AC	Christian AC Indicator
2014	"You Won't Let Go"	13	16	6	21	19	4	12
2014	"Sovereign Over Us"	–	38	–	–	–	7	22
2015	"Sky Spills Over"	18	20	22	–	–	8	19
