= The Big Picture (Michael W. Smith album) =

Studio album by Michael W. Smith
- Released: February 1, 1986
- Recorded: 1985
- Studio: Power Station, Mediasound and Sigma Sound (New York City, New York); Bullet Recording and Emerald Sound (Nashville, Tennessee); The Bennett House and The Castle (Franklin, Tennessee); Blue Jay Recording (Carlisle, Massachusetts)
- Genre: Contemporary Christian music
- Length: 50:39
- Label: Reunion
- Producer: Michael W. Smith; John Potoker

Michael W. Smith chronology
Michael W. Smith 2 (1984)	The Big Picture (1986)	The Live Set (1987)

Professional ratings
Review scores
Source	Rating
AllMusic	4.5/5 stars
Jesus Freak Hideout	4/5 stars

The Big Picture is the third album by contemporary Christian music artist Michael W. Smith, released in 1986 on Reunion Records. The title comes from the song "Pursuit of the Dream," in which it is heard a few times, but also applies to the variety of themes for young people to learn about from the various songs on the album. While "Pursuit of the Dream" instructs the listener to pursue their goals, other themes on the album include the folly of escapism ("Lamu"), sexual abstinence before marriage ("Old Enough to Know"), and maintaining a positive self image ("You're Alright"). The song "Tearing Down The Wall" opens with a reverse snippet of Amy Grant's "Emmanuel". The Big Picture was ranked at number 21 on CCM Magazine's 100 Greatest Albums in Christian Music. Smith won a GMA Dove Award for Pop/Contemporary Album of the Year at the 18th GMA Dove Awards and was nominated for a Grammy for Best Gospel Performance, Male at the 29th Grammy Awards.

== Track listing ==
- All songs written by Michael W. Smith and Wayne Kirkpatrick, except where noted.

CD release
No.	Title	Writer(s)	Length
1.	"Lamu"	Smith, Kirkpatrick, Amy Grant	5:55
2.	"Wired for Sound"		6:00
3.	"Old Enough to Know"		4:47
4.	"Pursuit of the Dream"		5:11
5.	"Rocketown"		4:32
6.	"Voices"		5:50
7.	"The Last Letter"		4:37
8.	"Goin' Thru the Motions"		4:55
9.	"Tearin' Down the Wall"		3:35
10.	"You're Alright"	Smith, Kirkpatrick, Chris Rodriguez	4:36
11.	"Coda" (Hidden track)	Smith	0:41

== Personnel ==
- Michael W. Smith – lead vocals, backing vocals, keyboards, drum programming
- Shane Keister – keyboards, Fairlight programming, drum programming
- Steve Schaffer, with Music Resources – Synclavier programming
- Dann Huff – guitars
- Eddie Martinez – guitars
- Nick Moroch – guitars
- Chris Rodriguez – guitars, backing vocals
- Tony Levin – bass, stick bass
- Gary Lunn – bass, drum programming
- Steve Ferrone – drums
- David Huff – drums, drum programming
- Frank Doyle – drum programming
- Mark Kovac – drum programming
- John Potoker – drum programming
- Bashiri Johnson – percussion
- Michael Brecker – saxophones
- Jim Pugh – trombone
- Randy Brecker – trumpet
- Chris Harris – backing vocals
- Wayne Kirkpatrick – backing vocals

Backing vocals on "Voices"

- Lisa Bevill, Bridgett Evans, Chris Harris, Marty McCall, Philippe Saisse, Leah Taylor and Tammy Taylor

== Production ==
- Executive Producers – Michael Blanton, Dan Harrell and Brown Bannister
- Producers – Michael W. Smith and John Potoker
- Engineer and Mixing – John Potoker
- Assistant Engineers – James "JB" Baird, Spencer Chrislu, Mike Clute, Ken Criblez, Nick Delre, Jeffrey Dovener, Rob Feaster, Jim Goldberger, Ed Goodreau, Tim Hattfield, Bill Heath, Keith Odell, Clarke Schleicher, Bob Vogt and Tony Volante.
- Mastered by Ted Jensen at Sterling Sound (New York, NY).
- Production Coordinator – Kimberly Smith
- Art Direction and Design – Kent Hunter and Thomas Ryan
- Photography – Beverly Ann Moore
- Grooming – Jody Morlock and Julie Miller Overstreet
- Child on album cover – Christopher Copeland

== Chart performance ==
Chart (1986)	Peak position
US Christian Albums (Billboard)	2

== Accolades ==
GMA Dove Awards

Year	Winner	Category
1987	The Big Picture	Pop/Contemporary Album of the Year
