= Go West Young Man (Michael W. Smith album) =

Studio album by Michael W. Smith
- Released: October 1, 1990
- Recorded: 1990
- Studios: BMG Studios (New York City, New York); Deer Valley Studio (Franklin, Tennessee); The Benson Studio, Digital Recorders, OmniSound, Treasure Isle and Sixteenth Avenue Sound (Nashville, Tennessee); Soundtrek Studios (Kansas City, Missouri)
- Genres: Pop; christian rock
- Length: 42:59
- Label: Reunion
- Producers: Michael W. Smith; Bryan Lenox; Wayne Kirkpatrick

Michael W. Smith chronology
Christmas (1989)	Go West Young Man (1990)	Change Your World (1992)

Professional ratings
Review scores
Source	Rating
Allmusic	3/5 stars
Jesus Freak Hideout	4/5 stars

Go West Young Man is the sixth studio album by American singer-songwriter Michael W. Smith, released on October 1, 1990, through Reunion.

== Background ==
Michael W. Smith most notably performed "Place in This World" and "For You" on various shows, such as The Arsenio Hall Show, to promote the album. The record was a mainstream crossover success for Smith and became a platinum album. In 1991, "Place in This World" peaked at number 6 on the US Billboard Hot 100, number 3 on Cashbox and number 5 on the Adult Contemporary chart. Videos were produced for both singles released and received much radio airplay. Several of the songs from this album made it into his greatest hits album, The First Decade (1983-1993).

== Track listing ==
No.	Title	Writer(s)	Length
1.	"Go West Young Man"	Michael W. Smith, Wayne Kirkpatrick	4:01
2.	"Love Crusade"	Smith, Kirkpatrick	4:23
3.	"Place in This World"	Kirkpatrick, Amy Grant, Smith	4:01
4.	"For You"	Smith, William Owsley III, Kirkpatrick	4:10
5.	"How Long Will Be Too Long"	Smith, Kirkpatrick, Grant	4:37
6.	"Seed to Sow"	Smith, Kirkpatrick	6:14
7.	"Cross My Heart"	Smith, Kirkpatrick	4:37
8.	"Emily"	Smith, Kirkpatrick	4:17
9.	"Agnus Dei"	Smith	5:09
10.	"1990"	Smith	1:42

== Personnel ==
- Michael W. Smith – lead vocals, keyboards, keyboard programming, backing vocals (2), choir arrangements (6), acoustic piano (9)
- Mike Lawler – additional keyboards (1, 3, 6, 7, 9, 10), Hammond B3 organ (5), programming (6, 10), synth bass (6, 10), drums (6, 10), percussion (6, 10), synth solo (7), keyboard programming
- Bryan Lenox – additional keyboards (1, 7), percussion (2–4, 6–10), drums (3, 4, 6, 7, 9), keyboard programming
- Trace Scarborough – keyboard programming
- Dann Huff – guitar (1–3, 6, 8, 9)
- Jerry McPherson – guitar (4, 5, 7, 9)
- Will Owsley – guitar (4), guitar solo (4)
- Chris Rodriguez – backing vocals (1, 2, 5, 10), guitar (10)
- Tommy Sims – bass guitar (1, 2, 5, 8), synth bass (4), stick bass (9), keyboard programming
- Matt Pierson – synth bass (3), fretless bass (7)
- Paul Leim – drums (1, 2, 5, 8), percussion (2)
- Terry McMillan – percussion (1–9)
- Mark Douthit – saxophones (1, 3, 4)
- Sam Levine – saxophones (2, 6)
- Barry Green – trombone (1–4), trombone solo (4)
- Chris McDonald – horn arrangements (1–4, 6), trombone (6)
- Mike Haynes – trumpet (1, 3, 4, 6)
- George Tidwell – trumpet (1)
- The Nashville String Machine – strings (3, 8, 9)
- Ronn Huff – string arrangements and conductor (3, 8, 9), choir arrangements (6)
- Carl Gorodetzsky – concertmaster and contractor (3, 8, 9)
- Chris Eaton – backing vocals (1, 2, 4, 7)
- Wayne Kirkpatrick – backing vocals (1, 2, 4, 7, 10)
- Jimmy Marks – backing vocals (2)
- Chris Harris – backing vocals (4, 6, 7, 10)
- Vince Ebo – backing vocals (5)
- Vicki Hampton – backing vocals (5, 6)
- Africa Children's Choir – choir (6)
- Gertrude Kafeero – choir director (6)
- Darla Peters – tour leader (6)
- The American Boychoir – choir (9)
- Nathan Wadley – soloist (9)

== Production ==
- Executive Producers – Michael Blanton and Terry Hemmings
- Producer – Michael W. Smith
- Co-producer – Bryan Lenox
- Vocal Producer – Wayne Kirkpatrick
- Engineers – Bill Deaton, Pasquale Delvillagio, Pat Hutchinson, Gregg Jampol, Patrick Kelly, Brent King, Bryan Lenox, Don Martin, Dave Murphy, Rick Rowe, Bret Teegarden, and Bill Whittington.
- Mixed by Humberto Gatica
- Mix Assistants – David Parker and Alejandro Rodriguez
- Edited by Nick Palladino at Scene Three, Inc. (Nashville, TN).
- Mastered by Stephen Marcussen at Precision Disc Mastering (Hollywood, CA).
- A&R – Don Donahue and Richard Headen
- Art Direction – Buddy Jackson and Deb Rhodes
- Design – Beth Middleworth for Jackson Design
- Photography – Mark Tucker
- Styling – Mary Jane Starke
- MWS personal assistant – Elizabeth Leighton Jones

== Charts ==
=== Weekly ===
Weekly chart performance for Go West Young Man
Chart (1991)	Peak position
US Billboard 200	74
US Top Christian Albums (Billboard)	1

=== Year-end ===
Year-end chart performance for Go West Young Man
Chart (1991)	Position
US Top Christian Albums (Billboard)	1

== Certifications ==
Certifications for Go West Young Man
Region	Certification	Certified units/sales
Canada (Music Canada)	Gold	50,000^{^}
United States (RIAA)	Platinum	1,000,000^{^}
^{^} Shipments figures based on certification alone.

== Accolades ==
GMA Dove Awards

Year	Winner	Category
1991	Go West Young Man	Pop/Contemporary Album of the Year
