= Michael W. Smith 2 =

Studio album by Michael W. Smith
- Released: February 23, 1984
- Recorded: 1983
- Studio: The Bennett House (Franklin, Tennessee); Tree International Studio and Bullet Recording (Nashville, Tennessee); Mama Jo's Recording Studio (North Hollywood, California)
- Genre: Contemporary Christian Music
- Length: 36:18
- Label: Reunion
- Producer: Michael W. Smith

Michael W. Smith chronology
Michael W. Smith Project (1983)	Michael W. Smith 2 (1984)	The Big Picture (1986)

Professional ratings
Review scores
Source	Rating
AllMusic	2.5/5 stars
Jesus Freak Hideout	4.5/5 stars

Michael W. Smith 2 is the second album by Christian recording artist Michael W. Smith. Released in February 1984, "I Am Sure" and "Hosanna" were released to Christian radio. Among the musicians who contributed to the recording, Dann Huff and Mike Brignardello went on to form the band Giant. Huff was also a founding member of the CCM band White Heart. The album would win him his first Grammy Award for Best Gospel Performance, Male in 1985.

== Track listing ==
CD release
No.	Title	Writer(s)	Length
1.	"A Way"	Michael W. Smith, Gary Chapman, Tim Marsh	3:49
2.	"I Am Sure"	M. Smith, Mike Hudson	4:41
3.	"End of the Book"	M. Smith, Hudson	4:08
4.	"I'm Up"	M. Smith, Hudson	3:11
5.	"Glorious Grace"	M. Smith, Deborah D. Smith	3:19
6.	"Musical Instruments"	M. Smith	1:06
7.	"Restless Heart"	M. Smith, Amy Grant	5:00
8.	"All I Needed to Say"	M. Smith, Grant, Chapman	4:21
9.	"Wings of the Wind"	M. Smith	4:14
10.	"Hosanna"	M. Smith, D. Smith	2:29

== Personnel ==
Adapted from AllMusic credits:

- Michael W. Smith – lead vocals, synthesizers, electric piano (1, 7, 8), backing vocals (2–5, 7, 8), vocoder (3, 4, 7, 9), acoustic piano (4)
- Shane Keister – additional synthesizers (5, 8, 9)
- Dann Huff – guitars (1–4, 6–10)
- Leland Sklar – bass (1, 6)
- Mike Brignardello – bass (2–4, 7–10), Minimoog (7)
- Mark Hammond – Roland TR-909 drum machine (1), Simmons drums (1, 6)
- Paul Leim – drums (2–4, 7–10), LinnDrum (2, 7, 9)
- Lenny Castro – percussion (1–4, 6–9)
- Gary Chapman – backing vocals (1, 8)
- Ron Downey – backing vocals (2, 3, 5, 10)
- David Durham – backing vocals (2, 5, 10)
- Chris Harris – backing vocals (3, 10)
- Gary Pigg – backing vocals (3, 10)
- Amy Grant – backing vocals (7, 8)
- Jackie Cusic – backing vocals (10)
- Teresa Ellis – backing vocals (10)
- Bridgett Evans – backing vocals (10)
- Jan Harris – backing vocals (10)
- Kim Smith – backing vocals (10)
- Dave Thornton – backing vocals (10)

== Production ==
- Michael Blanton – executive producer
- Dan Harrell – executive producer
- Michael W. Smith – producer
- Brown Bannister – vocal production
- Jack Joseph Puig – engineer, mixing
- Jim Baird – additional engineer
- Don Cobb – additional engineer
- Steven Ford – additional engineer
- Stephen McAlister – additional engineer
- Mike Psanos – additional engineer
- Doug Sax – mastering at The Mastering Lab (Los Angeles, California)
- Kent Hunter – artwork, design
- Mark Tucker – photography

== Chart performance ==
Chart (1984)	Peak position
US Christian Albums (Billboard)	4
