= Terry McMillan (musician) =

American country music singer and musician (1953–2007)

- Born: Terry Lee McMillan; October 12, 1953; Lexington, North Carolina, U.S.
- Died: February 2, 2007 (aged 53) Pigeon Forge, Tennessee, U.S.
- Genres: Country; blues; gospel
- Occupation: Musician
- Instruments: Vocals; harmonica; drums; percussion
- Years active: 1973–2007
- Labels: RCA, Step One, Giant

Terry Lee McMillan (October 12, 1953 – February 2, 2007) was an American country music singer, harmonica player, and percussionist. In 1973, he became a member of Eddy Raven's band in Nashville, and worked with Raven until 1974. McMillan then started working with Chet Atkins, playing harmonica with his touring show. Later, he toured with Jerry Reed and Jeannie C. Riley before becoming a very in-demand session musician. In the 1970s, McMillan appeared on many albums, including the recordings of Mickey Newbury and Gary Stewart. He was also featured many times on Trinity Broadcasting in the 1990s.

== Career ==
Chet Atkins signed Terry as a solo artist for RCA Records in the early 1980s, charting at number 85 on Hot Country Songs with "Love Is a Full Time Thing". He returned to being a session musician, appearing live with, and on numerous albums for, artists including Ray Charles, Dolly Parton, Willie Nelson, Don Williams, Garth Brooks, George Jones, Hank Williams Jr., Merle Haggard, Reba McEntire, Randy Travis, Johnny Cash, Kris Kristofferson, Roy Orbison, Kenny Chesney, Emmylou Harris, Neil Young, Waylon Jennings, Brooks & Dunn, JJ Cale, Trisha Yearwood, Amy Grant, Gaither Homecoming and many others. In 1993, he played at President Bill Clinton's inaugural ball, with David Pack's (Ambrosia) All Star Band, giving a solo harmonica performance of "Amazing Grace". He recorded an album for Step One Records in 1993, with Nashville's Christ Church Choir. McMillan became one of country music's most popular session and in demand musicians on harmonica and percussion of all time.

After his family's house was destroyed in a 1992 house fire, McMillan became a devout Christian and focused extensively on inspirational music. In 1993, he released his first album, I've Got a Feeling, on Step One Records. He also released an album for Giant Records, Somebody's Comin' in 1997. In succeeding years, he became a frequent guest on Christian television programs.

McMillan died in Pigeon Forge, Tennessee, on February 2, 2007, at the age of 53.

== Discography ==
=== Albums ===
Title	Details
I've Got a Feeling	Release date: August 31, 1993; Label: Step One Records
Somebody's Comin'	Release date: February 11, 1997; Label: Giant Records

=== Singles ===
Year	Single	US Country	Album
1981	"All I Really Want to Do"	—	singles only
1982	"Love is a Full Time Thing"	85	singles only
1993	"I've Got a Feeling"	—	I've Got a Feeling
1997	"Somebody's Comin'"	—	Somebody's Comin'

== Collaborations ==
- New Harvest...First Gathering - Dolly Parton (1977)
- Grasshopper - J. J. Cale (1982)
- Age to Age - Amy Grant (1982)
- Heartbreak Express - Dolly Parton (1982)
- Great Hits of the Past - Chet Atkins (1983)
- Dangerous - Tony Joe White (1983)
- Once in a Very Blue Moon - Nanci Griffith (1984)
- Old Ways - Neil Young (1985)
- I 2 (EYE) - Michael W. Smith (1988)
- Take It to Heart - Michael McDonald (1990)
- Go West Young Man - Michael W. Smith (1990)
- Tennessee Woman - Tanya Tucker (1990)
- Love Is Strange - Kenny Rogers (1990)
- Carry On - Patti Austin (1991)
- What Do I Do with Me - Tanya Tucker (1991)
- Back Home Again - Kenny Rogers (1991)
- Change Your World - Michael W. Smith (1992)
- King of Hearts - Roy Orbison (1992)
- Renegade Gentleman - Larry Carlton (GRP, 1993)
- Slow Dancing with the Moon - Dolly Parton (1993)
- Shania Twain - Shania Twain (1993)
- Tell Me Why - Wynonna Judd (1993)
- Take Me as I Am - Faith Hill (1993)
- House of Love - Amy Grant (1994)
- Return to Pooh Corner - Kenny Loggins (1994)
- Something Special - Dolly Parton (1995)
- All I Want - Tim McGraw (1995)
- All I Need to Know - Kenny Chesney (1996)
- Revelations - Wynonna Judd (1996)
- Blue - LeAnn Rimes (1996)
- Golden Heart - Mark Knopfler (1996)
- All That Matters - Michael Bolton (1997)
- Behind the Eyes - Amy Grant (1997)
- Live the Life - Michael W. Smith (1998)
- Faith - Faith Hill (1998)
- The Trouble with Angels - Juice Newton (1998)
- No Place That Far - Sara Evans (1998)
- Breathe - Faith Hill (1999)
- Blue Obsession - Michael McDonald (2000)
