= Dann Huff =

American record producer and songwriter

- Born: Dann Lee Huff; November 15, 1960 (age 65)
- Origin: Nashville, Tennessee, U.S.
- Genres: Country; hard rock; contemporary Christian music; glam metal
- Occupations: Record producer; Singer; Songwriter
- Instruments: Vocals; guitar
- Years active: 1976–present
- Formerly of: Giant; White Heart

Dann Lee Huff (born November 15, 1960) is an American record producer, guitarist and songwriter. For his work as a producer in the country music genre, he has won several awards, including the Musician of the Year award in 2001, 2004, and 2016 at the Country Music Association Awards and the Producer of the Year award in 2006 and 2009 at the Academy of Country Music. Huff was initially known as the frontman for White Heart from 1982–1984, then received acclaim as the founder of Giant. He is the father of American singer and songwriter Ashlyne Huff, and brother of drummer David Huff.

== Career ==
Dann Lee Huff was born November 15, 1960, in Nashville, Tennessee. He attended Brentwood Academy. His father, Ronn Huff, was an arranger, composer and conductor who wrote orchestrations for film and television and was the pops conductor for the Nashville Symphony. Huff began his career as part of the original Christian rock band White Heart in which he played with his brother David Huff, and later in the melodic 80s-style hard rock band, Giant, that produced 2 albums but ultimately never caught on as the rock styles transitioned into the 1990s grunge rock. He has since then been active as a session guitarist and producer in both rock music and country music with his first guitar recording debut for Ron Haffkine and Kyle Lehning. In the 1980s, Huff played guitar on albums for Michael Jackson, Amy Grant, Scritti Politti, Whitesnake, Roger Hodgson, Steven Curtis Chapman, Doro Pesch, Juice Newton, Michael W. Smith, Whitecross, Peter Cetera and George Benson, Whitney Houston's debut album Whitney Houston, Barbra Streisand, Kenny Rogers, Warren Hill, Johnny Van Zant, and more. Since the 1990s, Huff has been working as a producer for various bands and artists, touring with Hank Williams, Jr, some of which include Faith Hill, Megadeth, Rebecca St. James, Rascal Flatts and Lonestar.

The songs Huff has played on include Whitesnake's 1987 US radio version of "Here I Go Again" and Michael W. Smith's Go West Young Man.

In 2012, Huff produced three songs with Nathan Chapman for Taylor Swift's fourth studio album, Red.

On 30 May 2025, Huff’s first solo album, ‘When Words Aren’t Enough’, was released via digital download, on CD, and on vinyl.

== Collaborations ==
- Born to Love – Peabo Bryson, Roberta Flack (1983)
- Emergency – Melissa Manchester (1983)
- Nightline – Randy Crawford (1983)
- Righteous Anger – Van Stephenson (1984)
- Straight Ahead – Amy Grant (1984)
- What About Me? – Kenny Rogers (1984)
- Can't Wait All Night – Juice Newton (1984)
- Civilized Man – Joe Cocker (1984)
- Starchild – Teena Marie (1984)
- Michael W. Smith 2 – Michael W. Smith (1984)
- Emotion – Barbra Streisand (1984)
- Dancing with Danger – Sam Phillips (1984)
- I Feel for You – Chaka Khan (1984)
- Self Control – Laura Branigan (1984)
- The Wonders of His Love – Philip Bailey (1985)
- Unguarded – Amy Grant (1985)
- Mathematics – Melissa Manchester (1985)
- Hold Me – Laura Branigan (1985)
- 20/20 – George Benson (1985)
- Jane Wiedlin – Jane Wiedlin (1985)
- Watching You, Watching Me – Bill Withers (1985)
- Say You Love Me – Jennifer Holliday (1985)
- Black and White in a Grey World – Sam Phillips (1985)
- Take No Prisoners – Peabo Bryson (1985)
- Suspicious Heart – Van Stephenson (1986)
- Cocker – Joe Cocker (1986)
- Headed for the Future – Neil Diamond (1986)
- The Big Picture – Michael W. Smith (1986)
- Winner in You – Patti LaBelle (1986)
- Destiny – Chaka Khan (1986)
- Emotional – Jeffrey Osborne (1986)
- Like a Rock – Bob Seger (1986)
- Solitude/Solitaire – Peter Cetera (1986)
- No easy Way out – Robert Tepper (1986)
- True Blue – Madonna (1986)
- So Glad I Know – Deniece Williams (1986)
- They Don't Make Them Like They Used To – Kenny Rogers (1986)
- Heart Over Mind – Jennifer Rush (1987)
- Swing Street – Barry Manilow (1987)
- Beverly Hills Cop II – Bob Seger (1987) - played guitar for "Shakedown"
- I Prefer the Moonlight – Kenny Rogers (1987)
- Reservations for Two – Dionne Warwick (1987)
- Get Close to My Love – Jennifer Holliday (1987)
- Emotion – Juice Newton (1987)
- All Systems Go – Donna Summer (1987)
- Everlasting – Natalie Cole (1987)
- Tiffany – Tiffany (1987)
- Bad – Michael Jackson (1987)
- Heaven on Earth – Belinda Carlisle (1987)
- Brazilian Romance – Sarah Vaughan (1987)
- Rainbow – Dolly Parton (1987)
- Get Here – Brenda Russell (1988)
- One More Story – Peter Cetera (1988)
- Forever Your Girl – Paula Abdul (1988)
- Not Me – Glenn Medeiros (1988)
- I 2 (EYE) – Michael W. Smith (1988)
- Till I Loved You – Barbra Streisand (1988)
- Oasis – Roberta Flack (1988)
- Lead Me On – Amy Grant (1988)
- Other Roads – Boz Scaggs (1988)
- The Rumour – Olivia Newton-John (1988)
- In the City of Angels – Jon Anderson (1988)
- Union – Toni Childs (1988)
- Back to Avalon – Kenny Loggins (1988)
- Bowling in Paris – Stephen Bishop (1989)
- Soul Provider – Michael Bolton (1989)
- Like a Prayer – Madonna (1989)
- Christmas – Michael W. Smith (1989)
- Mr. Jordan – Julian Lennon (1989)
- Be Yourself – Patti LaBelle (1989)
- Barry Manilow – Barry Manilow (1989)
- Laura Branigan – Laura Branigan (1990)
- For the Sake of the Call – Steven Curtis Chapman (1990)
- Other Voices – Paul Young (1990)
- Go West Young Man – Michael W. Smith (1991)
- The Fire Inside – Bob Seger (1991)
- Heart in Motion – Amy Grant (1991)
- Show Me Your Way – Glen Campbell (1991)
- Vagabond Heart – Rod Stewart (1991)
- Home for Christmas – Amy Grant (1992)
- Change Your World – Michael W. Smith (1992)
- Wings of Victory – Glen Campbell (1992)
- The Great Adventure – Steven Curtis Chapman (1992)
- If Only My Heart Had a Voice – Kenny Rogers (1993)
- Home for the Holidays – Glen Campbell (1993)
- The Way That I Am – Martina McBride (1993)
- Duets – Elton John (1993)
- The One Thing – Michael Bolton (1993)
- Take Me as I Am – Faith Hill (1993)
- Clay Walker – Clay Walker (1993)
- Cheap Seats – Alabama (1993)
- Through the Fire – Peabo Bryson (1994)
- Merry Christmas – Mariah Carey (1994)
- Heaven in the Real World – Steven Curtis Chapman (1994)
- Not a Moment Too Soon – Tim McGraw (1994)
- Let the Picture Paint Itself – Rodney Crowell (1994)
- House of Love – Amy Grant (1994)
- One Emotion – Clint Black (1994)
- Read My Mind (album) – Reba McEntire (1994)
- Blackhawk (album) – Blackhawk (1995)
- Christmas Spirit – Donna Summer (1994)
- It Matters to Me – Faith Hill (1995)
- I Think About You – Collin Raye (1995)
- Little Acts of Treason – Carlene Carter (1995)
- Dreaming of You – Selena (1995)
- Fire to Fire – Tanya Tucker (1995)
- Strong Enough (Blackhawk album) – Blackhawk (1995)
- Brett James (album) – Brett James (1995)
- The Music of Christmas – Steven Curtis Chapman (1995)
- One Clear Voice – Peter Cetera (1995)
- The Woman in Me – Shania Twain (1995)
- All I Want – Tim McGraw (1995)
- A Very Fine Love – Dusty Springfield (1995)
- Jesus Freak – dc Talk (1995)
- Shake (John Schlitt album) - John Schlitt (1995)
- Wild Angels – Martina McBride (1995)
- In Pictures – Alabama (1993)
- This Is The Time: The Christmas Album – Michael Bolton (1996)
- Blue – LeAnn Rimes (1996)
- Christmas: The Gift – Collin Raye (1996)
- Right in the Middle of It – Chely Wright (1996)
- Summer of '78 – Barry Manilow (1996)
- I'll Lead You Home – Michael W. Smith (1996)
- Revelations – Wynonna Judd (1996)
- Measure of a Man (Kevin Sharp album) – Kevin Sharp (1996)
- Unfit for Swine - John Schlitt 1996)
- All That Matters – Michael Bolton (1997)
- Burnin' Daylight - Burnin' Daylight (1997)
- Let's Talk About Love – Céline Dion (1997)
- Words (Sherrié Austin album) – Sherrié Austin (1997)
- Everywhere – Tim McGraw (1997)
- Behind the Eyes – Amy Grant (1997)
- Higher Ground – Barbra Streisand (1997)
- Love's Been Rough on Me – Etta James (1997)
- Come On Over – Shania Twain (1997)
- Cryptic Writings- Megadeth (1997)
- The Other Side – Wynonna Judd (1997)
- Evolution – Martina McBride (1997)
- The Walls Came Down – Collin Raye (1998)
- Big Hopes – Ty Herndon (1998)
- A Body of Work – Paul Anka (1998)
- Faith – Faith Hill (1998)
- These Are Special Times – Céline Dion (1998)
- Shot Full of Love – Billy Ray Cyrus (1998)
- Live the Life – Michael W. Smith (1998)
- Lonely Grill – Lonestar (1999)
- The Whole SHeBANG – SHeDAISY (1999)
- Risk - Megadeth (1999)
- Breathe – Faith Hill (1999)
- Emotion – Martina McBride (1999)
- Timeless: The Classics Vol. 2 – Michael Bolton (1999)
- Southern Rain – Billy Ray Cyrus (2000)
- This Way – Jewel (2001)
- Cry – Faith Hill (2002)
- What the World Needs Now Is Love – Wynonna Judd (2003)
- Martina – Martina McBride (2003)
- When the Sun Goes Down – Kenny Chesney (2004)
- "We Can" - LeAnn Rimes (2003)
- This Woman – LeAnn Rimes (2005)
- Fireflies – Faith Hill (2005)
- Some Hearts – Carrie Underwood (2005)
- Water & Bridges – Kenny Rogers (2006)
- Whatever We Wanna – LeAnn Rimes (2006)
- Waking Up Laughing – Martina McBride (2007)
- Family – LeAnn Rimes (2007)
- Joy to the World – Faith Hill (2008)
- Shine – Martina McBride (2009)
- Get Closer — Keith Urban (2010)
- Stronger – Kelly Clarkson (2011)
- Eleven – Martina McBride (2011)
- Red – Taylor Swift (2012)
- You Can't Make Old Friends – Kenny Rogers (2013)
- Everlasting – Martina McBride (2014)
- Down to My Last Bad Habit – Vince Gill (2016)
- Reckless – Martina McBride (2016)
- Playing with Fire – Jennifer Nettles (2016)
- The Rest of Our Life – Tim McGraw, Faith Hill (2017)
- Wide Open – Michael McDonald (2017)
- Bridges – Josh Groban (2018)
