= Michael W. Smith Project =

Studio album by Michael W. Smith
- Released: February 8, 1983
- Recorded: 1982
- Studio: Tree International Studio (Nashville, Tennessee)
- Genre: Contemporary Christian music
- Length: 40:44
- Label: Reunion
- Producer: Michael W. Smith

Michael W. Smith chronology
Michael W. Smith Project (1983)	Michael W. Smith 2 (1984)

Original cover

Professional ratings
Review scores
Source	Rating
AllMusic	3/5 stars
Jesus Freak Hideout	5/5 stars

Michael W. Smith Project is the debut album of Christian recording artist Michael W. Smith. The first single from the album, Great Is The Lord, went all the way to number 1 on the US Christian AC and CHR charts.

Originally released in 1983, the album was reissued in 1987 with a new cover featuring an updated photo of Smith. The album reached number nine on the Top Contemporary Christian chart.CCM Magazine ranked Michael W. Smith Project at number 34 on their 2001 book CCM Presents: The 100 Greatest Albums in Christian Music. Smith earned his first Grammy nomination for Best Gospel Performance, Male at the 26th Grammy Awards.

== Track listing ==
All tracks are written by Michael W. Smith and Deborah D. Smith, except where noted.

Side one
No.	Title	Writer(s)	Length
1.	"Sonata in D Major"	M. Smith	1:13
2.	"You Need a Savior"		3:34
3.	"Could He Be the Messiah"		4:28
4.	"Too Many Times"		4:25
5.	"Be Strong and Courageous"		3:42
6.	"Looking Up"	M. Smith	3:23
Total length:			20:45

Side two
No.	Title	Writer(s)	Length
1.	"The Race is On"		3:41
2.	"First Light"/"Love in the Light"		5:30
3.	"Friends"		4:16
4.	"Great Is the Lord"		2:52
5.	"Alpha Overture"	M. Smith	3:40
Total length:			19:59

Note: "First Light" was titled "From Light" on the original vinyl and cassette releases.

== Personnel ==
- Michael W. Smith – lead vocals, backing vocals, acoustic piano, Fender Rhodes, Yamaha GS2, Prophet-5 synthesizers
- Shane Keister – Oberheim OB-X, Prophet-5 synthesizers, vocoder
- Jon Goin – guitars
- Mike Brignardello – bass
- Mark Hammond – drums, Roland TR-808 drum machine on "First Light"
- Mike Psanos – percussion
- Denis Solee – saxophone
- Gary Chapman – backing vocals
- Jackie Cusic – backing vocals
- Diana DeWitt – backing vocals
- David Durham – backing vocals
- Teresa Ellis – backing vocals
- Amy Grant – backing vocals on "Friends"
- Pam Mark Hall – backing vocals
- Chris Harris – backing vocals
- Gary Pigg – backing vocals
- Kim Smith – backing vocals

== Production ==
- Michael Blanton – executive producer
- Dan Harrell – executive producer
- Michael W. Smith – producer, assistant engineer
- Mike Psanos – engineer
- Brown Bannister – assistant engineer
- John Woods – assistant engineer
- Jack Joseph Puig – remixing
- Hank Williams – mastering at Woodland Sound Studios (Nashville, Tennessee)
- Bill Brunt – art direction
- Tim Campbell – photography

== Chart performance ==
Chart (1983)	Peak position
US Christian Albums (Billboard)	9
