= White Heart discography =

- Studio albums: 11
- Live albums: 1
- Compilation albums: 11

The discography of White Heart, an American contemporary Christian music pop-rock band, consists of 11 studio albums. The band released its eponymous debut album in January 1982, after which followed 10 additional studio recordings and numerous official and unofficial compilations. Despite their standing as one of the premier CCM bands, White Heart never won a Dove Award. The band was inducted in the Christian Music Hall of Fame on November 6, 2010.

Although subject to numerous line-up changes, the core founding members were guitarist Billy Smiley and keyboardist/vocalist Mark Gersmehl. Longtime singer Rick Florian joined the band in 1986 after working as their roadie.

== Discography ==
=== Studio albums ===
White Heart

- Released: 1982 (Remastered: 2021. Girder Records)
- Label: Home Sweet Home Records
- Producer: Dann Huff, Mark Gersmehl, Billy Smiley

Vital Signs

- Released: 1984 (Remastered: 2021. Girder Records)
- Label: Home Sweet Home Records
- Producer: Billy Smiley

Hotline

- Released: 1985 (Remastered: 2021. Girder Records)
- Label: Home Sweet Home Records
- Producer: Billy Smiley

Don't Wait for the Movie

- Released: 1986
- Formats: CD, CS, LP
- Label: Sparrow Records
- Producer: Billy Smiley; White Heart

Emergency Broadcast

- Released: 1987
- Label: Sparrow Records
- Producer: White Heart

Freedom

- Released: 1989
- Label: Sparrow Records
- Producer: Brown Bannister

Powerhouse

- Released: 1990
- Label: Star Song Records
- Producer: Bill Drescher

Tales of Wonder

- Released: 1992
- Label: Star Song Records
- Producer: Billy Smiley; Mark Gersmehl

Highlands

- Released: 1993
- Label: Star Song Records
- Producer: Billy Smiley; Mark Gersmehl

Inside

- Released: 1995
- Label: Curb Records
- Producer: Ken Scott

Redemption

- Released: 1997
- Label: Curb Records
- Producer: Billy Smiley; Mark Gersmehl

=== Live albums ===
- Live at Six Flags (1986) Home Sweet Home Records

=== Compilation albums ===
- White Heart Greatest Hits (1987) Home Sweet Home Records
- White Heart/Vital Signs (1989) Home Sweet Home Records
- Souvenirs (1990) Sparrow Records
- Quiet Storm: The Ballads (1993) Home Sweet Home Records
- Nothing But the Best: Rock Classics (1994) Star Song Records
- Nothing But the Best: Radio Classics (1994) Star Song Records
- Attack! Ten Explosive Hits (1995) Star Song Records
- White Heart: The Early Years (1996) Star Song Records
- Hits from the Heart (1999) BCI Music
- The Millennium Archives: Demos, Interviews, and Lost Songs (2000) Home Sweet Home Records
- Very Best of Whiteheart (2006) EMI Christian Music Group
