= Nothing But the Best: Radio Classics =

Compilation album by White Heart
- Released: 1994
- Recorded: 1986–1994
- Genre: Christian rock, Christian pop
- Label: Star Song Records
- Producer: Billy Smiley, Mark Gersmehl, White Heart, Brown Bannister, Bill Drescher

White Heart chronology
Nothing But the Best: Rock Classics (1994)	Nothing But the Best: Radio Classics (1994)	Inside (1995)

Professional ratings
Review scores
Source	Rating
AllMusic	4.5/5 stars
Cross Rhythms	6/10 stars

Nothing But the Best: Radio Classics is an official 1994 compilation album by the Christian rock band White Heart. This is the second of two albums by White Heart with the other being Nothing But the Best: Rock Classics, as they were released separately. This collection features songs from both the Sparrow and Star Song years 1986-1994 focusing on their Christian radio hits in AC and CHR/pop, many of them went to number one, where as Rock Classics focuses on their rock cuts from the same period. Radio Classics features a new song, "My Eyes Have Seen", and a full-length version of "Morningstar." A shorter version was heard on their 1992 album Tales of Wonder. Both tracks were released as Christian radio singles from this collection. Session musician Mark Hill was brought in and played bass guitar on both new songs and replaced Anthony Sallee who had left the group after the release of 1993's Highlands. The album debuted and peaked at number 29 on the Billboard Top Christian Albums chart.

== Track listing ==
All songs written by Mark Gersmehl and Billy Smiley, except where noted.

No.	Title	Writer(s)	Original album	Length
1.	"Morningstar"	M. Gersmehl, B. Smiley, Jon Knox	New recording	4:20
2.	"My Eyes Have Seen"		New recording	4:12
3.	"How Many Times (Seventy Times Seven)" (*)	M. Gersmehl	Don't Wait for the Movie	4:27
4.	"Fly Eagle Fly" (*)	M. Gersmehl, B. Smiley, Gordon Kennedy	Don't Wait for the Movie	4:41
5.	"Montana Sky" (**)	M. Gersmehl, B. Smiley, G. Kennedy	Emergency Broadcast	4:55
6.	"The River Will Flow" (***)		Freedom	6:52
7.	"Desert Rose" (****)	M. Gersmehl, B. Smiley, Rick Florian	Powerhouse	4:41
8.	"A Love Calling" (****)	M. Gersmehl, B. Smiley, Mark Nemer	Powerhouse	6:24
9.	"Say the Words"		Tales of Wonder	3:57
10.	"Unchain"		Tales of Wonder	5:00
11.	"Silhouette"	M. Gersmehl, B. Smiley, Brian Wooten	Tales of Wonder	4:43
12.	"Once and for All"		Highlands	5:04
13.	"The Flame Passes On"		Highlands	4:09

Note: all tracks produced by Mark Gersmehl and Billy Smiley; (*) - produced by Smiley and White Heart; (**) - produced by White Heart; (***) - produced by Brown Bannister; (****) - produced by Bill Drescher.

== Personnel ==
On the new tracks

- Rick Florian – lead vocals, backing vocals
- Mark Gersmehl – keyboards, lead vocals, backing vocals
- Billy Smiley – acoustic guitar, backing vocals
- Brian Wooten – rhythm and lead guitars
- Mark Hill – bass guitar (tracks 1 and 2)
- Jon Knox – drums, percussion

== Charts ==
Chart (1995)	Peak position
US Top Christian Albums (Billboard)	29

=== Radio singles ===
Year	Single	Peak position
Year	Single	CCM CHR
1994–95	"My Eyes Have Seen"	2
1995	"Morningstar"	8
