= Hotline (White Heart album) =

Studio album by White Heart
- Released: 1985
- Genre: Christian rock
- Label: Home Sweet Home Records / Myrrh
- Producer: Mark Gersmehl; Billy Smiley

White Heart chronology
Vital Signs (1984)	Hotline (1985)	Don't Wait for the Movie (1986)

Hotline is the third album by the Christian rock band White Heart and the band's first with Gordon Kennedy on guitars and the last with both lead vocalist Scott Douglas and on the Home Sweet Home label. The first radio single "Jerusalem" features lead vocals from both Douglas and lead guitarist Kennedy and became a top five hit on Christian radio and was co-written with the Christian rock duo DeGarmo and Key. Hotline peaked at number 13 on the Billboard Top Inspirational Albums chart.

== Track listing ==
1. "Hotline" (Billy Smiley, Scott Douglas) – 4:14
2. "Gotta Be A Believer" (Smiley, Mark Gersmehl) – 4:21
3. "Jerusalem" (Smiley, Gersmehl, Eddie DeGarmo, Dana Key) – 3:50
4. "Turn The Page" (Smiley, Gersmehl) – 4:55
5. "She's A Runaway" (Smiley, Gersmehl) – 3:40
6. "Heroes" (Smiley, Gersmehl) – 4:36
7. "In His Name" (Gersmehl) – 4:14
8. "The Victory" (Smiley, Gersmehl, Gordon Kennedy, Larry Stewart) – 4:22
9. "Walls" (Gersmehl) – 2:35
10. "Keep Fighting The Fight" (Smiley, Gersmehl) – 3:08

== Personnel ==
White Heart

- Scott Douglas – lead vocals (1–3, 5–9)
- Mark Gersmehl – keyboards, backing vocals (1, 2, 4, 6, 9), synthesizers (2, 3, 8), lead vocals (2, 4–6, 10)
- Billy Smiley – keyboards, guitars, backing vocals (1, 2, 4, 6, 7, 9, 10)
- Gordon Kennedy – lead guitars, guitar solo (1, 5, 8, 9), backing vocals (1), lead vocals (3, 8), sitar (4)
- Gary Lunn – bass
- David Huff – drums, percussion (3, 5)

Additional musicians

- Steve Green – backing vocals (2, 4)
- David Pierce – backing vocals (6)
- Stan Armor – backing vocals (6, 9)

== Production ==
- Executive Producer – Chris Christian
- Producers – Mark Gersmehl and Billy Smiley
- Tracks 1–8 & 10 recorded by Brent King
- Track 9 recorded by Bob Graves
- Second Engineers – Sam Bailey (Tracks 1–8 & 10), David Pierce (Tracks 1–8 & 10) and Clark Schleicher (Track 9).
- Recorded at The Bennett House (Franklin, TN).
- Mixed by Brent King
- Mixed and Overdubbed at Gold Mine Studio (Nashville, TN).
- Mastered by Hank Williams at MasterMix (Nashville, TN).
- Art Direction and Design – Bill Brunt
- Photography – Mark Tucker, Ron Keith and Scott Bonner.

== Charts ==
Chart (1985)	Peak position
US Top Inspirational Albums (Billboard)	13

=== Radio singles ===
Year	Singles	Peak positions	
Year	Singles	CCM AC	CCM CHR
1985	"Jerusalem"	3	2
1986	"In His Name"	19	-—
