= Sacred Cows =

Studio album by The Swirling Eddies
- Released: 1996
- Recorded: The Green Room (Huntington Beach, California)
- Genre: Rock, Comedy
- Label: StarSong
- Producer: Camarillo Eddy

The Swirling Eddies chronology
The Berry Vest of The Swirling Eddies (1995)	Sacred Cows (1996)	The midget, the speck and the molecule (2007)

Professional ratings
Review scores
Source	Rating
Allmusic	1/5 stars

Sacred Cows, subtitled "The Songs That Helped Us," is an album featuring the rock band The Swirling Eddies, performing their own less-than-serious versions of popular CCM hits, released in 1996 on StarSong.

The basic plan for the record was to get the Eddies into a studio to record their own versions of some of the day's top CCM hits. The disc starts off with The Eddies version of the DeGarmo & Key song "God Good, Devil Bad," which finds Camarillo singing as if he's just received a severe blow to the head. Towards the end of the song, Camarillo adds his own touches to the lyrics including the lines "Knife Sharp, Spoon Dull" and "Sun Hot, Snow Cold."

Next up on the chopping block is Amy Grant's early 1990s hit "Baby Baby." The Eddies perform the song as if they are performing it during karaoke night at the local Ramada. Dc Talk's "I Luv Rap Music" sounds as though it is performed by a cheesy lounge act. In order to hit the girlishly high vocals of Stryper's "Sing A Long Song," The Eddies actually slowed the tape down and recorded the song at that speed. Then, once the tape was sped back up to the regular speed, Camarillo ends up sounding like a long lost Sweet brother on steroids.

The reaction to the album was mixed. Some fans loved it, others absolutely hated it and returned their CDs smashed into tiny pieces. Some tracks, like the Eddies cover of DC Talk's "I Luv Rap Music" found a considerable amount of radio play in various markets. Reactions from the songs' original artists were generally positive. Eddie DeGarmo commented about how he knew that D&K should never have recorded "God Good, Devil Bad". Amy Grant later referenced the album jokingly in a video tribute to Terry Taylor which was played before a Lost Dogs concert in Chatsworth, California.

== Track listing ==
1. "God Good, Devil Bad" (Words and music by DeGarmo and Key. Originally recorded by DeGarmo and Key)
2. "Baby Baby" (Words and music by Amy Grant and Keith Thomas. Originally recorded by Amy Grant)
3. "Satan, Bite the Dust" (Words by Carman, music by Keith Thomas. Originally Recorded by Carman)
4. "Not For Me" (Words by Kim Boyce, music by Jimmie Lee Sloas. Originally recorded by Kim Boyce)
5. "I Luv Rap Music" (Words and music by Toby McKeehan and Jackie Gore. Originally recorded by Dc Talk)
6. "Convertibles" (Words and music by Mark Gersmehl, Billy Smiley and Gordon Kennedy. Originally recorded by White Heart)
7. "I Use the J Word" (Words and music by DeGarmo and Key. Originally recorded by DeGarmo and Key)
8. "Alcatraz" (Words and music by Jeff Silvey and Billy Simon. Originally recorded by Al Denson)
9. "Big House" (Words and music by Mark Stuart, Barry Blair, Will McGinnis and Bob Herdman. Originally recorded by Audio Adrenaline)
10. "Sing Along Song" (Words and music by Michael Sweet. Originally recorded by Stryper)

== Personnel ==
- Camarillo Eddy on guitars and vocals.
- Michael Roe on his special, great big guitar.
- Berger Roy Al (Tim Chandler) on bass guitar.
- Prickly Disco on guitars, backing vocals and additional keyboards.
- David Raven ("Hort Elvison") on drums.

== Additional musicians ==
- Gene Pool on keyboards/guitars.
- Arthur Fhardy on keyboards.
- Spot on guitars.
- Miss Smelt Roe (no relation) for her guest vocals on "Baby, Baby."
- Alex's Evil Twin Eddy: Fish Tambourinist, Slide Whistlist and the Happy Coconuts.
- Spud Puddle, Plankeye and Disco Saint Boy: Fake Audience.
- Mr Nick Deletchi lends his velvet voice to "I Luv Rap Music," recorded live at the Ramada Motor Lodge in Ypsilanti, Michigan.
- The Swirling Eddies are pampered (literally) and managed by the infamous Mort Allen Jr.
- The Eddies would especially like to thank Ruth Buzzi

== Production notes ==
- Executive Producers: Alex MacDougall and Mark Nicholas.
- Mixed by Prickly Disco at the Green Room.
- Recorded by Prickly Disco with Camarillo Eddy.
