= Redemption (White Heart album) =

Studio album by White Heart
- Released: September 23, 1997
- Recorded: May–July 1997
- Genre: Christian rock
- Length: 46:42
- Label: Curb
- Producer: Mark Gersmehl, Billy Smiley

White Heart chronology
Inside (1995)	Redemption (1997)

Redemption is the eleventh and final studio album by the Christian rock band White Heart. It is their second and final album on Curb Records. Following the departures of lead guitarist Brian Wooten, bass guitarist John Thorn and drummer/percussionist Jon Knox and following up their 1995 album Inside, the group is now reduced to the trio of lead singer Rick Florian and White Heart founders Billy Smiley and Mark Gersmehl and has once again stylized as Whiteheart for this album. The trio has brought in studio musician friends to fill in the rhythm section and have made what critics are calling a redefining album. Redemption is produced by Smiley and Gersmehl with production assistance by Richie Biggs. The album debuted and peaked at number 33 on the Billboard Top Christian Albums chart.

== Track listing ==
All songs written by Billy Smiley and Mark Gersmehl, except where noted.

1. Looking Glass - 4:00
2. Man Overboard - 5:06
3. Honestly - 4:37
4. Steel & Stone (M. Gersmehl) - 5:28
5. The Vine - 4:07
6. Fall on Me (M. Gersmehl) - 4:43
7. Give Enough - 4:28
8. Love is Everything (M. Gersmehl) - 5:01
9. Remember This - 4:58
10. Jesus - 4:14

== Personnel ==
Whiteheart

- Rick Florian – lead and backing vocals
- Mark Gersmehl – keyboards, loops, lead and backing vocals
- Billy Smiley – acoustic guitars, electric guitars, backing vocals

Additional musicians

- Barry Graul – lead guitars, acoustic guitars, electric guitars
- Roscoe Mead – additional guitars (2, 6, 7)
- Mark Hill – bass guitar
- Mike Mead – drums
- Greg Herrington – drum programming (9)
- Steve Hindalong – percussion

== Production ==
- Claire Parr – executive producer
- Mark Gersmehl – producer
- Billy Smiley – producer
- Richie Biggs – production assistance, engineer, mixing
- Todd Gunneson – second engineer
- Greg Herrington – second engineer
- Shawn McLean – second engineer
- David Donnelly – mastering at Digital Dynamics (Los Angeles, California)
- Neuman, Walker & Associates, Inc. – art direction, design
- Sue Austin – album design coordinator
- Ben Pearson – photography
- Cindy Dupree – management
- The Bennett House, Franklin, Tennessee – recording location
- The Sound Kitchen, Franklin, Tennessee – mixing location

== Critical reception ==
Professional ratings
Review scores
Source	Rating
AllMusic	3/5 stars
Cross Rhythms	9/10 stars

Billboard magazine gave Redemption a Spotlight review saying that the album "takes an unflinching look at life and relationships but still offers hope and encouragement in some of the most moving lyrics Gersmehl and Smiley have ever written. Redemption is the central theme, but the album covers a lot of emotional territory, with Florian's evocative lead vocals bringing passion and verve to such songs as 'Man Overboard,' 'Honestly,' 'Fall on Me,' 'The Vine' and 'Jesus.' This album resonates with the wisdom gleaned from experiences the group has shared along its musical journey."

Paddy Hudspith of Cross Rhythms rated Redemption 9 out of 10 saying that the album presented "the band as a trio for the first time; songwriting founder members Mark Gersmehl (keyboards, vocals) and Billy Smiley (guitars) and long time vocalist Rick Florian are joined by session musicians on an album which successfully melds together two traditions of White Heart's distinctive sound, capturing the best of their 'Tales Of Wonder' era pop rock and developing the latter day acoustic flavourings and rawer guitar workouts. Gersmehl and Smiley are back in full production control, having learned some lessons from Ken Scott who oversaw Inside's simpler, punchier direction. Don't be fooled by the boys' radical image change, either - long hair is out; crew cuts and beards are in - but this is no desperate plot to grab a few Jars Of Clay/Third Day fans. 'Redemption' is classic White Heart and their best release for years."

== Charts ==
Chart (1997)	Peak position
US Top Christian Albums (Billboard)	33

=== Radio singles ===
Year	Singles	Peak positions	
Year	Singles	CCM AC	CCM CHR
1997	"Jesus"	-	12
1997-98	"Fall on Me"	10	14
