= Freedom (White Heart album) =

Studio album by White Heart
- Released: 1989
- Studio: The Bennett House and The Castle (Franklin, Tennessee); Digital Recorders and OmniSound Studios (Nashville, Tennessee)
- Genre: Christian rock
- Length: 52:45 (CD running time)
- Label: Sparrow
- Producer: Brown Bannister

White Heart chronology
Emergency Broadcast (1987)	Freedom (1989)	Powerhouse (1990)

Professional ratings
Review scores
Source	Rating
AllMusic	4.5/5 stars

Freedom is the sixth album by the Christian rock band White Heart and the last of the band's albums with Sparrow Records. Produced by Brown Bannister, it was also the last album for Tommy Sims, Gordon Kennedy and Chris McHugh, although McHugh returned as a session musician for Tales of Wonder (1992). With Bannister at the production helm and he is best known for producing Amy Grant's albums, he allowed the group to stretch musically and lyrically. It is considered one of White Heart's best albums in Christian rock with both Christian rock and Christian radio (AC/CHR) giving airplay on songs like "Over Me," "Invitation," "The River Will Flow," "Let the Kingdom Come" and "Eighth Wonder." Freedom peaked at number 2 on the Billboard Top Inspirational Albums chart.

== Track listing ==
1. "Bye Bye Babylon" (Rick Florian, Mark Gersmehl, Gordon Kennedy, Tommy Sims, Billy Smiley) – 4:09
2. "Sing Your Freedom" (Gersmehl, Kennedy, Sims, Smiley) – 4:53
3. "Let the Kingdom Come" (Gersmehl, Kennedy, Sims, Smiley) – 5:03
4. "Over Me" (Gersmehl, Kennedy, Sims, Smiley, Chris McHugh) – 5:15
5. "Eighth Wonder" (Florian, Gersmehl, Kennedy, McHugh, Smiley) – 4:18
6. "Power Tools" (Kennedy, McHugh, Smiley) – 4:21
7. "Invitation" (Kennedy, Sims) – 4:52
8. "The River Will Flow" (Gersmehl, Smiley) – 6:52
9. "Set The Bridge On Fire" (Florian, Gersmehl, Kennedy, Smiley) – 4:33 (CD version only)
10. "Let It Go" (Gersmehl, Kennedy, Sims, Smiley) – 4:11
11. "I'll Meet You There" (Gersmehl, Sims) – 4:18

== Critical reception ==
AllMusic's Brian Mansfield believes that White Heart "took the album's name to heart, allowing themselves more creative leeway on this than on any previous album. Most Christian arena rock sounds derivative of its secular counterparts -- not 'Freedom;' even its weak spots are undeniably original."

== Personnel ==
White Heart

- Rick Florian – lead vocals (1–7, 9–11), backing vocals (credited as Rikk Florian)
- Mark Gersmehl – keyboards, backing vocals, 1st lead vocal (3), lead vocals (8)
- Billy Smiley – guitars, backing vocals
- Gordon Kennedy – guitars, backing vocals, 2nd lead vocal (4), 3rd lead vocal (7)
- Tommy Sims – bass, backing vocals, 1st lead vocal (7)
- Chris McHugh – drums, backing vocals

Additional musicians

- Tommy Dorsey – additional keyboards (3)
- Chris Rodriguez – backing vocals (2, 3, 6)
- Stan Armor – backing vocals (8)
- Margaret Becker – backing vocals (8)
- Steven Curtis Chapman – backing vocals (8)
- Eddie DeGarmo – backing vocals (8)
- Dave Perkins – harmony vocals (8)

== Production ==
- Peter York – executive producer
- Brown Bannister – producer
- Jeff Balding – recording, mixing
- Byron House – additional engineer
- Steve Bishir – assistant engineer
- Shawn McLean – assistant engineer
- Paula Montondo – assistant engineer
- Todd Moore – assistant engineer
- Mark Nevers – assistant engineer
- Carry Summers – assistant engineer
- Kevin Twit – assistant engineer
- Bob Ludwig – mastering at Masterdisk (New York City, New York)
- Barbara Catanzaro-Hearn – art direction
- Larry Virgin – art direction, design
- Mark Tucker – photography

== Charts ==
Chart (1989)	Peak position
US Top Inspirational Albums (Billboard)	2

=== Year-end charts ===
Chart (1989)	Position
US Top Inspirational Albums (Billboard)	14

=== Radio singles ===
Year	Singles	Peak positions	
Year	Singles	CCM AC	CCM CHR
1989	"The River Will Flow"	13	1
1989	"Eighth Wonder"	18	1
1989–90	"Over Me"	—	3
1989–90	"I'll Meet You There"	32	—
