= White Heart (album) =

Studio album by White Heart
- Released: January 1982
- Studios: Gold Mine Studio and Gloser Sound Studio (Nashville, Tennessee).
- Genres: Contemporary Christian music, Christian rock
- Length: 40:22
- Label: Home Sweet Home
- Producers: Dann Huff, Billy Smiley

White Heart chronology
White Heart (1982)	Vital Signs (1984)

White Heart is the debut album by the contemporary Christian music band White Heart and the band's only album with Steve Green on lead vocals, released in 1982 on Home Sweet Home Records. A year after its release, the album peaked at number 10 on the Top Inspirational Albums chart in Billboard magazine. White Heart was nominated for a Grammy for their debut album (their first of two nominations) for Best Gospel Performance by a Duo or Group at the 26th Grammy Awards.

== Track listing ==
1. "Hold On" (Mark Gersmehl) – 3:37
2. "You're the One" (Billy Smiley, Gersmehl) – 3:56
3. "Listen to the Lonely" (Smiley, Gersmehl) – 3:47
4. "He's Returning" (Gersmehl) – 4:23
5. "Carry On" (Smiley, Gersmehl) – 3:56
6. "Guiding Light" (Smiley) – 3:40
7. "Everyday" (duet with Sandi Patty) (Smiley, Dann Huff, Gary McSpadden) – 4:08
8. "Nothing Can Take This Love" (Smiley) – 3:40
9. "Black Is White" (Smiley, McSpadden, Michael W. Smith) – 3:14
10. "Go Down Ninevah" (Smiley) – 4:30

== Personnel ==
White Heart

- Steve Green – lead vocals (1, 2, 4, 5, 6, 9, 10), backing vocals
- Mark Gersmehl – keyboards, synthesizer (4), organ (8), backing vocals
- Billy Smiley – keyboards, rhythm guitar (2, 10), backing vocals (6), lead vocals (10)
- Dann Huff – lead and rhythm guitars, backing vocals, lead vocals (1, 3, 4, 7, 8, 10)
- Gary Lunn – bass
- David Huff – drums, percussion (9, 10)

Additional Musicians

- Phil Naish – acoustic piano (7), Rhodes piano (7)
- Michael W. Smith – acoustic piano (9)
- Mark Morris – percussion (1, 3–5, 7, 8)
- Dennis Holt – percussion (8)
- Mello Mel – percussion (9)
- Sam Levine – saxophone (7)
- Sandi Patty – co-lead vocals (7)
- Greg Guidry – backing vocals (9)

Production

- Chris Christian – executive producer, mixing (1, 3–6, 8–10)
- Dann Huff – producer
- Billy Smiley – producer
- Jeff Balding – recording (1–8), mixing (1, 3–6, 8, 9, 10)
- Scott Hendricks – recording (9)
- Mike Psanos – recording (10)
- Jack Joseph Puig – mixing (2, 7), mastering at MCA Whitney Recording Studios (Los Angeles, California)
- Michael Borum – photography
- Kent Hunter – art direction, design

== Charts ==
Chart (1983)	Peak position
US Top Inspirational Albums (Billboard)	10

=== Radio singles ===
Year	Singles	Peak positions
Year	Singles	CCM AC
1983	"He's Returning"	34
1983	"Carry On"	23
