= Inside (White Heart album) =

Studio album by White Heart
- Released: 1995
- Genre: Christian rock
- Length: 48:24
- Label: Curb
- Producer: Ken Scott

White Heart chronology
Nothing But the Best: Radio Classics (1994)	Inside (1995)	Redemption (1997)

Inside is the tenth album by the Christian rock band White Heart and the band's only album with John Thorn on bass guitar and also the final album for both lead guitarist Brian Wooten and drummer Jon Knox. The band stylized its name as Whiteheart for this album. It is the first of two albums released on Curb Records. The album was produced by Ken Scott, whose producing and engineering credits include the Beatles, Elton John, Supertramp and David Bowie. Whiteheart's sound was scaled back from the arena rock from their previous releases to a more modern rock sound. Music videos were made for "Even the Hardest Heart" and "Inside".

== Track listing ==
1. "Inside" (Billy Smiley, Rick Florian) – 4:27
2. "You Can't Take What You Don't Have (You Don't Have Me)" (Smiley, Brian Wooten) – 4:56
3. "It Could Have Been You" (Smiley, Mark Gersmehl) – 3:54
4. "Come One Come All" (Gersmehl, Smiley, Wooten, Jon Knox) – 4:43
5. "Ritual" (Gersmehl, Smiley) – 5:56
6. "Living Sacrifice" (Knox, Smiley, Wooten) – 4:52
7. "Dominate" (Gersmehl) – 4:04
8. "Even the Hardest Heart" (Gersmehl, Smiley, Wooten) – 4:27
9. "Speak Softly" (Gersmehl, Smiley) – 5:06
10. "Find a Way" (Gersmehl, Smiley) – 5:54

== Personnel ==
White Heart

- Rick Florian – lead and backing vocals
- Mark Gersmehl – organ, pianos, synthesizers, lead and backing vocals
- Billy Smiley – acoustic guitar, electric guitar, backing vocals
- Brian Wooten – electric guitar, acoustic guitar, lead guitar
- John Thorn – electric bass, acoustic bass, backing vocals
- Jon Knox – drums, percussion

Additional musicians

- Bob Parr – fretless bass (9)
- Eric Darken – percussion (1–3, 5, 8)
- Steve Brewster – percussion (8)
- Claire West – backing vocals
- Mike Wilson – backing vocals

== Production ==
- Claire Parr – executive producer
- Ken Scott – producer, engineer, mixing
- Richie Biggs – assistant producer, assistant engineer
- Mark Gersmehl – assistant engineer
- Jared Johnson – assistant engineer
- Shawn McLean – assistant engineer
- Billy Smiley – assistant engineer
- Dave Donnelly – mastering
- John Scarpati – photography
- Neuman, Walker & Associates – art direction and design

Studios

- The Bennett House, Franklin, Tennessee – recording location
- Shakin' Studios, Franklin, Tennessee – recording location
- Total Access Recording, Redondo Beach, California – mixing location
- Digital Dynamics – mastering location

== Critical reception ==
Professional ratings
Review scores
Source	Rating
AllMusic	2.5/5 stars
Cross Rhythms	10/10 stars

Tony Cummings of Cross Rhythms gave Inside a perfect 10 out of 10 saying that Ken Scott's production is "state-of-the-art with the tracks having a dynamic resonance that only big studio budgets can produce while several songs are from the top drawer. The title track with screaming wah-influenced lead guitars and trippy multi-tracked vocals; a cool and subdued ballad "Speak Softly" (with vocal by keyboardist Mark Gersmehl); and "Ritual" a broody rocker with a Hammond B-3 sound and an anthemic chant of "dance, dance, dance" are all wonderful. Let's hope mainstream music giant Curb get their investment back on the lads. Either way they've helped the Nashville rockers make a cracking Christian rock album.

== Radio singles ==
Year	Single	Peak positions	
Year	Single	CCM AC	CCM CHR
1995	"Even the Hardest Heart"	21	2
1996	"It Could Have Been You"	39	5
1996	"Come One, Come All"	—	6
1996	"Find a Way"	—	20
