= Highlands (album) =

Studio album by White Heart
- Released: 1993
- Genre: Christian rock
- Length: 48:54
- Label: Star Song Records
- Producer: Billy Smiley, Mark Gersmehl

White Heart chronology
Tales of Wonder (1992)	Highlands (1993)	Nothing But the Best: Rock Classics (1994)

Professional ratings
Review scores
Source	Rating
AllMusic	4.5/5 stars
Cross Rhythms	8/10 stars

Highlands is the ninth album by the Christian rock band White Heart and the band's last album with Star Song Records. The album was released and just coming off the singles that were from their Grammy nominated album Tales of Wonder (1992) as well as touring. Highlands was produced by White Heart founders Mark Gersmehl and Billy Smiley with Darrell A. Harris as executive producer. The first radio single "Once and for All" topped the Christian CHR/Pop chart and features members of the 1990's female Christian rock group Rachel Rachel towards the end of the song. A music video was made for the album's third radio single "Heaven of My Heart". The album peaked at number 4 on the Billboard Top Christian Albums chart.

== Track listing ==
All songs written by Mark Gersmehl and Billy Smiley, except where noted.

1. "You Can See the World" – 4:21
2. "Nothing But the Best" (Sallee, Wooten, Smiley, Gersmehl) – 3:42
3. "Heaven of My Heart" – 6:11
4. "Once and for All" – 5:04
5. "Excuse Me, Forgive Me" – 4:17
6. "Change the Way" – 4:50
7. "Highland of Love" – 5:04
8. "The Cry" – 5:30
9. "Let My People Go" (Sallee, Wooten, Smiley, Gersmehl) – 5:22
10. "The Flame Passes On" – 4:09

== Personnel ==
- Rick Florian – lead vocals, backing vocals (credited as Rhic Florian)
- Mark Gersmehl – keyboards, percussion, recorder, lead vocals, backing vocals
- Billy Smiley – rhythm guitar, acoustic guitar, octave acoustic guitar, backing vocals
- Brian Wooten – rhythm and lead guitars
- Anthony Sallee – bass
- Jon Knox – drums, percussion

== Production ==
- Mark Gersmehl – producer
- Billy Smiley – producer
- Darrell A. Harris – executive producer
- Jeff Balding – recording engineer
- Richie Biggs – recording engineer, mixing
- Ronnie Brookshire – recording engineer
- Bill Deaton – recording engineer, mixing
- Lee Groitzsch – second engineer
- Patrick Kelly – second engineer
- Shawn McLean – second engineer
- Todd Robbins – second engineer
- Bob Ludwig – mastering
- Toni Thigpen – art direction
- The Riordon Design Group, Inc. – design
- Mark Tucker – photography
- Shin Sugino – photography
- The Bennett House, Franklin, Tennessee – recording location
- Quad Studios, Nashville, Tennessee – recording location
- The Boardroom, Nashville, Tennessee – recording location
- OmniSound and The Battery, Nashville, Tennessee – mixing location
- Mastered at Gateway Mastering (Portland, Maine).

== Critical reception ==
Thom Granger of AllMusic praised Highlands saying that it was "another artistic high-water mark for the band, which now includes Adam Again member John Knox on drums. The influence of '70s prog rockers like Yes and Kansas is interwoven with Celtic themes for a Christian rock classic."

David Cranson of Cross Rhythms said that "after years of personnel changes and so-so albums that languished in the shadows of Petra, three GREAT albums have emerged for White Heart, each seemingly topping the last until with last year's 'Tales Of Wonder' many critics were tossing around the phrase 'classic'. Now comes this, another superlative set of classy AOR cuts ranging from blues based rockers like 'Point Of No Return' to the haunting title track 'Highland of Love.' Lyrically White Heart are good, structurally they're repetitive. But that's a very personal view. If you have any of their previous albums, I reckon you'll like this."

== Charts ==
Chart (1993)	Peak position
US Top Christian Albums (Billboard)	4

=== Radio singles ===
Year	Singles	Peak positions	
Year	Singles	CCM AC	CCM CHR
1993	"Once and for All"	5	1
1994	"The Flame Passes On"	18	1
1994	"Heaven of My Heart"	37	1
