= Vital Signs (White Heart album) =

Studio album by White Heart
- Released: 1984
- Studios: Gold Mine Studio (Nashville, Tennessee)
- Genre: Christian rock
- Length: 39:53
- Label: Home Sweet Home / Myrrh
- Producer: White Heart

White Heart chronology
White Heart (1982)	Vital Signs (1984)	Hotline (1985)

Vital Signs is the second album by the Christian rock band White Heart and the band's first with vocalist Scott Douglas, who replaced Steve Green, released in 1984 on Home Sweet Home Records. By this time, Green had already started his solo recording career with the release of his self-titled debut album released the same year as White Heart's Vital Signs. The album features their first Christian radio number-one hit "We Are His Hands" featuring Green singing background vocals and part of the choir at the end of the song. Vital Signs peaked at number nine on the Billboard Top Inspirational Albums chart.

== Track listing ==
1. "Sing Unto the Lamb" (Billy Smiley, Dann Huff, Mark Gersmehl) – 3:15
2. "Draw the Line" (Smiley, Gersmehl, Dwight Liles) – 4:38
3. "Walking in the Light" (Smiley, Gersmehl)– 3:56
4. "Carried Away (Safe on the Wings of the Lord)" (Smiley, Gersmehl, Steve Chapman) – 4:19
5. "Quiet Love" (Smiley, Gersmehl) – 3:52
6. "Following the King" (Smiley, Gersmehl) – 4:05
7. "Let Your First Thought Be Love" (Smiley, Gersmehl, Huff)– 3:51
8. "Undercover" (Smiley, Gersmehl) – 3:54
9. "Vital Signs" (Smiley, Gersmehl, Huff, Gary Lunn) – 3:50
10. "We Are His Hands" (Gersmehl) – 4:13

== Personnel ==
White Heart

- Scott Douglas – lead vocals (1, 2, 4, 6, 9, 10), backing vocals (1, 2, 4–6)
- Mark Gersmehl – synthesizers, pianos, backing vocals (1–7, 9), lead vocals (2, 8), synth solo (6), arrangements
- Billy Smiley – pianos, acoustic guitar, backing vocals, lead vocals (9), arrangements
- Dann Huff – rhythm and lead guitars, acoustic guitar, guitar solo (2, 4, 8, 9), lead vocals (3–7), arrangements
- Gary Lunn – bass
- David Huff – drums, percussion

Additional musicians

- Phil Naish – keyboards (10)
- Dennis Holt – Simmons drums (2, 6, 8), percussion (6)
- Ronn Huff – string arrangements (5)
- The Nashville String Machine – strings (5)
- Steve Green – backing vocals (7, 10)

Choir on "We Are His Hands"

- Bob Bailey
- Scott Wesley Brown
- Gary Chapman
- Chris Christian
- Jovonne Douglas
- Scott Douglas
- Bob Farrell
- Amy Grant
- Steve Green
- David Meece
- Billy Smiley
- Debi Smiley
- Russ Taff
- Kathy Troccoli
- Tricia Walker

== Production ==
- Chris Christian – executive producer
- White Heart – producers
- Jeff Balding – recording
- Doug Sarrett – assistant engineer
- Bill Deaton – additional engineer
- Brent King – additional engineer
- Mike Psanos – additional engineer
- Jack Joseph Puig – mixing
- Doug Sax – mastering at The Mastering Lab (Los Angeles, California)
- Bill Brunt – art direction, design, cover concept
- Mark Tucker – photography, cover concept
- Kent Hunter – cover concept
- Ellen Hodnett – Vital Signs logo
- Ken Wolgemuth – Vital Signs logo

== Charts ==
Chart (1984)	Peak position
US Top Inspirational Albums (Billboard)	9

=== Radio singles ===
Year	Singles	Peak positions
Year	Singles	CCM AC
1984	"Following the King"	29
1984	"We Are His Hands"	1
