= Powerhouse (White Heart album) =

Studio album by White Heart
- Released: 1990
- Studio: The Bennett House (Franklin, Tennessee); Quad Studios and Midtown Tone & Volume (Nashville, Tennessee); Studio 55 (Los Angeles, California)
- Genre: Christian rock
- Length: 50:34
- Label: Star Song Records
- Producer: Bill Drescher

White Heart chronology
Freedom (1989)	Powerhouse (1990)	Tales of Wonder (1992)

Professional ratings
Review scores
Source	Rating
AllMusic	2/5 stars

Powerhouse is the seventh album by the Christian rock band White Heart and the first with Brian Wooten on guitars, Anthony Sallee on bass guitar and the first album on the Star Song label, and the band's only album with Mark Nemer on drums. It was released in late 1990. White Heart continues their arena rock sound from their previous album Freedom with the title song and "Independence Day" becoming hits on Christian Rock radio while their ballads like "Desert Rose" and "Lay It Down" were hits on Christian radio (AC/CHR) stations. Powerhouse peaked at number 4 on the Billboard Top Christian Albums chart.

White Heart also released a 25-minute video on VHS called Live at the Power House featuring concert footage, music videos for "Independence Day" and "Desert Rose" and interviews.

== Track listing ==
1. "Independence Day" (Smiley, Gersmehl, Florian) – 5:37
2. "Powerhouse" (Sallee, Smiley, Wooten, Gersmehl, Nemer) – 4:30
3. "Desert Rose" (Smiley, Gersmehl, Florian) – 4:41
4. "Lovers and Dreamers" (Smiley, Gersmehl, Florian, Tommy Sims) – 4:35
5. "Nailed Down" (Smiley, Wooten, Gersmehl, Dale Oliver) – 5:09
6. "Messiah" (Gersmehl) – 5:19
7. "A Love Calling" (Smiley, Gersmehl, Nemer) – 6:24
8. "Answer the Call" (Smiley, Gersmehl) – 4:44
9. "Storyline" (Smiley, Gersmehl) – 4:20
10. "Lay It Down" (Smiley, Gersmehl) – 4:57

== Personnel ==
White Heart

- Rick Florian – lead vocals, backing vocals (credited as Riq Florian)
- Mark Gersmehl – keyboards, lead vocals, backing vocals
- Billy Smiley – acoustic and rhythm guitars, backing vocals
- Brian Wooten – lead and rhythm guitars
- Anthony Sallee – bass
- Mark Nemer – drums and percussion

Additional musicians

- Carl Marsh – Fairlight percussion
- Gordon Kennedy – backing vocals
- Chris Rodriguez – backing vocals
- Marty McCall – backing vocals

== Production ==
- Darrell A. Harris – executive producer
- Bill Drescher – producer, engineer, mixing
- Mark Gersmehl – co-producer
- Billy Smiley – co-producer
- Barry Dixon – assistant engineer
- Richard Engstrom – assistant engineer
- Roy Gamble – assistant engineer
- Lee Groitzsch – assistant engineer
- Shawn McLean – assistant engineer
- Malcolm Greenwood – project coordinator, management
- Toni Thigpen – art direction
- Tufts Design Studio – design and layout
- Bob Forti – cover photography
- Mark Tucker – back cover photography

== Charts ==
Chart (1991)	Peak position
US Top Christian Albums (Billboard)	4

=== Radio singles ===
Year	Singles	Peak positions	
Year	Singles	CCM AC	CCM CHR
1991	"Desert Rose"	8	2
1991	"A Love Calling"	13	12
1991	"Lay It Down"	15	1
1992	"Storyline"	10	10
