= Tales of Wonder (album) =

Studio album by White Heart
- Released: 1992
- Studio: The Bennett House (Franklin, Tennessee); The Dugout, OmniSound Studios and Woodland (Nashville, Tennessee); Production Group (Spokane, Washington)
- Genre: Christian rock
- Length: 49:07
- Label: Star Song Records
- Producer: Mark Gersmehl: Billy Smiley

White Heart chronology
Powerhouse (1990)	Tales of Wonder (1992)	Highlands (1993)

Tales of Wonder is the eighth album by the Christian rock band White Heart and the band's first with Jon Knox as drummer. Chris McHugh played all drum tracks (except "Vendetta") although Knox was the official drummer for the tour. It is their second album on Star Song Records released in 1992. The album is produced by White Heart founders Mark Gersmehl and Billy Smiley with Brown Bannister as a production consultant and who previously worked with them on their 1989 album Freedom. Every track on Tales of Wonder charted on both Christian Rock and Radio (AC/CHR) charts, except "Morningstar" and "Gabriella." A full-length track of "Morningstar" is heard on their 1994 compilation Nothing But the Best: Radio Classics. The album peaked at number 2 on the Billboard Top Christian Albums chart. White Heart earned their second Grammy nomination, their first since 1984, for Best Rock Gospel Album for Tales of Wonder at the 35th Grammy Awards.

== Track listing ==
No.	Title	Writer(s)	Length
1.	"Raging of the Moon"	Mark Gersmehl, Billy Smiley	5:17
2.	"His Heart Was Always In It"	Gersmehl, Smiley, Brian Wooten	4:16
3.	"Unchain"	Gersmehl, Smiley	5:00
4.	"Say the Word"	Gersmehl, Smiley	3:57
5.	"Who Owns You"	Gersmehl, Smiley	4:44
6.	"Where the Thunder Roars"	Gersmehl, Smiley	4:59
7.	"Silhouette"	Gersmehl, Wooten, Smiley	4:43
8.	"Vendetta"	Gersmehl, Smiley, Anthony Sallee, Wooten	3:55
9.	"Gabriela"	Gersmehl, Smiley	4:43
10.	"Light a Candle"	Gersmehl, Smiley	6:10
11.	"Morningstar" (bonus track)	Gersmehl, Smiley, Jon Knox	1:46

== Personnel ==
White Heart

- Rick Florian – lead vocals, backing vocals (credited as Ricke Florian)
- Mark Gersmehl – keyboards, recorder, lead vocals, backing vocals
- Billy Smiley – Rickenbacker 12-string guitar, hi-string guitar, 12-string acoustic guitar, backing vocals
- Brian Wooten – lead guitar, rhythm guitar, gut-string guitar
- Anthony Sallee – bass guitar, fretless bass
- Jon Knox – drums (8)

Additional musicians

- Blair Masters – sound effects (6), synth bass (9), percussion programming (9)
- Chris McHugh – drums (1–7, 9–11)
- The "Handbell Choir" (Dave Ecrement, Mark Gersmehl and Amy Rogers) – choir (10)

== Production ==
- Darrell A. Harris – executive producer
- Mark Gersmehl – producer
- Billy Smiley – producer
- Brown Bannister – production consultant
- Ronnie Brookshire – engineer, mixing (1–6, 8, 9)
- Jeff Balding – mixing (7, 10)
- Richie Biggs – additional engineer, recording (11), mixing (11)
- Lee Groitzsch – additional engineer
- Richard Indelicato – assistant engineer
- Patrick Kelly – assistant engineer, mix assistant (1–10)
- Shawn McLean – assistant engineer
- Anthony Zecco – assistant engineer
- Daniel Johnston – mix assistant (1–6, 8, 9)
- Doug Sax – mastering at The Mastering Lab (Hollywood, California)
- Toni Thigpen – art direction, creative director
- Todd Tufts – art direction, design
- Mark Tucker – photography

== Charts ==
Chart (1992)	Peak position
US Top Christian Albums (Billboard)	2

=== Radio singles ===
Year	Singles	Peak positions	
Year	Singles	CCM AC	CCM CHR
1992	"Say The Word"	4	1
1992	"Unchain"	13	2
1993	"Light a Candle"	—	2
1993	"Silhouette"	16	1
1993	"Where the Thunder Roars"	—	3
