= Don't Wait for the Movie =

Studio album by White Heart
- Released: 1986
- Studio: Center Stage Studios and MasterMix (Nashville, Tennessee)
- Genre: Christian rock
- Length: 45:48
- Label: Sparrow Records
- Producer: Billy Smiley; White Heart

White Heart chronology
| Hotline (1985) | Don't Wait for the Movie (1986) | Emergency Broadcast (1987) |

Professional ratings
Review scores
| Source | Rating |
|---|---|
| AllMusic | 3/5 stars |
| Cross Rhythms | 8/10 stars |

Don't Wait for the Movie is the fourth album by the Christian rock band White Heart and the band's first album with vocalist Rick Florian and drummer Chris McHugh. It is also their first album on Sparrow Records. Bassist Gary Lunn would leave the group after the release of the album and was replaced on tour by bass guitar player and musician Tommy Sims. Sims would be a featured member and musician on their next album. Don't Wait for the Movie became a very successful album with radio singles "How Many Times (Seventy Times Seven)" and "Fly Eagle Fly" both topping the Christian radio charts while "Beat of a Different Drum" and "Dr. Jekyll and Mr. Christian" were hits on Christian Rock radio stations and programs. CCM Magazine named this album as one of the 100 Greatest Albums in Christian Music at number 74. Don't Wait for the Movie peaked at number 11 on the Billboard Top Inspirational Albums chart. White Heart was nominated for Group of the Year at the 18th GMA Dove Awards but lost to First Call. The album cover did win a Dove Award for Recorded Music Packaging given to Mark Tucker and Buddy Jackson for photography and art direction.

White Heart also released a companion video called Don't Wait for the Movie: The Live Video Album on VHS featuring all songs on the album except "King George."

== Track listing ==
1. "Read the Book (Don't Wait for the Movie)" (Smiley, Kennedy, Mo West) – 4:51
2. "Holy Ground" (Smiley, Kennedy, Gersmehl) – 4:42
3. "Beat of a Different Drum" (Smiley, Kennedy, McHugh, Gersmehl) – 4:17
4. "Fly Eagle Fly" (Smiley, Kennedy, Gersmehl) – 4:41
5. "Convertibles" (Smiley, Kennedy, Gersmehl) – 3:43
6. "Let the Children Play (Instrumental)" (Kennedy, Larry Stewart) – 1:32
7. "King George" (Smiley, Kennedy, Gersmehl) – 4:20
8. "No Apology" (Smiley, Kennedy, Gersmehl) – 4:22
9. "Maybe Today" (Smiley, Kennedy, Gersmehl) – 4:25
10. "Dr. Jekyll and Mr. Christian" (Smiley, Kennedy, Gersmehl) – 4:34
11. "How Many Times (Seventy Times Seven)" (Gersmehl) – 4:27

== Critical reception ==
Evan Cater of AllMusic said Don't Wait for the Movie's "songs are founded on some thuddingly obvious lyrical conceit. The too-clever title track, 'Read the Book (Don't Wait for the Movie),' sets the tone with its criticism of modern media-obsessed culture: "I asked them if they knew Jesus/'Is He in a theater near you?'/I said, 'no, He's the Messiah'/'Do you think He'll get good reviews?'" Another blatant gimmick is used on 'Convertibles,' which makes the theologically questionable assertion that "God made convertibles." (No, it's not meant metaphorically.) 'King George' takes a similar approach in suggesting that Americans are giving up the religious freedoms earned in the Revolutionary War: "Now we're so free, but tell me what's our freedom for/If we say His name, if our message gets too strong/the radio will never play this song." Of course, White Heart's beef doesn't make a lot of sense. The reason explicitly Christian music is rarely heard on mainstream radio is not because of any restriction of religious freedom, but because a large percentage of the mainstream audience is not devoutly Christian. The founding fathers never promised that freedom of worship would ensure popular acceptance of Christian beliefs."

Over at Cross Rhythms, Mike Rimmer gave the album 8 out of 10 saying "the new line up managed a more sophisticated sound with this release, combing some slightly edgier rock tunes with some smooth '80s rock ballads. It's all very AOR but there's plenty to enjoy like the driving rock of 'Holy Ground,' 'Read The Book' and 'Dr. Jekyll And Mr. Christian.' There's some good '80s pop as evidenced by 'No Apology' and on the ballad, 'Fly Eagle Fly.' Modern rock this isn't but if you were there, it's likely you look back on this album with a certain amount of nostalgia. It's the sound of a CCM band rising to new heights."

== Personnel ==
White Heart

- Rick Florian – lead vocals (credited as Ric Florian)
- Mark Gersmehl – keyboards, trombone, vocals
- Billy Smiley – keyboards, guitars, trumpet, vocals
- Gordon Kennedy – lead guitars, sitar, vocals
- Gary Lunn – bass guitar, LinnDrum programming
- Chris McHugh – drums, percussion

Additional musicians

- Tommy Greer – keyboard programming
- Farrell Morris – percussion on "Read the Book (Don't Wait for the Movie)"

Production

- Billy Smiley – producer, editing
- White Heart – producers
- Brent King – engineer, mixing
- David Pierce – second engineer
- Ken Love – editing
- Hank Williams – mastering
- Buddy Jackson – art direction
- Mike Drake – artwork
- Jim Shanman – design
- Mark Tucker – photography

== Charts ==
| Chart (1986) | Peak position |
|---|---|
| US Top Inspirational Albums (Billboard) | 11 |

=== Radio singles ===
| Year | Singles | Peak positions | |
| Year | Singles | CCM AC | CCM CHR |
|---|---|---|---|
| 1986 | "How Many Times (Seventy Times Seven)" | 1 | 2 |
| 1986 | "Convertibles" | — | 20 |
| 1986–87 | "Fly Eagle Fly" | 1 | 2 |
| 1987 | "Maybe Today" | 3 | 1 |

== Accolades ==
GMA Dove Awards

| Year | Winner | Category |
|---|---|---|
| 1987 | Don't Wait for the Movie | Recorded Music Packaging of the Year |
