= Nothing but the Best =

Nothing But the Best may refer to:

- Nothing but the Best (film), a 1964 British comedy film directed by Clive Donner
- Nothing but the Best (album), a 2008 compilation album by Frank Sinatra
- "Nothing but the Best", a 1961 song by Frank Sinatra
- "Nothing but The Best", a song by Deana Martin on her 2013 album Destination Moon
- "Nothing but the Best", a single by Ian Gillan
- Nothing But the Best: Radio Classics, an album by White Heart
- Nothing But the Best: Rock Classics, an album by White Heart
