= Brynn Gersmehl =

American singer-songwriter

- Born: Brynn Beltran
- Origin: Los Angeles, California
- Genres: CCM, Christian rock, pop rock, AOR
- Occupations: Keyboardist, songwriter, author
- Instruments: Keyboards, guitar, vocals
- Years active: 1990–1994
- Formerly of: Rachel Rachel

Brynn Gersmehl (née Beltran) is an American Christian musician from southern California who writes in the Contemporary Christian genre. She is best known for her involvement in the AOR group Rachel Rachel, the first all-female Christian rock band, with whom she wrote and performed two No. 1 songs. She currently lives with her husband Mark Gersmehl, a member of the rock band White Heart, and their son in Nashville, Tennessee.

== Early life ==
Beltran was born in California, and grew up as a "valley girl" in the state's San Fernando Valley. As a child she played acoustic guitar and piano, but by the time she was in her teens, she lost her enjoyment of music, and instead started hanging out with a "stoner crowd" of friends. This led to a life of drugs and an addiction to cocaine.

As Beltran reached her mid-20s, she began an unsuccessful move to quit her addiction. Not long afterwards, she got divorced. Then one day, her sister had invited her to a "new" kind of church; one that was different from the church their mother had taken them to as children. On her first visit to the "new" church, Beltran accepted Christ and sought afterwards to become a devout follower. However, even after her conversion Beltran continued to struggle with her addiction to the point where she claims to have recovered.

== Rachel Rachel ==
In the early 1990s, Beltran was "discovered by" Jennifer York, who at the time was looking for female Christian musicians to play in the group she was forming, Rachel Rachel, which would become the "first American all-girl Christian rock band". "Putting her childhood musical skills to good use", Beltran signed on to play keyboards and sing lead and back-up vocals. Also, ever since her conversion, she had found herself writing songs about her risen Lord. She would write or co-write nearly half of the group's songs, including their two No. 1 hits "Only Heaven Knows" and "You'll Never Know".

Rachel Rachel released two albums, Way to My Heart (1991) and You Oughta Know by Now (1993). On both of these albums Beltran played keyboards and sang lead and backup vocals, including sharing the lead vocals on the group's No. 1 hit "Only Heaven Knows" with lead singer Cheryl Jewell. The group would record and tour until it disbanded in 1994.

== Family life ==
In 1993, while on a 7-month tour with the rock band White Heart, Beltran met Mark "Gersh" Gersmehl, keyboard player for the band. This relationship grew until, after the tour was over, Gersh asked Beltran to marry him. They married in 1994.

The Gershmels currently live in Nashville with their son, Trevor, writing, singing, recording, and teaching worship seminars together. She plays the acoustic guitar with her husband, homeschools her son, and enjoys cooking, collecting coupons, and using power tools.

== Discography ==
With Rachel Rachel

- Way to My Heart (1991)
- You Oughta Know by Now (1993)
