= Emergency Broadcast =

Studio album by White Heart
- Released: 1987
- Studio: Center Stage Studios, OmniSound Studios and Sixteenth Avenue Sound (Nashville, Tennessee)
- Genre: Christian rock
- Length: 42:50
- Label: Sparrow Records
- Producer: White Heart

White Heart chronology
Don't Wait for the Movie (1986)	Emergency Broadcast (1987)	Freedom (1989)

Emergency Broadcast is the fifth album by the Christian rock band White Heart and the band's first with bass guitarist Tommy Sims and is the second album on the Sparrow Records label released in late 1987. The album track "No Taboo" features the vocals of Rick Florian, Mark Gersmehl, Gordon Kennedy and Sims. The album was produced by White Heart, with the executive producer being Randy Moore. Emergency Broadcast peaked at number 6 on the Billboard Top Inspirational Albums chart.

== Track listing ==
1. "Urban Renewal" (Mark Gersmehl, Billy Smiley) – 4:02
2. "Key to Our Survival" (Gordon Kennedy, Tommy Sims) – 4:19
3. "No Taboo" (Gersmehl, Smiley, Rick Florian) – 4:46
4. "Montana Sky" (Gersmehl, Kennedy, Smiley) – 4:55
5. "Fashion Fades" (Gersmehl, Kennedy, Smiley) – 4:19
6. "More Sold Out" (Kennedy, Smiley) – 4:41
7. "Somewhere in Between" (Gersmehl, Smiley) – 4:04
8. "Speed of Sound" (Kennedy) – 3:03
9. "Lone Ranger" (Sims, Smiley) – 4:07
10. "Edge of the Dream" (Gersmehl) – 4:34

== Personnel ==
White Heart

- Rick Florian – lead vocals (1–3, 5–9), backing vocals
- Mark Gersmehl – keyboards, backing vocals, additional lead vocals (3), lead vocals (10)
- Gordon Kennedy – lead and rhythm guitars, backing vocals, additional lead vocals (3), lead vocals (4)
- Billy Smiley – rhythm guitar (1), backing vocals
- Tommy Sims – bass guitar, synthesizer bass, keyboards, backing vocals, additional lead vocals (3, 9)
- Chris McHugh – drums, percussion

Additional musicians

- Carl Marsh – Fairlight programming (3, 4, 9)
- David Mullen – backing vocals (1, 3)

== Production ==
- Randy Moore – executive producer
- White Heart – producers, arrangements
- Scott Hendricks – vocal production assistant, vocal engineer
- Jeff Balding – recording, mixing
- Bill Deaton – engineer (guitar overdubs)
- Bill Whittington – engineer (keyboard overdubs)
- Danny Johnson – second engineer
- Jeanne Kinney – second engineer
- Dave Parker – second engineer
- Brent King – additional engineer
- Denny Purcell – mastering at Georgetown Masters (Nashville, Tennessee)
- Barbara Catanzaro-Hearn – art direction
- Steven A. Heller – cover photography
- 5 Penguins Design – design
- Ron Mazellan – illustration

== Charts ==
Chart (1988)	Peak position
US Top Inspirational Albums (Billboard)	6

=== Radio singles ===
Year	Singles	Peak positions	
Year	Singles	CCM AC	CCM CHR
1987–88	"Montana Sky"	3	3
1988	"Edge of the Dream"	13	7
1988	"Somewhere in Between"	24	—
