= Chuckwagon (disambiguation) =

A chuckwagon is a type of field kitchen covered wagon historically used in the United States and Canada.

Chuckwagon or chuck wagon may also refer to:

- Chuck Wagon (dog food), a product of Nestlé Purina PetCare
- Chuckwagon, nickname for the U.S. Military Material Identification Division
- Chuckwagon, a slang term for a food truck
- Chuckwagon racing, an equestrian rodeo sport

== Music ==
- Chuck Wagon (musician) (1956–1981; born Robert Davis), American punk rock musician
- Chuck Wagon & the Wheels, an American country music group, circa 2000
- The Chuck Wagon Gang, an American country gospel musical group formed in 1935
