= Rachel Rachel =

Rachel Rachel may refer to:

- Rachel, Rachel, a 1968 American film
- Rachel, Rachel (All Grown Up!), an episode of All Grown Up!
- Rachel Rachel (band), a musical group active in the early 1990s
