= 18th GMA Dove Awards =

1987 US music awards ceremony

- Date: April 9, 1987
- Location: Nashville, Tennessee

The 18th Annual GMA Dove Awards were held on 1987 recognizing accomplishments of musicians for the year 1986. The show was held in Nashville, Tennessee.

== Award recipients ==
- Song of the Year
  - "How Excellent Is Thy Name"; Dick and Melodie Tunney, Paul Smith; Word Music, Marquis III; Laurel Press, Pamela Kay Music (ASCAP)
- Songwriter of the Year
  - Dick & Melodie Tunney
- Male Vocalist of the Year
  - Steve Green
- Female Vocalist of the Year
  - Sandi Patti
- Group of the Year
  - First Call
- Artist of the Year
  - Sandi Patti
- New Artist of the Year (originally named Horizon Award)
  - First Call
- Southern Gospel Album of the Year
  - The Master Builder; The Cathedrals; Bill Gaither, Gary McSpadden; RiverSong
- Inspirational Album of the Year
  - Morning Like This; Sandi Patty; Greg Nelson, Sandi Patty; Word Records
- Pop/Contemporary Album of the Year
  - The Big Picture; Michael W. Smith; Michael W. Smith, John Potoker; Reunion Records
- Contemporary Gospel Album of the Year
  - Heart & Soul; The Clark Sisters; Norbert Putnam, Twinkie Clark; Rejoice
- Traditional Gospel Album of the Year
  - Christmasing; Shirley Caesar; Norbert Putnam; Rejoice
- Instrumental Album of the Year
  - Instrument Of Praise; Phil Driscoll; Lari Goss, Phil Driscoll, Ken Pennel; Benson
- Praise and Worship Album of the Year
  - Hymns; 2nd Chapter of Acts; Buck Herring; Live Oak
- Children's Music Album of the Year
  - God Likes Kids; Joel and Labreeska Hemphill; Benson
- Musical Album of the Year
  - A Mighty Fortress; Steve Green, Dwight Liles, Niles Borop; Sparrow
- Short Form Music Video of the Year
  - "Famine In Their Land"; The Nelons; Robert Deaton, George Flanigen, directors; Word
- Long Form Music Video of the Year
  - Limelight; Steve Taylor; John Anneman, Steve Taylor, directors; Sparrow
- Recorded Music Packaging of the Year
  - Mark Tucker, Buddy Jackson Don't Wait for the Movie; Whiteheart
