= Cotton, Lloyd and Christian =

Australian rock band

Cotton, Lloyd and Christian were a soft rock trio comprising singer-songwriters Darryl Cotton from Australia, and Michael Lloyd and Chris Christian from the United States. They achieved some success in the mid-1970s.

== History ==
American multi-instrumentalist, singer and songwriter Michael Lloyd, who had been a member of psychedelic rock band The West Coast Pop Art Experimental Band when a teenager in the mid and late 1960s, was in 1970 appointed vice-president responsible for A&R at MGM Records by his mentor Mike Curb. Lloyd continued to work as a record producer, notably with The Osmonds, but also maintained a career as a performer. In 1973 he formed a recording and songwriting trio, Friends, with Darryl Cotton and Steve Kipner. Darryl Cotton had been a member of Zoot, who had several hit singles in Australia between 1969 and 1971. After the band split up, he travelled to the UK in 1972, and then to the US. Kipner was an American-born Australian, formerly a member of Steve & the Board and British-based band Tin Tin, who had a hit in the US in 1971 with "Toast and Marmalade for Tea". The album Friends was released on the MGM label. Most of the songs were written by Cotton, Lloyd and Kipner, apart from the single, "Gonna Have a Good Time", which was a cover of The Easybeats' song "Good Times". The album was produced by Lloyd.

Friends dissolved shortly afterwards, and Kipner formed a new group, Skyband. Lloyd and Cotton left MGM when Curb also left to establish his own production company. The pair recruited Texan-born Chris Christian, and in 1975 the trio recorded their first album, Cotton, Lloyd & Christian, issued by 20th Century Records. Their version of the Del Shannon song "I Go to Pieces" - a 1965 hit for Peter and Gordon - became a #66 hit on the Billboard Hot 100 and #10 on the Easy Listening chart. Other tracks included a slowed-down version of the Supremes' hit "Baby Love"; a medley of songs from the Who's Tommy; and "I Don't Know Why You Love Me". The album was repackaged by Curb and Lloyd in 1976, and used as the music soundtrack of a movie, The Pom Pom Girls. The trio's second album, Number Two, also appeared in 1976, and in April 1977 they released another single, "Crying in the Rain", written by Carole King and Howie Greenfield and first recorded by the Everly Brothers. Both albums were produced by Lloyd and Curb. No further recordings by the trio were released.

Lloyd continued to work in Los Angeles, and produced hit records by Shaun Cassidy and Leif Garrett, as well as the soundtrack to Dirty Dancing. Cotton continued as a songwriter and performer, returning to Australia in 1978; he died in 2012. Christian also continued to work successfully as a songwriter and record producer, with Amy Grant and others.

== Discography ==
=== Albums ===
List of albums, with details
| Title | details |
|---|---|
| Cotton, Lloyd & Christian | Released: 1975; Format: LP; Label: 20th Century Records (L 35664) |
| Number Two | Released: 1976; Format: LP; Label: 20th Century Records (L 36055) |
