= Larysa Jaye =

American singer-songwriter (1984–2024)

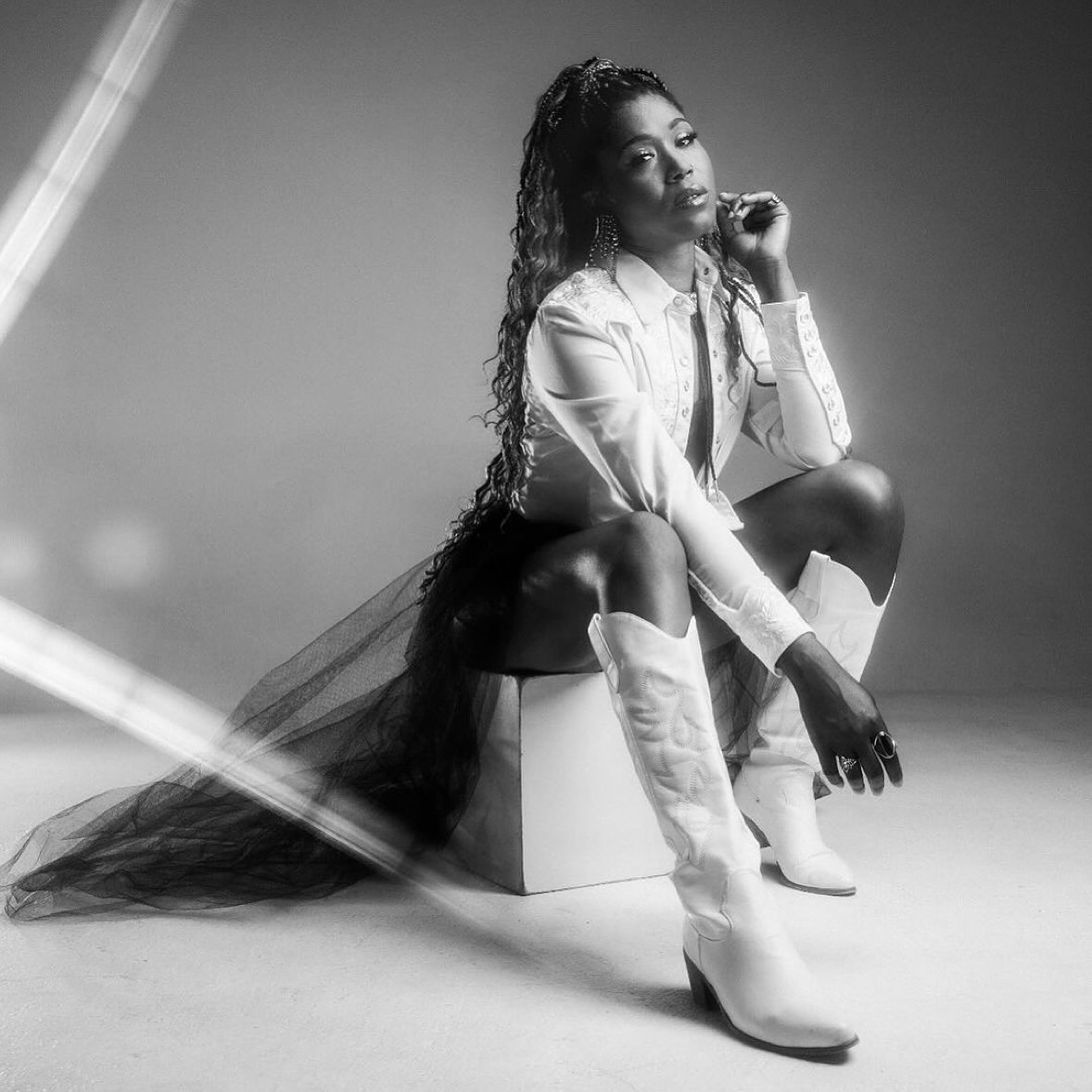

Background information
- Born: Larysa Ann Hamilton Jackson; October 21, 1984; Kansas City, Kansas, U.S.
- Died: December 8, 2024 (aged 40) Clarksville, Tennessee, U.S.
- Genres: Acoustic rock; Country; Soul
- Occupations: Singer-songwriter, musician
- Years active: 2000s–2024
- Labels: Larysa Jaye Music, C.M. Jaye Music (posthumous)

Larysa Ann Hamilton Jackson (October 21, 1984 – December 8, 2024), professionally known as Larysa Jaye, was an American singer-songwriter who blended acoustic soul, country, and rock. Based in Nashville, Tennessee, she earned recognition for her storytelling lyrics and for breaking barriers as a Black woman in country and Americana music.

== Early life and education ==
Larysa Jaye was born on October 21, 1984, in Kansas City, Kansas, to Pastor Wendell Hamilton and Sharon Hamilton. She began singing in her father's church choir at a young age and learned to play guitar at age 16. Her family relocated several times throughout her youth—moving from Kansas City to Smyrna, Tennessee, then to Blue Springs, Missouri, and finally to Nashville, Tennessee. These transitions exposed her to a variety of regional musical influences that later shaped her sound and style.

== Career ==
Larysa Jaye began performing publicly in the early 2000s, gaining experience in Nashville open mic scenes such as Lovenoise and eventually becoming known for blending country and Americana influences with her personal songwriting style.

Her artistic journey and early influences were profiled in a 2022 feature by Nashville Voyager, where she reflected on her growth as a writer, mother, and independent artist.

She released several independent singles, including Nobody Wanna Hear It, Just Like That, The Thoughts That Happen (Mama’s Song), and I Don’t Do Love. Her 2023 single The Thoughts That Happen (Mama’s Song) was featured on Today in Nashville, Local on 2, and WSM's Country & Cody.

Jaye was known for her live performances at notable Nashville venues, including The 5 Spot and 3rd & Lindsley, and she maintained a weekly residency at the Twelve Thirty Club, making her one of the only Black female artists with a standing gig on Lower Broadway. She also regularly performed at Nashville International Airport (BNA), entertaining travelers with live sets.

Her biggest live audience came in 2024, when she sang the national anthem and performed for a crowd of over 30,000 at a Nashville SC Major League Soccer match at Geodis Park.

In addition to her solo career, Jaye collaborated with artists such as Carrie Underwood, Lauren Daigle, Danny Gokey, and Kevin Max, lending backing vocals and support across multiple genres.

In 2021, Larysa Jaye collaborated with music producer and songwriter Billy Smiley, a founding member of the Christian rock band White Heart. Together, they produced tracks including Birmingham (Side by Side) and No Other Face. Birmingham (Side by Side), released through Southern Skye Records, pays homage to the civil rights movement.

She was also selected for the inaugural class of the Academy of Country Music's OnRamp program in 2023, which mentors diverse emerging artists and connects them with industry professionals. The program supported her efforts to expand her audience beyond Nashville and grow her presence in country and Americana music. NPR included her in the 2023 pictorial "Meet The Emerging Americana Stars Of The Black Opry Revue." She was also described as an emerging artist by the National Museum of African American Music.

Jaye received multiple nominations at the Nashville Independent Music Awards and was honored with the Key to the City of Sikeston, Missouri, in recognition of her philanthropic work.

In 2024, Larysa Jaye founded her own independent record label, Larysa Jaye Music LLC, to manage her music releases and maintain creative control.

== Legacy and death ==
On December 8, 2024, Larysa Jaye died at the age of 40 in a single-vehicle accident on Interstate 24 in Montgomery County, Tennessee. She had four children.

In the months following her death, her family and collaborators sought to preserve her legacy. On April 18, 2025, a posthumous single titled "No Other Face (Like Mine)" was released under C.M. Jaye Music, a label founded by her brother, author and entrepreneur C.M. James. The single was promoted as part of an upcoming EP celebrating her music and message of individuality.

The Academy of Country Music released a tribute acknowledging Jaye's selection as part of the inaugural ACM OnRamp class in 2023. The organization highlighted her artistic growth and community impact through a public statement and memorial content shared across ACM platforms.

In addition, her label announced the formation of "Larysa Jaye Writes," an initiative aimed at supporting songwriters and creative artists in developing their voice and story through music.

== Discography ==
=== Singles ===
- "Nobody Wanna Hear It" – Independent release (2022)
- "Just Like That" – Independent release (2022)
- "The Thoughts That Happen (Mama’s Song)" – Independent release (2023)
- "Birmingham (Side by Side)" – Independent release (2023)
- "I Don’t Do Love" – Independent release (September 13, 2024)
- "No Other Face (Like Mine)" – Official posthumous single released under C.M. Jaye Music (April 18, 2025)
