= The Swirling Eddies =

American rock band

- Origin: California, U.S.
- Genres: Rock
- Years active: 1988–present
- Labels: Frontline, Stunt
- Members: Terry Scott Taylor; Tim Chandler; Judy Ism; Derri Daugherty; Greg Flesch; Rob Watson; Jerry Chamberlain; David Raven; Gene Eugene

The Swirling Eddies are an American rock band that began as an anonymous spinoff from the band Daniel Amos, along with new drummer David Raven.

== Career ==
For each Swirling Eddies release, band members adopted pseudonyms for the liner notes; "Camarillo Eddy" (Terry Scott Taylor), "Berger Roy Al" (Tim Chandler), "Gene Pool" (Greg Flesch), "Arthur Fhardy" (Rob Watson), "Spot" (Jerry Chamberlain), and "Hort Elvison" (David Raven). These pseudonyms were dropped for their third album, "Zoom Daddy". Over the years new Eddies appeared on the band's albums including "Prickly Disco" (Gene Eugene), Picky Swelly, Newt York Newt York, Derry Air (Derri Daugherty), and Judy Ism. "Guest Eddies," a term used for musicians that contributed musically to one of the band's projects also made appearances on nearly every album. The list of "Guest Eddies" includes Buckeye Jazzbo, Miracle Babe, Mary Baker Eddy, Jeb McSwaggart (Ed McTaggart), Mike Roe, and Eddie DeGarmo. As early as 1991, Taylor saw the Eddies as an ever-evolving and ever-growing family of like-minded musicians. At that time, in an interview with Harvest Rock Syndicate, Taylor explained that the plan was to "(open) the Eddies up to even more artists, sort of make the Eddies this conglomerate of different people that I've always wanted to work with, and have a lot of song-writing teams involved and different lead singers. Just make it this mass of people, that sort of fluctuates and changes."

The band released its debut album on Alarma Records in 1988 entitled Let's Spin!. Outdoor Elvis, released in 1989, featured the band's first two radio singles, "Driving in England" and "Hide the Beer, the Pastor's Here!". The title track included lines such as: "It's said he croons when the moon's above, singing tenderly 'Hunk of Burning Love.'" The band's humorous "documentary" video, Spittle and Phlegm, was released the following year.

In 2004, the band began to work on their first album of original, new material in ten years entitled The midget, the speck and the molecule. The recording sessions ended in May 2007 and the album was released on July 23, 2007.

Tim Chandler died on October 8, 2018.

== Discography ==
=== Albums ===
- Let's Spin!, 1988 album
- Outdoor Elvis, 1989 album
- Zoom Daddy, 1994 album
- The Berry Vest of The Swirling Eddies, Best of album featured a bonus track on the tape version reversing the usual convention of the time of only putting bonus tracks on the CD, 1995 Compilation
- Sacred Cows, 1996 album
- The midget, the speck and the molecule, 2007 album

=== Special and limited editions ===
- Swirling Mellow, Released numerous times between 1988 and 2008

== Videography ==
- Spittle & Phlegm, 1990 VHS documentary
- Spittle and Phlegm, 2002 DVD documentary (Reissue)
