= Let's Spin! =

Studio album by the Swirling Eddies
- Released: 1988
- Recorded: Asylomar Studios, Costa Mesa, California
- Genre: Rock
- Label: Alarma
- Producer: Camarillo Eddy

The Swirling Eddies chronology
Let's Spin! (1988)	Outdoor Elvis (1989)

Professional ratings
Review scores
Source	Rating
AllMusic	4/5 stars

Let's Spin! is the debut album by rock band the Swirling Eddies. It was released in 1988 on Alarma Records.

Although the true identities of the Swirling Eddies were later revealed, it remained a complete mystery for most people at the time of this album's release. Frontline Records helped to launch the Swirling Eddies debut release with a "Guess the Eddies" contest. Fliers and magazine advertisements were distributed that included clues as to the identities of the Eddies. Contest participants were able to submit their own lists of who they thought the Eddies might be.

== Track listing ==
Side one

1. "Let's Spin!" - 4:12 (Camarillo Eddy)
2. "Catch That Angel" - 4:19 (Eddy)
3. "The Unsuccessful Dutch Missionary" - 0:08 (Eddy)
4. "The Big Guns" - 4:35 (Eddy)
5. "Rodeo Drive" - 4:27 (Eddy)
6. "Ed Takes a Vacation (A Suite)" - 5:50 (Lyrics: Eddy; music: Eddy, Gene Pool, Berger Roy Al)

Side two

1. "Snowball" - 4:13 (Eddy, Pool, Roy Al, Hort Elvison)
2. "I've Got an Idea" - 4:10 (Eddy)
3. "Don't Ask Me How I Feel" - 6:27 (Eddy)
4. "Ed Again" - 0:35 (Eddy)
5. "What a World, What a World" - 5:05 (Eddy)

== Personnel ==
- Camarillo Eddy: rhythm guitar, vocals.
- Gene Pool: lead guitar, keyboards.
- Arthur Fhardy: keyboards.
- Spot: guitars.
- Berger Roy Al: bass guitar.
- Hort Elvison: drums.

Additional musicians

- Jany Macklebee: backing vocal, spoken word on "Snowball".
- Buckeye Jazzbo: horn.
- Horns performed by the Horns O' Plenty under the direction of Buckeye Jazzbo.

Production notes

- Engineered by Doug Doyle.
- Mixed by Camarillo Eddy and Doug Doyle.
- Recorded and Mixed at Asylomar Studios, Costa Mesa, California.
- Art Direction and Design by Jeb McSwaggart.
