= The Berry Vest of The Swirling Eddies =

The Berry Vest of...

Compilation album by The Swirling Eddies
- Released: 1995
- Recorded: Asylomar Studios (Costa Mesa, California); The Mixing Lab A & B (Los Angeles, California); The Green Room (Huntington Beach, California)
- Genre: Rock
- Label: Alarma Records
- Producer: Camarillo Eddy

The Swirling Eddies chronology
Zoom Daddy (1994)	The Berry Vest of... (1995)	Sacred Cows (1996)

The Berry Vest of The Swirling Eddies is the title of compilation album featuring music by the rock band The Swirling Eddies, released in 1995 on Alarma Records.

In an unusual twist, the cassette version of this "best of" compilation included a bonus track not found on the CD entitled "Wacky Fan Letter." The track featured Camarillo Eddy reading an actual letter from a fan in which the writer harshly criticized the band's albums.

== Track listing ==
1. "(Disco) Love Grapes" (Words and music by Terry Taylor, David Raven and Tim Chandler)
2. "Driving In England" (Words and music by Camarillo Eddy)
3. "The Golden Girl of the Golden West" (Words and music by Terry Taylor, David Raven, Tim Chandler and Jerry Chamberlain)
4. "What A World, What A World" (Words and music by Camarillo Eddy)
5. "I've Got An Idea" (Words and music by Camarillo Eddy)
6. "Pyro Sets A Wildfire" (Words and music by Terry Taylor, David Raven and Tim Chandler)
7. "Outdoor Elvis" (Words and music by Camarillo Eddy)
8. "Strange Days" (Words and music by Camarillo Eddy)
9. "Let's Spin!" (Words and music by Camarillo Eddy)
10. "Arthur Fhardy's Yodeling Party" (Words and music by Camarillo Eddy, Spot, Arthur Fhardy)
11. "Hide the Beer, The Pastor's Here" (Words and music by Camarillo Eddy)
12. "Billy Graham" (Words and music by Camarillo Eddy)
13. "Catch That Angel" (Words and music by Camarillo Eddy)
14. "The Unsuccessful Dutch Missionary" (Words and music by Camarillo Eddy)
15. "The Big Guns" (Words and music by Camarillo Eddy)
16. "Like Lazarus" (Bonus Eddie)
17. "The Twist" (Words and music by Terry Taylor, David Raven, Tim Chandler and Jerry Chamberlain)
18. "With The Tired Eyes Of Faith" (Bonus Eddie - Camarillo Unplugged)
19. "Glorious Dregs" (Bonus Eddie - Camarillo Unplugged)

== Personnel ==
- Camarillo Eddy on guitars and vocals.
- Gene Pool on lead guitars, keyboards.
- Arthur Fhardy on keyboards.
- Spot on guitars.
- Berger Roy Al on bass guitar.
- Prickly Disco on guitars, backing vocals and additional keyboards.
- David Raven ("Hort Elvison") on drums.

== Additional musicians ==
- Miracle Babe sings backing vocals.
- Jeb McSwaggart plays percussion.
- Horns provided by the Horns O' Plenty under the direction of Buckeye Jazzbo.
