= Chris Christian =

American songwriter, record producer, and record label executive (born 1951)

- Born: Lon Christian Smith; February 7, 1951 (age 75); Abilene, Texas, U.S.
- Genres: Pop, contemporary Christian music
- Occupations: Recording artist-songwriter, record producer, sports owner, author
- Label: YMC/Home Sweet Home
- Formerly of: Cotton, Lloyd and Christian
- Website: chrischristianmusic.com

Chris Christian (born Lon Christian Smith on February 7, 1951) is an American songwriter, record producer, and a record label executive. His songs have been recorded by Elvis Presley, Olivia Newton-John, Hall and Oates, Natalie Cole, Sheena Easton, The Pointer Sisters, Al Jarreau, The Carpenters, Amy Grant, Patti Austin, Dionne Warwick, America, the Imperials, B.J. Thomas, B W Stevenson, Marilyn McCoo, Dan Peek, Cheryl Ladd, Jane Olivor, Sandi Patti, Pat Boone, Ali Lohan, Donny Osmond, and others.

Christian has produced albums that have been nominated for nine and won four Grammy Awards. He has also been nominated for seven Gospel Music Association Dove Awards as an artist, songwriter, and producer, winning five. He has also released sixteen other albums as a solo artist.

Throughout his career, he has written music for many major TV sports events such as the Super Bowl, NCAA finals, The Masters, Olympics, NFL Today, US Open, and many more.

== Biography ==
As a member of the trio of Cotton, Lloyd & Christian, put together by Mike Curb in the early 1970s, he enjoyed two hits on the Billboard adult contemporary chart on 20th Century Records. The group performed on Dick Clark's American Bandstand and Midnight Special. As a solo artist he performed on The Merv Griffin Show, Solid Gold, and was a judge on Star Search. Christian also played guitar with Chet Atkins, Jerry Reed, and the Wayne Newton band.

As a record producer, he is best known for starting Amy Grant's music career by signing her at age 16 to his production company, and calling Myrrh Records executive Stan Moser, to advise he was making an album with Grant as part of a long-term production agreement Christian had signed with Myrrh Records. Christian produced her first album and acted as executive producer for her second, handing over production duties to his college friend Brown Bannister. He owned her songs until 1997 when they were sold to Gaylord Entertainment.

He has produced the Pointer Sisters, Patti Austin, Al Jarreau, Natalie Cole, Amy Grant, Dallas Cowboys, B J Thomas, Dan Peek, B W Stevenson, Debby Boone, Steve Archer, Bill Gaither, Marilyn McCoo, Eric Champion, Ali Lohan, Pat Boone, and over 100 other albums.

As the first artist signed to Boardwalk Records owned by Neil Bogart, with Bob Gaudio (Four Seasons) producing, he recorded "I Want You, I Need You," which peaked at No. 37 on the Billboard Hot 100 in November 1981 and reached the No. 8 on Billboard Adult Contemporary Chart. "I Want You, I Need You" was a number one song in some countries outside the US. Cheryl Ladd sings back-up on the song along with many other artists on the album including Christopher Cross, Nigel Olsson, Frankie Valli, Dann Huff, Tommy Funderburk, Bill Champlin, Paul Jackson, Amy Holland, and Robbie Patton. Other artists on Boardwalk were Ringo Starr, Joan Jett, Mike Love (Beach Boys), and Night Ranger. Robert Kardashian (the Kardashians' father) was his best friend, manager and was responsible for Chris signing with Boardwalk Records. A second hit, a medley of the 1968 Marvin Gaye and Tammi Terrell Motown songs "Ain't Nothing Like the Real Thing" and "You're All I Need to Get By" sung with Amy Holland, hit No. 21 on the Adult Contemporary chart and No. 88 on the Hot 100 in 1982.

In 1981, Christian launched his own label Home Sweet Home Records. On that label he signed and produced albums for White Heart, Steve Archer, Mark Heard, Dan Peek, B.J. Thomas, Eric Champion, Rick Riso, Luke Garrett, Marilyn McCoo and others.

In 1992, he founded HSH Educational Media with his brother Brad. He executive produced and wrote the music for the children's series Gerbert, which aired on PBS and what is now ABC Family for over 10 years. His company continues to own and license the Gerbert shows and music. The Gerbert TV series won an ACE award for best Pre-School Show.

Christian purchased The Studios at Las Colinas in 1992 with partner Steve Jarchow. Ross Perot Jr. bought Jarchow's interest in 1993. Christian and Perot purchased the acreage around the Studios Complex selling their interest in the studio and the remaining land to Fox Sports Southwest in 2003.

Christian was CEO of World Digital Media Group and YMC Records, a joint venture by Radio Shack, Dish Network, and Sirius Radio, until May 2007.

In 2015, he became the vice-chairman and managing partner for the WNBA's Dallas Wings.

He was inducted into the West Texas Music Hall of Fame, as well as the Christian Music Hall of Fame in 2007. He is listed among the Distinguished Alumni of Abilene Christian University (class of 1973). His family was a founding family of The Covenant School in Dallas.

== Discography ==
=== Studio albums ===
- 1976: Chris Christian
- 1977: Chance
- 1979: With Your Love
- 1981: Just Sit Back
- 1981: Chris Christian (Boardwalk Co.)
- 1983: Love Them While We Can
- 1984: Let the Music Start
- 1987: Higher Ways
- 1988: Thinking of You This Christmas
- 1989: Focus
- 2000: Harbour

=== Instrumental albums ===
- 1988: No Lyrics
- 1990: Sketches

=== Live albums ===
- 1986: Live at Six Flags (with White Heart)

=== Compilation albums ===
- 1980: The Best of Chris Christian
- 1985: Mirror of Your Heart
- 1991: 15 Best of 15 Years
- 1999: The Collection Vol. 1 1976-1981
- 1999: The Collection Vol. 2 1981-1991

=== Other albums ===
- 1995: The Producer (compilation of other artists)
