= Chuck Wagon & the Wheels =

US musical group

Chuck Wagon and the Wheels
- Genres: Country rock
- Years active: 2000
- Label: Lyric Street
- Past members: Chuck Wagon; Carl "Cal" Pyle; Sid Sequin

Chuck Wagon and the Wheels was an American country music group with a professional wrestling theme. It was composed of vocalists Chuck Wagon, Carl "Cal" Pyle, and Sid Sequin. Respectively, they were pseudonyms of brothers Gordon, Bryan, and Shelby Kennedy. The group signed to Lyric Street Records in 2000, releasing their album Off the Top Rope that year. It included the single "Beauty's in the Eye of the Beerholder," which peaked at 75 on the Billboard country singles charts. Bryan Kennedy purchased the rights to the name Chuck Wagon and the Wheels from the founding member of the original group, Chuck W. Maultsby, in 1998.

== Discography ==
=== Studio albums ===
Title	Album details
Off the Top Rope	Release date: June 13, 2000; Label: Lyric Street Records; Formats: CD, cassette

=== Singles ===
Year	Single	Peak positions	Album
Year	Single	US Country	Album
2000	"Beauty's in the Eye of the Beerholder"	75	Off the Top Rope

=== Music videos ===
Year	Video	Director
2000	"Beauty's in the Eye of the Beerholder"	Trey Fanjoy
