= Military Material Identification Division =

Military Material Identification Division (a.k.a. Chuckwagon) is a division of the United States Department of Defense tasked with identifying and tracking the materials of war used in combat. Reports by Chuckwagon are generally classified.

== See also ==
- Air Force Materiel Command
