= Jennifer York =

American journalist (born 1962)

Jennifer Jean York (born August 30, 1962) is an American journalist and bassist. An award-winning studio and helicopter traffic reporter in Los Angeles, she has received acclaim for her coverage of the Laguna Fire and the Northridge earthquake.

== Early life ==
Jennifer York was born in Covina, California and raised in nearby Hemet. She started playing the piano at the age of five, but switched to playing bass guitar in seventh grade because the instrument reminded her of one that she had seen Paul McCartney play. York graduated from University of California, Los Angeles (UCLA) with a bachelor's degree in Political Science and Communications.

== Career ==
=== Journalism ===
York worked as a talent coordinator for Pierre Cossette Productions, contributing to events such as the Grammy Awards and the American Music Awards. After graduating from UCLA in 1984, York went to New York City to work as an assistant producer for Joel Siegel at Good Morning America. She was eventually promoted to the Field and Series unit. Three years later, she took a job as the promotions director of WWDJ, a Christian radio station in Hackensack, New Jersey. The music playing there inspired her to begin looking at bass-playing as a viable career.

In 1987, after returning to Los Angeles and enrolling in the Musicians Institute, York took a job playing bass guitar with an all-female band at Disneyland, while simultaneously working as a waitress at Jerry's Famous Deli. When the Disneyland job ended two years later, she became a Metro Traffic and aerial reporter for KFWB radio, becoming the second-ever female traffic reporter to fly in a helicopter (the first being Kelly Lange, who flew for KABC). In 1992, she joined KTLA Morning News and Shadow Traffic as their aerial traffic reporter. York won numerous awards for her reporting at the station, earning an Emmy Award in 1993 for her coverage of the Laguna and Malibu fires as well as two more the next year for the Northridge earthquake and her morning news reports. She also received three Golden Mike Awards in 1998, 1999, and 2003 and another Emmy in 2003, and left the station in 2004. She joined the morning show of KFSH-FM a year later alongside Billy Burke, presenting there for two years before leaving the station in 2007. York returned to traffic reporting in 2012, with her familiar voice being heard on the air again, this time reporting from the studios of KNX news radio and working for Total Traffic Network. Over the years, York's visibility throughout Southern California led to her being featured as grand marshal at parades and emceeing at trade, car, and helicopter shows. She retired from KNX On May 10, 2024.

=== Music ===
York is an accomplished bassist. She first played electric bass with the Smart Cookies band, and later with the Christian rock group Rachel Rachel, of which she was the founder. The group, now defunct, recorded two albums on the Word Records label and performed at several events such as the Long Beach Jazz Festival, the Pasadena Playboy Jazz Festival, and the Montreal Drum Festival. In 1992, she began to take up the double bass, being mentored on this instrument by John Clayton, and Christopher Hanulik, principal bassist of the Los Angeles Philharmonic. Three years later, she formed an all-female jazz instrumental group called the Jennifer York Quartet, which performed at various clubs and venues such as the Grape Harvest Festival in Ontario, California and the Southern California Jazz Festival at the Koll Center in Irvine. The band embraces many musical styles including Latin, funk, and swing, along with mainstream jazz. In 1999, the band released a four-song compact disc.

York has been featured on shows such as Larry King Live, Entertainment Tonight, and Leeza, and appeared in films such as Bandits and Hollywood Homicide. During the Mercyhurst College Talent Show scene of Tom Hanks' 1996 movie That Thing You Do!, York can be seen as the acoustic bass player for the girl group that is performing in the contest.

== Personal life ==
York married Nils Johnson—a bassist who played with Ray Charles—in 1993. They lived in Studio City.
