= Rachel Rachel (band) =

American contemporary Christian rock band

- Origin: California, U.S.
- Genres: CCM, Christian rock, pop rock
- Years active: 1990–1994
- Labels: Word, DaySpring
- Past members: Jennifer York; Cheryl Jewell; Heli Sterner; Brynn Beltran; Jennifer Sparks; Robin Spurs

Rachel Rachel was a contemporary Christian rock musical group that was active in the early 1990s. The group is best known as the first American female Christian rock group in CCM performed in an album-oriented rock style. Members included Cheryl Jewell (lead singer), Heli Sterner (lead and rhythm guitars), Brynn Beltran (keyboards), Jennifer York (bass), and Jennifer "Sparky" Sparks (drums). Robin Spurs replaced Jennifer York on bass when York left the group after their first album, but Spurs never recorded for the band.

== Early history ==
Rachel Rachel was first envisioned by bass player Jennifer York while working for a radio station in New York City. She felt that the Lord told her to go to California to play bass, and to start an all-girl rock band. York knew that finding female rock musicians was not going to be an easy task, but talented musicians found their way into each of the needed roles. Lead singer Cheryl Jewell was discovered as the secretary of York's manager, Bob Angelotti. A recent convert to Christianity, Jewell gave up several secular opportunities to join Rachel Rachel. Heli Sterner, a talented guitarist and strong vocalist, and Brynn Beltran, also a strong vocalist and keyboard player, soon also joined the band, and the group began to produce demos. White Heart producer and guitarist Billy Smiley heard one of these demos and began to help the group to prepare material for their first album. The last member of the original band to be recruited was Jennifer "Sparky" Sparks, who would play drums for the band until they disbanded in 1994.

== Career years ==
Rachel Rachel signed on with Word Records in 1990, and began working on their first album. Released in 1991, Way to My Heart featured the members of Rachel Rachel, as well as studio musicians including Carl Marsh, Dann Huff, and several members of White Heart. The album contained a number of songs written by band members, as well as covers such as the Kansas classic, "Carry On Wayward Son". The eighth track from this album, "I Will Stand by You", written by lead singer Cheryl Jewell, Sue Sheridan, and Matthew Christianson, became a No. 4 radio hit. The album itself hit the No. 25 mark on the Billboard Contemporary Christian Music chart in June 1991.

With the success of Rachel Rachel's first album, founder Jennifer York decided that she could quit the band. The remaining members could see only one possible replacement for a female bass player: Robin Spurs, who had recently left The Choir. However, initially Spurs declined the group's offer, feeling that she was not ready to go back into music so quickly. Later, she accepted the position, saying that God had told her to get back into music with Rachel Rachel.

With a new band member ready to roll, the group released a second album, You Oughta Know by Now, in 1993. Again, this album was produced by Billy Smiley, and featured guest artists such as Mark Matheson, Blair Masters, Smiley, and Dann Huff. Before recording, Spurs left the band so York returned to add electric bass to the album. "Only Heaven Knows" (written by Smiley, Beltran, and Sterner) and "You'll Never Know" (written by Beltran) both became No. 1 songs, and greatly increased Rachel Rachel's popularity.

After releasing this album, Rachel Rachel spent seven months touring with WhiteHeart. However, apparently at the top of their career, Rachel Rachel disbanded. Brynn Beltran, keyboard player for the group, cited "creative differences" as part of the reasons for disbanding, explaining that because the group was based in California they were too far from the music scene in Nashville.

== Awards ==
Dove Award (Nomination) Best New Artist

== Discography ==
- Way to My Heart (1991)
- You Oughta Know by Now (1993)

=== Compilations ===
The Radio Collection 5 (1991)

- "Carry On Wayward Son"
