= Eric Champion =

American singer-songwriter

- Born: May 12, 1970 (age 56); Valdosta, Georgia
- Genres: Contemporary Christian music
- Occupations: Singer; songwriter; record producer
- Instruments: Keyboard, drums

Eric Champion (born May 12, 1970) is an American Christian pop and rock musician. Although his first album was released when he was only 18 years old, one of Champions's biggest albums during his pop phase was Vertical Reality, which went on to sell nearly 100,000 units.

Champion also is noted for songwriting with various artists including Rebecca St. James and Plumb.

== Discography ==
- Win, 1988
- Eric Champion, 1990
- Revolution Time, 1991
- Hot Christmas, 1992
- Save The World, 1992
- The B/W Project, 1993 (Along with Rodney "T" Thomas) Released through Warner Alliance.
- Vertical Reality, 1994
- Lover's Heart (Soft Hits), 1995
- Transformation, 1996
- Natural, 1998
- The Greatest Hits of Eric Champion, 2000
- Unexpected EP, 2005
- Rook -Bad Memory EP, 2005
