= Home Sweet Home Records =

- Founded: 1981
- Founder: Chris Christian
- Distributor(s): Benson Records, Word Records, Diadem Records
- Genre: Contemporary Christian music, Gospel music
- Country of origin: United States
- Location: Dallas, Texas
- Official website: www.homesweethomerecords.com

Home Sweet Home Records (also known as CC Entertainment) is a record label, based in Dallas, Texas.

== History ==
Home Sweet Home began in 1981, in Nashville, Tennessee. It was founded by singer, songwriter and producer Chris Christian. Since its introduction into the music industry, the label has released over one hundred projects, including many that charted on the Christian charts.

In the 1980s, Home Sweet Home held a prominent position in the contemporary Christian music market. Albums were released by artists such as Steve Archer, Dan Peek, Chris Christian, White Heart and others. In 1983, Home Sweet Home released what is believed to be the first ever contemporary Christian music video with Archer's Through His Eyes of Love.

Perhaps its most well-known artist would turn out to be Mark Heard, who released five albums with the label in the early 1980s. Christian decided to sign Heard, because of his deep lyrics and no other Christian label would sign or release edgy music at the time. After Heard's death in 1992, the label re-issued edited versions of his albums, and some unreleased material in the late 90s in the CD format.

Since 2005, Home Sweet Home has been known as CC Entertainment and YMC Records. The label also began reissuing the catalog in CDs. Its parent company, YMC Productions, is owned by Chris Smith, Savannah Smith, Casey Smith, Courtney Smith and Preston Smith.

== Artists ==
Below are a few of the artists that have recorded on Home Sweet Home Records:

- Steve Archer
- The Boone Sisters
- Eric Champion
- Steve Chapman
- Chris Christian
- Jeremy Dalton
- Mike Eldred
- Tennessee Ernie Ford
- Luke Garrett
- Glen Allen Green
- Tami Gunden
- Mark Heard
- David Martin
- Marilyn McCoo
- Dan Peek
- Reba Rambo
- B W Stevenson
- White Heart

== See also ==
- List of record labels
