= Gordon Kennedy (musician) =

American musician

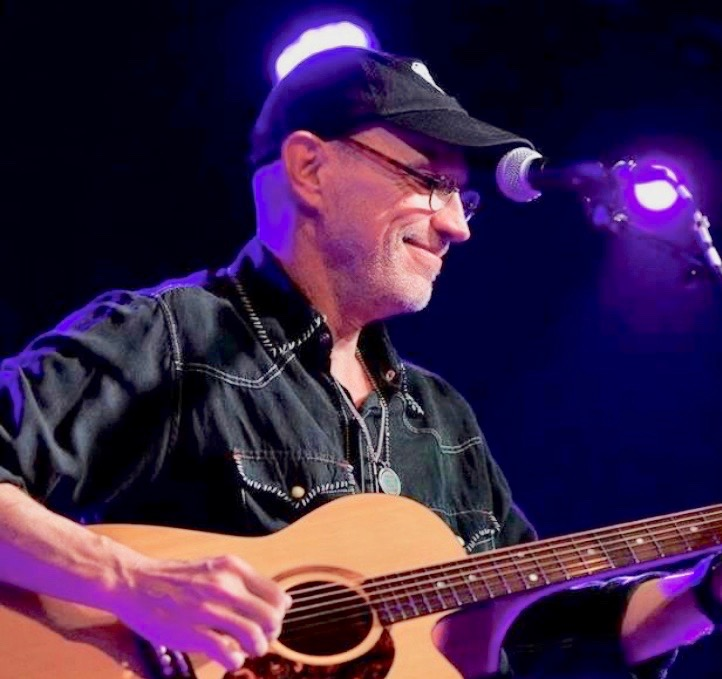
- Kennedy performing in 2018, photo by Andrew Orth

Background information
- Also known as: Chuck Wagon
- Born: Gordon Scott Kennedy; November 1959 (age 66–67); Shreveport, Louisiana, U.S.
- Origin: Nashville
- Genres: Christian rock; pop; country; bluegrass
- Occupations: Songwriter, musician, producer
- Instruments: Guitar, vocals
- Years active: 1984–present
- Formerly of: White Heart, Chuck Wagon & the Wheels

Gordon Scott Kennedy is an American songwriter, musician, and record producer based in Nashville, Tennessee whose most successful composition is the international hit song "Change the World", recorded by Eric Clapton, for which Kennedy and his co-writers received a Grammy Award for Song of the Year (1996). Kennedy also received a Grammy for Best Pop Instrumental Album (2007), co-producing, composing, and performing on Peter Frampton's Fingerprints album. He was a member of the Christian rock band White Heart for six years in the 1980s. Kennedy has written 15 songs recorded by Garth Brooks, and has done projects with Frampton and Ricky Skaggs. Kennedy's songs have been recorded by artists including Bonnie Raitt, Alison Krauss, Stevie Nicks, Faith Hill, and Carrie Underwood. His compositions have been heard in the film soundtracks of Tin Cup, For Love of the Game, Where the Heart Is, Almost Famous, Summer Catch, Someone Like You, The Banger Sisters, Phenomenon and Disney's The Fox and the Hound 2.

== Early life ==
Kennedy was born in Shreveport, Louisiana, but his family moved to Nashville in March 1961 when he was just over one year old. Both his parents were professional musicians who came to Nashville hoping to advance their careers. His father, Jerry Kennedy, was a guitar player in the house band of "Louisiana Hayride" and married Linda Brannon, Gordon's mother, who was a singer on the show with her own recording career. After moving to Nashville, his father became successful as a session musician (member of the Musicians Hall of Fame/A-team) and eventually his business acumen propelled his rise to CEO of Mercury Records (Nashville division), a job he held for 20 years.

Kennedy is the oldest of three brothers— the next is Bryan and the youngest is Shelby. Both Kennedy's brothers are successful in music. Bryan wrote the Garth Brooks hit, American Honky-Tonk Bar Association and Shelby is a music executive who has composed songs recorded by Reba McEntire and Ray Charles. Of the brothers, Gordon took music most seriously. Kennedy recalls having a jukebox in their home stocked with 45 rpm records his father had played on or produced. The first non-country album Kennedy owned was Meet the Beatles! which he said "kind of lit a fire under me in the second grade". Attending recording sessions with his father was a common occurrence for him as a youth. He said the country music his father was producing; i.e., Roger Miller, Johnny Rodriguez, and the Statler Brothers, was a major influence on him. At age 15, he received a Fender Telecaster for Christmas and two months later he played his first gig in a talent show with Jerry Reed's daughter, his classmate.

Kennedy attended high school at Nashville's Brentwood Academy where he excelled in sports. He played football, basketball and ran track; he won the regional high-jump championship in 1978. He was designated as the "most athletic student" his final year. He performed on his first recording session while still a high school student— a solo on Johnny Rodriguez' song "Run Like a Thief" and he performed a guitar duet with his father on "Remember Me". Kennedy wrote his first song in the high school auditorium during his graduating year. Another of Kennedy's Brentwood Academy classmates was guitarist and bandmate Dann Huff who was, at that time, in the early days of forging his own path to becoming a first-call session guitarist in Nashville and Los Angeles, later recording with Madonna, Whitney Houston, Michael Jackson and Barbra Streisand. Kennedy said, "I was watching [Huff] become 'that guy' and he drove me to play better". Kennedy later attended Belmont University in Nashville and during that time worked playing guitar in studios on music row. The increasing demands of recording sessions conflicted with school to the extent that he decided to drop out of Belmont his final year before receiving his degree.

== Career ==
=== White Heart ===
In 1984 Kennedy joined the Christian rock band White Heart. The six-member group was formed two years earlier by Billy Smiley and Mark Gersmehl who were members of Bill Gaither and the New Gaither Vocal Band. Other original members included Kennedy's high school friend, Dann Huff and Dann's brother, drummer David Huff. Dann Huff left the group in 1984 and recommended that Kennedy should be his replacement. Kennedy was in the band for six years. White Heart remained in existence for a total of 17 years and released 13 studio albums with many personnel changes over that time. Music historian Don Cusic said, "The group had great musicians; many of them played studio sessions in Nashville, and the talent of the individual members is evident from their post-White Heart success". Dann Huff became an award-winning guitarist and producer; Tommy Sims joined Bruce Springsteen's touring band; Kennedy founded the group Dogs of Peace In 2010, White Heart was inducted into the Christian Music Hall of Fame.

=== Dogs of Peace ===
Kennedy recalled that songwriting began to click for him about 1991 when he began co-writing with his friend, Wayne Kirkpatrick. Dogs of Peace formed in 1995, consisting of Kennedy, Jimmie Sloas, Blair Masters, and John Hammond, with Jeff Balding as engineer. Reviewer Chris Smith described their music as "90s alt/rock feel with some classic rock elements with many comparisons to Pink Floyd". Their first album, Speak, was released in 1996. Twenty years later, in 2016, Kennedy, Sloas, Masters, Hammond and Balding reunited for a second album called Heel.

=== Garth Brooks, Ricky Skaggs, Peter Frampton ===
Kennedy spent the mid-1990s composing songs and honing his skills as a session guitarist, primarily for contemporary Christian artists like Amy Grant, Twila Paris, Susan Ashton, Steven Curtis Chapman and PFR (aka Pray for Rain). (Note: PFR abandoned the name "Pray for Rain" and changed it to "PFR" because of a conflict with a California sound track group band called "Pray for Rain".) Kennedy co-wrote "You Move Me" recorded by Garth Brooks which reached No. 3 on the Billboard Country Airplay Chart in 1998. Brooks subsequently recorded ten more of Kennedy's songs on his alter-ego album, The Life of Chris Gaines which reached No. 2 on the Billboard 200 chart. As of 2018, Kennedy has written or co-written 15 songs recorded by Brooks.

In 2010, Ricky Skaggs, trying a new sound and a new source of material, recorded Mosaic, an album with all 13 songs written or co-written by Kennedy. NPR reviewer Ken Tucker stated, "Something in the chemistry that occurs in mixing Gordon Kennedy's melodies, the Christian imagery of the lyrics and the surging vocals results in music that is both vivid and thoughtful." It was a break from the past for Skaggs who has said that he felt something of the Beatles influence in Kennedy's music. The album received two Grammy nominations. Peter Frampton made a guest appearance on the album with the song, "My Cup Runneth Over".

In 1999, at a meeting suggested by mutual friends, Kennedy was invited to Peter Frampton's home which was convenient since they both lived in the Nashville suburb of Brentwood. They developed a friendship and decided to write together eventually leading to Frampton's album Now for which Kennedy co-wrote eight songs. Their collaboration continued, leading to Kennedy's co-producing, composing, and performing on Frampton's album, Fingerprints which won a Grammy for Best Pop Instrumental Album. (Note: The award, "Best Pop Instrumental Album", was renamed by The Recording Academy in 2014 to be called "Best Contemporary Instrumental Album".) (Kennedy's Grammy was for co-producing.) The album featured guest artists including members of the Rolling Stones, Pearl Jam, and the Allman Brothers. On the album, Kennedy was featured on the song "Float". In nearly 20 years of friendship, Kennedy remains Frampton's collaborator and performs with him often on tour. As of 2017, Kennedy has composed for or recorded with Bonnie Raitt (five songs, including "Gypsy in Me"), Reba McEntire, Tim McGraw, Wynonna, Charlie Daniels, Trisha Yearwood, George Strait, Faith Hill ("It Will Be Me"), Carrie Underwood ("The More Boys I Meet"), and others.

=== "Change the World" ===
The enduring worldwide hit song, "Change the World", earned Kennedy a Grammy for "Song of the Year" in 1996. The song was first recorded in 1995 by Wynonna Judd and later Eric Clapton through the release of the John Travolta film, Phenomenon, in mid-1996. Clapton's version, produced by Kenneth "Babyface" Edmonds, spent 81 weeks on Billboard's adult contemporary chart, with 13 weeks at No.1. Clapton and Edmonds performed the song at the 39th Annual Grammy Awards Show in 1996, where the song won "Record of the Year", "Song of the Year", and "Best Male Pop Vocal Performance".

Kennedy wrote the song with two collaborators: the first was Tommy Sims, bassist, songwriter, producer and former White Heart bandmate who later recorded and sang with Bruce Springsteen on "Streets of Philadelphia" which won an Academy Award for "Best Song"; the second was Wayne Kirkpatrick, a prolific Nashville songwriter who was nominated for a Tony Award for Best Original Score for the Broadway musical Something Rotten!

In a recorded interview with Songcraft, Kennedy gave his recollection of how the three men worked together to create the song: in 1991, during some downtime at a recording session, Tommy Sims gave a title and played a riff for Kennedy and Wayne Kirkpatrick and asked if they thought it was something their group could use for a pending record contract. About a month later, Kirkpatrick asked Sims to restate that idea on tape; Kirkpatrick then created the lyric for the chorus and all but one line of the second verse. The song lay dormant for several months, until Kennedy asked for a tape of the song's current state, then finished the tune to the extent he thought was enough to make a demo. Kennedy then drove from Nashville to Columbus, Ohio, to see Sims, who was recording there. They made a tape on a Shure 57 microphone, creating drum sounds by using mouth and breath noises. On Kennedy's drive back to Nashville he listened to it and finished the first verse and Kirkpatrick's missing line of the second verse, dictating into a hand-held recorder. Once home, he remade the demo singing all the vocals over an acoustic guitar part — this about one year after the original riff, and that was the demo that Clapton heard. Clapton told Mojo Magazine in May 2003, "When I heard Tommy Sims' demo, I could hear McCartney doing that [song]..." Clapton later learned that it was Kennedy who sang the demo.

== Chuck Wagon & the Wheels ==
In 2000, Kennedy founded a professional wrestling-themed country group called Chuck Wagon & the Wheels with his brothers Bryan and Shelby. Respectively, they credited themselves under the names Chuck Wagon, Carl Pyle, and Sid Sequin. This group recorded one album for Lyric Street Records that year, which included the single "Beauty's in the Eye of the Beerholder".

== Personal life ==
Kennedy enjoys performing in a Beatles tribute band called Mystery Trip, which includes veteran professionals such Frampton's keyboardist Rob Arthur; Crash Test Dummies tour player Saul Zonana; and Steve Allen of 20/20. He participates in songwriter workshops and gives master classes on songwriting including college campuses. Kennedy served on the Board of Governors of the National Academy of Recording Arts and Sciences (Nashville Chapter) and on Belmont University's advisory board. He also was a member of the Brentwood Academy Board of Trustees from 2006 until 2010. In 1997 Kennedy was inducted into the Southern Songwriters Guild Hall of Fame.
