= White Heart =

American contemporary Christian/pop-rock band (1982–1997)

- Origin: United States
- Genres: Contemporary Christian music; Christian rock
- Years active: 1982–1997, 2006, 2013–2015, 2019
- Labels: Home Sweet Home; Sparrow; Star Song; Curb
- Past members: Mark Gersmehl; Billy Smiley; Rick Florian; Anthony Sallee; Brian Wooten; Chris McHugh; Gordon Kennedy; Dann Huff; David Huff; Gary Lunn; Tommy Sims; Mark Nemer; Jon Knox; Mark Hill; John Thorn; Steve Green; Scott Douglas; Kevin Mills; Scott Bernard

White Heart, also listed as Whiteheart, was an American contemporary Christian music and pop-rock band which formed in 1982. White Heart's discography includes thirteen albums, the most recent of which was released in 1997. Original members Billy Smiley and Mark Gersmehl worked with a continually changing cast of bandmates. In 1986, former roadie Rick Florian became the lead singer.

Smiley started his own label, Cul-de-Sac Records. Gersmehl continues to write music and has released solo efforts. Florian is a real estate agent in the Franklin, Tennessee, area and also continues to sing for various recording projects.

== History ==
=== Formation ===
White Heart formed in 1982, and the first two albums were produced by Bill Smiley and Dann Huff. These two friends were listening to groups like Toto, Boz Scaggs, Journey, and Steely Dan at the time they formed White Heart. The original lineup consisted of Billy Smiley (guitar, keyboards, and occasional lead vocals), Mark Gersmehl (keyboards and occasional lead vocals), Steve Green (lead vocals), Gary Lunn (bass), and brothers Dann (guitars/backing voc.) and David Huff (drums).

Whiteheart was pursued by every major Christian label until Chris Christian heard their demo and signed them to Home Sweet Home Records and gave them their first record deal. By the time they released their third album, they were selling in excess of 250,000 albums. After their self-titled debut album was released in 1982, the band went through its first lineup change: Green left the band, saying that rock was not his style. They went on to tour with David Meece and Farrell and Farrell for the next two years, building their fan base, with Scott Douglas as Green's replacement as lead vocalist. Green continued to sing background vocals on Vital Signs, and they had their first No. 1 single, We Are His Hands, with Douglas singing the lead, and Smiley and Green singing the harmonies.

The band released its second album, Vital Signs, in 1984. Douglas was with the band for two years before being charged with aggravated sexual battery on June 30, 1985. He was sentenced to prison in March 1986.

Dann Huff left the band shortly after to pursue his dream of being a studio musician, and recommended his high school friend, Gordon Kennedy as his replacement for the WhiteHeart album, Hotline. Later, in 1985, David Huff left the band to pursue other interests as well, including touring with Michael W. Smith. Eventually, he would join his brother Dann to form the hard rock band Giant.

=== The Sparrow years ===
With Douglas gone, the remaining band members began to audition singers. In 1985, they were surprised when they saw and heard their stage manager and roadie, Rick Florian, dancing around on the stage and "karaoke" singing along to the song "Every Time You Go Away", which the sound company used to sonically tune the room each night during soundcheck. A few weeks later, Florian came up to Smiley and asked if he could audition for the lead vocalist position, and he was later chosen as Douglas' replacement. He became a core member of the band and continued through the rest of White Heart's discography. Chris McHugh was also picked up to fill the drummer seat.

White Heart's 1986 release, Don't Wait for the Movie, was released with their first major headlining tour and had major support from Sparrow Records and Billy Ray Hearn, who had personally come out to meet and hopefully sign the band. He hired Smiley as the producer for the record. It continues to be one of the band's most successful selling albums with three No. 1 songs, and breaking all previous album sales. The album was ranked at number 74 from CCM Magazine from their 2001 book CCM Presents: The 100 Greatest Albums in Christian Music. The band kept on touring and recording. Gary Lunn left the band to become a studio musician and was replaced with Tommy Sims.

After Emergency Broadcast was released in 1987, White Heart made an important change with Brown Bannister coming on as producer for their next album. Bannister was known for working with Amy Grant, recording out at the Bennett House in Franklin, TN. Because of the fractured approach to having each member producing songs for Emergency Broadcast, Smiley suggested getting an outside presence that every member would respect and respond to.

The band's album, 1989's Freedom, featured a more original approach, with the band going to a rehearsal hall and working out all the material for three weeks before even going into the studio, and having Bannister help find the best songs, and pull the most out of each member both musically and vocally. "Freedom" has been hailed as one of White Heart's best ever. Songs like "The River Will Flow", "Let The Kingdom Come", "Over Me", "Bye Bye Babylon", and "Sing Your Freedom" would become live fan favorites for years to come. But stability remained elusive. The band reached the end of its contract with Sparrow Records and Brown Bannister. Also, Chris McHugh, Gordon Kennedy, and Tommy Sims left the band to become studio musicians.

=== The Star Song era ===
White Heart signed on with Star Song Records, and hired Brian Wooten (guitars), Anthony Sallee (bass), and Mark Nemer (drums) to fill the spots. With these pieces in place, the band released one of its best-known albums, Powerhouse, in 1990. "Desert Rose", "Independence Day", and "Powerhouse" were No. 1 songs, and "Desert Rose" became one of their biggest anthems and career songs to date. Nemer left soon after and the band brought back former drummer Chris McHugh to do the drumming for Tales of Wonder, with the exception of one song on which they used Jon Knox.

The band released Tales of Wonder in 1992 produced by Smiley and Gersmehl. They also brought back Brown Bannister as a production adviser for the project and announced Jon Knox as their new drummer.

White Heart followed this success with Highlands in 1993, which also received critical and commercial praise. Touring non-stop from the Freedom through the Highlands release, this period was the most rewarding and captivating time of their touring career. Anthony Sallee left the band and John Thorn was hired to replace him for the Highlands Tour.

In 1994, the band released two compilation albums: Nothing But the Best: Rock Classics and Nothing But the Best: Radio Classics, which included two new songs each and marked the end of the band's contract with Star Song.

=== The Curb years ===
White Heart signed with a mainstream label, Curb Records, as the label's first foray into the Christian Music contemporary rock market. The band released Inside in 1995 and stylized their name as "Whiteheart". The album had mixed reviews from the Christian market, but was quite successful on the Christian radio charts and yielded several No. 1 singles in the Christian Radio Market: "Inside" and "Even the Hardest Heart" were both No. 1 songs. This album was notably produced and mixed by the legendary Ken Scott, whose production and engineering credits include The Beatles, David Bowie and Supertramp.This record marked an edgier sound and was also the band's launch through the newly created and now-defunct Warner Christian Distribution. The band's lineup continued to be a revolving door. Brian Wooten, John Thorn and Jon Knox all left to pursue other projects.

The remaining core members (Smiley, Gersmehl, Florian) regrouped to consider the band's future. They released their final Curb album, Redemption, in 1997 using studio musician friends. It received critical praise for its depth and musical maturity. After its release, Smiley, Gersmehl and Florian entered what they called "a dormant or eternal sabbatical stage". They have not officially broken Whiteheart up, but each of them is working on separate personal projects as well as Smiley producing full-time. Florian issued a statement in 1999 regarding the future of the band.

On August 25, 2006, White Heart received a Soul2Soul Honor award in New Albany, Indiana. Billy Smiley, Rick Florian, Mark Gersmehl, Tommy Sims, Jon Knox and Gordon Kennedy reunited to perform "Over Me" and "Sing Your Freedom". According to Florian, it was the first time in 17 years that particular combination of musicians had performed together, although Knox had never actually been in the band at the same time as Sims or Kennedy.

In July 2013 the band announced their first full concert since 1998 would be at Easterfest in Toowoomba, Australia on April 19, 2014. A limited reunion US tour was announced for late 2014. The tour was postponed to early 2015. Several venues were selected and tickets were sold, however, on January 13, 2015, the band announced the tour would have to be canceled due to circumstances beyond their control, and all tickets were refunded.

Florian, Gershmehl, Kennedy, McHugh and Sims performed a benefit concert in celebration of the 30th anniversary of the release of Freedom on June 29, 2019, at the New Hope Community Church in Brentwood, Tennessee. Scott Bernard, who joined White Heart for the Australian Easterfest concert in 2014, handled Smiley's original album guitar parts. The album's producer, Brown Bannister, was also present, and vocalist Bart Millard of MercyMe acted as emcee for the evening.

== Honors ==
Although White Heart is considered one of the premier bands to ever play contemporary Christian music, and despite the many No. 1 hits and albums, they have never won a Grammy or Dove Award. White Heart was inducted into the Christian Music Hall of Fame on November 6, 2010.

== Band members ==
- Billy Smiley – vocal, rhythm and acoustic guitars, keyboards, trumpet (1982–1997)
- Mark Gersmehl – vocal, keyboards, trombone, recorder, percussion (1982–1997)
- Rick Florian – vocal (1986–1997) (the band intentionally misspelled his name differently on each album)
- Steve Green – vocal, triangle (1982–1983)
- Dann Huff – vocal, lead guitar (1982–1984)
- David Huff – drums, percussion, backing vocals (1982–1985)
- Gary Lunn – bass, Linn programming (1982–1986)
- Scott Douglas – vocal (1984–1985)
- Gordon Kennedy – vocal, lead guitars, sitar (1985–1989)
- Chris McHugh – drums, percussion (1986–1989, 1992)
- Tommy Sims – vocal, bass, keyboards, synth-bass (1986–1989)
- Mark Nemer – drums, percussion (1990)
- Anthony Sallee – bass (1990–1993)
- Brian Wooten – lead guitar (1990–1995)
- Jon Knox – drums, percussion (1991–1996)
- Mark Hill – bass (1994, 1996)
- John Thorn – bass, backing vocal (1995)
- Kevin Mills – bass (1995–1996)
- Barry Graul – guitar (1996)
- Mike Mead– drums (1996)
- Scott Bernard - lead guitar (2014)

== Discography ==
- White Heart (1982)
- Vital Signs (1984)
- Hotline (1985)
- Don't Wait for the Movie (1986)
- Emergency Broadcast (1987)
- Freedom (1989)
- Powerhouse (1990)
- Tales of Wonder (1992)
- Highlands (1993)
- Inside (1995)
- Redemption (1997)
