= Bennett House (Franklin, Tennessee) =

Historic residence in Franklin, Tennessee, U.S.

Coordinates: 35.921538°N 86.868097°W

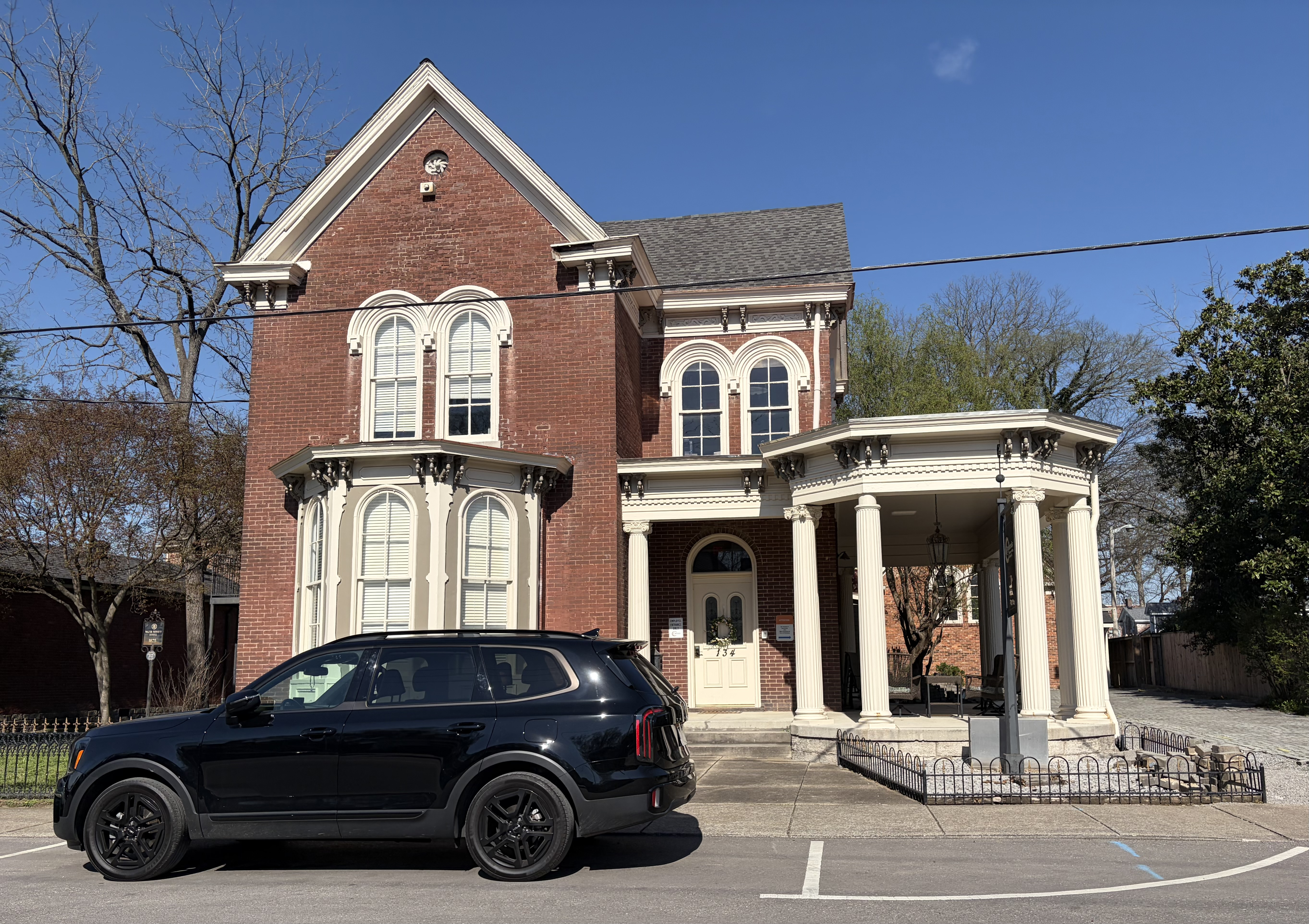
The Bennett House

The Bennett House is a historic residence and former recording studio located on 134 4th Avenue North in Franklin, Tennessee.

== History ==
The house is named after Walter James Bennett, a soldier serving in the Confederate Army during the American Civil War. For a time, Bennett served on the staff of Major General William Whiting until he was captured in Virginia in 1864. Bennett spent the remainder of the Civil War in prison at Fort Donelson, Tennessee until his release in 1865. In 1872, Bennett purchased the lot on Indigo Street, which was later renamed 4th Avenue North. The two-story Bennett House was built on the property in 1875. The home remained in the Bennett family until 1967 when its ownership passed onto someone outside of the family for the first time in ninety-two years. Some believe the stately Victorian mansion to be haunted by the ghosts of Walter James Bennett and his second wife Elizabeth.

=== Recording studio ===
The building would then serve as a residence, a clothing store, and, starting in 1980, a recording studio used by many popular music artists when recording in Tennessee. Artists that have frequently recorded at the studio include 1970's rock and roll producer Norbert Putnam (Kris Kristofferson, Dan Fogelberg, Jimmy Buffett, Dusty Springfield), country music producer Bob Montgomery (Joe Diffie, Waylon Jennings), producer Keith Thomas (Amy Grant, Vanessa Williams, Selena, 98 Degrees). Thomas would even have one of the two studios in the building named after him when "Studio A" became known as "The Thomas Room." Other artists to use the studio include Dan Fogelberg, Phil Keaggy, Randy Stonehill, and Chagall Guevara. In the early 1990s, Montgomery produced acts such as Joe Diffie, Doug Stone, Jo-El Sonnier, George Jones, Tammy Wynette, Willie Nelson, Vince Gill and many, many others.

Gene Eichelberger, Audio Engineer probably most known for recording Dobie Gray's "Drift Away", engineered many of these sessions on a Studer A800 24 track analog machine with Bob Montgomery.

While serving as a music venue, the historic home was twice home to "Porch Jam", a summer music festival for musicians of varying genre who came from throughout the country to participate. This festival was presented by Signpost Records (Randall G. Hayward & Cory Hayward) and sponsored primarily by Our House Crafts (Lisa Hayward, Glass Painter).

The Bennett House Recording Studios ceased all tracking and mixing operations on July 1, 2008, and has housed a variety of small businesses since that time.
