= Rick Florian =

- Born: April 10, 1962 (age 63)
- Origin: South Bend, Indiana, U.S.
- Genres: CCM, rock
- Occupation(s): Singer, songwriter, producer
- Instrument: Vocals
- Years active: 1986–present

Rick Florian (born April 10, 1962) is a musician, songwriter and producer, most known for being the lead singer of contemporary Christian music rock band White Heart from 1986 through to their disbandment in 1998. He lives in Franklin, Tennessee with his wife, Lisa, and two of their five children. Florian works as a real estate agent, though he has sung on several music projects over the years.

== Early life ==
Florian was born in South Bend, Indiana, in 1962. He graduated from Taylor University in 1984, where he studied biology.

== Whiteheart ==
Florian was a lighting tech/roadie for the band back in the 80s. When Florian was caught off guard singing and dancing to White Heart's songs, he was asked to audition for the open position as the band's vocalist. He got the job and recorded eight studio albums with them.

Throughout his tenure with the band, he was praised on several occasions for his clean voice and excellent performing abilities. He could always find a clever spot to show off his back handspring in each concert. Despite not being a founding member, he became the core of White Heart along with Billy Smiley and Mark Gersmehl (who's also an Indiana native, like Florian himself). Florian issued a statement several years ago that the band was only at "a dormant stage".

When Florian released his first album with White Heart, a tradition of using unique spelling variations of his name for each album began. There is no precise account as to who started it, but it remained up until the last albums of the band. The various spellings used have been: Ric, Rikk, Riq, Ricke, Rhic, Rikcq, Ricque. Florian has also been known to go by the nickname, "Tubes".
