= Mark Gersmehl =

- Birth name: Mark Gersmehl
- Born: July 29, 1954 (age 70)
- Origin: Fort Wayne, Indiana, U.S.
- Genres: CCM, rock
- Occupation(s): keyboardist, songwriter, author
- Instrument(s): Keyboards, trombone, vocals
- Years active: 1982–present
- Labels: Spring Hill Music Group

Mark "Gersh" Gersmehl (born July 29, 1954) is a contemporary Christian musician who is best known as one of the founding members of the Christian rock group White Heart. He and guitarist Billy Smiley were the only two original members of the band to stay with White Heart from its conception in 1982 through its disbandment in 1998. Gersmehl played keyboards in the band, as well as occasionally singing lead vocals. He also contributed his songwriting skills, penning 15 of White Heart's 16 No. 1 hits. When the group disbanded in 1998, he began a solo career, releasing his first solo album in 2002.

== Early life ==
Gersmehl was born in Fort Wayne, Indiana in 1954, and spend his childhood in the area. His first musical memories are classical, at home and at the local Lutheran church. His first instrument was the piano, although he later studied trombone, baritone, flute, and recorder. At the age of 15 he performed his first "professional" gig at a wedding reception with the New World Quintet. Later, he would play trombone with the O'Jays, the legendary Philadelphia Sound group, as well as with several professional orchestras in Indiana.

== Gaither Vocal Band ==
While attending Ball State University, Gersmehl began playing horns at the studios of Bill and Gloria Gaither. Other studio musicians suggested that he go on the road with the Gaither Vocal Band, but at first Gersmehl was hesitant. The third time his studio friends insisted, Gersmehl agreed to go on the road. He would play keyboards and horn on tour with the Gaithers for four years.

== White Heart ==
By 1981, Billy Smiley and Gersmehl, both of whom were playing with the New Gaither Vocal Band at the time, found that they were tired of playing backups for other artists, and felt that they wanted to go out on their own and let the Lord work through them. They decided to start their own contemporary Christian music group singing some of their co-written compositions. Four musicians who were in the Gaither Trio, the Gaither Vocal Band, or both—Dann and David Huff, Steve Green, and Gary Lunn—decided to join the duo in the formation of the band, which was eventually named "White Heart".

Through White Heart's numerous lineup changes, Smiley and Gersmehl, the primary songwriters of the group, stayed on. Gersmehl wrote or co-wrote 15 of the White Heart's 16 No. 1 hits, as well as numerous other Top 10 hits for other artists including Kathy Troccoli, Sandi Patty, and Geoff Moore. The band was nominated for 2 Grammy Awards and 22 Dove Awards; however, they never won either award. In 1998, the group disbanded.

== Solo career ==
While still with White Heart, Gersmehl was encouraged by others in the music industry to consider a solo career. However, he did not begin a solo career immediately after the disbanding of White Heart. By the early 2000s, Gersmehl was ready to roll again, releasing his first solo album, "Awakening", in March 2002. Gersmehl continues to tour both in the US and abroad, as well as teaching and encouraging Christians and other musicians. In 2012 Gersmehl started a duo with his wife, Brynn called soulbreather. They now make alt.rock/folk music with a Christian message and travel to churches around the US playing music and occasionally doing soulbreather worship seminars to help worship teams. In 2016, Gersmehl is writing a book about the Soulbreather which he hopes to release in 2017

== Family life ==
On an eight-month tour in 1993, White Heart's opening act was Rachel Rachel, CCM's first all-girl rock band. Gersmehl and Rachel Rachel's keyboard player, Brynn Beltran, began a relationship that blossomed into the two falling in love. After the tour, Gersmehl showed up on her doorstep, and proposed. The two were married on August 1, 1993. The two currently live in Nashville, Tennessee and have one son.

== Discography ==
=== With White Heart ===
See White Heart discography

=== Solo work ===
Awakening (2002)
