= Billy Smiley =

American musician, songwriter and producer (born 1957)

- Born: October 19, 1957 (age 68); Farmington, Michigan, United States
- Education: Bethel College; Azusa Pacific University
- Genres: Contemporary Christian, Christian rock
- Occupations: Guitarist, songwriter, producer
- Instruments: Guitar, keyboards, vocals
- Years active: 1982–present
- Website: www.billysmiley.com

Billy Smiley (born October 19, 1957, in Farmington, Michigan) is an American music producer, songwriter, and musician. He is best known for being one of the core members of the Christian rock band White Heart. He was the band's guitarist and vocalist and one of the main songwriters from its conception in 1982 through its disbandment in 1998.

After selling more than 2 million albums with White Heart, Smiley turned to music production and artist development. He is credited with producing or developing such Christian acts as Geoff Moore and the Distance, Margaret Becker, Rhonda Gunn, Newsboys, and Bebe & Cece Winans. His most recent, and notable, writing and production accomplishment was earning a platinum certified album for former American Idol finalist Clay Aiken's version of Smiley's song "Merry Christmas with Love". He has teamed with classically trained baritone David Britton on two released albums and one upcoming release. In 2021, Smiley collaborated with Nashville-based soul and acoustic artist, the late Larysa Jaye, producing songs including "Birmingham (Side by Side)" and "No Other Face". "Birmingham (Side by Side)", released through Southern Skye Records, pays homage to the civil rights movement.

Smiley has degrees in music theory and composition from Bethel College (now Bethel University) and Azusa Pacific University.

A solo album by Smiley, New Night (1986), centers on his trumpet playing.
