= Facts of Love (album) =

Studio album by Kim Boyce
- Released: 1992
- Studios: Midtown Tone & Volume, OmniSound Studios, Woodland Studios, Quad Studios, GBT Studio, Allies Studios, Javelina Studios and Sixteenth Avenue Sound (Nashville, Tennessee); Classic Recording and Shakin' Studios (Franklin, Tennessee)
- Genres: CCM, dance pop, adult contemporary
- Length: 41:39
- Label: Warner Alliance
- Producers: Bryan Lenox; Brian Tankersley

Kim Boyce chronology
This I Know (1990)	Facts of Love (1992)	By Faith (1994)

Professional ratings
Review scores
Source	Rating
AllMusic	2/5 stars

Facts of Love is the fifth studio album by American Christian singer-songwriter Kim Boyce, released in 1992. It is Boyce's first album on Warner Music Group's Christian/gospel label Warner Alliance. The album's first single released to both Christian AC and Christian CHR/Pop was "When Love Calls Your Name", which was originally recorded by American actress and singer Cher on her 1991 album Love Hurts. The title song is a cover of the British pop duo Climie Fisher from their 1989 album Coming In for the Kill. Brian Tankersley and musician Bryan Lenox produced five tracks each. The album debuted and peaked at number 16 on the Billboard Top Christian Albums chart.

== Track listing ==
No.	Title	Writer(s)	Length
1.	"When Love Calls Your Name"	Tom Snow, Jimmy Scott	4:03
2.	"Love Has Made The Difference" (*)	Kim Boyce, Tommy Sims, Gary Koreiba	3:42
3.	"Everything"	K. Boyce, Scott MacLeod, Trace Scarborough	4:36
4.	"Dancin' to the Beat of Your Heart"	K. Boyce, Bo Cooper, Todd Cooper, Vernon Bishop	3:41
5.	"Until Now"	K. Boyce, B. Cooper, Bryan Lenox	4:04
6.	"Facts of Love"	Simon Climie, Rob Fisher, Dennis Morgan	4:35
7.	"Hurting People" (*)	K. Boyce, Julius Drummin	4:08
8.	"I Just Wanna Live Right" (*)	Allan Todd Koppelberger	4:17
9.	"Let's Stay Together" (*)	K. Boyce, G. Koreiba, Phil Sillas	3:41
10.	"Thank You for Being My Friend" (*)	K. Boyce, G, Koreiba, S. MacLeod, T. Scarborough	4:52

Note: (*) – tracks produced by Brian Tankersley; all other songs produced by Bryan Lenox.

== Personnel ==
- Kim Boyce – vocals, backing vocals (2, 7–9)
- Mike Lawler – keyboards (1, 6), Hammond B3 organ (6)
- Bryan Lenox – keyboards (1, 5, 6), backing vocals (4), pipe organ (5), strings (5), bass (5), drums (5), oboe (5)
- Scott Sheriff – keyboards (1)
- Bo Cooper – keyboards (2, 8, 9), acoustic piano (4, 5), additional keyboards (10)
- Trace Scarborough – keyboards (3, 5, 10), bass (3, 10), track arrangements (3, 10)
- Tony Harrell – keyboards (4)
- Phil Madeira – Hammond B3 organ (4)
- Paul Mills – acoustic piano (8)
- Dann Huff – guitars (1, 3, 5, 6)
- Michael Hodge – guitars (2, 10)
- George Cocchini – guitars (4, 7, 9)
- Gordon Kennedy – guitars (6)
- Dale Oliver – guitars (8, 9)
- Mike Brignardello – bass (1)
- Brian Tankersley – bass (2, 7–9), drums (2, 7–9), keyboards (7, 8)
- Scott MacLeod – bass (3, 10), drums (3, 10), percussion (3, 10), track arrangements (3, 10)
- Jackie Street – bass (4)
- Tommy Sims – bass (6)
- Mark Hammond – drums (1)
- Steve Brewster – drums (4, 6)
- Eric Darken – percussion (1, 4–6)
- Marty Paoletta – saxophone solo (3)
- Todd Cooper – saxophone solo (4), backing vocals (4)
- Jeff Kirk – baritone saxophone (4)
- Mark Pogue – backing vocals (1, 5, 6), BGV arrangements (1, 5)
- Chris Rodriguez – backing vocals (1, 2, 4–7)
- Gary Koreiba – backing vocals (2, 4, 6, 10)
- Guy Penrod – backing vocals (2, 7, 10)
- Vicki Hampton – backing vocals (3, 6)
- Carl Lucero – backing vocals (3), BGV arrangements (3)
- Kristina Clark – backing vocals (7)

Production and technical

- Neal Joseph – executive producer (1, 3–6)
- Bryan Lenox – recording (1, 3–6), mixing (1, 3–6)
- Bill Deaton – tracking engineer (1)
- Patrick Kelly – mixing (1, 3–6)
- Brian Tankersley – recording (2, 7–10), mixing (2, 7–10)
- Pasquale Del Villagio – assistant engineer (1, 3–6)
- Amy Hughes – assistant engineer
- Rich Indelicato – assistant engineer (1, 3–6)
- Scott Lenox – assistant engineer (1, 3–6)
- Graham Lewis – assistant engineer (1, 3–6)
- Jeff Neely – assistant engineer (1, 3–6)
- Carry Summers – assistant engineer (1, 3–6)
- Greg Parker – assistant engineer (2, 7–10)
- Hank Williams – mastering at MasterMix (Nashville, Tennessee)
- Julie Johnston – production assistant (1, 3–6)
- Audrey Lenox – production assistant (1, 3–6)
- Joan Tankersley – image stylist
- Glenn Parsons – design
- Kevin Break – photography
- Carter Bradley – hair, make-up
- Sasser & Cavney Entertainment – management

== Charts ==
Chart (1992)	Peak position
US Top Christian Albums (Billboard)	16

=== Radio singles ===
Year	Singles	Peak positions	
Year	Singles	CCM AC	CCM CHR
1992	"When Love Calls Your Name"	4	12
1992	"Everything"	2	—
1992–93	"Facts of Love"	—	6
1993	"Until Now"	10	—
1993	"Love Has Made the Difference	19	3
1993	"Thank You for Being My Friend"	32	—
1993	"Dancin' to the Beat of Your Heart"	—	9
