= Vince Ebo =

American singer (1954–1993)

- Born: 17 May 1954; Honolulu, Hawaii
- Died: 14 December 1993 (aged 39)
- Cause of death: Suicide
- Genres: Christian R&B
- Occupations: Singer, songwriter
- Instruments: Vocals, saxophone
- Labels: Warner Bros. Records, Warner Alliance
- Formerly of: East Wind, Jubilee, Sun Bear, Menagerie, Vision, The Fit, Charlie Peacock Acoustic Trio

Vincent Jerome Ebo was a soul and pop singer. He was also a session singer and sang backup on various artists albums. He was a member of the duo, The Fit. As a solo artist, he found success on the Contemporary Christian music scene where he had three chart hits.

== Background ==
Ebo was originally from Honolulu, Hawaii. During his childhood, he and his family relocated to Sacramento.

His career involved working as a model, TV and movie appearances, working on recordings for the A&M and Warner Brothers labels, appearances on Soul Train etc. It was in the 1980s that he performed in the groups Sun Bear with Roger Smith and The Fits with Chuck Gentry. He found frequent work as a session musician, working with artists such as Ben E. King, Todd Rundgren, Michael W. Smith and Russ Taff.

Ebo would work with producers, Trace Scarborough and Scott MacLeod who would write "What You Do" for Margaret Bell, and Macleod would write "By Faith" for Kim Boyce.

His album, Love Is the Better Way is at No. 393 in the "CCM's 500 Best Albums of All Time" list.

His vocal style had been described as an encompassment of influences from Luther Vandross, Peabo Bryson and Teddy Pendergrass.

== Career ==
=== 1970s ===
In 1976, Ebo was the lead singer in the band East Wind, a group he was in while still in high school. By 1976, they were playing at the Parking Lot club in Sacramento. They were managed by Roy Arimoto. Other members were, Orland King, Brian King, Skip Martin, Dave Karacozoff and Mark Jasper. According to an article in The California Aggie, they were one of the best sounding bands in Northern California. According to the State Hornet newspaper, Ebo also played trumpet in the band. The group released the single, "Read The Fine Print" bw "Talk to Me" on Golden Groove 113-33 in 1976. The A side was composed by Lawrence Gee and the B side was composed by Gee and Ebo.

After Ebo's time with East Wind, he was with a group called Jubilee. He left Jubilee and became the lead singer of the TCA recording act, Sun Bear. He was also a member of another group called Menagerie. After that, he returned to Jubilee which had changed its name to Visions. By 1979, Ebo was the lead singer of the Sacramento-based group Visions who had built a good reputation for themselves on the Sacramento night club scene with their mix of popular, rock and soul music. Also in the group were John Davis on guitar, Mark Ishikawa on keyboards, Brian Clark on drums and Brad Garrett on bass. The group's repertoire included a couple of George Benson covers. On 5 May at 8 pm, they were appearing with Elvin Bishop's band, the West Coast Shieks at Jones Hall at the Placer County Fairgrounds. Enabling the event was Roseville record store, Dimple Records.

=== 1980s ===
It was reported in the 28 November 1987 issue of Billboard that former guitarist and musical director for the group Shalamar had begun production on a solo album for the Belair / A&M label. The vocalist on the album was Vince Ebo and the sound engineer was Tom Root.

Ebo and instrumentalist Chuck Gentry were members of The Fit. They recorded "Just Havin' Fun" which was composed by Chuck Gentry and Lee Peters and "I Wanna Know" which was composed by Gentry and Ebo. The songs were released on A&M AM-3007 in early 1988. With A&M Records said to be getting ready for an active 1988 in black music, their latest contribution with act, The Fit and its song "Just Havin' Fun" was mentioned in the 12 March 1988 issue of Billboard. The single was already had been active in the Hot Black Singles chart, having debuted at No. 79 for week of 13 February. The song eventually peaked at No. 22 on the chart.

Also, in 1988 Charlie Peacock, Jimmy Abegg and Ebo made up the Charlie Peacock Acoustic Trio. Through their musical efforts came the West Coast Diaries tapes.

=== 1990s ===
In 1990, Ebo was performing alongside Marlynn Smith, performing in the musical Right Mind is Nowhere. Along with Marlynn Smith, he was covering genres such as pop, jazz and opera.

Ebo, Charlie Peacock and Jimmy Abegg wrote the song "Thin but Strong Cord" which was credited to Abegg. The song featured Ebo and Peacock trading vocals with Abegg. The song peaked at No. 2 for the week of 16 September 1991 on the Christian Hits chart during its sixteen-week run.

From March to April 1992, Ebo joined Charlie Peacock on Peacocks " "Love Life" tour that lasted until April. The tour covered more than 40 cities across America.

It had been reported in the 4 April issue of Cash Box that Ebo along with the Brooklyn Tabernacle Choir had been signed to the Warner Alliance label.

==== "Make it Work" ====
Ebo recorded "Make It Work", a song he co-wrote with Tommy Sims. It debuted the Christian chart for the week of 20 April 1992. It peaked at No. 3 during its eleven-week run. The video for the song was a "Video Pick of the Week" in the 13 June issue of Cash Box.

It was reported in the 2 May issue of Cash Box that Warner Alliance artist Ebo having embarked on a solo career, had released his Love is a Better Way album.

==== Debut album ====
Ebo's album Love is the Better Way was reviewed in the 16 May issue of Cash Box. The reviewer described Ebo as having enormous vocal talents and the album would be one of the success stories for 1992. The music on the album was mixture of smooth ballads and funk-filled urban jams. The songs picked for mention were "Love Is the Better Way", "It's Over", "Real Love" and "Love". Those songs were recommended as adds for the urban and quiet storm formats. The album was also at No. 3 on the Cash Box Gospel Music New Releases list that week.

==== Further activities ====
Ebo recorded "Forgiven", a song he co-wrote with Trace Scarborough and Scott MacLeod. The song debuted on the Christian chart for the week of 3 August 1992. Spending ten weeks on the chart, it peaked at No. 4 for the week of 14 September.

It was reported in both the 23 January 1993 issues of Cash Box and Billboard that the song "Hard Hearted Act" that Ebo both wrote and performed on had been selected for the daytime soap opera Guiding Light.

On 1 March 1993, Ebo was dropped from the Warner Alliance roster.

He recorded "(I Will Not Be) Shaken", which was written by himself, Scott MacLeod and Trace Scarborough. It made it to No. 14 on 1 November 1993 during its nine-week run on the Christian chart.

In the later part of 1993, Ebo had been active in various things. He was performing with a quartet from San Francisco called, S.F.O. and a book about his life and faith, loosely titled Love Is the Better Way which was also the title of his album. He has also been selected for the role of national spokesman for Project Impact, a program for at risk youth. His video "Make it Work" was to become the new slogan and soundtrack in an infomercial for the organization. Having completed work on 15 new songs, he was looking around for a new record deal.

On 13 December, Ebo performed for 600 graduates and family members of the Project Impact program. This was his last public appearance.

== Personal life ==
Ebo was engaged to singer Kim Fleming.

== Death ==
Ebo died from what had been described as a self-inflicted shotgun wound to the head at a time between December 14 and December 15, 1993.

His memorial was held at Christ Community Church in Franklin, Tennessee on 4 January 1994. The minister was Pastor Scotty Smith. Speakers included Charlie Peacock and Jeff Willett of Star Song. Ebo's fiancée Kim Fleming sang the closing hymn. "Amazing Grace".
