= What You Do (Margaret Bell song) =

Song by Margaret Bell

from the album Over and Over
- Released: 1992
- Recorded: 1991
- Label: Warner Alliance
- Composers: Trace Scarborough, Scott Macleod, Chris Rodriguez

"What You Do" is a 1992 single by Margaret Bell from Bell's 1991 album, Over and Over. It registered nationally on the CCM chart the following year.

== Background ==
"What You Do" was written by Trace Scarborough, Scott MacLeod and Chris Rodriguez. The song was produced by Scott MacLeod and Trace Scarborough. It is included on Bell's album, Over and Over that was released in 1991.

== Reception ==
In a review of Margaret Bell's Over and Over album, Chris Berry of CR Magazine referred to the album as delightful which would put most Whitney Houston tracks to shame. "What You Do" was one of the two "out-and-out dance tracks" on the album.

== Charts ==
=== CCM chart ===
"What You Do" debuted on the CCM chart for the week of 10 February 1992. Spending fourteen weeks on the chart, it peaked at No. 9 on the week of 13 April.

=== WJTL chart ===
"What You Do" debuted at No. 37 on the WJTL chart for the week of 9 March 1992. In its eighth week on the WJTL chart, it peaked at No. 3 for the week of 27 April. It stayed on the chart for an additional week.

== Personnel ==
- Bass - Tommy Sims
- Drums - Scott MacLeod
- Keyboards Trace Scarborough
- Keyboards - Steven Ford
- Percussion - Scott MacLeod
- Background vocals - Mervyn Warren
- Background Vocals - Chris Rodriguez
- Background vocals - Mark Kibble
- Vocals - Margaret Bell
