= By Faith =

Studio album by Kim Boyce
- Released: 1994
- Studio: Playground Recording Studios, OmniSound Studios and Sound Stage Studios (Nashville, Tennessee); Manzanita Recording (Arrington, Tennessee)
- Genre: CCM, Christian pop, adult contemporary
- Length: 41:22
- Label: Warner Alliance
- Producer: Bill Cuomo; Robert White Johnson; Bryan Lenox

Kim Boyce chronology
Facts of Love (1992)	By Faith (1994)	As I Am (1997)

Professional ratings
Review scores
Source	Rating
Cross Rhythms	5/10 stars

By Faith is the sixth studio album by American Christian singer-songwriter Kim Boyce. It is her second and final album on the Warner Alliance label released in 1994. The album is more adult contemporary, leaving behind her dance pop sound of her previous albums. A music video was made for the second single "Not Too Far From Here." Boyce dedicated the album to her first born son Gary Lee. Boyce released her first all Spanish-language album of By Faith called Por Fe a year later. Bill Cuomo and Robert White Johnson produced three tracks while Bryan Lenox produced the rest of the album.

== Track listing ==
No.	Title	Writer(s)	Length
1.	"Tell Me"	Kim Boyce, Bill Cuomo, Robert White Johnson	4:10
2.	"Oh What a Love" (*)	K. Boyce, R. Johnson, Scott Sheriff	3:50
3.	"By Faith"	Chris Rice, Scott MacLeod	4:22
4.	"Not Too Far from Here"	Steve Siler, Ty Lacy	3:54
5.	"Just Believe"	Brian Tankersley, Judson Spence	4:47
6.	"After God's Own Heart" (*)	Carolyn Arends, Joe Beck	3:55
7.	"Rescue Me"	K. Boyce, Tommy Greer	3:40
8.	"Dreams I'm Dreamin'"	K. Boyce, Bo Cooper	4:33
9.	"Imagine a Love"	Eric Champion	3:50
10.	"Shelter Me with Love" (*)	K. Boyce, Gary Lunn	4:21

Note: (*) – produced by Bill Cuomo and Robert White Johnson. All other tracks were produced by Bryan Lenox.

== Personnel ==
- Kim Boyce – lead vocals, backing vocals (1, 3–5, 7–9)
- Dennis Patton – programming (1, 3, 7, 9), sequencing (1, 3, 7, 9)
- Bryan Lenox – additional keyboards (1, 3–5, 7–9), synth bass (1, 3–5, 7–9), additional drums (1, 3–5, 7–9), percussion (1, 3–5, 7–9)
- Phil Madeira – Hammond B3 organ (1, 3–5, 7–9)
- Bill Cuomo – keyboards (2, 6, 10), programming (2, 6, 10), bass (2, 6, 10)
- Bo Cooper – acoustic piano (4, 8), keyboards (4, 8)
- Jerry McPherson – guitars (1–4, 6–10)
- Brent Rowan – guitars (5)
- Jackie Street – bass (1, 3–5, 7–9)
- Chris McHugh – drums (1, 3–5, 7–9)
- Wayne Killius – drums (2, 6, 10)
- Marty Paoletta – saxophone (1, 3–5, 7–9)
- Mark Douthit – saxophone (2, 6, 10)
- Ronn Huff – string arrangements and conductor (1, 3–5, 7–9)
- Nashville String Machine – strings (1, 3–5, 7–9)
- Eric Champion – backing vocals (1, 3–5, 7–9)
- Gary Koreiba – backing vocals (1, 3–5, 7–9)
- Angelo Petrucci – backing vocals (1, 3–5, 7–9)
- Veronica Petrucci – backing vocals (1, 3–5, 7–9)
- Mark Pogue – backing vocals (1, 3–5, 7–9)
- Chris Rodriguez – backing vocals (1, 3–5, 7–9)
- Nicol Smith – backing vocals (1, 3–5, 7–9)
- Robert White Johnson – backing vocals (2, 6, 10)
- Kim Keyes – backing vocals (2, 6, 10)

Production and Technical

- Eric Wyse – executive producer, A&R direction
- Gregg Jampol – track recording (1, 3–5, 7–9), overdub recording (1, 3–5, 7–9), string recording (1, 3–5, 7–9), additional mixing (1, 3–5, 7–9)
- Bryan Lenox – track recording (1, 3–5, 7–9), overdub recording (1, 3–5, 7–9), string recording (1, 3–5, 7–9), mixing (1, 3–5, 7–9)
- Scott Lenox – overdub recording (1, 3–5, 7–9), string recording (1, 3–5, 7–9), second engineer (1, 3–5, 7–9), production assistant (1, 3–5, 7–9)
- Bill Cuomo – recording (2, 6, 10), mixing (2, 6, 10)
- Mark Ralston – second engineer (1, 3–5, 7–9)
- Aaron Swihart – second engineer (1, 3–5, 7–9), additional mixing (1, 3–5, 7–9)
- Hank Williams – mastering at MasterMix (Nashville, Tennessee)
- Laura LiPuma-Nash – art direction
- Glenn Parsons – design
- Peter Nash – photography

== Radio singles ==
Year	Singles	Peak positions	
Year	Singles	CCM AC	CCM CHR
1994–95	"By Faith"	1	3
1995	"Not Too Far from Here"	3	—
1995	"Tell Me"	27	—
