= Over and Over (Margaret Bell album) =

Studio album by Margaret Bell
- Released: 1991
- Studios: Recording: OmniSound Studios, Quad Studios, Javelina Recording Studios, Midtown Studios Mixing: Fox Run Studios, Knightlight Studios
- Labels: Warner Alliance WBD-4103; Reprise 9 26345-2
- Producers: Benjamin Winans; David Ebensberger; Scott MacLeod; Tim Miner; Trace Scarborough

Over and Over is a 1991 album by Margaret Bell. It was released on the Warner Alliance and Reprise labels. The album contains the chart hits, "Any Day Any Minute Now" and "What You Do".

== Reception ==
The album had a positive review in the 7 September 1991 issue of Cash Box. The reviewer wrote that she displayed the same vocal dexterity as her sister Vanessa Bell Armstrong. The reviewer also wrote that the album made a strong debut in the urban contemporary gospel arena and had strong crossover potential.

The album was reviewed by Chris Berry of CR Magazine. He referred to the album as "an utterly delightful album which would put most Whitney Houston tracks to shame. "Any Day Any Minute Now" and "What You Do" were the two "out-and-out dance tracks" on the album. He also called "Holding On to You" as beautiful and endearing. He gave the album a ten out of ten rating.

== Charts ==
The album peaked at No. 23 on the Billboard Top Gospel Albums chart.

== Singles ==
"Any Day Any Minute Now" peaked at No. 3 on the CCM chart for the week of 11 November 1991. "What You Do" peaked at No. 14 on the CCM chart for the week of 13 April 1992.

"Crazy When It Comes to You" was at No. 1 on the Cash Box Bobby Jones Top 5 Videos chart for the week of 9 May. The chart wasn't published for the week of 16 May. With the chart back for the week of 23 May, "Crazy When It Comes to You" was at No. 3. The chart was absent for the week of 20 June. "Crazy When It Comes to You" was at No. 2 on the Cash Box Bobby Jones Top 5 Videos chart for the week of 27 June 1992. It was still on the chart at No. 4 for the week of 11 July.

== Tracklist ==
1. "Any Day Any Minute Now" - 5:12
2. "Holding On to You" - 4:33
3. "What You Do" - 3:59
4. "Over And Over 5:00
5. "I Choose to Be a Believer" - 4:39
6. I Trust in You" - 4:28
7. "Here With You" - 4:13
8. "Crazy When It Comes to You" - 4:29
9. "What Love" - 3:43
10. "Lay It All on Him" - 3:59
