= Love Is You to Me =

Studio album by Kim Boyce
- Released: 1989
- Studios: GBT Studio and Bill Schnee Studios (Hollywood, California); Oakshire Recorders (Los Angeles, California); Knightlight Studios (Dallas, Texas)
- Genres: CCM, dance pop, adult contemporary
- Length: 40:26
- Labels: Myrrh, Word
- Producers: Brian Tankersley; Rhett Lawrence; Tim Miner

Kim Boyce chronology
Time and Again (1988)	Love Is You to Me (1989)	This I Know (1990)

Professional ratings
Review scores
Source	Rating
AllMusic	2/5 stars

Love Is You to Me is the third studio album by American Christian singer and songwriter Kim Boyce, released in 1989 on Myrrh Records. Highlights include a duet with the Imperials on the title song, which Boyce co-wrote with member Jimmie Lee Sloas and a cover of Keith Green's "O Lord You're Beautiful". Brian Tankersley, who produced Boyce's first two albums, produced six songs, Rhett Lawrence produced three songs and Christian singer-songwriter Tim Miner produced and co-wrote the track "Tender Heart". The album debuted and peaked at number 13 on the Billboard Top Inspirational Albums chart.

== Track listing ==
No.	Title	Writer(s)	Length
1.	"Holding My Hand"	Kim Boyce, Brian Tankersley, Stacey O'Brien	3:46
2.	"For Every Lonely Heart"	Claire Cloninger, Phil Sillas	4:01
3.	"Love Is You to Me" (duet with The Imperials)	K. Boyce, Jimmie Lee Sloas	3:37
4.	"Dancin' My Heart Away"	BeBe Winans	4:06
5.	"Faith"	Denny Correll, Rhett Lawrence	3:48
6.	"Tender Heart"	K. Boyce, Tim Miner	5:03
7.	"Best Friend"	K. Boyce, R. Lawrence, S. O'Brien, Denny Bouchard	3:32
8.	"O Lord You're Beautiful"	Keith Green	4:50
9.	"I'm Asking You" (featuring Bryan Duncan)	K. Boyce, John Andrew Schreiner	3:37
10.	"It Always Comes Back to You"	Blue Weaver	4:06

Note: The tracks "Dancin' My Heart Away," "Faith" and "Best Friend" were produced by Rhett Lawrence. "Tender Heart" was produced by Tim Miner. All other tracks were produced by Brian Tankersley.

== Personnel ==
Musicians and Vocalists

- Kim Boyce – vocals, backing vocals (2, 4–7, 10)
- Brian Tankersley – keyboards (1–3), synth bass (1, 2), drums (1–3, 8, 9), backing vocals (1, 8, 9), percussion (3), bass (8)
- Phil Silas – keyboards (2), synth bass (2)
- Jimmie Lee Sloas – keyboards (3)
- Rhett Lawrence – keyboards (4, 5, 7), Fairlight CMI (4, 5, 7), bass (4, 5, 7), drums (4, 5, 7), backing vocals (4)
- Tim Miner – keyboards (6), backing vocals (6)
- John Andrew Schreiner – keyboards (8–10)
- Michael Hodge – guitars (1–5, 7, 10)
- Tommy Sims – guitars (6), bass (6), backing vocals (6)
- Spencer Campbell – electric bass (1, 2), bass (3)
- Kirk Whalum – saxophone (2, 8, 9)
- David Boruff – saxophone (4)
- Kristina Clark – backing vocals (1, 8)
- Carrie McDowell Hodge – backing vocals (1, 8)
- The Imperials – vocals (3)
- Cindy Cruse – backing vocals (6)
- Don Wallace – backing vocals (6)
- Bryan Duncan – guest vocals (9)

Arrangements

- Brian Tankersley – arrangements (2, 8, 10)
- Phil Silas – arrangements (2)
- Jimmie Lee Sloas – arrangements (3)
- Rhett Lawrence – arrangements (4, 5, 7)
- Tim Miner – vocal arrangements (6)
- Don Wallace – vocal arrangements (6)
- John Andrew Schreiner – arrangements (8, 10)

=== Production ===
- Mark Maxwell – executive producer
- Brian Tankersley – executive producer, recording (1–3, 8–10), mixing (1–3, 8–10)
- Dan Garcia – recording (4, 5, 7), mixing (4, 5, 7)
- Rhett Lawrence – recording (4, 5, 7)
- David Ebensberger – recording (6)
- Tim Miner – recording (6)
- Win Kutz – mixing (6)
- Ken Allardyce – assistant engineer (1–3, 5, 9, 10)
- Luis Chi-Sing – assistant engineer (1–4, 7, 9, 10)
- Brian Gardner – mastering at Bernie Grundman Mastering (Hollywood, California)
- Joan Tankersley – art direction
- Janice Watson – design
- Laurie Fink – cover coordinator
- Bonnie Lewis – photography

== Charts ==
Chart (1989)	Peak position
US Inspirational Albums (Billboard)	13

=== Radio singles ===
Year	Singles	Peak positions	
Year	Singles	CCM AC	CCM CHR
1989	"For Every Lonely Heart"	10	16
1989	"Faith"	6	13
1990	"Tender Heart"	22	6
1990	"Love Is You to Me" (with The Imperials)	15	8
