= Tender Heart =

Tender Heart may refer to:

- Tender Heart (Mia Dyson album)
- Tender Heart (Lionel Richie song)
- Tender Heart (Kim Boyce song), 1990
- Phantom Queen, a film also known as Tender Heart
