= Time and Again (Kim Boyce album) =

Studio album by Kim Boyce
- Released: 1988
- Studio: Cat Head Studio (Los Angeles, California); OmniSound Studios and MasterMix (Nashville, Tennessee); Rivendell Recorders (Houston, Texas)
- Genre: CCM, dance pop
- Length: 38:09
- Label: Myrrh, Word
- Producer: Brian Tankersley

Kim Boyce chronology
Kim Boyce (1986)	Time and Again (1988)	Love Is You to Me (1989)

Professional ratings
Review scores
Source	Rating
AllMusic	4.5/5 stars

Time and Again is the second studio album by American Christian singer Kim Boyce, released in 1988 on Myrrh Records.Time and Again features her cover of Rare Earth's 1971 Top 10 hit "I Just Want to Celebrate," which was a Top 5 hit on Christian radio. The album reached the top 10 on the Billboard Top Inspirational Albums chart.

== Track listing ==
No.	Title	Writer(s)	Length
1.	"I Just Want to Celebrate"	Dino Fekaris, Nick Zessus	3:35
2.	"Not for Me"	Kim Boyce, Jimmie Lee Sloas	4:05
3.	"You Can Be Mine"	K. Boyce, George Cocchino	4:42
4.	"Say It"	K. Boyce, Brian Tankersley	3:34
5.	"Lovin' You"	K. Boyce, B. Tankersley	4:24
6.	"Save Me" (featuring Jimmie Lee Sloas of The Imperials)	K. Boyce, B. Tankersley	4:42
7.	"Lonely Man"	K. Boyce, Trent Dean	4:23
8.	"Stop Fighting"	James Hollihan, Jr.	5:03
9.	"You're Always There"	K. Boyce, Susie Allanson	4:00

== Personnel ==
Musicians

- Kim Boyce – vocals
- Brian Tankersley – keyboards (1, 4–6), bass (1, 4–6), drum programming (1–7, 9), acoustic guitar (3)
- Jimmie Lee Sloas – electric piano (2), bass (2)
- John Andrew Schreiner – additional keyboards (2), keyboards (3, 9), bass (3, 9)
- Trent Dean – keyboards (7), drum programming (7)
- James Hollihan Jr. – keyboards (8), guitars (8), drum programming (8)
- George Cocchini – guitars (1, 4, 5, 9), acoustic guitar (3), electric guitar (3)
- David Zycheck – guitars (2, 6)
- Spencer Campbell – bass (7, 8)
- Kirk Whalum – saxophone (1, 2, 5, 7), soprano saxophone (9)

Background vocals

- Kim Boyce – backing vocals (1–6, 8)
- Chris Rodriguez – backing vocals (1, 4, 6)
- Jimmie Lee Sloas – backing vocals (1, 4, 6), vocals (6)
- Judson Spence – backing vocals (1, 4, 6)
- Brian Tankersley – backing vocals (1, 6)

Arrangements

- Brian Tankersley –arrangements (1, 4–7)
- Jimmie Lee Sloas – arrangements (2)
- George Cocchini –arrangements (3)
- Trent Dean – arrangements (7)
- James Hollihan Jr. – arrangements (8)
- John Andrew Schreiner – arrangements (9)

=== Production ===
- Mark Maxwell – A&R direction
- Brian Tankersley – producer, recording, mixing
- Joan Tankersley – art direction, styling
- Phillip Spencer – design, lettering
- Victoria Pearson – all photography
- John Keoni – hair
- Carter Bradley – make-up
- Mike Dixon – management

== Charts ==
Chart (1988)	Peak position
US Inspirational Albums (Billboard)	10

=== Radio singles ===
Year	Singles	Peak positions	
Year	Singles	CCM AC	CCM CHR
1988	"You Can Be Mine"	4	—
1988	I Just Want to Celebrate"	2	2
1988	"Not for Me"	15	3
1988	"Save Me" (with Jimmie Lee Sloas)	—	15
1988	"You're Always There"	8	15
1989	"Lovin' You"	37	8

== Music videos ==
Boyce also released a companion video on VHS titled Time and Again Videos featuring music videos for "I Just Want to Celebrate" and "Not for Me" plus a backstage interview.
