= Make It Work =

Make it Work may refer to:

== Songs ==
- "Make It Work", 1992. A song by Vince Ebo
- "Make it Work", by Christina Grimmie from With Love
- "Make it Work", by Majid Jordan from Majid Jordan
- "Make it Work", by Ne-Yo from Because of You
- "Make it Work", by Keke Wyatt from Rated Love

== Other ==
- A catchphrase used by fashion designer and television personality Tim Gunn
