= As I Am (Kim Boyce album) =

Studio album by Kim Boyce
- Released: 1997
- Studio: The Playground, OmniSound Studios, Sidekick Sound Studios and The Velvet Ballroom (Nashville, Tennessee)
- Genre: CCM, adult contemporary, Christian pop
- Length: 40:06
- Label: Diadem Music Group, Benson
- Producer: Bryan Lenox; James Hollihan, Jr.

Kim Boyce chronology
By Faith (1994)	As I Am (1997)	The Definitive Collection (2007)

As I Am is the seventh and, to date, final studio album by American Christian singer-songwriter Kim Boyce. It is her first and only release on Diadem Music Group, distributed by Benson Records in 1997. Like her previous album By Faith, As I Am continues her adult contemporary sound. Boyce duets with her husband Gary Koreiba on the track "Amazing Love for Me". Production duties were done by Bryan Lenox while James Hollihan Jr. (Russ Taff) produced the track "The Sound of Your Voice".

== Track listing ==
No.	Title	Writer(s)	Length
1.	"You"	Kim Boyce, Bo Cooper	3:58
2.	"Who Hung the Moon"	B. Cooper, Todd Cooper	4:01
3.	"As I Am"	Ty Lacy, Madeline Stone	3:46
4.	"The World Within"	Michael Puryear, Steve Siler	3:33
5.	"Remember Me (The Communion Song)"	T. Lacy, Connie Harrington	3:37
6.	"I Fall in Love"	K. Boyce, Tom Hemby	4:11
7.	"Peace"	S. Siler, T. Lacy	4:41
8.	"Nothing in the World"	Cory Ridenhour, John Mandeville, Marshall Hall	3:11
9.	"Amazing Love for Me" (duet with Gary Koreiba)	K. Boyce, Scott Krippayne, Tony Wood	4:18
10.	"The Sound of Your Voice"	K. Boyce, S. Siler, James Hollihan, Jr.	4:45

Note: "The Sound of Your Voice" was produced by James Hollihan Jr. All other tracks were produced by Bryan Lenox.

== Personnel ==
Musicians

- Kim Boyce – vocals
- Pat Coil – keyboards (1, 6), acoustic piano (2, 4, 7), keyboard pad (3), Hammond B3 organ (8)
- Dennis Patton – keyboards (2), percussion (2, 4), Hammond B3 organ (4), acoustic piano (6), accordion (6), programming (9)
- Bo Cooper – acoustic piano (3, 5)
- Marc Q. Harris – acoustic piano (8)
- James Hollihan Jr. – acoustic piano (10), arrangements (10)
- Mark Baldwin – acoustic guitar (1–4, 7), acoustic 12-string guitar (6), guitars (8)
- Jerry McPherson – electric guitar (1–4, 7), Hawaiian guitar (2), all electric guitars (6), guitars (8)
- Glenn Pearce – guitar solo (1), acoustic guitar (4, 7), guitars (9)
- Matt Slocum – electric guitar (4), cello (7)
- Danny O'Lannerghty – bass (1–4, 6–8)
- Matt Pierson – bass (10)
- John Hammond – drums (1–4, 6–8), percussion (6)
- Steve Grossman – drums (10)
- Eric Darken – percussion (1, 3, 6, 7)
- Bryan Lenox – percussion (1, 3, 5, 6)
- Matt Davich – woodwinds (10)
- Robbie Shankle – woodwinds (10)
- Leslie Norton – French horn (10)
- Chris McDonald – string arrangements and conductor (2, 3, 5)
- John Darnall – string conductor (10)
- Nashville String Machine – strings (2, 3, 5, 10)

Background vocals

- Michael English – backing vocals (1)
- Gary Koreiba – backing vocals (1, 6), vocals (9)
- Bo Cooper – backing vocals (2)
- Todd Cooper – backing vocals (2)

Choir on "Nothing in the World"

- Marshall Hall, Nikki Hassman, Gary Koreiba, Nicol Smith and Todd Smith

=== Production ===
- Larry Day – executive producer
- Bryan Lenox – engineer (1–9), mixing (1–9)
- James Hollihan Jr. – recording (10), mixing (10)
- Rob Burrell – assistant engineer (1–9), production assistant (1–9)
- Amanda Seers – assistant engineer (1–9)
- Aaron Swihart – assistant engineer (1–9)
- Lynn Fuston – additional engineer (10)
- Mike Rapp – art direction
- Robert Ascroft – design
- Chris Nichols – photography
- Jamie Kearney – stylist
- Carol Maxwell – hair, make-up

== Critical reception ==
Professional ratings
Review scores
Source	Rating
Cross Rhythms	7/10 stars

Mike Rimmer of Cross Rhythms praised the album saying that "motherhood brings a new source of inspiration, reflected in many of the songs. 'Who Hung The Moon' is a child's question that brings Kim back to the wonder of creation in a jazz-tinged piece of MOR! There's more jazz when she turns in a stunning lounge singer performance on 'The Sound Of Your Voice'. Clearly the adult Kim is pushing out the musical boat and enjoying herself! One ballad stands out, the beautiful 'Remember Me', which is a communion song and has a touch of Whitney about it. Just a gorgeous song. The duet with husband Gary Koreiba "Amazing Love For Me" is another song born out of Kim's experience of parenting, this time a realisation of how much the Father gave to us in sending Jesus."

== Radio singles ==
Year	Singles	Peak positions
Year	Singles	CCM AC
1997	"The World Within"	21
1997	"Amazing Love for Me" (with Gary Koreiba)	32
