= (I Will Not Be) Shaken =

Song by Vince Ebo

from the album Love Is the Better Way
- A-side: "(I Will Not Be) Shaken"
- Released: 1992
- Length: 4:53
- Label: Warner Alliance
- Composers: Vince Ebo, Scott MacLeod, Trace Scarborough

US chronology
"Forgiven" (1992)	"(I Will Not Be) Shaken" (1992)

"(I Will Not Be) Shaken" is a 1992 song by Vince Ebo. The song was more in the rock music genre than Ebo's other songs. It made the Christian music chart that year. It was also nominated for a Dove Award.

== Background ==
"(I Will Not Be) Shaken" was written by Vince Ebo, Scott MacLeod and Trace Scarborough. It was released in 1992. The song appears on Ebo's Love Is the Better Way album that was released that year.

The song was nominated for a Dove Award in 1993 in the Rock Recorded Song category.

== Charts ==
=== WJTL ===
"(I Will Not Be) Shaken" debuted at No. 36 on the WJTL chart for the week of 26 October 1992. In its eighth charting week, for the week of 14 December, it peaked at No. 7. This was also the song's final chart entry.

=== CCM Contemporary Hits ===
The song debuted on the Christian Hits chart on 16 November 1992. It peaked at No. 4 on 11 January 1993 during its nine-week run on the chart.
