= Tim Miner =

American songwriter

Tim Miner is an American gospel/R&B singer-songwriter and instrumentalist. He has also produced, arranged, and/or composed music for/with many other artists.

Miner released three albums on Christian labels in the 1980s before releasing a self-titled album on Motown Records, which is a reworking of his previous album, True Story, with new material.

== Discography ==
- 1984: Tim Miner (Nissi Records)
- 1988: I Know You Think You Know (Sparrow Records) U.S. Billboard CC No. 24
- 1990: True Story (Frontline Records) U.S. CC No. 31
- 1992: Tim Miner (Motown Records)
- 2004: Not White Enuff (Dream Nation Entertainment)
- 2006: Melody of Love (Dream Nation Entertainment)
- 2007: I Dream in Living Color (Dream Nation Entertainment)

=== Other credits ===
Writer

- 1986: "Here" on Kim Boyce's self-titled debut album
- 1987: "Isn't It Crazy" on Leon Patillo's Brand New
- 1989: "Tender Heart" co-writer on Kim Boyce's Love Is You to Me
- 1991: "Give Me a Chance" on David Peaston's Mixed Emotions
- 1994: "Any Way You Wanna Go" on CeCe Peniston's Thought 'Ya Knew
- 1994: "Missing You" & "Anyway" on Steve Perry's For the Love of Strange Medicine
- 1995: "Cry for Me" on Paula Abdul's Head Over Heels
- 1997: "Father and a Friend" on Crystal Lewis's Let Love In
- 2000: "Key to the Kingdom" on The Whites' A Lifetime in the Making
- 2011: "Only Thing I Ever Get for Christmas" on Justin Bieber's Under the Mistletoe Araon Pearce Producer

Producer

- 1990: This I Know Kim Boyce (also keyboards)
- 1992: New Direction DeLeon (also bass, composer, drums, and keyboards)
- 1992: Love Is Reality Al Green (also arranger, bass, and keyboards)
- 1992: How Time Flies Wayne Watson (also bass, percussion, and background vocals)
- 1994: For the Love of Strange Medicine Steve Perry (also bass, composer, and keyboards)
- 1998: Dionne Sings Dionne Dionne Warwick (also composer and keyboards)
- 2002: For All Time Soluna (also guitar)
- 2006: I See Beautiful Tammy Trent (also guitar, keyboards, and duet on "Is This Love")
- 2008: Outloud! Spensha Baker (also composer, guitar, and keyboards)

==== Guest vocals ====
- 1998: "The First Noel" with Brian McKnight on Bethlehem
