= This I Know =

Studio album by Kim Boyce
- Released: 1990
- Studio: Knightlight Studios, Dallas, Texas
- Genre: CCM, R&B, Christian pop
- Length: 43:07
- Label: Myrrh, Word
- Producer: Tim Miner

Kim Boyce chronology
Love Is You to Me (1989)	This I Know (1990)	Facts of Love (1992)

Professional ratings
Review scores
Source	Rating
AllMusic	3/5 stars

This I Know is the fourth studio album by American Christian singer and songwriter Kim Boyce. It would be her final album on the Myrrh label released in 1990. Christian singer/songwriter Tim Miner, who co-wrote and produced the track "Tender Heart" from her 1989 album Love Is You to Me handles the production duties on this album. Boyce duets with her husband Gary Koreiba on the song "True Love" and also dedicates the album to him. Songwriting contributions provided by Miner, Cindy Cruse and Amy Grant. The album's first CHR/Pop single and music video "Good Enough" incorporates the traditional Gospel song "Old-Time Religion." This I Know peaked at number 15 on the Top Christian Albums chart.

== Track listing ==
No.	Title	Writer(s)	Length
1.	"Good Enough"	Tim Miner, Bernard Wright	3:40
2.	"No Means No"	David Ebensberger	4:23
3.	"Pain, Pain Go Away"	T. Miner	3:28
4.	"Time Marches On"	Kim Boyce	3:08
5.	"Take Me Home"	K. Boyce, T. Miner, Gary Koreiba, Cindy Cruse	4:03
6.	"Longing for Someone"	C. Cruse, Mark Stitts, Mike Stitts	4:51
7.	"Weapon of Good"	K. Boyce, T. Miner, C. Cruse	3:57
8.	"True Love" (duet with Gary Koreiba)	K. Boyce, Bo Cooper, Todd Cooper	4:00
9.	"Right for Me"	Amy Grant, Tom Hemby	3:32
10.	"All for You"	K. Boyce, T. Miner, G. Koreiba, C. Cruse	3:53
11.	"Good Enough to be Heard Again" (Reprise)	T. Miner, B. Wright	4:08

== Charts ==
Chart (1991)	Peak position
US Top Christian Albums (Billboard)	15

=== Radio singles ===
Year	Singles	Peak positions	
Year	Singles	CCM AC	CCM CHR
1990–91	"Pain, Pain Go Away"	9	—
1990–91	"Good Enough"	—	2
1991	"All For You"	16	—
1991	"Weapon of Good"	—	14
