= Tommy Sims =

American musician

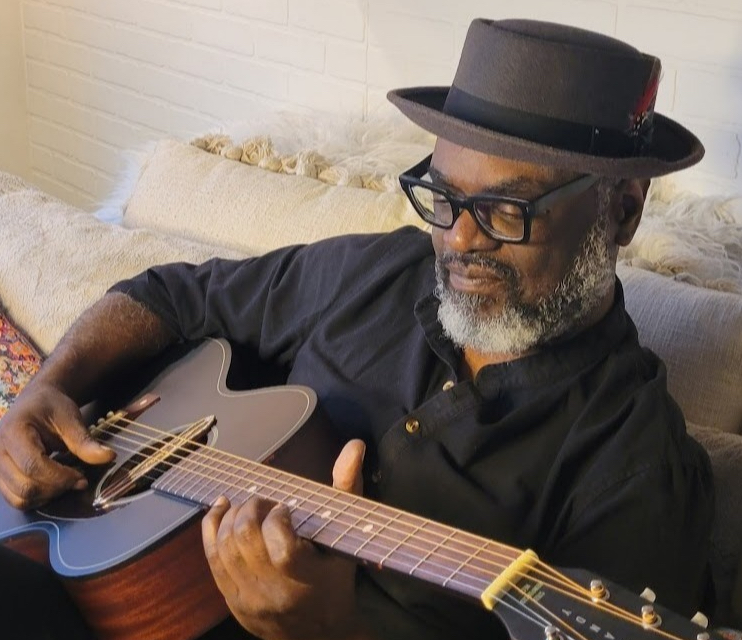
- Sims playing acoustic guitar, 2024

Background information
- Years active: 1987–present

Tommy Sims is an American bassist, songwriter, record producer and bandleader.

== Music career ==
From 1987 to 1989 Sims was the bassist for the Christian rock band White Heart, which he left to become a studio musician and producer. During 1992-1993, he played bass on the Bruce Springsteen 1992–1993 World Tour. As a songwriter he co-wrote "Make It Work" which was a hit for Vince Ebo on the Christian music chart in 1992. He played on Ebo's Love Is the Better Way album, including the song " (I Will Not Be) Shaken". He also co-wrote Eric Clapton's "Change the World", which won the Grammy Award for Song of the Year in 1997. Other songs of his have been recorded by Michael English, Bonnie Raitt, Susan Tedeschi, Garth Brooks, Cher, Blackstreet, Toni Braxton and BabyFace, among others. Sims has also worked with Michael Bolton, Amy Grant, Kelly Clarkson, Carman, CeCe Winans, Israel Houghton, Michael W. Smith, The Neville Brothers, Michelle Williams of Destiny's Child, Brian Courtney Wilson and others.

== Television and film contributions ==
In addition to writing and producing, Sims also released a solo album in August 2000, entitled Peace and Love. A song from this release, "It Don't Matter to the Sun", was featured on the soundtrack of the hit television drama Grey's Anatomy. Sims' film contributions include Bruce Springsteen's recording "Streets of Philadelphia", which appeared in the film Philadelphia, widely regarded as the first major film to deal openly with subject of AIDS and gay rights. The film and the song went on to be heavily recognized at the following year's Academy Awards, garnering several "Oscars", including the Best Song trophy. His song, Change The World", was also featured in the film Phenomenon. While winning a Grammy Award for Song of the Year, it was rendered ineligible for nomination at that year's Academy Awards, because of its prior release by Wynonna Judd. Sims had songs featured in several other blockbuster films, including For Love Of The Game and Where the Heart Is. He made a cameo appearance in Down Under the Big Top (1996), a short film by the Newsboys.

== Notable projects ==
- White Heart - Freedom
- Amy Grant – Heart in Motion, House of Love & Behind the Eyes
- Carman – "The Standard" (1993) & "R.I.O.T. (Righteous Invasion of Truth)" (1996)
- Bruce Springsteen – In Concert/MTV Plugged, "Streets Of Philadelphia"
- Garth Brooks – The Life of Chris Gaines & "Retrospective"
- Michael McDonald – Blue Obsession
- Kenny Loggins – It's About Time
- BlackStreet – Another Level
- Toni Braxton – The Heat
- Robert Randolph and the Family Band – "ColorBlind"
- Taylor Swift – Speak Now
- Rachael Lampa – Rachael Lampa
- Bonnie Raitt – "Silver Lining", "Souls Alike" & "I Can't Help You Now"
- Kelly Clarkson – Thankful
- Newsboys – Shine: The Hits
- Taylor Dayne – Naked Without You
- Natalie Grant – Deeper Life
- Michelle Williams – Do You Know
- Marvin Winans – Alone But Not Alone
- Darwin Hobbs – Worshipper, Broken & Vertical
- Israel and New Breed – Real & "The Power of One"
- Jonny Lang – Fight for My Soul
- Brian Courtney Wilson – "Just Love"
- CeCe Winans – Let Them Fall in Love & "You Will"

== Discography ==
- Peace and Love – released August 15, 2000 by Universal Motown Records, a division of UMG Recordings, Inc.
1. "Which Way (Intro)"
2. "100"
3. "New Jam"
4. "When You Go"
5. "Summer"
6. "Write One"
7. "Alone"
8. "The Way It Used to Be"
9. "Comin' Home"
10. "The Ballad of Sophie"
11. "It Don't Matter"
12. "Love's Patience"
13. "Peace and Love"
14. "Which Way"

== Grammy Awards ==
- Love God. Love People. The London Sessions – Best Pop / Contemporary Gospel Album (2010)
- Power of One – Best Pop / Contemporary Gospel Album (2009)
- "Change the World" – Song of the Year / New Song of the Year (1996)
