= Kim Boyce (album) =

Studio album by Kim Boyce
- Released: 1986
- Studio: The Bennett House (Franklin, Tennessee); The Master's Touch (Nashville, Tennessee); Rivendell Recorders (Houston, Texas); Dallas Sound Labs (Dallas, Texas); Ocean Way Recording and Bill Schnee Studios(Hollywood, California); Front Page Studio (Costa Mesa, California).
- Genre: CCM, dance pop
- Length: 35:06
- Label: Myrrh, Word
- Producer: Brian Tankersley

Kim Boyce chronology
Kim Boyce (1986)	Time and Again (1988)

Professional ratings
Review scores
Source	Rating
AllMusic	2.5/5 stars

Kim Boyce is the debut album by American Christian singer Kim Boyce, released in 1986 on Myrrh Records. The album debuted and peaked at number 29 on the Billboard Top Inspirational Albums chart.

== Critical reception ==
Evan Cater of AllMusic gave the album 2.5 out of 5 stars stating that: "The result is a wildly uneven sugar puff of utterly white-bread synthesized lite pop. A few of the tunes here are catchy enough to obscure the grating qualities of Boyce's frequently shrill vocals. The appealingly minor-key "Darkened Hearts," the effective formula ballad "Here," and—especially—the unexpected cover of Alison Moyet's "Love Resurrection" get the album off to a promising start, thanks in large part to the immaculate synthesized sheen of Brian Tankersley's production. But the rest of the album (with the exception of the silly but engaging "Sing and Dance") is almost unbearably flabby."

== Track listing ==
No.	Title	Writer(s)	Length
1.	"Love Resurrection"	Alison Moyet, Steve Jolley, Tony Swain	4:11
2.	"Darkened Hearts"	Kim Boyce, Tom Hemby	4;02
3.	"Here"	Tim Miner	4:48
4.	"That's How You Touched My Heart"	Dawn Rodgers, Monroe Jones	3:36
5.	"Love Knows"	K. Boyce, D. Rodgers, Rick Altizer	3:38
6.	"Sing and Dance"	K. Boyce, Rhett Lawrence	3:19
7.	"You Are The One"	M. Jones, George Cocchini, Chris McCollum	3:18
8.	"I Want His Heart"	K. Boyce, James Hollihan, Jr.	3:37
9.	"How Will They Remember?"	Kim Boyce, Tom Hemby	4:40

== Personnel ==
- Kim Boyce – vocals, backing vocals (1, 2, 8)
- James Hollihan – keyboards (1, 4, 8), drum programming (1, 4, 8), arrangements (1, 4, 8), guitars (4, 8)
- Tom Hemby – keyboards (2, 9), guitars (2, 9), drum programming (2, 9), arrangements (2, 9)
- John Andrew Schreiner – keyboards (3, 5), drum programming (3), arrangements (3)
- Paul Mills – additional keyboards (3), keyboards (7)
- Rick Altizer – keyboards (5), drum programming (5), arrangements (5)
- Rhett Lawrence – keyboards (6), drum programming (6), arrangements (6)
- Stewart – guitars (5)
- George Cocchini – guitars (7), drum programming (7)
- John Patitucci – bass (5)
- Bruce Atkinson – fretless bass (9)
- Kirk Whalum – saxophone (1, 4), soprano saxophone (3)
- David Schober – arrangements (5)
- Rick Crawford – backing vocals (1, 3)
- Brian Tankersley – backing vocals (1), drum programming (3), additional drums (7)
- Wayne Watson – backing vocals (1, 3)
- Tim Miner – backing vocals (6)

Production

- Brian Tankersley – producer (1–4, 6–9), engineer (1–4, 6–9), mixing
- Rick Altizer – producer (5)
- David Schober – producer (5), recording (5)
- Rhett Lawrence – co-producer (6)
- Lynn Nichols – mixing
- J.T. Cantwelll – second engineer
- Tim Kimsey – second engineer
- Ron Lagerlof – second engineer
- Mike Ross – second engineer
- Clark Schleicher – second engineer
- Joan Tankersley – art direction, design
- Moshe Brakha – photography
- Lori Cooper – graphics
- Lynette Leggott – graphics
- Wendy Rosen – hair, make-up
- Michael Dixon – management

== Charts ==
Chart (1987)	Peak position
US Top Inspirational Albums (Billboard)	29

=== Radio singles ===
Year	Singles	Peak positions	
Year	Singles	CCM AC	CCM CHR
1986	"Darkened Hearts"	13	3
1987	"Here"	1	7
1987	"Love Resurrection"	—	12
1987	"That's How You Touched My Heart"	38	5
1987	"How Will They Remember?"	26	—
