= Tender Heart (Kim Boyce song) =

Single by Kim Boyce

from the album Love Is You to Me
- Released: 1989
- Label: Myrrh 7016886387
- Composers: K. Boyce, T. Miner
- Producer: Tim Miner

"Tender Heart" is a 1989 single by Christian singer Kim Boyce. It was a hit on the Contemporary Christian music chart the following year.

== Background ==
"Tender Heart" was written by Kim Boyce and Tim Miner. The song is included on Boyce's 1989 Love Is You to Me album that was released on the Myrrh label. The album version of the song is 5:03 long.

== Reception ==
In a review of Boyce's album in the 7 April 1990 issue of Cash Box, a big thumbs up was given to "Tender Heart", and "Love Is You to Me" for what was described as their commanding lyrics and striking delivery.

== Charts ==
"Tender Heart" made its debut on the CCM chart for the week of 26 February 1990. It peaked at No. 6 for the week of 16 April. It spent a total of fourteen weeks on the chart.

"Tender Heart" debuted at No. 36 on the Cash Box Contemporary Christian Top 40 Singles chart for the week of 24 March 1990. At week six, the single peaked at No. 24 for the week of 28 April. The single's last chart entry was at 40 for week ten for the week of 26 May.
