= Angelo & Veronica =

US musical group

- Origin: Boston, Massachusetts
- Genres: CCM; Christian R&B; gospel; urban contemporary gospel; contemporary R&B; brown-eyed soul
- Years active: 1992–present
- Labels: Benson; Harmony; A&V Music
- Members: Angelo Petrucci; Veronica Petrucci
- Website: angeloandveronica.com

Angelo & Veronica Petrucci are an American urban contemporary gospel music husband and wife duo who began their recording careers in 1992, originated from Boston, Massachusetts. Until 2024, the duo released ten albums; two of those albums charted on the US Billboard Christian Albums chart. They also earned three GMA Dove Awards for their work.

== Background ==
The duo has its origins in Boston, Massachusetts. Angelo Petrucci Jr., who is of Italian ancestry, was born into a musical family. Petrucci's father played guitar professionally and his mother was a pianist. When Petrucci's father became ill and could no longer perform, at the age of 13 Petrucci began performing professionally. When Petrucci's parents became Christians, they slowly influenced him with Commissioned's "Running Back to You". Petrucci, while attending the Berklee College of Music, began performing secular music and he continued performing as a secular music artist for ten years. Veronica Beth Torres, who hails from the New York City borough The Bronx, also attended the Berklee College of Music. Torres had a chance encounter with Petrucci at one of his music performances. Their attraction was instant and they eventually formed a close bond, both personally and professionally. The two soon began performing professionally as secular music artists. When they both became Christians, they decided to pursue careers as gospel music recording artists. Eventually the two married and began performing as a gospel music duo.

== History ==
In 1992, Angelo & Veronica got their first record deal with Benson Records and released their debut studio album, Higher Place that year, with songs including "I Love You More" and the album's title track. "I Love You More" was produced by Scott MacLeod and Trace Scarborough. The song would be performed at the 1993 Dove Awards, and was featured on CBS TV's As The World Turns. With distribution from A&M Records, the album became the duo's breakthrough release, debuting at No. 35 on the US Billboard Top Contemporary Christian Albums chart, spending three weeks there. This was followed by their second album Angelo & Veronica, released in November 1993, which included the songs "God Knows" (which won a GMA Dove Award for Contemporary Gospel Recorded Song of the Year in 1995) and "You Loved Me When" (which was accompanied by a music video). During that time, the duo performed onstage with various contemporary Christian artists and groups, and made appearances on several Christian music awards, including the 25th GMA Dove Awards, where the duo performed alongside Michael English and First Call, "Let's Build a Bridge", a song originally from English's debut album (1991).

Give Your Life, the duo's third effort, was released in May 1995; it became another success, as it charted at number 39 on the Billboard Christian Albums chart and won a GMA Dove Award for Urban Album of the Year in 1996. Their fourth album and first Spanish effort, Da Tu Vida, a Spanish edition of Give Your Life, was released in September of that year, and included a Spanish version of their hit "God Knows", titled "Él Sabe Bien". In November 1996, their fifth studio album Not Enough was released, and became their final album with Benson Records, before moving to Harmony Records three years later for their sixth studio album Change in 1999. During that period, Angelo collaborated on the album Sing Me to Sleep Daddy, which won a GMA Dove Award for Children's Music Album of the Year in 1998.

The duo, continued performing regularly onstage through the 2000s; during that time, Veronica launched her solo career in 2007, with her debut album A Voice for Women; followed by Atrévete a Soñar in 2009, and Made It Out Alive in 2013, the latter having collaborations with Fred Hammond, John P. Kee, Shirley Murdock, Brian Courtney Wilson and the Mississippi Mass Choir.

The duo's first album in ten years, Still in Love, was released independently in 2009, and all of their following albums were released through their own label, A&V Music, including The Truth (2017) and Back to the Gospel (2021).

Since 2018, Angelo and Veronica started their own church, the Higher Place Church.

== Members ==
- Angelo Petrucci Jr. (born 1959)
- Veronica Beth Petrucci (née Torres) (born 1969)

== Discography ==
=== Studio albums ===
==== As Angelo & Veronica ====
Title	Album details	Peak positions
Title	Album details	US CHR
Higher Place	Released: August 18, 1992; Label: Benson	35
Angelo & Veronica	Released: November 3, 1993; Label: Benson	–
Give Your Life	Released: May 25, 1995; Label: Benson	39
Da Tu Vida	Released: September 15, 1995; Label: Benson	–
Not Enough	Released: November 19, 1996; Label: Benson	–
Change	Released: September 21, 1999; Label: Harmony	–
Still In Love	Released: April 21, 2009; Label: A&V Music	–
The Truth	Released: November 23, 2017; Label: A&V Music	–
Back to the Gospel	Released: July 30, 2021; Label: A&V Music	–
The Original Recordings 1990-1991	Released: April 25, 2022; Label: A&V Music	–

==== Veronica Petrucci solo albums ====
Title	Album details
A Voice for Women	Released: 2007; Label: A&V Music
Atrévete a Soñar	Released: September 22, 2009; Label: A&V Music
Made It Out Alive	Released: November 19, 2013; Label: A&V Music
