= In Harm's Way (BeBe Winans song) =

Song by BeBe Winans

from the album BeBe Winans
- Released: 1997
- Label: Atlantic 2-84035
- Composers: BeBe Winans, Rhett Lawrence and Margaret Bell-Byars
- Producer: Rhett Lawrence

"In Harm's Way" is a 1997 single by BeBe Winans. It registered on multiple charts that year.

== Background ==
The song was written by Margaret Bell-Byars. It was recorded by BeBe Winans and was released on Atlantic 2-84035 in 1997.

At one stage, BeBe Winans' manager Jill Siegel suggested that the video for "In Harm's Way" be directed by Denzel Washington. Washington ended up directing the video.

== Reception ==
The single was reviewed in the 20 September issue of Billboard. It was positive with the reviewer writing that BeBe Winans delivered a smooth and soulful slow jam with an infusion of a warmth and honesty. The potential to interest both mature and youthful listeners was also mentioned.

== Airplay ==
=== Video ===
For the week of 26 October 1997, "In Harm's Way" was an Add On at VH1 Music First.

== Charts ==
=== Billboard ===
For the week of 1 November 1997, the single debuted at No. 39 on the Billboard Hot R&B Singles chart. It also debuted at No. 25 on the Bubbling Under the Hot 100 chart.

The song eventually peaked at No. 83 on the Hot 100.

=== Hits ===
For the week of 21 November, the single debuted at No. 50 on the Hits Sizzling Singles Top 50 chart, and No. 25 on the Hits Urban Adult Top 25 chart.
