= Love Is the Better Way =

1992 album by Vince Ebo

Studio album by Vince Ebo
- Released: 1992
- Length: 49:24
- Label: Warner Bros. Records 9 26895-2, Warner Alliance WBC-4115
- Producers: Scott MacLeod, Trace Scarborough

Love Is the Better Way is a 1992 album by singer Vince Ebo. Three songs from the album were hits on the Christian chart.

== Background ==
The album was released on CD in the United States on Warner Alliance WBD-4115 and Warner Alliance 26895 in 1992. It was also released on compact cassette, Warner Alliance WBC-4115.

== Reception ==
The album was reviewed in the 16 May 1992 issue of Cash Box. The reviewer wrote that the smooth ballads and funk filled jams on the album were brought to life through Ebo's enormous vocal talents and it would be one of the success stories for 1992.

The songs, "Love Is the Better Way", "It's Over", "Real Love" and "Love" were recommended as adds for the urban and quiet storm formats. The album was also at No. 3 on the Cash Box Gospel Music New Releases list for that week.

The album received a 6/10 rating from Cross Rhythms. The reviewer wrote that the arrangements big budget classiness were a bit soul-by-numbers and the effect was dissipated. The reviewer did write that his voice with its "soar and sweep" was awesome and spine tingling.

The album is at No. 393 in the "CCM's 500 Best Albums of All Time" list.

The album has a 4½ star rating by AllMusic.

== Singles ==
"Make it Work" debuted the Christian chart for the week of 20 April 1992. It peaked at No. 3 during its eleven-week run. The video for the song was a "Video Pick of the Week" in the 13 June issue of Cash Box. "Forgiven" debuted on the Christian chart for the week of 3 August 1992. Spending ten weeks on the chart, it peaked at No. 4 for the week of 14 September. "(I Will Not Be) Shaken" made it to No. 14 on 1 November 1993 during its nine-week run on the Christian chart.

== Tracks ==
1. "Forgiven" - 4:09
2. "Love Is the Better Way - 5:18
3. "Make It Work" (Vincenzo's Groove) - 5:41
4. "(I Will Not Be) Shaken" - 4:53
5. "These Are the Questions" - 5:48
6. "Why" - 4:24
7. "It's Over" - 6:24
8. "Real Love" - 4:23
9. "Long Time Comin'" - 4:00
10. "Love" - 4:29

== Personnel ==
- Kevin Bond - producer, arranger, songwriter, keyboards, programming
- Bob Carlisle - background vocals
- Bill Deaton - mixing
- Pasquale Del Vellaggio - assistant engineer
- Mike E - guitar
- Vince Ebo - producer, arranger, songwriter, vocals
- Kim Fleming - background Vocals
- Vicki Hampton - background Vocals
- Craig Hansen engineer, mixing
- Dann Huff - guitar
- David Huntsinger - piano
- JB Baird - engineer, background vocals
- Neal Joseph - executive producer
- Mike Lawler - keyboard programming, hammond B-3
- Bryan Lenox - engineer
- Graham Lewis - assistant Engineer
- Jeremy Lubbock - arrangement (strings)
- Scott MacLeod - producer, Arranger, Songwriter, synthesizer bass, drums, percussion
- Carl Marsh - strings
- Paul Mills - engineer
- Jeffrey Mingle - computer whiz
- Marty Paoletta - saxophone
- Charlie Peacock - producer, arranger, songwriter, keyboard programming
- Jet Penix - producer, arranger, Songwriter, Keyboard Programming
- Garrett Rockey - assistant engineer
- Chris Rodriguez- background vocals
- Matt Rollings - keyboards
- Trace Scarborough - producer, arranger, songwriter, piano, keyboards, synthesizers, synthesizer bass
- Tommy Sims - producer, arranger, songwriter, keyboard programming, bass, guitars, background vocals
- Jimmie Lee Sloas - bass
- Craig White - assistant engineer
- Bill Whittington - mixing

Victor Wooten - bass
