= Scott MacLeod (musician) =

Canadian musician

- Born: Scott David MacLeod; Canada
- Occupations: Musician, music producer, pastor
- Spouse: Sarah MacLeod
- Children: Emily and Daniel

Scott MacLeod is a musician and song writer. Artists he has written or co-written hits for include Kim Boyce, Vince Ebo and Margaret Bell. He is also a pastor.

== Background ==
MacLeod was the 1995 American Songwriter Christian Writer of the Year and writer of the Top Christian Song of 1995, "By Faith". He has worked multiple times with Trace Scarborough.

At one stage, MacLeod was a member of David Mullen's backing band One Blood.

In later years, MacLeod would become a pastor.

== Career ==
MacLeod, Marty McCall and Trace Scarborough composed the music for the song "Poverty" which was recorded by First Call and included on their God Is Good album which was released in 1989.

As a member of One Blood, the backing band for David Mullen, he played on his Revival album that was released in 1989. The album was reviewed by Cole Moreton for CR Magazine. Moreton called it an absolute gem. One blood were called immaculate as was the "wild drummer" MacLeod.

Macleod, Trace Scarborough and Donna McElroy composed the song "Undoused Fire". It was released as a single on the Warner Bros. Gospel label in 1990. The song spent four weeks on the Radio WJTL chart, peaking at No. 32 for the week of 4 February 1991.

MacLeod played drums and added percussion to four songs on Margaret Bell's 1991 Over and Over album. He also composed one song, "What You Do" with Chris Rodriguez and Trace Scarborough. The song debuted on the CCM chart for the week of 10 February 1992. Spending fourteen weeks on the chart, it peaked at No. 9 on the week of 13 April.

MacLeod and Trace Scarborough wrote "Forgiven for Vince Ebo. The song debuted on the CCM Christian chart for the week of 3 August 1992. Spending ten weeks on the chart, it peaked at No. 4 for the week of 14 September. They also produced Ebo's Love Is the Better Way album that was released that year. He also various roles on Michael W. Smith's Change Your World album, ranging from production to drum programming and playing the synthesizer on "Out of This World".

MacLeod and Trace Scarborough composed the song "I Love You More" which was recorded by Angelo & Veronica. The song was performed at the 1993 Dove Awards, and was featured on CBS TV's As The World Turns.

MacLeod and Trace Scarborough produced Michael Sandifer's self-titled album that was released on Acorn Music, Inc. in 1995. The album was reviewed in the May 1995 issue of Religious Broadcasting by Darlene Peterson. It was described as having a "a rich, yet relaxing a/c backdrop".

MacLeod, Trace Scarborough and Vince Ebo wrote "(I Will Not Be) Shaken" which was recorded by Ebo. Spending nine weeks on the CCM chart, it peaked at No. 14 on 1 November 1993.

Chris Rice and MacLeod composed song "By Faith" for Kim Boyce. It was released on Warner Alliance. It was a hit on the CCM chart, peaking at No. 3 for the week of 2 January 1995.

MacLeod and Ross Huskinson wrote the song "To Really Love" for Anthony Skinner. The song was entered in the 2007 International Songwriting Competition. MacLeod and Huskinson are awarded First Place in the Gospel / Christian category.

== Ministry ==
In Later years MacLeod and his wife have been co-pastors of the Harvest Sound a church based in the heart of Nashville, Tennessee.
