= Just Love (Brian Courtney Wilson album) =

Studio album by Brian Courtney Wilson
- Released: June 2, 2009
- Recorded: 2009
- Genre: Urban, gospel
- Length: 44:47
- Label: Music World
- Producer: Stan Jones

Alternate cover
- Deluxe edition cover

Just Love is the debut album by singer Brian Courtney Wilson. The album was released on June 2, 2009 in the United States. The title song received a Dove Award nomination at the 41st GMA Dove Awards. A deluxe edition of the album was released on October 5, 2010, accompanied by a nationwide tour.

== Recording ==
Wilson was signed to Music World, after Mathew Knowles heard Wilson's song "Already Here". Stan Jones was selected to produce and the album was recorded in Jackson, Mississippi.

== Track listing ==
No.	Title	Producer/writer(s)	Length
1.	"Just Love"	Spears, Williams, Wilson	4:19
2.	"All I Need"	Jones	4:57
3.	"No Other"	Jones, Wilson	4:00
4.	"Simply Redeemed"	Harris, Tommy Simms	4:32
5.	"Already Here"	Wilson	5:35
6.	"I Need More"	Jones	3:23
7.	"Almighty God"	Byrd	5:30
8.	"Believe"	Lewis, Wilson	5:48
9.	"Waiting To Turn"	Wilson	4:53
10.	"Monday's Pain"	Lewis, Wilson	1:50

== Chart performance ==
Just Love debuted at No. 2 on the Billboard's Top Gospel Album chart and No. 6 on Billboard's Top Christian Album chart. The CD has remained at No. 1 on Christian Music Trade Association's (CMTA) Inspirational Album chart for nearly 50 weeks. Since its release in June 2009, the CD has held steady in the Top 15 on the Billboard Top Gospel Album chart for over 83 weeks.

Also, the song "Just Love" peaked at No. 14 on Billboard's Gospel Songs and has spent 19 weeks on the chart. The song "All I Need" peaked at No. 6 and has spent 83 weeks on the chart. The song "Already Here" also peaked at No. 13.

== Awards ==
In 2010, the song "Just Love" was nominated to a Dove Award for Urban Recorded Song of the Year, at the 41st GMA Dove Awards.
