= Make It Work (Vince Ebo song) =

Song by Vince Ebo

from the album Love Is the Better Way
- A-side: 1. "Love" (Album Version (AC Radio)); 2. "Make It Work" (Vincenzo‘a Groove (Radio Edit)) (CHR Radio); 3. "Make It Work" (Vincenzo‘a Groove (Album Version)) (CHR Radio)
- Released: 1992
- Length: 5:41
- Label: Warner Alliance
- Composers: Vince Ebo, Tommy Sims
- Producer: Vince Ebo

Vince Ebo singles chronology
"Make It Work" (1992)	"Forgiven" (1992)

"Make It Work" is a 1992 single by Vince Ebo. It made the charts that year and had over a year off and on the Lightmusic video play list.

== Background ==
"Make It Work" was written by Vince Ebo and Tommy Sims. It was released in 1992. It is from Ebo's Love Is the Better Way album that was released in 1992.

== Reception ==
The video for the song was a "Video Pick of the Week" in the 13 June 1992 issue of Cash Box.

In 1993, "Make It Work" was to become the new slogan and soundtrack in an infomercial for Project Impact, a juvenile court diversion program for at risk youth.

The video was nominated for a Dove Award in the Short Form Music Video category.

== Chart ==
"Make It Work" debuted on the CCM contemporary hits chart for the week of 20 April 1992. It peaked at No. 3 during an eleven-week run.

== Video play ==
=== Audio Vision ===
"Make It Work" debuted on the Audio Vision Current list for the week of 8 August 1992. The song reappeared on the Audio Vision Current list for the week of 24 October.

=== Lightmusic ===
With the song incorrectly titled "Make It Happen", it was on the Lightmusic Current list for the week of 31 October 1992.

"Make It Work" debuted on the Lightmusic Current list as of 16 January 1993. It was back on the Lightmusic Current list as of 6 February. The song was back on the list for the week of 27 February. It reappeared as of 3 April on the Lightmusic list.

It was back on the Lightmusic list for the week of 29 May. It appeared again on the Lightmusic list for the week of 25 September 1993.

According to the 31 January 1994 issue of the CMJ New Music Report and 5 February issue of Billboard, the video was still appearing on the Lightmusic channel. Its last appearance may have been for the week of 19 February.
