= Margaret Bell-Byars =

- Born: Margaret Bell; July 29, 1962 (age 64); Detroit, Michigan
- Genres: Gospel, Christian R&B, CCM, traditional black gospel
- Occupations: Singer, songwriter
- Instruments: vocals, singer-songwriter
- Years active: 1970–present
- Label: Warner Alliance

Margaret Bell-Byars (born July 29, 1962) is an American gospel musician, who is a traditional black gospel and Christian R&B recording artist. She started her music career, in 1980, when enrolled at Oral Roberts University, signing in their choir. Her only studio album, Over and Over, was released in 1991, with Warner Alliance Music. This album was her breakthrough release upon the Billboard magazine charts.

== Early life ==
Bell-Byars was born on July 29, 1962, in Detroit, Michigan, to Jesse Garfield and Mildred Bell, where her father was the pastor of Mount Everett Church of God in Christ, while she was raised with two older sisters, Charlene and Vanessa. She graduated with her baccalaureate degree in broadcasting from Oral Roberts University.

== Music career ==
Her music recording career was brief, where she only released, one studio album, Over and Over, with Warner Alliance Music, in 1991. This album was her breakthrough release upon the Billboard magazine Gospel Albums chart, where it peaked at No. 23.

"Any Day Any Minute Now" was written by Robert Sterling and Joe Hogue. It debuted on the CCM chart for the week of 23 September 1991. Spending twelve weeks on the chart, it peaked at No. 12 for the week of 11 November.

"What You Do" was written by Trace Scarborough, Scott MacLeod and Chris Rodriguez. It debuted on the CCM chart for the week of 10 February 1992. Spending fourteen weeks on the chart, it peaked at No. 9 on the week of 13 April.

Her song "Crazy When It Comes to You" was at No. 3 on the Bobby Jones Top 5 Videos chart for the week of 27 June 1992.

Bell-Byars wrote the song "In Harm's Way" which was recorded by BeBe Winans and released in 1997. For the week of 1 November, it debuted at No. 39 on the Billboard Hot R&B Singles chart. It also debuted at No. 25 on the Bubbling Under the Hot 100 chart. The song eventually peaked at No. 83 on the Hot 100.

== Personal life ==
She is married to former professional football player, Keith Byars.

== Discography ==
=== Studio albums ===
List of studio albums, with selected chart positions
Title	Album details	Peak chart positions
Title	Album details	US Gos
Over and Over	Released: 1991; Label: Warner Alliance Music; CD, digital download	23
