= WJTL =

- Lancaster, Pennsylvania; United States
- Frequency: 90.3 MHz

Programming
- Language: English
- Format: Christian adult contemporary

Ownership
- Owner: Creative Ministries, Inc.

History
- First air date: 1984
- Call sign meaning: Jesus the Lord

Technical information
- Licensing authority: FCC
- Facility ID: 14467
- Class: B1
- ERP: 12,000 watts
- HAAT: 141.0 meters (462.6 ft)
- Transmitter coordinates: 40°3′31.00″N 76°27′40.00″W

Links
- Public license information: Public file; LMS
- Webcast: Listen Live
- Website: wjtl.com

WJTL (90.3 FM) is a non-commercial radio station broadcasting a Christian adult contemporary format. Licensed in Lancaster, Pennsylvania, United States, the station serves the Lancaster, Harrisburg, York, and Lebanon markets. The station is currently owned by Creative Ministries, Inc. Their current program director and station managers are John Shirk and Fred McNaughton. The station started on August 28, 1984, and switched to a 24-hour stereo format in 1985. WJTL was Lancaster's first Christian Contemporary station. WJTL's transmitter is located on Prospect Road in Ironville, Pennsylvania.

Previous logo
