= Brian Courtney Wilson =

American singer

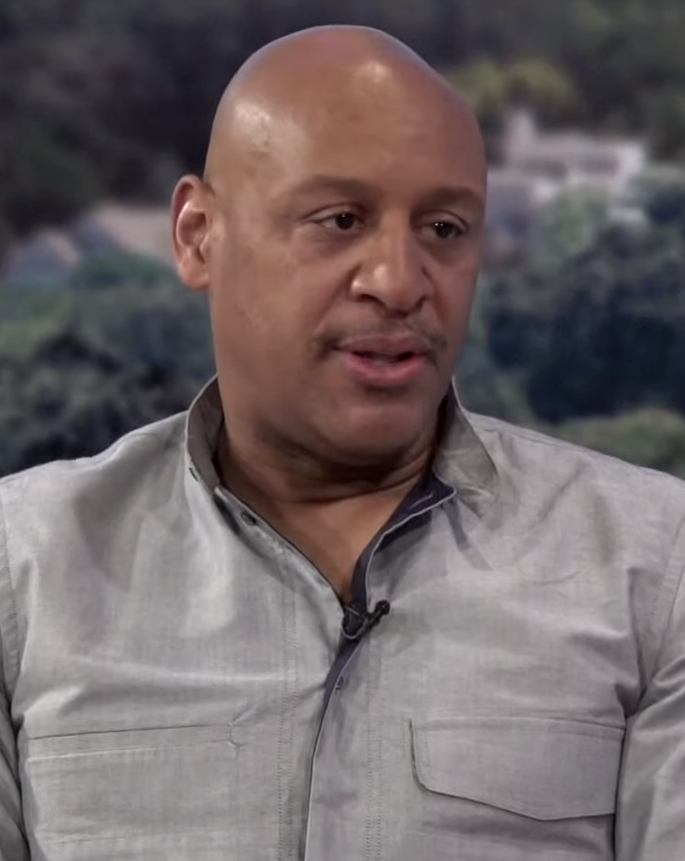
- Wilson in 2018

Background information
- Born: Brian Courtney Wilson; November 1, 1971 (age 54)
- Origin: Chicago, Illinois
- Genres: Gospel, Urban Music, Contemporary Christian music
- Occupations: Recording Artist, Singer, Songwriter
- Instrument: Vocals
- Label: EMI Gospel/Motown Gospel

Brian Courtney Wilson is an American gospel and contemporary Christian music singer.

== Biography ==
Wilson was raised in the Chicago area. In his childhood, Wilson began singing with the adult male chorus with his father at the Rock of Ages Baptist Church in Maywood, Illinois.

Wilson enrolled at the University of Illinois, where he also sang in the University of Illinois Black Chorus. He eventually graduated with a degree in liberal arts and sciences, with an emphasis on economics. Wilson took a job as a pharmaceutical salesman, while he continued to sing in his free time.

After seven years, Wilson moved to Houston, Texas, to work for Johnson & Johnson. He started visiting Windsor Village United Methodist Church with a friend and became a born-again Christian. After some time, Wilson was invited to write music for their services, with some of his songs receiving airplay on local radio stations.

At some point, Wilson met Pastor Rudy Rasmus, who was looking for songs to pitch to friend and music entrepreneur Mathew Knowles. After listening to Wilson's song "Already Here", Knowles signed Wilson to his record label Spirit Rising/Music World.

In 2009, Wilson released his debut album titled Just Love. The album was produced by Stan Jones and features contributions by Tommy Simms. In 2010, the title song was nominated for a Dove Award for Urban Recorded Song of the Year, while Wilson himself was nominated for New Artist of the Year at the 41st GMA Dove Awards.Wilson's single "All I Need" also set a record for staying on the Top Gospel Songs chart for 89 weeks. Wilson re-released a deluxe edition of his album on October 5 of the same year, accompanied by a nationwide tour through several cities in the United States.

In 2012, Wilson undertook two projects simultaneously. First, he released the album "So Proud". According to amazon.com, Wilson recalls that "The inspiration for this project came three years ago when I penned "So Proud," the title song and the CD project's first single. The song is about remembering ... remembering the reasons why you should keep going when the days seem the hardest...remembering your value when people cast you aside...remembering the people who did not give up on you when you feel like giving up on yourself...and most of all, it's about remembering that the reason we have so much to remember is because God has always been there to make a way through the people in our lives." The album debuted at No. 1 on the Top Gospel Albums charts, and the singles "So Proud" and "He Still Cares" made their way to radio.

It was also in 2012 that he united with Gospel legend Fred Hammond, Dave Hollister and R&B artist Eric Roberson to make the United Tenors project, which was released in 2013. Cited as the last addition to the group, it was clear once the production began ... that Wilson quickly left his fingerprints on the project. In 2015, Wilson signed with Motown Gospel. He later came out with the single "Worth Fighting For". This single became known worldwide. The single peaked at No. 3 on Top Gospel Songs chart. The song was nominated for Urban Recorded Song of the year at the 46th GMA Dove Awards, and he is also nominated for a Grammy for Song of the Year. Wilson also won Traditional Gospel Album of the Year for his album Worth Fighting For. This album debuted at No. 2 on the Top Gospel Albums chart.

In 2018 Brian Courtney Wilson released his hit single "A Great Work". This marked his fastest rising single to date, and reached number 1 on the Billboard Gospel Charts as well being nominated for multiple Grammy and Dove Awards for both the song and the album "A Great Work".

== Acting ==
Wilson made his acting debut starring in the play I'm Only Human.

== Personal life ==
Wilson has two children.

== Discography ==
=== Albums ===
Year	Album details	Peak			Certifications (sales threshold)
Year	Album details	Gospel	Christian	CMTA	Certifications (sales threshold)
2009	Just Love: Released: June 2, 2009; Label: Music World; Format: CD	2	6	1	
2012	So Proud: Released: February 25, 2012; Label: Music World; Format: CD	1	5	1	
2015	Worth Fighting For: Released: January 24, 2015; Label: EMI Gospel/Motown Gospel; Format: CD	2	2	2	
2018	A Great Work: Released: March 23, 2018; Label: Motown Gospel (EGS); Format: CD	3	3	3	
"—" denotes releases that did not chart

== Awards and nominations ==
Year	Presenter	Award	Result
2010	GMA Dove Awards	New Artist of the Year	Nominated
2010	GMA Dove Awards	Urban Recorded Song of the Year	Nominated
2011	GMA Dove Awards	Urban Recorded Song of the Year	Nominated
2011	NAACP Image Awards	Outstanding Gospel Album	Nominated
2013	Stellar Awards	Contemporary Group of the Year	Won
2013	Stellar Awards	Group/Duo of the Year	Won
2015	GMA Dove Awards	Traditional Gospel Album of the Year	Won
2015	GMA Dove Awards	Contemporary Song of the Year	Nominated
2016	Grammy Awards	Gospel Performance Song of the Year	Nominated
2016	Billboard Music Awards	Top Gospel Song	Nominated
2018	GMA Dove Awards	Contemporary Gospel/Urban Recorded Song of the Year	Nominated
2018	GMA Dove Awards	Contemporary Gospel/Urban Album of the Year	Nominated
2019	Grammy Awards	Best Gospel Performance/Song	Nominated
2019	Grammy Awards	Best Gospel Album	Nominated
2019	Stellar Awards	Song of the Year	Won
2019	Stellar Awards	Artist of the Year	Nominated
2019	Stellar Awards	Male Vocalist of the Year	Nominated
2019	Stellar Awards	Contemporary Male Vocalist of the Year	Nominated
