= Chris Rodriguez (singer) =

American guitarist & singer (born 1960)

- Born: Christopher William Rodriguez; 7 March 1960 (age 66)
- Occupation: Musician
- Formerly of: The Players, Music City Unites for Haiti, Generation Radio

Chris Rodriguez (born March 7, 1960) is an American guitarist, who became known for performing contemporary Christian music and then played for various secular artists. He is a singer and songwriter.

== Background ==
Rodriguez was born in The Bronx on March 7, 1960 and moved to Nashville, becoming a successful artist in the early 1990s. He sang jingles for fast food companies and worked as a backup singer and guitarist in Christian music, country music, and pop recording with Michael Bolton, Steven Curtis Chapman, Vince Gill, Amy Grant, Faith Hill, Billy Joel, Wynonna Judd, Kenny Loggins, Michael McDonald, Rich Mullins, Dolly Parton, Michael W. Smith, Shania Twain, and Jaci Velasquez. He worked as a songwriter with credits including "Help You Find Your Way" by Michael W. Smith.

His debut album, Beggar's Paradise, was released by Word Records in 1999 and was produced by Brent Bourgeois. The album was described as "somewhere between pop-ified country and layered folk" by the Richmond Times-Dispatch and "a '60s/'70s pop primer worth studying" by the Dayton Daily News. CCM lauded Rodriguez's "commitment not to paint by the numbers" in his songwriting. He continues to be a session musician with Kenny Rogers, Kenny Loggins, Lee Ann Womack, and other artists. Rodriguez leads Nashville-based band The Alternators, which features Nashville session players that interchange as their schedules allow. He is a member of the supergroup “Generation Radio”, with Jason Scheff, of Chicago, and Jay DeMarcus, of Rascal Flatts.

Rodriguez has been divorced three times and has two children from his first marriage, Andre and Nic.

== Career ==
Rodriguez, Trace Scarborough and Scott MacLeod composed "What You Do" for Margaret Bell. The song debuted on the CCM chart for the week of 10 February 1992. Spending fourteen weeks on the chart, it peaked at No. 9 on the week of 13 April.

Rodriguez was part of Shania Twain's "The Woman in Me" TV tour band 1995-96 performing selected international venues and television shows with musicians Randy Thomas (co-writer of the song "Butterfly Kisses"), Dan Schafer, Russ Taff, Dave Malachowski, Marc Muller, Allison Cornell, and Will Owsley. From 2005 to 2010, Rodriguez toured with Keith Urban and in 2010-11 he was on the road with LeAnn Rimes. He toured with Kenny Loggins from 2007–2010. In 2011, Rodriguez was working with Don Moen and new artist Jessica Ridley. In 2012, Rodriguez played rhythm guitar for Faith Hill and Kelly Clarkson on tour. He performed backing vocals on several Megadeth albums including The System Has Failed (2004), United Abominations (2007), Endgame (2009), Thirteen (2011), and Dystopia (2016).

Beginning in 2015, Rodriguez has toured with Peter Cetera. He performed some duets with Cetera like "Hard Habit to Break".

== Discography ==
=== Solo ===
- Beggar's Paradise (1999)
- Paraíso de un Mendigo (1999) [10-track Spanish version of the 12-track Beggar's Paradise]
- Head, Hands and Heart: Songs from the Venus Pool - Volume One (2019)
- All The Best of Everything (2021)
