= Kim Boyce =

American contemporary Christian music singer

- Born: March 14, 1961 (age 65); Winter Haven, Florida
- Beauty pageant titleholder
- Title: Miss Florida 1983
- Major competition: Miss America 1984
- Website: http://ohhappydaygospel.com/

Kim Boyce Koreiba (born March 14, 1961) is an American contemporary Christian music singer. She is best known for her 1990s album By Faith. She was born in Winter Haven, Florida. She was Miss Manatee and Miss Florida 1983 and competed at Miss America 1984.

== Career ==
Boyce's singles include "Good Enough" (No. 2 in 1991), "Weapon of Good" (No. 14 in 1991), "When Love Calls Your Name" (No. 12 in 1992). The song "When Love Calls Your Name", a 1992 single for Boyce, was written by Tom Snow and Jimmy Scott and originally recorded in 1991 by Cher on the album Love Hurts.

Boyce had the Chris Rice, Scott MacLeod composed song "By Faith" released on Warner Alliance. It was a hit on the CCM chart, peaking at No. 3 for the week of 2 January 1995.

== Later years ==
Boyce now resides in the Branson, Missouri, area with her husband, Gary Koreiba. They were both performers at Branson's Pierce Arrow Theater for many years. As of 2022 they currently are featured performers in the "Oh Happy Day!" gospel music show performing Sundays at the Hamners' Variety Theater.

They have two sons, including Indy NXT driver and 2024 IMSA Pro-Am class champion Alexander Koreiba.

== Discography ==
- 1986: Kim Boyce (Myrrh Records)
- 1988: Time and Again
- 1989: Love Is You to Me
- 1990: This I Know
- 1992: Facts of Love (Warner Alliance), including the single "When Love Calls Your Name"
- 1995: Por Fe (En Español)
- 1994: By Faith
- 1997: As I Am (Diadem)
- 2007: The Definitive Collection (Word/Curb)
